= List of anime based on video games =

This is a list of anime based on video games. It includes anime that are adaptations of video games or whose characters originated in video games. Many anime (Japanese animated productions usually featuring hand-drawn or computer animation) are based on Japanese video games, particularly visual novels and JRPGs. For example, the Pokémon TV series debuted in 1997 and is based on the Pokémon video games released in 1996 for the Game Boy.

== List ==
Anime	Video game	Year	Type
3Ping Lovers! Ippu Nisai no Sekai e Yōkoso the Animation	3Ping Lovers! Ippu Nisai no Sekai e Yōkoso	2015	OVA film
9-Nine: Ruler's Crown	9-Nine	2025	TV series
11eyes	11eyes: Tsumi to Batsu to Aganai no Shōjo	2009	TV series
18if	18: Dream World	2017	TV series
100 Sleeping Princes and the Kingdom of Dreams	100 Sleeping Princes and the Kingdom of Dreams	2018	TV series
100 Sleeping Princes and the Kingdom of Dreams: Short Stories	100 Sleeping Princes and the Kingdom of Dreams	2017	ONA series
A3! Season Autumn & Winter	A3!	2020	TV series
A3! Season Spring & Summer	A3!	2020	TV series
Abaddon: Princess of the Decay the Animation	Abaddon: Princess of the Decay	2020	ONA film
Ace Attorney	Ace Attorney	2016 – 2019	TV series
After... The Animation	After...	2007 – 2008	OVA series
After Class Lesson	Hōkago: Nureta Seifuku	2005	OVA series
Afterlost	Afterlost	2019	TV series
Ai Mai! Moe Can Change!	Moe Can Change! Me & MyRoid	2012	OVA film
Aibeya the Animation	Aibeya	2019	OVA film
Aikagi the Animation	Aikagi	2019	OVA film
Aikatsu! x PriPara The Movie: A Miracle Encounter!	PriPara	2025	Film
Air	Air	2005	TV series
Air	Air	2005	Film
Aisai Nikki	Aisai Nikki	2010	OVA film
Akane Maniax	Akane Maniax 〜Nagareboshi Densetsu Gouda〜	2004 – 2005	OVA series
Akaneiro ni Somaru Saka	Akaneiro ni Somaru Saka	2008	TV series
Akiba Girls	Akiba Girls	2004 – 2006	OVA series
Akiba's Trip: The Animation	Akiba's Trip	2017	TV series
Akiko	Akiko	1996	OVA series
Akindo Sei no Little Peso	Akindo Sei no Little Peso	2017	TV series
Alice Gear Aegis Expansion	Alice Gear Aegis	2023	TV series
Alice Gear Aegis: Heart Pounding! Actress Packed Mermaid Grand Prix!	Alice Gear Aegis	2021	OVA film
Alice in the Country of Hearts: Wonderful Wonder World	Alice in the Country of Hearts	2011	Film
Alice in Cyberland	Alice in Cyberland	1996	TV film
Amada Anime Series: Super Mario Bros.	Super Mario Bros.	1989	OVA series
Amagami SS	Amagami	2010	TV series
Amagami SS+ plus	Amagami	2012	TV series
Amakano	Amakano	2016 – 2017	OVA series
Amnesia	Amnesia	2013	TV series
Amy's Fantasies	Amy's Fantasies	1997	OVA series
Anal Sanctuary	Requiem	2005	OVA series
Anata wa Watashi no Mono: Do S Kanojo to Do M Kareshi	Anata wa Watashi no Mono: Do S Kanojo to Do M Kareshi	2017	OVA series
Ancient Ruler Dinosaur King DKidz Adventure	Dinosaur King	2007 – 2008	TV series
Ancient Ruler Dinosaur King DKidz Adventure: Pterosaur Legend	Dinosaur King	2008	TV series
Ane Haramix	Ane Haramix	2006 – 2007	OVA series
Ane Yome Quartet	Ane Yome Quartet	2015 – 2016	OVA series
Anejiru the Animation: Shirakawa Sanshimai ni Omakase	Anejiru: Shirakawa Sanshimai ni Omakase	2006 – 2007	OVA series
Anejiru 2 the Animation: Shirakawa Shimai ni Omakase	Anejiru: Shirakawa Sanshimai ni Omakase	2010 – 2011	OVA series
Angel Core	Angel Core	2003	OVA series
Angel Tear: Goddess Betrayed	Angel Tear: Goddess Betrayed	2014 – 2016	OVA series
Angel's Feather	Angel's Feather	2006	OVA series
Angelique	Angelique	2004 – 2005	OVA series
Angelique: Seichi yori Ai o Komete	Angelique	2001	OVA series
Angelique: Shiroi Tsubasa no Memoire	Angelique	2000	OVA series
Angelique Twin Collection	Angelique	2002 – 2003	OVA series
Angelium	Angelium: Tokimeki Love God	2004	OVA series
Angels in the Court	Angels in the Court	2000	OVA series
Angels of Death	Angels of Death	2018	TV series
Aniki no Yome-san nara, Ore ni Hamerarete Hiihii Itteru Tokoro da yo	Aniki no Yome-san nara, Ore ni Hamerarete Hiihii Itteru Tokoro da yo	2015	OVA film
Another World: Kyo Chapter	Clannad	2009	OVA film
Another World: Tomoyo Chapter	Clannad	2008	OVA film
Anyone You Can Do... I Can Do Better!	Milk Junkie	2004	OVA series
Ao Oni: The Animation	Ao Oni	2016 – 2017	TV series
Ao Oni: The Animation	Ao Oni	2017	Film
Aokana - Four Rhythms Across the Blue	Aokana - Four Rhythms Across the Blue	2016	TV series
Ape Escape	Ape Escape	2002	TV series
Ar tonelico	Ar tonelico: Melody of Elemia	2006	OVA film
Arc the Lad	Arc the Lad	1999	TV series
Arisa	Moke Moke Taishō Dendō Musume Arisa	2005	OVA series
Arknights: Perish in Frost	Arknights	2023	TV series
Arknights: Prelude to Dawn	Arknights	2022	TV series
Arknights: Rise from Ember	Arknights	2025	TV series
Armored Warrior Iris	Armored Warrior Iris	2007 – 2009	OVA series
Art of Fighting	Art of Fighting	1993	TV film
As One	Starwing Paradox	2025	Film
Asa kara Zusshiri Milk Pot	Asa kara Zusshiri Milk Pot	2011 – 2012	OVA series
Ashita no Yukinojō	Ashita no Yukinojō	2002 – 2003	OVA series
Atelier Escha & Logy: Alchemists of the Dusk Sky	Atelier Escha & Logy: Alchemists of the Dusk Sky	2014	TV series
Atelier Ryza: Ever Darkness & the Secret Hideout	Atelier Ryza: Ever Darkness & the Secret Hideout	2023	TV series
Atri: My Dear Moments	Atri: My Dear Moments	2024	TV series
Ayakashi	Ayakashi	2007 – 2008	TV series
Ayumayu Theater	Kimi ga Nozomu Eien / Muv-Luv	2006 – 2007	ONA series
Azur Lane	Azur Lane	2019 – 2020	TV series
Azur Lane Queen's Orders	Azur Lane	2023	OVA series
Azur Lane: Slow Ahead!	Azur Lane	2021 – present	TV series
Azure Striker Gunvolt	Azure Striker Gunvolt	2017	ONA film
B-Chiku Beach: Nangoku Nyūjoku Satsueikai	B-Chiku Beach: Nangoku Nyūjoku Satsueikai	2011	OVA film
Baboo Factory	Astronōka	2001 – 2002	TV series
Baka Dakedo Chinchin Shaburu no dake wa Jōzu na Chii-chan	Baka Dakedo Chinchin Shaburu no dake wa Jōzu na Chii-chan	2017	OVA series
Baka na Imōto o Rikō ni Suru no wa Ore no xx Dake na Ken ni Tsuite	Baka na Imōto o Rikō ni Suru no wa Ore no xx Dake na Ken ni Tsuite	2016	OVA series
Baku Ane: Otōto Shibocchau zo! The Animation	Baku Ane: Otōto Shibocchau zo!	2014	OVA film
Baku Ane 2: Otōto Ippai Shibocchau zo! The Animation	Baku Ane 2: Otōto Ippai Shibocchau zo!	2017	OVA film
Bakumatsu	Renai Bakumatsu Kareshi	2018	TV series
Bakumatsu Crisis	Renai Bakumatsu Kareshi	2019	TV series
BALDR FORCE EXE Resolution	Baldr Force	2006 – 2007	OVA series
Battle Arena Toshinden	Battle Arena Toshinden	1996	OVA series
Battle Girl High School	Battle Girl High School	2017	TV series
Battle Team Lakers EX	Sei Shōjo Sentai Lakers	1996	OVA film
Bayonetta: Bloody Fate	Bayonetta	2013	Film
Be-yond	Be-yond	1998	OVA series
Beat Angel Escalayer	Beat Angel Escalayer	2002 – 2003	OVA series
Beat Blades Haruka	Beat Blades Haruka	2009 – 2010	OVA series
Between the Sky and Sea	Between the Sky and Sea	2018	TV series
Bible Black	Bible Black	2001 – 2003	OVA series
Bible Black: New Testament	Bible Black	2004 – 2007	OVA series
Bible Black Only	Bible Black	2005 – 2006	OVA series
Bible Black: Origins	Bible Black	2002	OVA series
Bijukubo	Bijukubo	2010	OVA series
Bikyaku Seido Kaichō Ai	Bikyaku Seido Kaichō Ai	2014	OVA film
Binkan Athlete	Binkan Athlete	2009	OVA film
Biohazard 4: Incubate	Resident Evil	2006	OVA film
Biohazard 4D-Executer	Resident Evil	2000	Film
Bitch Gakuen ga Seijun na Hazu ga Nai!!? The Animation	Bitch Gakuen ga Seijun na Hazu ga Nai!!?	2019	OVA series
The Bizarre Cage	The Bizarre Cage	2001	OVA series
Black Gate	Black Gate	2004	OVA series
Black Widow	Kurohime	2002 – 2003	OVA series
The Blackmail: Tomorrow Never Ends	Kyōhaku	1999 – 2000	OVA series
The Blackmail II: The Animation	Kyōhaku	2001 – 2002	OVA series
Blade & Soul	Blade & Soul	2014	TV series
BlazBlue Alter Memory	BlazBlue	2013	TV series
Blood Royale	Blood Royale	2002	OVA series
Blood Shadow	Guren	2001 – 2002	OVA series
Bloods: Inraku no Ketsuzoku 2	Bloods: Inraku no Ketsuzoku 2	2011	OVA series
Blue Archive the Animation	Blue Archive	2024	TV series
Blue Archive: 1.5th Anniversary Short Animation	Blue Archive	2022	ONA film
Blue Archive: Beautiful Day Dreamer	Blue Archive	2022	ONA film
Blue Dragon	Blue Dragon	2007 – 2008	TV series
Blue Dragon: Trials of the Seven Shadows	Blue Dragon	2008 – 2009	TV series
Blue Reflection Ray	Blue Reflection	2021	TV series
Body Transfer	Body Transfer	2003 – 2004	OVA series
Boin	Boin	2005 – 2006	OVA series
Boku to Joi no Shinsatsu Nisshi the Animation	Boku to Joi no Shinsatsu Nisshi	2019	OVA film
Boku to Nurse no Kenshū Nisshi the Animation	Boku to Nurse no Kenshū Nisshi	2018	OVA film
Bomberman B-Daman Bakugaiden	Bomberman	1998 – 1999	TV series
Bomberman B-Daman Bakugaiden V	Bomberman	1999 – 2000	TV series
Bomberman Jetters	Bomberman	2002 – 2003	TV series
Bondage 101	Chōbatsu Yobikō Zenryōsei	2004	OVA series
Bondage Game	Bondage Game	2003 – 2004	OVA series
Bondage Mansion	Bondage Mansion	2000	OVA series
Bonjour Sweet Love Patisserie	Bonjour Sweet Love Patisserie	2014 – 2015	ONA series
Boobalicious	Milk Junkie 2	2005 – 2006	OVA series
Booby Life!	Booby Life!	2008 – 2009	OVA series
The Boundary Between Dream and Reality	Mugen no Kyōkai: Kiseki no Umi	2000 – 2001	OVA series
Brave Alchemist Colette	Brave Alchemist Colette	2022 – 2023	OVA series
Brave Princess Milia	Brave Princess Milia	2023 – 2024	OVA series
Brotherhood: Final Fantasy XV	Final Fantasy XV	2016	ONA series
Bug tte Honey: Megarom Shōjo Mai 4622	Adventure Island	1987	Film
Bungo and Alchemist: Gears of Judgement	Bungo and Alchemist	2020	TV series
Busō Shōjotai Blade Briders the Animation	Busō Shōjotai Blade Briders	2015	OVA film
Buta Hime-sama	Buta Hime-sama	2011	OVA film
Buta no Gotoki Sanzoku ni Torawarete Shojo o Ubawareru Kyonyū Himekishi & Onna Senshi: Zettai Chinpo nanka ni Maketari Shinai!! The Animation	Buta no Gotoki Sanzoku ni Torawarete Shojo o Ubawareru Kyonyū Himekishi & Onna Senshi: Zettai Chinpo nanka ni Maketari Shinai!!	2015	OVA film
Cafe Junkie	Cafe Junkie	2008 – 2009	OVA series
Caligula	The Caligula Effect	2018	TV series
Campus	Campus	2000 – 2001	OVA series
Can Can Bunny Extra	Can Can Bunny Extra	1996 – 1997	OVA series
Canaan	428: Shibuya Scramble	2009	TV series
Canary	Canary	2002	OVA film
Cantaloupe Collector	Tsuma to Mama to Boin	2007	OVA series
Canvas: Sepia-iro no Motif	Canvas: Sepia-iro no Motif	2001 – 2002	OVA series
Canvas 2: Niji Iro no Sketch	Canvas 2: Akane-iro no Palette	2005 – 2006	TV series
Carnival Phantasm	Fate/Stay Night / Tsukihime	2011	OVA series
Cartagra: Tsukigurui no Yamai	Cartagra: Tsukigurui no Yamai	2009	OVA series
The Case Book of Arne	The Case Book of Arne	2026	TV series
Castle Fantasia: Seima Taisen	Castle Fantasia: Seima Taisen	2003	OVA series
Casual Romance Club: L'etude de l'amour	Casual Romance Club: L'etude de l'amour	1998	OVA series
Cerberus	Seisen Cerberus	2016	TV series
Chain Chronicle: The Light of Haecceitas	Chain Chronicle	2017	TV series
Chain Chronicle: Short Animation	Chain Chronicle	2014	OVA series
Chains of Lust	Ryōjoku no Rensa	2003 – 2004	OVA series
Chaos;Child	Chaos;Child	2017	TV series
Chaos;Child: Silent Sky	Chaos;Child	2017	Film
Chaos;Head	Chaos;Head	2008	TV series
Chijoku no Seifuku	Chijoku no Seifuku	2016	OVA series
Chōsoku Henkei Gyrozetter	Chōsoku Henkei Gyrozetter	2012 – 2013	TV series
Chu Shite Agechau: Oshikake Onee-san no Seikō Chiryō	Chu Shite Agechau: Oshikake Onee-san no Seikō Chiryō	2013	OVA series
Cinderella Nine	Cinderella Nine	2019	TV series
Circlet Princess	Circlet Princess	2019	TV series
Clannad	Clannad	2007	Film
Clannad	Clannad	2007 – 2008	TV series
Clannad After Story	Clannad	2008 – 2009	TV series
Class Reunion	Class Reunion	1997 – 1998	OVA series
Class Reunion Again	Class Reunion	2002	OVA series
Classroom of Atonement	Shokuzai no Kyōshitsu: The Seven Stories of Sin	2002 – 2003	OVA series
Cleavage	Cleavage	2006	OVA series
Code:Realize − Guardian of Rebirth	Code: Realize − Guardian of Rebirth	2017	TV series
Colorful Stage! The Movie: A Miku Who Can't Sing	Hatsune Miku: Colorful Stage!	2025	Film
Comic Party	Comic Party	2001	TV series
Comic Party Revolution	Comic Party	2003 – 2004	OVA series
Comic Party Revolution	Comic Party	2005	TV series
#Compass: Combat Providence Analysis System	#Compass: Combat Providence Analysis System	2018 – 2019	ONA series
#Compass 2.0: Combat Providence Analysis System	#Compass: Combat Providence Analysis System	2025	TV series
Conception	Conception	2018	TV series
Concerto	Concerto	2001	OVA series
Consenting Adultery	Mrs. Junkie	2006 – 2007	OVA series
La Corda d'Oro: Blue Sky	La Corda d'Oro	2014	TV series
La Corda d'Oro: Primo Passo	La Corda d'Oro	2006 – 2007	TV series
La Corda d'Oro: Secondo Passo	La Corda d'Oro	2009	TV film
Corpse Party: Missing Footage	Corpse Party	2012	OVA film
Corpse Party: Tortured Souls	Corpse Party	2013	OVA series
Cosmic Fantasy: Galaxy Cougar's Trap	Cosmic Fantasy	1994	OVA film
Cosmo Warrior Zero	Cosmo Warrior Zero	2001	TV series
Cosplay Cafe	Hitozuma Cosplay Kissa	2004	OVA series
Cosplay Roshutsu Kenkyūkai	Cosplay Roshutsu Kenkyūkai	2011	OVA series
The Cougar Trap	Musuko no Tomodachi ni Okasarete	2009	OVA series
Crimson Climax	Hotaruko	2003	OVA series
Cue!	Cue!	2022	TV series
Custom Slave	Custom Slave	2001	OVA film
Cyberpunk: Edgerunners	Cyberpunk 2077	2022	ONA series
Cybuster	Super Robot Wars	1999	TV series
D-spray	D-spray	2013	OVA film
D+vine Luv	D+vine Luv	2001 – 2002	OVA series
Da Capo	Da Capo	2003	TV series
Da Capo: If	Da Capo	2008 – 2009	OVA series
Da Capo: Second Season	Da Capo	2005	TV series
Da Capo II	Da Capo II	2007	TV series
Da Capo II: Second Season	Da Capo II	2008	TV series
Da Capo III	Da Capo III	2013	TV series
Daiakuji: The Xena Buster	Daiakuji	2003 – 2005	OVA series
Dame×Prince Anime Caravan	Dame×Prince	2018	TV series
Danganronpa: The Animation	Danganronpa: Trigger Happy Havoc	2013	TV series
Danganronpa 3: The End of Hope's Peak High School	Danganronpa	2016	TV series
Darcrows	Darcrows	2003 – 2004	OVA series
Dark	Dark	2000	OVA series
Dark Blue	Dark Blue	2012 – 2013	OVA series
Dark Chapel	Seikōjo	2006	OVA series
Dark Future	Kurai Mirai	2006	OVA series
The Dark Knight Ingrid	Taimanin Murasaki: Kunoichi Kairai Dorei ni Otsu	2009 – 2010	OVA series
Dark Love	Dark Love	2005	OVA series
Darling	Darling	2003	OVA series
De:vadasy	De:vadasy	2000 – 2001	OVA series
Debts of Desire	Gakuen: Chijoku no Zushiki	2002	OVA series
Deemo: Memorial Keys	Deemo	2022	Film
Deep Voice	Deep Voice	2002	OVA series
Dekakute Ecchi na Ore no Ane	Dekakute Ecchi na Ore no Ane	2013	OVA film
Demon Busters: Ecchi na Ecchi na Demon Taiji the Animation	Demon Busters: Ecchi na Ecchi na Demon Taiji	2015	OVA film
Demonion: Gaiden	Demonion	2014 – 2015	OVA series
The Desert Island Story X	The Desert Island Story X: Gaiden	1998 – 1999	OVA series
The Desert Island Story XX	The Desert Island Story XX	1999 – 2000	OVA series
Destined for Love	Futari no Aniyome	2006 – 2007	OVA series
Devil May Cry: The Animated Series	Devil May Cry	2007	TV series
Devil Survivor 2: The Animation	Shin Megami Tensei: Devil Survivor 2	2013	TV series
The Devil's Virgins	Inyōchū Etsu: Kairaku Henka Taimaroku	2011	OVA series
Diabolik Lovers	Diabolik Lovers	2013	TV series
Diabolik Lovers More, Blood	Diabolik Lovers	2015	TV series
Diabolus: Kikoku	Diabolus: Kikoku	2009 – 2010	OVA series
Diamond Daydreams	Kita e	2004	TV series
Dies Irae	Dies Irae	2017	TV series
Digimon Adventure	Digimon	1999	TV series
Dimensional Adventure Numa Monjar	Chrono Trigger	1996	OVA film
Dirty by the Dozen	Jūninin no Onna Kyōshi	2008	OVA series
Dirty Laundry	Sentakuya Shin-chan	2007	OVA series
Dirty Thoughts	Private Emotion	2003	OVA series
Discipline: The Hentai Academy	Discipline: The Record of a Crusade	2003 – 2004	OVA series
Discipline Zero	Discipline: The Record of a Crusade	2010	OVA series
Discode	Discode	2004 – 2005	OVA series
Disney Twisted-Wonderland the Animation	Disney Twisted-Wonderland	2025 – present	ONA series
Divine Gate	Divine Gate	2016	TV series
Do You Know the MILFing Man?	Gibo no Toiki: Haitoku Shin ni Tadayou Haha no Iroka	2006	OVA series
Doctor Shameless	Chijoku Shinsatsushitsu	2003	OVA series
Dōkyūsei 2	Dōkyūsei 2	1996 – 1998	OVA series
Dōkyūsei 2 Special: Sotsugyōsei	Dōkyūsei 2	1999 – 2000	OVA series
Dōkyūsei Remake the Animation	Dōkyūsei	2022 – 2024	OVA series
Dōkyūsei: Climax	Dōkyūsei	1995 – 1996	OVA series
Dollhouse	Dollhouse	2003	OVA series
Dōra	Dōra	2001 – 2002	OVA series
Dorei Maid Princess	Dorei Maid Princess	2007 – 2009	OVA series
Double Duty Nurses	Tokubetsu Byōtō	2007 – 2008	OVA series
Download	Download	1992	OVA film
Dragon Age: Dawn of the Seeker	Dragon Age	2012	Film
Dragon Collection	Dragon Collection	2014 – 2015	TV series
Dragon Knight	Dragon Knight	1991	OVA film
Dragon Knight: Another Knight on the Town	Dragon Knight	1995	OVA film
Dragon Knight: The Wheel of Time	Dragon Knight 4	1998 – 1999	OVA series
Dragon Quest Saga: Emblem of Roto	Dragon Quest	1996	Film
Dragon Quest: The Adventure of Dai	Dragon Quest	1991 – 1992	TV series
Dragon Quest: The Adventure of Dai	Dragon Quest	2020 – 2022	TV series
Dragon Quest: The Great Adventure of Dai	Dragon Quest	1991	Film
Dragon Quest: The Great Adventure of Dai – Avan's Discilpes	Dragon Quest	1992	Film
Dragon Quest: The Great Adventure of Dai – Six Great Generals	Dragon Quest	1992	Film
Dragon Quest: Your Story	Dragon Quest V	2019	Film
Dragon Quest: Yūsha Abel Densetsu	Dragon Quest	1989 – 1991	TV series
Dragon Slayer: The Legend of Heroes	Dragon Slayer: The Legend of Heroes	1992	OVA series
Dragon's Dogma	Dragon's Dogma	2020	ONA series
Dragoon	Dragoon	1997	OVA series
DRAMAtical Murder	DRAMAtical Murder	2014	TV series
Dream Note	Ayatsuri Haramase Dream Note	2009 – 2011	OVA series
Dynamic Chord	Dynamic Chord	2017	TV series
Dyogrammaton	Dyogrammaton	2006 – 2007	OVA series
The Eden of Grisaia	The Eden of Grisaia	2015	TV series
Ef: A Tale of Melodies	Ef: A Fairy Tale of the Two	2008	TV series
Ef: A Tale of Memories	Ef: A Fairy Tale of the Two	2007	TV series
Efficus: Kono Omoi o Kimi ni...	Efficus: Kono Omoi o Kimi ni...	1998	OVA series
Eien no Aseria	Eien no Aseria	2005 – 2006	OVA series
Él	Él	2001	OVA series
Elf Hime Nina	Elf Hime Nina	2010 – 2012	OVA series
Elf no Futagohime Willan to Arsura	Elf no Futagohime Willan to Arsura	2009	OVA film
Elf-ban Kakyūsei	Kakyūsei	1997 – 1998	OVA series
End of Summer	Dōkyūsei	1994 – 1995	OVA series
Endless Serenade	Endless Serenade	2000	OVA film
Enkō JK Bitch Gal: Ojisan to Namapako Seikatsu	Enkō JK Bitch Gal: Ojisan to Namapako Seikatsu	2018	OVA series
Enkō Shōjo: Rikujōbu Yukki no Baai the Animation	Enkō Shōjo: Rikujōbu Yukki no Baai	2016	OVA film
Ensemble Stars!	Ensemble Stars!	2019	TV series
Ensemble Stars!! Recollection Selection: Checkmate	Ensemble Stars!	2024	ONA series
Ensemble Stars!! Recollection Selection: Crossroad	Ensemble Stars!	2023	ONA series
Ensemble Stars!! Recollection Selection: Element	Ensemble Stars!	2023	ONA series
Ensemble Stars!! Road to Show!!	Ensemble Stars!	2022	Film
Enzai: Falsely Accused	Enzai: Falsely Accused	2004	OVA series
Ero Ishi: Seijun Bishōjo wo Kotoba Takumi ni Hametai Hōdai	JK to Ero Ishi: Seijun Bishōjo JK o Kotoba Takumi ni Hametai Hōdai	2022	OVA series
Ero Konbini Tenchō	JK to Ero Konbini Tenchō	2019 – 2021	OVA series
Ero Manga! H mo Manga mo Step-up	Ero Manga! H mo Manga mo Step-up	2015 – 2016	OVA series
Ero Semi: Ecchi ni Yaruki ni ABC the Animation	Ero Semi: Ecchi ni Yaruki ni ABC	2017	OVA film
Eroge! H mo Game mo Kaihatsu Zanmai	Eroge! H mo Game mo Kaihatsu Zanmai	2011 – 2016	OVA series
Eroriman	JK to Eroriman	2022	OVA series
Eroriman 2	JK to Eroriman 2	2022	OVA series
Etsuraku no Tane the Animation	Etsuraku no Tane	2015	OVA film
Euphoria	Euphoria	2011 – 2016	OVA series
Evil Woman Executive	Evil Woman Executive	2011 – 2012	OVA series
Evil Woman Executive: Full Moon Night	Evil Woman Executive	2012	OVA film
Evil Woman Executive: Full Moon Night R	Evil Woman Executive	2020	OVA series
F-Force	Asgaldh: Waikyoku no Testament	2001 – 2002	OVA series
F-Zero GP Legend	F-Zero	2003 – 2004	TV series
The Fairy Tale You Don't Know	The Fairy Tale You Don't Know	2023	OVA series
Family Affair	Imōto de Ikō!	2003	OVA series
Fantasia Sango: Realm of Legends	Fantasia Sango	2022	TV series
Farmagia	Farmagia	2025	TV series
Fatal Fury: Legend of the Hungry Wolf	Fatal Fury: King of Fighters	1992	TV film
Fatal Fury: The Motion Picture	Fatal Fury	1994	Film
Fatal Fury 2: The New Battle	Fatal Fury 2	1993	TV film
Fate/Apocrypha	Fate/Stay Night	2017	TV series
Fate/Extra Last Encore	Fate/Extra	2018	TV series
Fate/Grand Carnival	Fate/Grand Order	2021	OVA series
Fate/Grand Order – Absolute Demonic Front: Babylonia	Fate/Grand Order	2019 – 2020	TV series
Fate/Grand Order x Himuro's World: Seven Most Powerful Great Figures Chapter	Fate/Grand Order	2017	TV film
Fate/Grand Order: Divine Realm of the Round Table – Camelot Paladin; Agateram	Fate/Grand Order	2021	Film
Fate/Grand Order: Divine Realm of the Round Table – Camelot Wandering; Agateram	Fate/Grand Order	2020	Film
Fate/Grand Order: Final Singularity-Grand Temple of Time: Solomon	Fate/Grand Order	2021	Film
Fate/Grand Order: First Order	Fate/Grand Order	2016	TV film
Fate/Grand Order: Moonlight/Lostroom	Fate/Grand Order	2017	TV film
Fate/Grand Order: You've Lost Ritsuka Fujimaru	Fate/Grand Order	2023 – 2025	ONA series
Fate/kaleid liner Prisma Illya	Fate/Stay Night	2013	TV series
Fate/kaleid liner Prisma Illya 2wei	Fate/Stay Night	2014	TV series
Fate/kaleid liner Prisma Illya 2wei Herz!	Fate/Stay Night	2015	TV series
Fate/kaleid liner Prisma Illya 3rei!!	Fate/Stay Night	2016	TV series
Fate/kaleid liner Prisma Illya: Licht - The Nameless Girl	Fate/Stay Night	2021	Film
Fate/kaleid liner Prisma Illya: Prisma Phantasm	Fate/Stay Night	2019	OVA film
Fate/kaleid liner Prisma Illya: Vow in the Snow	Fate/Stay Night	2017	Film
Fate/Stay Night	Fate/Stay Night	2006	TV series
Fate/Stay Night: Heaven's Feel I. presage flower	Fate/Stay Night	2017	Film
Fate/Stay Night: Heaven's Feel II. lost butterfly	Fate/Stay Night	2019	Film
Fate/Stay Night: Heaven's Feel III. spring song	Fate/Stay Night	2020	Film
Fate/Stay Night: Unlimited Blade Works	Fate/Stay Night	2010	Film
Fate/Stay Night: Unlimited Blade Works	Fate/Stay Night	2014 – 2015	TV series
Fate/Strange Fake	Fate/Stay Night	2024 – 2026	TV series
Fate/Strange Fake: Whispers of Dawn	Fate/Stay Night	2023	TV film
Fate/Zero	Fate/Stay Night	2011 – 2012	TV series
Fault!!	Fault!!	2009 – 2011	OVA series
Fault!! Service: Aratanaru Rival	Fault!! Service: Aratanaru Rival	2013	OVA film
Fight League: Gear Gadget Generators	Fight League	2019	ONA series
Final Approach	Final Approach	2004	TV series
Final Fantasy: Legend of the Crystals	Final Fantasy V	1994	OVA series
Final Fantasy: The Spirits Within	Final Fantasy	2001	Film
Final Fantasy: Unlimited	Final Fantasy	2001 – 2002	TV series
Final Fantasy VII: Advent Children	Final Fantasy VII	2005	Film
Final Fantasy VII: On the Way to a Smile – Episode: Denzel	Final Fantasy VII	2009	OVA film
Fire Emblem: Mystery of the Emblem	Fire Emblem: Mystery of the Emblem	1996	OVA series
First Kiss Story	First Kiss Story	2000	OVA film
Five Card	Five Card	2000 – 2001	OVA series
Fleshdance	Shimaizuma: Shimaizuma 3	2007	OVA series
Floating Material	Floating Material	2011	OVA series
Flutter of Birds II: Tenshi-tachi no Tsubasa	Flutter of Birds II: Tenshi-tachi no Tsubasa	2003	OVA series
Fly Out, PriPara: Aim for it with Everyone! Idol Grand Prix	PriPara	2015	Film
For Whom the Alchemist Exists	The Alchemist Code	2019	Film
Forbidden Love Club	Kimihagu	2009	OVA series
Fortune Arterial: Akai Yakusoku	Fortune Arterial	2010	TV series
Four for Fourplay	Aneimo 2: Second Stage	2008	OVA series
Free Friends the Animation	Free Friends	2014	OVA film
Free Friends 2	Free Friends 2	2018	OVA series
The Fruit of Grisaia	The Fruit of Grisaia	2014	TV series
Fruits Cup	Yūgū Settai: Kotō no Gokuraku e Yōkoso	2004 – 2005	OVA series
Fukubiki! Triangle: Futaba wa Atafuta	Fukubiki! Triangle	2015	OVA film
Fukubiki! Triangle: Miharu After	Fukubiki! Triangle	2010 – 2011	OVA series
Furyō ni Hamerarete Jusei Suru Kyonyū Okaasan the Animation	Furyō ni Hamerarete Jusei Suru Kyonyū Okaasan	2013	OVA series
Fuurinkanzan	Fuurinkanzan	2013	OVA film
G-spot Express	Itazura	2005	OVA series
Gaist Crusher	Gaist Crusher	2013 – 2014	TV series
Gakuen 2	Gakuen 2: Ingyaku no Zushiki	2007 – 2008	OVA series
Gakuen 3: Karei Naru Etsujoku the Animation	Gakuen 3: Karei Naru Etsujoku	2011	OVA series
Gakuen Basara: Samurai High School	Sengoku Basara	2018	TV series
Gakuen de Jikan yo Tomare	Gakuen de Jikan yo Tomare	2015	OVA series
Gakuen Handsome	Gakuen Handsome	2016	TV series
Gakuen Handsome the Animation	Gakuen Handsome	2015	OVA film
Gakuen Heaven	Gakuen Heaven	2006	TV series
Gakuen no Ikenie: Nagusami Mono to Kashita Kyonyū Furyō Shōjo the Animation	Gakuen no Ikenie: Nagusami Mono to Kashita Kyonyū Furyō Shōjo	2015	OVA film
Gakuen Saimin Reido	Gakuen Saimin Reido	2010 – 2012	OVA series
Gakuen Shinshoku: ×× of the Dead	×× of the Dead	2017	OVA series
Gakuen Toshi Varanoir: Kingdom of Chaos the Universe	Gakuen Toshi Varanoir: Kingdom of Chaos the Universe	2002	OVA series
Galaxy Angel	Galaxy Angel	2001 – 2004	TV series
Galaxy Fräulein Yuna	Galaxy Fräulein Yuna	1995	OVA series
Galaxy Fräulein Yuna Returns	Galaxy Fräulein Yuna	1996 – 1997	OVA series
Galerians: Rion	Galerians	2002	OVA series
Game Tengoku	Game Tengoku	1997	OVA film
Ganbare Goemon	Ganbare Goemon	1997 – 1998	TV series
Ganbare Goemon: Chikyū Kyūshutsu Daisakusen	Ganbare Goemon	1998	OVA film
Ganbare Goemon: Jigen Jō no Akumu	Ganbare Goemon	1993	OVA film
Gate Keepers	Gate Keepers	2000	TV series
Gate Keepers 21	Gate Keepers	2002 – 2003	OVA series
Gekijōban Collar × Malice Deep Cover	Collar × Malice	2023	Film
Gekijōban Dōbutsu no Mori	Animal Crossing	2006	Film
Gekijōban Meiji Tokyo Renka: Hana Kagami no Fantasia	Meiji Tokyo Renka	2016	Film
Gekijōban Meiji Tokyo Renka: Yumihari no Serenade	Meiji Tokyo Renka	2015	Film
Generation of Chaos	Generation of Chaos	2001	OVA film
Generation of Chaos III: Toki no Fūin	Generation of Chaos III: Toki no Fūin	2003	OVA series
Generation of Chaos Next	Generation of Chaos Next	2002	OVA film
Genmukan: The Sin of Desire & Shame	Genmukan: The Sin of Desire & Shame	2003	OVA series
Gift: Eternal Rainbow	Gift	2006	TV series
Girl Friend Beta	Girl Friend Beta	2014	TV series
Girl Friend Note	Girl Friend Note	2016	ONA series
Girl in the Shell	Kara no Shōjo	2010	OVA series
Girl Next Door	Girl Next Door	2000	OVA series
Girls Beyond the Wasteland	Girls Beyond the Wasteland	2016	TV series
Girls' Frontline	Girls' Frontline	2022	TV series
Gitai Saimin	Gitai Saimin	2011	OVA series
Glamorous Heroes	300 Battle: Glamorous Heroes	2017	TV series
Gloria	Gloria	1997	OVA series
Gnosia	Gnosia	2025 – 2026	TV series
God Eater	Gods Eater Burst	2015 – 2016	TV series
A Good Librarian Like a Good Shepherd	A Good Librarian Like a Good Shepherd	2014	TV series
Graduation	Graduation	1995	OVA series
Granblue Fantasy: The Animation	Granblue Fantasy	2017	TV series
Granblue Fantasy: The Animation Season 2	Granblue Fantasy	2019	TV series
Grand Blues!	Granblue Fantasy	2020	TV series
Green Green	Green Green	2002	OVA film
Green Green	Green Green	2003	TV series
Green Green: Erolutions	Green Green	2004	OVA film
Grimms Notes: The Animation	Grimms Notes	2019	TV series
Grisaia: Phantom Trigger	Grisaia: Phantom Trigger	2025	TV series
Grisaia: Phantom Trigger the Animation	Grisaia: Phantom Trigger	2019	Film
Grisaia: Phantom Trigger the Animation Stargazer	Grisaia: Phantom Trigger	2020	Film
Grope: Yami no naka no Kotori-tachi	Grope: Yami no naka no Kotori-tachi	2007 – 2008	OVA series
Growlanser IV: Wayfarer of Time	Growlanser: Wayfarer of Time	2005	OVA film
Guilty Gear Strive: Dual Rulers	Guilty Gear Strive	2025	TV series
GunBare! Game Tengoku 2	GunBare! Game Tengoku 2	1998	OVA film
Gungrave	Gungrave	2003 – 2004	TV series
Gunparade March	Gunparade March	2003	TV series
Gunparade Orchestra	Gunparade March	2005 – 2006	TV series
Gunslinger Stratos: The Animation	Gunslinger Stratos	2015	TV series
Gyakuten Majo Saiban: Chijo na Majo ni Sabakarechau the Animation	Gyakuten Majo Saiban: Chijo na Majo ni Sabakarechau	2015	OVA film
H_{2}O: Footprints in the Sand	H_{2}O: Footprints in the Sand	2008	TV series
.hack//Legend of the Twilight	.hack	2003	TV series
.hack//Liminality	.hack	2002 – 2003	OVA series
.hack//Quantum	.hack	2010 – 2011	OVA series
.hack//Roots	.hack	2006	TV series
.hack//Sign	.hack	2002	TV series
.hack//The Movie	.hack	2012	Film
Hagane Orchestra	Hagane Orchestra	2016	TV series
Hajimete no Orusuban	Hajimete no Orusuban	2020 – 2021	OVA series
Hakoiri Shōjo: Virgin Territory	Hakoiri Shōjo: Virgin Territory	2011 – 2012	OVA series
Hakuoki	Hakuoki	2021 – 2022	OVA series
Hakuoki: Dawn of the Shinsengumi	Hakuoki	2012	TV series
Hakuoki: Demon of the Fleeting Blossom	Hakuoki	2010	TV series
Hakuoki: A Memory of Snow Flowers	Hakuoki	2011 – 2012	OVA series
Hakuoki: Otogisōshi	Hakuoki	2016	TV series
Hakuoki: Record of the Jade Blood	Hakuoki	2010	TV series
Hakuoki: Warrior Spirit of the Blue Sky	Hakuoki	2014	Film
Hakuoki: Wild Dance of Kyoto	Hakuoki	2013	Film
Halo Legends	Halo	2010	Film
Hamidashi Creative	Hamidashi Creative	2024	TV series
Hanayaka Nari, Waga Ichizoku: Kinetograph	Hanayaka Nari, Waga Ichizoku	2012 – 2013	OVA series
Handle with Care..	Handle with Care..	2002	OVA film
Happiness!	Happiness!	2006	TV series
Haramasete Seiryū-kun!	Haramasete Seiryū-kun!: Jingi Naki Onna no Tatakai	2011 – 2012	OVA series
Hardcore Hospital	Shiroki Tenshi-tachi no Rondo	2002	OVA series
Harem of the Hell Spawn	Inyōchū Shoku: Ryōshokujima Taimaroku	2017	OVA film
Haru no Ashioto the Movie: Ourin Dakkan	Haru no Ashioto	2006	OVA film
Haruka: Beyond the Stream of Time – A Tale of the Eight Guardians	Haruka: Beyond the Stream of Time	2004 – 2005	TV series
Harukanaru Toki no Naka de: Ajisai Yumegatari	Haruka: Beyond the Stream of Time	2002 – 2003	OVA series
Harukanaru Toki no Naka de: Hachiyō Shō	Haruka: Beyond the Stream of Time	2005 – 2006	OVA series
Harukanaru Toki no Naka de: Maihitoyo	Haruka: Beyond the Stream of Time	2006	Film
Harukanaru Toki no Naka de 2: Shiroki Ryū no Miko	Harukanaru Toki no Naka de 2	2003 – 2005	OVA series
Harukanaru Toki no Naka de 3: Kurenai no Tsuki	Harukanaru Toki no Naka de 3	2007	TV film
Harukanaru Toki no Naka de 3: Owari Naki Unmei	Harukanaru Toki no Naka de 3	2010	TV film
Harukoi Otome: Otome no Sono de Aimashō	Harukoi Otome: Otome no Sono de Gokigen'yō	2008	OVA series
Hataraku Otona no Renai Jijō the Animation	Hataraku Otona no Renai Jijō	2016	OVA film
Hatsukoi	Hatsukoi	2004	OVA series
Heartful Maman the Animation	Heartful Maman	2017	OVA film
Heartwork: Love Guns	Heartwork	2003 – 2004	OVA series
A Heat for All Seasons	Kiss yori...	1999	OVA series
Helter Skelter: Hakudaku no Mura	Helter Skelter: Hakudaku no Mura	2009 – 2014	OVA series
Heritage From Father	Tsubaki-iro no Prigione	2002	OVA series
Hero Bank	Hero Bank	2014 – 2015	TV series
Hi☆sCoool! SeHa Girls	Multiple Sega properties	2014	TV series
Higurashi no Naku Koro ni Kaku: Outbreak	Higurashi When They Cry	2013	OVA film
Higurashi no Naku Koro ni Kira	Higurashi When They Cry	2011 – 2012	OVA series
Higurashi When They Cry	Higurashi When They Cry	2006	TV series
Higurashi When They Cry: Gou	Higurashi When They Cry	2020 – 2021	TV series
Higurashi When They Cry: Kai	Higurashi When They Cry	2007	TV series
Higurashi When They Cry: Nekogoroshi Chapter	Higurashi When They Cry	2007	OVA film
Higurashi When They Cry: Rei	Higurashi When They Cry	2009	OVA series
Higurashi When They Cry: Sotsu	Higurashi When They Cry	2021	TV series
Hiiro no Kakera: The Tamayori Princess Saga	Hiiro no Kakera	2012	TV series
The Hills Have Size	Hitozuma Kasumi-san: Oyako to Kyōdō Seikatsu	2005 – 2006	OVA series
Hime Dorei	Hime Dorei: Mesu e to Ochiyuku Futago no Ōjo	2008	OVA series
Hime-sama Love Life!	Hime-sama Love Life!	2019 – 2020	OVA series
Himekishi Lilia	Himekishi Lilia: Mashoku no Ōjō ni Otsu	2006 – 2010	OVA series
Himitsu no AiPri	Himitsu no AiPri	2024 – 2026	TV series
Himitsu no AiPri: Mankai Buzzlume Live!	Himitsu no AiPri	2026	Film
Hitō Meguri Kakure Yu	Hitō Meguri: Yokujō Jūrin Onsen Ki	2010 – 2011	OVA series
Hitō Meguri Kakure Yu: Mao-hen	Zoku Hitō Meguri	2013	OVA series
Hitō Meguri the Animation	Hitō Meguri: Yokujō Jūrin Onsen Ki	2006	OVA film
Hitozuma Cosplay Kissa 2: Hitozuma Love Love Cosplay OVA	Hitozuma Cosplay Kissa 2	2007	OVA series
Hōkago 2 the Animation	Hōkago 2: Hakudaku no Lesson	2007	OVA film
Hōkago 2: Sayuri	Hōkago 2: Hakudaku no Lesson	2008	OVA film
Hōkago Mania Club: Koi no Hoshii no the Animation	Hōkago Mania Club: Koi no Hoshii no	2003	OVA series
Holy Knight Light	Arknights	2020	ONA film
Holy Knight Luviria	Holy Knight Luviria	2019	OVA series
Holy Virgins	Tres Marias: 3 Nin no Sei Shojo	2001	OVA series
Home Sweet Orgy	Sweet Home: My Sexy Roommates	2011	OVA series
Honey Bee in Toycomland	Adventure Island	1986 – 1987	TV series
Honō no Haramase Motto! Hatsuiku! Karada Sokutei 2 the Animation	Honō no Haramase Motto! Hatsuiku! Karada Sokutei 2	2015	OVA film
Honō no Haramase Oppai: Ero Appli Gakuen the Animation	Honō no Haramase Oppai: Ero Appli Gakuen	2017 – 2018	OVA series
Honō no Haramase Paidol My Star Gakuen Z the Animation	Honō no Haramase Paidol My Star Gakuen Z	2015	OVA film
Honō no Haramase Tenkōsei	Honō no Haramase Tenkōsei	2006 – 2007	OVA series
Hooligan	Hooligan	2001 – 2002	OVA series
Horny Ladies and the News	Jokuana	2007	OVA series
Hortensia Saga	Hortensia Saga	2021	TV series
Hoshi no Shima no Nyanko	Hoshi no Shima no Nyanko	2018 – 2019	TV series
Hoshizora e Kakaru Hashi	Hoshizora e Kakaru Hashi	2011	TV series
Hot Juicy Teacher	Onna Kyōshi	2002 – 2003	OVA series
House of 5 Lusts	Reijoku no Yakata: Innen 5 Shimai Jukanki	2010	OVA series
House of 100 Tongues	Mozu no Nie	2003	OVA film
How to Build a Magnificent Kingdom	How to Build a Magnificent Kingdom	2019	OVA series
Humiliated Wives	Jokutsuma: Goriyō wa Keikakuteki ni	2007 – 2008	OVA series
Hyakki: The Secret of Devil's Island	Hyakki: Inmoku Sareta Haikyo	2003	OVA series
Hyōdō Ibuki: Kanpeki Ibuki Kaichō ga Kōsoku Do M!? na Wake	Hyōdō Ibuki: Kanpeki Ibuki Kaichō ga Kōsoku Do M!? na Wake	2015 – 2016	OVA series
Hyperdimension Neptunia: The Animation	Hyperdimension Neptunia	2013	TV series
Hyperdimension Neptunia: Hidamari no Little Purple	Hyperdimension Neptunia	2022	OVA film
Hyperdimension Neptunia: Nep Nep Darake no Festival	Hyperdimension Neptunia	2021	OVA film
Hyperdimension Neptunia: Nepu no Natsuyasumi	Hyperdimension Neptunia	2019	OVA film
HypnoLove	Saimin Gakuen	2008	OVA series
I Can	I Can	2010 – 2015	OVA series
I Love You	I Love You	2001 – 2002	OVA series
I-Chu: Halfway Through the Idol	I-Chu	2021	TV series
Idol Fighter Su-Chi-Pai	Idol Janshi Suchie-Pai II	1996	OVA film
Idol Land PriPara	Idol Land PriPara	2021 – 2024	ONA series
Idol Time PriPara	PriPara	2017 – 2018	TV series
Idolish7	Idolish7	2018	TV series
Idolish7 the Movie Live 4bit Beyond the Period	Idolish7	2023	Film
Idolish7: First Beat!	Idolish7	2025	Film
Idolish7: Second Beat!	Idolish7	2020	TV series
Idolish7: Third Beat!	Idolish7	2021 – 2023	TV series
Idolish7: Vibrato	Idolish7	2018 – 2019	ONA series
The Idolmaster	The Idolmaster	2011	TV series
The Idolmaster Cinderella Girls	The Idolmaster Cinderella Girls	2015	TV series
The Idolmaster Cinderella Girls Theater	The Idolmaster Cinderella Girls	2017 – 2019	TV series
The Idolmaster Cinderella Girls Theater Extra Stage	The Idolmaster Cinderella Girls	2020 – 2021	ONA series
The Idolmaster Cinderella Girls U149	The Idolmaster Cinderella Girls	2023	TV series
The Idolmaster Live For You!	The Idolmaster Live For You!	2008	OVA film
The Idolmaster Million Live!	The Idolmaster Million Live!	2023	TV series
The Idolmaster Movie: Beyond the Brilliant Future!	The Idolmaster	2014	Film
The Idolmaster Shiny Colors	The Idolmaster Shiny Colors	2024	TV series
The Idolmaster Shiny Festa	The Idolmaster Shiny Festa	2012	OVA series
The Idolmaster SideM	The Idolmaster SideM	2017	TV series
The Idolmaster SideM Wake Atte Mini!	The Idolmaster SideM	2018	TV series
Idolmaster: Xenoglossia	The Idolmaster	2007	TV series
Iinari! Saimin Kanojo: Reizoku Sennō Nama Hame Seikatsu!!	Iinari! Saimin Kanojo: Reizoku Sennō Nama Hame Seikatsu!!	2015	OVA series
Ijō Chitai: Jikken Dorei	Ijō Chitai: Kanojo wa Boku no Jikken Dorei	2011 – 2012	OVA series
Ikémen Sengoku: Bromances Across Time	Ikemen Sengoku: Romances Across Time	2017	TV series
Ikusa Otome Suvia	Ikusa Otome Suvia	2007 – 2009	OVA series
Ikusa Otome Valkyrie 2	Ikusa Otome Valkyrie 2: Shu yo, Midara na Watashi o Oyurushi Kudasai...	2008 – 2011	OVA series
Ikusa Otome Valkyrie G	Ikusa Otome Valkyrie G: Ikusa Otome-tachi no Tasogare	2012	OVA series
Ikusa Otome Valkyrie Shinshō	Ikusa Otome Valkyrie: Anata ni Subete o Sasagemasu	2006 – 2007	OVA series
Ikuze! Gen-san	Hammerin' Hero	2008	ONA series
Immoral	Immoral	2005	OVA series
Immoral Sisters	Ai Shimai: Futari no Kajitsu	2001	OVA series
Immoral Sisters 2	Ai Shimai: Futari no Kajitsu	2003	OVA series
Immoral Sisters: Blossoming	Ai Shimai: Tsubomi... Kegashite Kudasai	2004	OVA series
The Immorals	Jokei Kazoku: Inbō	2006	OVA series
Imōto Jiru	Imōto Jiru	2003 – 2004	OVA series
Imōto to Sono Yūjin ga Ero Sugite Ore no Kokan ga Yabai	Imōto to Sono Yūjin ga Ero Sugite Ore no Kokan ga Yabai	2016	OVA series
Imouto Paradise!	Imouto Paradise!	2011 – 2012	OVA series
Imouto Paradise 2	Imouto Paradise 2	2013	OVA series
Imouto Paradise! 3 The Animation	Imouto Paradise! 3	2018	OVA series
In Search of the Lost Future	In Search of the Lost Future	2014	TV series
Inazuma Eleven	Inazuma Eleven	2008 – 2011	TV series
Inazuma Eleven GO	Inazuma Eleven GO	2011 – 2014	TV series
Inazuma Eleven GO vs. Danbōru Senki W	Inazuma Eleven GO / Little Battlers Experience	2012	Film
Inazuma Eleven GO: Kyūkyoku no Kizuna Gurifon	Inazuma Eleven GO	2011	Film
Inazuma Eleven the Movie: Prologue to the New Heroes	Inazuma Eleven	2024	Film
Inazuma Eleven the Movie: The Legendary Kickoff	Inazuma Eleven	2024	Film
Inazuma Eleven: Ares	Inazuma Eleven	2018	TV series
Inazuma Eleven: Chōjigen Dream Match	Inazuma Eleven	2014	Film
Inazuma Eleven: Orion no Kokuin	Inazuma Eleven	2018 – 2019	TV series
Inazuma Eleven: Outer Code	Inazuma Eleven	2016 – 2017	ONA series
Inazuma Eleven: Saikyō Gundan Ogre Shūrai	Inazuma Eleven	2010	Film
Ingress: The Animation	Ingress	2018	TV series
Inkō Kyōshi 4 feat. Ero Giin-sensei	JK to Inkō Kyōshi 4: Namaiki Model Shōjo Hen / JK to Ero Giin-sensei	2018	OVA series
Inmu Gakuen: Dame... Konna ni Nacchau no wa Yume no Naka dake nano...!	Inmu Gakuen: Dame... Konna ni Nacchau no wa Yume no Naka dake nano...!	2010	OVA film
Innocent Blue	Innocent Blue	2005 – 2006	OVA series
Inshitsu Otaku ni Ikareru Kanojo	Inshitsu Otaku ni Ikareru Kanojo	2011	OVA series
Interlude	Interlude	2004	OVA series
Internal Medicine	Shūchū Chiryōshitsu	2004	OVA series
Invasion of the Ball Busters	Kansen Ball Buster	2013	OVA film
Inyōchū the Animation	Inyōchū: Ryōshoku Gakuen Taimaroku	2006 – 2008	OVA series
Inyōchū Shoku: Ryōshokujima Taimaroku	Inyōchū Shoku: Ryōshokujima Taimaroku	2008	OVA series
Irodorimidori	Chunithm	2022	TV series
Isaku	Isaku	1997 – 1998	OVA series
Isaku Respect	Isaku	2001	OVA series
Island	Island	2018	TV series
It's a Family Affair	Ane to Boin	2005 – 2006	OVA series
Itoshi no Kotodama	Itoshi no Kotodama	2002	OVA series
Ixion Saga DT	Ixion Saga	2012 – 2013	TV series
Izumo	Izumo	2003 – 2005	OVA series
Izumo: Takeki Tsurugi no Senki	Izumo 2	2005	TV series
Jaku-San-Sei Million Arthur	Million Arthur	2015 – 2018	ONA series
Jashin Shōkan: Inran Kyonyū Oyako Ikenie Gishiki	Jashin Shōkan: Inran Kyonyū Oyako Ikenie Gishiki	2021	OVA series
Jewel BEM Hunter Lime	Jewel BEM Hunter Lime	1996 – 1997	OVA series
Jiburiru: The Devil Angel	Makai Tenshi Djibril	2004 – 2005	OVA series
Jiburiru: Second Coming	Makai Tenshi Djibril: Episode 2	2007 – 2009	OVA series
Jii Tōsaku	Jii Tōsaku	2002 – 2004	OVA series
Jisshūsei	Jisshūsei: Kiken na Kyōshitsu	2002	OVA film
Jitaku Keibiin	Jitaku Keibiin	2017	OVA series
Jitaku Keibiin	Jitaku Keibiin	2019	OVA series
Jitaku Keibiin 2	Jitaku Keibiin 2	2020 – 2021	OVA series
JK to Ero Giin-sensei	JK to Ero Giin-sensei	2012 – 2013	OVA series
JK to Ero Konbini Tenchō	JK to Ero Konbini Tenchō	2016 – 2017	OVA series
JK to Inkō Kyōshi 4	JK to Inkō Kyōshi 4: Namaiki Model Shōjo Hen	2011 – 2012	OVA series
JK to Orc Heidan: Aku Buta Oni ni Ryōgyaku Sareta Seijo Gakuen	JK to Orc Heidan: Aku Buta Oni ni Ryōgyaku Sareta Seijo Gakuen	2013 – 2014	OVA series
Jokei Kazoku III: Himitsu – The Anime	Jokei Kazoku III: Himitsu	2014	OVA film
Journey to Bloom	Hatsune Miku: Colorful Stage!	2023	ONA series
Jungle Wars	Jungle Wars	1991	OVA film
Jutaijima	Jutaijima	2014 – 2015	OVA series
Jūza Engi Engetsu Sangokuden	Jūza Engi Engetsu Sangokuden	2014	OVA film
Kaa-chan no Tomodachi ni Shikotteru Tokoro Mirareta. The Animation	Kaa-chan no Tomodachi ni Shikotteru Tokoro Mirareta.	2020	OVA film
Kaette Kita Court no Naka no Tenshi-tachi	Angels in the Court	2001 – 2002	OVA series
Kagachi-sama Onagusame Tatematsurimasu: Netorare Mura Inya Hanashi the Animation	Kagachi-sama Onagusame Tatematsurimasu: Netorare Mura Inya Hanashi	2013	OVA film
Kaginado	Kanon / Air / Clannad / Planetarian: The Reverie of a Little Planet / Little Busters! / Rewrite	2021 – 2022	TV series
Kagirohi: Shaku Kei	Kagirohi: Shaku Kei	2009 – 2010	OVA series
Kagirohi: Shaku Kei – Another	Kagirohi: Shaku Kei	2017 – 2018	OVA series
Kakyūsei	Kakyūsei	1999	TV series
Kakyūsei 2	Kakyūsei 2	2004	TV series
Kakyūsei 2: Anthology	Kakyūsei 2	2006	OVA series
Kakyūsei 2: Sketchbook	Kakyūsei 2	2007	OVA series
Kami-machi Sana-chan the Animation	Kami-machi Sana-chan	2019	OVA film
Kamigami no Asobi	Kamigami no Asobi	2014	TV series
Kan'in Tokkyū Michi Shio	Kan'in Tokkyū Michi Shio	2010	OVA series
KanColle: Let's Meet at Sea	Kantai Collection	2022 – 2023	TV series
KanColle: The Movie	Kantai Collection	2016	Film
Kangoku Senkan	Kangoku Senkan: Hidō no Sennō Kaizō Kōkai	2009 – 2010	OVA series
Kanojo × Kanojo × Kanojo	Kanojo × Kanojo × Kanojo	2009 – 2011	OVA series
Kanojo ga Mimai ni Konai Wake	Kanojo ga Mimai ni Konai Wake	2010 – 2013	OVA series
Kanojo wa Dare to demo Sex Suru.	Kanojo wa Dare to demo Sex Suru.	2015	OVA series
Kanon	Kanon	2002	TV series
Kanon	Kanon	2006 – 2007	TV series
Kanon Kazahana	Kanon	2003	OVA film
Kansen: Inyoku no Rensa	Kansen: Inyoku no Rensa	2009	OVA series
Kansen 2: Inzai Toshi	Kansen 2: Inzai Toshi	2010	OVA series
Kansen 3: Shuto Hōkai	Kansen 3: Shuto Hōkai	2010	OVA series
Kansen 5: The Daybreak	Kansen 5: The Daybreak	2012 – 2018	OVA series
Kantai Collection	Kantai Collection	2015	TV series
Kateikyōshi no Onee-san the Animation: H no Hensachi Agechaimasu	Kateikyōshi no Onee-san: H no Hensachi Agechaimasu	2007	OVA series
Kateikyōshi no Onee-san 2 the Animation: H no Hensachi Agechaimasu	Kateikyōshi no Onee-san: H no Hensachi Agechaimasu	2010 – 2011	OVA series
Katsugeki/Touken Ranbu	Touken Ranbu	2017	TV series
Kawarazaki-ke no Ichizoku the Animation	Kawarazaki-ke no Ichizoku	1996 – 1997	OVA series
Kawarazaki-ke no Ichizoku 2 the Animation	Kawarazaki-ke no Ichizoku 2	2004	OVA series
Kazoku: Haha to Shimai no Kyōsei	Kazoku: Haha to Shimai no Kyōsei	2021 – 2024	OVA series
Kedamono-tachi no Sumu Ie de: Daikirai na Saitei Kazoku to Kanojo to no Netorare Dōkyo Seikatsu	Kedamono-tachi no Sumu Ie de: Daikirai na Saitei Kazoku to Kanojo to no Netorare Dōkyo Seikatsu	2015	OVA series
Keibiin	Keibiin	2000 – 2001	OVA series
Keitai Shoujo	Keitai Shoujo	2007	ONA series
Kekkai	Kekkai: Aru Rinshō Shinrishi no Kiroku Yori	2002	OVA film
Kemono Friends	Kemono Friends	2017	TV series
Kemono Friends 2	Kemono Friends	2019	TV series
Kenka Bancho Otome: Girl Beats Boys	Kenka Banchō Otome	2017	TV series
Keraku-no-Oh: King of Pleasure	Keraku no Ou	2002	OVA series
Kid Icarus: Uprising	Kid Icarus: Uprising	2012	ONA series
Kikō Heidan J-Phoenix: PF Lips Shōtai	Kikō Heidan J-Phoenix	2002 – 2004	OVA series
Kimi ga Aruji de Shitsuji ga Ore de	Kimi ga Aruji de Shitsuji ga Ore de	2008	TV series
Kimi ga Nozomu Eien ~Next Season~	Kimi ga Nozomu Eien	2007 – 2008	OVA series
Kimi to Fit Boxing	Fitness Boxing	2021	TV series
KimiKiss: Pure Rouge	KimiKiss	2007 – 2008	TV series
Kindan no Byōtō the Animation	Kindan no Byōtō: Tokushu Seishinkai Yusa Sōsuke no Shinsatsu Kiroku	2012	OVA series
King of Breasts	Oppai no Ōja 48: Nani mo Kangaezu Me no Mae no Oppai Zenbu Shabure!	2010	OVA series
The King of Fighters: Another Day	KOF: Maximum Impact	2005 – 2006	ONA series
The King of Fighters: Destiny	The King of Fighters	2017 – 2018	ONA series
King of Prism All Stars: Prism Show Best Ten	Pretty Rhythm	2020	Film
King of Prism by Pretty Rhythm	Pretty Rhythm	2016	Film
King of Prism: Dramatic Prism.1	Pretty Rhythm	2024	Film
King of Prism: Pride the Hero	Pretty Rhythm	2017	Film
King of Prism: Shiny Seven Stars	Pretty Rhythm	2019	Film
King of Prism: Your Endless Call – Minna Kirameki! Prism☆Tours	Pretty Rhythm	2025	Film
King's Raid: Successors of the Will	King's Raid	2020 – 2021	TV series
Kingdom Hearts χ Back Cover	Kingdom Hearts χ	2017	OVA film
Kingsglaive: Final Fantasy XV	Final Fantasy XV	2016	Film
Kiratto Pri Chan	Kiratto Pri Chan	2018 – 2021	TV series
Kirby: Right Back at Ya!	Kirby	2001 – 2003	TV series
Kiriya Hakushakuke no Roku Shimai	Kiriya Hakushakuke no Roku Shimai	2011 – 2012	OVA series
Kisaku the Letch	Kisaku	2002 – 2003	OVA series
Kisaku Reiwa	Kisaku	2022	OVA film
Kisaku Spirit: The Letch Lives	Kisaku	2004 – 2005	OVA series
Kishin Houkou Demonbane	Demonbane	2004	OVA film
Kishin Houkou Demonbane	Demonbane	2006	TV series
Knight of Erin	Knight of Erin	2020 – 2021	OVA series
Ko Ko Ro	Ko Ko Ro	2001 – 2002	OVA series
Kohakuiro no Hunter the Animation	Kohakuiro no Hunter	2020 – 2021	OVA series
Koi suru Tenshi Angelique: Kagayaki no Ashita	Angelique	2007	TV series
Koi suru Tenshi Angelique: Kokoro no Mezameru Toki	Angelique	2006	TV series
Koi-ken!: Watashi-tachi Anime ni Natchatta!	Koi-ken!	2012	ONA series
Koihime	Koihime	2000	OVA series
Koihime Musō	Koihime Musō	2008	TV series
Koikishi Purely Kiss the Animation	Koikishi Purely Kiss	2013 – 2014	OVA series
Koinaka: Koinaka de Hatsukoi × Nakadashi Sexual Life the Animation	Koinaka: Koinaka de Hatsukoi × Nakadashi Sexual Life	2016	OVA film
Konbini Shōjo Z	Konbini Shōjo Z	2021 – 2022	OVA series
Kono Aozora ni Yakusoku o: Yōkoso Tsugumi Ryō e	Kono Aozora ni Yakusoku o	2007	TV series
Korashime 2: Kyōikuteki Depaga Shidō	Korashime 2: Kyōikuteki Depaga Shidō	2022 – 2023	OVA series
Kotowari: Kimi no Kokoro no Koboreta Kakera	Kotowari: Kimi no Kokoro no Koboreta Kakera	2013	OVA series
Kowaku no Toki	Kowaku no Toki	2011 – 2014	OVA series
Kud Wafter	Kud Wafter	2021	Film
Kugutsu Ai: Dōra Gaiden	Dōra III: Kairaiai	2001	OVA film
Kunoichi Sakuya	Kunoichi Sakuya: Shinobishi Omoi wa Chijoku ni Nurete...	2011	OVA series
Kuraibito	Kuraibito	2014	OVA film
Kuro no Kyōshitsu	Kuro no Kyōshitsu	2015 – 2016	OVA series
Kuro to Kin no Akanai Kagi	Kuro to Kin no Akanai Kagi	2013	OVA series
Kuroinu: Kedakaki Seijo wa Hakudaku ni Somaru	Kuroinu: Kedakaki Seijo wa Hakudaku ni Somaru	2012 – 2018	OVA series
Kuroinu II the Animation	Kuroinu II: In'yoku ni Somaru Haitoku no Miyako, Futatabi	2021	OVA film
Kurutta Kyōtō: Danzai no Gakuen	Kurutta Kyōtō: Danzai no Gakuen	2009	OVA film
Kussetsu	Kussetsu	2002	OVA series
Kutsujoku	Kutsujoku	2019	OVA series
Kutsujoku 2 the Animation	Kutsujoku 2	2020	OVA series
Kyonyū Daikazoku Saimin	Kyonyū Daikazoku Saimin	2017 – 2018	OVA series
Kyonyū Dosukebe Gakuen: Shojo-tachi no Tomaranai Koshizukai	Kyonyū Dosukebe Gakuen: Shojo-tachi no Tomaranai Koshizukai	2018	OVA series
Kyonyū Elf Oyako Saimin	Kyonyū Elf Oyako Saimin	2022	OVA series
Kyonyū Fantasy	Kyonyū Fantasy	2012	OVA series
Kyonyū Hitozuma Onna Kyōshi Saimin	Kyonyū Hitozuma Onna Kyōshi Saimin Keitai App de Sex Chūdoku!	2016	OVA series
Kyonyū Kazoku Saimin	Kyonyū Kazoku Saimin	2014	OVA film
Kyonyū Onna Senshi Dogeza Saimin	Kyonyū Onna Senshi Dogeza Saimin	2022	OVA series
Kyonyū Onna Shikan Sennō Saimin	Kyonyū Onna Shikan Sennō Saimin	2024	OVA series
Kyonyū Princess Saimin	Kyonyū Princess Saimin	2020	OVA series
Kyonyū Reijō MC Gakuen	Kyonyū Reijō MC Gakuen	2017	OVA series
Kyonyū Try!: Tanki Shūchū Chichi Momi Lesson	Kyonyū Try!: Tanki Shūchū Chichi Momi Lesson	2014	OVA film
Kyūketsuki	Kyūketsuki: Anal Hime Kōkan Chōkyō Roku	2011 – 2012	OVA series
The Labyrinth of Grisaia	The Labyrinth of Grisaia	2015	TV film
Lamune: Garasu Bin ni Utsuru Umi	Lamune	2005	TV series
Last Order: Final Fantasy VII	Final Fantasy VII	2005	OVA film
Last Period	Last Period	2018	TV series
Last Train to…Gropesville	Hissatsu Chikan Nin	2008	OVA series
Last Waltz: Hakudaku Mamire no Natsu Gasshuku	Last Waltz: Hakudaku Mamire no Natsu Gasshuku	2010	OVA series
LayereD Stories 0	LayereD Stories 0	2017 – 2018	ONA series
Layton Mystery Tanteisha: Katori no Nazotoki File	Layton's Mystery Journey	2018 – 2019	TV series
LBX Girls	Sōkō Musume	2021	TV series
Learn with Manga! Fate Grand/Order	Fate/Grand Order	2018	TV film
Learning the Hard Way	Learning the Hard Way	2007	OVA series
Lecherous Lessons	Kyōiku Shidō	2010	OVA film
Legend of the Black Eye: Kokudohoh	Kokudō Ō: Dōra II	2000 – 2002	OVA series
The Legend of Heroes: Trails in the Sky	The Legend of Heroes: Trails in the Sky SC	2011 – 2012	OVA series
The Legend of Heroes: Trails of Cold Steel – Northern War	Trails	2023	TV series
Legend of Himiko	Legend of Himiko	1999	TV series
Legend of Mana: The Teardrop Crystal	Legend of Mana	2022	TV series
Leviathan: The Last Defense	Leviathan: The Last Defense	2013	TV series
License to Sleaze	License to Sleaze	2012 – 2013	OVA series
Like a Mom	Mama Puri!?: Wagaya no Dōsei Tsūshinbo	2009	OVA series
Lilitales	Lilitales	2018	ONA series
Lilpri	Lilpri	2010 – 2012	TV series
Lime-iro Ryūkitan X	Lime-iro Ryūkitan X	2005	TV series
Lime-iro Senkitan	Lime-iro Senkitan	2003	TV series
Lime-iro Senkitan: The South Island Dream Romantic Adventure	Lime-iro Senkitan	2004	OVA series
Lingeries	Lingeries	2003 – 2004	OVA series
Little Battlers eXperience	Little Battlers Experience	2011 – 2012	TV series
Little Battlers eXperience W	Little Battlers Experience	2012 – 2013	TV series
Little Battlers eXperience Wars	Little Battlers Experience	2013	TV series
Little Busters!	Little Busters!	2012 – 2013	TV series
Little Busters! EX	Little Busters!	2014	OVA series
Little Busters! Refrain	Little Busters!	2013	TV series
Living Sex Toy Delivery	Nikuyoku Gangu Takuhainin	2002	OVA series
Lord El-Melloi II's Case Files: Rail Zeppelin Grace note	Fate/Stay Night	2019	TV series
Lord of Vermilion: The Crimson King	Lord of Vermilion	2018	TV series
Love × Holic: Miwaku no Otome to Hakudaku Kankei – The Animation	Love × Holic: Miwaku no Otome to Hakudaku Kankei	2019	OVA series
Love 2 Quad	Love 2 Quad	2012 – 2017	OVA series
Love and Berry: Dress Up and Dance – Magic of Happiness	Love and Berry: Dress Up and Dance!	2007	Film
Love Doll	Ai Doll	1997 – 2001	OVA series
Love, Election and Chocolate	Love, Election and Chocolate	2012	TV series
Love es M the Animation	Love es M	2014	OVA film
Love Forever	Love Forever	2001	OVA film
Love Get Chu: Miracle Seiyū Hakusho	Love Get Chu	2006	TV series
Love Lessons	Jinshin Yūgi: Moteasobareru Kokoro to Karada	2001	OVA series
Lovely × Cation the Animation	Lovely × Cation	2015	OVA series
Lover-in-Law	Lover-in-Law	2008	OVA series
Lunar Legend Tsukihime	Tsukihime	2003	TV series
Luv Wave	Luv Wave	2000	OVA series
M.E.M.: Yogosareta Junketsu	M.E.M.: Yogosareta Junketsu	2000	OVA series
Machi Gurumi no Wana: Hakudaku ni Mamireta Shitai	Machi Gurumi no Wana: Hakudaku ni Mamireta Shitai	2010 – 2014	OVA series
Madonna: Kanjuku Body Collection the Animation	Madonna: Kanjuku Body Collection	2014	OVA film
Magatsu Wahrheit -Zuerst-	Magatsu Wahrheit	2020	TV series
Magia Record	Magia Record	2020 – 2022	TV series
Magical Canan	Magical Kanan	2005	TV series
Magical Girl Noble Rose the Animation	Magical Girl Noble Rose	2023	OVA series
Magical Kanan	Magical Kanan	2000 – 2001	OVA series
Magical Kanan: Palpitating Summer Camp	Magical Kanan	2002 – 2003	OVA series
Magical Valkyrie Lyristia	Magical Valkyrie Lyristia	2023 – present	OVA series
Magical Witch Academy: Boku to Sensei no Magical Lesson – The Animation	Magical Witch Academy: Boku to Sensei no Magical Lesson	2007	OVA series
Mahjong Soul Kan!!	Mahjong Soul	2024	ONA series
Mahjong Soul Pong	Mahjong Soul	2022	TV series
Mahō Gakuen Lunar! Aoi Ryū no Himitsu	Mahō Gakuen Lunar!	1997	Film
Mahō Senshi Sweet Knights: Heroine Ryōjoku Shirei	Mahō Senshi Sweet Knights: Heroine Ryōjoku Shirei	2004	OVA series
Mahō Shōjo Erena	Mahō Shōjo Erena	2011 – 2013	OVA series
Mahō Shōjo Isuka	Mahō Shōjo Isuka	2010 – 2011	OVA series
Mahō Shōjo wa Kiss Shite Kawaru	Mahō Shōjo wa Kiss Shite Kawaru	2014	OVA film
Maid in Heaven	Maid in Heaven SuperS	2005	OVA series
Maid Service	Maid no Yakata: Zetsubō-hen	2002	OVA series
Maid to Please	Oshiete Re: Maid	2007 – 2008	OVA series
Maid-san to Boin Damashii the Animation	Maid-san to Boin Damashii	2015	OVA series
The Maiden Diaries	Kara no Naka no Kotori	1998 – 2000	OVA series
Maiden of Deliverance	Hinadori no Saezuri	2000 – 2001	OVA series
Maids in Dream	Maids in Dream	2003	OVA series
Maison Plaisir	Gekka Bijin	2002	OVA series
Majikoi - Oh! Samurai Girls	Maji de Watashi ni Koi Shinasai!	2011	TV series
Makai Senki Disgaea	Disgaea: Hour of Darkness	2006	TV series
Makai Tenshi Djibril 3	Makai Tenshi Djibril: Episode 3	2009 – 2010	OVA series
Makeruna! Makendo	Kendo Rage	1995	OVA film
Maki-chan to Nau.	Maki-chan to Nau.	2012 – 2014	OVA series
Mama × Holic: Miwaku no Mama to Amaama Kankei – The Animation	Mama × Holic: Miwaku no Mama to Amaama Kankei	2021	OVA series
Man'in Densha	Man'in Densha	2005 – 2009	OVA series
Mankitsu Happening	Mankitsu Happening	2015	OVA series
Manor of Mystic Courtesans	Manor of Mystic Courtesans	2020	OVA series
Maple Colors	Maple Colors	2004 – 2005	OVA series
MapleStory	MapleStory	2007 – 2008	TV series
Marginal Prince	Marginal Prince	2006	TV series
Marriage	Marriage	1996	OVA series
Marriage Blue: Konyakusha ga Iru no ni, Dōshite Konna Otoko ni...	Marriage Blue: Konyakusha ga Iru no ni, Dōshite Konna Otoko ni...	2013	OVA film
Mars of Destruction	Mars of Destruction	2005	OVA film
Marshmallow Imouto Succubus	Marshmallow Imouto Succubus	2016	OVA series
Masaru Ashita no Yukinojō 2	Masaru Ashita no Yukinojō 2	2003	OVA series
Mashiroiro Symphony: The Color of Lovers	Mashiroiro Symphony	2011	TV series
Mashō no Nie 3: Hakudaku no Umi ni Shizumu Injoku no Reiki	Mashō no Nie 3: Hakudaku no Umi ni Shizumu Injoku no Reiki	2016	OVA series
Mass Effect: Paragon Lost	Mass Effect	2012	Film
Master of Epic: The Animation Age	Master of Epic	2007	TV series
Medabots	Medabots	1999 – 2000	TV series
Medabots Spirits	Medabots	2000 – 2001	TV series
Medical Humiliation	Ijoku	2006	OVA series
MegaMan NT Warrior	Mega Man Battle Network	2002 – 2006	TV series
Mega Man Star Force	Mega Man Star Force	2006 – 2008	TV series
Mega Man: Upon a Star	Mega Man	2002	OVA series
Meiji Tokyo Renka	Meiji Tokyo Renka	2019	TV series
MeiKing	MeiKing	1999 – 2001	OVA series
Meikoku Gakuen: Jutai-hen	Meikoku Gakuen: Jutai-hen	2017	OVA series
Meine Liebe	Meine Liebe	2004 – 2005	TV series
Meine Liebe ~Wieder~	Meine Liebe	2006	TV series
Melty Lancer: The Animation	Melty Lancer	1999 – 2000	OVA series
Meltys Quest	Meltys Quest	2020	ONA series
Memories Off	Memories Off	2001 – 2002	OVA series
Memories Off 2nd	Memories Off 2nd	2003	OVA series
Memories Off 3.5	Omoide ni Kawaru Kimi: Memories Off / Memories Off: Sorekara	2004	OVA series
Memories Off #5 Togireta Film the Animation	Memories Off #5 Togireta Film	2006	OVA film
Ménage à Twins	Futago no Haha Sei Honnō	2005	OVA series
Menhera Ayuri no Yamanai Onedari: Headphone wa Hazusenai	Menhera Ayuri no Yamanai Onedari: Headphone wa Hazusenai	2017	OVA series
Merc Storia: The Apathetic Boy and the Girl in a Bottle	Merc Storia	2018	TV series
Mesu Kyōshi 4: Kegasareta Kyōdan	Mesu Kyōshi 4: Kegasareta Kyōdan	2015 – 2020	OVA series
Mibōjin Nikki the Animation: Akogare no Ano Hito to Hitotsu Yane no Shita	Mibōjin Nikki: Akogare no Ano Hito to Hitotsu Yane no Shita	2013	OVA film
Midnight Sleazy Train	Saishū Chikan Densha	2002 – 2003	OVA series
Midnight Sleazy Train 2	Saishū Chikan Densha 2	2004 – 2005	OVA series
Mikagura Tanteidan: Katsudō Shashin	Shin Mikagura Shōjo Tanteidan	2004	OVA series
MILF Mansion	Yakata Jukujo: The Immoral Residence	2007 – 2008	OVA series
Milkyway	Milkyway	2003	OVA series
Million Arthur	Million Arthur	2018 – 2019	TV series
Minna Atsumare! Falcom Gakuen	Ys / Trails / Dragon Slayer	2014 – 2015	TV series
Misato-chan no Yume Nikki	Misato-chan no Yume Nikki	1999	OVA film
Mizuiro	Mizuiro	2002	OVA series
Mizuiro	Mizuiro	2003	OVA series
Moegaku★5	Moegaku	2008	TV series
Moekan the Animation	Moekan	2003 – 2004	OVA series
Moeyo Ken	Moeyo Ken	2003 – 2004	OVA series
Moeyo Ken	Moeyo Ken	2005	TV series
Mofukuzuma	Mofukuzuma: Yurushite Anata... Watashi, Yowai Onna Desu	2010 – 2011	OVA series
Momiji	Momiji	2002 – 2003	OVA series
Momotarō Densetsu	Momotarō Densetsu	1989 – 1990	TV series
MonHun Nikki Girigiri Airū-mura Airū Kiki Ippatsu	Monster Hunter Diary	2010	TV series
MonHun Nikki Girigiri Airū-mura G	Monster Hunter Diary	2011	TV series
Monster Farm 5: Circus Caravan Original Animation – Kessei!! Orcoro Circus	Monster Rancher EVO	2005	OVA film
Monster Girl Quest	Monster Girl Quest	2017	ONA series
Monster Hunter Stories: Ride On	Monster Hunter Stories	2016 – 2018	TV series
Monster Rancher	Monster Rancher	1999 – 2000	TV series
Monster Sonic! D'Artagnyan's Rise to Fame	Monster Strike	2017	ONA series
Monster Strike	Monster Strike	2015 – 2016	ONA series
Monster Strike 2nd Season	Monster Strike	2017	ONA series
Monster Strike the Animation	Monster Strike	2018 – 2019	ONA series
Monster Strike The Movie	Monster Strike	2016	Film
Monster Strike the Movie: Lucifer - Zetsubō no Yoake	Monster Strike	2020	Film
Monster Strike the Movie: Sora no Kanata	Monster Strike	2018	Film
Monster Strike: Deadverse Reloaded	Monster Strike	2025	TV series
Monster Strike: An Encore and Continuance – Pandora's Box	Monster Strike	2016	ONA film
Monster Strike: The Fading Cosmos	Monster Strike	2017 – 2018	ONA series
Monster Strike: A Rhapsody Called Lucy -The Very First Song-	Monster Strike	2017	ONA film
Monster Strike: Mermaid Rhapsody	Monster Strike	2016	ONA film
Monster Strike: Rain of Memories	Monster Strike	2016	ONA film
Moonlight Lady	Moonlight Lady	2001 – 2004	OVA series
Moonlight Sonata	Moonlight Sonata	2001	OVA film
Mōryō no Nie	Mōryō no Nie	2012 – 2013	OVA series
Mother In Love	Tsuma no Haha Sayuri	2011 – 2012	OVA series
Mr Love: Queen's Choice	Mr Love: Queen's Choice	2020	TV series
Muma no Machi Cornelica	Muma no Machi Cornelica	2018 – 2019	OVA series
Mune Kyun! Heartful Cafe	Mune Kyun! Heartful Cafe	2002	OVA series
Mushiking: The King of Beetles	Mushiking: The King of Beetles	2005 – 2006	TV series
Mushiking: The King of Beetles – The Road to the Greatest Champion	Mushiking: The King of Beetles	2005	Film
Mushiking: The King of Beetles Super Battle Movie – The Upgraded Armored Beetle of Darkness	Mushiking: The King of Beetles	2007	Film
Muv-Luv Alternative	Muv-Luv Alternative	2021 – 2022	TV series
Muv-Luv Alternative: Total Eclipse	Muv-Luv Alternative	2012	TV series
My Brother's Wife	Aniyome	2004 – 2005	OVA series
My Classmate's Mother	My Classmate's Mother	2007	OVA series
My Life as a Cult Leader	My Life as a Cult Leader	2020	OVA series
Myself ; Yourself	Myself ; Yourself	2007	TV series
Mysteria Friends	Rage of Bahamut	2019	TV series
Mystery of the Necronomicon	Kuro no Danshō: The Literary Fragment	1999 – 2000	OVA series
The Mystery of Nonomura Hospital	The Mystery of Nonomura Hospital	1996 – 1997	OVA series
Naedoko Demon's Ground the Animation	Naedoko Demon's Ground	2019	ONA film
Nakoruru: Ano Hito kara no Okurimono	Nakoruru: Ano Hito kara no Okurimono	2002	OVA film
Namaiki: Kissuisō e Yōkoso! The Animation	Namaiki: Kissuisō e Yōkoso!	2015	OVA film
Nameko-ke no Ichizoku	Mushroom Garden	2013 – 2014	OVA series
Nameko: Sekai no Tomodachi	Mushroom Garden	2016 – 2017	TV series
Namu Amida Butsu! Rendai Utena	Namu Amida Butsu! Rendai Utena	2019	TV series
Nanatsuiro Drops	Nanatsuiro Drops	2007	TV series
Nariyuki: Papakatsu Girls!! The Animation	Nariyuki: Papakatsu Girls!!	2018	OVA series
Natsuiro no Sunadokei	Hourglass of Summer	2004	OVA series
Natsuyasumi Ake no Kanojo wa...	Natsuyasumi Ake no Kanojo wa...	2022	OVA series
Natural Obsessions 2	Natural 2: Duo	2001 – 2003	OVA series
Natural Vacation the Animation	Natural Vacation	2018	OVA film
Necromancer	Shimai Ningyō	2006	OVA film
Nee Summer!	Nee Summer!	2011 – 2012	OVA series
Nee, Chanto Shiyō yo!	Nee, Chanto Shiyō yo!	2005 – 2007	OVA series
Needy Streamer Overload	Needy Streamer Overload	2026	TV series
Neko no Nyahho: Nya Miseraburu	Cats Atelier	2019	TV series
Nekopara	Nekopara	2017	OVA film
Nekopara	Nekopara	2020	TV series
Nekopara: Koneko no Hi no Yakusoku	Nekopara	2018	OVA film
Neo Angelique Abyss	Angelique	2008	TV series
Neo Angelique Abyss -Second Age-	Angelique	2008	TV series
Nier: Automata Ver1.1a	Nier: Automata	2023 – 2024	TV series
Night Shift Nurse: Ren Nanase	Night Shift Nurse: Ren Nanase	2005	OVA film
Night Shift Nurse: Yagami Yu	Night Shift Nurses 3	2006	OVA film
Night Shift Nurses	Night Shift Nurses	2000 – 2004	OVA series
Night Shift Nurses 2	Night Shift Nurses 2	2004 – 2006	OVA series
Night Shift Nurses: Experiment	Night Shift Nurses 3	2005 – 2006	OVA series
Night Shift Nurses: Kazama Mana	Night Shift Nurses 2	2006	OVA film
Night Shift Nurses: Kranke	Night Shift Nurses	2005	OVA series
Night Tail	Night Tail	2023	OVA series
Night Warriors: Darkstalkers' Revenge	Darkstalkers	1997 – 1998	OVA series
Nightmare × Deathscythe: Hangyaku no Resonance	Nightmare × Deathscythe: Hangyaku no Resonance	2023	OVA series
Nightwalker: The Midnight Detective	Nightwalker: The Midnight Detective	1998	TV series
Niizuma Koyomi the Animation	Niizuma Koyomi	2018	OVA film
Niku Mesu R30: Nikuyoku ni Ochita Mesu-tachi the Animation	Niku Mesu R30: Nikuyoku ni Ochita Mesu-tachi	2014	OVA film
Nil Admirari no Tenbin	Nil Admirari no Tenbin: Teito Genwaku Kitan	2018	TV series
Ninja Box	Ninja Box	2019 – 2021	ONA series
Ninja Ryūkenden	Ninja Gaiden	1991	OVA film
Ninjala	Ninjala	2020 – 2021	ONA series
Ninjala	Ninjala	2022 – present	TV series
NiNoKuni	Ni no Kuni	2019	Film
Niplheim's Hunter: Branded Azel	Niplheim's Hunter: Branded Azel	2020	ONA series
Nora, Princess, and Stray Cat	The Princess, the Stray Cat, and Matters of the Heart	2017	TV series
Norn9	Norn9	2016	TV series
Nuki Doki! Tenshi to Akuma no Sakusei Battle	Nuki Doki! Tenshi to Akuma no Sakusei Battle	2013	OVA series
Nuki Doki! Tenshi to Akuma no Sakusei Battle – Revolution	Nuki Doki! Tenshi to Akuma no Sakusei Battle	2017	OVA series
Nukitashi the Animation	Nukitashi	2025	TV series
Nyaaaanvy	Nyaaaanvy	2024	TV series
Obey Me!	Obey Me!	2021 – 2022	ONA series
Odoriko Clinoppe	Odoriko Clinoppe	2013	TV series
Office Lover 2	Office Lover 2	2017 – 2018	ONA series
Oh! My Sex Goddess	Megachu!	2007 – 2008	OVA series
Ōjo & Onna Kishi W Do Gehin Roshutsu: Chijoku no Misemono Dorei	Ōjo & Onna Kishi W Do Gehin Roshutsu: Chijoku no Misemono Dorei	2020	OVA series
Ōkami Kakushi	Ōkami Kakushi	2010	TV series
Okusama wa Moto Yariman	Okusama wa Moto Yariman	2014 – 2015	OVA series
One: Kagayaku Kisetsu e	One: Kagayaku Kisetsu e	2001 – 2002	OVA series
One: True Stories	One: Kagayaku Kisetsu e	2003 – 2004	OVA series
Onegai AiPri	Onegai AiPri	2026 – present	TV series
Oneshota the Animation	Oneshota	2020	OVA film
Oni Chichi	Oni Chichi	2009 – 2010	OVA series
Oni Chichi: Re-birth	Oni Chichi	2011	OVA film
Oni Chichi: Re-born	Oni Chichi	2011 – 2012	OVA series
Oni Chichi: Rebuild	Oni Chichi	2013 – 2014	OVA series
Oni Chichi: Refresh	Oni Chichi	2015 – 2017	OVA series
Oni Chichi: Vacation	Oni Chichi	2016	OVA film
Oni Chichi 2	Oni Chichi 2	2010	OVA series
Oni Chichi 2: Harvest	Oni Chichi 2	2015	OVA film
Oni Chichi 2: Revenge	Oni Chichi 2	2013 – 2014	OVA series
Onigiri	Onigiri	2016	TV series
Onii-chan, Asa made Zutto Gyutte Shite!	Onii-chan, Asa made Zutto Gyutte Shite!	2020 – 2021	OVA series
Onimusha	Onimusha	2023	ONA series
Onimusha: Dawn of Dreams	Onimusha: Dawn of Dreams	2006	OVA film
Onna Kyōshi Nijūsan-sai	Onna Kyōshi Nijūsan-sai	2003	OVA series
Onna Kyōshi: Nikutai Jugyō	Onna Kyōshi: Nikutai Jugyō	2004	OVA series
Oppai Gakuen Marching Band-bu!	Oppai Gakuen Marching Band-bu!	2014	OVA film
Oppai Heart: Kanojo wa Kedamono Hatsujōki!?	Oppai Heart: Kanojo wa Kedamono Hatsujōki!?	2011 – 2012	OVA series
Ore wa Kanojo o Shinjiteru!	Ore wa Kanojo o Shinjiteru!	2011	OVA film
Oreca Battle	Monster Retsuden Oreca Battle	2014 – 2015	TV series
Oshaburi Announcer	Oshaburi Announcer	2014	OVA film
Oshioki: Discipline Curriculum	Oshioki: Gakuen Reijō Kōsei Keikaku	2011 – 2012	OVA series
Otaku no Seiza: An Adventure in the Otaku Galaxy	Otaku no Seiza: An Adventure in the Otaku Galaxy	1994	OVA series
Otoboku: Maidens Are Falling For Me!	Otome wa Boku ni Koishiteru	2006	TV series
Otome * Domain the Animation	Otome * Domain	2017	OVA film
Otome Chibaku Yūgi	Otome Chibaku Yūgi: Disgrace Return Play	2010	OVA series
Otome Jūrin Yūgi: Maiden Infringement Play	Otome Jūrin Yūgi: Maiden Infringement Play	2010	OVA series
Otome wa Boku ni Koishiteru: Futari no Elder the Animation	Otome wa Boku ni Koishiteru: Futari no Elder	2012	OVA series
Otome wa Boku ni Koishiteru: Trinkle Stars the Animation	Otome wa Boku ni Koishiteru: Trinkle Stars	2022	OVA film
Otome wa Boku ni Koishiteru: Trinkle Stars the Animation	Otome wa Boku ni Koishiteru: Trinkle Stars	2022	OVA series
Oyako Rankan the Animation	Oyako Rankan	2013	OVA film
Ozmafia!!	Ozmafia!!	2016	TV series
Pac-Man and the Ghostly Adventures	Pac-Man	2013 – 2015	TV series
Paid & Laid	Shakkin Shimai	2007 – 2008	OVA series
Paizuri Cheerleader vs. Sakunyū Ōendan!	Paizuri Cheerleader vs. Sakunyū Ōendan!	2014	OVA film
Pakomane: Watashi, Kyō kara Meimon Yakyūbu no Seishorigakari ni Narimasu... The Animation	Pakomane: Watashi, Kyō kara Meimon Yakyūbu no Seishorigakari ni Narimasu...	2017	OVA film
Panzer Dragoon	Panzer Dragoon	1996	OVA film
Papa Love: Papa to Icha Ero Shitai Musume-tachi to Hitotsu Yane no Shita de	Papa Love: Papa to Icha Ero Shitai Musume-tachi to Hitotsu Yane no Shita de	2012 – 2013	OVA series
PaRappa the Rapper	PaRappa the Rapper	2001 – 2002	TV series
Pastel Memories	Pastel Memories	2019	TV series
The Patients of Dr. Maro	Maro no Kanja wa Gatenkei	2015	OVA series
Peach Command Shin Momotarō Densetsu	Momotarō Densetsu	1990 – 1991	TV series
Persona 3 The Movie: #1 Spring of Birth	Persona 3	2013	Film
Persona 3 The Movie: #2 Midsummer Knight's Dream	Persona 3	2014	Film
Persona 3 The Movie: #3 Falling Down	Persona 3	2015	Film
Persona 3 The Movie: #4 Winter of Rebirth	Persona 3	2016	Film
Persona 4: The Animation	Persona 4	2011 – 2012	TV series
Persona 4: The Animation -The Factor of Hope-	Persona 4	2012	Film
Persona 4: The Golden Animation	Persona 4 Golden	2014	TV series
Persona 5: The Animation	Persona 5	2018	TV series
Persona: Trinity Soul	Persona 3	2008	TV series
Perverse Investigations	Seisai: Hakudaku no Misogi	2003	OVA series
Perverted Thomas	Perverted Thomas	2004	OVA film
Petit SEKAI	Hatsune Miku: Colorful Stage!	2022	ONA series
Petite Princess Yucie	Princess Maker	2002 – 2003	TV series
Phantasy Star Online 2: The Animation	Phantasy Star Online 2	2016	TV series
Phantasy Star Online 2: Episode Oracle	Phantasy Star Online 2	2019 – 2020	TV series
Phantom of the Kill: Zero kara no Hangyaku	Phantom of the Kill	2016	Film
Phantom: The Animation	Phantom of Inferno	2004	OVA series
Phantom: Requiem for the Phantom	Phantom of Inferno	2009	TV series
Photo Kano	Photo Kano	2013	TV series
Pigeon Blood	Pigeon Blood	2003 – 2004	OVA series
Pikmin Short Movies	Pikmin	2014	Film
Planetarian: The Reverie of a Little Planet	Planetarian: The Reverie of a Little Planet	2016	ONA series
Planetarian: Snow Globe	Planetarian: The Reverie of a Little Planet	2021	OVA film
Planetarian: Storyteller of the Stars	Planetarian: The Reverie of a Little Planet	2016	Film
Please Rape Me!	Please Rape Me!	2012	OVA series
Pleasure Commute	Tsūkin Kairaku: Chikan de Go!	2007	OVA film
Pokémon	Pokémon	1997 – present	TV series
Pokémon 3: The Movie	Pokémon	2000	Film
Pokémon 3D Adventure: Find Mew!	Pokémon	2005	Film
Pokémon 4D: Pikachu's Ocean Adventure	Pokémon	2006	Film
Pokémon 4Ever	Pokémon	2001	Film
Pokémon Chronicles	Pokémon	2002 – 2004	TV series
Pokémon Concierge	Pokémon	2023 – 2025	ONA series
Pokémon Evolutions	Pokémon	2021	ONA series
Pokémon Generations	Pokémon	2016	ONA series
Pokémon Heroes	Pokémon	2002	Film
Pokémon Mystery Dungeon	Pokémon Mystery Dungeon	2006 – 2009	TV film
Pokémon Origins	Pokémon	2013	TV film
Pokémon Ranger and the Temple of the Sea	Pokémon	2006	Film
Pokémon Ranger: Guardian Signs	Pokémon Ranger: Guardian Signs	2010	TV film
Pokémon the Movie 2000	Pokémon	1999	Film
Pokémon the Movie: Black—Victini and Reshiram	Pokémon	2011	Film
Pokémon the Movie: Diancie and the Cocoon of Destruction	Pokémon	2014	Film
Pokémon the Movie: Genesect and the Legend Awakened	Pokémon	2013	Film
Pokémon the Movie: Hoopa and the Clash of Ages	Pokémon	2015	Film
Pokémon the Movie: I Choose You!	Pokémon	2017	Film
Pokémon the Movie: Kyurem vs. the Sword of Justice	Pokémon	2012	Film
Pokémon the Movie: Secrets of the Jungle	Pokémon	2020	Film
Pokémon the Movie: The Power of Us	Pokémon	2018	Film
Pokémon the Movie: Volcanion and the Mechanical Marvel	Pokémon	2016	Film
Pokémon the Movie: White—Victini and Zekrom	Pokémon	2011	Film
Pokémon—Zoroark: Master of Illusions	Pokémon	2010	Film
Pokémon: Arceus and the Jewel of Life	Pokémon	2009	Film
Pokémon: Camp Pikachu	Pokémon	2002	Film
Pokémon: Destiny Deoxys	Pokémon	2004	Film
Pokémon: Eevee & Friends	Pokémon	2013	Film
Pokémon: Giratina & the Sky Warrior	Pokémon	2008	Film
Pokémon: Gotta Dance!	Pokémon	2003	Film
Pokémon: Hisuian Snow	Pokémon	2022	ONA series
Pokémon: Jirachi, Wish Maker	Pokémon	2003	Film
Pokémon: Lucario and the Mystery of Mew	Pokémon	2005	Film
Pokémon: Meloetta's Moonlight Serenade	Pokémon	2012	Film
Pokémon: Mewtwo Returns	Pokémon	2000	TV film
Pokémon: Mewtwo Strikes Back – Evolution	Pokémon	2019	Film
Pokémon: Paldean Winds	Pokémon	2023	ONA series
Pokémon: Pikachu & Pichu	Pokémon	2000	Film
Pokémon: Pikachu and the Pokémon Music Squad	Pokémon	2015	Film
Pokémon: Pikachu, What's This Key?	Pokémon	2014	Film
Pokémon: Pikachu's Exploration Club	Pokémon	2007	Film
Pokémon: Pikachu's Ghost Carnival	Pokémon	2005	Film
Pokémon: Pikachu's Ice Adventure	Pokémon	2008	Film
Pokémon: Pikachu's Island Adventure	Pokémon	2006	Film
Pokémon: Pikachu's Pikaboo	Pokémon	2001	Film
Pokémon: Pikachu's Rescue Adventure	Pokémon	1999	Film
Pokémon: Pikachu's Sparkle Search!	Pokémon	2009	Film
Pokémon: Pikachu's Strange Wonder Adventure	Pokémon	2010	Film
Pokémon: Pikachu's Summer Bridge Story	Pokémon	2011	Film
Pokémon: Pikachu's Summer Festival	Pokémon	2004	Film
Pokémon: Pikachu's Vacation	Pokémon	1998	Film
Pokémon: Pikachu's Winter Vacation	Pokémon	1998	OVA series
Pokémon: Pikachu's Winter Vacation	Pokémon	2000	OVA series
Pokémon: Pikachu's Winter Vacation 2	Pokémon	1999	OVA series
Pokémon: Sing Meloetta – Search for the Rinka Berries	Pokémon	2012	OVA film
Pokémon: The First Movie	Pokémon	1998	Film
Pokémon: The Mastermind of Mirage Pokémon	Pokémon	2006	TV film
Pokémon: The Rise of Darkrai	Pokémon	2007	Film
Pokémon: Twilight Wings	Pokémon	2020	ONA series
Pokétoon	Pokémon	2020 – 2026	ONA series
PoPoLoCrois	Popolocrois	2003 – 2004	TV series
Popolocrois Monogatari	Popolocrois	1998 – 1999	TV series
Popotan	Popotan	2003	TV series
Power Dolls	Power Dolls	1996 – 1998	OVA series
Power Stone	Power Stone	1999	TV series
Powerful Pro Yakyū Powerful Kōkō-hen	Jikkyō Powerful Pro Yakyū	2021	ONA series
Pretty × Cation the Animation	Pretty × Cation	2016	OVA series
Pretty × Cation 2 the Animation	Pretty × Cation 2	2016 – 2017	OVA series
Pretty Rhythm: All Star Selection	Pretty Rhythm	2014	TV series
Pretty Rhythm All Star Selection: Prism Show Best Ten	Pretty Rhythm	2014	Film
Pretty Rhythm: Aurora Dream	Pretty Rhythm	2011 – 2012	TV series
Pretty Rhythm: Dear My Future	Pretty Rhythm	2012 – 2013	TV series
Pretty Rhythm: Rainbow Live	Pretty Rhythm	2013 – 2014	TV series
Prince of Stride: Alternative	Prince of Stride	2016	TV series
Princess 69	Shintaisō: Kari	2002 – 2003	OVA series
Princess 69: Midnight Gymnastics	Shintaisō: Shin	2005	OVA series
Princess Connect! Re:Dive	Princess Connect! Re:Dive	2020 – 2022	TV series
Princess Holiday	Princess Holiday	2004	OVA series
Princess Knight Angelica	Princess Knight Angelica	2008	OVA series
Princess Knight Catue	Princess Knight Catue: Ochita Ryūki Hime	2010 – 2011	OVA series
Princess Limited	Princess Limited	2012	OVA series
Princess Lover!	Princess Lover!	2009	TV series
Princess Lover!	Princess Lover!	2010	OVA series
Princess Memory	Princess Memory	2001	OVA series
Princess Minerva	Princess Minerva	1995	OVA film
PriPara	PriPara	2014 – 2017	TV series
PriPara & Kiratto Pri☆Chan: Kira Kira Memorial Live	PriPara / Kiratto Pri Chan	2018	Film
PriPara Minna no Akogare Let's Go PriPari	PriPara	2016	Film
PriPara the Movie: Everyone, Assemble! Prism Tours	PriPara	2015	Film
PriPara the Movie: Everyone Shine! Kirarin Star Live	PriPara	2017	Film
Prism Ark	Prism Ark: Prism Heart Episode 2	2007	TV series
Prism Magical: Prism Generations!	Prism Magical: Prism Generations!	2010	OVA film
Private Sessions	Tokubetsu Jugyō	2001	OVA series
Private Sessions 2	Tokubetsu Jugyō 2	2003	OVA series
Professor Layton and the Eternal Diva	Professor Layton	2009	Film
Professor Pain	Gakuen Sodom: Kyōshitsu no Mesu Dorei-tachi	1998	OVA series
Professor Shino's Classes in Seduction	Professor Shino's Classes in Seduction	2004	OVA film
Project Boobs	Kangoku: Injoku no Jikkentō	2006	OVA series
Promise of Wizard	Promise of Wizard	2025	TV series
Psychic Force	Psychic Force	1998	OVA series
Puchimas! Petit Idolmaster	The Idolmaster	2013	ONA series
Puchimas!! Petit Petit Idolmaster	The Idolmaster	2014	ONA series
Punishment	Korashime: Kyōikuteki Shidō	2001	OVA series
Pure Love	Rhythm: Koi no Ritsudō	1998 – 1999	OVA series
Pure Mail	Pure Mail	2001	OVA series
Puzzle & Dragons	Puzzle & Dragons	2018 – present	TV series
Puzzle & Dragons X	Puzzle & Dragons	2016 – 2018	TV series
Quiz Magic Academy: The Original Animation	Quiz Magic Academy	2008	OVA film
Quiz Magic Academy: The Original Animation 2	Quiz Magic Academy	2010	OVA film
Rage of Bahamut: Genesis	Rage of Bahamut	2014	TV series
Rage of Bahamut: Virgin Soul	Rage of Bahamut	2017	TV series
Ragnarok the Animation	Ragnarok Online	2004	TV series
Ragnastrike Angels	Ragnastrike Angels	2016	TV series
Rail Romanesque	Maitetsu	2020	TV series
Rail Romanesque 2	Maitetsu	2023	TV series
Rakuen Shinshoku: Island of the Dead	Shokusai no Shima: Island of the Dead	2023 – 2025	OVA series
Ran→Sem: Hakudaku Delmo Tsuma no Miira Tori	Ran→Sem: Hakudaku Delmo Tsuma no Miira Tori	2011	OVA series
Rance 01: Hikari wo Motomete the Animation	Rance 01: Quest for Hikari	2014 – 2016	OVA series
Rance: Sabaku no Guardian	Rance	1993	OVA series
Rape! Rape! Rape!	Rape! Rape! Rape!	2008 – 2009	OVA series
Rasen Kairō	Rasen Kairō	2002	OVA series
Rasen Sokō no Dystopia	Rasen Sokō no Dystopia	2015	OVA series
Real Eroge Situation! The Animation	Real Eroge Situation!	2018	OVA series
Real Eroge Situation! 2 The Animation	Real Eroge Situation! 2	2021	OVA series
Rebirth Moon Divergence	Rebirth Moon	2005	OVA film
Refrain Blue	Refrain Blue	2000	OVA series
Rei Zero	Tokumu Sōsakan Rei & Fuko: Juseigai no Kichiku Chōkyō	2010 – 2011	OVA series
Reijō Caster: Ingyaku no Wana	Reijō Caster Mariko	2003	OVA film
Renai Kōhosei: Starlight Scramble	Renai Kōhosei: Starlight Scramble	1998 – 1999	OVA series
Rensa Byōtō	Rensa Byōtō	2007	OVA series
Resident Evil: Damnation	Resident Evil	2012	Film
Resident Evil: Death Island	Resident Evil	2023	Film
Resident Evil: Degeneration	Resident Evil	2008	Film
Resident Evil: Infinite Darkness	Resident Evil	2021	ONA series
Resident Evil: Vendetta	Resident Evil	2017	Film
Resort Boin	Resort Boin	2007 – 2009	OVA series
Reunion	Reunion: 3 Kakan dake no Puchi Dōsei	2011	OVA series
Rewrite	Rewrite	2016 – 2017	TV series
Ride of the Valkyrie	Ikusa Otome Valkyrie: Anata ni Subete o Sasagemasu	2004 – 2005	OVA series
Rin × Sen + Ran→Sem: Cross Mix	Ran→Sem: Hakudaku Delmo Tsuma no Miira Tori / Rin × Sen: Hakudaku Onna Kyōshi to Yarōdomo	2013	OVA series
Rin × Sen: Hakudaku Onna Kyōshi to Yarōdomo	Rin × Sen: Hakudaku Onna Kyōshi to Yarōdomo	2010	OVA series
Ringetsu the Animation	Ringetsu	2006	OVA series
Rinkan Club	Rinkan Club	2011 – 2014	OVA series
Rinkan Gakuen	Rinkan Gakuen	2005	OVA film
Rio: Rainbow Gate!	Rio	2011	TV series
Robotics;Notes	Robotics;Notes	2012 – 2013	TV series
Rockman.EXE: Hikari to Yami no Program	Mega Man Battle Network	2005	Film
Romance is in the Flash of the Sword II	Romance is in the Flash of the Sword II	2001 – 2002	OVA series
Roshutsu-kei Mahō Joshi Daisei Christhea	Roshutsu-kei Mahō Joshi Daisei Christhea	2022 – 2023	OVA series
Rumbling Hearts	Kimi ga Nozomu Eien	2003 – 2004	TV series
Rune's Pharmacy	Rune's Pharmacy	2018 – 2019	ONA series
Running Boy: Star Soldier no Himitsu	Star Soldier	1986	Film
Rxxx: Prescription for Pain	Ingoku Byōtō: Himerareta Wana	2002	OVA series
Ryō Seibai!: Gakuen Bishōjo Seisai Hiroku	Ryō Seibai!: Gakuen Bishōjo Seisai Hiroku	2013	OVA series
Ryōjoku Famiresu Chōkyō Menu	Ryōjoku Famiresu Chōkyō Menu	2010	OVA series
Ryōjoku Guerrilla Kari 3	Ryōjoku Guerrilla Kari 3	2008	OVA series
Ryūdōji Shimon no Inbō	Ryūdōji Shimon no Inbō	2017 – 2018	OVA series
Ryūsei Tenshi Primaveil	Ryūsei Tenshi Primaveil	2006	OVA film
Sailor Fuku Shinryō Tsumaka	Sailor Fuku Shinryō Tsumaka	2011	OVA series
Saimin Class: Joshi Zen'in, Shiranai Uchi ni Ninshin Shitemashita	Saimin Class: Joshi Zen'in, Shiranai Uchi ni Ninshin Shitemashita	2016 – 2017	OVA series
Saimin Ryōjoku Gakuen	Saimin Ryōjoku Gakuen	2008 – 2009	OVA series
Saiminjutsu the Animation 2nd	Saiminjutsu 2	2008 – 2009	OVA series
Saishū Chikan Densha Next	Saishū Chikan Densha 3	2012	OVA series
Saishū Shiken Kujira	Saishū Shiken Kujira	2007	ONA series
Sakuna: Of Rice and Ruin	Sakuna: Of Rice and Ruin	2024	TV series
Sakura Kakumei: Hana Saku Otome-tachi	Sakura Kakumei: Hana Saku Otome-tachi	2020	ONA film
Sakura no Mori	Sakura no Mori	1999	OVA series
Sakura Wars	Sakura Wars	2000	TV series
Sakura Wars: Ecole de Paris	Sakura Wars	2003	OVA series
Sakura Wars: Le Nouveau Paris	Sakura Wars	2004 – 2005	OVA series
Sakura Wars: New York NY.	Sakura Wars	2007	OVA series
Sakura Wars: Sumire	Sakura Wars	2002	OVA film
Sakura Wars: The Animation	Sakura Wars	2020	TV series
Sakura Wars: The Gorgeous Blooming Cherry Blossoms	Sakura Wars	1997 – 1998	OVA series
Sakura Wars: The Movie	Sakura Wars	2001	Film
Sakura Wars: The Radiant Gorgeous Blooming Cherry Blossoms	Sakura Wars	1999 – 2000	OVA series
Salamander	Salamander	1988 – 1989	OVA series
Samayō Midara na Lunatics	Samayō Midara na Lunatics: Tsuki no Hime Otogizōshi	2009	OVA series
Samurai: Hunt for the Sword	Kaitōranma Miyabi	1999	OVA series
Samurai Jam -Bakumatsu Rock-	Bakumatsu Rock	2014	TV series
Samurai Shodown: The Motion Picture	Samurai Shodown	1994	TV film
Samurai Spirits 2: Asura Zanmaeden	Samurai Shodown 64: Warriors Rage	1999	OVA series
Samurai Warriors	Samurai Warriors 4	2015	TV series
Samurai Warriors: Legend of the Sanada	Samurai Warriors 4	2014	TV film
Sands of Destruction	Sands of Destruction	2008	TV series
Sansha Mendan: Rensa Suru Chijoku Chōkyō no Gakuen	Sansha Mendan: Rensa Suru Chijoku Chōkyō no Gakuen	2019 – 2020	OVA series
Saru Get You -On Air-	Ape Escape	2006	TV series
Saru Get You -On Air- 2nd	Ape Escape	2006 – 2007	TV series
Scared Rider Xechs	Scared Rider Xechs	2016	TV series
Scarlet Nexus	Scarlet Nexus	2021	TV series
School Days	School Days	2007	TV series
School Days: Magical Heart Kokoro-chan	School Days	2008	OVA film
School Days: Valentine Days	School Days	2008	OVA film
Schoolgirl Strikers: Animation Channel	Schoolgirl Strikers	2017	TV series
Schwarzesmarken	Muv-Luv	2016	TV series
Secret Desires	Mi・da・ra	2002	OVA series
SeeIn AO	SeeIn AO	2001	OVA series
Sei Dorei Gakuen 2	Sei Dorei Gakuen 2	2022	OVA series
Sei Shōjo the Animation	Sei Shōjo: Seido Ikusei Gakuen	2014	OVA film
Sei Yariman Gakuen Enkō Nikki the Animation	Sei Yariman Gakuen Enkō Nikki	2013	OVA film
Sei Yariman Sisters Pakopako Nikki the Animation	Sei Yariman Sisters Pakopako Nikki	2015	OVA film
Seiso de Majime na Kanojo ga, Saikyō Yaricir ni Kanyū Saretara...? The Animation	Seiso de Majime na Kanojo ga, Saikyō Yaricir ni Kanyū Saretara...?	2017	OVA film
Sekiro: No Defeat	Sekiro: Shadows Die Twice	2026	TV series
Sengoku Basara: End of Judgement	Sengoku Basara	2014	TV series
Sengoku Basara: Samurai Kings	Sengoku Basara	2009	TV series
Sengoku Basara: Samurai Kings 2	Sengoku Basara	2010	TV series
Sengoku Basara: The Last Party	Sengoku Basara	2011	Film
Sengoku Collection	Sengoku Collection	2012	TV series
Sengoku Night Blood	Sengoku Night Blood	2017	TV series
Sengoku Paradise Kiwami	Sengoku Paradise	2011 – 2012	TV series
Senjō no Valkyria 3: Taga Tame no Jūsō	Valkyria Chronicles III	2011	OVA series
Senran Kagura: Estival Versus – Festival Eve Full of Swimsuits	Senran Kagura	2015	OVA film
Senran Kagura: Ninja Flash!	Senran Kagura	2013	TV series
Senran Kagura: Shinovi Master	Senran Kagura	2018	TV series
Sentimental Journey	Sentimental Graffiti	1998	TV series
Servant Princess	Elfina: Yoru e to Urareta Ōkoku de...	2003 – 2004	OVA series
Seven Knights Revolution: Hero Successor	Seven Knights	2021	TV series
Sex Code of the Samurai	Samurai Hormone	2014	OVA film
Sex Friend Osananajimi: Shojo to Dōtei wa Hazukashii tte Minna ga Iu kara – The Animation	Sex Friend Osananajimi: Shojo to Dōtei wa Hazukashii tte Minna ga Iu kara	2020	OVA film
Sex Hypnotist Zero	Saimin	2013	OVA series
Sex Salon	Yubisaki Annainin Shirudaku Settai Okawari Sanbaime	2010	OVA series
Sex Starved Nurses	Anata no Shiranai Kangofu: Seiteki Byōtō 24-ji	2009	OVA series
Sex Taxi	Kojin Taxi	2002 – 2004	OVA series
Sexfriend	Sexfriend	2004	OVA series
Sexorcist	Metal & Lace: The Battle of the Robo Babes	1996	OVA film
Sextra Credit	Mejoku: Fukushū Gakuen	2004 – 2005	OVA series
Sexual Conquest	Honō no Haramase Dōkyūsei	2008 – 2009	OVA series
Sexual Pursuit	Sōkan Yūgi	2007	OVA series
Sexual Pursuit Vol. 2	Sōkan Yūgi 2	2009	OVA series
Sexy Daze, Naughty Knights	Sei Brunehilde Gakuen Shōjo Kishidan to Junpaku no Panty: Kacchū Ojō-sama no Zecchō Omorashi	2014	OVA film
Sexy Magical Girl	Mahō Shōjo Ai	2003 – 2005	OVA series
Sexy Magical Girl Ai	Mahō Shōjo Ai San	2009	OVA series
Shabura Rental: Ecchi na Oneesan to no Eroero Rental Obenkyō the Animation	Shabura Rental: Ecchi na Oneesan to no Eroero Rental Obenkyō	2015	OVA film
Shachibato! President, It's Time for Battle!	Shachibato! President, It's Time for Battle!	2020	TV series
Shachiku: Kuruma no Naka de Kattemasu	Shachiku	2001	OVA film
Shadowverse	Shadowverse	2020 – 2021	TV series
Shadowverse Flame	Shadowverse	2022 – 2024	TV series
Shape of Love: Do You Hate Girls With Dirty Minds?	Shape of Love: Do You Hate Girls With Dirty Minds?	2008	OVA series
Shenmue: The Animation	Shenmue	2022	TV series
Shenmue: The Movie	Shenmue	2001	Film
Shigokare: Ecchi na Joshi Daisei to Doki x2 Love Lesson!! The Animation	Shigokare: Ecchi na Joshi Daisei to Doki x2 Love Lesson!!	2019	OVA film
Shihai no Kyōdan	Shihai no Kyōdan	2020	OVA series
Shiiku × Kanojo	Shiiku × Kanojo	2016 – 2017	OVA series
Shikkaku Ishi	Shikkaku Ishi	2003	OVA series
Shin Hitō Meguri	Shin Hitō Meguri	2013 – 2016	OVA series
Shin Koihime Musō	Koihime Musō	2009	TV series
Shin Koihime Musō: Otome Tairan	Koihime Musō	2010	TV series
Shin Kyōhaku 2 the Animation: Kizu ni Saku Hana Senketsu no Kurenai	Kyōhaku 2: Kizu ni Saku Hana Senketsu no Kurenai	2006	OVA series
Shin Megami Tensei: Devil Children	Shin Megami Tensei: Devil Children	2000 – 2001	TV series
Shin Megami Tensei: Devil Children – Light & Dark	Shin Megami Tensei: Devil Children	2002 – 2003	TV series
Shin Ringetsu	Shin Ringetsu	2008 – 2009	OVA series
Shin Ruriiro no Yuki	Shin Ruriiro no Yuki: Furimukeba Tonari ni	2000 – 2001	OVA series
Shin Sei Yariman Gakuen Enkō Nikki the Animation	Sei Yariman Gakuen Enkō Nikki	2014	OVA film
Shining Hearts: Shiawase no Pan	Shining Hearts	2012	TV series
Shining Tears X Wind	Shining Tears / Shining Wind	2007	TV series
Shinkyoku Sōkai Polyphonica	Shinkyoku Sōkai Polyphonica	2007	TV series
Shinkyoku Sōkai Polyphonica Crimson S	Shinkyoku Sōkai Polyphonica	2009	TV series
Shinobi Seduction	Mitama: Shinobi	2009	OVA series
Shinsei Futanari Idol: Dekatama-kei!	Shinsei Futanari Idol: Dekatama-kei	2016 – 2017	OVA series
Shinshō Genmukan	Shinshō Genmukan	2010	OVA series
Shiofuki Mermaid	Shiofuki Mermaid: Dame......Coach! Nanika Dechaū!	2011	OVA film
Shion	Shion: Zankoku na Mahō no Tenshi	2008 – 2010	OVA series
Shironeko Project: Zero Chronicle	White Cat Project	2020	TV series
Shitai o Arau: The Animation	Shitai o Arau	2003 – 2004	OVA series
Shōjo Kyōiku	Shōjo Kyōiku	2015	OVA series
Shōjo Kyōiku RE	Shōjo Kyōiku	2019	OVA series
Shōjo Ramune	Shōjo Ramune	2016 – 2018	OVA series
Shōjo Senki Brain Jacker	Shōjo Senki Soul Eater	2011 – 2012	OVA series
Shōjo Senki Soul Eater	Shōjo Senki Soul Eater	2010	OVA film
Shōkōjo the Animation	Shōkōjo	2011 – 2012	OVA series
Show by Rock!!	Show by Rock!!	2015	TV series
Show By Rock!! Mashumairesh!!	Show by Rock!!	2020	TV series
Show By Rock!! Short!!	Show by Rock!!	2016	TV series
Show By Rock!! Stars!!	Show by Rock!!	2021	TV series
Show by Rock!!#	Show by Rock!!	2016	TV series
Shuffle!	Shuffle!	2005 – 2006	TV series
Shuffle! Memories	Shuffle!	2007	TV series
Shujii no Inbō	Shujii no Inbō	2011	OVA series
Shukufuku no Campanella	Shukufuku no Campanella	2010	TV series
Shusaku the Letch	Shusaku	1999	OVA series
Shusaku the Letch: Liberty	Shusaku	2003	OVA series
Shusaku the Letch: Replay	Shusaku	2000 – 2001	OVA series
Sibling Secret	Unbalance	2002	OVA series
Silent Chaser Kagami	Silent Chaser Kagami	2000	OVA film
Sin Sorority	Utsukushiki Emono-tachi no Gakuen	2001 – 2002	OVA series
Sin: The Movie	Sin	2000	OVA film
Slap-up Party: Arad Senki	Dungeon Fighter Online	2009	TV series
Slave Market	Slave Market	2002	OVA series
Slave Nurses	Slave Nurses	2003	OVA series
Slave Princess Olivia	Slave Princess Olivia	2013 – 2014	OVA series
Slave Sisters	Shimai Ijiri: Chiru Hana, Nirin	1999 – 2000	OVA series
Sleepless: A Midsummer Night's Dream – The Animation	Sleepless: A Midsummer Night's Dream	2022	OVA series
Sleepless Nocturne the Animation	Sleepless Nocturne	2023	OVA series
Slutty-Princess Diaries	Kijoku: Princess Double Kari	2004	OVA series
SM no Susume	SM no Susume: The Seeker ZERO	2001	OVA film
Smile of the Arsnotoria the Animation	Smile of the Arsnotoria	2022	TV series
Soikano: Gyutto Dakishimete the Animation	Soikano: Gyutto Dakishimete	2018	OVA film
Sōkō Seiki Ysphere: Ingyaku no Sennō Kaizō	Sōkō Seiki Ysphere: Ingyaku no Sennō Kaizō	2020 – 2021	OVA series
SoniAni: Super Sonico The Animation	SoniComi: Communication with Sonico	2014	TV series
Sonic the Hedgehog: The Movie	Sonic the Hedgehog	1996	OVA series
Sonic X	Sonic the Hedgehog	2003 – 2005	TV series
Sono Hanabira ni Kuchizuke o: Anata to Koibito Tsunagi	A Kiss for the Petals: Joined in Love with You	2010	OVA film
Sora no Iro, Mizu no Iro	Sora no Iro, Mizu no Iro	2006 – 2008	OVA series
Soredemo Tsuma o Aishiteru	Soredemo Tsuma o Aishiteru	2011 – 2013	OVA series
Soredemo Tsuma o Aishiteru 2	Soredemo Tsuma o Aishiteru 2	2018 – 2019	OVA series
Sōshitsukyō	Sōshitsukyō	2004	OVA film
Soul Link	Soul Link	2006	TV series
Soul Worker: Your Destiny Awaits	SoulWorker	2016	ONA series
Spa of Love	Ryōjoku Hitozuma Onsen	2005 – 2006	OVA series
Space Pirate Sara	Space Pirate Sara	2008 – 2010	OVA series
Spectral Force	Spectral Force	1998 – 1999	OVA series
Spectral Force Chronicle Divergence	Spectral Force	2005	OVA film
Spocon!: Sportswear Complex	Spocon!: Sportswear Complex	2014	OVA series
Spotlight	Spotlight: Senbō to Yokubō no Hazama	2002	OVA series
Square of the Moon	Yoru ga Kuru! Square of the Moon	2002 – 2003	OVA series
Stand My Heroes: Piece of Truth	Stand My Heroes	2019	TV series
Stand My Heroes: Warmth of Memories	Stand My Heroes	2023	OVA film
Star Fox Zero: The Battle Begins	Star Fox Zero	2016	ONA film
Star Ocean EX	Star Ocean: The Second Story	2001	TV series
Starless: 21st Century Nymphomaniacs	Starless: Nymphomaniacs' Paradise	2012 – 2013	OVA series
Starry Sky	Starry Sky	2010 – 2011	ONA series
Steady × Study	Steady × Study	2004	OVA film
Steins;Gate	Steins;Gate	2011	TV series
Steins;Gate: The Movie − Load Region of Déjà Vu	Steins;Gate	2013	Film
Steins;Gate 0	Steins;Gate 0	2018	TV series
Step MILF	Haha Sange	2010	OVA series
Step Sister	Gibomai: Haitoku no Kyōen	2002 – 2003	OVA series
Stepmother's Sin	Stepmother's Sin	2001 – 2002	OVA series
La storia della Arcana Famiglia	La storia della Arcana Famiglia	2012	TV series
The Story of Little Monica	The Story of Little Monica	2002	OVA series
Street Fighter II: The Animated Movie	Street Fighter II	1994	Film
Street Fighter II V	Street Fighter II	1995	TV series
Street Fighter IV: The Ties That Bind	Street Fighter IV	2009	OVA film
Street Fighter Alpha: The Animation	Street Fighter Alpha	2000	OVA film
Street Fighter Alpha: Generations	Street Fighter Alpha	2005	Film
Study-A-Broad	Eisai Kyōiku	2007	OVA film
Submission Central	Dokusen	2002	OVA series
Sukisho	Sukisho	2005	TV series
_Summer	_Summer	2006 – 2007	OVA series
Summer Pockets	Summer Pockets	2025	TV series
Summer: Life in the Countryside	Summer: Life in the Countryside	2022	OVA series
Super Mario Bros.: The Great Mission to Rescue Princess Peach!	Super Mario Bros.	1986	Film
Super Mario World: Mario & Yoshi's Adventure Land	Super Mario World	1991	OVA film
Super Real Mahjong: Mahjong Battle Scramble	Super Real Mahjong	1990	OVA film
Super Real Mahjong: Miki Kasumi Shōko no Hajimemashite	Super Real Mahjong	1990	OVA film
Super Robot Wars Original Generation: The Animation	Super Robot Taisen: Original Generation 2	2005	OVA series
Super Robot Wars Original Generation: Divine Wars	Super Robot Taisen: Original Generation	2006 – 2007	TV series
Super Robot Wars Original Generation: The Inspector	Super Robot Taisen: Original Generation 2	2010 – 2011	TV series
Super Street Fighter IV	Super Street Fighter IV	2010	OVA film
Swallowtail Inn	Ryokan Shirasagi	2003 – 2004	OVA series
Taiko no Tatsujin	Taiko no Tatsujin	2005 – 2006	TV series
Taiko no Tatsujin Anime Ba-Jon!	Taiko no Tatsujin	2021 – present	ONA series
Taimanin Asagi	Taimanin Asagi	2007 – 2008	OVA series
Taimanin Asagi 2	Taimanin Asagi 2	2015	OVA series
Taimanin Asagi 3	Taimanin Asagi 3	2016 – 2017	OVA series
Taimanin Asagi: Toraware no Niku Ningyō	Taimanin Asagi 3	2020	OVA film
Taimanin Shiranui: Inyoku no Dorei Shōfu	Taimanin Yukikaze	2021	OVA film
Taimanin Yukikaze	Taimanin Yukikaze	2013 – 2016	OVA series
Taishō Mebiusline Chicchai-san	Taishō Mebiusline	2017	TV series
Tales of the Abyss	Tales of the Abyss	2008 – 2009	TV series
Tales of Crestoria: The Wake of Sin	Tales of Crestoria	2020	TV film
Tales of Eternia	Tales of Eternia	2001	TV series
Tales of Gekijō	Tales of the Heroes: Twin Brave	2012	OVA series
Tales of Homeroom	Tales	2018 – 2019	ONA series
Tales of Luminaria: The Fateful Crossroad	Tales of Luminaria	2022	ONA series
Tales of Phantasia	Tales of Phantasia	2004 – 2006	OVA series
Tales of the Rays Theater	Tales of the Rays	2018	ONA series
Tales of the Rays: Everlasting Destiny	Tales of the Rays	2019	ONA film
Tales of Symphonia the Animation	Tales of Symphonia	2007	OVA series
Tales of Symphonia the Animation: Tethe'alla Episode	Tales of Symphonia	2010 – 2011	OVA series
Tales of Symphonia the Animation: The United World Episode	Tales of Symphonia	2011 – 2012	OVA series
Tales of Vesperia: The First Strike	Tales of Vesperia	2009	Film
Tales of Zestiria: Dawn of the Shepherd	Tales of Zestiria	2014	TV film
Tales of Zestiria the X	Tales of Zestiria	2016 – 2017	TV series
Tanjō: Debut	Tanjō: Debut	1994	OVA series
Tank Knights Portriss	Fortress	2003 – 2004	TV series
Tanken Driland	Tanken Driland	2012 – 2013	TV series
Tanken Driland: Sennen no Mahō	Tanken Driland	2013 – 2014	TV series
Tasokare Hotel	Tasokare Hotel	2025	TV series
Tayutama: Kiss on my Deity	Tayutama: Kiss on my Deity	2009	TV series
Teacher's Carnal Courses	Tokubetsu Jugyō 3 SLG	2014	OVA series
Teacher's Pet	Natural: Mi mo Kokoro mo	1999 – 2000	OVA series
Teachers in Heat	Mesu Kyōshi: Injoku no Kyōshitsu	2009 – 2010	OVA series
Teakamamire no Tenshi the Animation	Teakamamire no Tenshi	2017	OVA film
Tears to Tiara	Tears to Tiara	2009	TV series
Tekken: Blood Vengeance	Tekken	2011	Film
Tekken: Bloodline	Tekken	2022	ONA series
Tekken: The Motion Picture	Tekken	1998	OVA series
Temptation	Yūwaku 2 Tsume Ato	2003	OVA series
Tenbatsu! Angel Rabbie	Magical Twirler Angel Rabbie	2004	OVA film
Tengai Makyō: Ziria Oboro-hen	Tengai Makyō	1990	OVA series
Tenioha!: Onnanoko datte Honto wa Ecchi da yo?	Tenioha!: Onnanoko datte Honto wa Ecchi da yo?	2013 – 2014	OVA series
Tenioha! 2: Limit Over – Mada Mada Ippai, Ecchi Shiyo? The Animation	Tenioha! 2: Limit Over – Mada Mada Ippai, Ecchi Shiyo?	2020	OVA film
Tenioha! 2: Nee, Motto Ecchi na Koto Ippai Shiyo? The Animation	Tenioha! 2: Nee, Motto Ecchi na Koto Ippai Shiyo?	2019	OVA film
Tenka Tōitsu Koi no Ran: Shutsujin! Saika 4-nin Shū	Samurai Love Ballad: Party	2018	ONA series
Tenkuu Danzai Skelter+Heaven	Tenkuu Danzai Skelter+Heaven	2004	OVA film
Tentacle and Witches	Tentacle and Witches	2011 – 2012	OVA series
The Thousand Noble Musketeers	The Thousand Noble Musketeers	2018	TV series
A Time to Screw	Tokineiro	2004	OVA series
To Heart	To Heart	1999	TV series
To Heart 2	To Heart 2	2005 – 2006	TV series
To Heart 2	To Heart 2	2007	OVA series
To Heart 2 AD	To Heart 2	2008	OVA series
To Heart 2 AD Next	To Heart 2	2010	OVA series
To Heart 2 AD Plus	To Heart 2	2009	OVA series
To Heart 2: Dungeon Travelers	To Heart 2: Dungeon Travelers	2012	OVA series
To Heart: Remember My Memories	To Heart	2004	TV series
Today's Menu for the Emiya Family	Fate/Stay Night	2018 – 2019	ONA series
Togainu no Chi	Togainu no Chi	2010	TV series
Tōka Gettan	Tōka Gettan	2007	TV series
Tokimeki Memorial	Tokimeki Memorial	1999	OVA series
Tokimeki Memorial 4 Original Animation: Hajimari no Finder	Tokimeki Memorial 4	2009	OVA film
Tokimeki Memorial Only Love	Tokimeki Memorial Online	2006 – 2007	TV series
Tokimeki Restaurant: Miracle 6	Tokimeki Restaurant	2018	Film
Toku Touken Ranbu: Hanamaru ~Setsugetsuka~	Touken Ranbu	2022	Film
Tokumu Sōsakan Rei & Fuko	Tokumu Sōsakan Rei & Fuko: Juseigai no Kichiku Chōkyō	2006 – 2008	OVA series
Tokyo 7th Sisters: Bokura wa Aozora ni Naru	Tokyo 7th Sisters	2021	Film
Tokyo Majin	Tokyo Majin Gakuen Denki	2007	TV series
Tōma Kishinden ONI	Oni	1995 – 1996	TV series
Toriko Hime: Hakudaku Mamire no Reijō	Toriko Hime: Hakudaku Mamire no Reijō	2011	OVA series
Toriko no Chigiri: Kazoku no Tame ni Karada o Sashidasu Ane to Imōto	Toriko no Chigiri: Kazoku no Tame ni Karada o Sashidasu Ane to Imōto	2013 – 2014	OVA series
Toriko no Kusari: Shojo-tachi wo Yogosu Midara na Kusabi	Toriko no Kusari: Shojo-tachi wo Yogosu Midara na Kusabi	2017	OVA series
Toriko no Shizuku: Natsu no Gōka Kyakusen de Kegasareru Otome-tachi	Toriko no Shizuku: Natsu no Gōka Kyakusen de Kegasareru Otome-tachi	2019	OVA series
Touken Ranbu: Hanamaru	Touken Ranbu	2016	TV series
Touken Ranbu: Hanamaru ~Makuai Kaisōroku~	Touken Ranbu	2017	Film
Tournament of the Gods	Tournament of the Gods	1997	OVA series
The Tower of Druaga: The Aegis of Uruk	The Tower of Druaga	2008	TV series
The Tower of Druaga: The Sword of Uruk	The Tower of Druaga	2009	TV series
TriAngle	High School Terra Story	1998	OVA series
Triangle Blue	Triangle Blue	2009 – 2010	OVA series
Triangle Heart: Sazanami Joshiryō	Triangle Heart 2: Sazanami Joshiryō	2000 – 2002	OVA series
Triangle Heart: Sweet Songs Forever	Triangle Heart 3: Sweet Songs Forever	2003	OVA series
Trick or Alice	Trick or Alice	2016	OVA film
Triple Sex Tribulations	Tsuma Shibori	2008	OVA series
Tristia of the Deep-Blue Sea	Tristia of the Deep-Blue Sea	2004	OVA series
Tropical Kiss	Tropical Kiss	2012 – 2014	OVA series
True Blue	True Blue	2005	OVA series
True Blue Gaiden	True Blue	2005	OVA film
True Love Story: Summer Days, and yet...	True Love Story: Summer Days, and yet...	2003 – 2004	OVA series
True Tears	True Tears	2008	TV series
Tsugō no Yoi Sex Friend?	Tsugō no Yoi Sex Friend?	2012 – 2015	OVA series
Tsugunai	Tsugunai	2022 – 2023	OVA series
Tsui no Sora	Tsui no Sora	2002	OVA film
Tsuki Kagerō	Tsuki Kagerō	2002 – 2003	OVA series
Tsuki wa Higashi ni Hi wa Nishi ni: Operation Sanctuary	Tsuki wa Higashi ni Hi wa Nishi ni: Operation Sanctuary	2004	TV series
Tsuma ga Kirei ni Natta Wake	Tsuma ga Kirei ni Natta Wake	2019	OVA series
Tsuma Netori: Ryōjoku Rinne	Tsuma Netori: Onnakyōshi no Chōkyō Nisshi	2018	OVA film
Tsuma Netori 3: Kairaku ni Ochita Injiru Kyōshi-tachi	Tsuma Netori: Onnakyōshi no Chōkyō Nisshi	2022	OVA film
Tsuma Netori Kan: Bijutsu Kyōshi no Baai	Tsuma Netori: Onnakyōshi no Chōkyō Nisshi	2023	OVA film
Tsumamigui 3 the Animation	Tsumamigui 3	2016 – 2017	OVA series
Tsun M! Gyutto Shibatte Shidōshite the Animation	Tsun M! Gyutto Shibatte Shidōshite	2018	OVA film
Tsundere Inran Shōjo Sukumi	Tsundere Inran Shōjo Sukumi	2012	OVA series
Tsuyokiss Cool×Sweet	Tsuyokiss	2006	TV series
TwinBee Paradise	TwinBee	1998 – 1999	OVA series
The Two Facials of Eve	Mashō no Kao	2004	OVA film
Uhō Renka	Uhō Renka	2012	OVA series
Umamusume: Cinderella Gray	Umamusume: Pretty Derby	2025	TV series
Umamusume: Pretty Derby	Umamusume: Pretty Derby	2018 – 2023	TV series
Umamusume: Pretty Derby – Beginning of a New Era	Umamusume: Pretty Derby	2024	Film
Umamusume: Pretty Derby – Road to the Top	Umamusume: Pretty Derby	2023	ONA series
Umamusume: Pretty Derby – Road to the Top	Umamusume: Pretty Derby	2024	Film
Umayon	Umamusume: Pretty Derby	2020	TV series
Umayuru	Umamusume: Pretty Derby	2022 – 2023	ONA series
Umayuru: Pretty Gray	Umamusume: Pretty Derby	2025	ONA series
Umineko When They Cry	Umineko When They Cry	2009	TV series
Ura Jutaijima	Jutaijima	2018	OVA series
Uta no Prince-sama: Maji Love 1000%	Uta no Prince-sama	2011	TV series
Uta no Prince-sama: Maji Love 2000%	Uta no Prince-sama	2013	TV series
Uta no Prince-sama: Maji Love Kingdom	Uta no Prince-sama	2019	Film
Uta no Prince-sama: Maji Love Legend Star	Uta no Prince-sama	2016	TV series
Uta no Prince-sama: Maji Love Revolutions	Uta no Prince-sama	2015	TV series
Uta no Prince-sama: Maji Love ST☆RISH Tours	Uta no Prince-sama	2022	Film
Uta no Prince-sama: Maji Love ST☆RISH Tours – Tabi no Hajimari	Uta no Prince-sama	2022	TV film
Uta no Prince-sama: Taboo Night XXXX	Uta no Prince-sama	2025	Film
Utawarerumono	Utawarerumono	2006	TV series
Utawarerumono	Utawarerumono	2009 – 2010	OVA series
Utawarerumono: The False Faces	Utawarerumono: Mask of Deception	2015 – 2016	TV series
Utawarerumono: Mask of Truth	Utawarerumono: Mask of Truth	2022	TV series
Utawarerumono: Tuskur-kōjo no Karei Naru Hibi	Utawarerumono	2018	OVA film
Valkyria Chronicles	Valkyria Chronicles	2009	TV series
Valkyrie Chōkyō Semen Tank no Ikusa Otome 10-nin Shimai	Valkyrie Chōkyō Semen Tank no Ikusa Otome 10-nin Shimai	2009 – 2010	OVA series
Vampire Holmes	Vampire Holmes	2015	TV series
Variable Geo	Variable Geo	1997	OVA series
Variable Geo Neo	Variable Geo Neo	2004 – 2005	OVA series
Venus Blood: Brave	Venus Blood: Brave	2018 – 2020	OVA series
Venus Project: Climax	Venus Project	2015	TV series
Viewtiful Joe	Viewtiful Joe	2004 – 2005	TV series
Viper GTS	Viper GTS	2002 – 2003	OVA series
Virgin Touch	Flutter of Birds: Tori-tachi no Habataki	2002	OVA series
Virtua Fighter	Virtua Fighter	1995 – 1996	TV series
Virtuacall	Virtuacall 2	1997	OVA series
Virus Buster Serge	Virus	1997	TV series
VitaminX Addiction	Vitamin	2011	OVA series
Voltage Fighter Gowcaizer	Voltage Fighter Gowcaizer	1996 – 1997	OVA series
Voyeur's Digest	Shokuzai no Kyōshitsu: Bad End	2002 – 2003	OVA series
W Wish	W Wish	2004	TV series
Waccha PriMagi!	Waccha PriMagi!	2021 – 2022	TV series
Wagamama High Spec	Wagamama High Spec	2016	TV series
Walkure Romanze	Walkure Romanze	2013	TV series
Wana: Hakudaku Mamire no Hōkago	Wana: Hakudaku Mamire no Hōkago	2011	OVA series
Wanna. SpartanSex Spermax!!!	Wanna. SpartanSex Spermax!!!	2013	OVA series
Watashi no Shiranai Mesu no Kao	Watashi no Shiranai Mesu no Kao	2010	OVA film
We Without Wings	We Without Wings	2011	TV series
Welcome to Japari Park	Kemono Friends	2018 – 2020	ONA series
Welcome to Pia Carrot!!	Welcome to Pia Carrot!!	1997 – 1998	OVA series
Welcome to Pia Carrot!! 2	Welcome to Pia Carrot!! 2	1998 – 1999	OVA series
Welcome to Pia Carrot!! 2 DX	Welcome to Pia Carrot!! 2	1999 – 2000	OVA series
Welcome to Pia Carrot!! -Sayaka's Love Story-	Welcome to Pia Carrot!! 3	2002	Film
Wet Summer Days	Suika	2003 – 2004	OVA series
White Album	White Album	2009	TV series
White Album 2	White Album 2	2013	TV series
White Blue	White Blue	2020 – 2021	OVA series
Wicked Lessons	Gakuen no Shuryōsha: Noroshi	2003	OVA series
Widow	Mibōjin: Numeri Au Nikuyoku to Midara ni Nureru Mitsutsubo	2004	OVA series
Wife Eater	Tsumamigui	2003	OVA series
Wife with Wife	Tsuma × Tsuma 3: Koko wa Hitozuma Market! / Tsuma × Tsuma 1.5: Koko wa Niizuma Paradise!	2005	OVA series
Wife-Swap Diaries	Hitozuma Kōkan Nikki	2009	OVA series
Wild Arms: Twilight Venom	Wild Arms	1999 – 2000	TV series
Wind of Ebenbourg	Wind of Ebenbourg	2003	OVA series
Wind: A Breath of Heart	Wind: A Breath of Heart	2002	OVA film
Wind: A Breath of Heart	Wind: A Breath of Heart	2004	OVA series
Wind: A Breath of Heart	Wind: A Breath of Heart	2004	TV series
Witch of Steel Annerose	Witch of Steel Annerose	2012 – 2014	OVA series
With You: Mitsumeteitai	With You: Mitsumeteitai	2000 – 2001	OVA series
Wizard Girl Ambitious	Wizard Girl Ambitious	2011	OVA film
Wizardry	Wizardry: Proving Grounds of the Mad Overlord	1991	OVA film
Women at Work	The Guts!	2005	OVA series
Wonder Momo	Wonder Momo	2014	ONA series
Words Worth	Words Worth	1999 – 2000	OVA series
Words Worth Gaiden	Words Worth	2002	OVA series
The World Ends with You: The Animation	The World Ends with You	2021	TV series
Xanadu Dragonslayer Densetsu	Xanadu	1988	OVA film
Xenosaga: The Animation	Xenosaga Episode I	2005	TV series
Xevious	Xevious	2002	Film
Xtra Credit	Bōgyaku Gakuen	2002	OVA series
Xuan Yuan Sword Luminary	Xuan-Yuan Sword Gaiden: The Millennial Destiny	2018	TV series
Yabai! Fukushū Yami Site	Yabai! Fukushū Yami Site	2014	OVA series
Yakata: Kannō Kitan	Yakata: Kannō Kitan	2014 – 2015	OVA series
Yami to Bōshi to Hon no Tabibito	Yami to Bōshi to Hon no Tabibito	2003	TV series
Yarichin Kateikyōshi Netori Hōkoku: Dosukebe Kyonyū Oyakodon	Yarichin Kateikyōshi Netori Hōkoku: Dosukebe Kyonyū Oyakodon	2020	OVA series
Yo-kai Watch	Yo-kai Watch	2014 – 2018	TV series
Yo-kai Watch ♪	Yo-kai Watch	2021 – 2023	TV series
Yo-kai Watch ♪ Jibanyan VS Komasan Monge Daikessen da Nyan	Yo-kai Watch	2023	Film
Yo-kai Watch ♪ Keita to Orecchi no Deiai-hen da Nyan ♪	Yo-kai Watch	2021	Film
Yo-kai Watch Shadowside	Yo-kai Watch	2018 – 2019	TV series
Yo-kai Watch Shadowside: Oni-ō no Fukkatsu	Yo-kai Watch	2017	Film
Yo-kai Watch: Enma Daiō to Itsutsu no Monogatari da Nyan!	Yo-kai Watch	2015	Film
Yo-kai Watch: Forever Friends	Yo-kai Watch	2018	Film
Yo-kai Watch: Soratobu Kujira to Double no Sekai no Daibōken da Nyan!	Yo-kai Watch	2016	Film
Yo-kai Watch: The Movie	Yo-kai Watch	2014	Film
Yo-kai Watch!	Yo-kai Watch	2019	TV series
Yo-kai Watch! Jam: Yo-kai Gakuen Y – N to no Sōgū	Yo-kai Watch	2019 – 2021	TV series
Yo-kai Watch! Jam: Yo-kai Gakuen Y – Neko wa Hero ni Nareru ka	Yo-kai Watch	2019	Film
Yoake Mae yori Ruriiro na: Crescent Love	Yoake Mae yori Ruriiro na	2006	TV series
Yobai Suru Shichinin no Harame	Yobai Suru Shichinin no Harame	2014 – 2015	OVA series
Yokorenbo: Immoral Mother	Yokorenbo: Immoral Mother	2009	OVA series
Yōkoso! Sukebe Elf no Mori e	Yōkoso! Sukebe Elf no Mori e	2018 – 2020	OVA series
Yosuga no Sora	Yosuga no Sora	2010	TV series
Yotsunoha	Yotsunoha	2008	OVA series
Your Magical Name is Rina Witch	Your Magical Name is Rina Witch	2016	OVA film
Ys	Ys I: Ancient Ys Vanished	1989 – 1991	OVA series
Ys II: Castle in the Heavens	Ys II: Ancient Ys Vanished – The Final Chapter	1992 – 1993	OVA series
Yu-no	Yu-no: A Girl Who Chants Love at the Bound of This World	1998 – 1999	OVA series
Yu-no: A Girl Who Chants Love at the Bound of This World	Yu-no: A Girl Who Chants Love at the Bound of This World	2019	TV series
Yume Kui: Tsurumiku Shiki Game Seisaku	Yume Kui: Tsurumiku Shiki Game Seisaku	2011	OVA series
Yumeria	Yumeria	2004	TV series
Z.O.E. Dolores, I	Zone of the Enders	2001	TV series
Zenonzard: The Animation	Zenonzard	2019 – 2020	ONA series
Zettai Junshu Kyōsei Kozukuri Kyokashō!!	Zettai Junshu Kyōsei Kozukuri Kyokashō!!	2012 – 2013	OVA series
Zoku Koihime	Koihime	2001 – 2002	OVA series
Zoku Ōjo & Onna Kishi W Do Gehin Roshutsu: Chijoku no Misemono Dorei	Ōjo & Onna Kishi W Do Gehin Roshutsu: Chijoku no Misemono Dorei	2021	OVA series
Zoku Touken Ranbu: Hanamaru	Touken Ranbu	2018	TV series
Zoku Tsuma Netori: Ikumi to Shizuka	Tsuma Netori: Onnakyōshi no Chōkyō Nisshi	2018	OVA film
Zone of the Enders: 2167 Idolo	Zone of the Enders	2001	OVA film

== See also ==
- List of films based on video games
- List of television series based on video games
- List of animated series based on video games
- List of video games based on anime or manga
