= Vampire Holmes =

Japanese video game and anime series

ヴァンパイアホームズ (Vuanpaia Hōmuzu)
- Genre: Mystery, Supernatural
- Video game
- Developer: Cucuri
- Genre: Mystery
- Platform: iOS, Android
- Released: JP: November 13, 2014
- Anime television series
- Directed by: Yoshinobu Sena
- Music by: Yoshinobu Sena
- Studio: studio! cucuri
- Original network: TVK, Niconico
- Original run: April 4, 2015 – June 20, 2015
- Episodes: 12

Vampire Holmes (ヴァンパイアホームズ, Vuanpaia Hōmuzu) was a Japanese smartphone game app developed by Cucuri for iOS and Android devices. The game started service on November 13, 2014. A short TV anime series premiered in Japan on TVK on April 4, 2015. The game's original creator Yoshinobu Sena voices the protagonist and writes the theme song for the anime. The theme song "Everlasting Love" is performed by Nami Tamaki.

== Premise ==
The story of the original game takes place in London shrouded in night, where "Vampire Slasher" incidents have been happening in the streets. The player must work with Holmes, a detective who does not explain mysteries and does not use reasoning skills, to investigate a suspicious mansion and learn the truth.

The anime series features Holmes as the protagonist. He is a private detective who does not reason, or not even explain mysteries. However, he always solves the cases requested. He secretly undertakes a mission from the Metropolitan Police of London to search for vampires.

== Characters ==
Holmes (ホームズ, Hōmuzu)
Voiced by: Yoshinobu Sena
A private detective, but against his name, he does not explain mysteries and does not use reasoning skills. He secretly undertakes a mission from the Metropolitan Police of London to search for vampires.
Hudson (ハドソン, Hadoson)
Voiced by: Nobunaga Shimazaki
Holmes's young assistant.
Kira (キラ)
Voiced by: Ayahi Takagaki
Holmes' house cat.
Christina (クリスティーナ, Kurisutīna)
Voiced by: Ayahi Takagaki
The landlord of the house where Holmes lives.
