= Saishū Shiken Kujira =

Japanese visual novel

最終試験くじら (Saishū Shiken Kujira)
- Video game
- Developer: Circus
- Publisher: Circus (Windows); Sweets (PS2)
- Genre: Eroge, Visual novel
- Platform: Windows, PlayStation 2
- Released: December 23, 2004 (DVD-ROM)
- Original net animation
- Directed by: Nagisa Miyazaki; Supervision: Hiroshi Kushiro; C Suzuki
- Produced by: Gō Shukuri; Shigeru Saitō; Yōhei Kitō
- Written by: Nagisa Miyazaki
- Music by: Yoshiki Minami; Denkishiki Karen Ongaku Shūdan
- Studio: Zexcs
- Licensed by: NA: Media Blasters
- Released: August 25, 2007 – November 10, 2007
- Runtime: 5 minutes
- Episodes: 12

Saishū Shiken Kujira (最終試験くじら; "Final Examination Whale") is a Japanese visual novel developed by Circus and was first released on December 23, 2004. An all-ages version, Saishū Shiken Kujira: Alive (最終試験くじら Alive), followed on September 27, 2007, for the PlayStation 2. In 2007 the game was adapted by studio Zexcs as an original net animation (ONA) series.

== Gameplay ==
Saishu Shiken Kujira's gameplay requires little interaction from the player as most of the game's duration is spent reading the text that appears on the game screen, which represents either dialogue between the various characters or the inner thoughts of the protagonist. After progressing through the text, the player will come to a "decision point" where he or she must choose from multiple options. The time between these decision points varies. Gameplay pauses at these points and depending on which choice the player makes, the plot will progress in a specific direction. With the consumer ports, if an undesired choice was selected, there would be an option to rewind the story to correct the mistake. However, if the player reaches a bad end to a storyline, the player does not have this option and must reload the game at the last saved point.

== Plot ==
Riku is a stage actor, traveling around frequently. One day, he comes to a small town and gets involved in a mysterious world as if led by fate. Strange and sad memories. This town was that strange world where the whale floats in the sky. He has to take the "final test" to solve the world's mysteries.
