= Master of Epic =

- Developers: Konami, Gonzo Rosso Online
- Platform: PC
- Release: JP: April 1, 2005
- Genre: MMORPG
- Mode: Massively Multiplayer

Master of Epic is a free Japanese MMORPG. It has not been released outside of Japan. It was adapted into an anime (Master of Epic: The Animation Age) by Gonzo and Palm Studio, and aired on TV Tokyo in 2007. Master of Epic does not have levels, and instead the player has a range of skills, such as strength, clubs, magics, and business, which level up through use. Titles are earned when certain skills or combinations of skills reach certain ranks. Players are able to select between four races for player characters, and can play the game in four separate historical periods, known as Ages.

== Story ==
The game is set in Diaros, a mysterious land of legends. One of the legends is of the Noah Stone, which is said to bring prosperity to any nation which possesses it, and has therefore been the source of much conflict. A vision calling herself Irmina appears to all inhabitants of the world, warning them that they will soon enter an age of darkness. A group of adventurers are led by Irmina to Diaros, where they become acquainted with its past and future.

Thirteen million years ago, on Diaros, the High Civilization of the Mora Clan flourished thanks to the Noah Stone. However, other groups seeking the stone began persecuting the Mora Clan, and they were forced to relinquish control of the Noah Stone.

In the Present Age, there are three powers present in Diaros: Elgadin, country of the Dragon Knights who value law and order; Bisque, a country where according to the Lal Fac Faith, various clans are given the autonomy to regulate themselves; and Sasool, a country where therianthropy plays a leading role. These countries vie for control of the Noah Stone.

Ten years into the future, due to the ensuing events, war has erupted, the Age of Darkness predicted by Irmina. The war is the result of secret manoeuvers by the Mora Clan's Igo, who has put various strategies in action to take possession of the Noah Stone.

The game also takes place in the Future Age, 3,000 years after the rule of Igo, and the Chaos Age, at the beginning of everything, 45 million years ago. Players pass from one age to another, addressing a variety of obstacles, attempting to prevent the coming Age of Darkness.

== Anime ==
Master of Epic: The Animation Age is the official anime adaption of the game. The series is a comedy/parody of the game. It features short sketch comedy vignettes featuring both recurring and one-shot characters, which mock the game mechanics and the sometimes illogical rules of MMORPGs in general. Each sketch typically focuses on a specific skill featured in the game. The episodes begin with a brief host segment in which two characters explain a specific game element, (such as skills, death, or weapons) and this element then becomes a recurring theme in all the sketches of the episode. The show has a number of characters who take on various roles in different skits. The show also contains numerous inside jokes for fans of the game.
