= Akiba Girls =

Adult visual novel

アキバ系彼女 (Akiba Kei Kanojo)
- Genre: Hentai
- Video game
- Developer: G.J?
- Publisher: G.J?
- Genre: Visual novel
- Platform: Microsoft Windows, DVD player
- Released: October 24, 2003
- Original video animation
- Directed by: Shigenori Awai
- Studio: Milky; Japan-X
- Licensed by: Hustler Video, JapanAnime
- Released: June 25, 2004 – July 25, 2006
- Episodes: 3

Akiba Girls (アキバ系彼女, Akiba Kei Kanojo) is a visual novel developed by the Japanese game company G.J?. It was adapted into a 3-episode hentai original video animation series produced by Milky. It is licensed by both Hustler Video and JapanAnime in the United States. The first OVA was released on VHS and DVD simultaneously on June 25, 2004. The second was released on September 25, 2004. The third was released on June 25, 2006.

== Plot ==
Nikita Shindou has a secret that he has been hiding for a long time—he loves hentai and h-games. He enters "The Alternative Trivia Research Club" where the first of his many sexual encounters takes place. Despite that, he finds out that both of his foster sisters are in love with him, and he has to make a choice—who does he really love. Nikita loves the world of animation more than anything; he puts his life into it. He has never fallen for a real, living girl, until the day he meets Ren Aoi.

== Characters ==
- Nikita Shindou (新堂 二貴太, Shindou Nikita) is the protagonist and is a college student. He is an "akiba-addict". His parents died when he was little in a car crash and he was saved by Ren when she was an angel. He has been living with Mei ever since.
- Tamaye Akiyoshi (秋吉 珠恵, Tomae Akiyoshi) is a cosplayer and a member of the same club as Nikita. Voiced by: Junko Kusayanagi
- Hatoko Konoha (木乃葉 鳩子, Konoha Hatoko) is an older adopted sister of Nikita, which is why she has a different surname. She is drunk most of the time and seems to have feelings for Nikita, but this could be her just being drunk. Voiced by: Kaori
- Ren Aoi (蒼井 恋, Aoi Ren) Ren is an angel, who had saved Nikita from the crash which killed his parents. Since this was changing the destiny of a human, which angels are forbidden to do, Ren is punished by God to live on the Earth temporarily neither as an angel or human. By the end of the episodes, it was time for her to leave Earth, as she had served out her sentence. Voiced by: Komugi Nishida
- Mei Shindou (新堂 鳴, Shindou Mei) is the adopted little sister of Nikita. From living with Nikita for so long, she has developed feelings for him which he doesn't realise until Hatoko tells him. Voiced by: Nene
- Renka Misaki (岬 蓮香, Misaki Renka) has a tsundere personality. She is a voice actress and is also a member of the same club as Nikita. Voiced by: Renka
