= List of television series based on video games =

List of television adaptations of video games

This page is a list of television programs based on video games (both computer and console). Series adapted from novels, such as The Witcher and its spinoff The Witcher: Blood Origin, are not included.

== Animated television series ==
=== Japanese anime ===
==== Television series ====
- 9-Nine: Ruler's Crown (2025)
- 11eyes (2009)
- 18if (2017)
- 100 Sleeping Princes and the Kingdom of Dreams (2018)
- A3! (2020)
- Ace Attorney (2016–2019)
- Afterlost (2019)
- Air (2005)
- Akaneiro ni Somaru Saka (2008)
- Akiba's Trip: The Animation (2017)
- Akindo Sei no Little Peso (2017)
- Alice Gear Aegis Expansion (2023)
- Amagami SS / Amagami SS+ plus (2010–2012)
- Amnesia (2013)
- Angelique
  - Koi suru Tenshi Angelique (2006–2007)
  - Neo Angelique Abyss (2008)
- Angels of Death (2018)
- Ao Oni: The Animation (2016–2017)
- Aokana - Four Rhythms Across the Blue (2016)
- Ape Escape
  - Ape Escape (2002)
  - Saru Get You -On Air- (2006–2007)
- Arc the Lad (1999)
- Arknights (2022–2025)
- Atelier Escha & Logy: Alchemists of the Dusk Sky (2014)
- Atelier Ryza: Ever Darkness & the Secret Hideout (2023)
- Atri: My Dear Moments (2024)
- Ayakashi (2007–2008)
- Azur Lane (2019–2020)
- Azur Lane: Slow Ahead! (2021–present)
- Baboo Factory (2001–2002)
- Bakumatsu / Bakumatsu Crisis (2018–2019)
- Battle Girl High School (2017)
- Between the Sky and Sea (2018)
- Blade & Soul (2014)
- BlazBlue Alter Memory (2013)
- Blue Archive the Animation (2024)
- Blue Dragon (2007–2009)
- Blue Reflection Ray (2021)
- Bomberman B-Daman Bakugaiden (1998–1999)
- Bomberman B-Daman Bakugaiden V (1999–2000)
- Bomberman Jetters (2002–2003)
- Bungo and Alchemist: Gears of Judgement (2020)
- Caligula (2018)
- Canaan (2009)
- Canvas 2: Niji-iro no Sketch (2005–2006)
- The Case Book of Arne (2026)
- Cerberus (2016)
- Chain Chronicle: The Light of Haecceitas (2017)
- Chōsoku Henkei Gyrozetter (2012–2013)
- Cinderella Nine (2019)
- Circlet Princess (2019)
- Clannad / Clannad After Story (2007–2009)
- Code:Realize − Guardian of Rebirth (2017)
- Comic Party / Comic Party Revolution (2001–2005)
- #Compass 2.0: Combat Providence Analysis System (2025)
- Conception (2018)
- La Corda d'Oro
  - La Corda d'Oro: Primo Passo (2006–2007)
  - La Corda d'Oro: Blue Sky (2014)
- Cosmo Warrior Zero (2001)
- Cue! (2022)
- D.C. ~Da Capo~ (2003–2005)
- D.C. II ~Da Capo II~ (2007–2008)
- D.C. III ~Da Capo III~ (2013)
- Dame×Prince Anime Caravan (2018)
- Danganronpa: The Animation (2013)
  - Danganronpa 3: The End of Hope's Peak High School (2016)
- Devil May Cry (2007)
- Devil Survivor 2: The Animation (2013)
- Diabolik Lovers (2013–2015)
- Diamond Daydreams (2004)
- Dies Irae (2017)
- Digimon (1997–present)
- Digimon Adventure (2020–2021)
- Dinosaur King (2007–2008)
- Divine Gate (2016)
- Dragon Collection (2014–2015)
- Dragon Quest (1989–1991)
- Dragon Quest: The Adventure of Dai (1991–1992)
- Dragon Quest: The Adventure of Dai (2020–2022)
- DRAMAtical Murder (2014)
- Dynamic Chord (2017)
- Ef: A Tale of Memories / Ef: A Tale of Melodies (2007–2008)
- Ensemble Stars! (2019)
- F-Zero: GP Legend (2003–2004)
- Fantasia Sango: Realm of Legends (2022)
- Farmagia (2025)
- Fate
  - Fate/Stay Night (2006)
  - Fate/Zero (2011–2012)
  - Fate/kaleid liner Prisma Illya (2013–2016)
  - Fate/Stay Night: Unlimited Blade Works (2014–2015)
  - Fate/Apocrypha (2017)
  - Fate/Extra Last Encore (2018)
  - Lord El-Melloi II's Case Files: Rail Zeppelin Grace note (2019)
  - Fate/Grand Order – Absolute Demonic Front: Babylonia (2019–2020)
  - Fate/Strange Fake (2024–2026)
- Final Approach (2004)
- Final Fantasy: Unlimited (2001–2002)
- Fortune Arterial: Akai Yakusoku (2010)
- The Fruit of Grisaia
  - The Fruit of Grisaia (2014)
  - The Eden of Grisaia (2015)
  - Grisaia: Phantom Trigger (2025)
- Gaist Crusher (2013–2014)
- Gakuen Handsome (2016)
- Gakuen Heaven (2006)
- Galaxy Angel (2001–2004)
- Gate Keepers (2000)
- Gift: Eternal Rainbow (2006)
- Girl Friend Beta (2014)
- Girls Beyond the Wasteland (2016)
- Girls' Frontline (2022)
- Glamorous Heroes (2017)
- Gnosia (2025–2026)
- God Eater (2015–2016)
- A Good Librarian Like a Good Shepherd (2014)
- Granblue Fantasy: The Animation (2017–2019)
- Grand Blues! (2020)
- Green Green (2003)
- Grimms Notes: The Animation (2019)
- Guilty Gear Strive: Dual Rulers (2025)
- Gungrave (2003–2004)
- Gunparade March (2003)
- Gunparade Orchestra (2005–2006)
- Gunslinger Stratos: The Animation (2015)
- H_{2}O: Footprints in the Sand (2008)
- Hagane Orchestra (2016)
- Hakuoki (2010–2012)
- Hakuoki: Otogisōshi (2016)
- Hamidashi Creative (2024)
- Happiness! (2006)
- Haruka: Beyond the Stream of Time – A Tale of the Eight Guardians (2004–2005)
- Hero Bank (2014–2015)
- Higurashi When They Cry (2006–2007)
  - Higurashi When They Cry – Gou & Sotsu (2020–2021)
- Hiiro no Kakera: The Tamayori Princess Saga (2012)
- Honey Bee in Toycomland (1986–1987)
- Hortensia Saga (2021)
- Hoshi no Shima no Nyanko (2018–2019)
- Hoshizora e Kakaru Hashi (2011)
- Hyperdimension Neptunia: The Animation (2013)
- I-Chu: Halfway Through the Idol (2021)
- Idolish7 (2018–2023)
- The Idolmaster
  - Idolmaster: Xenoglossia (2007)
  - The Idolmaster (2011)
  - The Idolmaster Cinderella Girls (2015)
  - The Idolmaster Cinderella Girls Theater (2017–2019)
  - The Idolmaster SideM (2017)
  - The Idolmaster SideM Wake Atte Mini! (2018)
  - The Idolmaster Cinderella Girls U149 (2023)
  - The Idolmaster Million Live! (2023)
  - The Idolmaster Shiny Colors (2024)
- Ikémen Sengoku: Bromances Across Time (2017)
- In Search of the Lost Future (2014)
- Inazuma Eleven
  - Inazuma Eleven (2008–2011)
  - Inazuma Eleven GO (2011–2014)
  - Inazuma Eleven: Ares (2018)
  - Inazuma Eleven: Orion no Kokuin (2018–2019)
- Ingress: The Animation (2018)
- Irodorimidori (2022)
- Island (2018)
- Ixion Saga DT (2012–2013)
- Izumo: Takeki Tsurugi no Senki (2005)
- Kaginado (2021–2022)
- Kakyūsei (1999)
- Kakyūsei 2 (2004)
- Kamigami no Asobi: Ludere Deorum (2014)
- Kanon (2002, 2006–2007)
- Kantai Collection (2015)
  - KanColle: Let's Meet at Sea (2022–2023)
- Kemono Friends (2017–2019)
- Kenka Bancho Otome: Girl Beats Boys (2017)
- Kimi ga Aruji de Shitsuji ga Ore de (2008)
- Kimi to Fit Boxing (2021)
- KimiKiss: Pure Rouge (2007–2008)
- King's Raid: Successors of the Will (2020–2021)
- Kirby: Right Back at Ya! (2001–2003)
- Kishin Houkou Demonbane (2006)
- Koihime Musō (2008–2010)
- Kono Aozora ni Yakusoku o: Yōkoso Tsugumi Ryō e (2007)
- Lamune (2005)
- Last Period: The Journey to the End of the Despair (2018)
- Layton Mystery Tanteisha: Katori no Nazotoki File (2018–2019)
- The Legend of Heroes: Trails of Cold Steel – Northern War (2023)
- Legend of Himiko (1999)
- Legend of Mana: The Teardrop Crystal (2022)
- Legend of the Mystical Ninja (1997–1998)
- Leviathan: The Last Defense (2013)
- Lilpri (2010–2012)
- Lime-iro Senkitan (2003)
  - Lime-iro Ryūkitan X (2005)
- Little Battlers Experience
  - Little Battlers eXperience (2011–2012)
  - Little Battlers eXperience W (2012–2013)
  - Little Battlers eXperience Wars (2013)
  - LBX Girls (2021)
- Little Busters! / Little Busters! Refrain (2012–2013)
- Lord of Vermilion: The Crimson King (2018)
- Love, Election and Chocolate (2012)
- Love Get Chu: Miracle Seiyū Hakusho (2006)
- Lunar Legend Tsukihime (2003)
- Magatsu Wahrheit -Zuerst- (2020)
- Magia Record: Puella Magi Madoka Magica Side Story (2020–2022)
- Magical Canan (2005)
- Magical Girl Lyrical Nanoha series (2004–2016) – Based on Triangle Hearts 3 Lyrical Toybox
- Mahjong Soul Pong (2022–2024)
- Majikoi: Oh! Samurai Girls (2011)
- Makai Senki Disgaea (2006)
- MapleStory (2007–2008)
- Marginal Prince (2006)
- Mashiroiro Symphony: The Color of Lovers (2011)
- Master of Epic: The Animation Age (2007)
- Medabots (1999–2001)
- MegaMan NT Warrior (2002–2006)
  - Mega Man Star Force (2006–2008)
- Meiji Tokyo Renka (2019)
- Meine Liebe (2004–2006)
- Merc Storia: The Apathetic Boy and the Girl in a Bottle (2018)
- Million Arthur (2018–2019)
- Minna Atsumare! Falcom Gakuen (2014–2015)
- Moegaku★5 (2008)
- Moeyo Ken (2005)
- Momotarō Densetsu (1989–1990)
  - Peach Command Shin Momotarō Densetsu (1990–1991)
- MonHun Nikki Girigiri Airū-mura Airū Kiki Ippatsu (2010–2011)
- Monster Hunter Stories: Ride On (2016–2018)
- Monster Rancher (1999–2000)
- Monster Strike: Deadverse Reloaded (2025)
- Mr Love: Queen's Choice (2020)
- Mushiking: The King of Beetles (2005–2006)
- Muv-Luv
  - Muv-Luv Alternative: Total Eclipse (2012)
  - Schwarzesmarken (2016)
  - Muv-Luv Alternative (2021–2022)
- Myself ; Yourself (2007)
- Nameko: Sekai no Tomodachi (2016–2017)
- Namu Amida Butsu! Rendai Utena (2019)
- Nanatsuiro Drops (2007)
- Needy Streamer Overload (2026)
- Neko no Nyahho (2019)
- Nekopara (2020)
- Nier: Automata Ver1.1a (2023–2024)
- Nightwalker: The Midnight Detective (1998)
- Nil Admirari no Tenbin (2018)
- Ninjala (2022–present)
- Nora, Princess, and Stray Cat (2017)
- Norn9 (2016)
- Nukitashi the Animation (2025)
- Nyaaaanvy (2024)
- Odoriko Clinoppe (2013)
- Ōkami Kakushi (2010)
- Onigiri (2016)
- Oreca Battle (2014–2015)
- Otoboku: Maidens Are Falling For Me! (2006)
- Ozmafia!! (2016)
- Pac-Man and the Ghostly Adventures (2013–2015)
- Parappa the Rapper (2001–2002)
- Pastel Memories (2019)
- Persona
  - Persona: Trinity Soul (2008) – A spin-off of Persona 3
  - Persona 4: The Animation (2011–2012)
  - Persona 4: The Golden Animation (2014)
  - Persona 5: The Animation (2018–2019)
- Phantasy Star Online 2: The Animation (2016)
- Phantasy Star Online 2: Episode Oracle (2019–2020)
- Phantom: Requiem for the Phantom (2009)
- Photo Kano (2013)
- Pokémon (1997–present)
  - Pokémon Chronicles (2002–2004)
- Popotan (2003)
- Power Stone (1999)
- Pretty Series
  - Pretty Rhythm: Aurora Dream (2011–2012)
  - Pretty Rhythm: Dear My Future (2012–2013)
  - Pretty Rhythm: Rainbow Live (2013–2014)
  - Pretty Rhythm: All Star Selection (2014)
  - PriPara (2014–2017)
  - Idol Time PriPara (2017–2018)
  - Kiratto Pri Chan (2018–2021)
  - King of Prism: Shiny Seven Stars (2019)
  - Pretty All Friends Selection (2021)
  - Waccha PriMagi! (2021–2022)
  - Himitsu no AiPri (2024–2026)
  - Onegai AiPri (2026–present)
- Princess Connect! Re:Dive (2020–2022)
- Princess Lover! (2009)
- Prism Ark (2007)
- Promise of Wizard (2025)
- Puzzle & Dragons
  - Puzzle & Dragons X (2016–2018)
  - Puzzle & Dragons (2018–present)
- Rage of Bahamut
  - Rage of Bahamut (2014–2017)
  - Mysteria Friends (2019)
- Ragnarok the Animation (2004)
- Ragnastrike Angels (2016)
- Rail Romanesque (2020–2023)
- Rewrite (2016–2017)
- Rio: Rainbow Gate! (2011)
- Rumbling Hearts (2003–2004)
- Sakuna: Of Rice and Ruin (2024)
- Sakura Wars (2000)
- Sakura Wars: The Animation (2020)
- Samurai Jam -Bakumatsu Rock- (2014)
- Samurai Warriors (2015)
- Sands of Destruction (2008)
- Scared Rider Xechs (2016)
- Scarlet Nexus (2021)
- School Days (2007)
- Schoolgirl Strikers: Animation Channel (2017)
- Science Adventure
  - Chaos;Head (2008)
  - Steins;Gate (2011)
  - Robotics;Notes (2012–2013)
  - Chaos;Child (2017)
  - Steins;Gate 0 (2018)
- Sengoku Basara
  - Sengoku Basara: Samurai Kings (2009–2010)
  - Sengoku Basara: End of Judgement (2014)
  - Gakuen Basara: Samurai High School (2018)
- Sengoku Collection (2012)
- Sengoku Night Blood (2017)
- Sengoku Paradise Kiwami (2011–2012)
- Senran Kagura (2013–2018)
- Sentimental Journey (1998)
- Seven Knights Revolution: Hero Successor (2021)
- Shachibato! President, It's Time for Battle! (2020)
- Shadowverse (2020–2021)
  - Shadowverse Flame (2022–2024)
- Shenmue: The Animation (2022)
- Shin Megami Tensei: Devil Children (2000–2001)
  - Shin Megami Tensei: Devil Children – Light & Dark (2002–2003)
- Shining
  - Shining Tears X Wind (2007)
  - Shining Hearts: Shiawase no Pan (2012)
- Shinkyoku Sōkai Polyphonica (2007)
  - Shinkyoku Sōkai Polyphonica Crimson S (2009)
- Shironeko Project: Zero Chronicle (2020)
- Show by Rock!!
  - Show by Rock!! (2015)
  - Show By Rock!! Short!! (2016)
  - Show by Rock!!# (2016)
  - Show By Rock!! Mashumairesh!! (2020)
  - Show By Rock!! Stars!! (2021)
- Shuffle! (2005–2006)
  - Shuffle! Memories (2007)
- Shukufuku no Campanella (2010)
- Slap-up Party: Arad Senki (2009)
- Smile of the Arsnotoria the Animation (2022)
- Sonic X (2003–2005)
- Soul Link (2006)
- Stand My Heroes: Piece of Truth (2019)
- Star Ocean EX (2001) – Based on Star Ocean: The Second Story
- Starry Sky (2010–2011)
- La storia della Arcana Famiglia (2012)
- Street Fighter II V (1995)
- Sukisho (2005)
- Summer Pockets (2025)
- Super Robot Wars
  - Cybuster (1999)
  - Super Robot Wars Original Generation: Divine Wars (2006–2007)
  - Super Robot Wars Original Generation: The Inspector (2010–2011)
- Taiko no Tatsujin (2005–2006)
- Taishō Mebiusline Chicchai-san (2017)
- Tales
  - Tales of Eternia: The Animation (2001)
  - Tales of the Abyss (2008–2009)
  - Tales of Zestiria the X (2016–2017)
- Tank Knights Portriss (2003–2004)
- Tanken Driland (2012–2013)
  - Tanken Driland: 1000-nen no Mahō (2013–2014)
- Tasokare Hotel (2025)
- Tayutama: Kiss on my Deity (2009)
- Tears to Tiara (2009)
- The Thousand Noble Musketeers (2018)
- To Heart (1999)
  - To Heart: Remember My Memories (2004)
  - To Heart 2 (2005)
- Togainu no Chi (2010)
- Tōka Gettan (2007)
- Tokimeki Memorial Only Love (2006–2007)
- Tokyo Majin (2007)
- Tōma Kishinden Oni (1995–1996)
- Touken Ranbu
  - Touken Ranbu: Hanamaru (2016–2018)
  - Katsugeki/Touken Ranbu (2017)
- The Tower of Druaga (2008–2009)
- True Tears (2008)
- Tsuki wa Higashi ni Hi wa Nishi ni: Operation Sanctuary (2004)
- Tsuyokiss Cool×Sweet (2006)
- Umamusume: Pretty Derby
  - Umamusume: Pretty Derby (2018–2023)
  - Umayon (2020)
  - Umamusume: Cinderella Gray (2025)
- Umineko When They Cry (2009)
- Uta no Prince-sama: Maji Love (2011–2016)
- Utawarerumono (2006)
  - Utawarerumono: The False Faces (2015–2016)
  - Utawarerumono: Mask of Truth (2022)
- Valkyria Chronicles (2009)
- Vampire Holmes (2015)
- Venus Project: Climax (2015)
- Viewtiful Joe (2004–2005)
- Virtua Fighter (1995–1996)
- Virus Buster Serge (1997)
- W Wish (2004)
- Wagamama High Spec (2016)
- Walkure Romanze (2013)
- We Without Wings (2011)
- White Album (2009)
- White Album 2 (2013)
- Wild Arms: Twilight Venom (1999–2000)
- Wind -a breath of heart- (2004)
- The World Ends with You: The Animation (2021)
- Xenosaga: The Animation (2005)
- Xuan Yuan Sword Luminary (2018)
- Yami to Bōshi to Hon no Tabibito (2003)
- Yo-kai Watch
  - Yo-kai Watch (2014–2018)
  - Yo-kai Watch Shadowside (2018–2019)
  - Yo-kai Watch! (2019)
  - Yo-kai Watch! Jam: Yo-kai Gakuen Y – N to no Sōgū (2019–2021)
  - Yo-kai Watch ♪ (2021–2023)
- Yoake Mae yori Ruriiro na: Crescent Love (2006)
- Yosuga no Sora (2010)
- Yu-no: A Girl Who Chants Love at the Bound of This World (2019)
- Yumeria (2004)
- Z.O.E. Dolores, i (2001) – Set within the Zone of the Enders universe

==== ONA series ====
- 100 Sleeping Princes and the Kingdom of Dreams: Short Stories (2017)
- Ayumayu Theater (2006–2007)
- Bonjour Sweet Love Patisserie (2014–2015)
- Brotherhood: Final Fantasy XV (2016)
- #Compass: Combat Providence Analysis System (2018–2019)
- Cyberpunk 2077
  - Cyberpunk: Edgerunners (2022)
  - Cyberpunk: Edgerunners 2 (2026)
- Disney Twisted-Wonderland: The Animation (2025–present)
- Dragon's Dogma (2020)
- Ensemble Stars!! Recollection Selection (2023–2024)
- Fate
  - Today's Menu for the Emiya Family (2018–2019)
  - Fate/Grand Order: You've Lost Ritsuka Fujimaru (2023–2025)
- Fight League: Gear Gadget Generators (2019)
- Final Examination Kujira (2007)
- Girl Friend Note (2016)
- Hatsune Miku: Colorful Stage!
  - Petit Sekai (2022)
  - Journey to Bloom (2023)
- Idol Land PriPara (2021–2024)
- Idolish7: Vibrato (2018–2019)
- Ikuze! Gen-san (2008)
- Inazuma Eleven: Outer Code (2016–2017)
- Jaku-San-Sei Million Arthur (2015–2018)
- Kētai Shōjo (2007)
- Kid Icarus: Uprising (2012)
- The King of Fighters: Another Day (2005–2006)
- Koi-ken!: Watashitachi Anime ni Nacchatta! (2012)
- LayereD Stories 0 (2017–2018)
- Lilitales (2018)
- Meltys Quest (2020)
- Monster Girl Quest (2017)
- Monster Strike (2015–2019)
- Ninja Box (2019–2020)
- Ninjala (2020–2021)
- Niplheim's Hunter: Branded Azel (2020)
- Obey Me! (2021–2022)
- Office Lover 2 (2017–2018)
- Onimusha (2023)
- Planetarian: The Reverie of a Little Planet (2016)
- Pokémon
  - Pokémon Generations (2016)
  - Pokémon: Twilight Wings (2020)
  - Pokétoon (2020–2026)
  - Pokémon Evolutions (2021)
  - Pokémon: Hisuian Snow (2022)
  - Pokémon: Paldean Winds (2023)
  - Pokémon Concierge (2023–2025)
- Powerful Pro Yakyū Powerful Kōkō-hen (2021)
- Puchimas! Petit Idolmaster (2013–2014)
- Resident Evil: Infinite Darkness (2021)
- Rune's Pharmacy (2018–2019)
- Soul Worker: Your Destiny Awaits (2016)
- Taiko no Tatsujin Anime Ba-Jon! (2021–present)
- Tales
  - Tales of HR (2018–2019)
  - Tales of the Rays Theater (2018)
  - Tales of Luminaria: The Fateful Crossroad (2022)
- Tekken: Bloodline (2022)
- Tenka Tōitsu Koi no Ran: Shutsujin! Saika 4-nin Shū (2018)
- Umamusume: Pretty Derby
  - Umayuru (2022–2023)
  - Umamusume: Pretty Derby – Road to the Top (2023)
  - Umayuru: Pretty Gray (2025)
- Welcome to Japari Park (2018–2020)
- Wonder Momo (2014)
- Zenonzard: The Animation (2020)

==== OVA series ====
- After... The Animation (2007–2008)
- Akane Maniax (2004–2005)
- Akiba Girls (2004–2006)
- Amada Anime Series: Super Mario Bros. (1989)
- Angel's Feather (2006)
- Angelique
  - Angelique: Shiroi Tsubasa no Memoire (2000)
  - Angelique: Seichi yori Ai o Komete (2001)
  - Angelique Twin Collection (2002–2003)
  - Angelique (2004–2005)
- Angels in the Court (2000–2002)
- Azur Lane Queen's Orders (2023)
- Baldr Force EXE (2006–2007)
- Battle Arena Toshinden (1996)
- Beat Angel Escalayer (2002–2003)
- Bible Black (2001–2007)
- Bondage Mansion (2000)
- Campus (2000–2001)
- Canvas: Sepia-iro no Motif (2001–2002)
- Carnival Phantasm (2011)
- Chain Chronicle: Short Animation (2014)
- Corpse Party: Tortured Souls (2013)
- Crimson Climax (2003)
- Daiakuji: The Xena Buster (2003–2005)
- Darcrows (2003–2004)
- De:vadasy (2000–2001)
- Dōkyūsei
  - End of Summer (1994–1995)
  - Dōkyūsei: Climax (1995–1996)
  - Dōkyūsei 2 (1996–1998)
  - Elf-ban Kakyūsei (1997–1998)
  - Dōkyūsei 2 Special: Sotsugyōsei (1999–2000)
  - Kakyūsei 2: Anthology (2006)
  - Kakyūsei 2: Sketchbook (2007)
  - Dōkyūsei Remake the Animation (2022–2024)
- Dragon Knight: The Wheel of Time (1998–1999)
- Dragoon (1997)
- Él (2001)
- Enzai: Falsely Accused (2004)
- Euphoria (2011–2016)
- Fate/Grand Carnival (2021)
- Final Fantasy: Legend of the Crystals (1994)
- Fire Emblem (1996)
- Galaxy Fräulein Yuna (1995)
- Galaxy Fräulein Yuna Returns (1996–1997)
- Galerians: Rion (2002)
- Gate Keepers 21 (2002–2003)
- Girl in the Shell (2010)
- Girl Next Door (2000)
- Hakuoki (2021–2022)
- Haruka: Beyond the Stream of Time
  - Harukanaru Toki no Naka de: Ajisai Yumegatari (2002–2003)
  - Harukanaru Toki no Naka de 2: Shiroki Ryū no Miko (2003–2005)
  - Harukanaru Toki no Naka de: Hachiyō Shō (2005–2006)
- Harukoi Otome: Otome no Sono de Aimashō (2008)
- Higurashi When They Cry
  - Higurashi When They Cry: Rei (2009)
  - Higurashi no Naku Koro ni Kira (2011–2012)
- Hourglass of Summer (2004)
- The Idolmaster Shiny Festa (2012)
- Imouto Paradise!
  - Imouto Paradise! (2011–2012)
  - Imouto Paradise! 2 (2013)
  - Imouto Paradise! 3 The Animation (2018)
- Interlude (2004)
- Jewel BEM Hunter Lime (1996–1997)
- Jiburiru: The Devil Angel (2004–2010)
- Kanojo × Kanojo × Kanojo (2009–2011)
- Kimi ga Nozomu Eien: Next Season (2007–2008)
- The Legend of Heroes
  - Dragon Slayer (1992)
  - The Legend of Heroes: Trails in the Sky (2011–2012)
- Magical Kanan (2000–2003)
- Maple Colors (2004–2005)
- Mega Man: Upon a Star (2002)
- MeiKing (1999–2001)
- Memories Off (2001–2002)
- Memories Off 2nd (2003)
- Memories Off 3.5 (2004)
- Mizuiro (2002)
- Mizuiro (2003)
- Moekan the Animation (2003–2004)
- Moeyo Ken (2003–2004)
- Moonlight Lady (2001–2004)
- Mystery of the Necronomicon (1999–2000)
- Nameko-ke no Ichizoku (2013–2014)
- Night Shift Nurses (2000–2006)
- Night Warriors: Darkstalkers' Revenge (1997–1998)
- One: Kagayaku Kisetsu e (2001–2002)
- One: True Stories (2003–2004)
- Otaku no Seiza: An Adventure in the Otaku Galaxy (1994)
- Otome wa Boku ni Koishiteru: Futari no Elder the Animation (2012)
- Otome wa Boku ni Koishiteru: Trinkle Stars the Animation (2022)
- Phantom: The Animation (2004)
- Power Dolls (1996–1998)
- Princess Holiday (2004)
- Princess Lover! (2010)
- Psychic Force (1998)
- Rance: Sabaku no Guardian (1993)
- Rance 01: Hikari wo Motomete the Animation (2014–2016)
- Sakura Wars
  - Sakura Wars: The Gorgeous Blooming Cherry Blossoms (1997–1998)
  - Sakura Wars: The Radiant Gorgeous Blooming Cherry Blossoms (1999–2000)
  - Sakura Wars: Ecole de Paris (2003)
  - Sakura Wars: Le Nouveau Paris (2004–2005)
  - Sakura Wars: New York NY. (2007)
- Salamander (1988–1989)
- Samurai Spirits 2: Asura Zanmaeden (1999)
- Senjō no Valkyria 3: Taga Tame no Jūsō (2011)
- Sexfriend (2004)
- Sonic the Hedgehog: The Movie (1996)
- Sora no Iro, Mizu no Iro (2006–2008)
- Stepmother's Sin (2001–2002)
- The Story of Little Monica (2002)
- _Summer (2006–2007)
- Super Robot Wars Original Generation: The Animation (2005)
- Taimanin
  - Taimanin Asagi (2007–2008)
  - The Dark Knight Ingrid (2009–2010)
  - Taimanin Yukikaze (2013–2016)
  - Taimanin Asagi 2 (2015)
  - Taimanin Asagi 3 (2016–2017)
- Tales
  - Tales of Phantasia: The Animation (2004–2006)
  - Tales of Symphonia: The Animation (2007–2012)
  - Tales of Gekijō (2011–2012)
- Tekken: The Motion Picture (1998)
- Tengai Makyō: Ziria Oboro-hen (1990)
- To Heart 2: Dungeon Travelers (2012)
- Tokimeki Memorial (1999)
- Tournament of the Gods (1997)
- Triangle Heart: Sazanami Joshiryō (2000–2002)
- Triangle Heart: Sweet Songs Forever (2003)
- Tristia of the Deep Blue Sea (2004)
- True Love Story: Summer Days, and yet... (2003–2004)
- TwinBee Paradise (1998–1999)
- Variable Geo (1996–1997)
- Variable Geo Neo (2004–2005)
- VitaminX Addiction (2011)
- Voltage Fighter Gowcaizer (1996–1997)
- Welcome to Pia Carrot (1997–1998)
- Welcome to Pia Carrot 2 (1998–1999)
- Welcome to Pia Carrot! 2 DX (1999–2000)
- Wet Summer Days (2003–2004)
- Wicked Lessons (2003)
- Wind -a breath of heart- (2004)
- Women at Work (2005)
- Words Worth (1999–2000)
  - Words Worth: Outer Story (2002)
- Yotsunoha (2008)
- Ys (1989–1993)
- Yu-no (1998–1999)

=== International ===
There have also been several one-off video game-based cartoons, including specials such as Battletoads (1992), Bubsy (1993) and Pokémon Mystery Dungeon (2006–2009).

- Adiboo Adventure (2007–2009)
- The Adventures of Hyperman (1995–1996)
- AFK Arena: Just Esperia Things (2022)
- Age of Gunslingers (2017–2020)
- Alien: Isolation – The Digital Series (2019)
- Among Us (2026)
- Angry Birds
  - Angry Birds Toons (2013–2016)
  - Piggy Tales (2014–2019)
  - Angry Birds Stella (2014–2016)
  - Angry Birds Blues (2017)
  - Angry Birds MakerSpace (2019–present)
  - Angry Birds Slingshot Stories (2020–present)
  - Angry Birds Bubble Trouble (2020–2023)
  - Angry Birds: Summer Madness (2022)
  - Angry Birds Mystery Island (2024)
- Ape Escape (2009)
- Arcane (2021–2024)
- Ark: The Animated Series (2024–present)
- Astar-eul Hyanghae Chaguchagu (2014–2015)
- Blaster's Universe (1999–2000)
- Bravoman (2013–2014)
- Captain Laserhawk: A Blood Dragon Remix (2023)
- Captain N: The Game Master (1989–1991)
- Carmen Sandiego
  - Where on Earth Is Carmen Sandiego? (1994–1999)
  - Carmen Sandiego (2019–2021)
- Castlevania
  - Castlevania (2017–2021)
  - Castlevania: Nocturne (2023–2025)
- Clash-A-Rama! (2016–2019)
- Closers: Side Blacklambs (2016–2019)
- Costume Quest (2019)
- The Cuphead Show! (2022)
- Dao & Bazzi Boomhill Adventure (2007–2008)
- Darkstalkers (1995)
- Dead Cells: Immortalis (2024)
- Devil May Cry (2025–present)
- Dofus
  - Wakfu (2008–present)
  - Dofus: The Treasures of Kerubim (2013–2014)
- Donkey Kong Country (1997–2000)
- Dota: Dragon's Blood (2021–2022)
- Double Dragon (1993–1994)
- Dragon Age: Absolution (2022)
- Dragon's Dogma (2020)
- Dragon's Lair (1984)
- Earthworm Jim (1995–1996)
- Elsword: El Lady (2016–2017)
- Fantasy Westward Journey (2014–2016)
- Flower Angel (2014–2023)
- Fruit Ninja: Frenzy Force (2017)
- Genesis (2023)
- Gift (2005)
- Golden Axe (2026)
- Hello Neighbor: Welcome to Raven Brooks (2022–present)
- Invizimals (2014–2015)
- Jurassic War (2002)
- The King of Fighters: Destiny (2017–2018)
- Koongya Koongya (2006–2007)
- The Legend of Zelda (1989)
- Legends of Dawn: The Sacred Stone (2021)
- Mappy (2013–2014)
- Marvel's Midnight Suns Prequel Shorts (2022)
- Meet the Team (2007–2012)
- Mega Man
  - Mega Man (1994–1996)
  - Mega Man: Fully Charged (2018–2019)
- Minecraft Mini Series (2017–2018)
- Mini Ninjas (2015–2019)
- Mix Master: King of Cards (2005–2006)
  - Mix Master: Final Force (2010–2011)
- Mole's World (2011–2013)
- Moorhuhn (2001)
- Mortal Kombat: Defenders of the Realm (1996)
- Mutant League (1994–1996)
- Nightmare Ned (1997)
- Ninjin (2019–2020)
- Om Nom Stories (2011–present)
- Pac-Man (1982–1983)
- Pac-Man and the Ghostly Adventures (2013–2015)
- Pat the Dog (2017–2021)
- Pole Position (1984) (Note: Despite the series itself being unrelated to the 1982 arcade game, the Pole Position title was licensed from Namco.)
- The Power Team (1990–1991)
- Rayman
  - Rayman: The Animated Series (1999–2000)
  - Rabbids Invasion (2013–2018)
- Revelation (2017–2018)
- The Running Heroes (2017–2018)
- Saturday Supercade (1983–1984)
- Secret Level (2024–present)
- Seer (2012–2023)
- Skipper & Skeeto (2001)
- Skylanders Academy (2016–2018)
- Smighties (2019)
- Sonic the Hedgehog
  - Adventures of Sonic the Hedgehog (1993)
  - Sonic the Hedgehog (1993–1994)
  - Sonic Underground (1999)
  - Sonic Boom (2014–2017)
  - Sonic Mania Adventures (2018)
  - Sonic Prime (2022–2024)
- Soul Knight Strange Tales (2022–2024)
- Splinter Cell: Deathwatch (2025–present)
- Stone Age: The Legendary Pet (2017–2018)
- Street Fighter (1995–1997)
- Subway Surfers: The Animated Series (2018–2019)
- Super Mario
  - The Super Mario Bros. Super Show! (1989)
  - The Adventures of Super Mario Bros. 3 (1990)
  - Super Mario World (1991)
- Sword and Fairy 3 (2025–2026)
- Taichi Panda (2017)
- Tak and the Power of Juju (2007–2009) - Game and television series were developed in tandem.
- Talking Tom & Friends
  - Talking Friends (2012)
  - Talking Tom Shorts (2014–present)
  - Talking Tom & Friends (2014–2021)
  - Talking Tom and Friends Minis (2016–2018)
  - Talking Tom Heroes (2019–2021)
  - Talking Tom Heroes: Suddenly Super (2025–present)
- Tomb Raider
  - Revisioned: Tomb Raider (2007)
  - Tomb Raider: The Legend of Lara Croft (2024–2025)
- Trivia Crack
  - Triviatopia (2019)
  - Trivia Quest (2022)
- Video Mods (2004–2005)
- Viva Piñata (2006–2009)
- Where's My Water?: Swampy's Underground Adventures (2012–2013)
- Wing Commander Academy (1996)
- Wooparoo Adventure (2015)

== Live-action television series ==
=== Scripted ===
Title	Seasons	Episodes	Original airing	Production company	Network(s)	Notes	Ref.
The Super Mario Bros. Super Show!	1	65	1989	Saban Productions / DIC Enterprises	Syndication	Features both live-action and animated segments	
Maniac Mansion	3	66	1990–1993	Lucasfilm Ltd. Television / Atlantis Films	YTV (Canada); The Family Channel (United States)		
Shin Megami Tensei: Devil Summoner	2	25	1997–1998		TV Tokyo		
Tōmei Shōjo Ea	1	6	1998	TV Asahi	TV Asahi		
Athena	1	12	1998	Japan Vistec	TV Tokyo		
Mortal Kombat: Conquest	1	22	1998–1999	Threshold Entertainment / New Line Television	Syndication		
Chinese Paladin	1	38	2005	Yunnan Television	CTV (Taiwan); CBG (Mainland China)		
Kētai Shōjo: Koi no Kagai Jugyō	1	12	2007		RNC		
Chinese Paladin 3	1	37	2009	Chinese Entertainment Shanghai	Taizhou Broadcasting		
Kurohyō: Ryū ga Gotoku Shinshō	1	11	2010		MBS, TBS		
The Legend of Swordsman	1	33	2011		Hubei Television		
Watashi no Host-chan: Shichinin no Host	1	24	2011–2012		TV Asahi		
Kaitō Royale	1	9	2011		TBS		
Kurohyō 2: Ryū ga Gotoku Ashura hen	1	11	2012		MBS		
Xuan-Yuan Sword: Scar of Sky	1	36	2012		Hunan Television		
Sengoku Basara Moonlight Party	1	9	2012		MBS		
Nekketsu Kōha Kunio-kun	1	13	2013		NOTTV		
Watashi no Host-chan S: Shinjin Host Owner Kiseki no Micchaku Rokka Getsu	1	26	2014		TV Asahi		
Swords of Legends	1	52	2014		Hunan Television		
Pal Inn	1	30	2015		Youku		
Hakuoki SSL: Sweet School Life	1	6	2015		Tokyo MX2		
Higurashi When They Cry	2	10	2016	BS SKY PerfecTV!	BS SKY PerfecTV!		
Chinese Paladin 5	1	45	2016	Tangren Media / Linmon Pictures	Hunan Television		
Stardom	2	24	2016–2017		iQIYI		
The Idolmaster KR	1	24	2017		SBS funE, SBS Plus, SBS MTV, Amazon Prime Video		
Stairway to Stardom	1	50	2017		Tencent Video		
Xuan-Yuan Sword: Han Cloud	1	58	2017		Dragon Television		
Swords of Legends II	1	48	2018		Youku		
Best Mistake	3	47	2019–2022		V Live, Naver TV		
Detention	1	8	2020	Outland Film Production	PTS		
Miss the Dragon	1	36	2021		Tencent Video		
Light on Me	1	16	2021		WATCHA, Viki		
Tokyo Houchi Shokudo	1	8	2021		TXN		
Sword and Fairy Inn	1	24	2021		Youku		
Hakuoki	1	10	2022		Wowow Prime		
Halo	2	17	2022–2024	Showtime Networks / 343 Industries / Amblin Television / Chapter Eleven (season 1) / One Big Picture / David Wiener (season 2)	Paramount+		
Resident Evil	1	8	2022	Amalgamated Nonsense / Constantin Television	Netflix		
Sword and Fairy 4	1	36	2024		iQIYI		
Sword and Fairy	1	36	2024		Tencent Video		
Sword and Fairy 1	1	40	2024		iQIYI, Tencent Video		
Knuckles	1	6	2024	Paramount Pictures / Sega of America / Original Film	Paramount+	Miniseries. Part of the Sonic film series	
Like a Dragon: Yakuza	1	6	2024	Amazon MGM Studios / The Fool / Wild Sheep Content / 1212 Entertainment	Amazon Prime Video		
Ongoing
Gangs of London	3	25	2020–present	Pulse Films / Sister / One More One / FendoUK / Sky Studios	Sky Atlantic (United Kingdom); AMC+ (United States)	Renewed for a fourth season	
The Last of Us	2	16	2023–present	The Mighty Mint / Word Games / PlayStation Productions / Naughty Dog / Sony Pictures Television Studios	HBO	Renewed for a third season	
Twisted Metal	2	22	2023–present	Reese Wernick Productions / Wicked Deed / Make It with Gravy / Electric Avenue / Inspire Entertainment / Artists First / PlayStation Productions / Universal Television / Sony Pictures Television Studios	Peacock	Renewed for a third season	
Fallout	2	16	2024–present	Kilter Films / Big Indie Pictures / Bethesda Game Studios / Amazon MGM Studios	Amazon Prime Video	Renewed for a third season	

=== Unscripted ===
- A*mazing (1994–1998)
- Candy Crush (2017)
- Dunia: Into a New World (2018)
- Frogger (2021)
- Where in the World Is Carmen Sandiego? (1991–1995)
- Where in Time is Carmen Sandiego? (1996–1997)
- You Don't Know Jack (2001)

=== Web series ===
- Dishonored - Tales from Dunwall (2012)
- Dragon Age: Redemption (2011)
- The Far Cry Experience (2013)
- Halo 4: Forward Unto Dawn (2012)
- Hay Day: Meet the Farmer! (2018–2022)
- Mortal Kombat: Legacy (2011–2013)
- Payday: The Web Series (2013)
- Street Fighter: Assassin's Fist (2014)
- Street Fighter: Resurrection (2016)
- Twisted Metal: Black (2008)

== Upcoming ==
=== Animated ===
- Sekiro: No Defeat (January 2027)
- Death Stranding: Isolations (2027)
- Final Fantasy IX: The Black Mages' Legacy (2028)
- Ghost of Tsushima: Legends (2028)
- Clash of Clans (TBA)
- Kingdom Hearts: The Series (TBA)
- Minecraft (TBA)

=== Live-action ===
- Assassin's Creed (TBA)
- Far Cry (TBA)
- God of War (TBA)
- Life Is Strange (TBA)
- Tomb Raider (TBA)

== In development ==
=== Animated ===
- Crash Bandicoot
- Diablo
- Earthworm Jim: Beyond the Groovy
- Gears of War
- Untitled Genshin Impact anime
- Grounded
- Hungry Shark Squad
- Hyper Light Drifter
- Mobile Legends: Bang Bang
- Untitled RuneScape series
- Untitled Sonic series
- Watch Dogs
- Wuthering Waves: Elysium

=== Live-action ===
- Baldur's Gate
- Beyond: Two Souls
- Brothers in Arms
- Child of Light
- Disco Elysium
- Untitled Final Fantasy series
- Hunt: Showdown
- Mass Effect
- My Friend Pedro
- Pacific Drive
- Persona
- A Plague Tale
- Untitled Pokémon series
- PUBG
- Skull & Bones
- Untitled Steins;Gate series
- System Shock
- Vampyr
- Wolfenstein

== See also ==
- Film and television adaptations of video games
- List of animated series based on video games
- List of anime based on video games
- List of films based on video games
