= Vanilla Series =

Japanese pornographic anime brand

The Vanilla Series is Digital Works' brand for its hentai (pornographic) anime, most of which are based on hentai video games. In North America, the series is usually released by Critical Mass, but at least three of the series have been released by other studios. Angel Blade was released by Anime 18, while Office Affairs and Co-Ed Affairs were released by Kitty Media.

== Notable works ==
Year	Title	Notes	Ref.
1999	Endless Serenade (エンドレスセレナーデ, Endoresu Seranāde)		
1999	A Heat for All Seasons (KISSより・・・)	including Summer Heat, Autumn Heat, and Winter Heat	
1999	Office Affairs (女畜)		
2000	Girl Next Door (となりのお姉さん)		
2000	Bondage Mansion (緊縛の館)		
2000	MeiKing (めい・king, Mei King)		
2000	Nightmare Campus (外道学園)		
2001–05	Angel Blade (エンジェルブレイド)		
2001	Campus (キャンパス, Kyanpasu)		
2001	I Love You (好きだよっ！)		
2001	Stepmother's Sin (義母)		
2002	Dark (堕楽)		
2002	Story of Little Monica (リトルモニカ物語, Ritoru Monika Monogatari)		
2003	Love Doll (哀・奴隷)		
2003	Hooligan (フーリガン, Fūrigan)		
2003	Private Sessions (特別授業)		
2003	Sex Ward (閉鎖病棟)		
2003	Slave Sisters (姉妹いじり)		
2003	Spotlight (スポットライト, Supottoraito)		
2004	Milk Money (乳母, Uba)		
2004	Debts of Desire (学園～恥辱の図式～)		
2004	Perverse Investigations (性裁, Seisai)		
2004	Punishment (懲らしめ)		
2004	Wicked Lessons (学園の狩猟者)		
