= Mizuiro =

Japanese visual novel

みずいろ
- Video game
- Developer: NekoNeko Soft
- Platform: Dreamcast, PlayStation 2, Windows
- Released: 2001
- Original video animation
- Directed by: Shigeki Awai
- Written by: Yu Tachibana
- Music by: Tooru Shura
- Studio: ARMS
- Released: 23 August 2002 – 6 December 2002
- Episodes: 2
- Original video animation
- Directed by: Kiyotaka Isako
- Produced by: Makoto Nakamura; Takayuki Matsunaga
- Written by: Ryōta Yamaguchi (ep. 1); Makoto Nakamura (ep. 2)
- Music by: Tatsuya Murayama
- Studio: OLM Team Iwasa
- Released: 25 April 2003 – 10 July 2003
- Runtime: 29–30 minutes
- Episodes: 2

Mizuiro (みずいろ; "light blue") is a visual novel made by NekoNeko Soft released in 2001. It has versions for four different platforms: Windows CD (3 Disc), Dreamcast, PlayStation 2, and Windows DVD-Rom.

There were two anime OVA adaptations of the game, a two-episode hentai OVA in 2002, and Mizuiro 2003, a two-episode non-hentai OVA in 2003. Both have same characters, but with somewhat different storylines.

== Characters ==
Kenji Katase (片瀬 健二, Katase Kenji)
The protagonist controlled by the player.
Yuki Katase (片瀬 雪希, Katase Yuki)
The heroine of the story. Kenji Katase's adopted little sister.
Hiyori Hayasaka (早坂 日和, Hayasaka Hiyori)
Kenji Katase's childhood friend. (In DC/PS2 version she has two different stories)
Kiyoka Onosaki (小野崎 清香, Onosaki Kiyoka)
Kenji Katase's childhood friend.
Mutsuki Shindou (進藤 むつき, Shindō Mutsuki)
Yuki's trusted friend. In her story, she is shy. In all other stories, she is very loud and humorous.
Asami Kouzu (神津 麻美, Kōdzu Asami)
A shy, but smart third year student.
Fuyuka Ishikawa (石川 冬佳, Ishikawa Fuyuka)
Kenji Katase's tutor. She is quite strict. (DC/PS2 version only)

== Game Setting ==
- Prologue: The player's character is very young, with the story beginning with the meeting of Yuki for the first time and developing a loving sibling relationship although they are not both related in blood as Yuki was adopted.
- Pre-Opening: The player makes choices to decide the story of the game, with the players character still very young. The first meeting of Hiyori occurs, who is a lost girl crying in the park. The game then presents the problems of the character that your choices led to.
- Game: The players character is in the second year of senior high in the game (grade 11). A story about a character is presented to the player depending on the choices made in the last setting. Each story has a moving or tragic situation.
- Voice: Most of the female characters you encounter have a very calm voice, though it depends on the situation.

== Reception ==
Reception

Review score
Publication	Score
Famitsu	7/10, 8/10, 7/10, 7/10 (DC)

Mizuiro was released in Japan on March 7, 2002 for the Dreamcast.

== See also ==
- Bishōjo game
- List of television shows based on video games
