= Bondage Mansion =

Japanese hentai anime

緊縛の館 ～略奪～ (Kinbaku No Tachi ~Ryakudatsu~)
- Genre: Erotica
- Original video animation
- Directed by: Norihiko Nagahama
- Studio: Digital Works
- Licensed by: NA: Critical Mass
- Released: 2000
- Episodes: 2

Bondage Mansion (Japanese: 緊縛の館 ～略奪～, Hepburn: Kinbaku No Tachi ~Ryakudatsu~) is a Japanese erotic direct-to-video anime series, which is part of the Vanilla Series.

== Reception ==
"Bondage Mansion could easily appeal to viewers from any category. However, no matter who the viewer is, that person will likely find it hard to prevent his/her eyes from rolling at the utter lameness of the forced attempt to create a deep story line and an entrancing, artistic, elevated OVA". — Bamboo Dong, Anime News Network. "The piss-poor production values keep the show from really being worthwhile to own, but it's a perfectly good renter". — Mike Toole, Hentai Jump. "For those looking for something beyond the normal hentai you see and have been waiting for something that's trying to be like Cool Devices, this is probably a good series to check out". — Chris Beveridge, Mania. "What I liked about this release was the fact that it had more of a plot than some other hentai titles". — Brian T. Burke, Mania.
