= MeiKing =

Japanese pornographic animation series

めい・King
- Genre: Erotica
- Original video animation
- Directed by: Teruaki Murakami
- Written by: Rokurota Makabe
- Music by: Masamichi Amano (credited as Yoshi)
- Studio: Digital Works
- Released: October 8, 1999 – January 12, 2001
- Runtime: 30 minutes per episode
- Episodes: 4

MeiKing (めい・King) is a four-part erotic original video animation series set in a fantasy world and is part of the Vanilla Series.

== Story ==
The story follows a young shepherd Cain Asbell who finds the fairy Elise in a cave. Elise leads Cain to a cabin where he frees Princess Charlotte from her bondage at the hands of bandits. Cain is ultimately rewarded with lordship over the realm of Norland.

== Characters ==
=== Main characters ===
- Cain Asbell is the Lord of Norland, and is responsible for keeping order and protecting the land and its people. His kindness and purity of heart has earned him many allies and confidants, which leads Norland to victory over the Lord of Tedmond, Francis. He weds the Princess and becomes King of the entire land.
- Princess Charlotte is a blonde-haired princess of the entire realm and heir to the throne of the kingdom of Phlaburg. On her 20th birthday, she is to marry the strongest Lord of the land. While Norland and Tedmond were neck-in-neck at the end, Norland ultimately becomes the strongest land, and Cain Asbell the King and the Princess' husband.
- Francis is Lord of Tedmond and Cain Asbell's main rival. Cruel and ambitious, he rules Tedmond with an iron fist and openly taunts his rival and others, but his bravado and cruelty eventually lead to his downfall. Cain's allies stop Francis and the Tedmond army and capture them.
- Chiffon is a light-haired, half-elven priestess who is appointed to Cain Asbell to be his advisor during his reign as Lord of Norland. She has a distrust of humans due to being brutally treated by them as a young child and teenager. Her cold heart soon begins to warm as Cain earns her trust. Once Cain becomes king, she returns to her church, her duties fulfilled.
- Tsubaki is a raven-haired swordswoman from the island of Yapan. She appears in Norland at the beginning of Cain Asbell's reign and challenges him to a duel. Being inexperienced in battle, Cain tries to avoid fighting her. She easily defeats him, but is soon challenged by "the Mysterious Masked Warrior" (Princess Charlotte).
- Tia is a pink-haired slave girl who was being sold by slave traders in Norland when Cain and Chiffon interfered. In gratitude for setting her free, Tia became Cain's maid and cook. It was due to her bravery that she was able to retrieve Tedmond's strategy plans, which eventually led to Norland's victory over Tedmond.
- Sandra is a red-haired leader of the Emerald Fist, a bandit group from a distant land. Sandra was once the daughter of a Lord who was eventually betrayed and imprisoned. The new Lord sold Sandra into slavery, but nothing else is revealed about her childhood. She wears a patch over her right eye, for reasons unknown, and wields a belted zanbato blade.

=== Minor characters ===
- Ann is a small, brown-haired, ambassador of the Dwarves, who is appointed to Norland after Tsubaki's victory over Bagwell in the contest for the Dwarven Woodlands. Ann is very apprehensive about the role, however, since her position is to always try to stay neutral in the war, but at the climatic point when all seemed lost for Norland, Ann and the Dwarves come to their aid and become instrumental in the fall of Lord Francis and Norland's victory.
- Bagwell is a warrior who, as a young man, was defeated by Tsubaki's father in dojo combat. Not willing to lose, he took Tsubaki hostage and killed Tsubaki's father. Bagwell then proceeded to rape and kill Tsubaki's mother. Tsubaki would later volunteer herself to face Bagwell in the contest between Tedmond and Norland to determine who would gain lordship of the Dwarven Woodlands. Through her superior skill, Tsubaki bests and kills Bagwell, winning the match for Norland.
- Elise is a fairy that was rescued by Cain Asbell. Elise stays around early in Cain's reign as Lord of Norland, protecting the land. She shows herself less and less as time moves on, only when Cain is very troubled by a problem that could lead to a bad end for either himself, his allies, or the realm of Norland.
- "The Mysterious Masked Warrior": A parody of the magical girl genre, the Masked Warrior (Princess Charlotte in disguise) uses quick moves and the power of "Love Escalation" in an attempt to beat Tsubaki. The effort fails, but her defeat leads Cain to ultimate victory over Tsubaki.
