= List of Utawarerumono episodes =

Utawarerumono is a 26-episode anime television series based on the visual novel of the same name by Leaf. The series aired in Japan between April 3 and September 25, 2006. With the first DVD release of the anime on August 23, 2006, a short bonus episode lasting about seven minutes was also included. The opening theme is "Musōka" by Suara, the first ending theme used for the first 25 episodes is "Madoromi no Rinne" by Eri Kawai, and the second ending theme used for the final episode is "Kimi ga Tame" by Suara. The North American rights to the Utawarerumono anime were initially held by ADV Films for US$109,201 effective August 1, 2006, who completed a full DVD release of the entire series. In July 2008, Funimation announced that the license to Utawarerumono (and other titles formerly held by ADV) had transferred to them.

A three-episode Utawarerumono original video animation (OVA) series was developed by the creators of the anime. These episodes focus on side stories from the game which were not covered in the TV series. The first OVA was released on June 5, 2009. The OVA's opening theme is "Adamant Faith" by Suara and its ending theme is "Yume no Tsuzuki" by Rena Uehara. In the first OVA, the episode focuses mainly on Ulthury's relationship with the child, Fumirul, rescued from Niwe's attack, and how she refuses to give up Fumirul to another family, going so far as to attack her friends.

The anime adaptation of Utawarerumono: The False Faces was announced on June 7, 2015. It is produced by White Fox and directed by Keitaro Motonaga, with Takamitsu Kōno supervising the series' scripts, Masahiko Nakata adapting the original character designs, and Naoya Shimokawa and Aquaplus composing the music. The series aired from October 3, 2015, to March 26, 2016, and it is streamed on Crunchyroll. (Note: Then owned by The Chernin Group and AT&T through Otter Media.) Suara performed the two opening theme songs "Fuantei na Kamisama" and "Ten Kakeru Hoshi," as well as the two ending theme songs "Yumekaotsutsuka" and "Hoshi Kudaru Sora Aogimite."

On October 19, 2019, an anime adaptation of Utawarerumono: Mask of Truth was announced. In November 2021, it was revealed to be a television series adaptation produced by White Fox, with Kenichi Kawamura directing, Itsuki Yokoyama writing the series' scripts, Masahiko Nakata designing the characters and serving as chief animation director, and Aquaplus composing the music. The 28-episode series aired from July 3 to December 25, 2022, on Tokyo MX and BS11, with the first two episodes premiering back-to-back. (Note: Tokyo MX lists the series premiere at 25:00 on July 2, 2022, which is effectively 1:00 a.m. JST on July 3.) The opening theme song is "Hito Nanda", and the ending theme song is "Hyakunichisō", both performed by Suara. Crunchyroll has licensed the series in the English-speaking regions.

== Episode list ==
=== Utawarerumono (2006) ===
No.	Title	Original release date
1	"Something Uninvited"; Transliteration: "Manekarezaru Mono" (Japanese: 招かれざるもの)	April 3, 2006
A strange man is found by a girl and her family and nursed back to health. He appears to have lost all of his memories, and can't seem to remove a mask of bone affixed to his forehead. The girl introduces herself as Eruru. With her is her grandmother Tusukuru. The man noticed that a child is hiding and at the same time staring at him. Eruru said it's her little sister Aruru who is just too shy to approach him. The man is given clothes to wear and Tusukuru said the clothes he is wearing is from her son and that he reminds her of him. The man appreciates the help the family did for him and ask about Eruru's father because he didn't see him. Eruru said that their father has already passed away when they were little and their mother also died right after giving birth to Aruru. Knowing that, the man feels sorry for wearing something so precious and wants to give it back. Tusukuru appreciates his concern and insists that he wears it if her son's clothing could help someone in need. The man wanted to go outside to find something he could do since he has already bothered Eruru's family too much. Worried that the man's health might get worse, Eruru is asked by her grandmother to assist him while he is out. While walking around the village, the man learned of the rumors about him from Teoro, one of the distinguished villagers. The man later noticed something at Eruru's back and touched it. Eruru reacts to it and accidentally pushed the man. She apologized and told him not to touch her tail because she is sensitive in there, making him realize that it's a real tail. While they take a rest, Nuwangi and his men came to take the villager's money and belongings. Eruru came to stop it. As they talked Nuwangi is revealed to be from the village and Eruru's childhood friend. Nuwangi makes a fake promise and forces to take Eruru with him. The man came and stopped Nuwangi. He said that he came to stop Nuwangi because he and Eruru are a family and forced Nuwangi and his men to leave the village. Away from the village, Nuwangi throws rocks and destroyed a shrine due to his anger towards the man who humiliated him. Later on, Nuwangi felt an omen and cowardly runs. That night, the villagers talked about Mutikapa the Queen of the Forest being angry that someone wrecked her shrine. A villager confirmed that it's true. At first, the villagers blame the man for it. But Eruru told them that it's not him because the man is with her all day. The villagers apologize to the man and decided to build Mutikapa's shrine and offer something to please her. The man told them his thoughts that why would a god be angered for something trivial as this.
2	"The Violent King of the Forest"; Transliteration: "Araburu Mori no Ō" (Japanese: 荒ぶる森の王)	April 10, 2006
The Queen of the forest, Mutikapa, is angered and began killing some of the townspeople. The man, Eruru, and the villagers started fixing Mutikapa's shrine in hopes that it stops attacking the villagers. Eruru told the man how important the shrine is. That they pray to it for the food, shelter, and medicines that they have been blessed with. The man told her why they should be thankful for someone that they fear. The night comes and Mutikapa once again attacked the village. Eruru's grandmother told them about her big sister as a sacrifice to please the gods a long time ago. That her sacrificed kept the village safe up until now. After hearing the story, the man tried to stop it but he fails to do so. Eruru came to help him escape but they couldn't get away from Mutikapa. As it started raining, Mutikapa flee. Later on, the man works with the others to figure out a way to defeat it. The man presents Mutikapa's hard fur to break when drench in water which explains Mutikapa to flee when it started to rain. The man plan's to be the bait to lure Mutikapa to drench in water for the villagers to kill it. Teoro one of the distinguished villager, plans to help him lure Mutikapa. Before they commence their plan, Eruru told him not to be reckless since they are already a family. The man said that everything would be fine and he plans to return alive. Eruru's grandmother gave him her son's fan blade to serve as his charm. They started hunting Mutikapa and killed it. Upon returning to the village, they heard that Aruru went missing only to find her carrying Mutikapa's child. The villagers think of a way to deal with the problem. In the end, they accept Mutikapa's child to their village as suggested by the man since he believes that a child is born without a sin. Later, they held a festival for Mutikapa's departure to the next world. Aruru went to see the man and started calling him "father". Eruru's grandmother thinks that the man shouldn't go on without a name and decided to call the man Hakuowlo, the same name she gave to Eruru and Aruru's father.
3	"Purple Amber"; Transliteration: "Murasaki Kohaku / Muikōha" (Japanese: 紫琥珀)	April 17, 2006
Hakuowlo and Eruru offer flowers to Mutikapa's shrine. Eruru told Hakuowlo that the flower she brought is called "Eruru" and it is the flower where she got her name. She also told the legend behind it. It is about the story of a girl named Eruru who was sacrificed to the forest and became one with it. Aruru and Mutikapa's child also come to offer flowers. Eruru said that the flowers that Aruru have is called "Aruru" that blooms around "Erurus". Both flowers were said to be sisters. Legend says that Aruru is about the little sister who waited for her sister's return for eternity. Back at the village, soldiers who fled from war seeks help from the village. The villagers don't know what to do with them as they don't have enough resources to sustain them. Tusukuru insist on helping them. She told the villagers that people should help each other in times of need and through it, they could go on living during hard times. The night comes and Eruru woke Hakuowlo to tell him that Tusukuru is missing. Hakuowlo went to look for her. Suddenly, someone attacked him. Hakuowlo and the assassin continue to fight until before they land their final blow that Tusukuru along with a pair of female twin stopped them. Tusukuru seems to know the assassin. The assassin respects her wish and is obedient to her. Tusukuru explained everything to Hakuowlo. She told him about an ill child that she knows that she often visits to check-up. Hakuowlo asked why she kept it secret. Tusukuru told him that the girl happens to be from a group of bandits. Now that Hakuowlo knows it, Tusukuru told him to come with them. At first the assassins seems to be against it but Tusukuru told him that Hakuowlo is a friend of hers. Before they go, the assassin introduced himself as Oboro and asked for Hakuowlo's name. Oboro gets mad when he heard Hakuowlo's name and thinks that Hakuowlo is messing up with him. But Tusukuru told him that she is the one who gave Hakuowlo that name. Arriving at the bandit's camp, they immediately went to the ill child's room. Oboro went to talked to her. The ill child is a girl who is called Yuzuha and she is Oboro's little sister. Yuzuha is blind and only felt the presence of Tusukuru through the smell of herbs. Tusukuru checked Yuzuha's condition. Yuzuha then asked of the other person which is Hakuowlo. Yuzuha is glad to have a visitor other than Tusukuru and his brother. Tusukuru gave Hakuowlo and Yuzuha some time to talk while she went outside dragging Oboro along with her. Yuzuha asked about Hakuowlo. Hakuowlo only told her of the things he had experience in the village and that he had no memories prior to the days Tusukuru found him. Hakuowlo in return asked her of the condition she had. Yuzuha herself didn't know when it happened and she was always like this. Hakuowlo apologized to her. Yuzuha smiles and asked Hakuowlo to promised her that he will come again. Hakuowlo and Tusukuru went back to the village and saw Eruru waiting for them outside their house. Tusukuru told her that she check-up the condition of a sickly girl and apologize to have bothered Eruru and even Aruru. That night, one of the twins who serve Oboro asked for Tusukuru to come see Yuzuha immediately. Hakuowlo went with her to see Yuzuha. Oboro is in tense of his sister's condition. Yuzuha's conditions have gone worse. Thankfully Tusukuru brought with her herb that is called Mui Kohwa that could temporarily ease Yuzuha's condition. Tusukuru told Oboro that Yuzuha is still far from being safe since the herb that she brought is an expensive one and she only have a few of those. If Yuzuha stopped from taking these herbs, she will definitely die. Oboro grieved his sister's faith. Later that night, Oboro went to a castle to steal. As he was about to escape, he was found by the guards and was stop by a samurai who calls himself Benawi, an Inkara's samurai general. Benawi told Oboro that he has no experience of war and is being arrogant for not having tasted defeat. As Oboro fell to the ground, he asked Benawi to kill him but the latter didn't find value to kill him and left him. That morning, Mutikapa's child found Oboro and called Aruru and Hakuowlo. They treat Oboro's wounds. Oboro thank them and went to see his sister. At the village, Nuwangi and his men return and have brought their lord with them.
4	"The Path of No Return"; Transliteration: "Modorenu Michi" (Japanese: 戻れぬ道)	April 24, 2006
As Nuwangi and his men approached the village with their lord Sasante. Tusukuru and the whole village come to meet with them. Tusukuru asked for their purpose. Sasante told them some thief came to steal from his mansion and that the village is currently hiding the thief. Not pleased with their arrival, Tusukuru bad mouthed Nuwangi and Sasante. Offended, the soldiers pointed their blades towards Tusukuru. Aruru throws Sasante a stone and Mutikapa's child Mukkuru bit the lizard mount carrying Sasante. It caused chaos for soldiers. Out of rage, one of soldiers tried to attack Aruru. Tusukuru shielded Aruru from the soldier and she was the one who was slashed instead. The villagers can't believe what happened. Out of fear, Sasante and the soldiers retreated. The villagers treated Tusukuru's wounds hoping that she would recover. Tusukuru regained consciousness and asked for her two granddaughters. She told them about her sister who has the same name as Eruru and how she was reminded of her time with her sister as she look at Eruru and Aruru. She also told them that there may be times that they won't get along but whatever happens they should work together since they each other as sisters. Tusukuru also called for Hakuowlo and asked him to look after her granddaughter and the village. Having told everything, Tusukuru died. Later, Hakuowlo told Oboro what happened. Oboro can't forgive the lord who was responsible for what happened. Even if he knows that Tusukuru wouldn't like him to avenge her death, he still went to Sasante's mansion and tried to kill the lord but he got captured instead. Now the Tusukuru died, the villagers had a meeting and choose Hakuowlo as their new chief but Hakuowlo thinks that he isn't up to the task. Teoro reminded him of the responsibility Tusukuru had given him and Hakuowlo finally made up his mind of becoming the chief. Oboro's subordinates ask Hakuowlo to save Oboro and the villagers also wants to help thinking that this is how they could avenge Tusukuru. Hakuowlo and the members from the village went on and attacked Sasante's mansion. Meanwhile, Oboro who was imprisoned has once again been given a chance to escape by General Benawi. Hakuowlo and the villagers have finally reached Sasante. Hakuowlo killed the lord stabbing him with his steel fan. Looking at what they did, Hakuowlo once again saw a fragment of his memory. Hakuowlo realized the consequence of their actions. He met up with Oboro and asked him if his is fine. Knowing that he is fine, Hakuowlo punched him. Hakuowlo somehow blames himself and Oboro who made him take advantage of the situation which led him to attack the lord's mansion. He told Oboro that the imperial court will not stand for what they did and that they would either fight them or be slain by them.
5	"The Daughter of the Forest"; Transliteration: "Mori no Musume" (Japanese: 森の娘)	May 1, 2006
The emperor has summoned Benawi and ordered him to eliminate the village that rebelled and killed his little brother, Sasante. Benawi suggests that they should first hear the villagers' side of the story before they proceed on eliminating the villagers. The emperor turns him down and tells him to quickly gather their troops. Meanwhile, Hakuowlo takes over command of the station which they captured, beginning to strategically lead a large-scale rebellion. Fulfilling his promise to Tusukuru, Hakuowlo asks Eruru and Aruru to return to the village but they insist on staying. Eruru told them that they also want to help in any way they can and that they want to assist the men by doing normal chores like cooking and doing laundry. After giving this some thought, Hakuowlo agrees. Later, the villagers are surprised to see a carriage carrying a princess-like girl which is Oboro's sister, Yuzuha, followed by Oboro and his group. Oboro asks Hakuowlo to let them aid the villagers in their rebellion as payment for saving him twice. Oboro even calls him "brother" for it. Hakuowlo does not seem to be interested in the offer, seeing that Oboro always disregards his life on the battlefield. But since they need to gather all the forces they can, he agrees to the alliance. Hakuowlo asks Eruru to look after Yuzuha. Eruru, along with Aruru, comes and introduces themselves to Yuzuha. Yuzuha tells Eruru that she reminds her of Tusukuru in every way. Meanwhile, Oboro told Hakuowlo that it was actually Yuzuha's idea to come to their aid. Oboro does not seem to like that idea but he still agrees because he believes that this is the first time he saw Yuzuha requests and that she may be right. After hearing Oboro's story, Hakuowlo told Oboro of his plans that they are currently seeking help from the nearby villages to aid them on battle. Even if they know that most people wouldn't want to get involve with them, they would still try since there might be few people who will help and that every people counts. Later that night, Hakuowlo and Eruru saw Aruru guarding the food storage. They got suspicious of her and opened to store room to found out that Mukkuru is eating their food supply and has grown so big. Eruru scold Aruru but Hakuowlo sided with Aruru cuz he thinks that Aruru is now reflecting on his actions. The next day Hakuowlo, Oboro, and the men went on to a nearby village to seek help. As they approached the village, they saw a huge smoke coming from the village they were going. They quickly went to the village and to their surprised they village was already destroyed. At the village, they saw Benawi and his troops. Benawi tried to talk to them but Hakuowlo and the others didn't find the time to talk. A battle has started. As the battle goes on, Hakuowlo's group has quickly been put on the disadvantage. Aruru came mounted on Mukkuru. Benawi thought of Mukkuru as Mutikapa. Thinking that the tables have turned, Benawi asked Hakuowlo if they believe that what they are doing is right. Hakuowlo replied that "If there is hell then I'm sure that is where I will fall". Benawi also asked for Hakuowlo's name and retreated. After the battle, Hakuowlo once again blames himself for putting their village in a predicament and for taking advantage of the villagers. Oboro told Hakuowlo that he shouldn't think that way because he will just betray the trust that the villagers have given to him. Back on his feet, Hakuowlo assumed that Benawi isn't the one who put the nearby village into ruin. Since he assumed that Benawi isn't a person who will use underhanded tactics. Back on the empire, the emperor is angered by the news that Benawi reported to him. The emperor decided to strip Benawi of his position as the one who lead the battle against the rebels. At the same time, the emperor summoned his nephew, Nuwangi to replace Benawi.
6	"The Assembled Powers"; Transliteration: "Tsudou Chikara" (Japanese: 集う力)	May 8, 2006
At the Inkara Palace, Nuwangi makes fun of Benawi and his men to Kurou, Benawi's second-in-command. Kurou gets mad and drive Nuwangi against the wall. Benawi arrives and ask Kurou to let Nuwangi go and apologize for Kurou's actions. Back at the rebel's stronghold, the village men continues their training. Then, men from another village came to join them and swear to follow every order that Hakuowlo has given to them. Later on, a suspicious man who is climbing their walls was spotted and was sent to Hakuowlo. The suspicious man told his story and that he is just a merchant and showed his goods. Eruru and the others seems to have taken interest in his goods. Hakuowlo asked the merchant to leave immediately for him not to get involve. The merchant agreed and Hakuowlo himself lead the merchant in his way out as an apology to the harsh treatment he has receive. Before the merchant go on his way, he warned Hakuowlo to be more careful and pointed a knife to Hakuowlo telling him that he is dead if he is an assassin. At a certain checkpoint, Benawi and his men was currently assigned there. They were looking a person who is trying to get past the checkpoint. Benawi and Kurou found the man but Benawi let the man go. Finding an opportunity, Benawi speak to the person in the shadows. The person he is talking with reveals himself as the merchant. Benawi asked how is Hakuowlo's group doing. He also asked the merchant to hand over the thing he told him to get. Upon receiving, Benawi paid the merchant and the merchant leaves. At the rebel's stronghold, Hakuowlo and the village men is thinking of a way to take over Inkara Palace. In order to do that, they must take over a certain checkpoint that may give them an advantage. The problem is that they need the cooperation of the village beyond the checkpoint. As their luck seems to run out, the man who escaped the checkpoint arrives and told them that his village wants to join them. Following their plan, Hakuowlo and the others went to take over the checkpoint. Hakuowlo is surprise to see Benawi's group to be in there and they had a rough battle. But thanks to their plan, Benawi and his men retreated and they manage to take over the checkpoint. Back at the Inkara Palace, the emperor get mad at Benawi for failing to protect a single checkpoint while Nuwangi has already taken Chenma, a settlement for those who didn't join the rebellion. The emperor did it to avoid unnecessary disaster to come. Benawi told the emperor that the country is slowly crumbling because of his actions. He told him that the people he just destroyed are the foundations of their country and without it there will be no future. The emperor got mad at Benawi for insulting him. Nuwangi arrived and imprisoned Benawi.
7	"Advance Towards the Emperor"; Transliteration: "Kōto Shinkō" (Japanese: 皇都侵攻)	May 15, 2006
After taking over the checkpoint, the rebels have constantly winning every battle, and gain the favour of the country men. One night, Eruru has finally been able to find time to talk with Hakuowlo. She also asks Hakuowlo to talk with Yuzuha. Later that night, the rebels have located Nuwangi and his men who have taken hostages. The rebels have fought them with ease and Nuwangi's men retreated leaving him behind. The rebels captured Nuwangi and he was sent to their stronghold to decide his fate. The next day comes and the people have gathered to see the captured samurai general all roped up. Nuwangi seems to be ready and asked for his death. The people asked Hakuowlo to decide his fate. Eruru saw what happened and went to see Nuwangi. Knowing that Nuwangi is Eruru's childhood friend, Hakuowlo let Eruru decide Nuwangi's fate. After a short pause, Eruru asked Hakuowlo to let him go. The villagers were surprised of her decision and have let Nuwangi go. Eruru bid him farewell as he went away in shame, and never again to be seen. The rebels continue on their battle and finally reach Inkara Palace. As the rebels broke through the castle walls, Kurou finds an opportunity to release Benawi from prison. He told Benawi that the country was doomed and asked him to find another country to serve. Benawi appreciates Kurou's concern but as a samurai general, he sworn to serve his country till the end. He and Kurou joins the battle inside the palace and once again fought with Hakuowlo and Oboro. As the battle continues and the rebels almost reach the emperor, Benawi stopped fighting with Hakuowlo and went to see the emperor. He told the emperor that their defeat is inevitable and there is nowhere to escape. He asked the emperor to kill himself right now to preserve his and the kingdom's pride and dignity but the emperor refused to take his life and still clings to his desires. Benawi is ashamed to see his emperor in such a state and killed him. Hakuowlo arrived late when he found Benawi in the throne room. Benawi told him to announce the death of the emperor and asked him to lead the country to prosperity. Just as about Benawi is about to stab himself in the neck, Hakuowlo stopped him and told him to stop running away and see things through the end. Hakuowlo and Benawi went to the battlefield to announce the emperor's death. After hearing the news, everyone has stopped in their battles. The rebels shout their victory while the palace soldiers accepted defeat. Benawi and Kurou have decided to join Hakuowlo in building a new country and named it, Tusukuru. In an unknown area where people with wings reside, they have heard the news of Hakuowlo and the rebels' victory. Curious of what happened, a priestess volunteered to go there and act as the holiness' mediator.
8	"The Arbitrator"; Transliteration: "Chōteisha" (Japanese: 調停者)	May 22, 2006
The war has ended and peace finally came to their country. People are rebuilding their villages that were destroyed during the rebellion. Teoro, his wife and the other villagers returned to their village of Yamayura while Hakuowlo, Eruru, Aruru, Oboro and company remained in the imperial capital. A crowning ceremony was held and Hakuowlo became the emperor of their newly build nation. Benawi and Kurou swear allegiance to him and maintain their ranks. As their life in the capital continues, mediators from Onkamiyamukai came. The Onkamiyamukai are mediators authorized by the high temple of Witsalnemitea who mediate relationships among nations. The mediators are led by a priestess with white wings named Ulthury. She has an aide named Munto. They came to Hakuowlo for friendship and to observe the new nation. Hakuowlo volunteered to guide them. But due to his duties, Hakuowlo asked Eruru to guide the mediators. One night, Ulthury stumbled on Eruru's medicine room and had a talk with her. Ulthury knows about Eruru's grandmother Tusukuru because she once taken interest in medicine but stopped due to her duties as the priestess of Onkamiyamukai. Meanwhile, Hakuowlo went to a nearby lake to enjoy the view of the night sky. There he saw a girl with silver hair and black wings flying around the night sky above the lake. Upon his return, he went to his room and saw the same girl lying on his bed. The girl woke up and she was surprised that Hakuowlo can see her. She chanted a spell to make herself disappear and run away but unknown to her that her spell didn't work. She was chased back to Hakuowlo's room and ended up hiding in the basket because of Mukkuru. Ulthury came to Hakuowlo's room sensing some familiar presence. She noticed someone hiding in the basket and called her. The girl went out of her hiding and it turns out that the silver haired girl with black wings is Ulthury's little sister Camyu. Ulthury apologizes for the commotion that Camyu have caused him. Aruru came to sleep with Hakuowlo but dropped the idea as soon as she saw the commotion in Hakuowlo's room. The next day comes and as usual Hakuowlo is busy with his duties as emperor. Camyu who is studying runs away runs away from it. She saw Aruru and tries to befriend her but Aruru seems to avoid her because she doesn't seem to like her because of the commotion she caused last night. Hakuowlo who also skipped his duties gave her an advice on befriending Aruru. Later, Camyu went to see Aruru who is currently with Yuzuha. She offered her food as a sign of the friendship and Aruru accepted it. Moments later, Camyu, Aruru, and even Yuzuha was found playing around the palace. Several Onkami come to Hakuowlo's castle as arbitators and to gather more information on his new country Tusukuru.
9	"Taboo"; Transliteration: "Kinki" (Japanese: 禁忌)	May 29, 2006
As the large country of Shikeripechim threatens invasion, Hakuowlo devises a cunning plan to hold off Shikeripechim's emperor, Niwe, and his far superior military force which ten times as many of theirs.
10	"The Mercenary"; Transliteration: "Yōhei" (Japanese: 傭兵)	June 5, 2006
A powerful mercenary named Karulau from the kingdom of Na Tunk, a country known for selling slaves, is brought to the castle after killing all the sailors inside the ship she is in. She is found by Benawi and the others and held her captive. After a while, Hakuowlo decided to let her join in his ranks if she is able to show her worth as a fighter. Benawi volunteered to be her opponent. Everyone is dumbfounded at the insane super strength Karulau possessed, breaking every sword that she wields as she smashed it on the ground, creating a huge tremor as she clashed blades with Benawi. Hakuowlo stopped the battle and welcomed her in his army. Hakuowlo asked a merchant to make a huge heavy broad sword specifically made for Karulau. Karulau's sword is so heavy that even a large person like Kurou can't lift it but to Karulau, lifting her sword is a breeze.
11	"The Eternal Promise"; Transliteration: "Eien no yakusoku" (Japanese: 永遠の約束)	June 12, 2006
While they are gathering allies to defend against Shikeripechim with the help of Ulthury of Onkami as their mediator, Teoro came to inform them that Kuccha Keccha attacks Eruru's former village, Yamayura. After Hakuowlo deployed his forces to fight Kuccha Keccha, Teoro died of blood loss from his injury. After the battle, they found out about Teoro's death. Kurou, who checked the situation of the village, informed them that Yamayura has been burned to ashes and all the villagers died. At night, Hakuowlo had a drink with Karulau. Hakuowlo wondered why the villagers didn't leave their village knowing that they won't stand a chance against Kuccha Keccha. Karulau told him that the villagers are deadmen the moment that they have decided to protect their village with their own life. Hakuowlo realized what Teoro meant when he said that "they will live in their village until they die" after they parted after Hakuowlo become the emperor. At first, Hakuowlo didn't want to attack Kuccha Keccha without knowing their intentions even if it hurts him to see that Yamayura is no more. But after the second attack from Kuccha Keccha, the Tusukuru Empire decided to respond to Kuccha Keccha's continued attacks, and wage war with them. Arriving in the battlefield, Hakuowlo is being targeted by a female enemy soldier named Touka of Evankulga and the enemy's general named Orikakan, calling him the evil Rakshain and a traitor.
12	"Unrest"; Transliteration: "Dōyō" (Japanese: 動揺)	June 19, 2006
At the battlefield, Kuccha Keccha retreated after an attack from Hakuowlo's group. While patrolling the area, Oboro had a duel with Touka and got beaten up. Before leaving, Touka warns them of the Kuccha Keccha's strength. At the palace, Hakuowlo and the others had a meeting. They discuss the strength of Kuccha Keccha and the geography of its country. Due to their land being flat, Kuccha Keccha specializes in cavalry and pre-emptive battles. Being wary of their enemy having an Evankulga in their ranks, they also discussed about the Evankulga clan. The Evankulga Clan are a clan who lives in the high lands and every one of them specializes have great sword skills and follows a moral code. After knowing their enemy, they still find no clue finding them as their enemy keeps on moving their camp. With Aruru's help, they were able to locate a bridge where the enemy passes when they are moving away from them. Hakuowlo and the others immediately deployed to the bridge that Aruru mentioned. Arriving at the bridge, they were confronted by Touka and her subordinates. Hakuowlo tried to confirm why they called him Rakshain. Touka said that he is Rakshain, the man who killed his wife, his children and his fellow soldiers. After they have killed Touka's subordinates, Karulau fought with Touka. With Touka on the bridge, Karulau destroyed the bridge and Touka falls. At night, at the palace, Hakuowlo started to think that what Touka said about him is true and told Eruru how frightening it is to have no memories of his own, knowing that what others think of him might be true. Even after hearing everything from Hakuowlo, Eruru still believes that he is a good man.
13	"Battle of Bloodshed"; Transliteration: "Chinurareta Tatakai" (Japanese: 血塗られた戦い)	June 26, 2006
People started to doubt Hakuowlo as they wondered why someone from Evankulga who upholds justice for the greater good bears grudge against Hakuowlo. Meanwhile at the palace, Hakuowlo is getting more frightened of what he really is after being told that he is a murder. Eruru came to talk to him, telling him that he is the kind Hakuowlo that they know. Hakuowlo's plan to defeat the Kuccha Keccha succeeds and he confronts Emperor Orikakan; Hakuowlo tried to reason with him but Orikakan didn't listen to him and attacked him. Hakuowlo stopped him and he is asked by Orikakan to kill him. The emperor of Shikeripechim, Niwe killed Orikakan instead and told Hakuowlo that he used Kuccha Kechha's attack to awaken the demon inside Hakuowlo by restoring Hakuowlo's memory.
14	"Destruction"; Transliteration: "Senka" (Japanese: 戦禍)	July 2, 2006
After the death of Orikakan, Hakuowlo releases Touka from her prison and decided to let her deliver the body of Orikakan to Kuccha Keccha. Recently, Shikeripechim frequently attacks helpless villages in Tusukuru, tiring out Hakuowlo's group as they advance through the countryside. Knowing that they won't stand a chance by directly attacking Shikeripechim, Hakuowlo hatches a desperate plan in order to defend his nation and that is to kill the Shikeripechim's emperor, NIwe before Shikeripechim's forces took over their country. They will be able to do that by splitting their group into two. The first one is to defend their country against Shikeripechim while the second one heads directly to the camp where Niwa is located and kill him. But before they could initiate their plan, another group of soldiers from Shikeripechim attacks a village. They went and stopped the enemy soldiers with Touka officially joining Hakuowlo's group to give him honor for letting her return the body of Orikakan to his country.
15	"End of the Banquet"; Transliteration: "Utage no Owari" (Japanese: 宴の終わり)	July 9, 2006
The great war has break out between the country of Tusukuru and Shikeripechim. Hakuowlo and the others execute their tactics as planned. Oboro, Benawi, Kurou, and most of the soldiers stayed at the palace to defend it against 50,000 soldiers from Shikeripechim while Hakuowlo, Karulau, Touka, and some few soldiers infiltrate Shikeripechim's palace to kill Niwe. Eruru came along with them to see with her eyes what they have been fighting for. Inside the palace, the three generals of Shikeripechim stands in their way. Karulau faces all three of them, allowing Hakuowlo and the others to go without her. After Hakuowlo and the others left, Karulau and the three generals started to fight. With just a few minutes, Karulau was able to kill all three of them, focusing on killing one of them at a time. Inside the palace, they are greeted by Niwe. Niwe ordered undead soldiers that he captured from different countries to attack them. These undead soldiers keep on getting up as they keeps on slashing them. After cathching up with Hakuowlo and the others, Karulau dismembered an undead and told them to do what she does. After finding an opening, Hakuowlo went after Niwe until they reached the throne room. There, they had a conversation. Niwe issued an order to burn his own country and put the blame on Hakuowlo, telling him that everything happened because they are meant to be sacrifice for Hakuowlo in order to awaken the beast inside him. Hakuowlo couldn't accept Niwe's illogical thinking and started to fight him. As they continue on their battle, the beast inside Hakuowlo awakens and devoured Niwe. After gaining control of his body, Hakuowlo saw the aftermath of his battle against NIwe and seems to not like the outcome. He met up with Eruru and the others telling them that they have won the war. The soldiers of Shikeripechim who are advancing to their palace have started to retreat after they heard of Niwe's death.
16	"The End of the Bloodshed"; Transliteration: "Tatakai no Hate" (Japanese: 戦いの果て)	July 16, 2006
It's been less than a month after their battle with Shikeripechim. The people of Tusukuru are rebuilding their villages. Hakuowlo and the others also helped the people of Shikeripechim, who also became a victim of Niwe, to re-establish Shikeripechim's country and government. Hakuowlo told them to abandon their land and relocate their country because their land might remind them of the bad things NIwe has done to their country. At night, Hakuowlo is being haunted by what Niwe said to him and has nightmares about it. He walks around the palace and met with Touka who joins him in his walks. At the storeroom, they saw Aruru, and Mukkuru getting food while Karulau grabs bottles of sake. The next day, a duel between Benawi and Oboro takes places to see how strong each is. Oboro may have improved his skills but Benawi still won the battle. At night, Hakuowlo is still haunted by Niwe in his dreams and went around the palace again. This time, he stumbled at Camyu drinking a lot of water and seems not to look well. When Hakuowlo asked for her condition, Ulthury came to help Camyu return to her room and told Hakuowlo that Camyu will be fine. The next day, the people of Shikeripechim had an audience with Hakuowlo and told him that they don't want to relocate their country because they still wanted to live in the place where they born. After considering their pleas, Hakuowlo and the others went to see the current state of Shikeripechim. In Shikeripechim, the mark of war still lingers around the place. There are burnt houses everywhere and no trees and grass to be seen. Eruru dragged Hakuowlo somewhere in Shikeripechim where she has planted plant seeds a month ago. They saw that the seeds are growing. Eruru showed Hakuowlo the seeds to tell him that as long as they have the will to start anew, they will be able to leave their past behind and move on towards tomorrow. Hakuowlo understood what Eruru meant and decided to let the people of Shikeripechim to rebuild their nation in their homeland. During the night, Hakuowlo went to see Camyu as she flies and dances around orbs of light above the lake. Upon seeing Camyu, Hakuowlo is amazed to see that something believed to be out of this world exists. Then, in the shadows, a bulky old man with an eye patch from the clan of Evankulga appeared to him and introduces himself as Genjimaru. Genjimaru told Hakuowlo that his master wishes to see him. After Hakuowlo followed Genjimaru, he is introduced to another emperor named Kuuya Amrulineulka of Kunnekamun.
17	"The Young Emperor"; Transliteration: "Osanaki Ō / Osanaki Ōruo" (Japanese: 幼き皇)	July 23, 2006
Kuuya and Hakuowlo have a long talk alone about the world they live in and the state of affairs. Kuuya asked Hkuoro how he who once a nobody is able to rise in his current state. Hakuowlo simply told Kuuya that he is only doing the best he can for others. Hakuowlo asked why Kuuya asked him such question. Kuuya replied to Hakuowlo that Hakuowlo might be a Kunneietai, people who are under same divine protection of the Great God Onvitaikayan as the Shakukopolu clan. Kuuya asked Hakuowlo if he believes in Onvitaikayan as his god, the same god that Kuuya believes. Hakuowlo never heard of the name and told Kuuya if Onvitaikayan is Witsalnemitea in a different name. Kuuya felt offended by hearing Witsalnemitea and told Hakuowlo not to mention that name to him again. Kuuya explained to Hakuowlo that Witsalnemitea is a god of misfortune who overthrows Onvitaikayan, who is the original creator, in his throne and since then to be believed to be a "savior" in some clan. Kuuya wonders where Hakuowlo got the name. Hakuowlo told him that a clan held a mass In his country who believes that Witsalnemitea as their god. After a while, Kuuya and Hakuowlo's conversation ended. Kuuya told him that he will come to meet him again. The next day, Hakuowlo spends his time in Eruru's medicine room while he leaves his royal duties to Benawi. Later, Oboro who is suffering from a hangover went to asked Eruru to make a medicine. After that Eruru has made a revolting medicine which Oboro is forced to drink. Hakuowlo leaves and went outside where he is seen by a drunk Karulau and by Touka who wishes to guard him. At the palace, the trader from before comes back to sell them a mikyuum which is a rare and extremely valuable sacred beast who brings good fortune and has a liver that has good medicinal properties. Touka has taken a liking to the creature and suddenly changes personality, revealing her to have weakness for cute things. When the mikyuum sense danger from Oboro who wishes to make use of its liver to cure Yuzuha's sickness, it ran away and went to Aruru and Yuzuha. Oboro asked them to give him the mikyuum but Aruru and Yuzuha refused him upon learning that he will use its liver to cure Yuzuha since Yuzuha never wanted his brother to take someone's life to cure her illness. Then Aruru began to name it. Upon catching up, Hakuowlo and the trader heard the news from Oboro. The trader told them that the mikyuum will consider those who named it as its master. It left them no choice but to buy it. At night, Hakuowlo has yet another private discussion with Kuuya where he discovers that the masked emperor Kuuya is in fact a young girl. The reason why Kuuya always wears a mask is because people will think less of her, seeing that a little girl is an emperor of a country. After that, Kuuya proceeds to tell Hakuowlo another tale. She told him that the reason they have war is because Onvitaikayan is no longer in his throne and that her country is currently suffering because there are clans who are jealous of the divine protection that Onvitaikayan bestowed to her and her people who are from the Shakukopolu clan.
18	"Liberation Army"; Transliteration: "Kaihōgun" (Japanese: 解放軍)	July 31, 2006
While Hakuowlo and the others are having their meal in the palace, a messenger came to deliver news to them. According to the messenger, the rebel army led by Karulau's younger brother, Derihourai started a revolt to free the slaves in Na Tunk. Furthermore, the strength of the rebel army is slowly decreasing, lacking manpower and supplies. When the night came, Karulau, wearing a formal wear, begged Hakuowlo to send reinforcements to help the rebel army. According to Karulau, if Hakuowlo agrees, she will give herself to him. Hakuowlo can't decide what to do because he can't risk his country to engage war with another country again but he did say that he will find a way. Karulau assumed that Hakuowlo agreed and started to give herself to him in advance. Eruru went to see Hakuowlo, and misunderstood what Hakuowlo and Karulau are doing so she walked away. The next day, Eruru ignored Hakuowlo all day. Later, a messenger came and told them the condition of the rebel army. Upon hearing the news, Hakuowlo told Karulau that it is impossible to send reinforcements, breaking his deal with Karulau. At night, Karulau went to Hakuowlo's room and forces Hakuowlo to go on a journey with her as she carries Hakuowlo in his futon. As Hakuowlo and Karulau went out of the palace, Eruru, Aruru, Mukkuru, Yuzuha, Ulthury, Camyu, and Touka also joined them on their journey. The next day, Oboro, Benawi, Kurou, and Munto came looking for Hakuowlo and the others who went on a journey without telling them. Meanwhile, while they are travelling, Hakuowlo explained to Eruru that nothing happened between him and Karulau the other day and that their deal never happened. He also told her that he doesn't want a precious member of his family to have misunderstanding with him. When Hakuowlo and the others reached the territory of the rebel army, Derihourai and the rebel army appeared to them. Hakuowlo and the others introduced themselves as a mercenary who wants to help the rebel army to fight against the empire of Na Tunk. Derihourai also introduces himself to them and his rebel army of Karulauuatsuurei. Derihourai failed to recognize the face of his sister, Karulau. He told them that he didn't want their help and he turned them down. At night, an old man from the rebel army named Katumau came to see Karulau. Katumau recognized Karulau and tries to confirm if she really is Karulauuatsuurei, the original leader of the rebel army and wishes her to lead the rebel army once again. Karulau told him that she isn't Karulauuatsuurei anymore and that she is just a girl named Karulau. At the rebel camp, a traitor from the rebels took enemy soldiers with him at the camp, hoping to meet his wife and daughter if he helped the enemy soldiers. The enemy soldier killed the man and started attacking the rebels. After eliminating the soldiers, Derihourai bad mouthed the dead rebel who betrayed them. Karulau beat Derihourai and told Derihourai that he should try to understand the point of view of the weak and shouldn't look down on them. Karulau told him the reason that the strong Giriyagiya clan, the clan of Karulau and Derihourai, almost got wiped out is because of their arrogance in their strength. In the end, the rebel army accepted help from Hakuowlo and the others. Meanwhile at the palace of Na Tunk, Suonkasu, the emperor of Na Tunk, heard the news of Karulau's return and spoke to himself that he can't wait to see Karulau, his beloved again.
19	"The Parting"; Transliteration: "Ketsubetsu" (Japanese: 決別)	August 7, 2006
A flashback showing a young Karulau leaving behind to fight enemy soldiers as she helps the young Derihourai and Katumau escape from the Na Tunk palace and got separated from them. Back at the present, the rebel army has finally advance to the final defense of Na Tunk. They plan to infiltrate the palace with Hakuowlo, Derihourai, and the others entering the palace's waterways that Karulau knows while the rebel army lures most of the soldiers outside the palace. Before they initiate the plan, Derihourai asked Hakuowlo to give Karulau to the rebel army. Hakuowlo asked him why he has taken interest to Karulau. Derihourai, without knowing that Karulau is his sister, told Hakuowlo that Karulau reminded him of his sister, although a polar opposite of her when it comes to attitude. After that, Hakuowlo had a conversation with Karulau. He told her if it is ok for her not to return to her people and abandoned her past. Karure replied to him and said that it is fine with her and that with or without past doesn't change who she is. Executing their plan, Hakuowlo and the others successfully infiltrate the palace. In the throne room, they saw human slaves used as fertilizers to produce the most beautiful flowers. Then, Suonkasu with some soldiers appeared. Suonkasu revealed Karulau to be Karulauuatsuurei, his former empress and told them that he did everything from producing beautiful flowers and the elimination of the rebels to draw out Karulau. After that, a heated battle begins. After they got rid of the enemy soldiers, Suonkasu was killed by Derihourai. After the battle, Derihourai, who found out that Karulau is his sister, asked her to return to their group. Karulau promised him that she will return after he announced their victory to their allies outside the palace. After Derihourai went out, Karulau planned to break her promise to her brother from the start and told Hakuowlo and the others that they should immediately return to Tusukuru. A few days after they have returned to Tusukuru, Derihourai who is now the new emperor of Na Tunk came to thank the emperor of Tusukuru for the aid and supplies that they gave to them during the rebellion. Derihourai is surprised to find that Hakuowlo is the emperor of Tusukuru. Hakuowlo told him that he shouldn't thank him but the woman who requested him to help the rebels. Derihourai knew that the woman is Karulau and agreed. Meanwhile, Karulau never showed up to her brother and bid farewell as she speaks to herself.
20	"First Battle"; Transliteration: "Uijin" (Japanese: 初陣)	August 14, 2006
Kuuya sent Genjimaru's granddaughter, Sakuya to Hakuowlo to tell him that she wants to meet with him. At first, she wanted to give her Sakuya, her close friend, to him as a sign of friendship between their country. But Hakuowlo refused her offer because he didn't like to take Sakuya away from her. Then, Kuuya told Hakuowlo that she wanted to start a war with the countries that opposed them. Hakuowlo told her if she and her country of Kunnekamun will be okay. Kuuya told him that he shouldn't underestimate her country because they have been given great power as a blessing from their god, Onvitaikayan. The next day, Camyu sucked Aruru's blood and went missing. Everyone went to look for her, even Aruru. Hakuowlo found her but she didn't want to come back because she thinks that Aruru don't want to become friends with her anymore. She told Hakuowlo that in their clan, she is the only one who has black wings and people told her that it is because she has a blood that has a close relation to their ancestors. Furthermore, she is treated differently in their clan and has no friends until she met Aruru and Yuzuha. Hakuowlo told her that Aruru wouldn't severe their friendship by just sucking her blood and he also told her how worried they are looking for her. When Aruru came, she told Camyu that she forgives her and still wanted to be friends with her. Camyu returned to the palace as tears of joy dropped on her cheeks knowing that everyone in the palace treat her as a friend. After a few days, they heard a report from their soldier that Kuuya has waged war with Nosechesuka, one of the great three countries alongside Onkamiyamukai and Kunnekamun, and defeated them in just 3 days and still plans to defeat other countries that opposes her. Hakuowlo went to meet Kuuya again in order to dissuade her from waging war. Kuuya, who just experience killing someone for the first time, told Hakuowlo how she enjoyed it and does not want to stop.
21	"The Great Seal"; Transliteration: "On Rīyāku" (Japanese: 大封印)	August 21, 2006
After defeating the country Elemia, Kuuya is being convinced by her bloodthirsty advisers, Hauenkua and Hien, to start a war against every nation in order to unite the whole continent. Kuuya hesitates on doing it and instead listen to Genjimaru's suggestion of solidifying their country first. While solidifying their country, their people who are living at the borderline of their country were attacked. The people begged Kuuya to wage war to all countries and unify the nation. Having trouble on making her decisions, Kuuya went to meet Hakuowlo and had a conversation with him. Hakuowlo knew the problems that Kuuya is facing right now and told her that she shouldn't just rely on herself when making decisions because she is not alone. At Kunnekamun, more and more people wanted Kuuya to unify the nation. Hauenkua and Hien use this opportunity to once again convince Kuuya to wage war and unify the nation. Kuuya asked for Genjimaru for his opinion but Genjimaru is not present. Knowing that she must make haste in making her decision, even without Genjimaru's opinion, Kuuya has decided to follow the suggestion of her people. She started waging war to many countries. After winning every war, Kuuya decided to take over Onkamiyamukai. Genjimaru tried to stop Kuuya because waging war with Onkamiyamukai will guarantee that every country will be their enemy. Kuuya told him that they have gone too far to stop. On their way to Onkamiyamukai while inside their Avu-Kamuu, Kuuya and her army were trapped and were being crush on the great seal cast by the elders of Onkamiyamukai. However, with the help of Dii, the army of Kunnekamun was able to break through the great seal and successfully took over Onkamiyamukai. At Tusukuru Palace, Hakuowlo and the others heard the news that Onkamiyamukai has been taken by Kunnekamun. Furthermore, an army of Kunnekamun are already on their way to Tusukuru. Ulthury and Camyu are worried of their father and their people's condition but Ulthury and Camyu strengthen themselves and strongly believe that their people are gonna be fine. Ulthury send Munto to Onkamiyamukai to check the countries condition. While thinking of a plan, Hakuowlo knows how powerful the Avu-Kamuu of the Kunnekamun as this is the great power that the Kunnekamun's god, Onvitaikayan bestowed upon them. He then made a decision and told everyone to evacuate the capital while he and some others hold off the Kunnekamun. Oboro and the others told him to evacuate and let them handle the Kunnekamun since the Kunnekamun's objective is Hakuowlo. Hakuowlo agreed and he told everyone to meet later and make sure that they don't die.
22	"The Accursed Contract"; Transliteration: "Imawashiki keiyaku" (Japanese: 忌まわしき契約)	August 28, 2006
As the forces of Emperor Kuuya led by Hauenkua and Hien descended upon Tusukuru's capital, Oboro and the others tries to hold them off as Hakuowlo and the people of Tusukuru are evacuating. But Oboro and the others weren't able to stop the Kunnekamun from advancing towards the capital which resulted to numerous casualties and Kurou got injured as well. Then Hakuowlo went back for them, as he realize that the evacuation is going to take longer than they have, and decided to sacrifice himself to draw the Kunnekamun forces' attention away, ordering Benawi and the others to go and evacuate as well. Hakuowlo went and successfully all of the Kunnekamun force except for Hien because Hien was blocked by Karulau and Touka as they disobeyed Hakuowlo. As Hakuowlo continues to lure the enemies, Hauenkua eventually caught up with him and got him. However, Aruru isn't prepared to let this happen, and shows up riding Mukkuru. The immortal Mutikapa is able to attack Hauenkua's Avu-Kamuu without being hurt, but Aruru got hit with a single blow and died. However, the pool of blood growing behind Aruru begins to bring back Hakuowlo's memories, as he despairs Aruru's death. In his memories, he saw that he is once a scholar who stumbled upon a monster in a futuristic lab. Then an old scientist saw him and told him that the monster is the key on humanity's evolution who are once a monkey. After that, the scientist shoots him because he found out about the monster which is kept secret. Hakuowlo's blood got spilled on the monster, reviving it. Back in the present, Eruru went to look for Aruru and saw Hakuowlo holding the dead Aruru in his arms. While enjoying Hakuowlo's despair, Hauenkua stepped on Hakuowlo and Aruru. Suddenly, a black aura came from Hakuowlo and he transformed into the monster from his memories. He went on a rampage, destroying all of the Kunnekamun's Avu-Kamuu. Hauenkua barely escapes death as he went out of his Avu-Kamuu, begging for his life and calling her mommy. Eruru looked at the monster's face and remembered that she once met the monster in the forest when she and Aruru are picking herbs. During that time, Aruru also died. Eruru told the monster that she will give herself to him in exchange for reviving Aruru. The monster granted her wish and told her that she will be forever bound to him. Back at the present, the monster revived Aruru again. Aruru opened her eyes and calls the monster, father, meaning its Hakuowlo. Hakuowlo reverted to being human and loses consciousness. Back at the palace, Hakuowlo woke up. He asked Eruru what happened after he loses consciousness. Eruru told him that the enemy retreated and that Aruru is alive and in a good condition. Unable to hold her thoughts about what happened at the battlefield, Eruru went out of Hakuowlo's room. Alone in his room, Hakuowlo asked himself who he is.
23	"Where the Heart Lies"; Transliteration: "Kokoro no arika" (Japanese: 心の在り処)	September 4, 2006
After hearing about their defeat in battle against Tusukuru, Kuuya hold off the invasion for now. Hien told him that they mustn't stop and must continue on unifying all countries so that no one will ever oppose them. Genjimaru told Kuuya to stop invading the other countries because every nation will hate them and that they are only going on a path of destruction. Kuuya denied Genjimaru's suggestion and assured Hien that she vowed to herself that she will unify all countries. After that, Genjimaru followed Dii, a mysterious Onkami who is thought to be dead a long time ago. Dii felt Genjimaru's presence and reminded Genjimaru of the old days, telling him that he is still alive. Furthermore, he told Genjimaru that it is time for them move. Meanwhile at the palace, Hakuowlo is still thinking about what happened at their previous battle because he doesn't recall what happened after he became a monster. Suddenly, he once again remembered a part of his past. In his past, he is confined in his room at some unknown futuristic facility being assisted by Number 3510, a girl who looks like Eruru. At that time, he is already wearing his mask and doesn't have any memories just like he is in the present. Then a hologram of a man called Mizushima appeared to him and calls him Iceman. Mizushima asked if he remembered something especially about his mask. Hakuowlo told him that he is not. Then Mizushima asked him if 3510 is a troubling him. Hakuowlo told him that she isn't and that if there is, he is feeling unpleasant calling her 3510. Mizushima told him that experiments are forbidden to be named according to the rules. He added that if Hakuowlo wants, he can name him since their superiors won't mind if it is him. After a lot of thinking, Hakuowlo named 3510, Mikoto. After that, his recollection had ended. Eruru went to see him to treat his wounds. Eruru told Hakuowlo that treating his wounds reminds her of the first time they meet. Hakuowlo asked if she can stay by his side forever. Eruru can't answer him because she is reminded of the pact she has made with the monster in the forest. At night, Genjimaru and Sakuya went to Hakuowlo's side and asked him to stop Kuuya from continuing on the path of destruction because instead of coexisting with other countries, Kuuya decided to rule over them, making them bear the hate of all countries. Genjimaru also added that he will offer his assistance in leading Hakuowlo's army inside Kunnekamun. Hakuowlo questioned Genjimaru's loyalty to Kuuya. Genjimaru told Hakuowlo that he is doing this, not to betray his master but as a duty of putting his master to the right path. Hakuowlo understood what Genjimaru said to him and accepted him and Sakuya to their side and plan a course of action to stop Kunnekamun. In the meeting room, they decided that they need to unite all the factions that oppose Kunnekamun and that they will need Ulthury and Camyu's father, the high priest (Oruyankuru) to do that. Genjimaru told the high priest is being held at Saharan Island. The next day, Oboro and the others went to rescue the high priest. After everyone said their goodbyes to Oboro and the others, Eruru assisted Yuzuha in her room. Yuzuha felt that Eruru is feeling depressed through Eruru's cold hands. Yuzuha told her that she shouldn't get worried too much and that she can depend on someone who has a warm heart like Hakuowlo to cheer her up at her times of need. Eruru somehow felt relieve and went back to her room. She is visited by Ulthury and told her that she knew what happened to Hakuowlo at their last battle. She told that the monster inside Hakuowlo is their god, Witsalnemitea. Ulthury told her not to worry about being bound in the contract with Witsalnemitea because a contract with a god doesn't bound her from being with others. Eruru thanked Ulthury and she went to see Hakuowlo again. She answered Hakuowlo's question last night and told him that she will always stay by his side. At night, Oboro and the others successfully rescued the high priest. Ulthury and Camyu happily greeted their father. The high priest told Hakuowlo and the others that he is no longer the high priest and declared Ulthury to be the new high priest.
24	"The Passing One"; Transliteration: "Horobi yuku mono" (Japanese: 滅びゆくもの)	September 11, 2006
With the help of the rebels and Genjimaru's military command the Tusukuru empire stops Kunnekamun and soon turns the tables of the war. Dii teleported Hakuowlo, Genjimaru, and Eruru directly at the throne room of the Kunnekamun Palace. Kuuya confronted them. Hakuowlo asked why she is still continuing the invasion when they could co-exist with the other countries. Kuuya replied that her race of Shakukopolu clan can't co-exist with others because her people had enough abuse from other countries and that they could either ruled or be ruled with other countries. Kuuya then went inside her Avu Kammu and started fighting Hakuowlo. With the help of Genjimaru, telling Hakuowlo the Avu Kammu's weak point, Hakuowlo destroys Kuuya's Avu Kammu. Kuuya went out of her Avu Kammu and brought out her dagger to kill Hakuowlo. Hakuowlo knew that Kuuya can't kill and told Kuuya to kill him while she has a chance. Kuuya resolve herself to kill Hakuowlo but she was unable to do it. She asked Hakuowlo if she can trust him and leave her country to him. Hakuowlo accepted her request and Kuuya accepted her defeat. After that, Oboro and the others made it to the palace. Dii along with Hauenkua and Hien in their Avu Kammu appeared in front of them. Dii greeted Hakuowlo and saw that Hakuowlo has chosen Eruru to be bound by him. Hakuowlo asked who Dii is. Ulthury explained to him that Dii is a philosopher of the Onkamiyamukai who went missing a long time ago during his journey. Dii asked Genjimaru why he keeps on resisting him when he is bound to a contract with him. Genjimaru replied that he just wanted to save Kunnekamun from the verge of destruction and told Dii that he is still grateful to him for being bound in a contract with him after he had committed a crime. Genjimaru asked Hauenkua and Hien why they are siding with Dii when being with Dii will only bring them destruction. They replied that they are bound to their contract with him and that he is their true master, not Kuuya who they only think as a decoration. Having no room for reasoning, Dii ordered Hauenkua and Hien to attack. Ulthury told Hakuowlo to there is no need to hold back in releasing his powers because she will teleport everyone outside. Hakuowlo wondered how much Ulthury knows about him. After Ulthury teleported everyone, Hakuowlo is surprised that Genjimaru who is carrying the unconscious Kuuya are still there. Genjimaru told him that he has unfinished business to deal with. Hakuowlo transform in his monster form and fought against Hauenkua and Hien. With his power, he easily killed Hauenkua and Hien. Meanwhile, after witnessing Hakuowlo's battle, Dii told to himself that as Hakuowlo's other half, he cannot fight him and to stand on an equal footing, Dii called Camyu and awaken her daughter, Mutsumi inside Camyu. Mutsumi is the same as Eruru who is also bound herself to their contractor. Then Genjimaru proceeds to asked Dii to allow Kuuya to live and be freed from the contract that her ancestors made to obtain the Avu Kammu in exchange for his life. Dii fulfilled his wish. With the contract fulfilled, Kuuya will be secured with Genjimaru's death. So Genjimaru made a futile resistance against Dii and got torn into pieces by the latter. After that, Kuuya regains consciousness and saw Genjimaru's remains. Dii told her that she is no longer bound to the contract and that she is allowed to live. But since the Genjimaru's sacrifice only applies to Kuuya, Mutsumi burned down Kunnekamun in frustration of leaving Kuuya alive. After that, Dii and Mutsumi flew out of the palace. As the palace burns down, Hakuowlo carried the broken Kuuya outside the palace and meet up with the others.
25	"Traces of the Ancient Dream"; Transliteration: "Taiko no yumeato" (Japanese: 太古の夢跡)	September 18, 2006
After the loss of Kunnekamun, Ulthury told Hakuowlo that Dii and Mutsumi will be in the mausoleum of Onkamiyamukai. Hakuowlo asked Ulthury who he and Dii really are and what have become of Camyu. Ulthury told him that Hakuowlo and Dii each possessed the other half of Witsalnemitea. Furthermore she told Hakuowlo that Camyu is the reincarnation of their ancestor who reincarnates from time to time in order to be with Witsalnemitea. Knowing that they will be facing Camyu in the future, Ulthury asked Hakuowlo to save Camyu. The next day, Hakuowlo called Oboro and asked him to be the next emperor if something happens to him. After that, Eruru called Hakuowlo and told him that Kuuya regained consciousness and wanted to see him. When he arrived in Kuuya's room, he noticed that Kuuya still haven't recovered from her shock at the destruction of her country. Her mind has reverted to her childhood days as a self-defense to escape the heavy burden that the reality has showed her and she can only remember Hakuowlo. Hakuowlo apologized to her for not being able to save her country. At night, Eruru and Aruru went to see Hakuowlo and asked him to come with him to Onkamiyamukai tomorrow as they are bound to serve him according to contract he made with the two. The next day, Oboro and the others waited for Hakuowlo, Eruru, and Aruru at the palace gate. They also asked to come with him. Arriving at the mausoleum of Onkamiyamukai, they were engaged by red slimes and Mutsumi. As he tries to bring back Camyu, Hakuowlo speaks to Mutsumi to come back with them. Mutsumi said that it is impossible because Camyu is just one of her persona. She also said to Hakuowlo that he shouldn't be here because he will remember the truth. After that, Mutsumi went deep within the ruins. While Oboro and the others are fighting against the slimes, Hakuowlo, Eruru, and Aruru went after Mutsumi. Awaiting them there is a blocked path. Mutsumi is on the other side of the blocked path. With Eruru's silver ring hair accessory, the door that blocks their path opens. Seeing what is beyond the door, Hakuowlo once again remembered a part of his memories. At that time, Mizushima told Hakuowlo that his superiors ordered him to put Hakuowlo to cold sleep because they don't have the technology to gain information in his existence. But instead, Mizushima asked Hakuowlo to escape the facility with Mikoto and the other test subjects. Hakuowlo asked Mizushima why he had a sudden change of heart. Mizushima told him that he fears that if he further experiments on the test subjects, it will make him emotionally numb. After that, Hakuowlo and the test subjects have escaped the facility. Back in the present, they saw Mutsumi beyond the door and tried to convince her again. Upon seeing Aruru, Camyu is regaining her consciousness within Mitsumi, recalling the days she spent with Aruru. Then, Dii appeared. He asked Hakuowlo to leave because Hakuowlo has no reason to be in the ruins and since Dii lost his battle after his ace, Kunnekamun's defeat against Hakuowlo, Dii will be sleeping until the time that they could fight each other again. Hakuowlo asked him why he let the people wage war with each other. Dii told him that it is a way to show his love to them because he deemed war necessary in order for the people to progress, sacrificing those who are weak. Hakuowlo didn't like Dii's way of doing things and wanted to settle their fight now. Hakuowlo breaks his contract with Eruru and transform into his monster form. Dii transformed as well. Both Hakuowlo and Dii went outside the ruins. Outside the ruins, Oboro and the others found out about Hakuowlo's true. Then, the battle between two Gods began.
26	"The One Being Sung"; Transliteration: "Utawarerumono" (Japanese: うたわれるもの)	September 25, 2006
While Hakuowlo and Dii are fighting against each other in their monster form, Dii keeps on reminding Hakuowlo of his past. Dii revealed to Hakuowlo his urge of fighting him is because he wanted to become whole after he killed Hakuowlo. Then, Hakuowlo regained the final piece of his memory. In this memory, Hakuowlo and Mikoto have been living together and had a child. Hakuowlo gave his child a ring as a keepsake. The ring is the same hair accessory that Eruru has meaning that Hakuowlo and Mikoto are Eruru and Aruru's ancestor. After that, soldiers from the facility found Hakuowlo, Mikoto, and their child. The soldiers captured them and taken them back at the facility. After regaining consciousness, he saw that he is shackled and back in the facility. Hakuowlo asked the scientist about the whereabouts of Mikoto. The scientist told him that they had Mikoto dissected because Mikoto is the first of the test subjects to bear a child. Furthermore, the scientist showed Hakuowlo a replica of his mask and now that they have him in their hands, they will be able to achieve immortality very soon. With the loss of Mikoto, Hakuowlo had succumbed to his rage, breaking the shackles that binds him, and granted the scientist their wish of becoming immortal by turning them into red slimes, cursing them for eternity. As Hakuowlo continues to rampage, a part of him wanted to stop what he is doing but he can't. As Hakuowlo asks for help, Mutsumi appeared to him and sealed him in the earth, splitting his spirit into two. Back at the present, Hakuowlo regained the rage he felt a long time ago and was able to kill Dii, beheading him. After the battle, Hakuowlo can no longer return to his human form. He also cannot suppress his rage and might attack the others, now that his horrible memories, the source of his rage have returned. He asked Ulthury to seal him. Ulthury feels reluctant of sealing their god. Mutsumi told her that she is not the only one who will bear the sin and so Mutsumi awakens Camyu's persona to help Ulthury in sealing Hakuowlo. After the sisters chanted the seal, Eruru and the others were surrounded by white light. In there, Hakuowlo's spirit appeared to them to say his farewell to each one of them. Before Hakuowlo go, Eruru said her true feelings and confessed her love to Hakuowlo as she told him that she doesn't want him to go and that she loves him. Eruru went and kissed Hakuowlo. As he disappears, Hakuowlo promise Eruru that he will return to them someday. Then, a flash of light shines again and returned everyone back in outside the ruins. After a few months, Oboro became the new emperor of Tusukuru. He went to visit Yuzuha, who have already died, in her grave. He gave her the bell that she likes and told her that he will be going on a journey for a while because he believes that he isn't ready to take the throne and that he needs to learn many things first. Oboro asked Benawi and Kurou to take care of Tusukuru in his absence. Dorī and Gurā went with Oboro in his journey. Karulau and Touka travel together to help people in need. Ulthury performs her task as high priestess. Camyu continues her studies and sometimes neglects it to play with Aruru. Eruru visits villages to give medical aid, telling Hakuowlo that she and everyone will be here to wait for his return.

=== Omake episodes ===
No.	Title	Original release date
1	"Hidden Chimaku"; Transliteration: "Kizuna" (Japanese: 絆)	August 23, 2006
Hakuowlo is working and finds that he is hungry so he sets out to find Eruru, but is unable to locate her. Upon going to the food storage hut, Oboro approaches him and helps him find some food hidden in a secret compartment. Eruru almost catches them and frustratingly remarks how the hidden food was spoiled and leaves. Afterwards, Hakuowlo and Oboro are stricken by serious stomach problems and fight to go to the restroom before the other does. However, the situation is further complicated by Aruru, who has shown up ready to dive headfirst into Hakuowlo.
2	"Eyewitness"; Transliteration: "Mokugeki" (Japanese: 目撃)	December 25, 2006
Munto searches around the castle for Camyu, who has skipped out of her lessons. It is revealed she is playing hide-and-go-seek with Aruru. Hakuowlo watches the entire tableau from his balcony, while drinking tea with Eruru and Benawi. Once Aruru is flushed from her "hiding place" the girls decide to head to the bath house and clean themselves up.
3	"The One Being Broken"; Transliteration: "Kowasareru Mono" (Japanese: こわされるもの)	January 7, 2007
Touka is seen caring for a doll that she treasures. She runs off to get some tea for Hakuowlo, leaving him alone with the doll. Hakuowlo plays with the doll and accidentally breaks it, leading to him running frantically around the castle looking for some way to repair it. He quickly glues it back together, but it's a very sloppy job. Oboro wanders in and starts playing with the already damaged doll, which breaks again. It is at this point that Touka returns, and Hakuowlo lays all the blame on Oboro, leading to him taking the brunt of Touka's fury.
4	"The God Of Nugizono"; Transliteration: "Nuguisomukami" (Japanese: 禍日神 ヌグィソムカミ)	February 21, 2007
Touka's doll from the previous episode is fixed by a merchant in town, but she loses it soon after when she places it on a transport wagon. Touka starts to pursue the wagon, effectively terrifying the drivers into thinking she is a monster that is going to kill them. In the end, one of the men in the wagon throws Touka's doll over a cliff which makes Touka jump after it and fall a vast distance. Later, Eruru recounts the story of the "monster" to Hakuowlo, and Touka is shown lying in bed, injured from the fall.

=== OVA ===
No.	Title	Original release date
1	"The Lullaby of the Watchtower"; Transliteration: "Bōrō no Komoriuta" (Japanese: 望楼の子守唄)	June 26, 2009
It is a peaceful day at the palace. Ulthury found an abandoned baby named Fumirul. Benawi told Kurou to investigate nearby villages to identify Fumirul's parents. Meanwhile, Ulthury takes care of Fumirul. She experienced motherhood while taking care of Fumirul. Karulau warns her not to get too attached to her because it will be hard for her to separate with her when she returns to her family. But day after day, Ulthury keeps on worrying on Fumirul and takes good care of her. Not for long she eventually got attached to her. After a few days of investigation, they found out Fumirul's parents are from conflicting village tribes and she is an unwanted child. But with the influence of the palace, they were able to unite the tribes and Fumirul's parents wanted to have their child back. When Ulthury heard of the news, she ran away with Fumirul. Hakuowlo and the others went looking for her. After they found her, they ask Ulthury to return her. Ulthury refused to give her back. Karulau told her that she is keeping her away from its family and what she is doing is kidnapping. Ulthury still doesn't listen and had a fight with Karulau. Their fight was interrupted when Fumirul cries. Ulthury came into her senses and accepted the fact that she must return Fumirul to her parents. After they returned Fumirul to her parents, Ulthury got depressed and went to drink sake with Karulau.
2	"The Prescription of Secret Love"; Transliteration: "Hiren no Shohōsen" (Japanese: 秘恋の処方箋)	December 23, 2009
Eruru was kidnapped by an Onkami named Nopon and a Kimamau named Gomuta. They asked Eruru to make a medicine that will make someone look young to help their mistress, Kamuchatāru, a bar owner who is in love with a man who likes young women. Kamuchatāru found out that Nopon and Gomuta kidnapped Eruru and told them to return her to the palace. Nopon told Eruru about Kamuchatāru's life and gains Eruru's sympathy, helping them to make the medicine. Eruru asked Nopon about the person Kamuchatāru is in love with. He told Eruru that the man is someone Eruru knows in the palace and told her more and more about him. But before he could tell the man's name, he got interrupted by Kamuchatāru whereas Eruru has already made a conclusion that the man is Benawi. After that, Eruru asked Nopon and Kamuchatāru to get her materials and some ingredients at the palace. Kamuchatāru asked her to stop doing it because helping her will hurt her pride. Then, she told Eruru that she was once a princess of their country, the daughter of Inkara. She got betrayed by the people of their country and sought revenge against their new empire, Tusukuru. She, Nopon, and Gomuta were captured and were supposed to be executed. The man she fell in love pardoned them out of compassion. She told her that she doesn't want to trouble that person anymore. Eruru told Kamuchatāru that she won't stop. Furthermore, she told Kamuchatāru that she mustn't deceive her heart because a medicine for one's heart is better than a medicine for the body. Meanwhile, at the palace, news of Eruru's disappearance has spread. After finding a lead, Benawi told Hakuowlo that he will be handling the case. After gathering the things they need at Eruru's room and were about to return, Nopon and Gomuta were seen by Aruru, Camyu, and Yuzuha. They told them that Eruru is with them and is helping them to make a medicine for their mistress. After that, they successfully return to Kamuchatāru's place. They also brought Aruru along with them to assist Eruru. Back at the palace, Kurou saw Camyu and Yuzuha. He asked Aruru's whereabouts because Camyu and Yuzuha always hangs out with Aruru. They told Kurou that she is with an old man and a kimamau. Knowing that there's only one place where they could find the kimamau, Kurou asked Benawi that he will be handling the case and sets out to Kamuchatāru's place to check Aruru. In there, he had a fight against Nopon and Gomuta. Kamuchatāru stopped their fight. Eruru and Aruru came out of Kamuchatāru's place to tell them that the medicine is complete. Eruru tripped and the medicine fell on Nopon and made him look young instead. After that, Eruru and Aruru returned to the palace. Kamuchatāru and Kurou had a conversation. Kamuchatāru told Kurou how grateful she is to Kurou for taking care of her when she was a child. Kurou went near her and asked why she suddenly brought it up. Kamuchatarou blushed and it is revealed that the man she loves is Kurou. Meanwhile, Eruru never discover who Kamuchatāru really likes and still thinks that Benawi is the person that Kamuchatāru likes and also the man who likes young girls. She began to worry that Benawi might fall in love with Aruru.
3	"The Sword Guard Sound in Deep Mountain"; Transliteration: "Shinzan no Tsubanari" (Japanese: 深山の鍔鳴)	June 23, 2010
Hakuowlo and Touka went to fish and they also brought Aruru and Mukkuru along with them. While fishing, Hakuowlo told Touka, stories about the spirit of the river, who swims in the river in the form of a fish. After a while, Benawi found where they are fishing. Benawi dragged Hakuowlo back to the palace to continue his royal duties. Before he goes, Hakuowlo told Touka to catch the spirit of the river. With that said, Touka waited for the spirit of the river to take her bait. Then suddenly a huge fish grab her bait. Touka pulled her fishing rod as best as she can, struggling against the fish. Aruru got caught in their struggle and fell down in the river. The current dragged Aruru away and got lost. After she saw what happened to Aruru, Touka pulled her fishing rod even harder and finally caught the huge fish. With its size, Touka assumed that it is the spirit of the river. Then, she quickly went to look for Aruru while carrying the fish. Touka searched for Aruru for several hours. It's at night time that she found Aruru sleeping within the forest. Touka camped there for the night and vowed to her sword that she must protect Aruru, grabbing the sword that was supposed to be with her. She remembered that she left her sword with Mukkuru from where she and Hakuowlo went to fish earlier during the day. The huge fish gained consciousness and is going to return to the river. Touka saw it and knock it out again. Touka is surprised that it is still alive after staying at land for several hours, making her believe that the fish is really the spirit of the river. The next day, at the palace, Hakuowlo and the others are having their breakfast. He knew that Touka and Aruru are still catching the spirit of the river but he felt that there is still someone missing on the table. He noticed that Oboro and one of the twins who serve Oboro are gone. He asked one of the twins, Gurā, of their whereabouts. Gurā told him that they are out to search for Touka and Aruru in the forest. Camyu told everyone present at the table that there is a huge monster reported to be seen roaming the forest according to a newspaper and hoped that everyone in the forest are okay. At the forest, it didn't take long for Oboro and Dorī to found Touka and Aruru. Instead of meeting with them, Oboro asked Dorī to observe what they are doing for now. Touka went to fish for breakfast. She went for a dive in the river and miserably fell head first on the shallow river. Oboro laugh at Touka's blunder. In the end Touka failed to get any fish and went back to Aruru. She saw Aruru eating some edible worms in the forest. Aruru gave her one to eat but her appetite can't take it and humorously passed out. After regaining consciousness, she went to gather mushrooms. Pretty sure that the mushrooms she gathered are not poisonous, she ate them. Moments later, she felt the effects of the mushrooms' poison. Aruru quickly searched for an antidote and gave it to her. After that, they are on their way to return home. Touka leads the way and with every obstacle they found, she always fails to get by while Oboro gets to laugh at her. While taking their break, Touka said to Aruru that Aruru seems to be good at adapting in the forest. Aruru told her that she and Eruru were trained by their grandmother because it is necessary for them to gather herbs in the forest. As she got depressed, Touka apologized for being useless. Aruru got up and urged her that they should return to the palace. At night, they are almost out of the forest, when they heard someone screamed. They went to look for the source of the noise. They found Dorī and a huge monster, who Touka believe to be the real spirit of the forest, swallowing Oboro. Touka helped Oboro got out of the monster. After they helped him, Oboro emitted a foul smell that came from the monster. Without her sword, Touka is having a hard time fighting the monster. Mukkuru suddenly appeared and helped them. It gave Touka her sword. Before she attacks, she told to herself that even if the monster is the real spirit of the forest, such malicious being should not be presented to her master, Hakuowlo. In four strikes, Touka defeated the monster. The monster retreated to the river. Touka, Aruru, and the others have finally returned to the palace. Hakuowlo met up with them, relieved to see them okay. Touka reported to him that she failed to catch the spirit of the river and instead present to him the fish that may somehow be also called the spirit of the river. When presented, the fish is still alive and suddenly jumped high, swallowing the stinky Oboro's head humorously.

=== Utawarerumono: The False Faces (2015–2016) ===
No.	Title	Original release date
1	"Curse"; Transliteration: "Tatari" (Japanese: タタリ)	October 3, 2015
A man awakens in the snow with no memory of who he is or where he came from. He is soon after attacked by a large red centipede creature and is chased down a mountain. Just before it catches him, the man falls into a hole where a giant red slime creature resides. When the creature tries to follow him, it is swallowed whole by the red slime. A woman with cat ears and a cat tail throws a flash grenade into the cave and rescues the man from the red slime. She introduces herself as Kuon and takes the man to a nearby village where she is going to deliver medicine. As the man cannot give his name, Kuon names him Haku, mentioning that the name has a long history. Haku helps Kuon with jobs in the village, and is sent to work a broken grindmill. Rather than waste effort grinding grain manually, he fixes the broken water wheel so he can sleep. A man named Ukon discovers he has fixed the grindmill, but Haku asks him not to tell anyone so he won't be requested to do more repair work. Later that night, a group of villagers that have left the village are attacked and killed by an unknown entity.
2	"The Righteous Man"; Transliteration: "Gikyou no Otoko" (Japanese: 義侠の男)	October 10, 2015
Kuon and Ukon enjoy their Amamunii at the inn whilst Haku is astonished at Kuon's insatiable appetite. The inn keeper finds Haku and in return for fixing the watermill, which we learn was a week ago, adds bonus to his pay. Haku's remarkable aptitude is hinted when he correctly calculates his pay without effort surprising the inn keeper and Kuon. Intrigued, Kuon tests Haku's arithmetic abilities which he passes with ease. Thus Kuon concludes that Haku is more suited with tasks involving his mind rather than physical labour. Shortly, the villagers gather around a group of injured field workers who were attacked by insects called Gigiri. Kuon tends to their wounds which catches Ukon's attention. Later, Ukon informs Kuon that he was instructed to get rid of Gigiris by the village elders and invites her to act as a healer in his group. Kuon accepts under the condition that Haku is allowed to tag along. Ukon obliges then the group sets off on their quest. Maroro, a scholar and a noble, is then introduced who is also part of the expedition. Upon arriving at their destination, the group begins laying traps to lure the Gigiris. As swarms of Gigiris fall for the trap, Maroro finishes them off using thaumaturgy (magic). The group then slays the remaining Gigiris when suddenly, a larger Gigiri (Boro-Gigiri) appears and slays one of Ukon's men. The group are forced to retreat as more Gigiris start appearing. With Maroro collapsing in fear and almost killed during the process, Haku pulls him to safety. As the group rests and regroup, they decide the Boro-Gigiri must be slain for the safety of their village. Ukon orders the wounded to return to the village whilst Kuon, Maroro and the reluctant Haku are asked to stay. With no other choice, Haku comes up with a plan to lure the tatari from where he first encountered it in order to use it against the Boro-Gigiri. Although he remains skeptical of his own plan, the effervescent Kuon agrees and sets of to lure the tatari leaving Haku, Ukon and Maroro to lure the Boro-Gigiri. The trio successfully lures the Boro-Gigiri however Ukon is forced to fight it while the helpless Maroro and Haku are forced to watch. With Ukon disarmed and his both hands battling against the monstrous clutches of the Boro-Gigiri's mandibles, Haku remembers the flash bang that Kuon had entrusted to him earlier. He then launches it at the Boro-Gigiri but it fails to activate. Nevertheless, the adept Ukon is able to activate it with his feet and is able free himself as a result. Meanwhile, Kuon is able to lure the tatari and the group is successfully able to force the tatari to devour the Boro-Gigiri. The tatari peacefully retreats, seemingly recognising Haku. The group returns to the village and have a feast celebrating their victory. Then Haku and Ukon pay respect to their fallen comrade.
3	"The Road to the Capital"; Transliteration: "Teito e no Michi" (Japanese: 帝都への道)	October 17, 2015
A hung-over Haku is surprised to find himself talking to an extraordinarily large beast resembling a bird. But the misunderstanding is soon cleared when Ukon welcomes Rurutie, princess of Kujuuri, who was hiding behind the beast, Kokopo, and talking with Haku the entire time. Her motive to visit the village is revealed after Ukon explains to Haku and Kuon that he and his group were tasked to escort Rurutie to the capital, Yamato, and invites the duo to join him. Soon the group, Maroro included, leaves and Kokopo appears to have taken a liking to Haku surprising Rurutie. As night falls, the group sets up camp and as Kuon is about to fetch water inviting Rurutie along, Haku offers help and asks the girls to stay in an attempt to impress them. He soon regrets his short-lived bravado as he struggles to carry the buckets now filled with water. Maroro appears and offers help but to no avail with Kokopo having to save the "damsels" in distress in transporting the buckets. Back at camp, a relaxed Kuon and Rurutie enjoy their hot baths when Kuon notices a presence lurking in the shadows. Immediately, grabbing a wooden bucket, she darts towards the forest and tosses it towards the intruder, whom appears to be in sight, but the projectile is blocked by a tree. In the midst of the commotion, a nonchalant Haku appears in front of a nude Kuon but appears unfazed by the situation while Kuon shudders in embarrassment. The next day, the group continues their journey and Haku notices there are fewer people in it. Then in middle of the road, they encounter a woman whose cart has been stuck in a rut. As the group help her, they are ambushed by bandits whilst the woman, armed with a knife, suddenly points it at towards Ukon's neck whose expression remains relatively calm. Since the group is outnumbered and surrounded, they are forced to surrender. The woman, Nosuri, is applauded by her partners in crime who begin looting the cargos. With ulterior motive, one of the bandits, Mozunu, taunts Rurutie and Kuon but is warned by Nosuri that their deal was to only loot cargos and if breached, their alliance is called off. The bandits leave but the group remains calm, having seemingly anticipated the commotion. As Haku asks Ukon what he plans to do, a cool-headed Ukon admits it was all a plot to capture the bandits while at the meantime, the 'missing bunch' from the group have already started making their move. As the bandits reach their hideout, an optimistic Mozunu, who appears to be the leader of his gang that partnered with Nosuri and her guard, begins to plan their future together to reign terror. However, immediately, Nosuri calls off the alliance along with her guard, having transpired that Ukon's group have used the Trojan Horse strategy to invade the hideout. The guard let loose the cargo and Ukon's men begin flooding the scene. Haku, Kuon, and Maroro stay with Rurutie and Kokopo whilst Ukon leads his group to join the battle to liberate the bandits. As Maroro worries about the safety of his comrades, Rurutie asks Haku how he is able to trust Ukon so easily admitting jealousy. Back at the battlefield, the bandits are easily overwhelmed by the opposition whilst the helpless Mozunu escapes from a secret passage along with two of his men as Nosuri and her guard looks on. Remarkably, the exit of the secret passage appears to be behind where Haku and his group are. Mozunu decides to take the group hostages so that they can escape. With Maroro knocked out from unsuccessfully trying to cast a spell and Kuon and Rurutie apprehended, Mozunu begins taunting Haku. However, his master plan is soon foiled by the enraged Kokopo who forces the three bandits to flee towards an unidentified masked man with a brigade of troops. The masked man, who appears to be the Royal General of the Right called Oshutoru, orders his troops to arrest the bandits then congratulates Haku and Kuon for protecting Rurutie and bids farewell remarking that they will meet at the capital, Yamato, again. After the credits, the group, having regrouped and recuperated, finally arrive at Yamato.
4	"The Imperial Capital"; Transliteration: "Teito" (Japanese: 帝都)	October 24, 2015
A young girl is informed that 'they' have arrived. She then laments how she can't stop worrying about her brother. Meanwhile, at Hakuroukaku, the group enjoy their feast to celebrate their arrival at the capital when the young girl, revealed to be Nekone, gatecrashes the party, who seems to be quite popular with the audience. Nekone approaches Ukon and as she interrogates him, Haku is dumbfounded to find out they are siblings. After the siblings briefly catch up, Ukon suggests it is time to try out the inn's famous baths which electrifies Kuon. At the bath, Nekone questions Kuon's relationship with Ukon whilst Rurutie is happy Kuon considers her as a friend. On the other side of the bath, Ukon asks Haku what he is going to do now that he has reached the capital but Haku is lax about the whole situation and instead jokes if Nekone is really his sister. Then Maroro reveals that Nekone is actually a genius who was refused the title of scholar due to her young age. With the conversations on both sides intensifying, the topic turns to the relationship between Haku and Kuon but the two hints their relationship is platonic with Kuon being nothing more and nothing less of a guardian for Haku. The next morning, Nekone offers to guide Haku, Kuon and Rurutie around the capital. As the group tour the capital, it is revealed Yamato was built by the emperor centuries ago who is still alive and rules the country. The group reach a lively bazaar when all attention turns to the arrival of Oshutoru who appears to have the people of Yamato in his favour. The group then decide it is time to move on to the main event: finding Haku a job since he is living off Kuon ever since they first met. Immediately, Haku is forced to work at a restaurant and, to his dismay, straight away has to deal with rowdy customers. However, Haku is able to keep the customers at bay surprising Nekone. Later on, with Kuon and Rurutie having returned, Haku is confronted by Nekone on how he is able to trusts others so easily; Nekone's solitary past is unveiled with Ukon being the only person beside her the entire time, which explains why she is so affectionate of him. Haku explains to Nekone venturing to the unknown is exciting and that it is a waste to not enjoy it, which coincidentally is exactly what Ukon had told Nekone in the past. Later on at night, having completed his shift, Haku reunites with the group and surprises everyone when he is not able to read an invitation letter sent to him by Ukon. The group accompanies Haku to the meeting point but is surprised to find Oshutoru instead. Oshutoru informs Haku that he wishes to be his patron, on account of Maroro's highest recommendation. He then removes his mask revealing to be Ukon all along with Oshutoru being his actual identity. Haku is unable to respond to what he just witnessed. The episode ends with Kuon, Rurutie and Nekone enjoying the inn's famous bath.
5	"The Pirate Girl"; Transliteration: "Kaizoku Musume" (Japanese: 海賊娘)	October 31, 2015
On a clear bright morning, the people of Yamato gather to watch a parade while the kvetching Haku is tasked to clean gutters with a cheerful Kuon helping beside him. Haku's attention is turned to the sudden appearance of a masked individual, armed with a bow, on a hot pursuit. As Haku questions what he just witnessed, Ukon greets and invites him to his place along with Kuon. They later enjoy their baths and it is revealed Ukon invited the duo earlier in order to bestow them the honour of protecting the capital in his stead. Whilst the inexperienced and laid back Haku wasn't keen on the proposal, Kuon appeared to be rather level-headed and enthusiastic about the whole ordeal, especially when Ukon pulled out a huge pile of cash in an attempt to encourage the duo. Back at the inn, Haku and Kuon go over their first mission which appears to be ordinary tasks involving carpentry, manning stalls and handling cargos. Haku asserts, instead of having to work, they can live off from the cash Ukon had offered to them earlier. However to his dismay, Kuon reveals that it has all been used up in order to establish a base of their operation at the inn. Nekone joins the conversation and supports Kuon's decision by adding that staying at an inn like Hakuroukaku guarantees confidentiality and security but in reality, Haku discovers they are there just for the inn's famous baths. Haku is then given heaps of book in order to learn to read and write and the days pass with him working on his 'missions' by day and studying till late at night. He eventually manages to finish all the study materials and Kuon finally allows him to take a day off. The next day, Kuon is approached by Ukon to discuss an urgent matter meanwhile Haku's day off is interrupted by a mysterious girl who suddenly bumps into him whilst running away from a masked pursuer. Unintentionally, Haku also becomes the target of the pursuer when the girl blatantly affirms her affiliation with Haku who is forced to run away with her as a result. They arrive at an alley and it appears the girl is actually running away from home to live in freedom and that the pursuer was actually sent to retrieve her by her dad. But more importantly, the girl reveals that she is looking to fall in love and forces Haku to assist her. On the other hand, Kuon and Nekone begin to search for a specific person with Rurutie remaining on stand-by at the inn while Haku and the girl begin visiting best spots in the capital for couples. With the sun about to set, Haku and the girl are confronted again by their pursuer but the situation take a turn for the better when Haku jokingly questions the authenticity of the pursuer who refuses to take off his mask and reveal his true intentions for his action. Just then, Kuon and Nekone arrive at the scene which forces the pursuer to take off his mask and reveal his identity as Kiuru, thanks to Nekone's presence. The group return to the inn and Kiuru reveals that he was tasked to find and retrieve the girl, named Atui, who is actually the princess of Shahhoro, by Oshutoru. Later at night, Haku has a drink with Ukon and discuss the character of 'The Righteous Man'. The episode ends with Kiuru and Atui moving in at the inn to help Haku with his 'missions'.
6	"The Master of the Inn"; Transliteration: "Rōkaku no Nushi" (Japanese: 楼閣の主)	November 7, 2015
7	"The Young Princess"; Transliteration: "Osanaki Ojou" (Japanese: 幼き皇女)	November 14, 2015
8	"Imperial Capital Detective Stories"; Transliteration: "Teito Torimonochou" (Japanese: 帝都捕物帳)	November 21, 2015
9	"Messengers from the Land Where Gods Sleep"; Transliteration: "Kami Nemurishi Kuni no Shisha" (Japanese: 神眠りし國の使者)	November 28, 2015
10	"In Love"; Transliteration: "Renbo" (Japanese: 恋慕)	December 5, 2015
11	"The Princess Plays With Fire"; Transliteration: "Ōjo no hiasobi" (Japanese: 皇女の火遊び)	December 12, 2015
12	"Kamunagi of the Chains"; Transliteration: "Kusari no Kamunagi" (Japanese: 鎖の巫)	December 19, 2015
13	"The Eight Pillar Generals"; Transliteration: "Hacchūshō" (Japanese: 八柱将)	January 2, 2016
14	"Master of The Blade"; Transliteration: "Kengō" (Japanese: 剣豪)	January 9, 2016
15	"Masks"; Transliteration: "Akuruka" (Japanese: 仮面)	January 16, 2016
16	"Banquet"; Transliteration: "Utage" (Japanese: 宴)	January 23, 2016
17	"Afterglow"; Transliteration: "Zanshō" (Japanese: 残照)	January 30, 2016
18	"Invasion"; Transliteration: "Shinkō" (Japanese: 侵攻)	February 6, 2016
19	"In Flames"; Transliteration: "Enjō" (Japanese: 炎上)	February 13, 2016
20	"Warrior"; Transliteration: "Bujin" (Japanese: 武人)	February 21, 2016
21	"Death of the Emperor"; Transliteration: "Hōgyo" (Japanese: 崩御)	February 27, 2016
22	"Rescue"; Transliteration: "Kyūshutsu" (Japanese: 救出)	March 5, 2016
23	"Escape"; Transliteration: "Dasshutsu" (Japanese: 脱出)	March 12, 2016
24	"What Makes a Ruler"; Transliteration: "Hashataru Mono" (Japanese: 覇者たるもの)	March 19, 2016
25	"Who Carries on His Will"; Transliteration: "Ishi o Tsugu Mono" (Japanese: 意志を継ぐもの)	March 25, 2016
