= Stepmother's Sin =

2001 eroge and hentai anime

義母 (Gibo)
- Genre: Eroge
- Video game
- Developer: Guilty
- Publisher: Guilty
- Genre: Eroge
- Platform: Windows
- Released: February 9, 2001
- Original video animation
- Directed by: Miyako Mizuno
- Produced by: Kei Miyake
- Written by: Rokurota Makabe
- Music by: Masamichi Amano (credited as Yoshi)
- Studio: Digital Works
- Licensed by: US: Critical Mass
- Released: October 5, 2001 – January 11, 2002
- Episodes: 2

Stepmother's Sin (義母, Gibo; lit. Stepmother) is a 2001 eroge developed by Guilty. Peach Princess published the game in North America.

A hentai OVA was produced by Digital Works and released by JVD months after the game was released. The same plot and characters were used.

== Plot ==
The story starts off with Yusuke's mother slowly stripping off her clothes in front of a middle aged gentleman who quietly observed, showing her naked body to the latter who remained stoic and silent. The scene changes to their foreplay. As she starts to feel anxious, the man reminds her that she is no longer a virgin, and tells her to relax a little more and enjoy the foreplay which she complies.

The scene changes to a sleeping Yusuke having another memory of witnessing his mother's adultery where she is having extremely passionate sex with the mysterious man, telling her sex partner to hurry up and give her an orgasm as her husband is coming back. Yusuke is in the house, and wakes up in shock. After some time, where Yusuke's mother is finally aroused, she gives the mysterious man a blowjob, and he says that she must improve her sucking technique to prevent her husband from cheating on her. They continue to have sex.

Slowly and gradually, the mysterious man inserts his penis into Yusuke's mother's vagina, losing her chastity and having sex with a man for the first time after years. As the man questions her how does it feel to have a man inside her after a long time, she replied that she does not know. He ejaculates inside her, and she enjoys it.

In the present day, Yusuke's father has been transferred to a distant office. Before he left, he married a new wife on paper but not in ceremony; Yusuke now lives only with his stepmother Misako and her daughter Shiina from a previous marriage.

After a brief tryst with his cousin Mio, he contemplates his feelings for his new stepmother and women in general, while remembering the time when he first witnessed his mother's adultery. As he heard his mother moaning, he quietly peeked inside the room and to his heartbreaking shock, despair and dismay, saw his mother having extremely passionate sex with another man. She has absolutely no remorse about cheating on her husband. He continues to watch as they climax.

In his mind, they are all filthy nymphomaniacs; they may act innocent, but they will act like sluts if given the chance. This thought and hatred for his mother consumes him and drives him to exact revenge on womankind through his stepmother.

Misako does little to prove Yusuke's theory wrong as she quickly gives in to Yusuke's devious seductions. Yusuke begins to show his cruelty in their sex, and comes up with more ways to humiliate his stepmother while gratifying his sexual urges.

Meanwhile, Shiina dreams of having sex with her stepbrother. Yusuke rapes her in front of Misako, humiliating them both. Shiina's mother is very aroused and begs Yusuke to have sex with her. Shiina leaves for her grandfather's place but ends up going willingly with three street punks; she lies back as they decide who gets her first thinking only of her mother's actions.

One last tryst with his cousin Mio ends with Mio making Yusuke think about his actions. As he couples later with Misako, he realizes that he still hates his biological mother but has come to love Misako. He begs her forgiveness for his actions but receives a shock. She angrily rebuffs him and says that she does not care about his apology; she has grown to crave the rough sex he provides to the point where she cannot live without it.

Driven to a nervous breakdown, Yusuke runs off realizing that the true monster is not the woman Misako has turned into or women in general; instead, the true monster is himself, the creator of the beast Misako has become. He assaults a couple and ends up crying on a park bench in despair and self-loathing until the police arrest him.

When the police bring him home, they find Misako engaged in an orgy; she sees Yusuke and begs him to come satisfy her needs. The scene shifts to the outside of the home as a struggle is heard and a single shot of the gun is heard as well. It is left up to the viewer to decide which monster Yusuke has shot.

== Main characters ==
=== Yusuke Yagami ===
The main protagonist, Yusuke, is a high student who is traumatized forever after witnessing his mother's adultery during his childhood. Thus, Yusuke held extreme disdain and hatred towards women. Desiring to vent his anger and hatred, he targeted his stepmother Misako abusing her as a sex slave.

=== Mio Shinohara ===
Yuusuke's cousin Mio is a high school student that goes to the same school as him. She is an honor student who enjoys being a class representative. She has a calm, relaxed type of personality. She likes putting up a facade of being a "good girl" while in secret she has a hidden side of hers that loves sex. Unlike Yuusuke, Mio is sympathetic towards her aunt whose neglection by her husband in her marriage lead her to find solace in adultery.

=== Yusuke's mother ===
The main antagonist in the OVA, Yusuke's biological mother, is a beautiful and attractive woman with long wavy brown hair and brown eyes. She possess an extremely voluptuous body with enormous breasts which remains untarnished even after giving birth. According to the OVA, despite her immense beauty, Yusuke's mother was completely neglected by her workaholic husband for several years after their marriage. In an attempt to regain his attention, Yusuke's mother sought the help of another man to teach her how to seduce her husband by learning to have sex in a skillful manner including foreplay techniques such as giving blowjobs, by having sex with her sex teacher. As time passed, however, Yusuke's mother came to enjoy the tremendous sexual pleasure of their lovemaking, becoming a nymphomaniac, and she became a lover with her sex teacher. Yusuke's mother no longer cared about her husband as she had extremely passionate sex with her mentor daily without any remorse for her adultery. During one of her sex sessions, she unknowingly traumatized Yusuke who discovered her adultery by accident.

=== Mysterious gentleman ===
The unnamed lover of Yusuke's mother is depicted as a bespectacled middle-aged man who becomes involved in a romantic relationship with her. He is portrayed as experienced in sexual relationships and provides her with emotional and personal attention. Through their relationship, Yusuke's mother develops strong feelings for him and regards him as a source of companionship. Their relationship also becomes significant because she feels neglected by her husband and finds in her lover the attention and affection she had been lacking in her marriage.

== Anime ==
A hentai OVA adaptation was produced by Digital Works and released by JVD months after the game was released. The same plot and characters were used. The OVA also has an extended scene of Yusuke's mother committing her first adultery and explains her reasons for doing so as well as how Yusuke discovered his mother's adultery. The OVA also features an original ending.
