= Girl Next Door (anime) =

Japanese video game & original video animation (OVA) series

- Artbox of Girl Next Door video game

となりのお姉さん (Tonari no Onee San)
- Genre: Erotic romantic comedy
- Video game
- Developer: Nikukyuu
- Publisher: Nikukyuu
- Genre: Eroge
- Platform: Windows, DVD
- Released: December 11, 1998
- Original video animation
- Directed by: Teruaki Murakami
- Produced by: Chikara Niki; Shiyuuta Biwajima
- Written by: Rokurota Makabe
- Music by: Masamichi Amano (credited as Yoshi)
- Studio: Digital Works
- Released: July 14, 2000 – October 13, 2000
- Episodes: 2

Girl Next Door (Japanese: となりのお姉さん, Hepburn: Tonari no Onee-san) is a Japanese erotic original video animation (OVA) released by Digital Works, based on an eroge video game by Nikukyuu. The story follows Masahiko, a young man haunted by the memory of a woman who once helped him as a child, vowing to remain a virgin until he finds her.

== Synopsis ==
The plot centers on Masahiko, who unexpectedly meets Shu Fong Lee, a temporary student from America studying under his karate-master father. Kyoko Saeki, a family friend, becomes jealous as Fong Lee takes over household duties, but their relationship evolves as Masahiko saves Fong Lee from danger, and they become friends. Masahiko takes up karate, believing Fong Lee is the girl from his memory, but she eventually returns to America. In the second episode, Masahiko's popularity leads to romantic encounters, and the story concludes with a surprising revelation.

== English version ==
An English dubbed version of the OVA is available on DVD, featuring adult film stars like Ron Jeremy. It is accessible on Region 1 DVD.

== Eroge ==
The game adaptation closely mirrors the anime's plot and offers a choice of a single heroine.

== Reception ==
Reviewers had mixed opinions on the series, praising its potential but critiquing its execution. Some appreciated the humor and character designs, recommending it for couples. Others found the character designs stereotypical and enjoyed the comedic elements. The show's softcore nature made it suitable for group viewing.
