= Campus (OVA) =

2001 Japanese eroge and original video animation

- Original video animation
- Directed by: Yoshiki Ozu (1); Haruo Oogawara (2)
- Produced by: Shiyuuta Biwajima; Chikara Niki
- Written by: Rokurouta Makabe
- Music by: Yoshi.Hoka
- Studio: Phoenix Entertainment (Note: Under the brand name YOUC.)
- Released: November 10, 2000 – February 16, 2001
- Episodes: 2

Campus (キャンパス, Kyanpasu) is an eroge and OVA with only two episodes. The whole series features frequent sexual intercourse, oral sex and masturbation and revolves around a college student, Takakage.

== Plot ==
The story opens in Sengoku era Japan. The atmosphere is somewhat weary. The soldiers of a certain clan rest as they prepare for a final battle on the following morning. Genshiro, a soldier (or possibly a samurai as it is shown), is with his girlfriend, Ayame, who fears for his life. He proposes to her, and she accepts. They embrace and make love.

The scene moves to modern day Tokyo, where the protagonist of the story, Takakage Takasaka, wakes up, realizing he has had a wet dream. It confuses him a lot, and he wonders if it was only a dream or that really happened. He has breakfast with his stepsister, Maiko. He tells the story of the day she will join him at the University of the Arts.

They go to school together and are met by Takakage's childhood friend, Mayumi Hiragi, who claims to be able to tell fortunes, and predicts that he is going to fall in love with a very beautiful girl that he is going to meet soon. Then comes the perverted friend of Takakage, Tateno. He tries to flirt with Maiko, who realizes that she had the same sex dream as her brother. Shortly after, Takakage encounters a pretty young girl, Ayame, who looks exactly like the girl in his dreams.

== Characters ==
Takakage is a very nice, easy going guy, who is having sex with every girl. Eventually he got a fortune from his childhood friend Mayumi, that he will fall in love with a beautiful woman. Later on, the fortune comes true and falls in love with Ayame. After her death, his sister tells him that she is the incarnation of Ayame. Then they end up together dating, and having sex. It is also revealed that Maiko is not his sister.

Mayumi is Takakage's childhood friend, and she has a crush on him ever since. She is trying to hide it as much as possible, but later, she cannot resist the temptation and changes her look into an innocent new school girl "Chisato" and she asks him out. Later they have sex in a hotel, but the guilt causes "Chisato" to reveal herself as Mayumi, and express her feelings for him. Takakage turns her down, because he does not see her as his girlfriend.

Maiko is initially introduced as Takakage's sister, who he cares about a lot and feels like his parents rather than his brother. After a while Meiko is starting to have desires of being with her "brother" in the same bed, having sex, but she is afraid she is having dirty thoughts about her brother, but it is later revealed that he is not her brother and she can tell him about her desires and they start dating and have sex in the end.

Ayame is a young priestess who lived in a shrine and is a love interest/wife of Genshiro, a young soldier. She wanted to save him from dying by casting a spell of immortality, but she cast it on herself by mistake and Genshiro died soon after. Due to this spell, she lived over 400 years and after she met Genshiro's reincarnation, Takakage, she falls in love with him. Later on, she decides to reverse immortality spell and live with Takakage in peace, but she dies instead.

Genshiro is a love interest/husband of Ayame. A young soldier, he comes back to the shrine, even though he is fatally injured, to save her from being raped by an enemy soldier, then he collapses from severe blood loss, and dies.

== Media ==
Campus is made up of two episodes, both of which are in one DVD.

== Reception ==
En Hong found that "the first episode is merely a conglomeration of scenes 'thrust' upon each other with a 'loose' plot to 'bind' them together" and that the production values are lacking, but noted that it was effective as a hentai work and "accomplishes what it sets out to do (every girl that makes an appearance)". Chris Beveridge thought that Campus is one of the "simple, but done well" titles from the Vanilla Series line, and pointed out the lack of "non-consensual scenes", not "terribly explicit" sex scenes, and "a focus on dating and romance" to make it recommended for couples' viewing. Alex Roberts characterized Campus as "solid, but unspectacular". Mike Toole called Campus a "filthy" cartoon with "cute" character designs, and "unusual", "surprisingly decent" animation.
