= Deka Wanko =

Japanese manga series

- First tankōbon volume cover

デカワンコ
- Genre: Detective comedy; Suspense
- Manga
- Written by: Kozueko Morimoto
- Published by: Shueisha
- Magazine: You
- Original run: April 1, 2008 – January 15, 2013
- Volumes: 12
- Television drama
- Original network: Nippon TV
- Original run: January 15, 2011 – March 26, 2011
- Episodes: 10
- Live-action television film

Deka Wanko: Chotto Dake Ritānzu
- Original network: Nippon TV
- Released: April 30, 2011
- Live-action television film

Deka Wanko: New Year's Special
- Original network: Nippon TV
- Released: January 7, 2012

Deka Wanko (デカワンコ) is a Japanese manga series written and illustrated by Kozueko Morimoto. It was serialized in Shueisha's josei manga magazine You from April 2008 to January 2013, with its chapters collected in 12 tankōbon volumes. A 10-episode television drama adaptation was broadcast on Nippon TV from January to March 2011, followed by two specials aired in April of that same year and January 2012.

== Premise ==
The series follows the adventures of Ichiko Hanamori, a young woman who, while always dressing in lolita fashion, is also a homicide detective for the Tokyo Metropolitan Police. While inexperienced and often bumbling, she solves crimes using her sense of smell, which surpasses that of the best police dog.

== Media ==
=== Manga ===
Written and illustrated by Kozueko Morimoto, Deka Wanko started in Shueisha's josei manga magazine You on April 1, 2008. The series' latest chapter was published on January 15, 2013, and Morimoto started another series, Kōdai-ke no Hitobito, on February 15 of that same year. The magazine ceased publication on October 15, 2018. Shueisha collected its chapters in 12 tankōbon volumes, released from October 17, 2008, to March 25, 2013.

=== Drama ===
A 10-episode television drama adaptation, starring Mikako Tabe as Ichiko Hanamori ("Wanko"), was broadcast on Nippon TV from January 15 to March 26, 2011. Two specials, Chotto Dake Ritānzu (ちょっとだけリターンズ) and New Year's Special (新春スペシャル, Shinshun Supesharu), aired on April 30, 2011, and January 7, 2012, respectively.
