= Ayatsuji =

Ayatsuji (Japanese: 綾辻 or 絢辻) is a family name in the Japanese language and may refer to:

- Yukito Ayatsuji, a pen name for Naoyuki Uchida (born 1960), a Japanese writer.

Fictional characters:

- Ayase Ayatsuji, one of the supporting characters in the anime/manga Chivalry of a Failed Knight
  - Kaito Ayatsuji, the father of Ayase Ayatsuji, one of the supporting characters in the anime/manga Chivalry of a Failed Knight
- Haruka Ayatsuji, one of the supporting characters in the anime/manga World Trigger
- Kinu Ayatsuji, one of the supporting characters in the anime/manga Sumomomo Momomo
- Tsukasa Ayatsuji, one of the 6 lead female characters of the anime/manga Amagami SS
  - Yukari Ayatsuji, the older sister of Tsukasa Ayatsuji, one of the supporting characters in the anime/manga Amagami SS
