= Kōdai-ke no Hitobito (film) =

2016 Japanese film directed by Masato Hijikata

- Poster

Japanese name
- Kanji: 高台家の人々
- Directed by: Masato Hijikata
- Screenplay by: Arisa Kaneko
- Based on: Kōdai-ke no Hitobito by Kozueko Morimoto
- Starring: Haruka Ayase; Takumi Saito
- Distributed by: Toho
- Release date: June 4, 2016
- Country: Japan
- Language: Japanese

Kōdai-ke no Hitobito (高台家の人々) is a Japanese romantic comedy film directed by Masato Hijikata, written by Arisa Kaneko and starring Haruka Ayase and Takumi Saito. The film is based on the manga series of the same name by Kozueko Morimoto. It was released in Japan by Toho on June 4, 2016.

== Cast ==
- Haruka Ayase as Kie Hirano
- Takumi Saito as Mitsumasa Kōdai
- Kiko Mizuhara as Shigeko Kōdai
- Shōtarō Mamiya as Kazumasa Kōdai
- Mao Daichi as Yūko Kōdai
- Masachika Ichimura as Shigemasa Jr.
- Charlotte Kate Fox
- Takurō Ōno
- Kaho
- Kentaro Sakaguchi
- Muga Tsukaji

== Promotion ==
The film was announced in September 2015. A teaser trailer was released in January 2016.

== Release ==
The film was released on June 4, 2016.
