= Yū Asakawa =

Japanese voice actress (born 1975)

- 浅川 悠
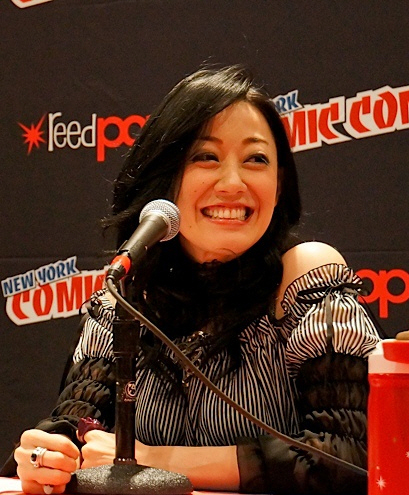
- Yū Asakawa at New York Comic Con in 2012.
- Born: March 20, 1975 (age 51); Tokyo, Japan
- Occupations: Voice actress; Livestreamer
- Years active: 1996–present
- Height: 160 cm (5 ft 3 in)
- Spouse: Showtaro Morikubo (m. 2007; div. 2009)

Twitch information
- Channel: yuu_twitch
- Genres: Gaming; Just Chatting
- Followers: 16.3 thousand

YouTube information
- Channel: @YuuAsakawa320
- Subscribers: 16.4 thousand
- Views: 20.5 thousand
- Last updated: January 15, 2026

Yū Asakawa (Japanese: 浅川 悠, Hepburn: Asakawa Yū; born March 20, 1975) is a Japanese voice actress from Tokyo, Japan. She also provides the voice samples for Crypton Future Media's Vocaloid voice synthesiser software, Megurine Luka. Asakawa is currently a freelance voice actress and was previously attached to Arts Vision (as of October 1, 2014).

She was married to voice actor Showtaro Morikubo from 2007 until their divorce in 2009. She served as co-host of an internet webshow Otaku Verse Zero with Patrick Macias, a previous editor-in-chief of Otaku USA.

She is best known for her role as Rider and her various other incarnations of the character from the Fate franchise.

== Filmography ==
=== Theatrical animation ===
- Cyber Team in Akihabara: 2011 Summer Vacation (1999) as Tsugumi Higashijujo
- Azumanga Daioh: The Animation (2001) as Sakaki
- Hamtaro film series (2001–2004) as Tongari
- RahXephon: Pluralitas Concentio (2003) as Shinobu Miwa
- Mobile Suit Zeta Gundam: A New Translation (2005) as Rosamia Badam
- Hells Angels (2008) as Kuronora
- Fate/stay night: Unlimited Blade Works (2010) as Rider
- K-ON! the Movie (2011) as Norimi Kawaguchi
- Fate/stay night: Heaven's Feel (2017–2020) as Rider
- Detective Conan: The Fist of Blue Sapphire (2019) as Sherilyn Tan

=== Tokusatsu ===
- Tetsuwan Tantei Robotack (1998) as Mimeena
- Chousei Kantai Sazer-X (2005) as Water General Aqual

=== Anime television ===
Year	Title	Role
1997	Those Who Hunt Elves 2	Rena
1997	Chō Mashin Eiyūden Wataru	Mario
1998	Record of Lodoss War: Chronicles of the Heroic Knight	Shiris
1998	Cyberteam in Akihabara	Tsugumi Higashijujo
1998	Bubblegum Crisis: Tokyo 2040	Priscilla S. "Priss" Asagiri
1999	Space Pirate Mito	Shin
1999	Gokudo	Nanya
1999	Shin Hakkenden	Rei
1999	Jibaku-kun	Alibaba
1999	Seraphim Call	Kasumi Kurenai
2000	Boogiepop Phantom	Nagi Kirima
2000	Love Hina	Motoko Aoyama
2000	Vandread	Jura Basil Elden
2000	Shin Getter Robo vs. Neo Getter Robo	Sho
2001	Viper GTS	Carrera
2001	Beyblade	Raju
2001	Immoral Sisters	Rumi Kitazawa
2001	Vandread: The Second Stage	Jura Basil Elden
2001	Gekito! Crush Gear Turbo	Hiroomi Taki
2001	Hikaru no Go	Yūki Mitani
2001	Angel Blade	Nailkaizer
2002	RahXephon	Shinobu Miwa
2002	Love Hina Again	Motoko Aoyama
2002	Azumanga Daioh	Sakaki
2002	Detective Conan	Terumi Hoshino
2003	Crush Gear Nitro	TB
2003	Immoral Sisters 2	Rumi Kitazawa
2003	Kaleido Star	Pamela
2003	Zatch Bell!	Kiyami Tsukishi
2004	Gravion Zwei	Mizuki Tachibana
2004	Kyo kara Maoh!	Berma
2004	Pugyuru	Kanato
2004	Samurai 7	Sanae
2004	DearS	Eiko
2004	Lupin III: Stolen Lupin	Rebecca Lambert
2004	Sweet Valerian	Pop
2004	Detective Conan	Shunya Ogata
2004	School Rumble	Itoko Osakabe
2004	Mobile Suit Gundam Seed Destiny	Krista Awbrooke
2004	Black Jack	Tom
2004	Angel Blade Punish!	Nailkaizer
2005	Starship Operators	Renna Satomi
2005	Buzzer Beater	Lazuli
2005	MÄR	Sarah Band
2005	Tsubasa: RESERVoir CHRoNiCLE	Caldina
2005	Idaten Jump	Whip
2005	Gunparade Orchestra	Momoka Kudou
2005	Perfect Dark Zero	Mayhem
2005	School Rumble: 1st Semester Extra Class	Itoko Osakabe
2006	Brighter than the Dawning Blue	Karen Clavius
2006	Fate/stay night	Rider/Medusa
2006	Kyo no Gononi	Koji Imai
2006	School Rumble: 2nd Semester	Itoko Osakabe
2006	Spider Riders	Beerain
2007	Naruto: Shippuden	Fūka
2007	Fire Emblem: Radiant Dawn	Yeoha
2007	Ikki Tousen: Dragon Destiny	Shiryū Chō'un
2007	Buzzer Beater II	Lazuli
2007	Bamboo Blade	Konishi
2008	Our Home's Fox Deity	Enju
2008	Ikki Tousen: Great Guardians	Shiryū Chō'un
2008	Mission-E	Katsuura Miharu
2010	Chu-Bra!!!	Takatō
2010	The Qwaser of Stigmata	Eva Silver
2010	Ikki Tousen: Xtreme Xecutor	Shiryū Chō'un
2010	K-ON!!	Norimi Kawaguchi
2010	Amagami SS	Hibiki Tsukahara
2011	Rio: Rainbow Gate!	Queen
2011	Freezing	Arnett Macmillan
2011	Nura: Rise of the Yokai Clan: Demon Capital	Jami Yokoshima
2011	Twin Angel: Twinkle Paradise	Ms. Saijō
2011	Manyū Hiken-chō	Mizuki
2011	Carnival Phantasm	Rider
2011	Maji de Watashi ni Koi Shinasai!	Momoyo Kawakami
2012	Amagami SS+	Hibiki Tsukahara
2012	Brave10	Anastasia
2012	Upotte!!	Ms. Fujiko
2012	Tanken Driland	Angela
2012	Aikatsu!	Honoka Tsukikage
2012	Love, Election and Chocolate	Satsuki Shinonome
2013	Senran Kagura	Daidōji
2013	Sasami-san@Ganbaranai	Juju Tsukuyomi
2013	Ore no Imōto ga Konnani Kawaii Wake ga Nai	Misaki Fujima
2013	Arata: The Legend	Osome
2013	Love Lab	Yoshida
2013	Fate/kaleid liner Prisma Illya	Rider
2014	Nobunagun	Isaac Newton/Jess Beckham
2014	The World Is Still Beautiful	Mina
2014	Riddle Story of Devil	Irena
2014	Akame ga Kill!	Leone
2014	Fate/stay night: Unlimited Blade Works	Rider
2015	The Testament of Sister New Devil	Chisato Hasegawa
2015	Minna Atsumare! Falcom Gakuen SC	Ilya Plate
2015	The Testament of Sister New Devil BURST	Chisato Hasegawa
2015	Magical Girl Lyrical Nanoha ViVid	Micaiah Chevelle
2016	Hybrid × Heart Magias Academy Ataraxia	Zelshione
2017	Schoolgirl Strikers Animation Channel	Tierra Sensei
2017	Nora, Princess, and Stray Cat	Shachi Yuuri
2018	Killing Bites	Kaori Rikujō
2018	Today's Menu for the Emiya Family	Rider
2019	Fate/Grand Order - Absolute Demonic Front: Babylonia	Ana, Gorgon
2019	Azur Lane	Ranger
2021	Getter Robo Arc	Sho Tachibana
2022	Shin Ikki Tousen	Shiryū Chō'un
2022	Arknights: Prelude to Dawn	PRTS
2024	Brave Bang Bravern!	Heidemarie Barrow

=== Dubbing ===
Original year	Dub year	Title	Role	Original actor	Notes
1996–2000		Superman: The Animated Series	Talia al Ghul	Olivia Hussey	
2002		Dinosaur Island	Jackie Rodriguez		
2002		Spellbound	April DeGideo	April DeGideo	
2003		The Challenge	Kelly	Sarah Bastian	
2004		D.E.B.S.	Max Brewer	Meagan Good	
2004–2008		The Batman	Dr. Jane "Blaze" Blazedale		
2005		Sky High	Magenta "Maj" Lewis	Kelly Vitz	
2006		All the Boys Love Mandy Lane	Mandy Lane	Amber Heard	
2006		The Flying Scotsman	Katie	Morven Christie	
2006–2008		The Emperor's New School	Malina	Jessica DiCicco	
2007		Chapter 27	Jeri	Ursula Abbott	
2011–2012		Power Rangers Samurai	Dayu	Kate Elliott	

=== Video games ===
- Amagami series as Hibiki Tsukahara
- Maimai series as Otohime
- Summon Night 4 as Aroeri
- Super Robot Wars series as Shou Tachibana, Mizuki Tachibana
- Tokyo Majin Gakuen Denki series as Komaki Sakurai
- White Album 2 as Mari Kazaoka
- Yoake Mae yori Ruriiro na as Karen Clavius
- Galaxy Angel (2000) as Riserva Chianti
- Gunparade Orchestra series (2000) as Momoka Kudou
- Robot Alchemic Drive (2002) as Saki Kyono
- Armored Core 3 (2002) Rain Myers
- Ever 17: The Out of Infinity (2002) as Tsugumi Komachi
- Hikaru no Go: Heian Gensou Ibunroku (2002) as Mitani no Motoyori
- Harukanaru Toki no Naka de series (2002–2003) as Kazuhito, Phantom, Sefuru, Taira no Kiyomori
- Jak II (2003) as Ashelin (Japanese dub)
- Star Ocean: Till the End of Time (2003) as Nel Zelpher
- Muv-Luv: Alternative (2003) as Misae Munakata
- Baten Kaitos: Eternal Wings and the Lost Ocean (2003) Eime
- Demonbane (2003) as Makoto
- Onimusha 3: Demon Siege (2004) as Michelle Aubert
- Fate/stay night (2004) as Rider/Medusa
- Symphonic Rain (2004) as Cordell
- Sudeki (2004) as Rini
- Lovely Idol (2005) as Sayuki Katagiri
- Fate/hollow ataraxia (2005) as Rider/Medusa, Stheno, Euryale
- Fire Emblem: Radiant Dawn (2005) as Rolf, Mia
- D.C. II: Da Capo II (2006) as Maika Mizukoshi
- Dirge of Cerberus: Final Fantasy VII (2006) as Shalua Rui
- Fighting Beauty Wulong (2006) as Lucky Shimoda
- Growlanser: Heritage of War (2006) as Sherrice
- Prism Ark series (2006) as Sister Hell/Theresa
- Twinkle Crusaders (2006) as Riesling Tōyama
- Eternal Sonata (2007) as Rondo
- Luminous Arc (2007) as Mavi
- Kimi ga Aruji de Shitsuji ga Ore de (2007) as Natose
- Ikki Tousen: Shining Dragon (2007) as Shiryū Chō'un
- Kingdom of Paradise (2008) as Yen Lan
- Ikki Tousen: Eloquent Fist (2008) as Shiryū Chō'un
- 11eyes: Tsumi to Batsu to Aganai no Shōjo (2009) as Misuzu Kusakabe
- Final Fantasy XIII series (2009) as Reburo
- Maji de Watashi ni Koi Shinasai! (2009) as Momoyo Kawakami
- Hatsune Miku: Project DIVA (2009) as Luka Megurine
- Wizardry: Labyrinth of Lost Souls (2009) as Odoriasu Ruby Blood
- Alan Wake (2010) as Sarah Breaker
- Ar tonelico Qoga: Knell of Ar Ciel (2010) as Harvestasha
- Future Diary (2010) as Azami Kirisaki/13th
- The Legend of Heroes: Trails from Zero (2010) as Ilya Platiere
- Love, Elections & Chocolate PSP (2010) as Satsuki Shinonome
- Ikki Tousen: Xross Impact (2008) as Shiryū Chō'un
- Senran Kagura series (2011) as Daidōji
- Max Anarchy (2012) as Sasha Ivanov
- Killer Is Dead (2013) as Betty
- Mind Zero (2013) as Reika Kisaki
- Monster Monpiece (2013) as Beauty of the Mask
- Tears to Tiara II: Haō no Matsuei (2013) as Aemiria
- Call of Duty: Advanced Warfare (2014) as Ilona (Japanese dub)
- Freedom Wars (2014) as Natalia "9" Woo
- Granblue Fantasy (2014) as Anthuria, Predator
- Ima Sugu Oniichan ni Imōto da tte Iitai! (2014) as Satsuki Shinonome
- Fate/Grand Order (2015) as Stheno, Euryale, Medusa, Gorgon
- Another Eden (2017) as Radias
- Azur Lane (2017) USS Ranger, ROC Yat Sen
- Path to Nowhere (2022) as Nightingale
- Blue Archive (2024) as Makoto Hanuma
- Wuthering Waves (2024) as Cartethyia/Fleurdelys
