= You (Japanese magazine) =

Japanese josei manga magazine

- Cover of the January 2015 issue featuring Dame na Watashi ni Koishite Kudasai, published on December 15, 2014
- Categories: Josei manga
- Frequency: Semimonthly
- Circulation: 68,333; (January – March 2018)
- First issue: 1982
- Final issue: 2018
- Company: Shueisha
- Country: Japan
- Based in: Tokyo
- Language: Japanese
- Website: you.shueisha.co.jp

You was a Japanese josei manga magazine published by Shueisha. The magazine was established in 1982 and based in Tokyo. The magazine was cancelled in May 2018 due to low readership, making the November 2018 issue the final issue.

== Manga ==
- Riyoko Ikeda
  - Aki no Hana (ended)
  - Mijo Monogatari (ended)
- Noriko Kasuya
  - Watashi wa Shadow (ended)
- Yoko Komori
  - Mermaid Scales and the Town of Sand (ended)
- Kozueko Morimoto
  - Deka Wanko (ended)
  - Gokusen (ended)
  - Kōdai-ke no Hitobito (ended)
- Aya Nakahara
  - Dame na Watashi ni Koishite Kudasai (ended)
  - Dame na Watashi ni Koishite Kudasai R (ended)
- Masako Shitara
  - Mr. Osomatsu (moved to Cookie)
- Hidaka Shoko
  - Mizutama Puzzle (ended)

== See also ==
- Young You
