= Risa Hayamizu =

Japanese voice actress

- 早水 リサ
- Born: February 28, 1975 (age 51); Osaka, Japan
- Occupation: Voice actress

Risa Hayamizu (早水 リサ, Hayamizu Risa; born February 28, 1975) is a Japanese voice actress represented by Arts Vision. Some of her major roles include: Kumiko Yamaguchi in Gokusen, Saori Eguchi in Mirmo, Maya Takahashi in Amagami, Cao Rin Shen in Fighting Beauty Wulong, Maria Momoe in Big Windup!, Ryoku in Lilpri, and Yu and Aoi Kuchiba in The Qwaser of Stigmata.

== Filmography ==
=== Anime ===
List of voice performances in anime
Year	Title	Role	Notes	Source
2002	Pita-Ten	Female student, Koichi, Nurse		
2002	Naruto	Ninja		
2002	GetBackers	Nurse		
2002	Galaxy Angel A	Mysterious girl		
2002	Kiddy Grade	Child		
2003	Machine Robo Rescue	Daichi Hayami		
2003	Kaleido Star	Young Yuri		
2003	Scrapped Princess	Various characters		
2003	Popotan	Girl		
2003	Kaleido Star: New Wings	Girl		
2003	The Galaxy Railways	Operator, Correspondent		
2003–2004	Mirmo!	Saori Eguchi	Main cast in season 2	
2003	R.O.D the TV	Cabin attendant		
2004	Gokusen	Kumiko Yamaguchi		
2004	Hanaukyo Maid Team: La Verite	Announcer		
2004	Burst Angel	Takane Katsu		
2004	Fafner of the Azure	Alber Hidstaff アルベルヒドスタッフ		
2004	Otogi Zoshi	Elder daughter		
2004	Girls Bravo	Schoolgirl, English narrator		
2004	Onmyō Taisenki	Yoo Mei, Souma Asuka, Tomomi		
2004	Rockman EXE Stream	Maid		
2004	Viewtiful Joe	Bienkey Prima ビアンキープリマ		
2004	Desert Punk	Daughter		
2004	Bleach	Kaneda Shonen		
2004	Gundam Seed Destiny	Shin's mother, Neu Kazaefsky		
2004	Gakuen Alice	Elementary school headmistress		
2005	Emma - A Victorian Romance	Kitchen maid		
2005	Glass Mask	Asae Yuuki		
2005	Basilisk	Kagerou		
2005	Honey and Clover	Female Student, Announcer		
2005	D.C.S.S. - Da Capo Second Season -	Student		
2005	Strawberry 100%	Schoolgirl	OVA Ep. "Exodus"	
2005	Fighting Beauty Wulong	Cao Ling Shen		
2005	Black Cat	Child		
2006	Yomigaeru Sora – Rescue Wings	Reporter		
2006	Futari wa Pretty Cure Splash Star	Umpire		
2006	Fighting Beauty Wulong Rebirth	Cao Ling Shen		
2006	Gintama	Matako Kijima		
2006	Inukami!	Housewife		
2006	Nana	Customer, Mother		
2006	Princess Princess	Yutaka Makoto		
2006	Yoshimune	Guy やつ		
2006	Onegai My Melody: KuruKuru Shuffle!	Saori's Mother		
2006	Hime-sama Goyōjin	Sobana's mother		
2006	Jyu-Oh-Sei	Yadou 野童		
2006	Welcome to the NHK	Megumi Kobayashi		
2006	Chokotto Sister	Brother		
2006	Pokémon: Diamond & Pearl	Nozomi, Yuka		
2006	Shōnen Onmyōji	Kouchin		
2006	The Galaxy Railways: Crossroads to Eternity	Misery ミザリー		
2006	Ghost Slayers Ayashi	New construction 新造		
2007	Oh! Edo Rocket	Tenhou		
2007	Big Windup!	Maria Momoe		
2007	Wangan Midnight	Kamiya Eriko 神谷エリコ		
2007	Mokke	Keiko Hiyoshi 日吉啓子		
2008	Aria: The Origination	Anna アンナ		
2008	To Love-Ru	Woman		
2008	Itazura na Kiss	Ishikawa Rimi 石川理美		
2008	The Tower of Druaga: The Aegis of Uruk	Aimei アーメイ		
2008	Kanokon	Yukihana		
2008	Clannad: After Story	Yu's older sister 勇の姉		
2008	Kannagi: Crazy Shrine Maidens	Takako Kimura		
2008	Skip Beat!	Kanae Kotonami		
2008	Mobile Suit Gundam 00	Linda Vashti	season 2	
2009	The Tower of Druaga: The Sword of Uruk	Aimei アーメイ		
2009	Rideback	Yokoyama Misa 横山みさを		
2009	Fullmetal Alchemist: Brotherhood	Woman		
2009	Jewelpet	Minami Asaoka		
2009	Whispered Words	Seki Sekiji 関寺晶		
2009	Tamagotchi!	Oldsense おせんすっち		
2010	The Qwaser of Stigmata	Yū and Aoi Kuchiba		
2010	Big Windup! Summer Tournament Edition	Maria Momoe		
2010	Lilpri	Ryoku		
2010	Rainbow: Nisha Rokubō no Shichinin	Nurse		
2010	Amagami SS	Maya Takahashi	Also SS+ plus in 2012	
2011	Gintama '	Matako Kijima		
2011	Pretty Rhythm Aurora Dream	Kyōko Asechi, Rabit-ch		
2011	Chihayafuru	A poetic grandmother 詩暢の祖母		
2012	Daily Lives of High School Boys	Motohar's older sister モトハルの姉		
2012	Zetman	Akemi Kawakami 川上明美		
2012	Sengoku Collection	Model prisoners 模範囚		
2012	Pretty Rhythm: Dear My Future	Kyōko Asechi, Rabit-ch		
2012	Hidamari Sketch × Honeycomb	Ayano 彩乃		
2012	To Love Ru Darkness	Azenda アゼンダ		
2013	Pretty Rhythm Rainbow Live	Yuriko Fukuhara		
2013	No Matter How I Look at It, It's You Guys' Fault I'm Not Popular!	Tomoko's mother 智子の母		
2014	Riddle Story of Devil	A teacher of Ikuta eye 生田目の恩師		
2014	Mekakucity Actors	Momo's mother		
2014	Encouragement of Climb	Aoi Mai 青羽マイ	season 2	
2014	Wolf Girl and Black Prince	Young Sada 幼い佐田		
2015	Gintama°	Catherine キャサリン		
2015	Gate	Reiko Shirayuri 白百合玲子	2 seasons	
2015	Lance N' Masques	Nakaigi at Takigi Ryokan 鏑木旅館の仲居		
2015	Aria the Scarlet Ammo AA	Mamisu Misuzu 間宮みすず		
2016	The Lost Village	Mother of Mitsuro / grandmother 光宗の母 / 祖母		
2016	Flying Witch	Apricot's mother 杏子の母		
2016	Eyedrops	Potassium L-Aspartate; L－アスパラギン酸カリウム		
2017	ēlDLIVE	Gucci's mother グッチーの母		
2017	Gintama.	Matako Kijima		
2020	Pocket Monsters 2019	Bisces (Visquez)	Ep. 18	

=== Film ===
List of voice performances in film
Year	Title	Role	Notes	Source
2004	Blade of the Phantom Master	Komori Nesa 熱砂蝙蝠		
2007	Detective Conan: Jolly Roger in the Deep Azure	Convenience store clerk		
2010	Gintama: The Movie	Matako Kijima		
2010	Mobile Suit Gundam 00 the Movie: A Wakening of the Trailblazer	Linda Vashti		

=== Video games ===
List of voice performances in video games
Year	Title	Role	Notes	Source
2006	Love Com	Lisa Koizumi	PS1 / PS2	
2006	Princess Princess: After School	Makoto Yutaka	PS1 / PS2	
2007	Magician's Academy	Falce ファルチェ	PS1 / PS2	
2007	Shōnen Onmyōji	Kouchin	PS1 / PS2	
2008	Kanokon	Yukihana	PS1 / PS2	
2008	To Love Ru	Goemonski ゴエモンスキー	DS	
2009	Amagami	Maya Takahashi	PS1 / PS2	
2009	Record of Agarest War Zero	Dana ダーナ	PS3, also Dawn of War in 2010	
2009	Dream Club	Reika	Xbox 360 Also Portable in 2010	
2011	Dream Club Zero	Reika	Xbox 360	
2011	EbiKore+ Amagami	Maya Takahashi	PS2, PSP, also PS Vita port in 2014	
2011	Akiba's Trip	Rei sono Rei 姉小路怜	PSP	
2011	Civilization Opening Horoscope ja:文明開華 葵座異聞録	Princess Hime 甲姫	PSP	
2013	Valhalla Knights 3	Mary マリー	Other	
