= Love, Election and Chocolate =

Japanese adult visual novel

- Original visual novel cover.

恋と選挙とチョコレート (Koi to Senkyo to Chokorēto)
- Video game
- Developer: Sprite (Windows); ASCII Media Works, Fairys (PSP)
- Publisher: Sprite (Windows); Kadokawa Games (PSP)
- Genre: Eroge, Visual novel
- Platform: Windows, PSP
- Released: JP: October 29, 2010 (Windows); JP: September 27, 2012 (PSP)
- Manga
- Written by: Sprite
- Illustrated by: Tōko Kanno
- Published by: ASCII Media Works
- Magazine: Dengeki G's Magazine
- Original run: February 2011 – April 2014
- Volumes: 6
- Manga

Love, Election and Chocolate SLC
- Written by: Sprite
- Illustrated by: Waki Ikawa
- Published by: ASCII Media Works
- Magazine: Dengeki Daioh
- Original run: May 2011 – January 2014
- Volumes: 6
- Anime television series
- Directed by: Tōru Kitahata
- Written by: Katsuhiko Takayama
- Music by: Elements Garden
- Studio: AIC Build
- Licensed by: NA: Sentai Filmworks; UK: MVM Entertainment
- Original network: TBS, BS-TBS
- English network: US: Anime Network
- Original run: July 6, 2012 – September 28, 2012
- Episodes: 12 + OVA
- Light novel

Love, Election and Chocolate a novel
- Written by: Yasuaki Mikami
- Illustrated by: AIC; Naoto Ayano
- Published by: Shogakukan
- Imprint: Gagaga Bunko
- Published: August 21, 2012

Love, Election and Chocolate (恋と選挙とチョコレート, Koi to Senkyo to Chokorēto), abbreviated as Koichoco (恋チョコ), is a Japanese eroge visual novel developed by Sprite, which was released in Japan on October 29, 2010, for Windows PCs and later ported to the PlayStation Portable on September 27, 2012. The gameplay in Love, Election and Chocolate follows a branching plot line, which offers pre-determined scenarios with courses of interaction, and focuses on the appeal of the five female main characters by the player character. There have been two manga adaptations serialized in ASCII Media Works' Dengeki G's Magazine and Dengeki Daioh. A 12-episode anime television series adaptation produced by AIC Build and directed by Tōru Kitahata aired between July and September 2012, with an additional episode released on the series' final Blu-ray Disc and DVD volume in March 2013.

== Gameplay ==
Typical dialogue and narrative in Love, Election and Chocolate depicting the main character Yūki talking to Chisato (left) and Mifuyu.

Love, Election and Chocolate is a romance visual novel in which the player assumes the role of Yuki Ojima. Its gameplay requires little player interaction as much of the game's duration is spent on reading the text that appears on the screen, which represents the story's narrative and dialogue. Love, Election and Chocolate follows a branching plot line with multiple endings, and depending on the decisions that the player makes during the game, the plot will progress in a specific direction.

There are five main plot lines that the player will have the chance to experience, one for each of the heroines in the story. Every so often, the player will come to a point where they are given the chance to choose from multiple options. Text progression pauses at these points until a choice is made. To view all plot lines in their entirety, the player will have to replay the game multiple times and choose different choices to further the plot to an alternate direction. In the eroge versions of the game, there are scenes with sexual CGs depicting Yuki and a given heroine having sex.

== Plot ==
Love, Election and Chocolate follows the protagonist Yūki Ōjima, who attends Takafuji Private Academy (私立高藤学園, Shiritsu Takafuji Gakuen), a large school with over 6,000 students. Yūki is a member of the Food Research Club (食品研究部, Shokuhin kenkyū-bu), abbreviated as FRC or "Shokken" (ショッケン), along with seven others, including his childhood friend Chisato Sumiyoshi. The members leisurely spend their time in the club not doing much activities. When the election of the next student council president comes up, the front runner Satsuki Shinonome proposes that clubs that have no merit should be sorted out and abolished. The Food Research Club seeks advice from the current student council president Yakumo Mōri, who suggests Yūki run in the election as an opposing candidate. Yūki learns about the issues facing the school and decides to run in the election.

== Characters ==
=== Main characters ===
Yūki Ōjima (大島 裕樹, Ōjima Yūki)
Voiced by: Yūichi Nakamura (anime), Yuka Keicho (child)
Yūki is the protagonist of Love, Election and Chocolate and is a second-year student at Takafuji Academy, who lives in an apartment with his mother. His father died when he was a child. He is a member of FRC. He is mostly annoyed when someone reads his last name wrong—Ōshima, and not Ōjima. In the anime, he learns his feelings for Chisato and later becomes her boyfriend.

Chisato Sumiyoshi (住吉 千里, Sumiyoshi Chisato)
Voiced by: Kikyō Kakitsubata (PC game), Eriko Nakamura (PSP game/anime), Hiro Nakajima (child)
Chisato is a second-year student at Takafuji Academy and is Yūki's childhood best friend. She is the president of FRC. She does not like chocolate due to the death of her younger brother, who was fond of chocolate. She later becomes Yuki's girlfriend in the anime, after she realizes her feelings for him and is able to come in terms with her younger brother's death and no longer dislikes chocolate and begins eating them with Yuki.

Isara Aomi (青海 衣更, Aomi Isara)
Voiced by: Mitsu Anzu (PC game), Mai Kadowaki (PSP game/anime)
Isara is a first-year student. She lives with her mother and two younger brothers. She works at a fast food restaurant because her family is poor, and is bullied by the wealthier students constantly, both physically and verbally.

Michiru Morishita (森下 未散, Morishita Michiru)
Voiced by: Asami Imai (credited as Riko Inohara in PC game)
Michiru is a first-year student and Isara's classmate. She is a newcomer who joined FRC just before the student council election. She lives in the student dormitory because her home is far from Takafuji Academy. She is generally very quiet, only speaking a few words to express her thoughts, and almost never smiles. She knows how to play one song on a harmonica her best friend Kana taught her, and came to Takafuji Academy to look for her. She has the ability to see what mood a person is in, ranging from blue (sad), yellow (happy), to purple/black (evil).

Mifuyu Kiba (木場 美冬, Kiba Mifuyu)
Voiced by: Arisu Narusaka (PC game), Kaori Mizuhashi (PSP game/anime)
Mifuyu is a second-year student. She is Yūki's classmate and is a member of FRC. She is actually one year older than Yuki since she had to repeat the same class due to an illness before she saw Yūki for the first time. She is from Hokkaido. Yūki, Chisato and Mifuyu go to school together on foot every morning. A running gag involves Yuki asking Mifuya out, but always turning him down by saying she already found someone special, much to his chagrin, but it is later revealed she is in love with Yuki. However, she holds back from admitting her feelings due to not wanting to risk her friendship with Chisato, wanting her to be happy and she supports her and Yuki being together.

Satsuki Shinonome (東雲 皐月, Shinonome Satsuki)
Voiced by: Sumire Konatsu (PC game), Yū Asakawa (PSP game/anime)
Satsuki is a second-year student. She is in the student council and is the head of the financial affairs department. She is a wise girl and is a strong candidate in the next student council president election. Her family manages a wagashi shop. She goes to school by bicycle. She has a crush on Ōjima and tends to give him made up names. She and Hazuki have a strained relationship because of family issues, but she later understands her after learning the truth about Hazuki's birth.

=== Supporting characters ===
Nozomi Edagawa (枝川 希美, Edagawa Nozomi)
Voiced by: Homi Momoi (PC game), Yuko Gibu (PSP game/anime)
Nozomi is a third-year student and is the former president of FRC. She is younger than Yūki because she had skipped several grades abroad and returned to Japan. She is a genius girl at science and is good at making various inventions. She is a main character in the PSP game. Her nickname is "Non-chan" (のんちゃん).

Oboro Yumeshima (夢島 朧, Yumeshima Oboro)
Voiced by: Megumi Ogata (PC game/PSP game/anime)
Oboro is a first-year student and is the vice-president of FRC. His parent manages a large confectionery company named Umachin. His nickname is "Yume" (ユメ). He tends to sexually harass Yūki, much to his annoyance.

Ai Sarue (猿江 愛, Sarue Ai)
Voiced by: Chiyoko Satō (PC game), Yuka Inokuchi (PSP game/anime)
Ai is a second-year student and a member of FRC. She wears a hair ornament shaped like a carrot. Her family runs a fruit and vegetable store. Kii Monzennaka is her childhood friend.

Kii Monzennaka (門前仲 綺衣, Monzennaka Kii)
Voiced by: Kaoru Tsukishiro (PC game), Ayumi Fujimura (PSP game/anime)
Kii is a second-year student and a member of FRC. She wears a hair ornament shaped like a fish. Her family runs a fish shop. Ai Sarue is her childhood friend.

Hazuki Shinonome (東雲 葉月, Shinonome Hazuki)
Voiced by: Chihaya Sakimine (PC game), Chiemi Ishimatsu (PSP game/anime)
Hazuki is a 23-year-old teacher at Takafuji Academy. She is Satsuki's older sister and is the adviser for FRC. She often drinks beer in the clubroom of FRC. She secretly loves Yuki. She initially believed she was the daughter of her father's first wife, but she later discovers that she is in fact the illegitimate daughter of her father's then-mistress. Her father's first wife later dies and he marries his mistress, who later gives birth to Satsuki. Upon realizing this, Hazuki became depressed and left the family.

Hidaka Shiohama (汐浜 陽高, Shiohama Hidaka)
Voiced by: Suiren (PC game), Asami Sanada (PSP game/anime)
Hidaka is a second-year student. Hidaka's gender is unknown as Hidaka is seen wearing both the male and female school uniforms. Hidaka is a reporter in ASP (Anti Suppression Paper), which is one of the news clubs at Takafuji Academy. It is later revealed that Hidaka is a girl.

Mieru Ariake (有明 美絵瑠, Ariake Mieru)
Voiced by: Yui Sakakibara (PC game/PSP game/anime)
Mieru is a second-year student and is Yuki's classmate. She is the president of FNOS (腐の巣, Fu no Su), a BL-lovers' association at Takafuji Academy.

Reiji Saga (佐賀 玲二, Saga Reiji)
Voiced by: Makuru Shibaki (PC game), Kōji Yusa (PSP game/anime)
Reiji is a second-year student and is Yuki's classmate. He is the president of the Wonder Festival Club (驚嘆祝祭部, Kyōtan-Shukusai-bu), a figurine-lovers' association at Takafuji Academy. There is a propeller on the top of his head. His nickname is "Garage" (ガレージ, Garēji).

Moheiji Tatsumi (辰巳 茂平治, Tatsumi Moheiji)
Voiced by: Uta Kijima (PC game), Takahiro Mizushima (PSP game/anime)
Moheiji is a second-year student. He is in the student council and is the head of the general affairs department. He also is a candidate in the next student council president election. He always wears an odd, henohenomoheji-like mask.

Yakumo Mōri (毛利 夜雲, Mōri Yakumo)
Voiced by: Suzaku Hayato (PC game), Ken'ichi Suzumura (PSP game/anime)
Yakumo is a third-year student and is the student council president at the start of Koichoco. He ran for the presidency on the previous student council election as the head of the Security Affairs department. He is very gentlemanly, but his approval rating has fallen to under 30% due to a scandal called the Ōsawa incident.

Kana Ōgibashi (扇橋 香奈, Ōgibashi Kana)
Voiced by: Mariya Kurata (PC game), Yuka Iguchi (anime)
Kana is Yakumo's friend. She was hit-and-run by someone's car and became unconscious.

Yuina Ōsawa (大沢 ゆいな, Ōsawa Yuina)
Voiced by: Rie Kugimiya (anime)
Ōsawa is a student that is part of the Katahira Faction and the newly appointed Security Affairs Commissioner. She is the one behind the Ōsawa incident (大沢事件, Ōsawa jiken). She is the main antagonist of the series.

=== Guest characters ===
Guest characters from Ima Sugu Oniichan ni Imouto da tte Iitai!

Ayumu Mitani (三谷 歩夢, Mitani Ayumu)
Voiced by: Minori Chihara (anime)

Matsuri Nanase (奈々瀬 奉莉, Nanase Matsuri)
Voiced by: Kanae Itō (anime)

Mao Shigemori (茂森 真央, Shigemori Mao)
Voiced by: Ai Kayano (anime)

Kimika Haida (拝田 希実花, Haida Kimika)
Voiced by: Yōko Hikasa (anime)

== Development and release ==
In November 2009, Sprite was established as a sister brand of the visual novel developing brand Selen. Love, Election and Chocolate is Sprite's debut title. The game's producer was Akira Sakamoto. The scenario was written by Kō Katagi, while art direction and character design was done by Yū Akinashi. The background music was produced by members of Elements Garden, who also produced the theme music with I've Sound. Love, Election and Chocolate was released on October 29, 2010, as a limited-edition version, playable on a Windows PC. A regular edition was released on November 19, 2010. Sprite released a special edition version of the game on December 29, 2011, to commemorate the anime adaptation, which included an art book and a single from I've Sound. A version playable on the PlayStation Portable (PSP) titled Love, Election and Chocolate Portable (恋と選挙とチョコレート ポータブル, Koi to Senkyo to Chocolate Pōtaburu) was released on September 27, 2012, by Kadokawa Games.

At Anime Weekend Atlanta (Awacon) 2022, the game was announced for a future English release by NekoNyan. Mosaic censorship will be retained in their version.

== Adaptations ==
=== Printed media ===
A manga adaptation, illustrated by Tōko Kanno and titled Love, Election and Chocolate (恋と選挙とチョコレート, Koi to Senkyo to Chocolate), was serialized in ASCII Media Works' Dengeki G's Magazine between the February 2011 and April 2014 issues. Six tankōbon volumes were released between July 27, 2011, and May 27, 2014. A second manga, illustrated by Waki Ikawa and titled Love, Election and Chocolate SLC (恋と選挙とチョコレートSLC, Koi to Senkyo to Chocolate SLC; SLC stands for Stay Little Cat), was serialized in ASCII Media Works' Dengeki Daioh between the May 2011 and January 2014 issues. Six volumes for SLC were released between September 27, 2011, and January 27, 2014. Two volumes of a manga anthology titled Love, Elections & Chocolate Comic Anthology were released by Ichijinsha between April and July 2011.

A light novel adaptation titled Love, Election and Chocolate a novel (恋と選挙とチョコレート a novel), written by Yasuaki Mikami and illustrated by AIC and Naoto Ayano, was published on August 21, 2012, by Shogakukan.

=== Internet radio shows ===
An Internet radio show to promote the game titled Koi-Choco Radio! Yumeshima Oboro (Ogata Megumi) no Shokken Ran Yo! ((恋チョコラジオ)夢島朧(おがためぐみ)のショッケン乱YO) broadcast 18 episodes between December 10, 2010, and August 5, 2011. The show was produced by Lantis and was hosted by Megumi Ogata who voices Oboro Yumeshima in Love, Election and Chocolate. The show was revived with the title Koi to Senkyo to Chocolate Radio: Ogata Megumi no Shokken Ran Yo!! (恋と選挙とチョコレート』ラジオ 緒方恵美のショッケン乱YO!!) to promote the anime and had a pre-broadcast on April 13, 2012. The show began regular weekly broadcasting on April 27, 2012, and is produced by the Japanese Internet radio station Hibiki; Ogata is retained as the show's host.

=== Anime ===
A 12-episode anime television series, directed by Tōru Kitahata and produced by AIC Build and Aniplex, aired between July 6 and September 28, 2012, on TBS and BS-TBS. The screenplay was written by Katsuhiko Takayama, and chief animator Hiroaki Gōda based the character design used in the anime on's Yū Akinashi original designs. The anime's music is produced by Elements Garden. The anime was released in seven Blu-ray Disc (BD) and DVD compilation volumes between September 26, 2012, and March 27, 2013. The final BD and DVD volume contained an original video animation episode. Sentai Filmworks has licensed the anime for home video release, and Anime Network streamed the series on their website. The English-language Blu-ray and DVD were released on February 25, 2014.

No.	Title	Original release date
1	"Disbanding the Club!"; Transliteration: "Haibu!" (Japanese: 廃部!)	July 6, 2012
While taking pictures of members of the student council involved in a shady deal, Kana Ōgibashi is run over by a car and has her evidence destroyed. Soon after, the time comes for the student council's elections and the members of the Food Research Club learn that the front runner Satsuki Shinonome proposes that clubs that have no merit should be sorted out and abolished. Fearing of being forced to disband the club, the Food Research Club decide to have one of their own, Yuki Ojima, run in the election.
2	"Running for the Election!"; Transliteration: "Shutsuba!" (Japanese: 出馬!)	July 13, 2012
Yuki's ability to run for student council isn't the only thing on his mind; he is optimistic that the season of love has finally come.
3	"Strategy!"; Transliteration: "Senryaku!" (Japanese: 戦略!)	July 20, 2012
Yuki blazes the campaign trail in order to secure enough votes to win the primary election. Things seem promising when the current president lends his support. Meanwhile, Chisato's jealousy reaches an all time high.
4	"Funding!"; Transliteration: "Shikin!" (Japanese: 資金!)	July 27, 2012
The Food Research Club searches for a way to fund their campaign on making Ōjima the student council president. They decide to sell Ōjima Rolls, and 3,000 Yaoi candy sticks that Oboro's parents' company make and sell. During this time, Ōjima learns more about Shinonome's reasons to become the student council president, and by reading her manifesto, he gets a lead on what he could put up as his own manifesto. Meanwhile, Aomi gets bullied by four of her classmates, which results in them taking her panties off and throwing it in the garbage can. While she searches for her panties, Ōjima passes by her and offers his help, but she strongly declines it. Later, she continues her work on replacing the school's light bulbs, telling her brother to eat without her first.
5	"Festival!"; Transliteration: "Saiten!" (Japanese: 祭典!)	August 17, 2012
The primary election begins, but Yuki isn't the only one competing. A cosplay contest determines who wins a chance to be closer with Yuki.
6	"Ballot Counting!"; Transliteration: "Kaihyō!" (Japanese: 開票!)	August 17, 2012
A slip-up, literally, is the only thing that prevents Yuki from delivering the wrong speech.
7	"Camp!"; Transliteration: "Gasshuku!" (Japanese: 合宿!)	August 24, 2012
Ōjima finds out that even he just made it past the preliminaries; however, now that the preliminaries are over, he needs to claim the swing votes if he's to win the election. Hazuki causes Ōjima more problems when he forced to carry her into the girls' dormitory.
8	"Truth!"; Transliteration: "Shinjitsu!" (Japanese: 真実!)	August 31, 2012
While stuck in the girls' dormitory with Satsuki, Ōjima learns more about her family and her sister, Hazuki.
9	"Accident!"; Transliteration: "Jiko!" (Japanese: 事故!)	September 7, 2012
Ōjima wants to end the discrimination against financial aid students and comes into conflict with Yakumo because it would be an unpopular policy. Ōsawa returns to her position in Security Affairs claiming to be against Ōjima because he isn't likely to be a puppet candidate. A quick glimpse into Chisato's dreams reveals the nightmare she lives with every day.
10	"Complication!"; Transliteration: "Sakusō!" (Japanese: 錯綜!)	September 14, 2012
Ōjima gets hit by a truck but isn't hurt, terrifying those around him, especially Chisato who is devastated by Yuki's close call. Ōjima finds out that Michiru and Kana are both spies of the disciplinary section to help maintain security in the school. Yuki is warned to avoid anti-bullying rhetoric in his campaign. Later, he learns some unsettling and dangerous truths from President Mouri.
11	"Investigation!"; Transliteration: "Sōsaku!" (Japanese: 捜索!)	September 21, 2012
Ōjima learns that the attempted murder of Kana was to hide evidence that she had gathered, and that in order to help her Yakumo put Ōsawa in charge of Public Safety. The Katahira faction is now blackmailing Yakumo to stop all support for Ōjima or they will let Kana die. Ōjima tells Michiru where Kana is and she takes her from the hospital and reminisces with her causing her to wake up from her coma. Still at home, Chisato takes a good look at herself and tries to straighten out her feelings. The episode ends with the Katahira faction attacking Ōjima and Chisato.
12	"Vote!"; Transliteration: "Tōhyō!" (Japanese: 投票!)	September 28, 2012
Yuki awakes after the assault to find Chisato missing. Ōsawa made her move and kidnapped her. She blackmails him and will only let her go if Ōjima drops out of the election. After a wild goose chase around the city, President Mouri unexpectedly comes to his aid, after discovering Ōsawa is the one who ran over Kana. At the end, Ōsawa's plans is foiled and she is arrested for attempted murder and her crimes against the school. Yuki becomes the President and Satsuki becomes the Vice President. Later, Yuki and Chisato visit her brother's grave and the two share a kiss.
13 (OVA)	"Love Sister!"; Transliteration: "Koiimo!" (Japanese: 恋妹!)	March 27, 2013

== Music ==
Love, Election and Chocolate has eight pieces of theme music: one opening theme, one insert song, and six ending themes. The opening theme is "Initiative" by Mami Kawada of I've Sound. The insert song is "Piece of My Heart" by Nami Maisaki of I've Sound. Each heroine has her own ending theme, starting with Chisato's theme "A Little Love Song" by Eriko Nakamura. Isara's theme is "Mitsuba no Clover" (三つ葉のクローバー) by Mai Kadowaki. Michiru's theme is "Kimi no Iro Oshiete" (きみのいろ おしえて) by Asami Imai. Mifuyu's theme is "Kizutsukerareru yori Kizutsukeru Hō ga Itai yo, Nante..." (傷つけられるより傷つけるほうが痛いよ、なんて...) by Kaori Mizuhashi. Satsuki's theme is "Aozora StartingLine" (青空StartingLine) by Yū Asakawa. The main ending theme is "Jewelry Time" by Ceui. An album containing the ending themes titled Chocolate Songs was released on April 27, 2011, by Lantis. The game's original soundtrack was released on May 27, 2011, by Sprite. The opening theme for the PSP version is "Step Ahead" by Annabel.

The anime's opening theme is "Signal Graph" (シグナルグラフ) by Annabel, and the ending theme is "Kaze no Naka no Primrose" (風のなかのプリムローズ; "Primrose in the Wind") by Ceui. The single for "Signal Graph" was released on July 25, 2012, and the single for "Kaze no Naka no Primrose" was released on August 8, 2012. The insert song "Hello Mellow" (ハローメロウ) by Annabel is used in episode one.

== Reception ==
From June to October 2010, Love, Election and Chocolate ranked three times in the top ten in national PC game pre-orders in Japan. The rankings were at No. 9 from June to August, No. 6 from August to September, and No. 3 from September to October. The game ranked four times in the top 50 in terms of national sales of PC games in Japan. The rankings were at No. 1 for October 2010, No. 19 for November 2010, No. 33 for December 2010, and No. 48 for January 2011. The Windows version released to commemorate the anime adaptation ranked at No. 33 in terms of sales in December 2011. The game was the fifth best-selling title on Getchu.com, a major redistributor of visual novel and domestic anime products, for the year of 2010.

In Getchu.com's 2010 game ranking, Love, Election and Chocolate placed 4th in Graphics, 8th in Scenario, 8th in Music, 11th in Movie, and 6th overall. Satsuki Shinonome was voted the 14th best character from games released that year. The PSP version of Love, Election and Chocolate sold 16,743 copies in the week it was released, making it the seventh best selling non-PC game in Japan that week.

== See also ==
- Ao no Kanata no Four Rhythm
