= Love Com =

Japanese manga and anime series

- Seventh tankōbon volume cover, featuring Risa Koizumi (left) and Atsushi Ōtani (right)

ラブ★コン (Rabu★Kon)
- Genre: Romantic comedy
- Manga
- Written by: Aya Nakahara
- Published by: Shueisha
- English publisher: AUS: Madman Entertainment; NA: Viz Media
- Imprint: Margaret Comics
- Magazine: Bessatsu Margaret
- Original run: 11 August 2001 – 11 August 2007
- Volumes: 17
- Video game
- Developer: AQ Interactive
- Genre: Adventure
- Platform: PlayStation 2
- Released: 13 July 2006
- Live-action film
- Directed by: Kitaji Ishikawa
- Studio: Tohokushinsha Film Corporation
- Licensed by: NA: Discotek Media
- Released: 15 July 2006
- Runtime: 100 minutes
- Anime television series
- Directed by: Konosuke Uda
- Produced by: Junko Abe; Hiromi Seki; Yoshiyuki Ikezawa
- Music by: Hironosuke Sato
- Studio: Toei Animation
- Licensed by: NA: Discotek Media
- Original network: TBS, CBC, MBS
- Original run: 7 April 2007 – 29 September 2007
- Episodes: 24
- Manga

Love Com Two
- Written by: Aya Nakahara
- Published by: Shueisha
- Magazine: Deluxe Margaret (2009) (Note: Love Com Deluxe); Betsuma Two (2012) (Note: Love Com Two)
- Original run: 28 April 2009 – 13 July 2012
- Volumes: 1
- icon

Love Com (Japanese: ラブ★コン, Hepburn: Rabu★Kon; stylized as Love★Com, abbreviated for Lovely Complex) is a Japanese romantic comedy manga series written and illustrated by Aya Nakahara. It was published by Shueisha in Bessatsu Margaret from 2001 to 2007, with its chapters collected in 17 tankōbon volumes. The series is about the romance between a tall girl and a short boy who are treated as a comedy duo by their classmates.

The story has been adapted as a live-action film released in 2006, a 24-episode anime television series broadcast in 2007, and an adventure game released for PlayStation 2 released in 2006. Two drama CDs have also been produced. The manga and the live-action film were licensed in North America by Viz Media. The anime series was later licensed by Discotek Media, who also re-licensed the live-action film.

Two spin-off stories, Love Com Deluxe (published in Deluxe Margaret in 2009) and Love Com Two (published in Betsuma Two in 2012), were collected in a single volume in 2012.

In 2004, Love Com received the 49th Shogakukan Manga Award for the shōjo category.

== Plot ==
Love Com is a love story between a boy and girl in Sakai, Osaka. The girl, Risa Koizumi, is 172 centimetres (5 ft 8 in) tall—much taller than the average Japanese girl. The boy, Atsushi Ōtani, is 156 cm (5 ft 1 in)—way below the height of the average Japanese boy. Because of this, the pair are called the "All Hanshin Kyojin" after a popular comedy duo that has a similar height difference.

During summer break, a tall student named Ryouji Suzuki (from another class) shows up and Risa immediately falls for him because he is tall. There is a girl that Atsushi likes as well, so Risa and Atsushi decide to put aside their differences and help each other get their love interests. Their efforts fail spectacularly as Suzuki and the girl whom Ōtani had a crush on, Chiharu Tanaka, end up becoming a couple. All is not lost though, since Risa and Ōtani become close friends. As they get to know each other better, Risa's feelings for Atsushi begin to grow, and her love life gets complicated from there on.

== Characters ==
Risa Koizumi (小泉 リサ, Koizumi Risa)
Portrayed by: Ema Fujisawa
Voiced by: Akemi Okamura (anime), Risa Hayamizu (drama CD, video game) (Japanese); Amber Lee Connors (English)
Standing at 172 centimetres (5 ft 8 in) tall, Risa is taller than average Japanese girls (the average height for a female is 158 cm (5 ft 2 in)). She can be impulsive and is rarely willing to display her softer side. Risa had a crush on Suzuki before he started dating Chiharu.
Atsushi Ōtani (大谷 敦士, Ōtani Atsushi)
Portrayed by: Teppei Koike
Voiced by: Akira Nagata (anime), Takahiro Sakurai (drama CD, video game) (Japanese); Howard Wang (English)
A short boy, standing 156 centimetres (5 ft 1 in). Like Koizumi, Ōtani's surname (roughly, "big valley") is a pun on his diminutive stature. He can be rude and lack thoughts, but is kind at heart. Ironically, Ōtani also happens to be the star player of the school basketball team.
Nobuko Ishihara (石原 信子, Ishihara Nobuko)
Portrayed by: Nami Tamaki
Voiced by: Saori Higashi (Japanese); Hayden Daviau (English)
Fashionable and charming, Nobu is Risa's best friend. She is generally wiser than Risa or Chiharu in the ways of love and always ready to offer her advice. Nobu is usually the one who sets up all the 'alone time' moments with Risa and Ōtani. Following her graduation, she moves to Hokkaido to stay with her grandmother, maintaining a long-distance relationship with Nakao.
Heikichi Nakao (中尾 平吉, Nakao Heikichi)
Portrayed by: Yusuke Yamazaki
Voiced by: Yasuhiko Tokuyama (anime), Kenjiro Tsuda (drama CD, video game) (Japanese); Alejandro Saab (English)
Nobu's boyfriend and Ōtani's best friend. He is considerate, sensitive, mild-mannered, and easygoing. Nakao is absolutely dedicated to Nobu, and when he is not playing basketball with Ōtani, he can usually be found helping with her match-making schemes.
Chiharu Tanaka (田中 千春, Tanaka Chiharu)
Portrayed by: Risa Kudo
Voiced by: Kazuko Kojima (anime), Ai Maeda (drama CD, video game) (Japanese); Sarah Wiedenheft (English)
One of Risa's closest friends, Chiharu has such a shy, demure personality that she fears most boys her own age. She begins a relationship with Ryoji Suzuki during the summer of her freshman year of high school.
Ryoji Suzuki (鈴木 涼二, Suzuki Ryoji)
Portrayed by: Hiro Mizushima
Voiced by: Kenjiro Tsuda (anime), Masaya Onosaka (drama CD, video game) (Japanese); Aaron Dismuke (English)
Suzuki is Chiharu's boyfriend whose cool demeanor is often mistaken for standoffishness, thus has few friends. Oblivious to Risa's crush on him, Suzuki develops feelings for Chiharu, and eventually asks her out.
Haruka Fukagawa (深川 遥, Fukagawa Haruka)
Voiced by: Masaya Onosaka (anime), Ryotaro Okiayu (drama CD) (Japanese); Tom Lafflin (English)
Haruka is a handsome yet effeminate young man who developed a childhood crush on Risa when she defended him from a gang of bullies. He has a tense relationship with Otani, constantly making derogatory comments about his height and considering him unworthy of Risa once he finds out about them.
Mayu Kanzaki (神崎 真由, Kanzaki Mayu)
Portrayed by: Mio Kato
Voiced by: Yuki Matsuoka (Japanese); Elizabeth Quedenfeld (English)
Mayu is Ōtani's ex-girlfriend.
Kuniumi Maitake (舞竹 国海, Maitake Kuniumi)
Portrayed by: Shosuke Tanihara
Voiced by: Junichi Suwabe (Japanese); Gianni Matragrano (English)
Maitake is a student teacher at Risa and Ōtani's school who looks taller than Risa.
Mimi Yoshioka (吉岡 美々, Yoshioka Mimi)
Voiced by: Kae Araki (Japanese); Marissa Lenti (English)
Mimi is Ōtani's next-door neighbor who is in love with Ōtani and brings him milk everyday so he would grow taller someday.
Kazuki Kohori (小堀 和希, Kohori Kazuki)
Voiced by: Hiroki Shimowada (Japanese); Kdin Jenzen (English)
Kazuki is a young student who works part-time with Risa in Ikebe. He is notably shorter than her, but slightly taller than Ōtani (158 cm.).
Seiko Kotobuki (寿 聖子, Kotobuki Seiko)
Voiced by: Fujiko Takimoto (anime), Rika Komatsu (drama CD) (Japanese); Siv Ryan (English)
Seiko is a girl who has a large crush on Ōtani. She is transgender, and states that God placed her in a wrong body. Seiko prefers to be called Seiko instead of Seishiro (birth name) because it sounds more feminine.
Umibōzu (海坊主)
Portrayed by: Susumu Terajima
Voiced by: Smokey Tetsuni, Hisao Egawa (Japanese); Brent Mukai (English)
Umibōzu is a popular rapper whom both Risa and Ōtani are avid fans of, leading to Nobu's suggestion that the duo are compatible. Risa and Ōtani accidentally cross paths with Umibōzu while on a class trip, then learn that he is actually a devoted family man.
Ms. Matsubara (松原さん, Matsubara-san)
Voiced by: Keiko Tsukamoto (Japanese); Natalie Van Sistine (English)
Matsubara is a manager in charge at the restaurant where Risa works. She wears glasses and is quite nosy.
Kiyoji Nakano (中野 清司, Nakano Kiyoji)
Voiced by: Masashi Hirose (Japanese); Marc Swint (English)
Nakano is the homeroom teacher at Risa and Ōtani's class.

== Creation and development ==
According to the afterword of volume 6, Ōtani ("big valley") was going to be named Nakatani ("middle valley"), but Aya Nakahara changed her mind because naka was "too middlin'". Almost all of the characters speak in Kansai dialect.

== Media ==
=== Manga ===
Written and illustrated by Aya Nakahara, Love Com was serialized in Shueisha's shōjo manga magazine Bessatsu Margaret from 11 August 2001 to 13 November 2006. (Note: It was serialized from the September 2001 to the December 2006 issues, released on 11 August 2001 and 13 November 2006, respectively.) Additional chapters, released under the title Love Com Plus (ラブ★コン プラス, Rabu Kon Purasu), were published in the same magazine from 13 March to 12 May 2007; (Note: Published from the April to June 2007 issues, released on 13 March and 12 May 2007, respectively.) a final chapter, released as Love Com Final (ラブ★コン ファイナル, Rabu Kon Fainaru), was published in the same magazine on 11 August of that same year. (Note: Published in the September 2007 issue of the magazine, released on 11 August of that same year.) Shueisha collected its chapters in 17 tankōbon volumes, released from 25 March 2002 to 25 September 2007.

The manga is licensed in English in North America by Viz Media, who published the volumes from 3 July 2007 to 2 March 2010. The Viz edition is licensed for distribution in Australia and New Zealand by Madman Entertainment, which released volume one in May 2008.

The series is also licensed in France by Delcourt, in Italy by Planet Manga, in Mexico by Grupo Editorial Vid, in Spain by Planeta DeAgostini, in Taiwan by Tong Li Publishing, in Hungary by Mangafan, and in Vietnam by TVM Comics.

A spin-off volume, titled Love Com Two, was released on 25 September 2012. It contains the one-shot chapter Love Com Deluxe (published in Deluxe Margaret on 28 March 2009), the three-chapter story Love Com Two (published in Betsuma Two from 12 May to 13 July 2012), and Nakahara's one-shot story Honey Going.

==== Volumes ====
No.	Original release date	Original ISBN	English release date	English ISBN
1	25 March 2002	4-08-847487-2	3 July 2007	978-1-4215-1343-0
2	25 July 2002	4-08-847532-1	4 September 2007	978-1-4215-1344-7
3	25 October 2002	4-08-847563-1	6 November 2007	978-1-4215-1345-4
4	25 February 2003	4-08-847604-2	1 January 2008	978-1-4215-1538-0
5	25 June 2003	4-08-847642-5	4 March 2008	978-1-4215-1738-4
6	24 October 2003	4-08-847676-X	6 May 2008	978-1-4215-1739-1
7	25 February 2004	4-08-847715-4	1 July 2008	978-1-4215-1740-7
8	23 July 2004	4-08-847762-6	2 September 2008	978-1-4215-1741-4
9	25 November 2004	4-08-847802-9	4 November 2008	978-1-4215-1742-1
10	25 March 2005	4-08-847836-3	6 January 2009	978-1-4215-1743-8
11	25 July 2005	4-08-847877-0	3 March 2009	978-1-4215-2369-9
12	22 December 2005	4-08-846017-0	5 May 2009	978-1-4215-2370-5
13	25 April 2006	4-08-846050-2	7 July 2009	978-1-4215-2371-2
14	14 July 2006	4-08-846074-X	1 September 2009	978-1-4215-2372-9
15	25 December 2006	4-08-846124-X	3 November 2009	978-1-4215-2373-6
16	13 March 2007	978-4-08-846148-9	5 January 2010	978-1-4215-2383-5
17	25 September 2007	978-4-08-846215-8	2 March 2010	978-1-4215-3234-9

=== Live-action film ===
Love Com was adapted into a live action film, directed by Kitaji Ishikawa with screenplay by Osamu Suzuki. It starred Ema Fujisawa as Risa Koizumi and Teppei Koike as Atsushi Ōtani. It was released in theaters on 15 July 2006 and on DVD on 1 January 2007.

An English-subtitled DVD was released in North America by Viz Media on 19 February 2008. In January 2024, Discotek Media announced that they had licensed the film, and it is set to be released on Blu-ray in March of the same year.

=== Anime ===
The anime television series was produced by Toei Animation and directed by Konosuke Uda, with music by Hironosuke Sato and character designs by Hideaki Maniwa. The opening theme songs were "Kimi + Boku = Love?" (キミ+ボク=LOVE?) by Tegomass (episodes 1–13) and "Hey! Say!" by Hey! Say! 7 (episodes 14–24); the ending themes were "Kiss: Kaerimichi no Love Song" (キッス〜帰り道のラブソング, Kissu: Kaerimichi no Rabu Songu) by Tegomass (episodes 1–13) and "Bon Bon" by Hey! Say! 7 (episodes 14–24). It was broadcast on TBS, CBC, and MBS from 7 April 2007 to 29 September 2007.

In April 2012, Discotek Media announced that they will distribute the Love Com anime on DVD in North America in one subtitled boxset, which was released on 16 July 2013. In October 2023, Discotek Media announced during a livestream that it will receive an English dub produced by Sound Cadence Studios for the first time, and it was released on Blu-ray on 30 January 2024. The staff for the localization garnered controversy when writer Brendan Blaber wrote on his Patreon account that he hated the original show, criticized its writing and voice acting, and changed the script and character personalities in an attempt to make the show "watchable." He also claimed they re-wrote transphobic parts of the show. Discotek Media stated they would no longer work with Blaber as a result of his admittance of this, though also explained the changes by stating dubs often "punch up the comedy" of anime and that all changes that went through were approved by the show's original producers.

==== Episodes ====
No.	Title	Original air date
1	"Freshman Year Summer! I'll Definitely Find a Boyfriend!"; Transliteration: "Kou-1 no Natsu! Zettai Kareshi, Tsukuttaru wa!" (Japanese: 高1の夏!絶対カレシ、つくったるわ!)	7 April 2007
High school girl Risa Koizumi, who is far taller than average, is friends with high school boy Atsushi Otani, who is far shorter than average, and together are known as All Hanshin Kyojin. Koizumi develops a crush on Ryoji Suzuki. Otani says he will help Koizumi begin a relationship with Suzuki if Koizumi helps him begin a relationship with her friend Chiharu Tanaka. Otani and Koizumi invite Suzuki and Chiharu to the pool along with their other friends Nobuko "Nobu" Ishihara and Heikichi Nakao who are already dating. Otani and Koizumi accidentally spend more time with each other than with their crushes and Suzuki and Chiharu end up developing crushes on each other and begin dating. Otani and Koizumi console each other and attend a summer festival where they challenge each other to find love before the other does.
2	"The Ex-Girlfriend Love Triangle?!"; Transliteration: "Moto Kano to Sankakukankei!?" (Japanese: 元カノと三角関係!?)	14 April 2007
3	"A Guy You Like or a Guy from the Past?"; Transliteration: "Suki na Otoko ka, Mukashi no Otoko ka?" (Japanese: 好きなオトコか、昔のオトコか?)	21 April 2007
4	"Kiss! I've Fallen For You!"; Transliteration: "Chū! Suki ni Natchaimashita!" (Japanese: チュッ!好きになっちゃいました!)	28 April 2007
5	"Send Forbidden Love Flying!"; Transliteration: "Kindan no Ai o Buttobase!" (Japanese: 禁断の愛をぶっ飛ばせ!)	5 May 2007
6	"A Maiden's Determination! Love Love Confession Plan!!"; Transliteration: "Otome no Ichidai Kesshin! Rabu-rabu Kokuhaku Dai Sakusen!!" (Japanese: 乙女の一大決心! ラブラブ告白大作戦!!)	12 May 2007
7	"Sunk! Worst Confession in History"; Transliteration: "Gekichin! Shijō Saitē na Kokuhaku" (Japanese: 撃沈!史上サイテーな告白)	19 May 2007
8	"Comeback Impossible! Major Heartbreak!!"; Transliteration: "Saiki Funō! Dai Shitsuren!!" (Japanese: 再起不能!大失恋!!)	26 May 2007
9	"Resuscitation!! Aim for Girlfriend Status!!"; Transliteration: "Kishikaisei!! Mezase Kanojo no Za!!" (Japanese: 起死回生!!めざせ彼女の座!!)	2 June 2007
10	"A Confrontation with the Ex-Girlfriend?! The Epic Breast-Baring Battle!!"; Transliteration: "Moto Kano to Taiketsu!? Chichi Dashi Daitakusen!!" (Japanese: 元カノと対決!?乳だし大作戦!!)	9 June 2007
11	"Absolute Death! Revived Love with the Ex-Girlfriend?!"; Transliteration: "Zettai Zetsumei! Moto Kano to Fukkatsu Ai?!" (Japanese: 絶対絶命!元カノと復活愛?!)	16 June 2007
12	"Recapture Love! Improve as a Girl with Winning Honmei Chocolate!!"; Transliteration: "Ai o Torimodose! Honmei Choko de Onna o Migaku!!" (Japanese: 愛を取り戻せ!本命チョコで女を磨く!!)	23 June 2007
13	"Heating Up! A First Kiss in His Room?"; Transliteration: "Hatsunetsu! Aitsu no Heya de Fāsuto Kissu?" (Japanese: 発熱!あいつの部屋でファースト·キッス?)	30 June 2007
14	"A Killer Crush on Maity!"; Transliteration: "Maiti ni Kyunshiniya!" (Japanese: マイティにキュン死にや!)	7 July 2007
15	"A Dangerous Man, Maity's Sweet Temptation"; Transliteration: "Kiken na Otoko Maiti no Amai Yūwaku" (Japanese: 危険なオトコ マイティの甘い誘惑)	14 July 2007
16	"Maity's Magic! The Transforming Patterns of Love?!"; Transliteration: "Maiti no Mahō! Hengesuru Renbo Yō!?" (Japanese: マイティの魔法! 変化する恋模様!?)	21 July 2007
17	"Love's Iron Fist! Catch, O Maiden Soul!!"; Transliteration: "Ai no Tekken! Uketomero, Otome Tamashii!!" (Japanese: 愛の鉄拳! 受け止めろ、乙女魂!!)	28 July 2007
18	"The Best Birthday in History"; Transliteration: "Shijō Saikō no Tanjōbi" (Japanese: 史上最高の誕生日)	4 August 2007
19	"Sudden Downturn!! The First Date Is the Beginning of Disaster"; Transliteration: "Kyūten Chokka!! Hatsu Dēto wa Fumei no Hajimari" (Japanese: 急転直下!!初デートは不運の始まり)	11 August 2007
They go on their first date and are embarrassed in a stadium. She starts to have second doubts after he bumps into her ex-girlfriend attending the same event but they gently reaffirm their love. In the end, she meets her rival, the next door neighbor idol!
20	"Declaration of War!! The Dangerous Beauty Burns with Envy!!"; Transliteration: "Sensen Fukoku! Shitto ni Moeru Denjarasu Bishōjo!!" (Japanese: 宣戦布告!!嫉妬に燃えるデンジャラス美少女!!)	18 August 2007
21	"Premonition of Separation?! Risa and Ōtani Walk Separate Paths"; Transliteration: "Wakare no Yokan?! Risa to Ōtani ga Ayumu Betsubetsu no Michi" (Japanese: 別れの予感?!リサと大谷が歩む別々の道)	8 September 2007
22	"A Catastrophic Declaration from Ōtani!!"; Transliteration: "Ōtani kara no Hakyoku Sengen!!" (Japanese: 大谷からの破局宣言!!)	22 September 2007
23	"Various Paths!! Everyone Embraces Their Own Circumstances"; Transliteration: "Shinro wa Iroiro!! Minna ga Kakaeru Sorezore no Jiko" (Japanese: 進路はいろいろ!!みんなが抱えるそれぞれの事故)	22 September 2007
24	"Together Forever"; Transliteration: "Zutto Issho!!" (Japanese: ずっと一緒!!)	29 September 2007

== Reception ==
Love Com won the 49th Shogakukan Manga Award for the shōjo category. The English edition of Love Com has been favorably reviewed, with praise especially for Nakahara's comedic timing, sympathetic characters, and deft depictions of emotions. A reviewer at Anime News Network praised it as "the standard by which all other modern romantic comedies should be measured" for its handling of the range of its characters' emotions. The first volume was named by the Young Adult Library Services Association as among the best graphic novels for teens for 2007.

The live-action film of Love Com was named by Young Adult Library Services Association as one of 16 films that are 2009 Fabulous Films for Young Adults on the theme of coming of age around the world.
