= Ashi-Girl =

Japanese manga series

- First tankōbon volume cover

アシガール (Ashigāru)
- Genre: Historical; Romantic comedy; Science fiction
- Manga
- Written by: Kozueko Morimoto
- Published by: Shueisha
- Imprint: Margaret Comics
- Magazine: Cocohana
- Original run: November 28, 2011 – December 27, 2021
- Volumes: 16
- Television drama
- Original network: NHK
- Original run: September 23, 2017 – December 16, 2017
- Episodes: 12
- Live-action television film

Ashi Girl SP: Chō Jikū Rabukome Futatabi
- Released: December 24, 2018
- Manga

Tama no Koshi Ire: Ashi-Girl Season 2
- Written by: Kozueko Morimoto
- Published by: Shueisha
- Imprint: Margaret Comics
- Magazine: Cocohana
- Original run: February 28, 2023 – present
- Volumes: 5

Ashi-Girl (アシガール, Ashigāru) is a Japanese manga series written and illustrated by Kozueko Morimoto. It was serialized in Shueisha's josei manga magazine Cocohana from November 2011 to December 2021. A live-action television drama adaptation aired from September to December 2017.

== Synopsis ==
Yui Hayakawa is a lazy, underperforming student whose only talent is her leg strength. One day, she suddenly gets transported in time to the Sengoku period due to accidentally falling in her brother Takeru's time machine.

== Media ==
=== Manga ===
Written and illustrated by Kozueko Morimoto, Ashi-Girl began serialization in the first-ever issue of Shueisha's Cocohana josei manga magazine released on November 28, 2011. It ended serialization on December 27, 2021. The series' chapters were collected into sixteen tankōbon volumes from July 25, 2012, to February 25, 2022.

A sequel manga titled, Tama ni Koshi Ire: Ashi-Girl Season 2 began serialization in the same magazine on February 28, 2023. The sequel's chapters have been collected into five tankōbon volumes as of July 23, 2026.

==== Volumes ====
No.	Release date	ISBN
1	July 25, 2012	978-4-08-846807-5
2	February 25, 2013	978-4-08-845003-2
3	October 25, 2013	978-4-08-845117-6
4	May 23, 2014	978-4-08-845218-0
5	January 23, 2015	978-4-08-845338-5
6	August 25, 2015	978-4-08-845436-8
7	April 25, 2016	978-4-08-845558-7
8	December 22, 2016	978-4-08-845689-8
9	September 25, 2017	978-4-08-845814-4
10	April 25, 2018	978-4-08-844029-3
11	August 24, 2018	978-4-08-844089-7
12	February 25, 2019	978-4-08-844175-7
13	September 25, 2019	978-4-08-844249-5
14	April 24, 2020	978-4-08-844331-7
15	December 24, 2020	978-4-08-844433-8
16	February 25, 2022	978-4-08-844518-2

==== Tama no Koshi Ire: Ashi-Girl Season 2 ====
No.	Release date	ISBN
1	October 25, 2023	978-4-08-844840-4
2	June 25, 2024	978-4-08-843026-3
3	February 25, 2025	978-4-08-843108-6
4	October 24, 2025	978-4-08-843191-8
5	July 24, 2026	978-4-08-843283-0

=== Drama ===
A 12-episode live-action television drama adaptation was announced on May 17, 2017. The drama aired on NHK from September 23 to December 16, 2017. The series starred Yuina Kuroshima as Yui Hayakawa and Kentarō as Tadakiyo Hagikuhachirō.

A sequel television special was announced in February 2018. The special premiered on NHK on December 24, 2018.

=== Other media ===
A musical stage reading adaptation was announced on June 28, 2023. Three performances were held at the TOYUSU PIT Theatre in Tokyo between August 5–6, 2023. The reading featured the performances of Miyu Honda and Ayako Konno as Yui Hayakawa, Toshiki Masuda, Miku Fukahori, and Takuya Kusakawa as Tadakiyo Hagikuhachirō, Hiromu Mineta, Yuuki Shin and Shūichirō Umeda as Takeru Hayakawa, Yuka Ozaki and Makoto Koichi as Ako Matsumaru, and Kentarō Kumagai, Seiichiro Yamashita and Tatsumaru Tachibana as Nariyuki Hagi.

== Reception ==
By February 2022, the series had 4 million copies in circulation.

== See also ==
- Gokusen, another manga series by Kozueko Morimoto
- Kōdai-ke no Hitobito, another manga series by Kozueko Morimoto
