= Berry Dynamite =

Japanese manga series

- First tankōbon volume cover

ベリーダイナマイト (Berī Dainamaito)
- Genre: Comedy
- Manga
- Written by: Aya Nakahara
- Published by: Shueisha
- Imprint: Margaret Comics
- Magazine: Bessatsu Margaret
- Original run: May 13, 2009 – March 13, 2010
- Volumes: 3

Berry Dynamite (Japanese: ベリーダイナマイト, Hepburn: Berī Dainamaito) is a Japanese comedy manga series written and illustrated by Aya Nakahara. It was serialized in Shueisha's shōjo manga magazine Bessatsu Margaret from May 2009 to March 2010, with its chapters collected into three tankōbon volumes.

== Characters ==
Mai Amane (天音 麻衣, Amane Mai)
Misora Kurumi (みそら くるみ, Kurumi Misora)

== Publication ==
Written and illustrated by Aya Nakahara, Berry Dynamite was serialized in Shueisha's Bessatsu Margaret magazine from May 13, 2009, to March 13, 2010. Three tankōbon volumes have been released from October 2009 to May 2010.

The series was published in French by Delcourt.

=== Volume list ===
No.	Japanese release date	Japanese ISBN
1	October 23, 2009	978-4-08-846456-5
2	December 25, 2009	978-4-08-846477-0
3	May 25, 2010	978-4-08-846528-9

== Reception ==
On manga-news.com, the series has a staff grade of 16 out of 20. On Manga Sanctuary, the series has a staff grade of 5.5 out of 10 from two staff members. On planetebd.com, Faustine Lillaz gave all three volumes a grade of "good, nice". On bdzoom.com, Gwenaël Jacquet said the "heroines are dynamic" and "the story is catching". On Anime News Network, Rebecca Silverman called it "a delight of a series, laugh-out-loud funny in places".
