= Mermaid Scales and the Town of Sand =

Japanese manga series by Yoko Komori

- First tankōbon volume cover

青い鱗と砂の街 (Aoi Uroko to Suna no Machi)
- Genre: Fantasy
- Manga
- Written by: Yoko Komori
- Published by: Shueisha
- English publisher: NA: Viz Media
- Magazine: You
- Original run: March 15, 2013 – January 15, 2014
- Volumes: 2
- icon

Mermaid Scales and the Town of Sand (Japanese: 青い鱗と砂の街, Hepburn: Aoi Uroko to Suna no Machi) is a Japanese manga series written and illustrated by Yoko Komori. It was serialized in Shueisha's josei manga magazine You, with its chapters collected in two tankōbon volumes.

== Publication ==
Written and illustrated by Yoko Komori, Mermaid Scales and the Town of Sand was serialized in Shueisha's josei manga magazine You from March 15, 2013, to January 15, 2014. Shueisha collected its chapters in two tankōbon volumes, released on August 23, 2013, and February 25, 2014.

In North America, the manga was licensed for English release by Viz Media. It released the series in a single volume on February 21, 2023.
