= Ima Sugu Oniichan ni Imōto da tte Iitai! =

Japanese visual novel

- The cover art of the game.

いますぐお兄ちゃんに妹だっていいたい!
- Genre: Romance
- Video game
- Developer: Fairys
- Publisher: Fairys, Sprite
- Genre: Visual novel
- Platform: Windows, PlayStation Vita
- Released: Windows; JP: December 14, 2012; PlayStation Vita; JP: April 24, 2014
- Manga
- Written by: Fairys
- Illustrated by: Masaru Oda
- Published by: ASCII Media Works
- Magazine: Dengeki Daioh
- Original run: November 2012 – February 2014
- Volumes: 2

Ima Sugu Oniichan ni Imōto da tte Iitai! (いますぐお兄ちゃんに妹だっていいたい!; lit. I Want to Say to my Older Brother That I'm His Younger Sister Now!), also known as Imaimo (いま妹) for short, with the tagline "I wanna say that I'm not your brother right now!", is a Japanese visual novel developed by Fairys, a sister brand of Sprite, the creators of Love, Elections & Chocolate. It was released on December 14, 2012, playable on Windows PCs and is rated all ages. The game takes place before the events of Love, Elections & Chocolate, and features two of the heroines from that game: Chisato Sumiyoshi and Satsuki Shinonome. The story revolves around the protagonist Rikuto Mitani, whose father remarried a woman who already has a daughter. There is a manga adaptation of the game published in Dengeki Daioh. Imaimo and Love, Elections & Chocolate were both featured at the 2012 Anime Contents Expo. A PlayStation Vita version was released in Japan on 24 April 2014.

== Characters ==
=== Year 1 Class 8 ===
Kanade Mori (森 夏奏, Mori Kanade)
Voiced by: Yūko Gibu
She is the homeroom teacher in charge of Year 1 Class 8 at Asaoka Academy.
Kimika Haida (拝田 希実花, Haida Kimika)
Voiced by: Yōko Hikasa
She is Rikuto's classmate and Class 8's chairman as of chapter 6 in the manga. She is a timid and quiet girl. The first time spoke loud and clearly is in chapter 16 in the manga. She attends the same class as Rikuto. She was originally a supporting character.
Rikuto Mitani (三谷 陸斗, Mitani Rikuto)
Voiced by: Nobunaga Shimazaki
He is the protagonist who attends Asaoka Academy as a first year. He is Class 8's vice chairman as of chapter 6 in the manga. He fell in love with Ayumu in her female form without knowing who she is. Rikuto had his doubts when it comes to knowing Ayumu's true gender, so it wasn't until chapter 11 that his thoughts were confirmed. At first, he didn't accept having a new family but then he gradually accepted them. He didn't call Ryouko "mom" because he thinks he need just one mom. He would not let Ryouko cook his favorite meal, oyakodon, because that is what his deceased mother used to make. He eventually let Ryouko cook him some oyakodon. He finally calls Ryouko "mom" in chapter 16 of the manga. He crushed Ryuugo at soccer in middle school when he was ace. Since then, Ryuugo tried to get him to join the soccer club, although Rikuto said it was a one time coincidence. He carries a wristwatch but because it is for girls, he carries it on his belt (It is a memento from his deceased mother.). After what happened to his father, he swore never to forgive anyone who would steal someone else's happiness. He and Ayumu finally confessed their feelings for one another, not as brother and sister, but as boy and girl. Then they became a couple. He does not remember but he met Ayumu when they were only three years old.

==== Year 1 Class 8's Event Executive Committee ====
Ayumu Mitani (三谷 歩夢, Mitani Ayumu)
Voiced by: Minori Chihara
She is Rikuto's step-sister. Due to her mother, she always dresses like a boy at home. When she is at school, she wears a female uniform. She attends the same class as Rikuto. When she was younger, she always wanted a kind older brother. When she sleeps, she dreams of a kind older brother spoiling her. That was her first love. She and Rikuto finally confessed their feelings for one another, not as brother and sister, but as boy and girl. Then they became a couple. She doesn't remember but she met Rikuto when they were only three years old. The older brother in her dream is actually Rikuto.
Matsuri Nanase (奈々瀬 奉莉, Nanase Matsuri)
Voiced by: Kanae Itō
Nanase has been Rikuto's "ally" since they were in middle school. She attends the same class as Rikuto. She knows Ayumu's real gender. She is very popular amongst boys and gets confessed to a lot, even though she rejects them just as much.
Mao Shigemori (茂森 真央, Shigemori Mao)
Voiced by: Ai Kayano
Due to her grandfather, she wears a male uniform at school, and because of this, she is popular among the female students. She even wears male underwear. She attends the same class as Rikuto. She likes cute things.
Shōsuke Yokoyama (横山 章介, Yokoyama Shōsuke)
Voiced by: Yoshitsugu Matsuoka
He is Rikuto's classmate. He likes to act like a gentleman.

=== Supporting characters ===
Naoma Mitani (三谷 直真, Mitani Naoma)
Voiced by: Kazuya Nakai
He is Rikuto's father. He only lets Ryouko call him Nao-tan. He works as a chief at a store he owns. Rikuto and his friends sometimes visit. Because he can't wear a ring at work, he wears a wristwatch, same one Ikumi wore, instead. He took off his "ring" in chapter 14, saying that he has moved on and Rikuto should too. When Rikuto was very young, he let an old friend take care of the expenses in the "new" store. Then he lost contact with his friend and never saw him since. With most of the money gone, he couldn't pay for Ikumi's surgery that she really needed and died.
Ikumi Mitani (三谷 直真, Mitani Ikumi)
She is Rikuto's deceased mother. She died when he was very young. Rikuto has her wristwatch, which was used as a wedding ring.
Ryouko Mitani (三谷 良子, Mitani Ryōko) (Maiden Name Tsunoda)
Voiced by: Yui Horie
She is Ayumu's mother. She is a 35-year-old professional make-up artist who looks ten years younger.
Miku Kanzaki (神崎 未玖, Kanzaki Miku)
Voiced by: Ayana Taketatsu
She is a 12-year-old girl who lives next door to the Mitani family's apartment.
Ryuugo Kobayashi (小林 琉伍, Kobayashi Ryūgo)
Voiced by: Megumi Ogata
He is the sophomore of Asaoka Academy and the ace striker of soccer club. He and Rikuto were senior and junior since middle school.
Chisato Sumiyoshi (住吉 千里, Sumiyoshi Chisato)
Voiced by: Eriko Nakamura
She is Ayumu's cousin. She is originally from Love, Elections & Chocolate.
Satsuki Shinonome (東雲 皐月, Shinonome Satsuki)
Voiced by: Yū Asakawa
She is Matsuri's childhood friend. She is originally from Love, Elections & Chocolate.
Kōzō Shigemori (茂森 鋼造, Shigemori Kōzō)
Voiced by: Yōsuke Akimoto
He is Mao's father.

== Development ==
In an interview with ASCII Media Works, the game's producer Akira Sakamoto said that there had been requests from "young users" for all ages games, so Imaimo was made to respond to that "new challenge". He also said that the game's title is meant to express the feelings of the heroine in the second half of the story. The character designer and artist is Yū Akinashi, the music is by Elements Garden, the music producer Shigeru Saitō, and the script is by Kō Katagi.

== Reception ==
The PlayStation Vita version of the game received a total score of 27/40 by Famitsu. It was the 574th best selling video game of the year in Japan in 2014, with 6,068 units sold.
