= Hiromi Konno =

Japanese voice actress and narrator (born 1975)

- 今野 宏美
- Born: September 13, 1975 (age 50); Hokkaido, Japan
- Education: Sapporo University
- Occupations: Voice actress; narrator
- Years active: 1997–present
- Agent: Aoni Production
- Height: 152 cm (5 ft 0 in)

Hiromi Konno (今野 宏美, Konno Hiromi; born September 13, 1975) is a Japanese voice actress and narrator from Hokkaido. She graduated from Faculty of Economics at Sapporo University. After leaving Marcus and Aoni-juku she is now affiliated with Aoni Production.

== Filmography ==
=== Anime ===
1998

- El-Hazard (1998)
- Sentimental Journey - Rurika Yamamoto

2000

- Mushrambo - Kuro (Ep. 23)

2001

- Prétear - B-ko (Ep. 1)
- Bakuten Shoot Beyblade - Bijo A (Ep. 24); Girl (Ep. 16)
- Mamimume Mogacho - Go-gan; Kiiko
- Aquarian Age: Sign for Evolution - Girl A

2002

- Kikō Sennyo Rōran - Rōran
- SaiKano - Rie

2003

- Bakuten Shoot Beyblade G Revolution - Matilda
- Full Metal Panic? Fumoffu - Kozue Nishino

2004

- Soreike! Zukkoke Sanningumi - Yōko Arai
- Detective School Q - Arisa Tachiki
- Bobobo-bo Bo-bobo - Re-zun Onna (Ep. 26)

2005

- Air - Potato
- Bobobo-bo Bo-bobo - Kopacchi (Ep. 74); Shaina (Ep. 52-53)
- Kidō Shinsengumi Moeyo Ken - Suzaku
- Full Metal Panic! The Second Raid - Shiori Kudō
- Lime-Iro Senkitan X - Koshi-goe

2006

- Angel Heart (manga) - Ta-nya (Ep. 15-16)
- Shōnen Onmyōji - Taiin
- Yamato Nadesiko Shichi Henge - Laseine
- GeGeGe no Kitarou (5th Series) as Neko-Musume

2007

- Iwai! (Happy ☆ Lucky) Bikkuriman - Yattemiroku
- MapleStory - Maron
- Lucky Star - Akira Kogami
- Les Misérables: Shōjo Cosette - Marie

2008

- Shugo Chara! - Il
- Shugo Chara!! Doki— - Il
- Skip Beat! - Maria Takarada
- Porphy no Nagai Tabi - Colinna
- Mahōtsukai ni Taisetsu na Koto - Ruriko Nishihara
- on-chan - ok-chan
- Yatterman (Remake) - Miki (Ep. 13)

2009

- Kiddy Girl-and - Letuchaia
- Shugo Chara!! Party - Il
- Sora wo Miageru Shōjo no Hitomi ni Utsuru Sekai - Suzume Imamura
- Natsu no Arashi! - Shop clerk (Ep. 7)
- Metal Fight Beyblade - Yui

2010

- Amagami SS - Sae Nakata

2011

- Digimon Xros Wars - Lunamon
- Aku no Death General to Nanatsu no Ōkoku - Lunamon
- Nichijō - Professor (Hakase)
- Fractale - Sanko
- Mirai Nikki - Kamado Ueshita

2012

- Atchi Kotchi - Kana Miyama
- Amagami SS+ plus - Sae Nakata
- Saki Achiga-hen episode of Side-A - Yae Kobashiri
- Dumomo & Nupepe - Dori-chan
- Tanken Driland - Kinopi (Ep. 10)
- Digimon Xros Wars: Toki o Kakeru Shōnen Hunter-tachi - Bakomon-chan

2013
Kyōkai no Kanata - Yayoi Kanbara
2014

- Tanken Driland: 1000-nen no Mahō - Handicraft Girl Pocket
- Tokyo ESP - Kozuki Kuroi
- Minna Atsumare! Falcom Gakuen - Tita
- Rail Wars! - Bernina
- Minna Atsumare! Falcom Gakuen SC - Tita
- World Trigger - Saho Arashiyama
- One Piece - Flapper, Charlotte Citron

2015

- World Trigger - Izuho Natsume
- PriPara - Neko (Ep. 40-140)

2017

- Dragon Ball Super - Cus

=== Original video animation (OVA) ===
- Love and Berry: Dress Up and Dance! - Love
- Gate Keepers 21 (2002) - Female Student A (ep 1)
- Kidō Shinsengumi Moeyo Ken (2003) - Suzaku
- Munto (2003) - Suzume Imamura
- Re: Cutie Honey (2004) - Scarlet Claw
- Munto ~Toki no Kabe wo Koete~ (2005) - Suzume Imamura
- Full Metal Panic! The Second Raid (2006) - Shiori Kudō
- Oshiete! Harerun (2006) - Aya
- Sakura Taisen: New York NY. (2007) - Servant; Bastet
- Isekai no Seikishi Monogatari (2009) -
- Lucky Star OVA (2008) - Akira Kogami
- The Legend of Heroes: Trails in the Sky - The Animation (2011) - Tita Russel
- Kaibutsu Ojō (2011) - Nakua
- Nichijō Episode 0 (2011) - Professor (Hakase)

=== Web Anime ===
- Miyakawa-ke no Kūfuku (2013) - Akira Kogami

=== Film ===
- Tenjōbito to Akutobito Saigo no Tatakai (2009) - Suzume Imamura

=== Tokusatsu ===
- Hyakujuu Sentai Gaoranger - Pyochan (Child Soul Bird) (Ep. 13-14); Yoochan (Ep. 27)
- Kamen Rider Fourze - Dark Yuki (Actor by:Fumika Shimizu) (Ep. 43-44); Gemini Zodiarts (Ep. 43-44))

=== Video games ===
- Airforce Delta Strike - Lilia Mihajlovna
- Soulcalibur III - Hualin; Luna; Girl 2 in Character Creation mode
- Riviera: The Promised Land - Lina
- Rune Factory Frontier - Candy
- Oshare Majo: Love and Berry - Love
- Tales of Symphonia - Seles Wilder
- Nora to Toki no Kōbō: Kiri no Mori no Majo - Elsie Quin
- Luminous Arc 2: Will - Popuri/Pop (Potpourri)
- Shin Sangokumusou Multi Raid 2 - Beauty Yu
- Amagami - Nakata Sae
- Azur Lane - IJN Shouhou

=== Dubbing ===
- The Lion King - Shenzi
- Rio 2 - Clara the Capybara
- SpongeBob SquarePants - Karen
- Oliver and Company - Rita
- Shrek 2 - The Fairy Godmother
