= Watashi wa Shadow =

Japanese manga series

- First tankōbon volume cover

私はシャドウ
- Manga
- Written by: Noriko Kasuya
- Published by: Shueisha
- Magazine: You
- Original run: 30 June 2007 – 15 November 2010
- Volumes: 6
- Television drama

Sengyō Shufu Tantei: Watashi wa Shadow
- Original network: TBS
- Original run: 21 October 2011 – 16 December 2011
- Episodes: 9
- icon

Watashi wa Shadow (Japanese: 私はシャドウ, Hepburn: Watashi wa Shadō; lit. "I Am Shadow") is a Japanese manga series written and illustrated by Noriko Kasuya. It was serialized in Shueisha's josei manga magazine You from June 2007 to November 2010, with its chapters collected in six tankōbon volumes. A nine-episode television drama adaptation was broadcast on TBS from October to December 2011.

== Media ==
=== Manga ===
Written and illustrated by Noriko Kasuya, Watashi wa Shadow was serialized in Shueisha's josei manga magazine You from 30 June 2007 to 15 November 2010. Shueisha collected its chapters in six tankōbon volumes, released from 18 June 2008 to 23 September 2011. Two extra chapters were published in You on June 1 and 15 October 2011.

=== Drama ===
A nine-episode television drama adaptation, titled Sengyō Shufu Tantei: Watashi wa Shadow (専業主婦探偵〜私はシャドウ, "Housewife Detective: I am a Shadow"), was broadcast on TBS from 21 October to 16 December 2011. Perfume performed the series' theme song "Spice" (スパイス, Supaisu).
