= Dame na Watashi ni Koishite Kudasai =

Japanese manga series

- First tankōbon volume cover

ダメな私に恋してください
- Genre: Romantic comedy
- Manga
- Written by: Aya Nakahara
- Published by: Shueisha
- Imprint: Margaret Comics
- Magazine: You
- Original run: April 15, 2013 – August 12, 2016
- Volumes: 10
- Manga

Dame na Watashi ni Koishite Kudasai R
- Written by: Aya Nakahara
- Published by: Shueisha
- Imprint: Margaret Comics
- Magazine: You
- Original run: October 15, 2016 – October 15, 2018
- Volumes: 6

Dame na Watashi ni Koishite Kudasai (ダメな私に恋してください; lit. "Please Love the Useless Me") is a Japanese romantic comedy manga series written and illustrated by Aya Nakahara. It was serialized in Shueisha's josei manga magazine You from April 2013 to August 2016, with its chapters collected into ten tankōbon volumes. A sequel series, titled Dame na Watashi ni Koishite Kudasai R, was serialized in the same magazine from October 2016 to October 2018, and was compiled into six volumes.

A Japanese television drama adaptation, officially titled Please Love Me! (stylized as PLEASE LOVE ME!) in English, was broadcast on TBS from January 12, 2016, to March 15, 2016.

== Plot ==
Michiko Shibata is a woman who is thirty years old, and yet she has no job, no money, and no real boyfriend. She was let go by her former employment after it went bankrupt. She meets her former supervisor Ayumu Kurosawa, who offers Michiko a job at his cafe "Himawari" until she gets back on her feet. With Ayumu's help, Michiko slowly gets her life back on track.

== Characters ==
Michiko Shibata (柴田 ミチコ, Shibata Michiko)
A 29-year-old woman who loses her job and starts working for her former supervisor in his café until she finds another job. She is played by Kyoko Fukada in the live-action drama.
Ayumu Kurosawa (黒沢 歩, Kurosawa Ayumu)
Michiko's former supervisor and now current employer at the Himawari cafe. He used to be a former gangster and seems formidable, but he takes it upon himself to look after those who are in trouble, such as Michiko. He is played by Dean Fujioka in the live-action drama.
Daichi Mogami (最上 大地, Mogami Daichi)
Michiko's colleague at her new place of employment. He is her first real boyfriend, and is younger than her. He is played by Shohei Miura in the live-action drama.

== Publication ==
Written and illustrated by Aya Nakahara, Dame na Watashi ni Koishite Kudasai was serialized in Shueisha's You magazine from April 15, 2013, to August 12, 2016. Ten tankōbon volumes have been released from August 2013 to November 2016. The series has been licensed in France by Delcourt under the title Please love me !.

A sequel series, titled Dame na Watashi ni Koishite Kudasai R, was serialized in the same magazine from October 15, 2016, to October 15, 2018. Six tankōbon volumes have been released from February 2017 to November 2018.

=== Dame na Watashi ni Koishite Kudasai ===
No.	Japanese release date	Japanese ISBN
1	August 23, 2013	978-4-08-845089-6
2	December 25, 2013	978-4-08-845148-0
3	April 25, 2014	978-4-08-845204-3
4	August 25, 2014	978-4-08-845260-9
5	December 25, 2014	978-4-08-845323-1
6	April 24, 2015	978-4-08-845384-2
7	August 25, 2015	978-4-08-845439-9
8	December 25, 2015	978-4-08-845507-5
9	May 25, 2016	978-4-08-845562-4
10	November 25, 2016	978-4-08-845678-2

=== Dame na Watashi ni Koishite Kudasai R ===
No.	Japanese release date	Japanese ISBN
1	February 24, 2017	978-4-08-845727-7
2	June 23, 2017	978-4-08-845782-6
3	November 24, 2017	978-4-08-845859-5
4	March 23, 2018	978-4-08-844018-7
5	July 25, 2018	978-4-08-844075-0
6	November 22, 2018	978-4-08-844134-4

== Reception ==
Volume 4 reached the 16th place on the weekly Oricon manga charts and, as of August 31, 2014, had sold 56,282 copies; volume 5 reached the 43rd place and, as of January 4, 2015, had sold 69,150 copies; volume 6 reached the 25th place and, as of April 26, 2015, had sold 34,567 copies.
