= Amagami =

Japanese dating simulation game & franchise

- The cover of Amagami, featuring Tsukasa Ayatsuji

アマガミ
- Genre: Romantic Comedy
- Video game
- Developer: Enterbrain
- Publisher: Enterbrain, Kadokawa Shoten (EbiKore+)
- Genre: Dating sim, Mahjong game (EbiKore+)
- Platform: PlayStation 2, PlayStation Portable, PlayStation Vita
- Released: March 19, 2009: PlayStation 2; JP: March 19, 2009 EbiKore+ Amagami PS2, PSP; JP: March 31, 2011 PSVita; JP: January 30, 2014
- Manga

Amagami: Sincerely Yours
- Written by: Kotetsu Sakura
- Published by: Enterbrain
- Magazine: Famitsu Comic Clear
- Original run: October 30, 2009 – Jul 30, 2010
- Volumes: 1
- Manga

Amagami: Precious Diary
- Written by: Tarō Shinonome
- Published by: Hakusensha
- Magazine: Young Animal; Young Animal Island
- Original run: November 27, 2009 – September 2010
- Volumes: 2
- Manga

Amagami: Love Goes On!
- Written by: Ryuya Kamino
- Published by: ASCII Media Works
- Magazine: Dengeki Maoh
- Original run: March 2010 – January 27, 2014
- Volumes: 3
- Manga
- Written by: Piaisai
- Published by: Enterbrain
- Magazine: Famitsu Comic Clear
- Original run: April 30, 2010 – present
- Anime television series

Amagami SS
- Directed by: Yoshimasa Hiraike
- Written by: Yoshimasa Hiraike
- Music by: Toshiyuki Omori
- Studio: AIC
- Licensed by: NA: Sentai Filmworks; UK: MVM Entertainment
- Original network: JNN (TBS, CBC, MBS, BS-TBS)
- English network: NA: Anime Network
- Original run: July 2, 2010 – December 23, 2010
- Episodes: 26 + 2 OVAs
- Manga

Amagami: Close to You
- Written by: Tomoya Andō
- Published by: Kadokawa Shoten
- Magazine: Comp Ace
- Published: October 2010
- Manga

Amagami: Precious Diary - Kaoru
- Written by: Tarō Shinonome
- Published by: Hakusensha
- Magazine: Young Animal; Young Animal Island
- Original run: November 2010 – December 2011
- Volumes: 2
- Anime television series

Amagami SS+ plus
- Directed by: Tomoki Kobayashi
- Written by: Noboru Kimura
- Music by: Toshiyuki Omori
- Studio: AIC
- Licensed by: NA: Sentai Filmworks; UK: MVM Entertainment
- Original network: JNN (TBS, CBC, BS-TBS), SUN
- Original run: January 5, 2012 – March 29, 2012
- Episodes: 13 + 8 OVAs
- icon

Amagami (アマガミ, Amagami; lit. "Gentle bite" (Note: As explained in Episode 26 of the Amagami SS animated series.)), is a Japanese dating simulation game for the PlayStation 2 and the spiritual successor to KimiKiss, both of which were developed and published by Enterbrain. Amagami was released on March 19, 2009. As of November 2010, six manga adaptations have been produced: two serialized in Enterbrain's Famitsu Comic Clear, two in Hakusensha's Young Animal and Young Animal Island, one in ASCII Media Works' Dengeki Maoh and one in Kadokawa Shoten's Comp Ace. An anime adaptation titled Amagami SS aired in Japan from July 1, 2010, to December 23, 2010. An anime sequel titled Amagami SS+ plus, pronounced as "Amagami SS Plus", aired in Japan from January 6 to March 29, 2012. Seiren is a sequel to the similarly structured Amagami adaptation, set in the same high school, albeit 9 years later.

== Plot ==
Two years ago, Junichi Tachibana had his heart broken by a girl who stood him up on a date on Christmas Eve. Now a second-year student in high school, Junichi is wary of love because of his past and dislikes celebrating Christmas. This Christmas, his encounter with one of six girls from his school—Haruka Morishima, Kaoru Tanamachi, Sae Nakata, Ai Nanasaki, Rihoko Sakurai, or Tsukasa Ayatsuji—will lead him to open up to one of them.

== Characters ==
=== Main characters ===
Junichi Tachibana (橘 純一, Tachibana Jun'ichi)
Voiced by: Tomoaki Maeno / Momoko Saitō (Childhood)
The lead male protagonist of the story, and class 2A student. He has had a hard time opening up to others since his Christmas Eve date stood him up two years ago. He also fears heights, as he feels uncomfortable when riding elevators. Although his sister Miya thinks of him as unreliable and slightly perverted, in the various character arcs, he shows that he is quite responsible when he puts his mind to it. He is academically better than the average student, particularly in math, but has a tendency to oversleep in the mornings and has to be woken up by his sister.
Haruka Morishima (森島 はるか, Morishima Haruka)
Voiced by: Shizuka Itō
A very popular girl in her final year, who has many fans at school. She can be described as a fickle and insecure girl with a liking for cute things, especially puppies. Her best friend is Hibiki Tsukahara and she has a younger brother named Satoshi. She is a quarter British from her mother, whose family's surname is Lovely (thus Haruka's middle name). Possibly as a nod to her heritage, she frequently mixes English phrases into her speech.
Kaoru Tanamachi (棚町 薫, Tanamachi Kaoru)
Voiced by: Rina Satō
One of Junichi's childhood friends and class 2A classmate, she often hangs out with him and his best friend, Masayoshi. She is unpredictable and is liable to punch or otherwise physically assault Junichi unexpectedly. Kaoru does household chores and works part-time at a family restaurant to help support her single mother, who later dates another man. Her feelings for Junichi have been building since middle school, even though he is usually completely oblivious to it.
Sae Nakata (中多 紗江, Nakata Sae)
Voiced by: Hiromi Konno
A friend and classmate of Miya's. Having studied at an all-girls school for most of her life, Sae is incredibly shy around men. She has a soft, quiet voice and though generally reserved, shows a child-like enthusiasm for the Inago Mask superheroes. She also has a severe fear of dogs. Sae's arc in the anime is unique in that her story is regularly narrated by Jouji Nakata, as well as some instances in breaking the fourth wall.
Ai Nanasaki (七咲 逢, Nanasaki Ai)
Voiced by: Yukana
A friend and classmate of Miya's. She is a member of their school's swimming team. She has a younger brother named Ikuo and possesses a cool, calm disposition. She is responsible for maintaining the household, as both of her parents work long hours.
Rihoko Sakurai (桜井 梨穂子, Sakurai Rihoko)
Voiced by: Ryōko Shintani
She is Junichi's childhood friend who, despite her large appetite for sweets, or because of it, avidly reads the dieting books in the school library. She is a member of the Tea Club. In Rihoko's arc, it is told more from her perspective rather than Junichi's.
Tsukasa Ayatsuji (絢辻 詞, Ayatsuji Tsukasa)
Voiced by: Kaori Nazuka
Class 2A's class representative, who excels academically and is a hard worker. While she acts kind and friendly, this is actually a facade that secretly hides the real her, who is manipulative, cunning, and selfish.

=== Supporting characters ===
Miya Tachibana (橘 美也, Tachibana Miya)
Voiced by: Kana Asumi
Junichi's younger sister, who playfully calls her brother, "Nii-nii". She tends to be jealous when her brother is with another girl, with the exceptions of Sae, Ai and Rihoko, who are her close friends. Her favorite food is nikuman, which she frequently brings up in conversation, often completely out of context. She often wakes her brother up when it is time for school. She has a very distinctive laugh.
Maya Takahashi (高橋 麻耶, Takahashi Maya)
Voiced by: Risa Hayamizu
Class 2A's homeroom teacher. Usually a serious teacher, she easily gets drunk when she drinks amazake. She has a mini route within Ai's route. The 2nd Amagami Chotto Omake Gekijou (アマガミ ちょっとおまけ劇場) fan disc expands on this mini-route, making her a winnable heroine.
Masayoshi Umehara (梅原 正吉, Umehara Masayoshi)
Voiced by: Takuma Terashima
Junichi's best friend since childhood, who has an interest in Japanese idols. He often purchases photo books of them and shares them with Junichi. His family owns a sushi shop, which he plans to inherit. He always refers to Junichi as "Boss".
Kanae Itō (伊藤 香苗, Itō Kanae)
Voiced by: Yuki Matsuoka
A close friend of Rihoko's. She wins the Miss Santa Contest during the Kibitou High School's Founder's Festival should Haruka not participate.
Keiko Tanaka (田中 恵子, Tanaka Keiko)
Voiced by: Mai Kadowaki
A friend of Kaoru's. A quiet girl, Kaoru and Junichi give her advice on how to deal with her crush on a boy at school.
Hibiki Tsukahara (塚原 響, Tsukahara Hibiki)
Voiced by: Yū Asakawa
Haruka's friend who is captain of the girls' swimming team and Ai's senior. She tends to berate Haruka's frivolous nature. The 4th Amagami Chotto Omake Gekijou (アマガミ ちょっとおまけ劇場) fan disc covers her route, making her a winnable heroine.
Ruriko Yuzuki (夕月 琉璃子, Yuzuki Ruriko)
Voiced by: Izumi Satou
Rihoko's senior and a member of the Tea Club. Ruriko tends to worry about Rihoko's clumsiness as the future of the Tea Club will be in the latter's hands once she and Manaka graduate.
Manaka Hiba (飛羽 愛歌, Hiba Manaka)
Voiced by: Hitomi Harada
Rihoko's senior and another member of the Tea Club. Manaka has a rather quiet voice and a tendency to speak cryptically.
Yukari Ayatsuji (絢辻 縁, Ayatsuji Yukari)
Voiced by: Aiko Igarashi
Tsukasa's older sister who is pleasant but oblivious and somewhat irresponsible. It these latter traits that Tsukasa dislikes about her sister.
Risa Kamizaki (上崎 裡沙, Kamizaki Risa)
Voiced by: Mai Kadowaki
A secret character in the game and anime. A shy girl, Risa has been in love with Junichi since grade school and has been secretly stalking him since. Risa is also the one responsible for what happened two years ago under the belief she was protecting Junichi from humiliation.
In the Amagami Official Complete Guide, she is listed as a student of class 2-B but in the game, she is a student from class 2-C. In the anime, she is a student from class 2-B and Rihoko's classmate.
Jessica "Sexy" Morishima (森島・S・ジェシカ, Morishima "Sexy" Jessica)
Voiced by: Shizuka Itou
A character created exclusively for the Amagami SS+ anime, she is Haruka's cousin and looks exactly like her but with blond hair with green eyes. Her bangs also sway in a different direction than Haruka's, while wearing a white headband. She came to Japan to go sight seeing and also take Haruka back to England in one week prior to their grandparent's request without Junichi knowing the truth.
Masa (マサ) & Ken (ケン)
Voiced by: Daisuke Ono & Tomokazu Sugita (Drama CD)
Junichi's two other male friends who do not appear in the anime. Originally, they did not have their own character design, but since their appearance in the Drama CDs, Kisai Takayama, the character designer for the game, created their designs based on ideas by Tomokazu Sugita, Ken's voice actor.
Kaoru's Uncle
Voiced by: Hiroshi Kamiya (Drama CD)
Kaoru's unnamed uncle in the Drama CD. He is her uncle on her father's side of the family.

== Adaptations ==
=== Game ports ===
The game saw an updated re-release with a number of bug fixes under the name of EbiKore+ Amagami (エビコレ+ アマガミ) and a port to the PlayStation Portable with the same title on March 31, 2011, this time with Kadokawa Games as the publisher. This version features a playable Mahjong minigame. The PSP version requires at least PSP Firmware 6.31 to run. A port was also released for the PlayStation Vita on 30 January 2014. The game was only released in Japan.

=== Manga ===
- A multi-volume tankōbon manga titled Amagami: Various Artists features various short stories written and drawn by various authors. The most recent volume, volume 6, was released on February 25, 2012.
- Using the same anthology model as Amagami Various Artist, a series titled Majikyu 4-coma Amagami! (マジキュー4コマ アマガミ) has been publishing by Enterbrain under their Majikyu (shortened for magical-cute) label. The most recent volume, volume 7, was released on June 25, 2012.
- A manga adaptation titled Amagami: Sincerely Yours, illustrated by Kotetsu Sakura, began serialization in Enterbrain's Famitsu Comic Clear web version from October 30, 2009, but was cancelled in 2010. The first (and only) tankōbon volume was published on June 29, 2010, in the middle of the story for Tsukasa Ayatsuji.
- Amagami: Precious Diary, illustrated by Tarō Shinonome, serialized in Hakusensha's Young Animal from November 27, 2009, to March 29. 2012; the manga is also serialized in Young Animal's special edition magazine Young Animal Island in irregular intervals. The first volume was released on June 15, 2010. The first 2 volumes focuses on Tsukasa Ayatsuji, while volumes 3 and 4 focuses on Kaoru Tanamachi. A fifth volume which is an anthology of 10 previously published special chapters in colors with various illustrations included was published on June 29, 2012; the limited edition has Haruka & Rihoko on cover while the standard edition has Ai & Sae.
- Amagami: Love Goes On!, illustrated by Ryuya Kamino, which focuses on Junichi's relationship with each of the series heroines, began serialization in the March 2010 issue of ASCII Media Works' Dengeki Maoh. The first volume, which focuses on Ai Nanasaki, was released on August 27, 2010. The second volume, which focuses on Haruka Morishima, was released on December 17, 2011. The current character arc being serialized focuses on Rihoko Sakurai.
- A manga in four-panel comic strip format titled Amagami! (あまがみっ!), illustrated by Piaisai, was serialized in Famitsu Comic Clear from April 30, 2010, to July 15, 2011, with 2 tankoubon published.
- A follow-up to the above serialization named Amagami! SS+ plus! (あまがみっ！SS+ plus!) started serializing in the same online magazine on July 27, 2012. This serialization is not in four-panel format.
- Amagami: Close to You, illustrated by Tomoya Andō, which focuses on Rihoko Sakurai, is published in Kadokawa Shoten's Comp Ace but was later cancelled after one chapter due to the artist's health.
- Amagami: Dreamy Forever, illustrated by Hyura Konata, tells the story of Junichi and his growing relationship with the series heroines from his sister Miya's perspective, is published in Kadokawa Shoten's Comp Ace. Each tankōbon volume focuses on one of the girls with the 1st volume focusing on Haruka. Currently on hiatus.
- A different serialization titled Amagami wa! (アマガミ わっ！) started in the quarterly magazine amaro on December 24, 2011. With the main story surrounding Rihoko and her 2 seniors in the Tea Ceremony Club. This title has been moved to amaro Trial Comic section with a bi-monthly publish schedule since chapter 2 on June 13, 2012.
- A four-panel series 'Amagamini! (アマガミニ！)' started serialized, in commemoration of the 2nd Anime season, on Young Animal magazine. The story surrounding the interaction between the younger version of the main heroines and Tachibana Junichi, as their teacher, in the Tachibana Kindergarten.
- There is another four-panel serialization titled 'Amagamisuto e no michi! (アマガミストへの道; Road to Amagamist)' that was published weekly from early 2009. But serialization ended abruptly after publishing 1 tankōbon under Famitsu Comic Clear label on October 15, 2010.

=== Anime ===
An anime television series adaptation by AIC titled Amagami SS aired from July 2, 2010, to December 23, 2010, in Japan. The anime adaptation is divided into six four-episode story arcs where each arc focuses on one of the main heroines who will become Junichi's love interest along with two extra episodes that focuses on Risa Kamizaki and Miya Tachibana. Also included are two bonus OVA Short Story DVDs that were delivered to customers who ordered the first six Blu-ray/DVDs for the first OVA and the next six Blu-ray/DVDs for the second OVA. On May 21, 2011, Sentai Filmworks announced at Anime Central 2011 they have licensed the anime series for North America. On August 13, 2011, it was announced that Amagami SS would get a second season.

The anime has ten pieces of theme music: two opening themes and eight ending themes; each ending theme is sung by the voice actresses of the heroines of the series in their respective story arc. The first opening theme is "i Love" by azusa which ran from episode 1 to 13 and was released on July 19, 2010. The second opening theme is "Kimi no Mama de" (君のままで; "Just Being You") by azusa which was used from episode 14 to 26 and was released on October 20, 2010. The first ending theme, used for episodes one through four, is "Kimi no Hitomi ni Koishiteru" (キミの瞳に恋してる; "I Love Your Eyes") by Shizuka Itō and was released on July 21, 2010. The second ending theme, used for episodes five through eight, is "Kitto Ashita wa..." (きっと明日は...; "Surely Tomorrow Will...") by Rina Satō and was released on August 18, 2010. The third ending theme, used for episodes nine through twelve, is "Anata Shika Mienai" (あなたしか見えない; "I Can't See Anything But You") by Hiromi Konno and was released on September 15, 2010. The fourth ending theme, used for episodes 13 through 16, is "Koi wa Mizuiro" (恋はみずいろ; "Love is Colored Like Water") by Yukana and was released on October 20, 2010. The fifth ending theme, used for episodes 17 through 20, is "Koi wa Aserazu" (恋はあせらず; "Love is Calm") by Ryōko Shintani and was released on November 17, 2010. The sixth ending theme, used for episodes 21 through 24, is "Nageki no Tenshi" (嘆きの天使; "The Angel of Lamentation") by Kaori Nazuka and was released on December 15, 2010. The seventh ending theme, used for episode 25 is "Koi no Yukue" (恋のゆくえ; "Love's Course") by Mai Kadowaki. The eighth and final ending theme, used for episode 26 is "Suteki na Aru Hi" (素敵なある日; "Nice Day") by Kana Asumi. Both the seventh and eighth ending themes were released on January 19, 2011.

== Reception ==
The anime adaptation received positive reviews. THEM anime gave Amagami SS 3 out of 5 stars. They sum up the review saying it could have been better but overall an enjoyable series for older teens. Chris Beveridge from The Fandom Post gave the complete collection content a grade of A−. He recommended it for fans wanting different story arcs, and cited that it plays to the series roots as a video game.
