= Kōdai-ke no Hitobito =

Japanese manga series

- Cover of volume 1.

高台家の人々
- Genre: Romantic comedy
- Manga
- Written by: Kozueko Morimoto
- Published by: Shueisha
- Magazine: You
- Published: December 2012
- Manga
- Written by: Kozueko Morimoto
- Published by: Shueisha
- Magazine: You
- Original run: February 15, 2013 – March 15, 2017
- Volumes: 6
- Live-action film
- Kōdai-ke no Hitobito (film)

Kōdai-ke no Hitobito (高台家の人々; "People of the Kōdai Family") is a Japanese romantic comedy josei manga series written and illustrated by Kozueko Morimoto. Published by Shueisha, the chapters of the manga were serialized on You between February 15, 2013, and March 15, 2017, and have been compiled into six tankōbon volume. It was preceded by a one-shot published in the same magazine in December 2012, and followed by two side stories in April 2017 and December 2017. A live-action film adaptation of the same name was released in Japan on June 4, 2016.

== Characters ==
- Kie Hirano
- Mitsumasa Kōdai

== Volumes ==
No.	Release date	ISBN
1	September 25, 2013	978-4-08-845109-1
2	May 23, 2014	978-4-08-845221-0
3	January 23, 2015	978-4-08-845341-5
4	September 25, 2015	978-4-08-845456-6
5	May 25, 2016	978-4-08-845586-0
6	May 25, 2017	978-4-08-845755-0

== Reception ==
Volumes 3 reached the ninth place on the Oricon weekly manga charts and, as of February 8, 2015, had sold 120,783 copies. Volume 4 also reached the ninth place on the charts and, as of October 11, 2015, had sold 157,073 copies. Volume 6 charted at the third position and, as of June 4, 2017, had sold 202,215.

The first two volumes placed 44th on the 15th Book of the Year list of comics by Da Vinci magazine and the first four volumes placed 23rd the following year. It was 11th placed in Zenkoku Shotenin ga Eranda Osusume Comic 2015, a ranking of the top 15 manga recommended by Japanese bookstores. It was a candidate in the Manga category at the 2016 Sugoi Japan Awards held by Yomiuri Shimbun. It was number twelve on the 2016 Kono Manga ga Sugoi! Top 20 Manga for Female Readers survey.

== Film adaptation ==
A live-action film adaptation premiered on June 4, 2016.

== See also ==
- Ashi-Girl, another manga series by the same author
- Gokusen, another manga series by the same author
