= Minna Atsumare! Falcom Gakuen =

Japanese comedy manga series

- Cover of Minna Atsumare! Falcom Gakuen volume 1 by Field Y

みんな集まれ！ファルコム学園 (Minna Atsumare! Farukomu Gakuen)
- Genre: Comedy
- Manga
- Written by: Daisuke Arakubo
- Published by: Field Y
- Magazine: Falcom Magazine
- Original run: 2012 – 2015
- Volumes: 4
- Anime television series
- Directed by: Pippuya
- Written by: Kenichi Yamashita
- Music by: Falcom Sound Team jdk
- Studio: chara-ani, Dax Production
- Original network: Tokyo MX, Sun TV
- Original run: January 5, 2014 – March 30, 2014
- Episodes: 13
- Anime television series

Minna Atsumare! Falcom Gakuen SC
- Directed by: Pippuya
- Written by: Kenichi Yamashita
- Studio: chara-ani, Dax Production
- Original network: Tokyo MX, Sun TV
- Original run: January 4, 2015 – March 29, 2015
- Episodes: 13

Minna Atsumare! Falcom Gakuen (Japanese: みんな集まれ！ファルコム学園, Hepburn: Minna Atsumare! Farukomu Gakuen; "Everyone Assemble! Falcom Academy") is a Japanese 4-panel comedy manga series by Daisuke Arakubo, serialized in Monthly Falcom Magazine. The manga was serialized to celebrate the video game company Nihon Falcom's 30th anniversary. It is based on the game Ys vs. Trails in the Sky, featuring characters from their Ys and Trails franchises.

It was collected in four tankōbon volumes. An anime television series adaptation aired between January and March 2014, with a second season, Minna Atsumare! Falcom Gakuen SC, airing between January and March 2015.

== Characters ==
Adol Christin
Voiced by: Yuki Kaji
From the Ys series
Estelle Bright
Voiced by: Akemi Kanda
From the Trails series
Joshua Bright
Voiced by: Mitsuki Saiga
From the Trails series
Tio Plato
Voiced by: Kaori Mizuhashi
From the Trails series
Dark Fact
Voiced by: Kazuyuki Okitsu
From the Ys series
Olivier Lenheim
Voiced by: Takehito Koyasu
From the Trails series
Lloyd Bannings
Voiced by: Tetsuya Kakihara
From the Trails series
Tita Russell
Voiced by: Hiromi Konno
From the Trails series
Renne
Voiced by: Kumiko Nishihara
From the Trails series
Dogi
Voiced by: Keisuke Baba
From the Ys series
Geis
Voiced by: Takuya Satō
From the Ys series
Agate Crosner
Voiced by: Takayuki Kondo
From the Trails series
Rappy
Voiced by: Naomi Shindō
From Ys vs. Trails in the Sky
Mishy
Voiced by: Kanako Kotera
From the Trails series

== Volumes ==
No.	Title	Release date	ISBN
1	Minna Atsumare! Falcom Gakuen 1 (みんな集まれ！ファルコム学園 (1))	July 25, 2012	978-489610-245-1
2	Minna Atsumare! Falcom Gakuen 2 (みんな集まれ！ファルコム学園 (2))	September 26, 2013	978-489610-286-4
3	Minna Atsumare! Falcom Gakuen 3 (みんな集まれ！ファルコム学園 (3))	October 25, 2014	978-489610-836-1
4	Minna Atsumare! Falcom Gakuen 4 (みんな集まれ！ファルコム学園 (4))	October 10, 2015	978-4-8021-3013-4
