= Aya Nakahara =

Japanese manga artist

Aya Nakahara 中原アヤ
- Born: July 28, 1973 (age 53) Osaka, Japan
- Area: Manga artist
- Notable works: Love Com
- Awards: 49th Shogakukan Manga Award for shōjo – Love Com

Aya Nakahara (中原アヤ, Nakahara Aya; born July 28, 1973) is a Japanese manga artist. She won the 49th Shogakukan Manga Award for shōjo manga for Lovely Complex a.k.a. Love Com, a romance manga about a tall high school girl who falls in love with a short guy.

== Works ==
- Haru to Kuuki Nichiyobi (1995)
- Benkyou Shinasai! (1997) – 2 volumes
- Seishun no Tamago (1997)
- Love! Love! Love! (1998–99) – 3 volumes
- Ringo Nikki (2000) – 2 volumes
- Hanada (2001) – 2 volumes
- Love Com (Bessatsu Margaret, 2001–07) – 17 volumes
  - Love Com D (Deluxe Margaret, 2009)
  - Love Com Two (2012)
- Himitsu Kichi (2004)
- Bokura no Ibasho (2007)
- Tokimeki Gakuen Oujigumi (2008)
- Nanaco Robin (Bessatsu Margaret, 2008–09) – 3 volumes
- Junjou Drop (2012) – 1 volume
- Berry Dynamite (Bessatsu Margaret, 2009–10) – 3 volumes
- Saredo Itoshii Hibi (2013) – 1 volume
- Dame na Watashi ni Koishite Kudasai (Monthly You, 2013–16) – 10 volumes
  - Dame na Watashi ni Koishite Kudasai R (Monthly You, 2016–18) – 6 volumes
- Otonanajimi (Cocohana, 2019–21) – 8 volumes
- Ōkami ni Suzu (Cocohana, 2021–23) – 4 volumes
