= Gokusen =

Japanese manga series and its adaptations

- First wideban volume cover, featuring Kumiko Yamaguchi

ごくせん
- Genre: Comedy; Martial arts; Yakuza
- Manga
- Written by: Kozueko Morimoto
- Published by: Shueisha
- Imprint: You Comics
- Magazine: You
- Original run: 2000 – 2007
- Volumes: 15
- Television drama
- Directed by: Tōya Satō; Tarō Ōtani; Naoharu Takahashi (S1); Tomoaki Watanabe (S2); Manami Yamashita (S3)
- Produced by: Shōshun Katō
- Written by: Michiru Egashira; Yūko Matsuda; Rie Yokota
- Music by: Michiru Ōshima
- Licensed by: Amazon Prime Video (streaming)
- Original network: Nippon TV
- Original run: April 17, 2002 – June 28, 2008
- Episodes: 33
- Live-action television film

Gokusen Special: Sayonara 3-nen D-gumi
- Directed by: Tōya Satō
- Produced by: Shōshun Katō
- Written by: Michiru Egashira; Yūko Matsuda; Rie Yokota
- Music by: Michiru Ōshima
- Studio: Nippon TV
- Released: March 26, 2003
- Anime television series
- Directed by: Yuzo Sato
- Produced by: Masao Maruyama; Manabu Tamura; Hiroshi Yamashita
- Written by: Yasuko Kobayashi
- Music by: Tomoki Hasegawa
- Studio: Madhouse
- Licensed by: NA: Media Blasters
- Original network: Nippon TV
- English network: US: Encore WAM
- Original run: January 7, 2004 – March 31, 2004
- Episodes: 13
- Live-action television film

Gokusen 3: Graduation Special 2009
- Directed by: Tōya Satō
- Produced by: Shōshun Katō
- Written by: Michiru Egashira; Rie Yokota
- Music by: Michiru Ōshima
- Studio: Nippon TV
- Released: March 28, 2009
- Theatrical film
- Gokusen: The Movie (2009)
- icon

Gokusen (ごくせん (Note: The title is an abbreviation for Gokudō Sensei (極道先生; lit. 'Yakuza Teacher').)) is a Japanese manga series written and illustrated by Kozueko Morimoto. It was serialized in Shueisha's josei manga magazine You from 2000 to 2007, with its chapters collected in 15 wideban volumes. The story follows Kumiko Yamaguchi, the granddaughter of a yakuza boss and teacher at an all-male private high school.

The manga was adapted into a three-season television drama, with Yukie Nakama in the title role, which was broadcast on Nippon TV from 2002 to 2008, followed by a theatrical film, which premiered in 2009. A 13-episode anime television series adaptation by Madhouse was broadcast on Nippon TV in 2004. The anime series was licensed in North America by Media Blasters.

== Plot ==
Kumiko Yamaguchi is the granddaughter of a yakuza boss, Kuroda of the Kuroda Ikka. Her parents died when she was at the age of seven, and her grandfather had no other descendants, so Kumiko is next in line to head the family business with the title of "ojō" (お嬢; lit. 'young lady'). However, her lifelong dream has been to become a teacher. While her grandfather approves of her choice, others in the family want her to become the next boss.

Kumiko becomes home teacher of class 4-2 in mathematics at an all-boys private high school, where she is known as "Yankumi". Her class is full of delinquents, but she tries her hardest to teach them not just academically, but also about lessons of life. Though she is forced to keep her family a secret from the public, her yakuza upbringing gives her the strength and the experience to reach out to her students, while also providing comedic situations.

== Characters ==
Kumiko "Yankumi" Yamaguchi (山口 久美子, Yamaguchi Kumiko)
Voiced by: Risa Hayamizu (Japanese); Caroline Lawson (English)
Portrayed by: Yukie Nakama, Suzuka Ohgo (young, season 1)
Kumiko Yamaguchi, nicknamed "Yankumi" by her students, is a young teacher at Shirokin Gakuen. Orphaned in childhood, she was raised by her grandfather, the leader of a Tokyo Ninkyo organization, which influences her behavior through yakuza mannerisms and speech patterns. Despite her unconventional background, she demonstrates sincere dedication to her students. Her martial arts skills and genuine concern eventually earn their respect, though her initial teaching approach often startles them. Kumiko exhibits a notable attraction to men wearing fundoshi, while her yakuza connections remain frequently overlooked by others.

=== Shirokin High School ===
Shin Sawada (沢田 慎, Sawada Shin)
Voiced by: Kenichi Suzumura (Japanese); Kevin T. Collins (English)
Portrayed by: Jun Matsumoto
Shin serves as the respected leader of his class, known for his calm demeanor and intelligence. During middle school, he physically confronts a teacher who refuses to apologize for mistreating an innocent student. He quickly notices his new teacher Kumiko's unusual behavior and investigates her background, eventually discovering her yakuza connections. His father holds a senior position in law enforcement. Shin develops romantic feelings for Kumiko, though she remains unaware while others recognize his affection. He frequently attempts to protect Kumiko but typically requires her assistance instead. Later pursuing legal studies to remain close to her, he eventually confesses his feelings. Shin maintains a composed personality, though he demonstrates emotional vulnerability when Kumiko faces danger.
Youichi Minami (南 陽一, Minami Yōichi)
Voiced by: Takurou Nakakuni (Japanese); Sebastian Arcelus (English)
Portrayed by: Yuma Ishigaki
Minami is a classmate and friend of Shin, known for his aggressive tendencies and frequent involvement in fights. He serves as the physically strongest member of their group, though he loses a confrontation with Ichiro Tsuruta. His close friendship with Noda is regularly depicted through their frequent appearances together.
Haruhiko "Uchi" Uchiyama (内山 春彦, Uchiyama Haruhiko)
Voiced by: Yōichi Masukawa (Japanese); Jamie McGonnigal (English)
Portrayed by: Shun Oguri
Uchi is a friend of Shin known for his distinctive hairstyle. During a school trip to Okinawa, his disappearance causes difficulties for Kumiko and Shin, resulting in physical discipline from Kumiko upon his return. While presenting a tough exterior, he shows particular affection for his mother. He develops a relationship with Shiori, a horror enthusiast whose frightening behavior initially unsettles him. Over time, he grows to share her interest in horror, considering a career in special effects makeup.
Teruo "Kuma" Kumai (熊井 輝夫, Kumai Teruo)
Voiced by: Hiromi Sugino (Japanese); Ted Lewis (English)
Portrayed by: Tomohiro Waki
Kumai, nicknamed "Kuma" (meaning "Bear") by his peers, is a physically imposing student known for frequent involvement in conflicts. He shares a close childhood friendship with Shin, whom he affectionately calls "Shin-chan." His mother maintained a friendship with Kumiko prior to her teaching career. As an adult, he maintains ties with Kumiko, offering guidance to her current students while drawing parallels to his own school experiences. He eventually marries his childhood sweetheart and starts a family. Each subsequent class at Shirokin Gakuen features a student bearing notable resemblance to Kumai in both appearance and behavior.
Takeshi Noda (野田 猛, Noda Takeshi)
Voiced by: Isao Yamagishi (Japanese); Matt Kaplan (English)
Portrayed by: Hiroki Narimiya
Takeshi is a classmate of Shin and the originator of Kumiko's "Yankumi" nickname. He demonstrates perceptiveness by being the first to recognize Shin's feelings for Kumiko. Noda develops an infatuation with teacher Shizuka Fujiyama, which leads him to photograph her at a secondary job and nearly cause her disciplinary action. He exhibits fashion sense, notably when styling Kumiko in borrowed clothing that unexpectedly suits her. Noda maintains a close friendship with Minami, frequently appearing alongside him. He occasionally displays unexpected insight and intelligence, offering astute observations about Fujiyama's stalker.
Shizuka Fujiyama (藤山 静香, Fujiyama Shizuka)
Voiced by: Rica Matsumoto (Japanese); Suzanne Gilad (English)
Portrayed by: Misaki Ito
Shizuka joins Shirokin Gakuin's faculty alongside Kumiko as an English teacher (music teacher in some adaptations). A former middle school instructor, she values her transition to high school education. Fujiyama establishes a school choir following a student suicide attempt that profoundly impacts her teaching approach. She maintains a casual demeanor, often joking about male students' appearances. She develops romantic interest in Kyo, though she struggles to reconcile her idealized image of him with reality. While typically professional, she adopts more casual attire in certain adaptations, mirroring Kumiko's tracksuit.
Goro Sawatari (猿渡 五郎, Sawatari Gorō)
Voiced by: Ken Uosaki (Japanese); Marc Diraison (English)
Portrayed by: Katsuhisa Namase
Ken, the vice-principal, serves as Kumiko's primary adversary among the faculty. He eventually discovers her secret affiliation but only after her resignation. Initially antagonistic, his attitude gradually softens as he develops respect for her teaching methods. In one notable incident, he risks his career advancement to inform Kumiko about her students' planned graduation boycott. He maintains a contradictory personal life—while married to a matchmaker, he frequently socializes with younger women. A recurring humorous element involves his consistent ability to retain vice-principal positions at different schools, which even Kumiko finds puzzling. His professional demeanor contrasts with his personal conduct.
Gonzou Shirakawa (白川 権三, Shirakawa Gonzō)
Voiced by: Tomohiro Nishimura (Japanese); Jimmy Zoppi (English)
Portrayed by: Ryosei Tayama
Gonzou, the principal, demonstrates an uncanny ability to appear unexpectedly with pertinent information. Aware of Kumiko's yakuza lineage when hiring her, he specifically recruits her for her ability to manage challenging students. He maintains an eccentric demeanor, often sporting bow ties and displaying cheerful mannerisms. His prescient knowledge of school affairs and unorthodox hiring decisions suggest deeper insight than his appearance implies.

=== Kuroda Family/Ooedo Clan ===
Ryuichiro Kuroda (黒田 龍一郎, Kuroda Ryūichirō)
Voiced by: Chikao Ohtsuka (Japanese); Dan Green (English)
Portrayed by: Ken Utsui
Kumiko's grandfather. He leads a respected yakuza organization with a small but elite membership. Though his immediate group appears modest, he wields significant influence in the underworld and can mobilize thousands of members. His highly skilled followers regularly defeat larger opposing forces, deterring potential challengers. Locally, his organization maintains public order, notably preventing Kudou's escape from the Ooedo Clan. After Kumiko's parents die, he raises her while accepting her choice to become a teacher rather than inherit the family business. He recognizes his daughter Yuriko left for similar reasons. While generally dignified, he shows playful protectiveness toward Kumiko.
Kyotaro "Kyo-san" Oshima (大島 京太郎, Ōshima Kyōtarō)
Voiced by: Norio Wakamoto (Japanese); Peter Ganim (English)
Kyo serves as Kumiko's primary protector within the yakuza organization. Originally assigned as her guardian during childhood, he develops a paternal bond with her despite his shortcomings in this role. He trains Kumiko in self-defense to combat school bullying related to her family background. Their relationship evolves into a father-daughter dynamic, with Kumiko considering him her closest paternal figure. Kyo demonstrates fierce loyalty, going so far as to stage a confrontation to protect Kumiko's secret from her students, then attempting suicide out of remorse for striking her. While deeply protective of both Kumiko and her students, he maintains violent tendencies when perceiving threats to her wellbeing. He eventually recognizes Shin's romantic feelings for Kumiko and approves of their relationship.
Kouzou Wakamatsu (若松 弘三, Wakamatsu Kōzō)
Voiced by: Kenji Anan (Japanese); Mike Pollock (English)
The Kuroda family's young chief assistant maintains close ties with both Ryuichiro and Kyo. As the only married member of the group, he demonstrates unwavering loyalty to his wife Yusue, who operates a popular nightclub frequented by the organization. Like his colleagues, he develops a familial bond with Kumiko, regarding her with protective affection.
Minoru Tatsukawa (達川 ミノル, Tatsukawa Minoru)
Voiced by: Hiroaki Yoshida (Japanese); Sean Schemmel (English)
Portrayed by: Shinji Uchiyama
Minoru is a loyal member of Kumiko's yakuza organization who operates a takoyaki stand near her school with Tetsu. Kumiko took him in as a homeless teenager, establishing a sibling-like relationship. His enthusiastic support occasionally risks exposing her dual identity. He briefly pursued a romantic relationship that ended due to his attempt to leave criminal life.
Tetsu Asakura (朝倉 てつ, Asakura Tetsu)
Voiced by: Keiji Hirai (Japanese); Maddie Blaustein (English)
Portrayed by: Ken Kaneko
Tetsu is a devoted member of Kumiko's yakuza group who maintains a protective watch over her. He operates alongside Minoru, often assisting Kumiko while trying to avoid exposing her secret identity. Kumiko took him in during his teenage years when he had nowhere else to go, establishing a sibling-like relationship that precludes romantic involvement. His loyalty remains steadfast despite this familial boundary.
Fuji Kuroda (黒田 富士, Kuroda Fuji)
Voiced by: Seizō Katō (Japanese); John Avner (English)
Fuji is Kumiko's loyal dog. Though his thoughts are inaudible to most characters, Shin demonstrates an unusual ability to understand him.

=== Others ===
Tomoya Shinohara (篠原 智也, Shinohara Tomoya)
Voiced by: Katsuyuki Konishi (Japanese); Josh Mosby (English)
Portrayed by: Ikki Sawamura
Shinohara serves as legal counsel for Kumiko's yakuza group, repaying her grandfather's support during his law studies. Kumiko maintains romantic feelings for him, though he recognizes Shin's affection for her and ultimately encourages their relationship. When Shinohara invites Kumiko to accompany him home, she declines after consideration. He later returns to his hometown following his father's hospitalization.
Hiroki Kudoh (工藤 広樹, Kudō Hiroki)
Kudoh is a former Shirokin Gakuen student expelled for violent behavior toward younger classmates. His conflict with Kumiko begins when she intervenes in his bullying, leading him to join the rival Nekomata Group. After attempting to frame the Ooedo Clan and kidnapping Kumiko, he is ultimately defeated by her students. Kumiko later assumes responsibility for his rehabilitation despite his initial resistance.
Ichiro Tsuruta (鶴田 一郎, Tsuruta Ichirō)
Voiced by: Tadahisa Saizen (Japanese); Marc Thompson (English)
Ichiro Tsuruta is a former student expelled for bullying junior classmates alongside Kudoh. Considered the school's strongest fighter, he eventually reforms after losing to Kumiko in a secret match. Though physically imposing, he demonstrates unexpected kindness and culinary skills. He later assists classmates when needed and rejoins the school system, though his exact grade level remains unclear due to his prolonged absence.
Ichikawa (一川)
Voiced by: Hiroki Shimowada (Japanese); Michael Sinterniklaas (English)
A Shirokin Gakuen student frequently bullied by peers, he attracts Fujiyama's attention due to his resemblance to a former middle school student. She recruits him for the choir club to remove him from harmful social circles. Kumiko and Shin prevent his attempted suicide by intervening during a rooftop incident. He subsequently becomes an active choir member under Fujiyama's guidance.

== Media ==
=== Manga ===
Written and illustrated by Kozueko Morimoto, Gokusen was serialized in Shueisha's josei manga magazine You from 2000 to 2007. Shueisha collected its chapters in fifteen wideban volumes, released from August 23, 2000, to April 19, 2007.

A sequel, Gokusen: Kanketsu-hen (ごくせん 完結編) (or Gokusen 2008), was published in You from December 28, 2007, to August 1, 2009. These chapters were collected in a single volume, released on January 19, 2010.

==== Volumes ====
No.	Japanese release date	Japanese ISBN
1	August 23, 2000	978-4-08-862503-4
2	March 22, 2001	978-4-08-862529-4
3	August 17, 2001	978-4-08-862535-5
4	March 19, 2002	978-4-08-862539-3
5	July 19, 2002	978-4-08-862542-3
6	March 19, 2003	978-4-08-862548-5
7	July 18, 2003	978-4-08-862552-2
8	December 18, 2003	978-4-08-862554-6
9	June 18, 2004	978-4-08-862557-7
10	December 16, 2004	978-4-08-862560-7
11	May 19, 2005	978-4-08-862564-5
12	September 16, 2005	978-4-08-862569-0
13	March 17, 2006	978-4-08-862570-6
14	October 19, 2006	978-4-08-862572-0
15	April 19, 2007	978-4-08-862573-7
Extra	January 19, 2010	978-4-08-782265-6

=== Drama ===
The first twelve-episode season of Gokusen was broadcast on Nippon TV from April 17 to July 3, 2002. It was followed by a special episode, which aired on March 26, 2003. The theme song is "Feel your breeze" by V6. The first season was broadcast with English subtitles in the United States on KSCI in 2003.

The second ten-episode season of Gokusen, Gokusen 2, was broadcast on Nippon TV from January 15 to March 19, 2005. The theme song is "No More Cry" by D-51. It also includes an insert song, "Kizuna" (絆; lit. 'Bond'), by Kazuya Kamenashi, who portrayed the exclusive drama character Ryū Odagiri. The second season was broadcast with English subtitles in the United States on KSCI in 2005.

The third eleven-episode season of Gokusen, Gokusen 3, was broadcast on Nippon TV from April 19 to June 28, 2008. It was followed by a special episode, which aired on March 28, 2009. The theme song is "Niji" (虹; lit. 'Rainbow') by Aqua Timez. It also includes an insert song, "Oretachi no Seishun" (俺たちの青春; lit. 'Our Youth'), by Hey! Say! JUMP's Yuya Takaki, who portrayed the exclusive drama character Yamato Ogata.

Amazon Prime Video started streaming the three seasons in October 2024.

==== Film ====
The Gokusen television drama was followed and concluded by a theatrical film, Gokusen: The Movie, which premiered in Japan on July 11, 2009.

=== Anime ===
A 13-episode anime television series adaptation by Madhouse and directed by Yuzo Sato, was broadcast on Nippon TV from January 7 to March 31, 2004. The opening theme is "Hontō no Kotoba" (本当の言葉; lit. 'Real Words') by Foot Stamp, and the ending theme is "Onore Michi" (おのれ道; lit. 'My Road') by Aki Yashiro.

The series was licensed for English release in North America by Media Blasters, who released it on three DVDs, under its Anime Works imprint, from October 12, 2004, to March 1, 2005. The series aired in the United States on Encore WAM in 2006.

== Reception ==
The Gokusen television drama was popular in Japan. The first season had average viewer ratings of 17.4% in 2002, while the second season jumped to 28.0% in average ratings in 2005. The last season had average viewer ratings of 22.8%, the highest average rating among other TV dramas that aired around the time.

In The Dorama Encyclopedia: A Guide to Japanese TV Drama Since 1953, by Jonathan Clements and Motoko Tamamuro, they wrote: "Gokusen begins in the style of GTO, but soon veers off course into a criminal variant of Romeo and Juliet. Though probably rushed into production in the wake of The Sopranos, the series has a local pedigree as well, with resemblances to earlier shows such as Downton Detectives and The Quiet Don".

The anime series was frequently compared to Tooru Fujisawa's Great Teacher Onizuka. AnimeNation's John Oppliger wrote that the conflict between Kumiko's "masculine personality" and the Japanese cultural norms, trying to "conform her into a typical contemporary Japanese woman", resulted in an "enjoyable, humorous drama". Oppliger also praised the "subtle elements of yakuza movie", including the enka ending animation, which "added an additional level of charm to the show".

== See also ==
- Ashi-Girl, another manga series by the same author
- Kōdai-ke no Hitobito, another manga series by the same author
