= Michiko Neya =

Japanese voice actress (born 1965)

- 根谷 美智子
- Born: October 4, 1965 (age 61); Takefu, Fukui Prefecture, Japan
- Other name: Keiko Takase (高瀬敬子)
- Occupation: Voice actress
- Years active: 1988–present

Michiko Neya (根谷 美智子, Neya Michiko; born October 4, 1965) is a Japanese voice actress. She was affiliated with Arts Vision and is currently freelancing. Some of her major roles in anime include the title character in New Cutie Honey, Jun the Swan in Gatchaman 94, Ritsuko Takahashi in Hell Teacher Nube, Melissa Mao in Full Metal Panic!, Riza Hawkeye in Fullmetal Alchemist, Vinsmoke Reiju in One Piece series, Chie Sagamiōno in You're Under Arrest, Irene "Rally" Vincent in Gunsmith Cats, Erika Kawai in Boys Be..., Jun Tao in Shaman King and Shaman King 2021, and Doll Izumi in Super Doll Licca-chan. In video games, she has voiced characters in many franchises, including Hsien-Ko/Lei-Lei in DarkStalkers, Mako Sato in Initial D, Sophitia in Soul Edge / Soulcalibur, Rose in Street Fighter Zero 3, Leona in Popolocrois, Natalia Luzu Kimlasca-Lanvaldear in Tales of the Abyss, and Amy Burklight in Tales of Phantasia.

== Filmography ==
=== Anime ===
List of voice performances in anime
Year	Title	Role	Notes	Source
1988	Hai Akko Desu		Debut role	
1991	Sangokushi	Koran's maid		
1992	Chikyū SOS Soreike Kororin ja:地球SOS それいけコロリン	Furon		
1992	Crayon Shin-chan	Musae Koyama		
1992	Gorillaman ja:ゴリラーマン	Miyoko	OVA	
1994	Brave Police J-Decker	Azuki Tomonaga		
1994	Sailor Moon S	Dai Heart		
1994	Tokyo Babylon	Official in charge	OVA ep. 2	
1994–95	New Cutie Honey	Honey		
1994	Metal Fighter Miku	Sayaka		
1994	Fish in the Trap	female student	OVA	
1994–95	Gatchaman 94	Jun the Swan (G-3)	OAV series	
1994	Mahōjin Guru Guru	Kuririsu Princess		
1994	Bounty Dog	Yayoi Okina		
1994	Weather Report Girl お天気お姉さん	Michiko Kawai	Adult OVA	
1995	Romeo no Aoi Sora	Isabella (girls)		
1995	Sailor Moon SuperS	Tomoko		
1995	Jura Tripper	Starch, Professor		
1995	Juu Senshi Garukiba	Konowa Maibaru, Ru Bowaru		
1995	Wild Knights Gulkeeva	Maihara Konoha		
1995	Wedding Peach	Cloud		
1995	Mobile Suit Gundam Wing	Girl Student, announcer		
1995	Bit the Cupid ja:ビット・ザ・キューピッド	Anna Andromeda		
1995	H2	Ryutaro Kine (young), Tomoko, Maiko, Girl A		
1995	Mama Loves the Poyopoyo-Saurus	Kobayashi's mother		
1995	Galaxy Fräulein Yuna: Siren's Sadness	Iron Girl	OVA	
1995	Mojacko	Sugar		
1995	Saint Tail	Eri, Young Chiyo	Ep. 11	
1995	Golden Boy	Instructor C	Ep. 4	
1995	Gunsmith Cats	Irene "Rally" Vincent	OAV	
1995	Kodocha	Natsumi Hayama	OVA pilot	
1995	Ruin Explorers	Ihrie		
1995	Fire Emblem	Lena		
1996	Power Dolls	Fan Quanmei	OVA	
1996	VS Knight Ramune & 40 Fire	Pheromone Lip		
1996	Hell Teacher Nūbē	Ritsuko Takahashi		
1996	Bounty Hunter The Hard	Momoko		
1996	Baby & Me	Tomoko Kimura, Shinako Fukatani Kazumi Omori		
1996	Maze	Nuts	OVA	
1996	Hurricane Polymar: Holy Blood	Ryoko Nishida, Onna prima	OVA	
1996	Reideen the Superior ja:超者ライディーン	Sora Yamada		
1996	Gall Force: The Revolution	Shoot		
1996	You're Under Arrest	Chie Sagamimono	1st TV series	
1996	Magical Project S	Kaori	Ep. 16, 17	
1996–97	Master of Mosquiton series	Yuki	OVA and TV '99 series	
1996	Battle Arena Toshinden	Tracy		
1996	Variable Geo	Ayako Yuuki	OVA	
1997	Ninja Resurrection	young Ocho		
1997	Pokémon	Natsuki, others		
1997	Licca-chan to Yamaneko Hoshi no Tabi リカちゃんとヤマネコ 星の旅	Miki	OVA	
1997	Virus Buster Serge	Lily Petri		
1997	Anime Ganbare Goemon	Yoko Ishikawa		
1997	Fortune Quest L ja:フォーチュン・クエストL	Marina		
1997	Detatoko Princess	Elena		
1997	Kōgyō Aika Volley Boys	Kazumi		
1998	All Purpose Cultural Cat Girl Nuku Nuku	Futaba Kaihara	TV series	
1998	Legend of Basara	Yunoka		
1998	Lost Universe	Kali		
1998	Yu-Gi-Oh!	Shizuka Jōnouchi	Ep. 16	
1998	Fancy Lala	Mogu, Ririka Kawaguchi		
1998	Himitsu no Akko-chan	Policewoman	2nd TV series, Ep. 3	
1998	Cardcaptor Sakura	Shouko Tsujitani		
1998	Sentimental Journey	Female student B	Ep. 1	
1998	Weiss Kreuz	Asakawa Yuriko		
1998	DT Eightron	Cynthia		
1998–08	Initial D series	Mako Sato	Also Extra Stage and Extra Stage 2 specials	
1998	Shadow Skill - Eigi	Gana Gig		
1998	Serial Experiments Lain	Keiko Yoshii		
1998	Momoiro Sisters ja:ももいろシスターズ	Yuki Kurakata		
1998–99	Super Doll Licca-chan	Doll Izumi		
1998	Steam Detectives	Anna	Ep. 20	
1998	Eatman '98	Raffin		
1998	Mamotte Shugogetten	Momoko		
1998–2000	Blue Submarine No. 6	Yoko Gusuke	OVA series	
1999	Phantom Thief Jeanne	Kanako		
1999	To Heart	Serio (HMX-13)		
1999	Gokudo	Kikuei		
1999	Starship Girl Yamamoto Yohko	Sylvia Dread, Sara Dread		
1999–2000	Corrector Yui series	Andy		
1999	Sol Bianca	Teacher		
1999	Dai-Guard	Noriko Oyama		
1999	Steel Angel Kurumi	Yoshino Koganei, Kichijouji		
1999	Dangaizer 3	Diine		
1999	Shūkan Storyland ja:週刊ストーリーランド	Sayaka Sonoda, Yuki Ogawa		
1999	Bikkuriman 2000	Jikaitaigou Nova		
1999	Meltylancer The Animation	Defiant D	OVA	
2000	Hidamari no Ki	Aya		
2000	Platinumhugen Ordian	Reiko 鎬臣麗子		
2000	Saiyuki	Moka, Kanan, others		
2000	Boys Be...	Erika Kawai		
2000	Faaburu sensei ha Meitantei ja:ファーブル先生は名探偵	Angelica (Red Jeanne)		
2000	éX-Driver	Nina A. Thunder	OVA series	
2000–01	Vandread series	Barnette Orangello		
2000	Gear Fighter Dendoh	Kumi Hayase, Otome Izumo, Saeko Oiwa, Manager		
2000	Invincible King Tri-Zenon	Sae Uryuu		
2000	Fencer of Minerva	Diana	Adult OVA series	
2001	The SoulTaker	Runa Tokisaka		
2001	You're Under Arrest Second Season	Chie Sagamiono	2001 TV series	
2001	Read or Die	Nancy Makuhari	OVA series	
2001–21	Shaman King	Tao Jun, Marion Fauna, others		
2001	Captain Kuppa	Seiginomikata		
2001	PaRappa the Rapper	Marie's Mother		
2001	X	Saya Monou (Kotori's mother)		
2001	Najica Blitz Tactics	Athena		
2001	Guystars - Fractions of The Earth	Nona Honosu		
2001	Crush Gear Turbo	Ririka Tobita		
2001	Kokoro Library	Hibiki Asakura		
2001	Kasumin; Mistin ja:カスミン	Ranko Kan, Soketto, Naru Sakakibara, Obasan, others		
2001–03	Angel Blade	Moena Shinguji / Angel Blade	OVA series	
2002–05	Full Metal Panic! series	Melissa Mao	Also Fumoffu, The Second Raid	
2002	Tokyo Mew Mew	Yomogi Aokawa		
2002	éX-Driver: Danger Zone	Nina A. Thunder	OVA series	
2002	Nurse Witch Komugi	Runa Tokisaka		
2002	Petite Princess Yucie	Sister		
2002	Ghost in the Shell: Stand Alone Complex	Yamaguchi's wife		
2002	Heat Guy J	Phia Oliveira		
2002–04	Gravion	Ayaka Shigure	Also Zwei	
2002	Piano	Akiko Nomura		
2002	Bokensha: The Man was from Spain ja:冒険者 (テレビアニメ)	Diego		
2003	Stratos 4	Ran Mikuriya		
2003	Someday's Dreamers	Yoko Morikawa		
2003	Crush Gear Nitro	Maumai, Toru Iwashimizu, Andy, Araiguma, Neya, Macha		
2003	Air Master	Other		
2003	Stellvia	Ren Renge, announcer		
2003	Zentrix	Akina		
2003	Astro Boy	Reiko		
2003	Croket!	Mirufiyu, Camembert, Sumomo, Milk, Sabaran		
2003	Last Exile	Delphine Eraclea		
2003	Scrapped Princess	Steyr		
2003	Please Twins!	Tsubaki Oribe		
2003	Saiyuki Reload	Kanan		
2003	Fullmetal Alchemist	Riza Hawkeye		
2003	Full-Blast Science Adventure – So That's How It Is	Bearon, Chiwawan		
2003	PoPoLoCrois	Leona		
2003	Gungrave	Sherry Walken, Harry (boy)		
2003–04	Peacemaker Kurogane	Akesato		
2003	R.O.D the TV	Nancy Makuhari	TV series	
2003	Chrono Crusade	Satella Harvenheit		
2004	Monkey Turn series	Arisa Jogasaki		
2004	Tetsujin 28-go	Tetsuo Shikishima		
2004	Agatha Christie's Great Detectives Poirot and Marple	Vanessa		
2004	Ninja Nonsense	Izumi		
2004	Onmyō Taisenki	Mizuki, Soma's mother		
2004	To Heart: Remember My Memories	Serio		
2004–05	Rockman EXE Stream	Tesla Magnets		
2004	Tsukuyomi: Moon Phase	Hiromi Anzai		
2004	Yu-Gi-Oh! GX	Emi Ayukawa		
2004	Mobile Suit Gundam SEED Destiny	Abby Windsor & Hilda Harken		
2004	Yakitate!! Japan	Sister Mako		
2005	Gallery Fake	Runa Tsujido		
2005	Ultimate Girls	Vivian's mother		
2005	Majime ni Fumajime: Kaiketsu Zorori	Soreinu, Hiden		
2005	MÄR	Diana, Queen, Minako		
2005–06	Honey and Clover series	Michiko Teshigawara		
2005	Eureka Seven	Talho Yūki, Maurice		
2005	Trinity Blood	Astharoshe Asran		
2005	Guyver: The Bioboosted Armor	Shizu Onuma		
2005	Capeta	Kaoru Tamaki		
2005	Hell Girl	Riho Kaifu		
2006	Ah My Buddha	Bosatsu		
2006	Rockman EXE Beast	Tesla Magnets		
2006–08	Kirarin Revolution series	Kasumi Kumoi		
2006	The Third	Meirin		
2006	Fushigiboshi no Futagohime Gyu!	Woman	Ep. 23	
2006	Silk Road Boy Yuto ja:シルクロード少年 ユート	Hammett		
2006	The Wallflower	Kyohei's mother		
2006	Artificial Insect Kabuto Borg Victory by Victory	Rebecca Goldberg		
2006	Kenichi: The Mightiest Disciple	Valkyrie		
2006–07	Pururun! Shizuku-chan series	Bloody Teacher		
2007	Getsumento Heiki Mina	Yoko Shirakiaji, Kosai announcer, Mina Shiratori		
2007	Jūsō Kikō Dancouga Nova	Isabelle Cronkite		
2007	Moonlight Mile series	Connie Wong, Steve's ex-wife, Maria		
2007	Gurren Lagann	Adiane		
2007	Skull Man	Rena Shingyoji		
2007–12	The Familiar of Zero series	Agnes Chevalier de Milan	series 2-4	
2007	Good Luck! Ninomiya-kun	Ryoko Ninomiya		
2007–08	Mobile Suit Gundam 00 series	Shirin Bakhtiar		
2007	Ghost Hound	Reika Ōtori		
2008	Hatenkō Yūgi	Noma		
2008	Noramimi ja:のらみみ	Mother		
2008	Bus Gamer	Keiko Ichinomiya		
2008	Soul Eater	Arachne		
2008	Ultraviolet: Code 044	Computer voice		
2008–10	Sekirei series	Hibiki		
2008	Hidamari Sketch x365	Juno's mother		
2008	Birdy the Mighty: Decode	Weegie Gahau		
2008	Battle Spirits: Shounen Toppa Bashin	Number 8, Guraguri, Masako-sensei		
2008	Hyakko	Tatsuki Iizuka		
2008	Tales of the Abyss	Natalia Luzu Kimlasca-Lanvaldear		
2009	The Tower of Druaga: The Sword of Uruk	Guremika		
2009	Fresh Pretty Cure!	Naoko Yamabuki		
2009	Kon'nichiwa Anne: Before Green Gables	Susan		
2009	The Guin Saga	Yana Devi		
2009	Sayonara, Zetsubou-Sensei	Miko Nezu		
2009–present	Hetalia: Axis Powers	Hungary		
2009	Battle Spirits: Shonen Gekiha Dan ja:バトルスピリッツ 少年激覇ダン	Mira		
2009	Natsu no Arashi!	Kyoko Kamigamo		
2009–10	Heaven's Lost Property series	Harpy 1	Also Forte	
2009	Anyamaru Tantei Kiruminzuu	Haruka Mikogami		
2010	Omamori Himari	Sae Kisaragi		
2010	Katanagatari	Kyoken Maniwa		
2010	Gokujō!! Mecha Mote Iinchō: Second Collection	Naomi's mother		
2010	Stitch!	Mizuki		
2010	Battle Spirits: Brave ja:バトルスピリッツ ブレイヴ	Queen Gilfam		
2010	Super Robot Wars Original Generation: The Inspector	Ouka Nagisa		
2010	Arakawa Under the Bridge*2	Nino's mother		
2010	Rita et Machin ja:リタとナントカ	Teacher		
2011	Gosick	Sophie		
2011	Tiger & Bunny	Kriem		
2011	Blade	Rubito		
2011	Nura: Rise of the Yokai Clan	Yododono, Kitsune Hagoromo (Kako)		
2011	Battle Spirits: Heroes	Chihiro's mother		
2011	Last Exile: Fam, the Silver Wing	Guzel		
2012	Ginga e Kickoff!!	Haruka Ohta		
2012	Battle Spirits: Sword Eyes	Grenada		
2012	Hidamari Sketch × Honeycomb	Yuno's mother		
2013	Hakkenden: Eight Dogs of the East series	Sayoko Inuta		
2013	Arata: The Legend	Kawa's mother		
2013	Gifu Dodo!! Kanetsugu to Keiji	Usugumo		
2014	Dragonar Academy	Lataine Manager		
2014	Tenkai Knights	Homeroom teacher, Guardian Eurosu		
2014	Hanamonogatari	Tooe Kanbaru		
2014	Aikatsu!	Karen Kurebayashi	season 3	
2014	Cross Ange: Tenshi to Ryuu no Rondo	Zola Axberg		
2016	March Comes in like a Lion	Misaki	Ep. 5,11	
2017	One Piece	Vinsmoke Reiju		
2018	Sword Gai The Animation	Arnys	ONA series	
2018	Attack on Titan	Alma	Episode 40	
2024	The Grimm Variations	Ms. B	ONA series	

=== Films ===
List of voice performances in feature films
Year	Title	Role	Notes	Source
1993	Rail of the Star お星さまのレール	Hatsue		
1993	Mother: Saigo no Shoujo Eve; Eyes of Mars	Meizadosun		
1995	Macross 7: The Galaxy Is Calling Me!	Emilia Jenius		
1996	Jigoku Sensei Nūbē	Ritsuko Takahashi		
1997	Jigoku Sensei Nūbē: Kyoufu no Natsu Yasumi! Asashi no Uni no Gensetsu	Ritsuko Takahashi		
1999	Super Doll Licca-chan: Licca-chan Zettai Zetsumei! Doll Knights no Kiseki	Doll Izumi		
2001	Initial D Third Stage	Mako Sato		
2001	Gensomaden Saiyuki Requiem: A Requiem for The One Not Chosen	Others		
2002	éX-Driver the Movie	Nina A. Thunder		
2002	6 Angels	Naomi Jones		
2005	Fullmetal Alchemist the Movie: Conqueror of Shamballa	Riza Hawkeye		
2009	Eureka Seven: Pocketful of Rainbows	Yuki Taruho		
2010	Mobile Suit Gundam 00 the Movie: A Wakening of the Trailblazer	Shirin Bakhtiar		
2011	Heaven's Lost Property the Movie: The Angeloid of Clockwork	Harpy		
2015	Crayon Shin-chan: My Moving Story! Cactus Large Attack!	Musae Koyama		
2017	Fireworks, Should We See It from the Side or the Bottom?			
2024	Mobile Suit Gundam SEED Freedom	Hilda Harken		

=== Video games ===
List of voice performances in anime
Year	Title	Role	Notes	Source
1994	Power Dolls 2	Miki Kourai	PS1/PS2	
1994	Arunamu (Alnam) no Kiba: Juuzoku juuni shinto densetsu ja:アルナムの牙 獣族十二神徒伝説	Seiron, Koran		
1995–2005	Darkstalkers series	Lei-Lei	Starting with Night Warriors: Darkstalkers' Revenge	
1995	Galaxy Fräulein Yuna II: Eternal Princess	Midori Sasaki / Koori no Midori		
1995	Metal Fighter Miku	Sayaka	Sega Saturn	
1995	Tokimeki Mahjong Paradise		3DO, Sega Saturn	
1995	Mah Jong Doukyuusei Special	Masaki Natsuko	Arcade, Sega Saturn	
1996	Tokimeki Card Paradise		PC-FX	
1996	Power Dolls FX	Fan Quanmei	PC FX	
1996	Galaxy Fräulein Yuna FX	Iron Girl		
1996	Mahjong Classmate Special	Natsuko Masaki	Sega Saturn	
1996	El-Hazard	Ishieru Soeru	Sega Saturn	
1996	Quiz Nanairo Dreams	Charlotte, Kumiko Ezaki, Rintsu	Arcade	
1996	Arc the Lad II	Shante	PS1/PS2	
1996	Soul Edge	Sophitia Alexandra	Also Ver II	
1996	Alice in Cyberland	Kato Yuko	PlayStation	
1996	Skull Fang	Sparrow, Navigation Operator	Arcade	
1997	Haunted Junction: Seitokai Batch o Oe!	Kagamiko	PS1/PS2	
1997	Ray Tracers	Maki Saito	PlayStation	
1997	Dokyusei Mahjong 同級生麻雀	Satomi Kurokawa	PS1/PS2	
1997	Jakutei: Battle Cosplayer 雀帝 バトルコスプレイヤー	Gloria	Sega Saturn	
1997	Quo Vadis: Iberukatsu Ikusaeki クォヴァディス イベルカーツ戦役	Irina Meuller		
1997	Hell Teacher Nube	Ritsuko Takahashi	PS1/PS2	
1997	Metal Angel 3 メタルエンジェル3	Kwonji Kaze, Swan	PS1/PS2	
1997	Digital Ange	Merukyuuru	Sega Saturn	
1997	Marika: Shinjitsu no Sekai ja:マリカ 〜真実の世界〜	Hamion	Sega Saturn	
1997	Bulk Slash	Metical Freya	Sega Saturn	
1997	Arc the Lad Monster Game with Casino Game ja:アークザラッド・モンスターゲーム with カジノゲーム		PS1/PS2	
1997	Chōjin heiki zeroigar 超神兵器ゼロイガー	Lulu		
1997	Super Gem Fighter Mini Mix	Lei Lei	Arcade	
1997	Tactical Fighter	Fukami Shizue	Sega Saturn	
1997	Mah Jong Gakuensai ja:麻雀学園祭	Keiko Takahashi	Sega Saturn	
1997	Mahō Gakuen Lunar!	Elie	Sega Saturn	
1997	YU-NO: A girl who chants love at the bound of this world	Kaori Asakura	Sega Saturn	
1997	Galaxy Fraulein Yuna 3: Lightning Angel	Midori Sasaki / Koori no Midori	Sega Saturn	
1997	Crime Crackers 2	Pan G	PlayStation	
1997	Soukuu no Tsubasa: Gotha World		PlayStation, Sega Saturn	
1997	Dragon Knight 4	Marlene	PlayStation	
1998	Kindaichi Shounen no Jikenbo: Hoshimitou Kanashimi no Hukushuuki 金田一少年の事件簿 星見島 悲しみの復讐鬼	Akiko Hisado	Sega Saturn	
1998	Back Guiner バックガイナー ～よみがえる勇者たち～ 覚醒編 ガイナー転生	Soka Shizuku, Kotaro (before transformation)	PS1/PS2	
1998	Xenogears	Emeralda	PS1/PS2	
1998	NOeL: La Neige	Ryo Midorikawa	PlayStation	
1998	Mitsumete Knight	Linda Zakroid	PS1/PS2	
1998	Dragon Force II: Kamisarishi Daichi ni ドラゴンフォースII 神去りし大地に	Kiri	Sega Saturn	
1998	Himitsu Sentai Metamor V	Metamoru Yellow (Tomoe Moeko)	PlayStation	
1998	Galaxy Fraulein Yuna: Final Edition	Midori Sasaki / Koori no Midori	PS1/PS2	
1998	NOeL: La Neige Special	Ryo Midorikawa	PlayStation	
1998	Princess Maker Pocket Dai-sakusen	Humming	PlayStation	
1998	Slayers Royal 2	Elena	Sega Saturn	
1998	Hoshi no Oka Gakuen Monogatari: Gakuensai ja:星の丘学園物語 学園祭	Erika Natori	PS1/PS2	
1998	Digital Figure Iina	Kawano Harumi	PlayStation	
1998	Princess Maker 3: Yumemiru Yousei	Humming, Ijimekko, Lady Rose	PlayStation	
1998	Etude prologue: Wavering form of heart ja:etude prologue 〜揺れ動く心のかたち	Kasumi Minami	Sega Saturn	
1998	Mitsumete Knight R Daibouken hen ja:みつめてナイトR 大冒険編	Linda Zakroid	PS1/PS2	
1998	Street Fighter Zero 3	Rose		
1998	Tech Romancer	Reika Amamiya	Arcade	
1999	Den'ei Shoujo -Virtual Girl Lun-	Ran	Windows	
1999	Favorite Dear	Miraiya	PS1/PS2	
1999	To Heart	Serio	PS1/PS2	
1999	Ore no Shikabane o Koete Yuke 俺の屍を越えてゆけ	Ten kara no otsuge, Wakai Musume	PS1/PS2	
1999	Soulcalibur	Sophitia Alexandra	DC	
1999	Harlem Beat -You're The One-	Shiarishi Miho	PlayStation	
1999	Revive: Sosei ja:Revive 〜蘇生〜	Reiko Takano	Also 2003 version	
2000	PoPoLoCRoIS Story II ja:ポポロクロイス物語II	Leona	PS1/PS2	
2000	Devadasy ja:創世聖紀デヴァダシー	Nazuna Nanase	PC	
2000	Brigandine	Sofia, Burangane	Grand Edition, PS1/PS2	
2000	Zutto Issho ja:ずっといっしょ	Sakurako Onodera	PS1/PS2	
2000	Blue Submarine No. 6: Antarctica	Yoko Gusuke	PS1/PS2	
2000	Khamrai		PlayStation	
2000	Mercurius Pretty End of the Century	Mahou Senshi, Izumi no seirei	Dreamcast	
2000	Blue Submarine No. 6: Saigetsu Fumahito Time and Tide	Yoko Gusuke	DC	
2001	Invincible King Tri-Zenon	Sae Uryuu	PS1/PS2	
2001	Startling Adventures: Kuusou Daibouken X 3	Maki Kondakowa	PlayStation	
2001	Lunar Wing ja:ルナ・ウイング 〜時を越えた聖戦〜	Miruka	PS1/PS2	
2001	Summon Night 2	Mimoza Lorange	PS1/PS2	
2001	Capcom vs. SNK 2	Chun Li	GameCube, PS2, Xbox	
2002	Tales of Fandom Vol.1	Amy Burklight	PS1/PS2	
2002	PoPoLoCRoIS: Adventure of Beginnings	Leona	PS1/PS2	
2002	Mizuiro	Fuyuka Ishikawa		
2003	Star Ocean: Till the End of Time Director's Cut	Maria Traydor	PS2	
2003	Soulcalibur II	Sophitia Alexandra		
2003	Tenerezza	Sharomu Shimai	PC	
2003	Sunrise World War from Sunrise Eiyuutan サンライズワールドウォー From サンライズ英雄譚	Kuwasan, Maibaru Konowa	PS1/PS2	
2003	Fullmetal Alchemist and the Broken Angel	Riza Hawkeye	PS1/PS2	
2004	Uchuu no Stellvia	Ren Renge	PS1/PS2	
2004	Gungrave: Overdose	Sherry Walken	PS1/PS2	
2004	Saiyuki Reload	Kanan	PS1/PS2	
2004	PoPoLoCRoIS: Adventure of the Law of the Moon	Leona	PS1/PS2	
2004	Fullmetal Alchemist: Dream Carnival	Riza Hawkeye	PS1/PS2	
2004	Fullmetal Alchemist 2: Curse of the Crimson Elixir	Riza Hawkeye	PS1/PS2	
2004	Sequence Palladium 2	Randy	WIN98	
2005	PoPoLoCRoIS (PSP)	Leona	PSP	
2005	Brave series	Azuki Tomonaga, Kikumaro Takano, Karura	PS1/PS2	
2005	Wild Arms 4		PlayStation 2	
2005	Baldr Force EXE	Ayane Shidou	PS1/PS2	
2005	Namco x Capcom	Lei Lei, Rose	PS1/PS2	
2005	Fullmetal Alchemist 3: Kami o Tsugu Shoujo	Riza Hawkeye	PS1/PS2	
2005	Soulcalibur III	Sophitia Alexandra		
2005	Tales of the Abyss	Natalia Luzu Kimlasca-Lanvaldear	PS2	
2006	Misuterito Yasogami Kaoru no Jiken Fairu ミステリート 八十神かおるの事件ファイル	Miyuki Nanjo	PS1/PS2	
2006	Wrestle Angels Survivor	Beauty Ichigaya, Yuki Hoshina	PS1/PS2	
2006	Tales of Phantasia	Amy Burklight	PSP, also Full voice edition	
2006	Yu-Gi-Oh! Duel Monsters GX: Tag Force	Emi Ayukawa	PSP	
2006	Crayon Shin-chan: Saikyou Kazoku Kasukabe King Wii	Musae Koyama	Wii	
2007	Tales of Fandom Vol.2	Natalia L.K. Lanvaldear	PS1/PS2	
2007	Another Century's Episode 3: The Final	Yuki Taruho	PS1/PS2	
2007	Yu-Gi-Oh! Duel Monsters GX: Tag Force 2	Emi Ayukawa	PSP	
2008	Yu-Gi-Oh! Duel Monsters GX: Tag Force 3	Emi Ayukawa	PSP	
2009	MagnaCarta 2	Claire Setiran	Xbox 360	
2009	Sekirei: Mirai Kara no Okurimono	Hibiki	PS1/PS2	
2010	Everybody's Tennis Portable	Nika	PSP	
2010	Crayon Shin-Chan: Obaka Daininden - Susume! Kasukabe Ninja Tai!	Musae Koyama	DS	
2010	Xenoblade Chronicles	Tyrea	Wii	
2010	Tales of Phantasia: Narikiri Dungeon X	Amy Burklight, Artemis	PSP	
2010	Another Century's Episode: R	Melissa Mao	PS3	
2010	Crayon Shin-Chan Shokkugan! Densetsu o Yobu Omake Daiketsusen!!	Musae Koyama	DS	
2011	Tales of the World: Radiant Mythology 3	Natalia L.K. Lanvaldear	PSP	
2011	Gakuen Hetalia Portable	Hungary	PSP	
2011	Final Fantasy XIII-2	Historia Cross Narration	PS3	
2011	Umineko no Naku Koro ni Chiru: Shinjitsu to Gensō no Nocturne	Ikuko Hachijo	PS3	
2012	Heroes Phantasia	Nancy Makuhari	PSP	
2012	Meikyū-tō-ji regashisuta 迷宮塔路レガシスタ	Reina Mindell	PS3	
2013	God Eater 2	Satsuki Takamine	PSP/Vita	
2014	Tales of the World: Reve Unitia	Natalia L.K. Lanvaldear	DS	
2015	Cross Ange: Rondo of Angels and Dragons tr.	Zola		
2023	Octopath Traveler II	Castti Florenz	PS4/PS5, PC, Nintendo Switch	

=== Audio dramas ===
List of voice performances in audio dramas
Title	Role	Notes	Source
Angel Force		CD	
Arashi no Destiny	Serasutiia	CD, volumes 1-2	
Tohshinden -Before Stage-	Emi	CD	
Calm Breaker	Chisato Arita	CD	
Can Can Bunny Extra		CD	
Cluster	Pauru Tribe	CD	
Dancing Whispers	Tenkuu no Shanmille	CD	
Dark Edge	Akasaka Miki	CD, Radio	
Digital Ange Dennou Tenshi SS	Melkyuul	Radio	
El-Hazard	Myuun	CD	
Fake	Alicia Grant	CD	
Fire Emblem		CD	
Fullmetal Alchemist series	Riza Hawkeye	Drama CDs	
Gear Fighter Dendoh	Izumo Otome	CD, File 2	
Cinematic Sound Drama GetBackers: Dakkan-ya - kaminokijutsu-hen	Maria Nochesu	Drama CDs	
Gunsmith Cats	Rally Vincent	CD	
Himitsu Sentai Metamor V		CD	
Hoshi no Oka Gakuen Monogatari Gakuensai	Natori Erika	CD, Radio, Vol. 1	
Hourai Gakuen no Hatsukoi!	Student	CD	
Jojo's Bizarre Adventure		CD, Vol. 2	
Kurokami Captured		CD	
Momoiro Sisters Office Version	Kuragata Yuki	CD	
Noel La Neige Message -Mada minu anata he-	Midorikawa Ryou	CD	
Over Rev!	Morita Sawako	CD	
Popful Mail The Next Generation	geigi	CD	
Quo Vadis		CD, Vols. 1-6	
Fam & Ihrlie	Ihrlie	CD	
Rurouni Kenshin -Meiji Kenkaku Romantan-		CD, Vol. 2	
Saiyuki		CD	
Sampaguita		CD	
Sensei ga Iroiro to Nesshin de Nemurenai CD	Iria	CD	
Trouble Shooter Sheriff Stars	Miretta	CD	
Tech Romancer	Reika Amamiya	CD	
Tsubasa: Those with Wings	Rokuro	Drama CDs	
Vandread		CD	
Yonde yaru ze!		CD, Vol. 1	

== Dubbing ==
Title	Role	Dubbing actor	Notes	Sources
Scream (1996)	Sidney Prescott	Neve Campbell		
Scream 2	Sidney Prescott	Neve Campbell		
54	Julie Black	Neve Campbell		
Three to Tango	Amy Post	Neve Campbell		
Scream 3	Sidney Prescott	Neve Campbell		
Panic	Sarah	Neve Campbell		
The Company	Loretta Ryan	Neve Campbell		
Scream 4	Sidney Prescott	Neve Campbell		
Skyscraper	Sarah Sawyer	Neve Campbell		
Scream (2022)	Sidney Prescott	Neve Campbell		
Scream 7	Sidney Prescott	Neve Campbell		
Antarctic Journal	Yoo-jin	Kang Hye-jung		
Bandidas	María Álvarez	Penélope Cruz		
Body of Lies	Aisha	Golshifteh Farahani		
Broadchurch	Beth Latimer	Jodie Whittaker		
Clueless	Dionne Davenport	Stacey Dash		
Date Movie	Julia Jones	Alyson Hannigan		
Dead Man Down	Beatrice Louzon	Noomi Rapace		
D.E.B.S.	Amy Bradshaw	Sara Foster		
DodgeBall: A True Underdog Story	Katherine "Kate" Veatch	Christine Taylor		
Driven	Sophia Simone	Estella Warren	2005 NTV edition	
Last Days	Nicole	Nicole Vicius		
My Life Without Me	Ann	Sarah Polley		
Minority Report	Agatha Lively	Samantha Morton		
Saw 3D	Joyce	Gina Holden		
Scary Movie	Cindy Campbell	Anna Faris		
Seed of Chucky	Joan	Hannah Spearritt		
Sympathy for Mr. Vengeance	Cha Yeong-mi	Bae Doona		
The Transporter	Lai Kwai	Shu Qi		
