= Battle Arena Toshinden (OVA) =

Two-part original video animation based on the video game series of the same name

- DVD cover of Battle Arena Toshinden by US Manga Corps

闘神伝 (Toushinden)
- Genre: Martial arts
- Original video animation
- Directed by: Masami Ōbari
- Produced by: Yoshiki Murase; Yasufumi Yoritsune
- Written by: Masaharu Omiya (1); Haruo Takayama (2)
- Music by: Kensuke Shiina
- Studio: Animate Film; J.C.Staff (Cooperation)
- Licensed by: NA: US Manga Corps
- Released: June 21, 1996 – August 21, 1996
- Runtime: 27 minutes
- Episodes: 2

Battle Arena Toshinden (闘神伝, Toushinden) is a two-part original video animation based on the video game series of the same name by Takara. It was directed by Masami Ōbari and produced by Animate Film. Released in 1996, the film is based primarily on the events of Battle Arena Toshinden 2, but incorporates elements from the first and third games in the series.

== Plot ==
=== Part 1 ===
In the final round of the Battle Arena Toshinden tournament, Eiji Shinjo faces the tournament's sponsor, Gaia, in a final duel. Gaia mentions that Eiji's skills are comparable to those of his long-lost brother, Sho, but before he can explain, the fight is interrupted by a man called Chaos, who works for the same Organization as Gaia and has been sent to eliminate him upon discovering that Gaia is rallying fighters to overthrow the Organization. Gaia slays Chaos and flees, leaving the tournament without a winner.

A year later, both Sho and Chaos, the latter having apparently survived his fight with Gaia, working for the Organization's leader, Lady Uranus, begin hunting down the fighters from the tournament, such as Fo Fai, Rungo Iron and Mondo. Eiji, along with his best friend Kayin Amoh, split up to warn the other competitors. Eiji meets up with Sofia, an amnesiac agent and personal friend of his, and explains the situation to her. That night, however, Uranus takes control of Sofia's mind and has her try to kill Eiji, but Eiji fights back and breaks Uranus's hold on her. Sho himself then appears and does battle with Eiji, quickly gaining the upper hand, but Eiji discovers that Sho is actually a machine and overpowers him. Uranus appears and destroys Sho, goading Eiji before taking her leave. Enraged, Eiji vows to take Uranus and the Organization down.

=== Part 2 ===
Eiji and Kayin meet up with another competitor, Ellis, and warn her of the danger. Believing she may be slain, Eiji and Kayin set a trap for Chaos and surprise him when he arrives. Gaia appears and fights Chaos again, and in the process, Ellis deduces from Gaia's pendant that Gaia is her long-lost father. Chaos blinds Gaia with gas and aims poison-tipped darts at him, but Ellis jumps in the way and is poisoned. Chaos smugly informs them that only the Organization has the antidote and flees back to the base, knowing that Gaia will likely seek him and Uranus out in revenge. After Ellis is hospitalised, Eiji, Kayin, Gaia and Sofia, with help from a policewoman, Tracy, launch an all-out assault on Uranus's base, aided by Rungo, Fo, Mondo and Duke B. Rambert, the other fighters from the tournament. Gaia locates and fights Chaos again while Eiji finds and destroys the facility where the copies of Sho are being created. Eiji and Kayin aid Gaia and eventually destroy Chaos once and for all. They confront Uranus in the throne room, where Uranus tells them that the facility was only a decoy, and the true one is beneath the base. The real Sho appears and defies Uranus, informing her that he has destroyed the real facility, which has caused the base to start collapsing. After swearing revenge, Uranus flees. Eiji, Kayin and Gaia make it out of the base before it explodes, but Sho is nowhere to be found.

The participants part ways on good terms. In a secluded area, Sho, who also survived, silently compliments his brother's improved skills. Meanwhile, Eiji and Kayin deliver the antidote to Ellis and she makes a full recovery. As Eiji walks home, he is confronted by a mysterious, gun-wielding warrior, Vermillion, and the film ends as they prepare to fight.

== Voice cast ==
Character	Japanese voice actor	English dubbing actor
Eiji Shinjo	Tomokazu Seki	Ted Lewis
Kayin Amoh	Takehito Koyasu	Hideo Seaver
Gaia	Daisuke Gōri	Alfred DeButler
Sho Shinjo	Bin Shimada	Chris Yates
Chaos	Fumihiko Tachiki	Chris Yates
Lady Uranus	Kikuko Inoue	Emma Rayda
Sofia	Yumi Tōma	Debora Rabbai
Rungo Iron	Shinpachi Tsuji	Greg Wolfe
Fo Fai	Ikuo Nishikawa	Carter Cathcart
Mondo	Yukimasa Kishino	Kim Carrell
Duke B. Rambert	Kaneto Shiozawa	Bill Timoney (as Billy Regan)
Ellis	Kyōko Hikami	Lisa Ortiz
Tracy	Michiko Neya	Apollo Smile
Christopher	unknown	Terri Muuss

== Release ==
In the North America market, Central Park Media released the anime on VHS in two versions: an uncut version and an edited PG-13 version, with the latter omitting the nudity and graphic content of the former. The Region 1 DVD releases are of the uncut version only. It was released on LaserDisc in Japan.

The theme song performed by Kyōko Hikami, titled "Makenaide! Fly Away!", was issued as a single by Sony Music on May 22, 1996.

== Reception ==
Mike Toole of Anime Jump said: "Overall, Toshinden is a fighting-game OVA with a rotten story, good animation that turns bad halfway through, and a writing team that has no idea what to do with the characters." THEM Anime Reviews wrote: "Whenever I make a statement that "so-and-so" is the worst anime I have ever seen, along comes something that blows it completely out of the water in terms of badness." Anime on DVD said: "Overall, I'd say this disc is for completists (like myself) only, or true fans of the game." In their review for a re-release they wrote: "Toshinden has earned itself a place in history though, for better or worse. It's one of the least surprising titles to get a rerelease considering its origins and how much has changed since then. But it's still not a title that I'd really recommend unless you're still living in the mid 90's."
