= Yumi Tōma =

Japanese voice actress, author, and singer

- Born: Yumi Nakagawa; December 20, 1966 (age 59); Chiba, Chiba Prefecture, Japan
- Other name: Yumi Touma
- Occupations: Voice actress; narrator; singer
- Years active: 1986–present
- Agent(s): ALLURE&Y
- Spouse: Tatsuya Yoshida
- Website: allure-y.jp

Yumi Nakagawa (中川 由美, Nakagawa Yumi; born December 20, 1966), known professionally as Yumi Tōma (冬馬 由美, Tōma Yumi), is a Japanese voice actress, narrator, author and singer from Chiba. She has been part of the singing group Goddess Family Club. Tōma once worked for Aoni Production before she founded her own agency ALLURE&Y. Because of her mature voice, she often plays strong and beautiful women. Tōma is married to Toei Company producer Tatsuya Yoshida.

== Voice roles ==
=== TV animation ===
- Dragon Ball (1986–1987) – Girl (ep. 28), Young Girl (ep. 45), Boy (ep. 79)
- City Hunter 2 (1988) – Misa Williams (eps. 17–18)
- Dragon Ball Z (1989) – Attendant (ep. 14), Rom (ep. 16)
- Chimpui (1989–1991) – Noriko Unaki (ep. 49)
- Magical Taruruto-kun (1990–92) – Iyona Kawai
- 21 Emon (1991–1992) – Luna
- Dragon Quest: The Adventure of Dai (1991–1992) – Gome-chan
- Mobile Suit Victory Gundam (1993) – Kalinga Wogel, Elena
- Miracle Girls (1993) – Emma Winston (Second)
- Sailor Moon R (1993) – Ann / Natsumi Ginga
- Tonde Burin (1994) – Buritī Koizumi
- Magic Knight Rayearth (1994–95) – Hasegawa-senpai (ep. 9), Young Ferio (ep. 16)
- Fushigi Yūgi (1995) – Yui Hongo, Tama
- Mobile Suit Gundam Wing (1995) – Mrs. Dorian, Sally Po
- City Hunter: Goodbye My Sweetheart (1997) – Opera Member A
- Detective Conan (1997, 2003–2004, 2007, 2010, 2014, 2021) – Hitomi Sasaki (ep. 67), Young Jodie Starling (eps. 343–345), Tomomi Ichikura (ep. 475), Nami Kasakura (eps. 568–569), Nao Takiguchi (ep. 750), Maika Zenda (eps. 1011–1012)
- Clamp School Detectives (1997) – Itsuki
- Pokémon (1997) – Satsuki
- Adventures of Mini-Goddess (1998) – Urd
- Cowboy Bebop (1998) – Wen (ep. 6)
- Yu-Gi-Oh! (1998) – Kaoruko Himekoji (first series only), Shimizu
- Cardcaptor Sakura (1999) – Spinel Sun
- Inuyasha (2002) – Toran (eps. 75–77)
- .hack//Sign (2002) – Helba
- Air (2005) – Hijiri Kirishima
- Ah! My Goddess (2005) – Urd
- Emma – A Victorian Romance (2005) – Emma
- Emma – A Victorian Romance: Second Act (2007) – Emma
- Natsuyuki Rendezvous (2012) – Miho Shimao
- Altair: A Record of Battles (2017) – Nilüfer Fatma
- Fist of the Blue Sky: Regenesis (2018) – Pān Yù-Líng
- Kaginado (2021–22) – Hijiri Kirishima
- 7th Time Loop: The Villainess Enjoys a Carefree Life Married to Her Worst Enemy! (2024) – Mihaela Laure Wehrmann (eps. 8–9)
- Drops of God (2026) – Akie (ep. 6)

Unknown date

- After War Gundam X – Særia Sou (ep. 15)
- Angelique ~Kokoro no Mezameru Toki~ – Mel
- Alice SOS – Yukari Ashikawa
- Atashin'chi – English Teacher
- Baby Felix – young Felix
- Beyblade – Dr. Judy Mizuhara
- Black Jack 21 – Benitokage
- Boyfriend – Megumi Hanyu
- Brain Powerd – Nakki Gaizu
- The Brave of Gold Goldran – Lady Licca The Legendra
- The Brave Fighter of Legend Da-Garn – Yamamoto Pink, Lady Pinkie, Magical Pinkie
- Cinderella Boy – Rela Cindy Shirayuki
- Cho Mashin Hero Wataru – Phoenix of Flame
- Cooking Papa – Yumeko Kimura, Bei, Chie, Kūgo Nekota
- Doraemon – Natsumi Gotō
- Esper Mami – Chiaki, Chisato (ep. 115), Children, Boy
- Firestorm – Gina
- Flint the Time Detective – T.P. Lady.
- Jikū Tantei Genshi-kun – TP Lady/Akira Aino
- Gokinjo Monogatari – Mariko Nakasu
- Girls und Panzer – Shiho Nishizumi
- Gun Frontier – Yoneko
- Hero Bank – Momiji Murayama
- High School Mystery: Gakuen Nanafushigi – Fumiko Shirahata
- Hime-chan's Ribbon – Yuka Hijiri
- Himitsu no Akko-chan – Fujiko-sensei, Kyoko Tanaka
- Jormungand – Chiquita
- Jushin Liger – Sanae, Aki
- Kamisama Kazoku – Misa Kamiyama
- Karakuri Zōshi Ayatsuri Sakon – Hazuki Funabashi
- Kirby: Right Back at Ya! – Rōrin-sensei
- Kiteretsu Daihyakka – Otonashi (Second), Namiyo, Telephone's Voice
- Kokoro Library – Rie Mochima
- Kurokami: The Animation – Punipuni, Shinobu Nanase
- Lost Universe – Stella
- Madō King Granzort – Taka
- Mama wa Shōgaku 4 Nensei – Minako Yamaguchi
- Master Keaton – Natalia-Sensei
- Mobile Fighter G Gundam – Princess Maria Louise
- Monkey Turn – Aki Koike
- Moyashimon – Aspergillius oryzae
- Najica Blitz Tactics – Hiiragi Najika
- Neighborhood Story – Mariko Nakasu, Kuro
- Noir – Silvana Greone
- Phoenix – Tamami
- Pitaten – Nyaa
- Pokémon: Advanced Generation – Mitsuko
- Porphy no Nagai Tabi – Romane
- Powerpuff Girls Z – Kinosaki-sensei
- Remi, Nobody's Girl – Arthur
- Romeo's Blue Skies – Hanna
- Saint Seiya – Young Shun, Hyoga and Akira
- Sazae-san – Kayo
- School Rumble ni Gakki – Iori the cat in episode 21
- s-CRY-ed – Banka
- Shinkai Densetsu Meremanoid – Misty Jo
- Slayers – Sylphiel Nels Lahda
- Steel Angel Kurumi – Michael
- Super Robot Wars Original Generation: Divine Wars – Aya Kobayashi
- The Laughing Salesman – Asako Kariya
- The Wallflower – Sayuri
- The World of Narue – Haruna
- Transformers: Super-God Masterforce – Go Shooter
- Turn A Gundam – Teteth Halleh, Linda Halleh
- The Twelve Kingdoms – Ren Rin
- xxxHOLiC Kei – Jorougumo
- Xenosaga: The Animation – Nephilim
- Yawara! A Fashionable Judo Girl – Kyōko Hikage (Kyon Kyon)
- Yumeiro Patissiere – Harue Kirishima

=== ONA ===
- Tekken: Bloodline (2022) – Nina Williams

=== OVA ===
- Bubblegum Crisis (1988, 1990) – Interviewer (ep. 5), Lou (ep. 7)
- Super Mario's Fire Brigade (1989) – Tetsuya
- Crying Freeman (1988) – Mitsuko (ep. 1)
- Project A-ko 4: FINAL (1989) – Student A
- Record of Lodoss War (1990) – Deedlit
- Mobile Suit SD Gundam Mark IV (1990) – Alpha Azieru, Amuro Ray (young)
- Detonator Orgun (1991) – Michi Kanzaki
- Ninja Ryūkenden (1991) – Irene Lew
- Dark Cat (1991) – Takako Asagaya
- The Super Dimension Fortress Macross II: Lovers, Again (1992) – Silvie Gena
- Ushio & Tora (1992) – Mayuko Inoue
- Oh My Goddess! (1993–94) – Urd, Belldandy (child)
- Robot Hunter Casshern (1993) – Luna Kozuki
- Please Save My Earth (1993) – Rin Kobayashi
- Ranma ½ (1994) – Hinako Ninomiya (ep. 4)
- Maps (1994) – Lipumira Gweiss
- Sailor Victory (1995) – Reiko Takagi
- Iczer Girl Iczelion (1994) – Nami Shiina
- Galaxy Fraulein Yuna (1995) – Polylina
- Voltage Fighter Gowcaizer (1996) – Shaia Hishizaki
- Tekken: The Motion Picture (1998) – Jun Kazama
- Street Fighter Zero: The Animation (1999) – Chun-Li
- Interlude (2004) – Haruka Fujinobe
- Tales of Symphonia The Animation: Sylvarant Episode (2007) – Raine Sage
- Ranma ½: Nightmare! Incense of Spring Sleep (2008) – Hinako Ninoniya
- Tales of Symphonia The Animation: Tethe'alla Episode (2010–11) – Raine Sage
- Tales of Symphonia The Animation: The United World Episode (2011–12) – Raine Sage

Unknown date

- .hack//Liminality – Asaba
- Fushigi Yūgi – Yui Hongo
- Futari Ecchi – Kyōko Ōmiya
- Future GPX Cyber Formula – Clair Fortlan
- Geobreeders: Breakthrough – Yoko Fukami
- Halo Legends – Cortana (Origins)
- Inferious Wakusei Senshi Gaiden Condition Green – Bernie Page, Candy
- Pichu and Pikachu – Pichu
- Power Dolls: Omuni Senki 2540 – Yao Feilun
- Marriage – Reiko
- Re: Cutie Honey – Black Claw
- Shonan Junai Gumi – Momoko Shirayuki
- Super Robot Wars Original Generation: The Animation – Aya Kobayashi
- Tenchi Muyo! – Tokimi
- Ushio & Tora: Comically Deformed Theater – Mayuko Inoue
- Voogie's Angel – Teddy the Bear

=== Movies ===
- Saint Seiya: Evil Goddess Eris (1987) – Akira
- City Hunter: Bay City Wars (1990) – News Caster
- City Hunter: Million Dollar Conspiracy (1990) – Hinako
- Mobile Suit Gundam F91 (1991) – Cecily Fairchild
- Dragon Quest: The Adventure of Dai - Stand Up!! Avan's Disciples (1992) – Gomechan
- Dragon Quest: The Adventure of Dai - Destroy!! The Reborn 6 Commanders (1992) – Gomechan
- Pretty Soldier Sailor Moon R: The Movie (1993) – Xenian Flower
- Slam Dunk: Shohoku's Greatest Challenge! (1995) – Eri Fujisawa
- Neighborhood Story (1996) – Mariko Nakasu
- City Hunter: Goodbye My Sweetheart (1997) – Performer A
- Gundam Wing: Endless Waltz -Special Edition- (1998) – Sally Po
- Pocket Monsters the Movie: Revelation Lugia (1999) – Freezer
- Ah! My Goddess: The Movie (2000) – Urd
- Air (2005) – Hijiri Kirishima
- Girls und Panzer der Film (2015) – Shiho Nishizumi

=== Video games ===
Year	Title	Role	Notes	Source
1994	Ranma ½: Chougi Rambuhen	Hinako Ninomiya		
1994	Tekken	Nina Williams		
1995	Voltage Fighter Gowcaizer	Shaia Hishizaki		
1996	Puyo Puyo CD Tsu	Rulue		
1996	Dead or Alive	Leifang		
1996	Shin Super Robot Wars	Aya Kobayashi, Kalinga Wogel, Ikue Sunahara, Midori Fujiyama		
1997	Tekken 3	Ling Xiaoyu, Nina Williams, Anna Williams		
1997	Grandia	Nana		
1998	Soulcalibur	Ivy Valentine		
1998	Xenogears	Elhaym van Houten		
1999	Dead or Alive 2	Leifang		
1999	The Legend of Dragoon	Rose		
2000	RPG Tsukūru 2000 sample game: Hanayome no Kammuri	Yuria		
2000	Super Robot Wars Alpha	Aya Kobayashi, Cecily Fairchild		
2000	Air	Hijiri Kirishima		
2001	Super Robot Wars Alpha Gaiden	Aya Kobayashi		
2001	Everybody's Golf 3	Layla		
2001	Metal Gear Solid 2: Sons of Liberty	Fortune		
2001	Dead or Alive 3	Leifang		
2002	Xenosaga Episode I: Der Wille zur Macht	Nephilim		
2002–03	.hack series	Helba, Gardenia, Emma Wielat		
2002	Soulcalibur II	Ivy Valentine		
2003	Dead or Alive Xtreme Beach Volleyball	Leifang		
2003	Super Robot Wars Alpha 2	Berah Ronah		
2003	Tales of Symphonia	Raine Sage, Noishu		
2003	DreamMix TV World Fighters	Aska		
2004	Shin Megami Tensei: Digital Devil Saga	Argilla		
2004	Tekken 5	Ling Xiaoyu		
2005	Shin Megami Tensei: Digital Devil Saga 2	Argilla		
2005	Super Robot Wars Alpha 3	Aya Kobayashi		
2005	Soulcalibur III	Ivy Valentine		
2005	Dead or Alive 4	Leifang		
2006	Valkyrie Profile 2: Silmeria	Lenneth		
2006	Xenosaga Episode III: Also sprach Zarathustra	Nephilim		
2006	Dead or Alive Xtreme 2	Leifang		
2007	Super Robot Wars: Original Generations	Aya Kobayashi		
2007	Bladestorm: The Hundred Years' War	Joan of Arc		
2008	Tales of Symphonia: Dawn of the New World	Raine Sage		
2008	Sands of Destruction	Muffy		
2011	Dead or Alive: Dimensions	Leifang		
2011	Queen's Gate: Spiral Chaos	Ivy Valentine		
2011	Warriors Orochi 3	Joan of Arc		
2012	Street Fighter X Tekken	Ling Xiaoyu		
2012	Devil Summoner: Soul Hackers	Naomi, Mayone		
2012	Dead or Alive 5	Leifang		
2018	Super Robot Wars X	Cecily Fairchild		
2018	Dead or Alive Xtreme Venus Vacation	Leifang		
2019	Dead or Alive 6	Leifang		
2019	Warriors Orochi 4: Ultimate	Joan of Arc		
2021	Super Robot Wars 30	Aya Kobayashi		
2022	Valkyrie Elysium	Narrator		
2023	Honkai: Star Rail	Yukong		
2024	MOBILE SUIT GUNDAM U.C. ENGAGE	Cecily Fairchild		
2024	Wizardry Variants Daphne			
2026	Azur Lane	HMS Hood		
2026	Final Fantasy Resonance	The Will of Light		

- Hellfire S: The Another Story (1991) – Kaoru Togo
- Lady Phantom (1991) – Cindy Matsunaga
- Sol-Feace (1991) – Misao Hatataka
- Cosmic Fantasy 3: Bōken Shōnen Rei (1992) – Mai
- Tekken (1994) – Nina Williams, Anna Williams
- Tekken 2 (1995) – Nina Williams, Anna Williams
- Doki Doki Pretty League (1997) – Mayumi Asai
- Eberouge (1997) – Castele Andalsia
- Langrisser I & II (1997) – Narm
- Tekken Tag Tournament (1999) – Ling Xiaoyu, Nina Williams, Anna Williams
- Tekken 4 (2001) – Ling Xiaoyu
- Tekken Advance (2001) – Ling Xiaoyu, Nina Williams
- Castlevania: Lament of Innocence (2003) – Sara Trantoul
- Jak II: Renegade (2004) – Tess (Japanese dub)
- Xenoaga Episode II: Jenseits von Gut und Böse (2004) – Nephilim
- Mobile Suit Gundam SEED: Owaranai Ashita e (2004) – Jane Houston
- Tekken 6 (2007) – Ling Xiaoyu
- Dead or Alive: Paradise (2010) – Leifang
- Tekken 3D: Prime Edition (2012) – Ling Xiaoyu
- Sonic Lost World (2013) – Zeena

Unknown date

- Air – Hijiri Kirishima
- Angelique Etoile – Mel
- Angelique Special 2 – Mel, the fortuneteller
- Angelique Trois – Mel
- Bōkoku no Aegis 2035: Warship Gunner – Satomi Kikumasa
- Device Reign – Yuri Saeki
- Exodus Guilty Neos – Rirīnu, Reiruru
- Farland Story: Yotsu no Fūin – Elenore
- Galaxy Fräulein Yuna – Liabert von Neuestein, Yoko Mizuno
- Granblue Fantasy – Heles
- Hataraku Shōjo: Tekipaki Workin' Love – Pāpkin Naomi Koshigaya
- Interlude – Haruka Tonobe
- Jak 3 – Tess (Japanese dub)
- Jak X: Combat Racing – Tess (Japanese dub)
- Kono Yo no Hate de Koi wo Utau Shōjo YU-NO – Mio Shimazu
- Marvel: Ultimate Alliance – Elektra, Enchantress (Japanese dub)
- Marvel: Ultimate Alliance 2 – Jean Grey (Japanese dub)
- Mitsumete Knight – Raizze Haimer, Luna
- Next King: Koi no Sennen Ōkoku – Chamomile Artichoke
- Policenauts – Anna Brown
- Power Dolls 2 – Anita Sheffield
- Power Dolls FX – Yao Feilun
- Puyo Puyo CD – Rulue
- Radiata Stories – Valkyrie
- Senkutsu Katsuryū Taisen Chaos Seed – Wan Sōgen, Kō Meihon
- The Legend of Heroes II: Prophecy of the Moonlight Witch (Sega Saturn version) – Sharla, Stella
- Sotsugyō series – Reiko Takashiro
- Star Ocean: Till the End of Time – Lenneth
- Super Chase Criminal Termination – Nancy
- Super Robot Wars series – Aya Kobayashi, Cecily Fairchild, Vera Rona
- Tactics Ogre – Kachua Powell
- Trauma Center: New Blood – Valerie Baylock
- Vampire Hunter D – Charlotte
- Valkyrie Profile – Lenneth Valkyrie, Platina
- Ys IV: The Dawn of Ys – Karna

=== Drama CDs ===
Unknown date

- Dengeki CD Bunko EX Vampire ~Night Warriors~ – Morrigan Aensland
- Dengeki CD Bunko ~ Best Game Selection 13 ~ The King of Fighters '94 – King
- Samurai Shodown Dengeki drama CD series – Charlotte Christine de Colde
- Fushigi Yūgi Genbu Kaiden – Rimudo's mother
- Inferious Wakusei Senshi Gaiden Condition Green – Bernie Page, Candy
- Kamaitachi no Yoru Drama CD (Mari
- Madara Tenshōhen – Fukuhime Kirin
- Popful Mail The Next Generation – Gaw
- Popful Mail Paradise – Gaw
- Street Fighter II Drama CD – Chun-Li
- Tales of Symphonia: Drama CD Vol.2 – Raine Sage
- TARAKO Pappara Paradise – Gaw
- Zombie-ya Reiko – Saki Yurikawa

=== Dubbing ===
==== Live-action ====
- 2 Days in the Valley – Becky Foxx (Teri Hatcher)
- 24 – Sarah Warner (Sarah Wynter)
- 10,000 BC (2011 TV Asahi version) – Evolet (Camilla Belle)
- American Graffiti (2011 Blu-Ray edition) – Laurie Henderson (Cindy Williams)
- Baby's Day Out – Gilbertine (Cynthia Nixon)
- Brokedown Palace – Alice (Claire Daines)
- Casino Royale (TV Asahi version) – Vesper Lynd (Eva Green)
- Charmed – Piper Halliwell (Holly Marie Combs)
- Contagion – Lenora Orantes (Marion Cotillard)
- Crazy Heart – Jean Craddock (Maggie Gyllenhaal)
- CSI: Crime Scene Investigation – Sofia Curtis (Louise Lombard)
- Dark Angel (DVD version) – Max Guevera (Jessica Alba)
- Final Destination (2002 TV Asahi edition) – Clear Rivers (Ali Larter)
- Final Destination 2 (2006 TV Tokyo edition) – Clear Rivers (Ali Larter)
- Genius – Olga Khokhlova (Sofia Doniants)
- Goodbye Christopher Robin – Daphne de Sélincourt (Margot Robbie)
- Growing Pains – Carol Seaver (Tracey Gold)
- Inception (2012 TV Asahi version) – Mal Cobb (Marion Cotillard)
- Iron Man 2 (2012 TV Asahi version) – Natasha Romanova / Black Widow (Scarlett Johansson)
- Jackie Brown – Melanie Ralston (Bridget Fonda)
- Kiss of Death – Kay Rousseau (Louise Lombard)
- Ladder 49 – Linda Morrison
- Lights Out – Sophie (Maria Bello)
- Mad Men – Betty Draper (January Jones)
- Magnolia – Stanley Spector (Jeremy Blackman)
- Project Runway – Nina García
- Ray Donovan – Abby Donovan (Paula Malcomson)
- Shinjuku Incident – Xiu Xiu / Yuko Eguchi (Xu Jinglei)
- The Gift – Jessica King (Katie Holmes)
- The Golden Compass (TV Asahi version) – Serafina Pekkala (Eva Green)
- The Invasion – Carol Bennell (Nicole Kidman)
- The West Wing – Katie Witt (Kris Murphy)
- The Young Victoria – Harriet Sutherland (Rachael Stirling)
- Third Watch – Sgt. Maritza Cruz (Tia Texada)
- Titanic (2003 Nippon TV version) – Rose (Kate Winslet)
- Talk to Me – Sue (Miranda Otto)
- Who Am I? (TV Tokyo version) – Christine Stark (Michelle Ferre)
- Young Sheldon – Mary Cooper (Zoe Perry)
- Zoey's Extraordinary Playlist – Maggie Clarke (Mary Steenburgen)

==== Animation ====
- Encanto – Julieta Madrigal
- Happy Feet – Norma Jean
- Moomins on the Riviera – Audrey Glamour
- Charlotte's Web 2: Wilbur's Great Adventure – Nellie
- Stressed Eric – Liz Feeble, Mrs Perfect, Various

== Bibliography ==
- Oh My Goddess! -First End- (2006 Japanese) ISBN 4-06-347003-2, (2007 English translation) ISBN 978-1-59582-137-9
