= Jessica Calvello =

American voice actress

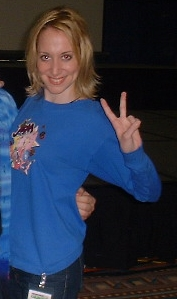
- Calvello at the 2002 Ohayocon
- Other names: Zoe Fries; Syndi Snackwell; Kandi Snackwell
- Occupation: Voice actress
- Website: jessicacalvello.com

Jessica Calvello is an American voice actress and production assistant primarily known for her anime voiceover work and also known for her non-anime voice work on a number of animated shorts. Some of her more well known roles are Excel in Excel Saga, Nanael in Queen's Blade, Kanako Miyamae in Maria Holic, Zoe Hange in Attack on Titan and Honey Kisaragi in New Cutey Honey, in which she was personally cast by the creator of the Cutey Honey franchise, Go Nagai, a role that Calvello describes as her most cherished and honored accomplishment.

== Filmography ==
=== Anime ===
- Alien Nine - Kasumi Tomine
- Amagi Brilliant Park - Tiramy
- Angel Blade - Hasumi and Emily
- Arcade Gamer Fubuki - Hanako Kokobuji – As Zoe Fries
- Aria - Aika S. Granzchesta
- Assemble Insert - Maron Namikaze
- Attack on Titan - Zoe Hange
- Blue Seed - Miyako, Yukiko (Ep. 7)
- Boogiepop Phantom - Moto Tonomura, Poom Poom
- Brynhildr in the Darkness - Kotori Takatori
- Comic Party - Eimi Ohba
- Compiler - Assembler
- Cutie Honey Universe - Honey Kisaragi / Cutie Honey
- Demon Fighter Kocho - Kocho Enoki
- Detonator Orgun - Kumi Jefferson/Mhiku
- Dirty Pair OAV - Yuri
- DNA² - Karin Aoi
- Dog & Scissors - Natsuno Kirihime
- Dragon Half - Mink
- Emma – A Victorian Romance - Eleanor Campbell
- Excel Saga - Excel (Eps. 1–13)
- Fairy Tail the Movie: Phoenix Priestess - Éclair
- Gall Force - Spea (Movies 2–3), Anne (Earth Chapter)
- Gatchaman Crowds - Hajime Ichinose
- Genshiken - Keiko Sasahara
- Girls und Panzer - Saori Takabe
- Gokudo - Djin (Female, Eps. 9–12), Nanya
- Hells - Rinne's Mother
- His and Her Circumstances - Tsukino Miyazawa
- Hitorijime My Hero - Megumi
- I Dream of Mimi - Performa
- Ikki Tousen - Ekitoku Chouhi
- Infinite Stratos II - Tatenashi Sarashiki
- Kimagure Orange Road: Summer's Beginning - Hikaru
- K.O. Beast - S.P. Icegal
- Kujibiki Unbalance - President Ritsuko Kubel Kettenkrad
- Labyrinth of Flames - Natsu
- Legend of Himiko - Seika
- Life Lessons with Uramichi Oniisan - Utano Tadano
- Magical DoReMi - Ellie Craft, Drona
- Maria Holic - Kanako Miyamae
- Munto - Toche
- New Cutie Honey - Honey Kisaragi / Cutey Honey
- One Piece - Carmel
- Patlabor: The TV Series - Kiyama (Ep. 16)
- Pokémon - Kay, the Raichu Trainer (Ep. 90)
- Pop Team Epic - Pipimi (Ep. 10a)
- Problem Children are Coming from Another World, aren't they? - Black Rabbit
- Princess Minerva - Princess Minerva
- Queen's Blade - Nanael
- Re: Cutie Honey - Honey Kisaragi / Cutie Honey
- Rozen Maiden Zurücksplen - Suigintou
- Ruin Explorers - Fam
- Sex Demon Queen - Rima
- Shingu: Secret of the Stellar Wars - Yukari Morimura, TV Reporter
- Slayers: The Motion Picture - Meliroon
- Sohryuden: Legend of the Dragon Kings - Matsuri Toba, Eri Asada
- Space Pirate Mito - Kafuko, Miss Okubo
- Spectral Force - Hiro
- The World God Only Knows - Haqua du Lot Herminium (Season 3, OVAs)
- Those Who Hunt Elves - Celsia Marie Claire (eps. 1–13)
- To Heart - Shiho
- Ushio to Tora - Asako Nakamura (OVAs)
- UQ Holder! - Ku Fei
- Virgin Fleet - Ise Haruoshimi, Shiokaze Umino
- Virus Buster Serge - Donna, Yui-Lin Manus
- The World of Narue - Narumi Mutuski, Rin Asakura – As Zoe Fries

=== Live-action dubbing ===
- Beautiful Hunter - Shion
- Beautiful Prey - Noriko
- Big Boobs Buster - Masako
- The Bondage Master - Reiko
- The Dimension Travelers - Mayumi Iwase
- Zero Woman: The Accused - Reiko Sato

=== Animation ===
- GoGoRiki - Olgariki
- Battleseed

=== Video games ===
- Street Fighter V - Yamato Nadeshiko
- Tycoon City: New York

=== Web ===
- Cyanide & Happiness - Susan Furrabruisin (The Weatherman short)
- Cyanide & Happiness - Meg (Going Down short)
- Cyanide & Happiness - Woman (Sad Larry In Love short)
- Cyanide & Happiness - Mom (Dinner With the Parents short)
- Cyanide & Happiness - Lucy (Master Dater Series)
- Hellsing Ultimate Abridged - Rip van Winkle (Episode 4)

== Production credits ==
=== Production assistant ===
- Comic Party
- Gravitation
- K.O. Beast
- Madara
- Shingu: Secret of the Stellar Wars
