= Virus (1997 video game) =

- Developer: Hudson Soft
- Publisher: Hudson Soft
- Platform: Sega Saturn
- Release: JP: August 22, 1997
- Genre: Action-adventure
- Mode: Single-player video game

Virus is a video game developed and published by Hudson Soft for the Sega Saturn. It was adapted into an anime series named Virus Buster Serge.

== Gameplay ==
Virus is a game that features a mix of animation drawn using an anime style and computer graphics.

== Development ==
Virus was developed as a collaborative project involving Hudson Soft, Sega and Avex. Sega's 1997 Sega Saturn Perfect Catalogue described the game as a "hybrid adventure", combining science-fiction storytelling with animated and computer-generated sequences.

== Reception ==
Next Generation reviewed the Saturn version of the game, rating it two stars out of five, and stated that "Even if expectations surrounding this game weren't so high, Hudson has failed to please in almost every respect. If Virus is the disease, then someone should work to find a vaccine, and fast."

== Reviews ==
- Game.EXE #11 (Nov 1997)
- Computer Gaming World #166 (May 1998)
- Joypad Oct 1997
