= Platinumhugen Ordian =

Japanese anime television series

銀装騎攻オーディアン (Ginsou Kikou Oodian)
- Genre: Science fiction, Mecha
- Anime television series
- Directed by: Masami Ōbari
- Produced by: Shinichi Ikeda; Masaru Nagai
- Written by: Kengo Asai
- Music by: Toshiyuki Omori
- Studio: Plum
- Original network: WOWOW
- Original run: April 4, 2000 – September 19, 2000
- Episodes: 24

Platinumhugen Ordian (銀装騎攻オーディアン, Ginsō Kikō Ōdian; lit. Silver Armor Knight Audian) is a Japanese anime series. Directed by Masami Ōbari, the 24 episodes were broadcast on WOWOW between April 4 and September 19, 2000.

Ordian was Masami Obari's second attempt at directing an anime television series, following 1997's Virus Buster Serge.

== Anime ==
The series uses three pieces of theme music; one opening theme and two ending themes. "Shinryaku: the Chariots VII" by OZWORLD is the series' opening theme. "Eien no Remake" by Yuumi Kobayashi is the series' first ending theme and "TSUIOKU: Only Eternity" by Miki Takaesu is the series' second ending theme.

== Plot ==
Yū Kananase is just an ordinary high-school student. Since he has mysterious inside knowledge about piloting a mecha, he is recruited by the International Military Organization as a potential test pilot for a new mobile armor. However, apparently other young recruits around his age, including one of his classmates, were recruited as test pilot as well. Now Yū must prove that he is the best to be the test pilot.
