= Masami Ōbari =

Japanese anime director and designer

- 大張 正己
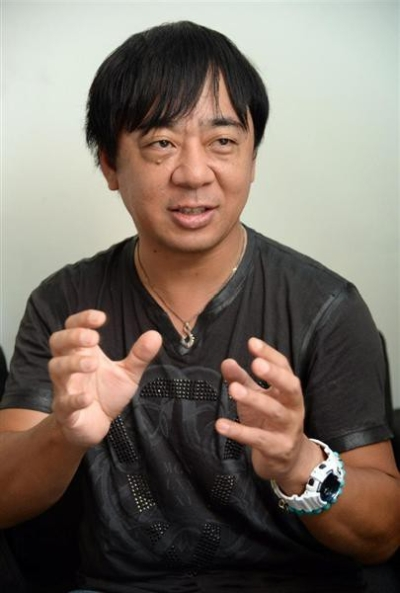
- Obari in an interview with Sankei Shimbun
- Born: January 24, 1966 (age 60); Hiroshima Prefecture, Japan
- Occupations: Director, mecha designer, and character designer

Masami Ōbari (Japanese: 大張 正己, Hepburn: Ōbari Masami; born January 24, 1966) is a Japanese anime director, animation director and mecha and character designer.

== Biography ==
After graduating from high school in 1985, Masami Obari began his career when he joined the animation studio Ashi Production, where he worked on shows such as Special Armored Battalion Dorvack, Transformers (outsourced by Toei Animation to them sometimes), and Star Musketeer Bismarck. Soon after, at the age of 19, he got his first major break when he landed the role of mecha designer on Dancouga – Super Beast Machine God. Not too long after, at the young age of 21, he was given his first directorial role by directing episodes 5 and 6 of the Bubblegum Crisis OVA series. He also made three Fatal Fury films from December 23, 1992, to July 16, 1994.

In 1993, he founded Studio G-1 with fellow animators Kazuto Nakazawa, Masahiro Yamane, Takehiro Nakayama, and Atsuko Ishida, to whom Masami Obari was married, but from whom he is currently divorced. Studio G-1 was later disbanded and was reformed under the name of Studio G-1 Neo in 2000.

Although not originally interested in animation, he was inspired when he formed a high school friendship with classmate Satoshi Urushihara.

In 2016, Obari married the professional model maker Ritsu Togasaki.

He has a younger brother named Takami, who served as the president and CEO of New Japan Pro-Wrestling between October 2020 and December 2023.

== Filmography ==
=== Director ===
==== Original video animation ====
- 1988 Moonlight Rambler (Part 5 of Bubblegum Crisis)
- 1989 Red Eyes (Part 6 of Bubblegum Crisis)
- 1991–1992 Detonator Orgun
- 1996 Battle Arena Toshinden
- 1996 Voltage Fighter Gowcaizer
- 1997–1998 Voogie's Angel (co-directed with Aoi Takenouchi)
- 1999 Dangaizer 3
- 2001–2003 Angel Blade
- 2001–2003 Marine a Go Go
- 2002 Viper GTS
- 2004–2005 Angel Blade Punish!
- 2017 Gundam Build Fighters: Battlogue
- 2020 Gundam Build Divers Battlogue

==== Original net animation ====
- 2023 Amaim Warrior at the Borderline: UltraSteel Ogre-Gear
- 2023 Gundam Build Metaverse

==== Television series ====
- 1997 Virus Buster Serge
- 2000 Platinumhugen Ordian
- 2002 Gravion
- 2004 Gravion Zwei
- 2007 Dancouga Nova – Super God Beast Armor
- 2007 Prism Ark
- 2010–2011 Super Robot Wars Original Generation: The Inspector
- 2013 Bakujyuu Kasshin Ziguru Hazeru
- 2024 Brave Bang Bravern!

==== Animated feature film ====
- 1994 Fatal Fury: The Motion Picture

=== Designer ===
==== Character design ====
===== Direct-to-video animation =====
- 1988–1990 Guy: Double Target (Monster Design)
- 1990–1992 Guardian of Darkness (Monster Design)
- 1993–1994 Time Bokan: Royal Revival (Key animation; episode 2)
- 1996–1997 Voltage Fighter Gowcaizer
- 1997–1998 Voogie's Angel
- 2001–2003 Angel Blade (Monster Design)
- 2004–2005 Angel Blade Punish!

===== Television series =====
- 1997 Virus Buster Serge
- 1998 Weiß Kreuz (Animation director for the 1st opening sequence)
- 2000 Platinumhugen Ordian (Concept, Series director, director Episode 24)

===== Animated feature film =====
- 1992 Fatal Fury: Legend of the Hungry Wolf
- 1993 Fatal Fury 2: The New Battle
- 1994 Fatal Fury: The Motion Picture

===== Video games =====
- 1995 Voltage Fighter Gowcaizer (also voices Brider in the game)
- 2022 The King of Fighters XV
- 2025 Fatal Fury: City of the Wolves

==== Mecha design ====
===== Direct-to-video animation =====
- 1985–1987 Fight! Iczer One
- 1987–1991 Bubblegum Crisis (DD design)
- 1987–1989 Dangaioh
- 1999 Dangaizer 3
- 2001–2003 Marine a Go Go

===== Television series =====
- 1985 Dancouga – Super Beast Machine God
- 1991–1992 The Brave Fighter of Sun Fighbird (chief animator, mecha designer for 9 episodes, opening sequence solo animator)
- 1992–1993 Tekkaman Blade (opening sequence animator)
- 1994–1995 Magic Knight Rayearth (opening sequence animator)
- 1994–1995 Brave Police J-Decker (Guest Mecha Design for episodes 1–3)
- 2000 Platinumhugen Ordian
- 2002 Gravion
- 2004 Gravion Zwei
- 2007 Jūsō Kikō Dancouga Nova
- 2010–2011 Super Robot Wars Original Generation: The Inspector
- 2015–2017 Mobile Suit Gundam: Iron-Blooded Orphans (Animation direction, key animation, in-between animation)
- 2019 Pop Team Epic TV Special (1st half prologue skit and opening sequence)
- 2022 Pop Team Epic Series 2 (Episode 2 story part and ending sequence)

===== Video games =====
- 1989 Moto Roader
- 2007 Super Robot Wars: Original Generations
- 2007 Super Robot Wars OG Gaiden
- 2008 Super Robot Wars Z
- 2012 2nd Super Robot Wars Z
- 2015 3rd Super Robot Wars Z
- 2018 Mobile Corps Iron Saga
- 2019 Super Robot Wars DD

== Bibliography ==
- G-One Masami Obari's Super Design Works First Mission (G-ONE 大張正己作品集). Movic, 1998. ISBN 978-4896013610
- Masami Obari Artworks Robot Soul (大張正己 画集 ロボ魂-ROBOT SOUL-). SB Creative, 2013. ISBN 978-4797370034
- Masami Obari Art Book OBARISM (大張正己画集 OBARISM). Hobby Japan, 2022. ISBN 978-4798627809
