= Amy Tipton =

American film and television actress (born 1980)

- Born: Fayetteville, Georgia, U.S.
- Occupations: Actress, art coordinator
- Years active: 1992–present

Amy Tipton is an American film and television actress. She is also a voice actress and an art coordinator.

== Early life and education ==
She was born in Fayetteville, Georgia.

== Career ==
=== Acting ===
Since 1992, Tipton has worked as an actress in at least six films and eight television productions including guest appearances in the television series One Tree Hill, Little Britain USA, and Unscripted.

She has voiced a number of anime characters, and is the English-language voice of Pai Chan in the anime series Virtua Fighter.

Tipton also voiced the role of Aoi Futaba in the television series You're Under Arrest!

== Filmography ==
=== Voice-acting roles ===
- Babel II — Beyond Infinity as Aira (television)
- Clamp School Detectives as Miyuki, Hikori
- Red Dead Redemption 2 as The Local Pedestrian Population (videogame)
- Soccer Dog: European Cup as Group Walla
- The 27 Club as TV Reporter
- Virtua Fighter as Pai Chan (television)
- Voogie's Angel as Voogie
- You're Under Arrest! as Aoi Futaba

=== Other acting filmography and television work ===
- Navy NCIS: Naval Criminal Investigative Service (2005) as Liza Taylor (television series)
- New Disguise (2005) (film)
- Unscripted (2005) as Acting Student (television series)
- Four the Roses (2006) (film)
- One Tree Hill (2007) as Flight Attendant (television series)
- Reinventing the Wheelers (2007) Leanne (television film)
- Little Britain USA (2008) as Mommy #1 (television series)
- One Tree Hill (2008) as Waitress (television series)
- The Conjuring (2013) as Camilla
- Homeland (2013) as Lisa (television series)
- Hidden Figures (2016) as Crying Woman

=== Art coordinator work ===
- Playing With Toy Guns (2010)
- A Good Old Fashioned Orgy (2011)
- One Tree Hill (2006–2012) – 53 episodes
- Revolution (2012) – 6 episodes
- Banshee (2013) – 5 episodes
- Christmas in Conway (2013)
- Tammy (2014)
- The Squeeze (2015)
- The Walking Dead (2016–2019) – 34 episodes
