= Voogie's Angel =

Original video animation

電脳戦隊ヴギィ'ズ・エンジェル (Dennou Sentai Voogie's Angel)
- Genre: Adventure, comedy, mecha
- Audio drama
- Music by: Hajime Hyakkoku
- Original run: 1996 – present
- Episodes: 24
- Original video animation
- Directed by: Masami Oobari (eps 1 and 2); Aoi Takeuchi (ep 3)
- Written by: Aoi Takeuchi
- Music by: Hajime Hyakkoku; Toru Yukawa
- Studio: J.C.Staff (eps 1 and 2); Frontline (ep 3)
- Released: October 24, 1997 – July 24, 1998
- Runtime: 30 minutes
- Episodes: 3

Voogie's Angel (電脳戦隊ヴギィ'ズ・エンジェル, Dennou Sentai Voogie's Angel) is a three-episode Japanese original video animation series, based on a 1996 radio drama series of the same name created by Aoi Takeuchi. Character designs in the animation were redone by Masami Oobari, based on the original designs created by Shin'ichi Miyamae for the radio series and its CD releases.

A hundred years after the Earth's surface is invaded by aliens (Space Emigrants, or SE) and humans have been forced to live in underwater cities, the last hope of saving the Earth lies in the hands of five cybernetically enhanced women. These women are trained to carry out attacks against the SE in hopes of reclaiming Earth for mankind.

An OVA directed by Hayato Date titled 電脳戦隊ヴギィ'ズ・エンジェル外伝 進め! スーパー・エンジェルス (Dennou Sentai Voogie's Angel Gaiden: Susume! Super Angels!) was released on August 21, 1998. Another OVA, a compilation titled 電脳戦隊ヴギィ'ズ・エンジェル -Forever and ever- (Dennou Sentai Voogie's Angel: Forever and Ever), was released on January 25, 1999.

Dennou Sentai Last Angels, a reboot of Voogie's Angel, had its first CD release on March 24, 2021.

== Cast ==
Voogie's Angel cast
Role		Japanese	English
Role		Japanese	Coastal Studios (2000)
Voogie		Aya Hisakawa	Amy Tipton
Merrybell Candy Stuart		Shiho Kikuchi	Megan Hancock
Rebecca Sweet-Hausen		Kotono Mitsuishi	Traci Dinwiddie
Shiori Tachibana		Kikuko Ino'ue	Juliet Cesario
Midi the Girl		Sakura Tange	Pamela Weidner-Houle
Strikemeyer		Nobuyuki Hiyama	Rick Forrester
Teddy the Boy		Yumi Touma	Natasha Malinsky-Parker
Dr. Crimt		Takehito Koyasu	Geoff Whitesell
Dr. Nina Woodford		Konami Yoshida	Elizabeth Roberts
Lt. Jay Burst		Toshiyuki Morikawa	Chris Hill
Admiral Tsunami		Hidekatsu Shibata	
Scott		Akimitsu Takase	
Chester		Katashi Ishidzuka	
Ash		Akira Ishida	Michael Granberry
Gray		Jun'ichi Endou	Bryan Bolick
1	Cpt. Leon Cougar	Kaneto Shiozawa	Scott Simpson
1	Michelle Summer	Kae Araki	Abbie Marasco
1	Captain	Ken'ichi Morozumi	
1	Crew 1	Ki'ichirou Murase	
1	Crew 2	Eiji Sekiguchi	
1	Magnificent Samurai	Nobuyuki Hiyama	Thomas Bruning
1	Kunizou Gondawara	Shocker OH!NO!	Steve Tylor
1	Okinu	Akiko Nakagawa	Arona Starling
2	Cpt. Ron Howard	Juurouta Kosugi	Dave Underwood
2	Mike	Ki'ichirou Murase	
