= Brave Bang Bravern! =

Japanese anime television series

- Key visual

勇気爆発バーンブレイバーン (Yūki Bakuhatsu Bān Bureibān)
- Genre: Mecha; Science fiction Comedy; Military science fiction
- Created by: Cygames
- Anime television series
- Directed by: Masami Ōbari
- Written by: Keigo Koyanagi
- Music by: Takashi Watanabe
- Studio: CygamesPictures
- Licensed by: Crunchyroll; SEA: Plus Media Networks Asia
- Original network: JNN (TBS)
- English network: SEA: Aniplus Asia
- Original run: January 11, 2024 – March 28, 2024
- Episodes: 12

Brave Bang Bravern! (勇気爆発バーンブレイバーン, Yūki Bakuhatsu Bān Bureibān), also known as Bang Brave Bang Bravern, is an original Japanese mecha anime television series produced by Cygames, animated by CygamesPictures, and directed by Masami Ōbari, with series composition by Keigo Koyanagi, mechanical designs by MORUGA and Mizuki Sakura, and character designs by Kouichi Motomura based on Kamokamen's original designs.

It aired from January to March 2024 on TBS and its affiliates.

== Story ==
Lewis Smith and Isami Ao meet each other in Oahu, Hawaii, during joint American-Japanese military exercises under AD-RIMPAC when a mysterious enemy invades the island. When all hope seems lost, a mysterious talking robot named Bravern appears and asks Isami to pilot him into battle, revealing that the invaders are "Deathdrives", super robots who rely on the power of humans to pilot them.

After the first Deathdrive, Superbia, is destroyed, he ejects a young woman named Lulu, who Lewis cares for until she recovers. Upon awakening, she begins to develop both physically and mentally, learning to speak, eat, and walk.

== Characters ==
The cast of Bang Brave Bang Bravern

=== Main characters ===
Isami Ao (イサミ・アオ)
Voiced by: Ryōta Suzuki
A soldier in the Japanese Ground Self-Defense Forces. He is the only one who can pilot Bravern, as he only allows him to pilot him.
Lewis Smith (ルイス・スミス, Ruisu Sumisu)
Voiced by: Yōhei Azakami
A soldier in the US Marine Corps, who befriends Isami after Bravern arrives. He later dies during the battle against Vanitas, Pessimism, and Knuth, but is reborn as Bravern after his ghost merges with his Titanostrider and Knuth, with Knuth's power sending him back in time to the beginning of the Deathdrive invasion. He is resurrected following the final battle against Verum Vita.
Bravern (ブレイバーン, Bureibān)
Voiced by: Kenichi Suzumura
A talking super robot who arrives to defend Earth from the Deathdrives. He seems to know Isami and will only let him pilot him. It is later revealed that he is Lewis, who was reborn after his ghost merged with his Titanostrider and Knuth, with Knuth's power sending him back in time to the beginning of the Deathdrive invasion.
Lulu (ルル, Ruru)
Voiced by: Saya Aizawa
A mysterious young woman who Lewis finds on the shore of Oahu and is Superbia's pilot.

=== Allied Task Force ===
Hibiki Rio (ヒビキ・リオウ, Hibiki Riō)
Voiced by: Yume Miyamoto
Miyu Katō (ミユ・カトウ)
Voiced by: Ai Kakuma
Honoka Suzunagi (ホノカ・スズナギ)
Voiced by: Kaori Maeda
Karen Aldrin (カレン・オルドレン, Karen Orudoren)
Voiced by: Yukiyo Fujii
Nina Kowalski (ニーナ・コワルスキー, Nīna Kowarusukī)
Voiced by: Nanako Mori
Hal King (ハル・キング, Haru Kingu)
Voiced by: Kenta Miyake
Thomas J. Prahmman (トーマス・J・プラムマン, Tōmasu J Puramuman)
Voiced by: Tomoyuki Shimura
Isao Kawada (イサオ・カワダ)
Voiced by: Hiroshi Shirokuma
Akira Mishima (アキラ・ミシマ, Akira Mishima)
Voiced by: Shiori Izawa
Shelley Rolen (シェリー・ローレン, Sherī Rōren)
Voiced by: Saki Yoshida
Richard Haze (リチャード・ヘイズ, Richādo Heizu)
Voiced by: Kazuhiro Nakaya
Kazuki Tōdō (カズキ・トウドウ)
Voiced by: Taichi Takeda
Joshua (ジョシュア, Joshua)
Voiced by: Yuna Kamakura

=== Bundeswehr ===
Heidemarie Barrow (ハイデマリー・バロウ, Haidemarī Barō)
Voiced by: Yū Asakawa

=== CIA ===
Bob Craib (ボブ・クレイブ, Bobu Kureibu)
Voiced by: Chō

=== Deathdrives ===
Superbia (スペルビア, Superubia)
Voiced by: Tomokazu Sugita
Cupiridas (クピリダス, Kupiridasu)
Voiced by: Tetsu Inada
Knuth (クーヌス, Kūnusu)
Voiced by: Atsuko Tanaka
Vanitas (ヴァニタス, Vanitasu)
Voiced by: Hikaru Midorikawa
Pessimism (ペシミズム, Peshimizumu)
Voiced by: Chafurin
Segnitis (セグニティス, Segunitisu)
Voiced by: Katsuyuki Konishi
Ira (イーラ, Īra)
Voiced by: Kenjiro Tsuda
Popalchipum (ポーパルチープム, Pōparuchīpumu)
Voiced by: Fumihiko Tachiki
Verum Vita (ヴェルム・ヴィータ, Vuerumu Vuīta)
Voiced by: Rie Kugimiya

== Media ==
=== Anime ===
The opening theme song is "Babān to Suizan! Bānbureibān" (ババーンと推参！バーンブレイバーン; "Ba-Bang to Suisan! Bang Bravern"), performed by Kenichi Suzumura, while the ending theme song is "Sōen no Shōzō" (双炎の肖像; "Portrait of Twin Flames"), performed by Ryōta Suzuki and Yōhei Azakami.

An advance screening of the first two episodes was held at Toho Cinemas in Roppongi Hills on December 10, 2023.

Crunchyroll streamed the series under the title Brave Bang Bravern!, which is also available in India. Aniplus Asia streamed the series in Southeast Asia.

==== Episodes ====
No.	Title (Note: All English titles are taken from Crunchyroll.)	Directed by	Written by	Storyboarded by	Original release date
1	"Wait's Over, Isami!"; Transliteration: "Mata Seta na, Isami!" (Japanese: 待たせたな、イサミ！)	Katsuya Shigehara	Keigo Koyanagi	Masami Ōbari & Katsuya Shigehara	January 11, 2024
During a joint American-Japanese military exercise, Isami Ao meets Lewis Smith. Suddenly, alien robots attack Earth; during the battle, a giant talking robot appears from the sky and asks Isami to pilot him. With Isami as his pilot, the robot, calling himself "Bravern", fights off the invaders.
2	"Isami! You'll Be Here Soon, Won't You, Isami!?"; Transliteration: "isamīーーītu! Sorosoro Dayo na, Isamīーーītu!!" (Japanese: イサミィーーッ！そろそろだよな、イサミィーーッ！！)	Takehiro Miura	Keigo Koyanagi	Takehiro Miura & Katsuya Shigehara	January 18, 2024
Bravern tells the joint military leaders about the threat of the "Deathdrives". While Isami is being interrogated and tortured, another giant robot, Superbia, attacks. Lewis offers to pilot Bravern in Isami's stead, but Bravern insists that only Isami can pilot him. Although Isami and Bravern defeat Superbia, Isami is reduced to curling up into a fetal position in Bravern's cockpit.
3	"Lulu... That's Her Name"; Transliteration: "Ruru…… Sore ga, Kanojo no Namaeda" (Japanese: ルル……それが、彼女の名前だ)	Taro Shimoigusa, Hidetoshi Watanabe	Keigo Koyanagi	Masami Ōbari, Yoshinari Saito	January 25, 2024
Lewis finds a young woman on the beach where Bravern fought Superbia. An aquatic Deathdrive attacks the naval fleet from underwater. Bravern and Isami defeat it, but then find Lewis and the woman, who calls herself "Lulu".
4	"Isami, It Seems You Still Have Much to Learn About People"; Transliteration: "Isami, Kimi wa Mada, Hito Toiu Mono o Wakatteinai Yōda" (Japanese: イサミ、キミはまだ、人というものを分かっていないようだ)	Yoshinari Saito	Keigo Koyanagi	Yoshinari Saito	February 1, 2024
Isami gets a new pilot suit while Lewis tries to help Lulu adjust to life at the base. Tokyo is destroyed by a Deathdrive.
5	"That's One Thing That's Beyond My Powers"; Transliteration: "Sore wa Kitto, Watashi ni wa Dekinai Kotodarō" (Japanese: それはきっと、私には出来ないことだろう)	Takashi Narukawa & Kenta Hayashi	Keigo Koyanagi	Takashi Narukawa & Takehiro Miura	February 8, 2024
The military forces head to Japan as Bravern encourages Lewis to help Isami cope. Isami and Lewis face off in a boxing match.
6	"Everything Will Be Okay. For I... I Am Bravern!"; Transliteration: "Zettai ni Daijōbuda. Nazenara…… Watashi ga Bureibān Dakarada!" (Japanese: 絶対に大丈夫だ。なぜなら……私がブレイバーンだからだ！)	Takashi Narukawa & Kenta Hayashi	Keigo Koyanagi	Takashi Narukawa & Takehiro Miura	February 15, 2024
The military arrives in Japan in search of survivors, planning to initiate a bombing run if none are found. At first, they find only Deathdrives, but at the last moment they make contact with surviving soldiers. When they are unable to call off the bombing run in time, Bravern takes control of the missiles and guides them to only hit the Deathdrives. Superbia returns and demands that they return Lulu to him.
7	"Well, Isami? What Would You Do in a Situation Like This?"; Transliteration: "Dōsuru Isami! Konna Toki, Isami Nara Dōsuru nda!" (Japanese: どうするイサミ！こんな時、イサミならどうするんだ！)	Yorihiro Tanimoto	Keigo Koyanagi	Toshihiko Masuda	February 22, 2024
Another Deathdrive, Cupiridas, arrives near an alien tower. Bravern and Isami go to face him, leaving the others to deal with Superbia. The tower keeps replicating Cupiridas every time Bravern and Isami defeat him, so they destroy the tower to defeat him. Superbia is shocked to find that Lulu is now sentient and talking. They find another Lulu, dead, inside Cupiridas' capsule. Superbia reveals that the Lulus are organic batteries the Deathdrives use to empower themselves. Lewis tries to pilot Superbia himself, but it does not work. Lewis is given a new Titanostrider that Lulu can co-pilot with him.
8	"Until We Meet Again, Smith"; Transliteration: "Mata Aō, Sumisu" (Japanese: また会おう、スミス)	Katsuya Shigehara	Keigo Koyanagi	Masami Ōbari & Katsuya Shigehara	February 29, 2024
Lewis forms his new unit, the Brave Knights. When three new Deathdrives, Vanitas, Pessimism, and Knuth, attack, Bravern and Isami fight Vanitas and Pessimism while the Brave Knights face Knuth. During the battle, Lewis sacrifices himself to destroy Knuth.
9	"Isami! We Must Save the World Together!"; Transliteration: "Isamī! Oretachi de, Sekai o Sukū nda!!" (Japanese: イサミィ！俺たちで、世界を救うんだ！！)	Yoshinari Saito	Yūsuke Kambayashi	Masami Ōbari & Yoshinari Saito	March 7, 2024
As the team mourns Lewis's death, Bravern and Isami continue their battle against Vanitas and Pessimism. Lewis and Knuth meet as ghosts. Refusing to accept his fate, Lewis's ghost merges with his Titanostrider and Knuth. Knuth's power sends him back in time to the beginning of the Deathdrive invasion, where he is reborn as Bravern. In the present, Bravern fuses with a new armor suit, becoming Burn Bravern. With new power, Burn Bravern and Isami destroy Vanitas and Pessimism, with Isami finding new resolve to fight on in Lewis's honor.
10	"In Japan, They Call This OMIAI"; Transliteration: "Nippon de wa Sore o OMIAI Toiu" (Japanese: 日本ではそれをOMIAIという)	Hidetoshi Watanabe	Keigo Koyanagi	Katsuya Shigehara	March 14, 2024
11	"Commence Operation Bonfire!"; Transliteration: "Operēshon・Bōnfaia, Kaishida!" (Japanese: オペレーション・ボーンファイア、開始だ！)	Kana Sakashita	Masaki Kuribayashi	Tetsuya Akutsu	March 21, 2024
12	"Beyond Brave Bang!"; Transliteration: "Yūki Bakuhatsu no, Sonosakihe!!" (Japanese: 勇気爆発の、その先へ！！)	Masami Ōbari, Katsuya Shigehara & Takehiro Miura	Keigo Koyanagi	Masami Ōbari, Katsuya Shigehara, Toshihiko Masuda & Takehiro Miura	March 28, 2024

=== Web radio ===
A web radio program hosted by Ryōta Suzuki and Yōhei Azakami began streaming via Cygames Anime's YouTube channel on January 17, 2024, under the title Original TV Anime “Yūki Bakuhatsu Bān Bureibān” Web Radio (オリジナルTVアニメ「勇気爆発バーンブレイバーン」Webレイディオ).

=== Video games ===
Bravern appears in Super Robot Wars DD and Medarot S.

== See also ==
- Brave series
- Gravion
- Lego Exo-Force
- Megas XLR
