= Ruin Explorers =

Manga and anime series

- DVD cover art

秘境探検ファム&イーリー (Hikyō Tanken Famu and Īrī)
- Genre: Adventure, comedy, sword and sorcery
- Manga
- Written by: Kunihiko Tanaka
- Published by: Hobby Japan
- Magazine: RPG Magazine
- Published: December 1991
- Volumes: 2
- Original video animation
- Directed by: Takeshi Mori
- Written by: Takeshi Mori
- Music by: Masamichi Amano
- Studio: ANIMATE (production); Ajia-do Animation Works (animation)
- Licensed by: NA: AnimEigo
- Released: June 25, 1995 – February 25, 1996
- Runtime: 30 minutes per episode
- Episodes: 4
- icon

Ruin Explorers (秘境探検ファム&イーリー, Hikyō Tanken Famu and Īrī), also known as Ruin Explorers Fam & Ihrie, is a four episode 1995 OVA by ANIMATE and Asia-Do. It is set in a fantasy environment and stars Fam and Ihrie, two female treasure hunters working to find the "Ultimate Power".

== Plot ==
The story is set in a fantasy world built atop the remnants of a long-fallen magical civilization, whose advanced powers were lost after a devastating war. In the present day, most people regard that era as legend, but adventurers known as Ruin Explorers continue to scour ancient ruins in search of surviving relics. Among them are Fam and Ihrie, two debt-ridden treasure hunters willing to take on dangerous jobs for the promise of profit. Their latest quest draws them into the hunt for the so-called "Ultimate Power", a legendary artifact said to grant any wish to its possessor.

As Fam and Ihrie pursue this object, they become entangled with other explorers and factions, each driven by their own motives, including revenge, ambition, and the desire to save entire nations. Their journey takes them across perilous seas and cursed ruins, where ancient magic, monsters, and political conspiracies threaten not only their lives, but the stability of the world itself.

== Characters ==
Ihrie (イーリー, Īrī)
Voiced by: Michiko Neya (Japanese); Tamara Lo (English)
A sorceress and swordfighter who acts a bit like a tomboy. She was once cursed as a child, when she was the apprentice to a cruel magician, which causes her to transform into a mouse any time she uses magic. As such, her prime motives for acquiring the Ultimate Power are 1) to lift her curse, 2) to get revenge on her old master, and 3) to conquer the world.
Fam (ファム, Famu)
Voiced by: Hekiru Shiina (Japanese); Jessica Calvello (English)
An immature, air-headed and optimistic girl with pointy elf-like ears, fangs, and a cat-like tail, making her resemble a catgirl. She is a Wiccan sorceress who calls on the spirits of nature to perform magic. Fam is unwilling to use her magic for destructive means because the spirits disapprove of such uses and as such might not "talk" to her any longer. This would result in her losing her magic abilities.
Lyle (ラエル, Raeru)
Voiced by: Hikaru Midorikawa (Japanese); Jason Douglas (English)
The prince of a lost kingdom, set out for revenge against Ruguduroll.
Rasha (ラーシャ, Rāsha)
Voiced by: Rica Matsumoto (Japanese); Kelly Manison (English)
Another female treasure hunter, coupled with Miguel and rivaling Fam and Ihrie. She is a sorceress, but does not share the weaknesses of a curse nor fear of animosity with the spirits. However, she does have a strong fear of mice, which can be especially crippling after Ihrie has been transformed by her curse.
Miguel (ミゲル, Migeru)
Voiced by: Kōichi Yamadera (Japanese); Brett Weaver (English)
A powerful swordsman and treasure hunter, accompanying Rasha. He is vain and boastful, claiming that nobody has ever cut him, and that he has defeated fifty cavalry men at once.
Galuff (ガルフ, Garufu)
Voiced by: Chikao Ōtsuka (Japanese); Guil Lunde (English)
A selfish merchant who constantly deceives the other characters in order to obtain treasure or money, always followed by his dog, Gil. He is also a coward, and only comes with the rest of the group because he either sees something in it for him, or does not want to be left alone in dangerous areas. However, he is highly knowledgeable and thus rather valued by the explorers as a source of information.
Ruguduroll (ルグドゥル, Ruguduru)
Voiced by: Iemasa Kayumi (Japanese); Tristan MacAvery (English)
The main antagonist, a powerful magician that ruined Lyle's kingdom and is out to obtain the Ultimate Power.

== Episodes ==
The opening theme is "Magical Beat!" by Rica Matsumoto. For Episodes 1–3, the ending theme is "Dear Myself – A Time Capsule to Myself" (Dear Myself〜私だけのタイムカプセル, Dear Myself〜Watashi dake no taimu kapuseru) by Kumi Konno. For Episode 4, the ending theme is "Magical Beat!" by Rica Matsumoto.

No.	Title	Original release date
1	"As I Command Thee" "Waga i no mama ni..." (我が意のままに...)	June 25, 1995
The story follows Fam and Ihrie, who are searching for the legendary Ultimate Power, which is said to grant any wishes the finder may have. After obtaining a map from the merchant Galuff, they find the "Proof of Royalty" in an ancient castle, where they fight off fellow treasure hunters Miguel and Rasha, along with the treacherous Galuff. Fam and Ihrie learn that alongside the Proof of Royalty, they need the Sword of Sargus and Mirror of Truth to obtain the Ultimate Power.
2	"Oh, Spirits that Reside in the Air" "Taiki ni amaneku seirei yo" (大気にあまねく精霊よ)	August 25, 1995
Later, Ihrie scolds Fam for being so slow at memorizing new spells, which causes Fam to run away on her own. She encounters Lyle in the woods, and falls deeply in love with him. Lyle is also looking for the Ultimate Power, and the two partner up to find the rest of the treasures. Eventually Fam, Lyle, Ihrie, Miguel, Rasha and Galuff all end up at a ruined city; the location of the Sword of Sargus. However, there they run into Ruguduroll, who taunts Lyle and proves invulnerable to both swords and magic before vanishing, leaving the sword behind. Lyle reveals that Ruguduroll was once a priest in his homeland, but was corrupted by magic and destroyed the entire kingdom, along with Lyle's fiancee, Meria. This is why Lyle wants the Ultimate Power; for revenge.
3	"Let the Light of Admonishment Shine Upon the Fools" "Orokamono ni imashime no hikari o" (愚か者に戒めの光を)	November 25, 1995
As Ihrie tries to grab the Sword of Sargus, it is revealed that the spirit inside it, Sargus, only lets people who are without materialistic wishes touch it. As such, Fam is the only person in the group allowed to touch the sword, and her wish is to help Lyle on his quest. As Fam is determined to help the prince, Ihrie decides to come with them, and since Rasha has fallen in love with Lyle as well (causing rivalry between her and Fam), she follows them as well and forces Miguel along. With Galuff in tow, the group goes to find the Mirror of Truth. This quest does not go on for long, however, as Ruguduroll finds it first, then attacks the group and steals the Proof of Royalty and Sword of Sargus. At the same time, it is revealed that Ihrie's magic is the same type as Ruguduroll's, and therefore she can harm him.
4	"The Skies, the Sea and the Woods" "Sora ya umi ya mori ya?" (空や海や森や...)	February 25, 1996
Ruguduroll is unable to get the Ultimate Power, as the sword belongs to Lyle as per Fam's wishes, and Sargus refuses Ruguduroll's wishes. The group make their way to Ruguduroll's castle, and on their way they find a magical stone where his memories are inscribed. Tapping into it, they see that Ruguduroll was corrupted by all the poverty and misery in the land that went unseen by the royal family. He wanted the power to stop it, and accessed the powerful magic hidden by the king. The group break into his castle, and Fam and Ihrie manage to hold him back with their magic as Lyle attacks him with the reclaimed Sword of Sargus. Ruguduroll is killed, and Lyle begins rebuilding his kingdom as Fam says goodbye and runs to Ihrie.
