= Angel Blade =

Original video animation and video game

- North American DVD cover

エンジェルブレイド (Enjieru Bureido)
- Original video animation
- Directed by: Masami Ōbari
- Produced by: Masami Ōbari
- Written by: Remu Aoki; Hitoshi Koga
- Music by: Keiichi Shiraishi
- Studio: Studio G-1 Neo; Frontline
- Licensed by: US: Central Park Media (expired), Critical Mass (current)
- Released: December 14, 2001 – April 11, 2003
- Episodes: 3
- Original video animation

Angel Blade Punish!
- Directed by: Masami Ōbari
- Produced by: Studio G-1 Neo
- Written by: Tomohito Kanou
- Music by: Elements Garden
- Studio: Studio G-1 Neo; Asahi Production
- Licensed by: US: Kitty Media (expired), Critical Mass (current)
- Released: December 29, 2004 – September 9, 2005
- Episodes: 3

Angel Blade (エンジェルブレイド, Enjeru Bureido) is part of the Vanilla Series of explicit mature OVA. It was created and directed by Masami Ōbari, who was also responsible for the design of the characters and would also be responsible for the development of the short anime adaptation of The King of Fighters XV. The anime is a parody of Go Nagai's manga and anime Cutie Honey and Kekko Kamen.

The storyline is continued in a three-episode sequel series, Angel Blade Punish!.

The first series was released in the U.S. on two DVDs, entitled Angel Blade (containing episodes 1–2) and Angel Blade Returns (containing episode 3 and some bonus material). Angel Blade Punish! was released in the U.S. as a single DVD containing all three episodes.

The doujin video game company Digi Anime released an eroge visual novel of Angel Blade in 2002 based on the first series.

== Synopsis ==
Angel Blade takes place in a future where the Earth's surface is no longer habitable due to pollution. Humans live in 99 cities above the smog, while the surface below, unknown to them, is home to a race of mutants. Suddenly, a castle, ruled by the organization Dark Mother, mysteriously appears in the sky over City Number 69. For unknown purposes, the mysterious people of this dark castle track down women and start their devious machinations, which are unknown but involve raping women. In the time of chaos, Angel Blade, a beautiful woman, appears as a force of justice to protect the women.

== Characters ==
=== Heroes ===
==== Angel Blade ====
Angel Blade (エンジェルブレイド Enjieru Bureido) is the main character of the series. She is the alter ego of Moena Shinguji. Her mission is to save the day whenever someone is attacked by one of Phantom Lady's mutants. She primarily fights with a sword that is formed from her heart-shaped pendant. Sexual encounters are her Achilles' heel, as her hormones sometimes render her helpless. She sometimes rides the "Angel Motor", but not in the Punish! episodes. Her uniform and powers were developed by her parents specifically to battle Phantom Lady and her minions, though it is never explained why they would develop such a sexually charged outfit (one that leaves her breasts, buttocks and genitalia exposed) for their daughter. When her life or anyone else's life is in great danger, Angel Blade goes into a sort of super mode where she dons angelic wings of energy and her eyes glow white. Also in Angel Blade Punish! episode 2 she is forced to enter a weaker form due to her fight with Phantom Lady (coincidentally this weaker form covers more of her body). It is revealed in Angel Blade Punish! Episode 3 that Angel Blade's true power is Gravity, that only comes out when people are in great danger. This is partly due to Elphie's "Revival" of Angel Blade.

==== Angel Ender ====
Angel Ender (エンジェルエンダー Enjieru Endaa) is Angel Blade's equally revealingly dressed partner who normally fights using only her fists. She is the alter ego of Shaiya. She first appears in Angel Blade episode 3, where she saves Angel Blade during her battle with Colonel Elaine and General Chloe; she also claims that she is the prototype for Angel Blade. She has her own version of the Angel Motor. Angel is seen several times in Angel Blade Punish!

==== Angel Beretta ====
Angel Beretta (エンジェルバレット Enjieru Beretta) is the mysterious third Angel, who rides a motorcycle and fights using a pair of hi-tech pistols. She appears only at the end of Angel Blade Punish! episode 2 and for a few minutes in the third episode. She saves Angel Blade from being impaled by Widow, but does not say much. She is the only one of the Angels who is not sexually molested at some point by the villains. It is unknown if she is another prototype, or a new Angel, but it is revealed in the opening credits that she is Elphie's Angel.

==== Moena Shinguji ====
Moena Shinguji (神宮寺萌奈 Shingūji Moena) is a young, not overdeveloped, student at the academy who is able to transform into her super heroine alter ego, Angel Blade, thanks to the power of her heart-shaped amulet given to her by her parents. She works as a waitress at her aunt's cafe on the academy campus. At first, she is unaware of her dual-life as Angel Blade, until (near the end of the first episode) her heart pendant is damaged, leaving Moena's consciousness in control of the Angel Blade body.

==== Shaia Hishizaki ====
Shaia Hishizaki (菱崎シャイア Hishizaki Shaia) is a famous supermodel who first appears briefly in Angel Blade episode 1. She later joins Moena and is revealed to be Angel Ender's alter ego. In the Angel Blade Punish! series, she is raped twice: first (in episode 2) by her photographer, after he is "brainwashed" by Widow, then later (in episode 3) by Widow's minion Sledge, in front of an arena full of famous people who all turn out to be mutants.

She shares a name with a character from the video game/OVA series Voltage Fighter Gowcaizer, which Masami Ōbari previously did work on.

==== Elphie Elfman ====
Elphie Elfman (エルフィ・エルフマン Erufui Erufuman) is a busty cowgirl who meets Moena at the beginning of the second Angel Blade Punish! episode. When Moena eventually gets in trouble, Elphie transforms into Angel Beretta. In Angel Blade Punish! episode 3, she (as Angel Beretta) saves Ayame, Shaiya and Angel Blade after they are captured by Widow. She sometimes uses English words and phrases amongst her otherwise Japanese sentences (e.g. "What's your name, samurai girl?" and "Moena, are you okay?"). In the third episode of Angel Blade Punish!, Moena had already lost her powers from Widow's assault, and Elphie tries to comfort her in the hot tub. Elphie goes down on Moena, and a mysterious nature increases as she causes Moena to have a subliminal golden orgasm, where she has a vision of a mysterious winged woman. Elphie's knowledge of the Angel System and her obtainment of the Beretta form are still unexplained, and rumors are that she could be Nailkaizer in the form she was originally before she was mutated by Dark Mother, since in Nail's flashback in Punish! episode one, her face was not shown and her hair was shorter and light blue. Also, both characters in the Japanese cast are played by Yū Asakawa.

She shares a name with a character from the video game/OVA series Voltage Fighter Gowcaizer, which Masami Ōbari previously did work on.

==== Ayame Fudo ====
Ayame Fudo (不動あやめ Fudo Ayame) is a policewoman from a ninja family who becomes involved with the Angel Units and tries to assist them as best as she can. Despite her skills, however, she is captured and raped almost every time she does. She also has bad luck with clothing (best shown in the second episode of Angel Blade Punish! when she took a dive off a diving board into a pool and somehow lost her swimsuit). She first appears in Angel Blade episode 1, where she is sexually humiliated, sexually tortured and raped by Nailkaizer and her mutant henchmen until Angel Blade saves her.

She wears a ninja costume and a hair style similar to Mai Shiranui from the video game/OVA series Fatal Fury, which Masami Ōbari previously did work on.

=== Villains ===
==== Phantom Lady ====
Phantom Lady (ファントム・レディ Fuantomu Redei, "Mistress Phantom" in the dub) is the main antagonist of the series. Mysterious and powerful, she has gigantic breasts that are constantly swollen, engorged and lactating. She has her breasts pumped while having sex with Lady Nailkaizer in the original series, nurses her minion Karin in one scene in Punish!, and is even shown drinking from them herself. Like her underlings, she can sprout a penis from her vagina at any time. She is suspected of being Moena's mother. In the third episode of Angel Blade, after the credits, Kyouka is shown confined in the Phantom Lady's fortress. When she regained consciousness and saw Phantom Lady, Kyouka calls her Maina, the mother of Moena. In the second episode, Isato remembers a promise to Maina saying that she has a dark spell cast over her for the sake of the system, which seems to strengthen the link.

==== Nailkaizer ====
Nailkaizer (ネイルカイザー Neirukaizaa) is one of Phantom Lady's chief minions. She is the first character to appear in the Angel Blade series. Like Phantom Lady, she has the ability to grow a penis from her vagina, though she possesses a unique ability to grow three of them. In the first episode of Angel Blade Punish!, she is sacrificed by Phantom Lady, but she is saved by Angel Blade (who destroys the "chaos") and Angel Ender (who is shown holding Nailkaizer and Kyouka). In the first episode of Angel Blade Punish! Nail has a flashback when Phantom Lady saves her from unseen dark forces, and transforms her into the mutant Nailkaizer. Nailkaizer's whereabouts are unknown at the moment, but there is some speculation that she may have something to do with Elphie, since she slightly takes on the same appearance in her Angel Beretta form, with her hair in high pigtails and white lipstick, including her dark skin and green eyes as well as her clothes. Elphie also recognized Widow's presence, and Moena saw a vision of Nail after Elphie caused her to orgasm. Nailkaizer's name and character design are taken from the character Necrocaizer (who is also known as Elphie Elphman) in Voltage Fighter Gowcaizer, which Masami Ōbari previously worked on.

==== Karin Son ====
Karin Son (孫カリン Son Karin) is one of the five chief minions. She appears to be Phantom Lady's biological daughter, as she is always calling her okaa-san, Japanese for mother. Karin tends to keep to herself until episode 3. Towards the end of episode 2, she captures Kyouka, and wounds Isato. She plays a major role in episode 3, and in the first episode of Angel Blade Punish!, in which she rapes Kyouka.

She is more or less based on the character of the same name from the video game/OVA series Voltage Fighter Gowcaizer, which Masami Ōbari previously did work on.

==== Widow ====
Widow (ウイドウ Uidou) is one of Phantom Lady's mutants. She appears for the first time in Angel Blade Punish! episode 2. Her name is a reference to her spider-like abilities. Widow almost succeeds in impaling Angel Blade, but Angel Beretta comes to her rescue. She tends to call Angel Blade a "caterpillar".

==== Chloe and Elaine ====
Colonel Elaine (イレーヌ大佐 Ireenu-taisa) and General Chloe (クローエ将軍 Kurooe-shougun) are minions/female mutants of the Phantom Lady. They are featured in episode 2, where Chloe captures then rapes Emily, and Elaine fingers Seiryu. When General Chloe is in the hospital and goes to Ayame's room, there is a dummy in her bed in place of her. This dummy is Sally from The Nightmare Before Christmas, except with modified hair. They also have a small role in Angel Blade Punish! episode 1 where they get "punished" by Lady Phantom. They appear to work together and both attack by expelling powerful energy from their temporary, what looks like, a penis, which is why they are mutants. Chloe almost kills Angel Blade before Angel Ender comes to her rescue, catching Chloe and Elaine off guard. Phantom Lady punishes them for their failure in a degrading, erotic torture, but ceases when she notices they are getting pleasure from it. She then uses them in the "feast" and it appears as though they are now nothing more than a part of the "chaos".

==== Rush and Sledge ====
Rush (ラッシュ Rasshu) and Sledge (スレッジ Surejji) are the minions of Widow. They appear in the second and third Angel Blade Punish! episodes. In the third episode they rape both Shaiya and Ayame in a big arena full of famous people, who turn out to be mutants. Later in the episode, they use themselves as shields to protect Widow from Angel Beretta's gunfire and while they are weakened, Shaiya and Ayame kill them.

=== Minor characters ===
==== Emily Chinen ====
Emily Chinen (知念エミリィ Chinen Emirii) is a big-breasted, pink-haired policewoman who is the daughter of the police chief of City Number 69. She first appears in episode 1 and is Ayame Fudou's partner. In episode 2, she tries to capture Shogun Chloe but is raped in the process. She eventually disappears from the series.

Her name may be a reference to the similarly styled policewoman character named Erika Chinen from the video game/OVA series Virus Buster Serge, which Masami Ōbari previously did work on.

==== Kyouka ====
Aunt Kyouka (響香 Kyouka) is Moena's aunt and the owner of the café where she works. She possesses pouty lips and tight curvature, but is best known for her enormous breasts that rival even Phantom Lady's. In the second Angel Blade episode, she meets with Isato, Moena's supposedly dead father, in his secret lab. She is the 'mother' of the Angel System, and her womb was somehow used to create the Angel Units Blade, Ender, and Beretta. She is captured by Karin, Phantom Lady's mutant. In Angel Blade Punish! episode 1, Karin rapes Kyouka while they wait for Angel Blade.

==== Seiryuu Tenmyouin ====
Seiryuu Tenmyouin (天明院聖流 Tenmyouin Seiryuu) is the student body president and most popular girl at AquaTokyo complex's university. In episode 1, Nailkaizer mistakenly believes she is Angel Blade and captures her. Ayame tries to save her but is also captured. In episode 2, she learns about Moena being Angel Blade, and tells her she would keep her secret. Later she goes to the city hospital to find Ayame, is captured by General Elaine and used as a hostage against Ayame's partner Emily who ends up being raped by Chloe while Seiryuu is forced to watch while Elaine violates her, only to be saved by Angel Blade. In episode 3, she is raped and then used as bait for Angel Blade. She appears in all three Angel Blade episodes, but does not appear in Angel Blade Punish!.

Her name is a reference to the Azure Dragon.

==== Hasumi ====
Hasumi is Moena's friend and classmate who often complains about her breast size. She is also a bit boy-crazed and drags Moena to go out shopping to find some boys in episode 1 at Aunt Kyouka behest. She acts mainly as a comic relief character and is one of the few females close to Moena not to be raped or sexually molested, though she herself does playfully grope Moena's breasts in episode 1. Like most of her classmates, she idolizes Angel Blade. She encounters Moena's injured father after he and Kyouka are attacked by Karin in his lab, but is unaware of his connection to Moena and Kyouka. She does not appear in Angel Blade Punish! except in a post-credits scene.

==== Hazuki Tachibana ====
Hazuki Tachibana (立花ハヅキ Tachibana Hazuki) is a beautiful, well-endowed girl who appears in Angel Blade Punish! episode 2 and 3 as a television reporter. She is tricked continuously into exposing or humiliating herself on television, but remains tough despite what happens to her. She is one of the only female characters in the show who is just molested (by her cameraman, who she fights off by kicking him) rather than engaged in sex of any kind.

She bears an uncanny resemblance to Mizuki Tachibana from the mecha anime television series Gravion and its sequel Gravion Zwei, which Masami Ōbari previously did work on.

==== Daisuke Yayoi ====
Daisuke Yayoi (やよい・だいすけ Yayoi Daisuke) is Shaiya's cameraman. A very eccentric artist and a nice guy through half of Punish!, he and his crew are 'attacked' by Widow while in the restroom, as she forces them to have sex with her, where they were mutated by her webs. This causes Yayoi to assault Shaiya and leave her vulnerable for Sledge and Rush to kidnap.
