= Voltage Fighter Gowcaizer =

1995 video game

- Developer: Technōs Japan
- Publisher: SNK: Technōs Japan (Neo Geo CD) Urban Plant (PlayStation)
- Director: Kengo Asai
- Producer: Teruo Ichimura
- Designer: Masami Ōbari
- Programmers: Hiroshi Sato; Masahiro Izumi; Masanori Mori
- Artists: Akiko Maruyama; Atushi Ikeda; Chihiro Kushibe
- Writer: Kengo Asai
- Composers: Chiaki Iizuka; Kennosuke Suemura; Kiyomi Kataoka; Reiko Uehara
- Platforms: Arcade, Neo Geo AES, Neo Geo CD, PlayStation, PlayStation 3
- Release: 18 September 1995: Arcade; JP: 18 September 1995 Neo Geo AES; NA/JP: 20 October 1995 Neo Geo CD; JP: 24 November 1995 PlayStation; JP: 17 July 1997 PlayStation 3; JP: September 2011
- Genre: Fighting
- Modes: Single-player, multiplayer
- Arcade system: Neo Geo MVS

Voltage Fighter Gowcaizer (Note: Also known as Superhuman Academy Gowcaizer (Japanese: 超人学園ゴウカイザー, Hepburn: Chōjin Gakuen Gōkaizā) in Japan.) is a 1995 superhero-themed fighting game developed by Technōs Japan and published by SNK for the Neo Geo MVS arcade system, AES home console and Neo Geo CD. It was the company's second attempt at a fighting game, following the Neo Geo fighting game version of Double Dragon. It features character designs by artist Masami Ōbari, who previously worked on the anime adaptations of the Fatal Fury series and would later work on the short anime adaptation of The King of Fighters XV. The game was ported to the PlayStation in Japan only.

== Gameplay ==
A match between Gowcaizer and Karin Son

At the start of the game, the player can select from one of ten playable characters, then select an opponent. If the player wins the battle, he or she is given the opportunity to take one special move from the opponent (this is also possible in multiplayer battles). This mechanic is called the Trade System. If the player already has a special move gained from another character, the new special move he or she gets will replace the old one. However, if the player loses a match, should he or she ever continue the game, the player will be allowed access to older weapons earned from past enemies. This game mechanic is similar to the possibility to use other characters' special moves in BloodStorm, another arcade fighting game. One key feature is that if one character has little health remaining, he or she will be able to perform a desperation move to turn the tide of battle. It is also found in the Art of Fighting series, The King of Fighters series and Fatal Fury games starting with Fatal Fury 2.

== Plot and characters ==
In the year 1999, a massive earthquake struck the Kanto region of Japan. Devastating its entire landscape, survivors and the Japanese Government have relocated to a man made island city 115 miles offshore of Tokyo Bay, into a new capitol known as the city of Neo Tokyo. With the greatest and cutting-edge technology into the 21st century, the newly rebuilt Tokyo has become a pinnacle of human achievement and a shining example of the new city of the next millennium.

28 years later, into the year 2017, Neo Tokyo experiences a mysterious and massive spike in crime. Despite all city functions being monitored and managed by its cerebral computer, the surge of criminal activity evaded all government monitoring. With this spike of crime seemingly from out of nowhere, powerful figures known as superheroes aim to make Neo Tokyo a safe haven again. The heroes trace back to the National Bernard Institute, Japan's leading academic institution, and its mysterious new principal, Shizuru Osaki.

=== Gowcaizer (Isato Kaiza) ===
A superhero based on Japanese Henshin and Shounen manga, Isato Kaiza is a hotblooded but virtuous teenager, being a skilled martial artist with an enjoyment of the simple things in life, who is the 2016 Japan national martial arts champion. Upon the arrival of mysterious men, he is given a curious crystal known as a Kaizer Stone, and is requested to attend the Bernard Institute, a famous worldwide academy also renowned for its mandatory martial arts curriculums. However, catching note of the trouble and the vast amount of crime within the island city of New Tokyo, Isato takes it upon himself with his newfound power as the burning hero Gowcaizer to put a halt to the vice that runs deep in his new home.

=== Hellstinger (Kash Gyustan) ===
Based on celebrity double life manga and music promotional materials, Kash Gyustan is the son of a famous and praised modern day British classical music composer. Rigorously raised to be his father's successor in the craft since childhood, Kash grew distant and eventually yearning for a life outside of his father's shadow. Upon a mysterious man with a flaming aura about him and giving to him a Kaizer Stone to find its rightful owner, Kash took to heart the stranger's encouragement to leave home and achieve independence. Along his musical expertise placed into his pursuit of rock and roll, and as a student of Bernard, Kash eventually becomes to be known as the dark heavy metal devil hero Hellstinger.

=== Karin Son (Sun Hualing) ===
A hero based on characters continuing the legacies of real world legends, Sun Hualing is the eldest child of her family raised in a humble remote village in China. Upon her 17th birthday, Hualing is revealed her family's secrets, being that they are the descendants of priests and disciples of the legendary Sun Wukong after his great journey with the monk Tang Sanzang to achieve enlightenment. Being the 133rd successor of the arts of the Monkey King, Hualing then takes off on her own pilgrimage to see the world. Having arrived at the Bernard Institute of New Tokyo, her powers to sense evil pick up on what wickedness lies within, and is determined to stop it to prove her worth of the legacy as Karin Son.

=== Kyosuke Shigure ===
Based on more traditional Japanese manga protagonists in supernatural genres, such as Yu Yu Hakusho or Ogre Slayer, Kyosuke is a young man with a calamitous past and whose heart is filled with grief, and was solely raised by his older sister, who juggled her career as a university student and part-time employment to help make ends meet. At the age of fifteen, his sister then met a man with an odd and threatening air about him; though Kyosuke did not trust him, the man soon manipulated his sister into marrying him, after having noticed something latent within Kyosuke. Sometime after this, upon returning from his part-time job, that man greeted Kyosuke, and promptly murdered his sister in front of his eyes, all to awaken that power deep within him. Having considered that man to have killed the half of himself that yearned and gradually come to learn the meaning of life each day, Kyosuke then learned to harness those strange powers, gaining great spiritual ability. Armed with the Youto Kagura, a spiritually resonant bokken, Kyosuke then embarks on his lone vendetta to avenge his older sister at the hands of the man she loved.

=== Shaia Hishizaki (Shaia Shu Silveianu) ===
A sunny and perky personality, known schoolwide as "Miss Bernard" and a popular idol star throughout the academy, Shaia is in fact an alien policewoman, undercover to find the perpetrator of a Level S Space Crime under the jurisdictions of the Space Federal Direction Control Agency, an extraterrestrial outer space wide policing group to ensure the peace and safety of all known inhabited planets, and kept confidential from Earth's awareness. Although she is a policewoman, she wholeheartedly enjoys the responsibilities, glory and fame her status as an idol has gotten her. She is based on fantastical double life Japanese manga protagonists, from series such as Urusei Yatsura, Di Gi Charat, and DearS.

=== Brider (Ikki Tachibana) ===
A young man coming from a family line valuing the tradition of bancho and ouendan, Ikki is renowned as Bernard's hot blood spirited leader of E Block. After practice one day, Ikki rescued a young puppy he named Katamaru, who was in the way of a car. Having shielded the puppy from the impact, however, he then fell unconscious due to his injuries, and woke up later, strapped to a bed. The man he awoke to, having performed heinous experiments on him, requested his allegiance, but Ikki immediately made a daring escape from the facility and that man's strong arms. Under heavy rain, deep sorrow, and having found his new friend Katamaru again, Ikki vowed that day, in the name of justice, that the man who cursed him with his wretched other self shall be righted by him as Brider, the Transformed Bancho.

=== Fudohmaru (Ranpou Fudoh) ===
Based on ninja manga heroes, a well respected classical literature teacher of Bernard, Ranpou Fudoh is also an undercover ninja of the Fudoh clan, having long been trained in his family's secrets since childhood. With his talents recognized as that of an A Class agent amongst those of the Japanese government with ties still strong to the Tokugawa Shogunate, under the codename Fudohmaru, he is tasked on a mission to infiltrate the ranks of Bernard and eliminate what evils that permeate in its faculty and potentially threaten the country.

=== Captain Atlantis (Randy Riggs) ===
An academically gifted, bashful, and mild mannered American archeology student of Bernard (as well as self professed comic book fan), Randy Riggs eventually stumbled upon a curious looking ancient mask on his downtime. Upon waking up after a blackout having seen drunk roughhousers harass bystanders on his way home, the TV report the next morning revealed that he became the mighty Captain Atlantis, a long ancient hero dedicated to defending good and fighting against evil. He is based on traditional American superheroes, like The Phantom, Batman, and Superman.

=== Sheng-Long (Gouichirou Kaiza) ===
Based on more morally gray and criminal martial arts series, such as Baki the Grappler and Crying Freeman, Gouichirou Kaiza was once the celebrated example of divine martial ability at birth of the Enryuji Buddhist sect of Hida Mountain of Gifu, Japan, being those that teach religious enlightenment through the way of the fist, until in youth at 15, Gouichirou's praise soon became shame upon him desecrating the temple gates of his vain declaration of him being a supreme being. Expelled from his home due to his arrogance, Gouichirou retreated into the mountains to continue his training. At the age of 26, Gouichirou soon encountered a visitor, being a humble monk who also desired to train with him. For the next two years, the two trained in the craft of Enryuji-ryu, but much to Gouichirou's ire, the guest left after having displayed his mastery over Enryuji's prized techniques. Enraged and in jealousy of what the visitor attained, Gouichirou's madness soon saw him follow a violent and bloody life of crime and vice as the evil murderer Sheng-Long. Upon gaining the whereabouts of the man who succeeded him in the arts of Enryuji-Ryu, Sheng-Long sets his sights to terrorize the city of New Tokyo and draw him into the open. He is the only character in the game to not appear in the OVA.

=== Antagonists ===
==== Ohga (Shizuru Osaki) ====
The series antagonist, Shizuru Osaki is Bernard Institute's principal and headmaster, who is said to never be seen in public nor on campus. His origins mysterious, he is a man of deep piousness and faith, who desired the power to attain godhood. Though having followed the monastic paths of priesthood throughout the world to attain this goal, his insatiable ambitions eventually discovered a dark ritual known as the Slaughtering of the Self, an inhumane act of blood sacrifice that would ensure the practitioner become a god themselves. Under the guise of Ohga, Shizuru eventually slaughtered thousands by his hand to fulfill this ritual, and his path of carnage would see him begin upon mastering Enryuji-Ryu's arts. As he attains godly power upon the murder of his last victim, Shizuru soon fell into madness; the godly power attained was that of an infernal god, and fell into despair as he could no longer feel as if reality could keep up with him, as if its limits were trapping and suffocating him. As time further came to pass, he soon began to hear the calling of a dark entity claiming itself as the universe that desired the complete destruction of the Earth, and its desire to have Ohga truly see its course. Realizing his fatal mistake and what would possibly eat away at the last remains of his humanity that would end the world, Shizuru makes desperate efforts to find those who can truly put him to rest before the evil god Ohga within becomes unstoppable.

=== Non-playable characters ===
==== Necrokaizer (Elphie Elphman) ====
Introduced in later CD Drama installments and the Anime OVA, Elphie was the reimagined retcon character responsible for giving Isato Kaiza his Kaizer Stone to become Gowcaizer. She is the biological daughter of Shizuru Osaki; though growing up lovingly with her father in childhood, she quickly began to see her father fall from grace upon succeeding the Slaughtering of the Self ritual, and the torment of the powers he gained upon its completion. Unable to bear the pain of seeing him become corrupted from his former self, she takes it upon herself to steal away Kaizer Stones and grant them to individuals possible to bring her father to peace, as the angelic herald Necrokaizer. She is based on 1990s American comic book heroines, including Image Comics heroines, from Witchblade and members of Gen 13 and Cyber Force.

== Related media ==
A three-episode OVA series based on the game was directed by the game's character designer Masami Ōbari and animated by J.C.Staff released between 1996 and 1997. An English adaptation was produced by U.S. Manga Corps and made into an hour-and-a-half film titled Voltage Fighters: Gowcaizer the Movie. Four drama CDs, an image song collection, and a manga were also released. Similarly, Karin Son and Shaia Hishizaki were re-used in Angel Blade as minor antagonists.

The OVA plot goes deeper into Ohga's mysterious motives for granting Kaiser Stones to individuals, in an effort to stop the true evil force controlling him; a mysterious nihilistic entity formed by human thought and known as Omni Exist. In the OVA, Kyosuke is aided by a dog spirit called Kubira instead of a monkey one as in the game, Suzu Asahina has a separate armour form, and two Briders make a cameo appearance.

== Reception ==
Reception

Review scores
Publication	Score
AllGame	(NG) 2.5/5
GamePro	(NG) 11/20
HobbyConsolas	(NGCD) 87/100
M! Games	(NG) 52%
Next Generation	(NG) 2/5
Superjuegos	(NGCD) 85/100
Video Games (DE)	(NGCD) 58%
Dengeki PlayStation	(PS) 40/100, 45/100
VideoGames	(NGCD) 6/10

In Japan, Game Machine listed Voltage Fighter Gowcaizer on their November 1, 1995 issue as being the eighteenth most-popular arcade game at the time. The game was met with generally mixed reception from critics since its release. According to Famitsu, the Neo Geo CD version sold over 6,285 copies in its first week on the market.

AllGame's Kyle Knight praised the artstyle, character designs and controls but criticized the audio, stiff sprite animations and fighting system. Reviewing the Neo Geo AES version, GamePro's The Axe Grinder lambasted the unoriginal special moves, clumsy and silly-looking animations, unintelligible voice clips, and mediocre soundtrack. Spanish magazine Hobby Consolas reviewed the Neo Geo CD version and regarded it as a very good fighting game for the system, praising the "Trade System" and visual artstyle.

MAN!AC's Andreas Knauf criticized visual department for the jerky zooming effect, unrefined screen scrolling and static character animations, as well as the audio and lack of ideas despite noting the ability to learn special moves from opponents. A reviewer for Next Generation offered no criticism of the game's quality, but found its complete lack of originality to be unacceptable given that the Neo Geo already had an abundance of 2D fighting games in its library. In contrast when reviewing the Neo Geo CD release, Superjuegos' Roberto Serrano praised the audiovisual presentation and gameplay but in the summary of his review, Serrano said that the game lacked an innovations as opposed to the more successful counterparts.
