= Mitsumete Knight =

1998 video game

- Developer: Konami Computer Entertainment Tokyo; Red Company
- Publisher: Konami
- Director: Yasushi Takano
- Producer: Gozo Kitao
- Designer: Yasushi Takano
- Programmer: Manabu Furuya
- Artist: Hideyuki Takenami; Hiroshi Okada
- Writer: Junichi Tamura
- Composer: Atsushi Sato; Hana Hashikawa; Seiya Murai
- Platform: PlayStation
- Release: JP: March 19, 1998
- Genre: Dating sim
- Mode: Single-player

Mitsumete Knight (Note: Japanese: みつめてナイト, Hepburn: Mitsumete Naito) is a dating sim and role-playing game developed by Konami and Red Company and published by Konami. It was released in 1998 for the PlayStation. The characters of the game were designed by Hideyuki Takenami who had previously taken part in designs for Sakura Wars, and specifically, enemy designs for Sakura Wars 2: Thou Shalt Not Die. The game itself was modified from Tokimeki Memorial: Forever with You, with improvements including an expanded area to display backgrounds and larger characters, but the gameplay between the two series varies in many areas.

== Story ==
The player takes on the role of a mercenary from the east travelling to the kingdom of Dolphan, modelled after middle-ages Europe. He has been hired to aid the war fought by the country, which will last throughout the following three years of the game, where the player will meet a number of the different characters and develop a relationship with them.

At the end of the third year and the end of the war, Dolphan issues an order for all foreigners within the country borders to be expelled, marking a sudden departure for the player. If the player had developed a fruitful relationship with one of the girls, she would meet the player and leave the country with the player's character (with exceptions to certain characters).

== Gameplay ==
Much similar to Tokimeki Memorial, on which the game's programming is based, the player chooses one of several options to spend his weekdays and Saturday on, with war-related tasks such as sword training or horseback riding. Other non-combat related options are available too such as grooming, studying and resting. On Sundays, the player can choose to find any one of the girls the player has met and arrange for a date on any following Sunday. Alternatively, the weekend can be spent on the usual trainings. There are periodical sword fighting, horseback riding and beauty competitions to award outstanding stats of the player and to impress the characters. Different titles are given to the player according to the strengths or weaknesses. A second part of the game lies in fighting the war for Dolphan. One of the ten generals of the opposing country will challenge at different times, with about six fights in total. The player will have to fight the general in a simple RPG-like real-time battle. Failure will not result in a game over, nor alter the outcome of the war per se, but the player will be hospitalized for a full week. If the player wins all of the battles, he will receive an honorary title from the king at the very end, and such is the requirement to finishing the game with one of the main characters, the princess Priscilla.

== Reception ==
Both reviewers in Dengeki PlayStation rated the game a 85/100 and compared it to Tokimeki Memorial, with the first reviewer highlighting the similar screen structure and playability and opining that they felt it surpassed Tokimeki. The second reviewer commented that the characters' personalities stand out well, it is well crafted, and if you are attracted by the visuals, you will first enjoy it; however, Mitsumete Knight's storyline for each character was a bit short.

== Sequels and related items ==
- The PS RPG Mitsumete Knight R was released in 1998 also for the PlayStation, featuring various characters of the game returning in the story.
- Numerous CDs were released including an original soundtrack for both the original game and Mitsumete Knight R. An instrumental concerto album was released. The game's main theme song (sung by the voice actresses of the game's heroine, Sophia) was released as a single and later a vocal album was released featuring image songs by the voice actresses who played Lesley, Priscilla, Sophia and Anne.
- In addition to the original sound track, four drama CDs were released, revealing many aspects of the story that were hinted but never clarified, like the truth behind a bomb threat in the church, which occurred in the game. The drama CDs also contain new image songs from characters not featured in the vocal CD.
