= Virus Buster Serge =

Multimedia franchise

ウイルスバスター・サージ (Uirusu Basutā Sāji)
- Genre: Sci-fi, adventure, mecha, cyberpunk, biopunk
- Anime television series
- Directed by: Masami Ōbari
- Written by: Jiro Kaneko; Kazuhiko Soma
- Music by: Toshiyuki Omori
- Studio: Sotsu Agency; Plum; J.C. Staff
- Licensed by: AUS: Madman Entertainment; NA: Manga Entertainment; UK: Manga Entertainment
- Original network: AT-X, TV Tokyo
- English network: CA: IFC; US: Sci-Fi Channel
- Original run: October 2, 1997 – December 19, 1997
- Episodes: 12
- Light novel

Virus: Birth of STAND
- Written by: Masami Ōbari
- Illustrated by: Chitaka Katou
- Published by: Kadokawa Shoten
- Magazine: Shōnen Ace
- Published: April 1998
- Manga
- Written by: Souji Yunaito
- Published by: Kadokawa Shoten
- Magazine: Shōnen Ace
- Published: 1998
- Video game

Virus: The Battle Field
- Developer: PolyGram
- Publisher: PolyGram
- Genre: Adventure
- Platform: PlayStation
- Released: April 8, 1999

Virus Buster Serge (ウイルスバスター・サージ, Uirusu Basutā Sāji) is a Japanese anime television series directed by Masami Ōbari, produced by Plum, and broadcast on AT-X and TV Tokyo from October 2 to December 19, 1997. It is based on the Sega Saturn adventure game Virus, which was made in collaboration with Hudson Soft and Sega and featured characters designed by Madhouse. A light novel and second video game (for the PlayStation) were also created.

In the year 2097 in the city of Neo Hong Kong, man and machine have melded nicely and the city has been blooming with technological advances. However, an entity that takes over the machines called the Virus is becoming a problem. For this problem, there exists the organization STAND equipped with their Gears (machine suits) led by the mysterious Raven. The latest member of the team is Serge, a man who cannot remember his past and thought joining STAND and confronting Raven would help him better understand.

The anime is the only media in the Virus franchise that has been adapted into English. It was licensed by Madman Entertainment in Australia and New Zealand and by Manga Entertainment in North America and the United Kingdom. The anime briefly aired on the American cable television Sci Fi Channel in 2007 and the Canadian cable channel IFC in 2008.

== Characters ==
Serge Train, age 20: Serge is the latest member of the counter Virus organization STAND. His Gear is colored red. He is a man without a past, or at least doesn't remember it. An offer by Raven to join STAND could be his opportunity to remember his past. He has a rivalry with fellow member Jouichirou, and a blooming relationship with member Erika. Voiced by: Shinichiro Miki (Japanese); Joey Rapporte (English)

Erika Tinen, age 18: Erika is a member of STAND's offensive sector. Her Gear is colored pink. She was living in the streets until she was picked up and raised by a caring man. Because she and Serge used to live in the same neighborhood but never met, she finds herself intrigued by this mysterious man and eventually attracted to him. In episode 11, she and Serge had their first kiss and, eventually, had sex. Erika was going to tell Serge that she is pregnant with his child in episode 12. Voiced by: Mayumi Iizuka (Japanese); Vide Jones (English)

Jouichirou, age 20: Jouichirou is a member of STAND's offensive. His Gear color is blue. He's a bit cocky and arrogant and likes to tease fellow member Mirei about her concern for him. He does, however, worry about her and tries to comfort her when needed. Because Serge seems to be better than him at everything even though he is a recent applicator to STAND, he shares a rivalry with him and sometimes calls him "Rookie". Voiced by: Nobuyuki Hiyama (Japanese); Frankie Rome (English)

Mirei, age 15: Mirei is not part of the team's offensive but she is their resident skilled hacker. She may be young in years but she's very intelligent. Erika acts as a big sister towards Mirei. She sometimes gets very concerned for Jouichirou, a fact that Jouichirou loves to tease her about. Voiced by: Haruna Ikezawa (Japanese); Angora Deb (English)

Macus Alexander Bogard, age 27: He's a part of the offensive for STAND. His Gear color is yellow. He may or may not be a descendant of Terry or Andy Bogard; both from Fatal Fury; due to their similar last names as well as physical appearance. He is field leader when the team is out on missions. Voiced by: Keiichi Nanba (Japanese); Michael Schwartz (English)

Raven, age 35: The boss of STAND. He offers Serge the opportunity to work for them after displaying great ability in defeating a new machine taken over by the Virus. He doesn't go on missions or hack but he does supervise the team. He spends most of his time at his desk talking to a mysterious ghost woman called Donna about Serge and how he's linked to their past. Voiced by: Hirotaka Suzuoki (Japanese); Frankie Rome (English)

Donna, age 24: A blond, mysterious entity in the form of a spirit that spends most her time talking with Raven about Serge. She has been linked to both these men while she was still alive and as the story continues, we see just how linked they really are. Voiced by: Ai Orikasa (Japanese); Jessica Calvello (English)

== Episodes ==
No.	Title	Original release date	English release date
1	"Cutthroat Puppets"	October 2, 1997	October 1, 2007
2	"The Path Via Hell"	October 9, 1997	October 1, 2007
3	"We Stand Alone"	October 16, 1997	October 8, 2007
4	"Deep Down Exposure"	October 23, 1997	October 8, 2007
5	"Incubating the Succubus"	October 30, 1997	October 15, 2007
6	"Behold Change Or Die"	November 7, 1997	October 15, 2007
7	"Another Boy Missing"	November 14, 1997	October 22, 2007
8	"Behold Change Or Die II"	November 21, 1997	October 22, 2007
9	"Reactivate the Body"	November 28, 1997	November 12, 2007
10	"The Struggle Within"	December 5, 1997	November 12, 2007
11	"Blend the Strength"	December 12, 1997	November 19, 2007
12	"To Have and to Hold"	December 19, 1997	November 19, 2007
