= List of La Corda d'Oro media =

This is a list of the media references in La Corda d'Oro, the role-playing game series. The following are the media information for the dating simulation game, manga and anime series, and Kin'iro no Corda.

== Games ==
The first game of the Kin'iro no Corda series was released on September 19, 2003, for PC platform. Later, it was then released for PlayStation 2 on March 18, 2004. After that, it was also released for PlayStation Portable on November 10, 2005.

On March 15, 2007, the second game was released, but only for PlayStation 2. A sequel to the second game Kin'iro no Corda 2: Encore was released for the same platform on September 20, 2007. The encore game added a new character, Mari Tsuzuki and made Akihiro Kira an obtainable character. Encore is like a side-game to the second game and is much shorter.

According to LaLa, the magazine where the manga is serializing has announced that a new game titled Kin'iro no Corda 2: Forte is set to be released for the PlayStation Portable platform. It will be released in 3 versions, a regular edition, a Premium box and the Treasure box in February 2009. There's also a new character in the game named Kiriya Etō.

According to the July issue of LaLa in 2009, another new game will be released in August, titled as Kin'iro no Corda 2 Forte: Encore. Mari Tsuzuki, the new character that appeared in Kin'iro no Corda: Encore will also appear in the new game which was voiced by Sayaka Ōhara. Kiriya Etō, the new character in Forte will also appear. The new game will also include a few new events such as staying together for a training camp as well as an after school date.

=== Media for the first game ===
==== Drama CDs ====
- (微風のスケルツォ) – Catalogue number: KECH-1254
- (木漏れ日のソナタ) – Catalogue number: KECH-1255
- Mezame no Kanon (目覚めのカノン) – Catalogue number: KECH-1340
- Kimagure Fūga (気まぐれフーガ) – Catalogue number: KECH-1341

==== Vocal collections ====
- espressivo – Catalogue number: KECH-1256
- espressivo2 – Catalogue number: KECH-1342

==== Valentine CDs ====
- fantasmagoria – Catalogue number: KECH-1280
- divertimento – Catalogue number: KECH-1355

==== Limited event CDs ====
- Happy Time
- intermezzo

==== Books ====
- Official Guide (オフィシャルガイド) – ISBN 978-4-7758-0116-1
- Handbook (ハンドブック) – ISBN 978-4-7758-0123-9
- Complete Guide (コンプリートガイド) – ISBN 978-4-7758-0173-4
- (エキスパートガイド) – ISBN 978-4-7758-0191-8
- (マエストロ養成講座) – ISBN 978-4-7758-0211-3
- PlayStation Portable version Guidebook (PSP版 ガイドブック) – ISBN 978-4-7758-0379-0
- (クラシックファーストレッスン) – ISBN 978-4-7758-0156-7
- (クラシックファーストレッスン2) – ISBN 978-4-7758-0157-4
- (星奏学院学内音楽コンクール楽譜集)
- Memorial Guidebook Complete Information Compilation (メモリアルブック 完全設定資料集) – ISBN 978-4-7758-0247-2
- (ビジュアルブック 君と奏でる夢の組曲) – ISBN 978-4-7758-0246-5
- All Illustration Character Book (オールイラスト キャラクターBOOK) – ISBN 978-4-592-17049-5
- Classic Maru Wakari Book (クラシックまるわかりBOOK) – ISBN 978-4-7758-0491-9
- (コルダ通信 1stコンサート) – ISBN 978-4-7758-0267-0
- (コルダ通信 2ndコンサート) – ISBN 978-4-7758-0344-8
- (コルダ通信 3rdコンサート)

==== Manga ====
- Kin'iro no Corda Carnival 1 (金色のコルダ カーニバル 1) – ISBN 978-4-7758-0187-1
- Kin'iro no Corda Carnival 2 (金色のコルダ カーニバル2) – ISBN 978-4-7758-0188-8
- Kin'iro no Corda Carnival 3 (金色のコルダ カーニバル3) – ISBN 978-4-7758-0224-3
- Kin'iro no Corda Carnival 4 (金色のコルダ カーニバル4) – ISBN 978-4-7758-0258-8

==== Novels ====
- Kin'iro no Corda Kimi no Tame ni Dekiru Koto (金色のコルダ 君のためにできること) – ISBN 978-4-7758-0466-7
- (金色のコルダ 君の音色が好きだから) – ISBN 978-4-7758-0570-1

=== Media for the second game ===
==== Drama CDs ====
- (絹雲のレガート) – Catalogue number: KECH-1419
- (水面のスタッカート) – Catalogue number: KECH-1420
- Ao no Sazanami (碧のさざなみ) – Catalogue number: KECH-1446
- Yuki Doke no Yoko (雪どけの陽光) – Catalogue number: KECH-1450

==== Vocal collections ====
- felice – Catalogue number: KECH-1421
- felice2 – Catalogue number: KECH-1465

==== Background music and monologue compilation ====
- vivace – Catalogue number: KECH-1418

==== Limited event CD ====
- tutti

==== Books ====
- Kin'iro no Corda 2 Official Guide (金色のコルダ2 オフィシャルガイド) – ISBN 978-4-7758-0585-5
- Kin'iro no Corda 2 Complete Guide – Part 1 (金色のコルダ2 コンプリートガイド (上)) – ISBN 978-4-7758-0592-3
- Kin'iro no Corda 2 Complete Guide – Part 2 (金色のコルダ2 コンプリートガイド (下)) – ISBN 978-4-7758-0594-7
- (金色のコルダ2 マエストロ養成講座) – ISBN 978-4-7758-0603-6
- Kin'iro no Corda 2 Visual Book Kimi to Ensō de ru Ensemble (金色のコルダ2 ビジュアルブック 〜君と奏でるアンサンブル) – ISBN 978-4-7758-0615-9
- Kin'iro no Corda 2: Encore Complete Guide (金色のコルダ2 アンコール コンプリートガイド) – ISBN 978-4-7758-0617-3
- (金色のコルダ2 アンコール ビジュアルブック 〜君と重ねる交響曲) – ISBN 4-7758-0629-7
- Kin'iro no Corda Second Series Memorial Book (金色のコルダ2シリーズ メモリアルブック) – ISBN 4-7758-0651-3

==== DVDs ====
- primavera – Catalogue number: KEBH-1071
- primavera2 – Catalogue number: KEBH-1087
- primavera3 grand finale – Catalogue number: KEBH-1132

==== Manga ====
- Kin'iro no Corda 2 Carnival 1 (金色のコルダ2 カーニバル1) – ISBN 978-4-7758-0600-5
- Kin'iro no Corda 2 Carnival 2 (金色のコルダ2 カーニバル2) – ISBN 978-4-7758-0601-2
- Kin'iro no Corda 2: Encore Carnival DX 1 (金色のコルダ2 アンコール カーニバルDX 1) – ISBN 978-4-7758-0639-5
- Kin'iro no Corda 2: Encore Carnival DX 2 (金色のコルダ2 アンコール カーニバルDX 2) – ISBN 978-4-7758-0640-1

=== Media for Kin'iro no Corda: Forte ===
==== Vocal collections ====
- SWEET♪TWINKLE – Catalogue number: KECH-1478

== Manga ==
A month after the release of the PC version of Kin'iro no Corda, the manga adaptation of the game had started to serialize in Hakusensha's monthly shōjo manga magazine of LaLa in October 2003. Yuki Kure, the person who contributed the character designs for the game, authors the manga.

In year 2006, the series has won the Outstanding Debut Award in Hakusensha Athena Newcomers' Awards.

As of March 2011, there are currently 16 volumes of the manga and it is published under the Hakusensha's shōjo manga imprint, Hana to Yume Comics.

The manga has been licensed by Viz Media in the United States under the title, La Corda D'oro. The first volume was released on October 3, 2006. Chuang Yi has also licensed the manga for its English release in Singapore.

Note: The following is the ISBN and publication dates for the Japanese edition.

- Volume 1 – March 5, 2004: ISBN 4-592-18071-2
- Volume 2 – August 5, 2004: ISBN 4-592-18072-0
- Volume 3 – February 4, 2004: ISBN 4-592-18073-9
- Volume 4 – August 5, 2005: ISBN 4-592-18074-7
- Volume 5 – January 5, 2006: ISBN 4-592-18075-5
- Volume 6 – May 2, 2006: ISBN 4-592-18076-3
- Volume 7 – October 5, 2006: ISBN 4-592-18077-1
- Volume 8 – March 5, 2007: ISBN 978-4-592-18078-4
- Volume 9 – October 5, 2007: ISBN 4-592-18079-8
- Volume 10 – March 5, 2008: ISBN 978-4-592-18080-7
- Volume 11 – September 5, 2008: ISBN 978-4-592-18671-7
- Volume 12 – March 5, 2009: ISBN 978-4-592-18672-4
- Volume 13 – August 5, 2009: ISBN 978-4-592-18673-1
- Volume 14 – February 5, 2010: ISBN 978-4-592-18674-8
- Volume 15 – October 5, 2010: ISBN 978-4-592-18675-5
- Volume 16 – December 29, 2010: ISBN 978-4-592-18676-2
- Volume 17 – July 2011: ISBN 978-4-592-18677-9

== Anime ==
The anime adaptation from the manga series, titled as Kin'iro no Corda ~primo passo~ was first broadcast by TV Tokyo starting from October 2006 to March 2007. Kōjin Ochi directs the series, while Reiko Yoshida did the series composition.

The anime is produced by Ruby Party, a sub-division in Koei that produces dating-simulation games that are targeted towards the female audience.

The anime also premiered on Animax under the title, La Corda D'Oro ~primo passo~. It was aired across its respective networks worldwide, including Hong Kong and Taiwan, also translating and dubbing the series into English for its English language networks in Southeast Asia and South Asia, and other regions.

The last volume of the DVD has compiled the special episode together. Even so, it has yet to be broadcast in Japan. However, it was aired on Animax's Southeast Asia English networks.

The series was later collected into 9 DVD volumes.

=== Other related DVDs ===
- Neoromance Fest Kin'iro no Corda ~primo passo~ Seisō Gakuen Matsuri Live Video (ネオロマンス♥フェスタ 金色のコルダ ~primo passo~〜 星奏学院祭 ライブビデオ)
- Kin'iro no Corda ~primo passo~ Stella Concert Encore Live Video (金色のコルダ ~primo passo~〜 ステラ・コンサート アンコール ライブビデオ)

=== Music ===
La Corda d'Oro

==== Opening theme ====
Brand New Breeze – episode 1-24 and episode 26

- Song: Kanon
- Lyrics and composition: Kanon

==== Ending themes ====
Crescendo – episode 1-24 and episode 26

- Song: Stella Quintet

Brand New Breeze – episode 25

==== First selection – Opening Up ====
- Hino: Chopin – Tristesse
- Hihara: Wagner – Under the Double Eagle March
- Shimizu: Boccherini – Cello Concerto No.9 in B Flat Major (G.482)
- Yunoki: Grieg – Morning Mood
- Fuyumi: Max Reger – Romance in G Major
- Tsukimori: Wieniawski – Polonaise Brilliante No. 1 Op. 4

==== Second selection – Something to Believe In ====
- Hino: Pachelbel – Kanon und Gigue in D-Dur (Canon in D)
- Tsuchiura: Chopin – Fantaisie-Impromptu
- Hihara: Mendelssohn – Auf Flügeln des Gesanges
- Shimizu: Saint-Saëns – Le Cygne (The Swan)
- Yunoki: Massenet – Thaïs Meditation
- Tsukimori: Vitali – Chaconne
- Fuyumi: Saint-Saëns – Romance

==== Third selection – Irreplaceable Parts ====
- Hino: Tchaikovsky – Mélodie
- Tsukimori: Ravel – Tzigane
- Hihara: Schubert – Serenade
- Shimizu: Fauré – Sicilienne
- Yunoki: Bach – Partita in A Minor
- Tsuchiura: Chopin – The Revolutionary Étude
- Fuyumi: Schumann – Three Romances No. 2

==== Final selection – Setting Free ====
- Hino: Schubert – Ave Maria
- Tsukimori: Paganini – Caprice No. 24
- Hihara: Holst – Jupiter from The Planets
- Shimizu: Bach – Prelude from Suites for Solo Cello No.1
- Yunoki: Rachmaninov – Vocalise
- Tsuchiura: Liszt – La Campanella
- Fuyumi: Polish Folk Song – Clarinet Polka
- Concert ending special for Kahoko: Elgar – Salut d'Amour

==== Special episode – The Search For That Singular Sound ====
- Hino: Elgar – Op. 12 Salut D'Amour (Accompanied by Fuyumi)
- Tsukimori: Beethoven – Op. 50, Romance No.2 in F major
- Hihara and Hino: Gossec – Gavotte in D Major
- Shimizu: Bach – Suites for Solo Cello No.1, Prelude
- Yunoki: Drigo – Notturno d' Amore "Serenade"
- Tsuchiura: Liszt – Liebesträume No. 3 in A Flat Major

=== CDs ===
- Kin'iro no Corda ~primo passo~ Character Collection 0 -Zensō Kyoku- (金色のコルダ ~primo passo~〜 キャラクターコレクション0 -前奏曲-)
- Kin'iro no Corda ~primo passo~ Character Collection 1 -Hihara Hen- (金色のコルダ ~primo passo~〜 キャラクターコレクション1 -火原編-)
- Kin'iro no Corda ~primo passo~ Character Collection 2 -Shimizu Hen- (金色のコルダ ~primo passo~〜 キャラクターコレクション2 -志水編-)
- Kin'iro no Corda ~primo passo~ Character Collection 3 -Tsuchiura Hen- (金色のコルダ ~primo passo~〜 キャラクターコレクション3 -土浦編-)
- Kin'iro no Corda ~primo passo~ Character Collection 4 -Yunoki Hen- (金色のコルダ ~primo passo~〜 キャラクターコレクション4 -柚木編-)
- Kin'iro no Corda ~primo passo~ Character Collection 5 -Tsukimori Hen- (金色のコルダ ~primo passo~〜 キャラクターコレクション5 -月森編-)
- Kin'iro no Corda ~primo passo~ Character Collection 6 -Kanazawa & Ōsaki Hen- (金色のコルダ ~primo passo~〜 キャラクターコレクション6 -金澤&王崎編-)
- Kin'iro no Corda ~primo passo~ Character Collection 7 -Curtain Call- (金色のコルダ ~primo passo~〜 キャラクターコレクション7 -カーテンコール-)
- Kin'iro no Corda ~primo passo~ Classic Collection -First Selection Hen- (金色のコルダ ~primo passo~〜 クラシック・コレクション -第1セレクション編-)
- Kin'iro no Corda ~primo passo~ Classic Collection -Second Selection Hen- (金色のコルダ ~primo passo~〜 クラシック・コレクション -第2セレクション編-)
- Kin'iro no Corda ~primo passo~ Classic Collection -Third Selection Hen- (金色のコルダ ~primo passo~〜 クラシック・コレクション -第3セレクション編-)
- Kin'iro no Corda ~primo passo~ Classic Collection -Last Selection Hen- (金色のコルダ ~primo passo~〜 クラシック・コレクション -最終セレクション編-)
- Kin'iro no Corda ~primo passo~ Classic Collection -White Day Edition- (金色のコルダ ~primo passo~〜 クラシック・コレクション -White Day Edition-)
- Kin'iro no Corda ~primo passo~ Classic Collection -Lili no One Point Classic Special Hen- (金色のコルダ ~primo passo~〜 クラシック・コレクション -リリのワンポイント・クラシック・スペシャル編-)
- Kin'iro no Corda ~primo passo~ Classic Collection Complete Box (金色のコルダ ~primo passo~〜 クラシック・コレクション コンプリートBOX)
- Kin'iro no Corda ~primo passo~ Original Soundtrack (金色のコルダ ~primo passo~〜 オリジナル・サウンドトラック)
- Kin'iro no Corda ~primo passo~ Stella Quintet players side (金色のコルダ ~primo passo~〜 Stella Quintet players side)
- Kin'iro no Corda ~primo passo~ Extra MISSION: B×B×B (金色のコルダ ~primo passo~〜 Extra MISSION：B×B×B)
- Kin'iro no Corda ~primo passo~ Vocal Collection (金色のコルダ ~primo passo~〜 ヴォーカル・コレクション)
- Kin'iro no Corda ~primo passo~ Character Classic Collection -Tsukimori edition- (金色のコルダ ~primo passo~〜 キャラクター・クラシック・コレクション -月森edition-)
- Kin'iro no Corda ~primo passo- Character Classic Collection -Tsuchiura edition- (金色のコルダ ~primo passo~〜 キャラクター・クラシック・コレクション -土浦edition-)
- Kin'iro no Corda ~primo passo~ Character Classic Collection -Shimizu edition- (金色のコルダ ~primo passo~〜 キャラクター・クラシック・コレクション -志水edition-)
- Kin'iro no Corda ~primo passo~ Character Classic Collection -Hihara edition- (金色のコルダ ~primo passo~〜 キャラクター・クラシック・コレクション -火原edition-)
- Kin'iro no Corda ~primo passo~ Character Classic Collection -Yunoki edition- (金色のコルダ ~primo passo~〜 キャラクター・クラシック・コレクション -柚木edition-)
- Kin'iro no Corda ~primo passo~ Character Classic Collection -Hino edition- (金色のコルダ ~primo passo~〜 キャラクター・クラシック・コレクション -日野edition-)

=== Books ===
- Kin'iro no Corda ~primo passo~ World Navi (金色のコルダ ~primo passo~〜 ワールドナビ) – ISBN 978-4-7758-0488-9
- Kin'iro no Corda ~primo passo~ Cast Ensemble (金色のコルダ ~primo passo~〜 キャストアンサンブル) – ISBN 978-4-7758-0575-6
- Kin'iro no Corda ~primo passo~ Eria Guide Yokohama Stella Map (金色のコルダ ~primo passo~〜 エリアガイド 横浜ステラMAP) – ISBN 978-4-7758-0573-2
- Kin'iro no Corda ~primo passo~ Perfect Tribute -Complete Information Compilation- (金色のコルダ ~primo passo~〜 パーフェクトレビュー －完全設定資料集－) – ISBN 978-4-7758-0596-1

==== Manga ====
- (金色のコルダ ~primo passo~ 4コマ協奏曲1) – ISBN 978-4-7758-0578-7
- (金色のコルダ ~primo passo~ 4コマ協奏曲2) – ISBN 978-4-7758-0590-9

== Kin'iro no Corda ~secondo passo~ ==
A special under the name Kin'iro no Corda ~secondo passo~ was first aired on March 26, 2009, by Kids Station. This special consists on two episodes, where the three new characters that appeared in the later games of the franchise are introduced.

While the production staffs for the series remained the same, there were three new additions to the voice cast that includes Satoshi Hino voicing Kiriya Etō, Yūya Uchida voicing Akihiko Kira and Mamoru Miyano voicing Aoi Kaji.

=== Theme song ===
蒼穹のスコア ～The score in blue～

- Performance: stella quintet+
- Lyrics: Akio Inoue

=== Music In Secondo Passo ===
Hino Kahoko – Sicilienne by Maria Theresa von Paradis

Ensemble – "Ruslan and Ludmilla" Overture composed by Glinka

Aoi Kaji – Traumerei (Dreaming) in F major from "Kinderszenen" (Scenes from Childhood) by Robert Schumann

=== CDs ===
- Kin'iro no Corda ~secondo passo~ Classic Collection

== Radio ==
Kin'iro no Corda ~The After School Etude~ Kin'iro no Koruda ~Hōgako no Etude~ (金色のコルダ〜放課後のエチュード〜) is a radio show that was broadcast by Radio Osaka and TBS Radio in Japan.

The show's personalities are Kishō Taniyama (as Len Tsukimori) and Katsuyuki Konishi (as Shinobu Osaki). In the show, they called themselves Koniyama 30's (こにやま30's), a name made up of Katsuyuki Konishi's and Kishō Taniyama's last name.

After airing at Radio Osaka and TBS Radio, Lantis Web Radio took it up and re-broadcast it as an Internet radio with additional new episodes.

=== Broadcasting information ===
- Radio Osaka: July 8, 2005 – October 1, 2005 on Saturdays at 12.00am ~ 12.30 am
- TBS Radio: July 8, 2005 – October 1, 2005 on Saturdays at 12.00am ~ 12.30 am
- Lantis Web Radio: October 14, 2005 – March 31, 2006 on Fridays.
  - Note: On October 25, 2006, to commemorate the broadcast of the anime, a public recorded special was aired.

==== Segments ====
- July 8, 2005 – October 1, 2005 (Local airwaves)
  - Kīyan Koni-tan no Serifu de Konkuru (キーヤン・コニタンのセリフdeコンクール; Kiiyan Koni-tan's Speech de Concour)
  - Kin'iro ☆ The Latest Lineup (金色☆流行最前線)
  - (五線譜に綴るラブレター)
  - Hōgako Moshi Moshi Box (放課後もしもしボックス; The After School Moshi Moshi Box)
- October 14, 2005 – March 31, 2006 (Internet radio)
  - Serifu de Concour Dai ni Selection (セリフdeコンクール 第2セレクション!; Speech de Concour The Second Selection)
  - Seisō Academy ☆ The School Festival Committee (星奏学院☆文化祭実行委員会)
  - Koi no Medikaru Fata (恋のメディカルファータ; Love's Medical Fata)
  - (五線譜に綴るラブレター)

=== Guests ===
- October 28, 2005 – Jun Fukuyama
- November 25, 2005 – Kentarō Itō
- December 23, 2005 – Daisuke Kishio
- January 27, 2006 – Masakazu Morita
- February 24, 2006 – Hideo Ishikawa

=== CDs ===
After the broadcast, the show was collected into 3 radio CDs and 7 DVDs.

The information is as follows:

- Kin'iro no Corda ~The After School Etude~ Radio CD First Score (金色のコルダ ~放課後のエチュード~ ラジオCD 第1楽章) – Catalogue number: LACA-5429
  - Release date: November 2, 2005
- Kin'iro no Corda ~The After School Etude~ Radio CD Second Score (金色のコルダ ~放課後のエチュード~ ラジオCD 第2楽章) – Catalogue number: LACA-5476
  - Release date: February 8, 2006
- Kin'iro no Corda ~The After School Etude~ Radio CD Third Score (金色のコルダ ~放課後のエチュード~ ラジオCD 第3楽章) – Catalogue number: LACA-5520
  - Release date: May 24, 2006

== Events ==
=== Concert ===
There has been a concert held in Kanagawa Prefecture's City Hall at June 30, 2007 and released on to DVD as Kin'iro no Corda ~primo passo~ Stella Concert Encore Live Video (金色のコルダ ~primo passo~ ステラ コンサート アンコール ライブビデオ). Kanon, Reiko Takagi, Yūki Nakajima as well as the other voice cast and musicians who performed the pieces in the anime were present at the concert to perform.

The concert was recorded and was released as a DVD on October 17, 2007.

=== Stella Concert 2 ===
A live concert titled Kin'iro no Corda Stella Concert 2 (金色のコルダ ステラ コンサート2) was held at Showa Women University's Hitomi Memorial Hall on February 22, 2009.

Unlike the previous concert, the voice casts are not present for the concert, but the performing cast is having light classical concert. The music from the second game will be performed as well.

== See also ==
- Yuki Kure
- Kanon
- Stella Quintet
