= Wu You Ji =

Wu Youji may refer to following individuals of which name in Chinese character can be transliterated to Hanyu Pinyin:

- 武攸暨 (Wǔ Yōujì; born 712), a prince of the Wu Zhou dynasty and an official of the Tang dynasty
- 吳由姬 (Wú Yóujī; born 1974), Japanese manga artist and illustrator
