= Pyotr Gusev =

Russian ballet dancer and choreographer (1904–1987)

- Пётр Гусев
- Born: Pyotr Andreyevich Gusev; December 29, 1904; Saint Petersburg, Russian Empire
- Died: March 30, 1987 (aged 82); Leningrad, Russian SFSR, Soviet Union
- Known for: Ballet dance and choreography

Pyotr Andreyevich Gusev (Russian: Пётр Андреевич Гусев; 29 December 1904 – 30 March 1987) was a Russian ballet dancer, teacher and choreographer.

== Biography ==
He was born on 29 December 1904 in Saint Petersburg. He studied at the St. Petersburg School of Choreography under Alexandr Shiryayev. He was a friend of George Balanchine and joined his Young Ballet group. He graduated in 1924 and joined the Kirov Ballet. He married Olga Mungalova, a ballet dancer at Kriov. In 1935 he left the Kirov and joined the Bolshoi in Moscow as a soloist. He was dancing with such ballerinas as Galina Ulanova and Maya Plisetskaya.

In 1945 he decided to finish his stage career and became the artistic director of the Kirov, then the Maly Theatre (St. Petersburg) and later the Novosibirsk Theatre. He was also teaching at various schools and took up the role of the ballet master in the Stanislavsky Theatre.

He also worked abroad. Especially important was his work in China between 1958 and 1960. He set up the first ballet academies in Beijing, Shanghai and Guangzhou and also taught the first generation of Chinese ballet dancers in those institutions.

From 1966 he taught at the Leningrad Conservatory first as a teacher then from 1973 as a professor. He retired in 1983.

In 1982 the UNESCO accepted his suggestion to declare April 29 as the International Dance Day. He played the role of Marius Petipa in the film Pavlova, a film made for the memory of Anna Pavlova in 1983.

== Contribution to the ballet repertory ==
Pyotr Gusev revised many of the ballets of Marius Petipa and Lev Ivanov throughout his career, though he is often not credited for his choreographic revisions. In 1955 he presented a new version of Le Corsaire with the ballet historian Yuri Slonimsky for the Ballet of the Maly/Mikhailovsky Theatre. Today Gusev's production of Le Corsaire is included in the repertory of the Kirov/Mariinsky Ballet. Gusev's revision of the choreography of the scene Le Jardin animé from Le Corsaire is included in several productions of the ballet, notably American Ballet Theatre and the Kirov/Mariinsky Ballet's productions, and is considered the standard choreographic text.

Gusev also staged a new one-act version of the 1900 Petipa/Drigo ballet Les Millions d'Arlequin under the title Harlequinade for the Ballet of the Maly Theatre, a production that was largely based on Fyodor Lopukhov's version of 1933 for the same company. Today Gusev's staging is performed by several Russian ballet companies.

In the 1930s and 1940s, Gusev created many pas de deux set to music taken from the Petipa/Imperial-era repertory. Among these pieces was Le Talisman pas de deux, the Harlequinade pas de deux, La Esmeralda pas de deux, and La Source pas de deux. Most of these pas de deux are not even original to whatever works they derive their titles from and even contain little to no music from them. Nevertheless, today these pieces are performed by dancers all over the world.

In 1947 Gusev choreographed a new version of the Variation de Gamzatti from the 1877 Petipa/Minkus ballet La Bayadère for Natalia Dudinskaya. Today Gusev's choreography is the standard version performed by ballet companies throughout the world.
