= The Ossan Newbie Adventurer =

Japanese fantasy light novel series and its adaptations

- The Ossan Newbie Adventurer, Trained to Death by the Most Powerful Party, Became Invincible
- First light novel volume cover

新米オッサン冒険者、最強パーティに死ぬほど鍛えられて無敵になる。 (Shinmai Ossan Bōkensha, Saikyō Pāti ni Shinu Hodo Kitaerarete Muteki ni Naru)
- Genre: Adventure, fantasy
- Novel series
- Written by: Kiraku Kishima
- Published by: Shōsetsuka ni Narō; Kakuyomu (June 1, 2018 – present)
- Original run: June 1, 2018 (Kakuyomu) – present
- Light novel
- Written by: Kiraku Kishima
- Illustrated by: Tea
- Published by: Hobby Japan
- Imprint: HJ Novels
- Original run: December 22, 2018 – present
- Volumes: 17
- Manga
- Written by: Kiraku Kishima
- Illustrated by: Ken Ogino
- Published by: Hobby Japan
- Imprint: HJ Comics
- Magazine: Comic Fire
- Original run: November 22, 2019 – present
- Volumes: 14
- Anime television series
- Directed by: Shin Katagai
- Written by: Kasumi Tsuchida
- Music by: Tomotaka Ōsumi
- Studio: Yumeta Company
- Licensed by: Crunchyroll (streaming); SA/SEA: Muse Communication
- Original network: TV Tokyo, MBS, BS TV Tokyo, AT-X
- Original run: July 2, 2024 – September 24, 2024
- Episodes: 12
- icon

The Ossan Newbie Adventurer, Trained to Death by the Most Powerful Party, Became Invincible (新米オッサン冒険者、最強パーティに死ぬほど鍛えられて無敵になる。, Shinmai Ossan Bōkensha, Saikyō Pāti ni Shinu Hodo Kitaerarete Muteki ni Naru) is a Japanese fantasy light novel series written by Kiraku Kishima and illustrated by Tea. It began serialization online on the user-generated novel publishing website Shōsetsuka ni Narō, and it moved to the Kakuyomu website in June 2018. It was later acquired by Hobby Japan, which has published seventeen volumes since December 2018 under its HJ Novels imprint. A manga adaptation with art by Ken Ogino has been serialized online via Hobby Japan's Comic Fire website since November 2019 and has been collected in fourteen tankōbon volumes. An anime television series adaptation produced by Yumeta Company aired from July to September 2024.

== Plot ==
In a fantasy world where adventurers typically start in their teens, 30-year-old guild receptionist Rick Gladiatol quits his job to pursue his dream of defeating the legendary monster, Kaiser Alsapiet. He is taken in by Orichalcum Fist, the continent's strongest S-rank party, and undergoes two years of near-fatal training. This brutal regimen grants him S-rank combat capabilities. However, because he only measures himself against his god-like mentors, Rick develops severe imposter syndrome, genuinely believing he is weak. [1, 2, 3, 4, 5]

At age 32, Rick takes the registration exam, where his immense power accidentally shatters the testing equipment and effortlessly defeats an elite noble prodigy. Registering as a novice F-rank adventurer, Rick takes on low-level chores while completely oblivious to his own strength. He is soon dragged into his mentors' quest to gather rare magical jewels needed to find Kaiser Alsapiet, forcing the clueless rookie to enter a prestigious martial arts tournament and continuously humble the world's highest-ranking elites. [1, 2, 3]

== Characters ==
=== Orichalcum Fist ===
Rick Gladiator (リック・グラディアートル, Rikku Guradiātoru)
Voiced by: Takuya Satō (Japanese); Aaron Campbell (English)
Rick is a former clerk at an adventurer's guild who starts off on his adventuring career by enrolling in the adventurer's guild's examinations, despite being 32 years old. He is underestimated due to his age; but people do not know that he was trained by the greatest group of adventurers in the world, making him stronger and more powerful than the average F-rank.
Reanette Elfelt (リーネット・エルフェルト, Rīnetto Eruferuto)
Voiced by: Saori Ōnishi (Japanese); Dani Chambers (English)
Reanette is a half-dark elf, half-elf and Rick's assistant and companion. Despite her demure and calm behavior, she is known as "The Guillotine Swordmaiden", a powerful member of Orichalcum Fist, the greatest party of S-ranked adventurers in the world. She is open to her feelings when it comes to Rick and falls in love with him.
Broughston Ashorc (ブロンストン・アッシュオーク, Buronsuton Asshuōku)
Voiced by: Kenta Miyake (Japanese); Brian Mathis (English)
Broughston is a warrior-monk orc and the leader of Orichalcum Fist, known as "The Sage Beast" because of his monstrous physique and intelligence to match. He is one of Rick's trainers.
Mizett Eldwarf (ミゼット・エルドワーフ, Mizetto Erudowāfu)
Voiced by: Toshiyuki Toyonaga (Japanese); Mark Allen Jr. (English)
The young-looking half-elf, half-dwarf (but over 50 years of age), Mizett is a member of Orichalcum Fist nicknamed "The Thousand-year Workshopper" because of his reputation as the greatest weapons craftsman in the world, with skills that are millennia ahead of his time. He is one of Rick's trainers.
Alicerette Draqul (アリスレート・ドラクル, Arisurēto Dorakuru)
Voiced by: Misaki Kuno (Japanese); Kelly Greenshield (English)
At ten years old, Alicerette earned a reputation as the most powerful genius vampire mage. She is a member of Orichalcum Fist, known as "The Demon Child of Devastation". She is also one of Rick's trainers.

=== Other characters ===
Angelica Diarmuit (アンジェリカ・ディルムット, Anjerika Dirumutto)
Voiced by: Shino Shimoji (Japanese); Marisa Duran (English)
A B-ranked knight second-rank, and the second eldest of the three siblings of the royal Diarmuit Family who dueled Rick to a loss, and she owes Rick the chance to call her his servant due to the loss. Like all of the Diarmuit siblings, she acts high, mighty, and pompous, but she becomes a loyal ally to Rick.
Raster Diarmuit (ラスター・ディルムット, Rasutā Dirumutto)
Voiced by: Ryōhei Kimura (Japanese); Joshua Waters (English)
Raster is the eldest of the three Diarmuit siblings. Due to his A-rank, he is an examiner for the adventurer's guild. He tried hitting on Reanette, only to fail. He even attempts to derail Rick's exams.
Freed Diarmuit (フリード・ディルムット, Furīdo Dirumutto)
Voiced by: Shinnosuke Tokudome
The youngest of the three Diarmuit siblings who is taking the exam, but is known as a child prodigy with C-rank abilities. He got irritated when he finds out Rick is outperforming him in all of the preliminary exams.
Linx Laulot (リンクス・ローロット, Rinkusu Rōrotto)
Voiced by: Ryuuho Nagaoka
Linx is a B-ranked examiner for the adventurer's guild. He becomes fast friends with Rick because he is also a late bloomer.
Kelvin Urwolf (ケルヴィン・ウルヴォルフ, Keruvuin Uruvuorufu)
Voiced by: Katsuyuki Konishi
Geese Resurrect (ギース・リザレクト, Gīsu Rizarekuto)
Voiced by: Yuta Suminaga
Snape Resurrect (スネイプ・リザレクト, Suneipu Rizarekuto)
Voiced by: Kazuya Ichijō
Alisa Granger (アリサ・グレンジャー, Arisa Granger)
Voiced by: Akira Sekine
Alisa is Rick's junior during his days as a clerk at the adventurer's guild.

== Media ==
=== Light novel ===
Written by Kiraku Kishima, The Ossan Newbie Adventurer, Trained to Death by the Most Powerful Party, Became Invincible began serialization as a web novel published on the user-generated novel publishing site Shōsetsuka ni Narō, before moving to the Kakuyomu website on June 1, 2018. It was later acquired by Hobby Japan, who began publishing it as a light novel with illustrations by Tea under their HJ Novels imprint on December 22, 2018. As of February 2026, seventeen volumes have been released.

No.	Release date	ISBN
1	December 22, 2018	978-4-79-861826-5
2	June 22, 2019	978-4-79-861950-7
3	October 25, 2019	978-4-79-862028-2
4	February 22, 2020	978-4-79-862126-5
5	June 22, 2020	978-4-79-862236-1
6	October 22, 2020	978-4-79-862327-6
7	February 19, 2021	978-4-79-862421-1
8	June 19, 2021	978-4-79-862511-9
9	December 18, 2021	978-4-79-862696-3
10	June 17, 2022	978-4-79-862851-6
11	December 19, 2022	978-4-79-863028-1
12	June 19, 2023	978-4-79-863213-1
13	January 19, 2024	978-4-79-863390-9
14	July 19, 2024	978-4-79-863590-3
15	January 18, 2025	978-4-79-863730-3
16	July 18, 2025	978-4-79-863872-0
17	February 19, 2026	978-4-79-864064-8

=== Manga ===
A manga adaptation illustrated by Ken Ogino began serialization on Hobby Japan's Comic Fire manga website on November 22, 2019. Its chapters have been collected in fourteen tankōbon volumes as of November 2026. The manga is licensed in English by One Peace Books.

No.	Original release date	Original ISBN	English release date	English ISBN
1	May 27, 2020	978-4-7986-2213-2	September 23, 2025	978-1-6427-3507-9
2	October 27, 2020	978-4-7986-2330-6	July 21, 2026	978-1-6427-3552-9
3	May 1, 2021	978-4-7986-2497-6	October 20, 2026	978-1-6427-3579-6
4	November 1, 2021	978-4-7986-2645-1	—	—
5	April 30, 2022	978-4-7986-2807-3	—	—
6	September 1, 2022	978-4-7986-2925-4	—	—
7	April 1, 2023	978-4-7986-3070-0	—	—
8	September 29, 2023	978-4-7986-3260-5	—	—
9	March 1, 2024	978-4-7986-3422-7	—	—
10	September 2, 2024	978-4-7986-3577-4	—	—
11	April 1, 2025	978-4-7986-3719-8	—	—
12	October 1, 2025	978-4-7986-3914-7	—	—
13	May 1, 2026	978-4-7986-4163-8	—	—
14	November 2, 2026	978-4-7986-4335-9	—	—

=== Anime ===
An anime adaptation was announced in March 2023. It was later revealed to be a television series, produced by Yumeta Company and directed by Shin Katagai, with scripts written by Kasumi Tsuchida, character designs handled by Mari Eguchi, and music composed by Tomotaka Ōsumi. The series aired from July 2 to September 24, 2024, on TV Tokyo and other networks. (Note: TV Tokyo lists the series premiere on July 2, 2024, at 26:00, which is effectively July 2 at 2:00 a.m. JST.) The opening theme song is "Arano ni Sake yo Bōkensha-tachi" (荒野に咲けよ冒険者たち; lit. 'Bloom in the Wasteland O Adventurers') performed by Akira Kushida, while the ending theme song is "Sagashimono" (さがしもの; Lit) Looking for Something performed by Chiai Fujikawa. Crunchyroll streamed the series. Muse Communication licensed the series in South and Southeast Asia.

==== Episodes ====
No.	Title	Directed by (Note: Production staff information is taken from the ending credits of each episode.)	Storyboarded by	Original release date
1	"Starting 12 Years Late"; Transliteration: "Jūni-nen Okure no Sutāto" (Japanese: 12年遅れのスタート)	Takushi Shikatani	Shin Katagai	July 2, 2024
Rick Gladiator, a former clerk at an adventurer's guild, starts off on his adventuring career by enrolling in the adventurer's guild's preliminary examinations, despite being 32 years old. Due to his age, he is being underestimated, but people are later awed by the power he displayed. So much that it slighted a noble named Freed Diarmuit, who is also in the examinations. It eventually involved his sister Angelica, who is a knight second-class, equivalent to a B-rank. Angelica challenges Rick to a duel, where the loser becomes a servant to the winner forever. Using her special moves did little, combined with a few trip-ups due to the arena's uneven surface. She eventually lost when she was nearly smashed by Rick's crater-creating punch. As the results of the preliminary exam are about to be released, Reanette, his assistant, says that the rest of the party that trained him are coming to check on him, much to Rick's fright.
2	"Number 4242's E-rank Promotion Exam"; Transliteration: "4242-ban no E Ranku Shōkyū Shiken" (Japanese: 4242番のEランク昇級試験)	Hiromichi Matano	Daisuke Nishimura	July 9, 2024
Rick passes the preliminary exam and is qualified to take the second phase, which is a mock battle. He later comes across Raster Diarmuit, an A-rank who is the eldest son of the House fo Diarmuit, who happens to be an examiner. The obnoxious prodigy of a royal with the strong stink of cologne hit on Reanette, but Rick stopped him by pretending he is her boyfriend (much to Reanette's joy), making him spare no time in mocking Rick but leaves him irritated. Things go up a notch when his siblings Freed and Angelica came to him crying and telling him about "the 40-ish oaf" that bullied them, and now wants to personally handle his examination. Supposedly, it is a B-ranked examiner named Links Laurotte who will handle the exams for those with numbers 4200 and above. He and Rick became quick friends when he finds out Links is also a late bloomer like him. Later, it was announced that, due to Links "suddenly getting ill", it is Raster who is taking over, sending Rick into a panic. All those examinees affected fear for "The F-Rank Crusher", causing Rick's confidence to plummet even more. But he gained it back with Reanette's pep talk. Just as he is ready to take the exam, a fortune teller (Freed in disguise) tricked Rick into sitting down on a chair with teleporting magic. He is teleported nearby, to where Raster's personal guards are waiting to dispatch him. However, they failed as Rick's trainers—all three other members of Orichalcum Fist—crashed the party and disposed of them. Meanwhile, Reanette—also a part of Orichalcum Fist—nearly took Freed's head off and asked where he has teleported Rick, who, just as Freed says he won't make it, makes it back. Rick also finds out later that Raster beat Links up to prevent him from becoming Rick's examiner. What ticked Rick off is Raster looking down on Links' dream of building a school for the kids in his home village. Raster finds out that his guards failed, and expected the arrival of a really fired-up Rick.
3	"A Super First-Rate Elite vs an F-Rank Ossan"; Transliteration: "Chō Ichiryū Elite tai F-Ranku no Ossan" (Japanese: 超一流エリート vs. Fランクのオッサン)	Asahi Iwabuchi	Shin Katagai	July 16, 2024
As Raster tests Rick in front the Diarmuit siblings and the Orichalcum Fist (and Alisa and Reanette having their own cordial "battle"), he tried angering and annoying Rick with all his gloating, but Rick stuck to Reanette's advice of keeping calm and thinking rationally (as she is one of his trainers). Meanwhile, it is explained that due to Rick's low magical reserves—one of the Fundamental Foundational Faculties, a result of his late start in adventuring (magical reserves must be developed before the age of 30), his trainers honed him in the other three—Physical Strength, Body Control, and Magic Control. This means every attack Raster throws at Rick are nothing more than "trifling" and something he can brush off, as Rick is already deemed at S-Rank level, same as them; although he seems not to realize it. It is also revealed how Rick got to that state in just two years—that is, by literally being trained to death (and he gets healed back to life whenever he dies) using space-time magic. Rick realizes that Raster only has big magical reserves and bad at everything else. He keeps brushing off Raster's Nature Composed Magics, and finally obliterates the unfortunate arrogant noble despite his Yggdrasil God Impact, a Level-Eight Nature Composed Magic, using an Air Shot, a mere Level-One Nature Composed Magic, much to the shock of the rest of the audience. Rick meets Raster and his siblings at the hallway after the examination, who gives a few tips to his "adventuring senpai." Raster vows to be his examiner again. Freed and Raster may still be hostile, but Alice finally recognizes Rick as someone legitimate, as shown by her rather kind treatment of him. As the rest of Orichalcum Fist celebrates ahead, Rick and Reanette listen to the numbers of those who passed, awaiting the announcement of number 4242.
4	"The Ossan Becomes an Adventurer"; Transliteration: "Ossan, Bōkensha ni Naru" (Japanese: オッサン、冒険者になる)	Yumeta Company	Daisuke Nishimura	July 23, 2024 (Note: This episode aired at 2:10 a.m. JST, 10 minutes after its original air time.)
Rick's number is announced, signifying that he passed his adventurer's exam. However, the episode focuses on Rick's journey to becoming an adventurer. As a child, Rick dreams of defeating Kaiser Alsapiet, but his parents discourage him from engaging in these fantasies. Despite having a marker indicating a special ability, it never manifests as he grows up, even after becoming a receptionist at a nearby adventurer's guild. One night, a disillusioned Rick, drunk, attempts to protect a lady from a giant troll, a mid-level monster, at a time when monsters started appearing in town. However, the woman, Reanette Elfett, an S-ranked adventurer, effortlessly defeats the troll. She later advises Rick that it might be too late for him to become an adventurer. Concealing his frustration, Rick asks her for a date instead, which she agrees to. On the night of their date, more monsters attack the town. Reanette dispatches most of them but is paralyzed when a dragon appears due to a traumatic childhood experience. B-ranked adventurers, including Rick's friend Zaid, try to help but retreat as per guild regulations regarding dragons. The dragon traps them in a barrier, preventing escape. With nothing to lose, Rick confronts the dragon, expecting to die. However, when the dragon stomps him, his long-dormant marker activates, unleashing his hidden inborn skill. Reanette sees his overflowing magic, which enables him to decapitate the dragon. Rick faints and awakens a week later to learn from Reanette that his magic circuits were destroyed, leaving him practically dead. However, he survived, and Reanette offers him a chance to join her party, the Orichalcum Fist.
5	"Ossan, Trained to Death by the Most Powerful Party"; Transliteration: "Ossan, Saikyō Pāti ni Shinu Hodo Kitaerareru" (Japanese: オッサン、最強パーティに死ぬほど鍛えられる)	Shigeru Kimiya	Shigeru Kimiya	July 30, 2024
Rick invites Laurotte to Orichalcum Fist's headquarters to meet his party. While there, Laurotte learns why Rick ordered him to come wearing his best equipment and also helps him try and woo Reanette. At the end of the day, Laurotte agrees to tell them if he finds any information about suspicious magical energy signatures that match the Six Grand Orbs needed to open the dimension to Kaiser Alsapiet. Sometime later, Rick, Alicerette, and Broughston go on a quest to obtain the orb Laurotte tipped them off about. They are accompanied by an F-rank newbie to give their party the required four persons in order to accept the quest. The newbie is astonished by their strength when they easily take on wyverns and vows to train harder and obtain S-rank. Back at HQ, the party gathers to discuss the red orb they found and use its magical frequency to locate the other orbs--first of which is in Heractopia.
6	"The King of Fists Elimination Tournament"; Transliteration: "Kobushiō Tōnamento Tōgi Taikai" (Japanese: 拳王トーナメント闘技大会)	Moe Katō	Moe Katō	August 13, 2024 (Note: Episode 6 was delayed for one week due to the broadcast of the 2024 Summer Olympics.)
Rick, Broughston, and Reanette arrive in Heractopia. After a little searching, they discover the yellow King Stone is set in the Champion's belt that is awarded to the winner of Heractopia's annual Fist King Tournament--which is currently in possession of the three-time Champion, Kelvin Urwolf. The only way to get the belt, and thereby the orb, is to become a Fighter and win the tournament. To enter, Rick and Broughston must start from the bottom and fight their way to the top at local gyms in order to qualify. Rick's first qualifier is against Angelica Diarmut, who eventually surrenders out of fear. From there, Rick's biggest hurdle is the time limit to qualify for the tournament: he must beat 40 opponents in one week, then fight through the West League before the tournament.
7	"Ossan, the Fastest Preliminaries Qualifier in History"; Transliteration: "Ossan, Rekidai Saisoku no Yosen Toppa" (Japanese: オッサン、歴代最速の予選突破)	Takushi Shikatani	Daisuke Nishimura	August 20, 2024
Angelica finishes her 40th match while Rick psyches himself up to complete his 40 matches in four days. Angelica decides to watch Rick, who completes all 40 fights in record time, leading him to the league matches. Later, Rick meets a dragon-man named Snape Resurrect, chairman of the committee that manages the West League, who gives Rick a warning for Angelica. Kelvin reflects on his past and his excitement about facing off against Rick and Broughston. Rick and Angelica continue to beat their opponents, until Angelica pushes herself too far and loses one of hers. She reveals to Rick that Snape is her fiance and that she believes his reasons for being there are nefarious and she doesn't want to marry him. They also both meet Geith, Snape's younger half-brother and the fighter he is sponsoring in the tournament. After a confrontation with both of them, Rick offers to train Angelica.
8	"Scales of the Heart"; Transliteration: "Kokoro no Naka no Tenbin" (Japanese: 心のなかの天秤)	Hiromichi Matano	Shigeru Kimiya	August 27, 2024
Rick begins Angelica's hellish training, and she tries to run away after five days, but Rick tracks her down and gives her a pep talk. He also brings Reanette in to train Angelica to use her limbs as if they were blades, since blades are her specialty but weapons are banned in the tournament. Angelica wins her next match after a month of training, and Mizett and Alicerette arrive in Heractopia after the search for their own orb was a bust. Finally, the Fist King Tournament begins. Rick, Broughston, and Kelvin all make it through their matches easily, then Angelica faces off against Geith.
9	"The Perfect Prodigy, Born with Absolutely Everything"; Transliteration: "Subete O Motte Umareta Kanpeki na Tensai" (Japanese: 全てを持って生まれた完璧な天才)	Shigeru Kimiya	Daisuke Nishimura	September 3, 2024
It's revealed Reanette taught Angelica her Thread Slicer move, and she successfully lands a blow on Geith. The victory is short lived, however, and Rick barely keeps Geith from killing Angelica, promising to defeat him in front of a crowd the next day. Rick reassures Angelica that she can still achieve her dreams, she just needs more training. At Rick and Geith's match the next day, Rick is enraged when Geith trash talks Angelica's abilities. Despite being able to defeat Geith easily, Rick holds himself back to Angelica's skill level to prove to her how far she can go at her current level (and beyond) with more training. Refusing to lose, Geith unleashes his bloodline technique and turns into a full dragon, though Rick stills thoroughly beats him in the end.
10	"The Strongest Pugilist in History"; Transliteration: "Shijō Saikyō no Kentōshi" (Japanese: 史上最強の拳闘士)	Shin Katagai	Romanov Higa	September 10, 2024
After Rick's victory, Snape ponders on his feelings of satisfaction seeing his brother lose, and Angelica boldly proclaims their engagement is off since Snape can no longer afford the dowry after he bet all his money on his brother's victory. Snape laments the loss, having apparently been genuinely interested in her. Next up, Kelvin and Broughston begin their fight, which is interrupted by Geith going on a rampage in the spectators' stands--Kelvin defeats him in one blow. However, as a result of mass injuries, the match is postponed to the next day. Once their rematch begins, and after a dramatic and emotional battle, Broughston wins, having the utmost respect for Kelvin, who himself proclaims that their fight was the most fun he's ever had in his life.
11	"Fistfight on Equal Ground"; Transliteration: "Taitōna Naguriai" (Japanese: 対等な殴り合い)	Asahi Iwabuchi	Shin Katagai, Asahi Iwabuchi	September 17, 2024
Though Rick intended to withdraw from the tournament, since it's only him and Broughston left, Broughston expresses excitement for their upcoming fight--much to Rick's horror. Rick locks himself in his room and has to be convinced to participate in the match. Mizett explains that Broughston's training regimen for him was basically to train someone who could fight on equal footing with him, since he was always too strong to bond with other orcs in their cultural brawling custom. It's Reanette who finally gets through to him and the match begins. Their battle is intense and emotional, and the episode ends after Broughston declares he will tell Rick about how Orichalcum Fist formed.
12	"Quarter Thumbs-Up"; Transliteration: "Kuōtā・Samuzuappu" (Japanese: クオーター・サムズアップ)	Akira Iwabuchi, Takushi Shikatani	Takahiro Natori, Shin Katagai	September 24, 2024
Broughston details his origin with his own people, how he came to chase after Kaiser Alsapiet, and meeting the other members of the party. After the story is over, Rick gives Broughston the orc quarter-thumbs up, signaling he will fight without defending or dodging. Broughston is touched. Their fight becomes so intense, Mizett evacuates all the spectators except for the members of Orichalcum Fist, Angelica, Kelvin, and Snape. The barrier protecting the crowd shatters and their fight begins destroying the arena. After much back and forth, Rick is nearly beaten but wants to give his friend and mentor the fight he's always wanted and unleashes his inherent skill, Reckless Soul. The fight ends at a draw after they both pass out. Rick wakes up several days later with the Champion's belt and they finally acquire the yellow King Stone. After, both Rick and Broughston refuse the champion title, making Kelvin the unwilling de facto winner. Orichalcum Fist returns home after Angelica tells Rick she'll be seeing them, since she'll be receiving training from Broughston herself.

== See also ==
- Villainess Level 99, another light novel series by the same illustrator
