= Ai Ai Gasa =

Single by Tegomass

from the album Tegomasu no Uta
- B-side: Bokura no Uta; Moshimo Boku ga Pochi Dattara...; Boku no Cinderella
- Released: June 18, 2008
- Recorded: 2008
- Genre: J-pop
- Label: Johnny's Entertainment
- Songwriter(s): Zopp

Tegomass singles chronology
"Kiss ~Kaerimichi no Love Song" (2007)	"Ai Ai Gasa" (2008)	"Tanabata Matsuri" (2009)

"Ai Ai Gasa" (アイアイ傘) is the third single by the Japanese duo Tegomass, released on June 18, 2008, by Jonny's Entertainment. It was used as the ending theme for the anime Neo Angelique ~Abyss~. It ranked first on the Oricon Weekly Singles Chart and charted for 13 weeks.

"Ai Ai Gasa" was certified Gold by the RIAJ for shipment of 100,000 copies.

== Title ==
Literally ai ai gasa (相合傘) means to share an umbrella, but it could also be read as "Love-Love Umbrella", as the word for love (愛) is also pronounced ai. As such, sharing an umbrella as a couple in Japan is considered a romantic expression, and teenagers often draw an umbrella with their name and the name of their crush, the way one would in a heart. In Tegomass's video, the two are creating rain to make a young boy and girl walk under an umbrella together.

== Track lists ==
Limited edition track list:

1. "Ai ai gasa"
2. "Bokura no Uta"
3. "Moshi mo Boku ga Pochi Dattara…"

DVD track list:

1. "Ai ai gasa" (PV)
2. "Ai ai gasa" (Making)

Regular edition track list:

1. "Ai ai gasa"
2. "Bokura no Uta"
3. "Moshi mo Boku ga Pochi Dattara…"
4. "Boku no Cinderella"
5. "Ai ai gasa" (original karaoke)
