= Yumeta Company =

Japanese animation studio

Yumeta Company, Ltd.

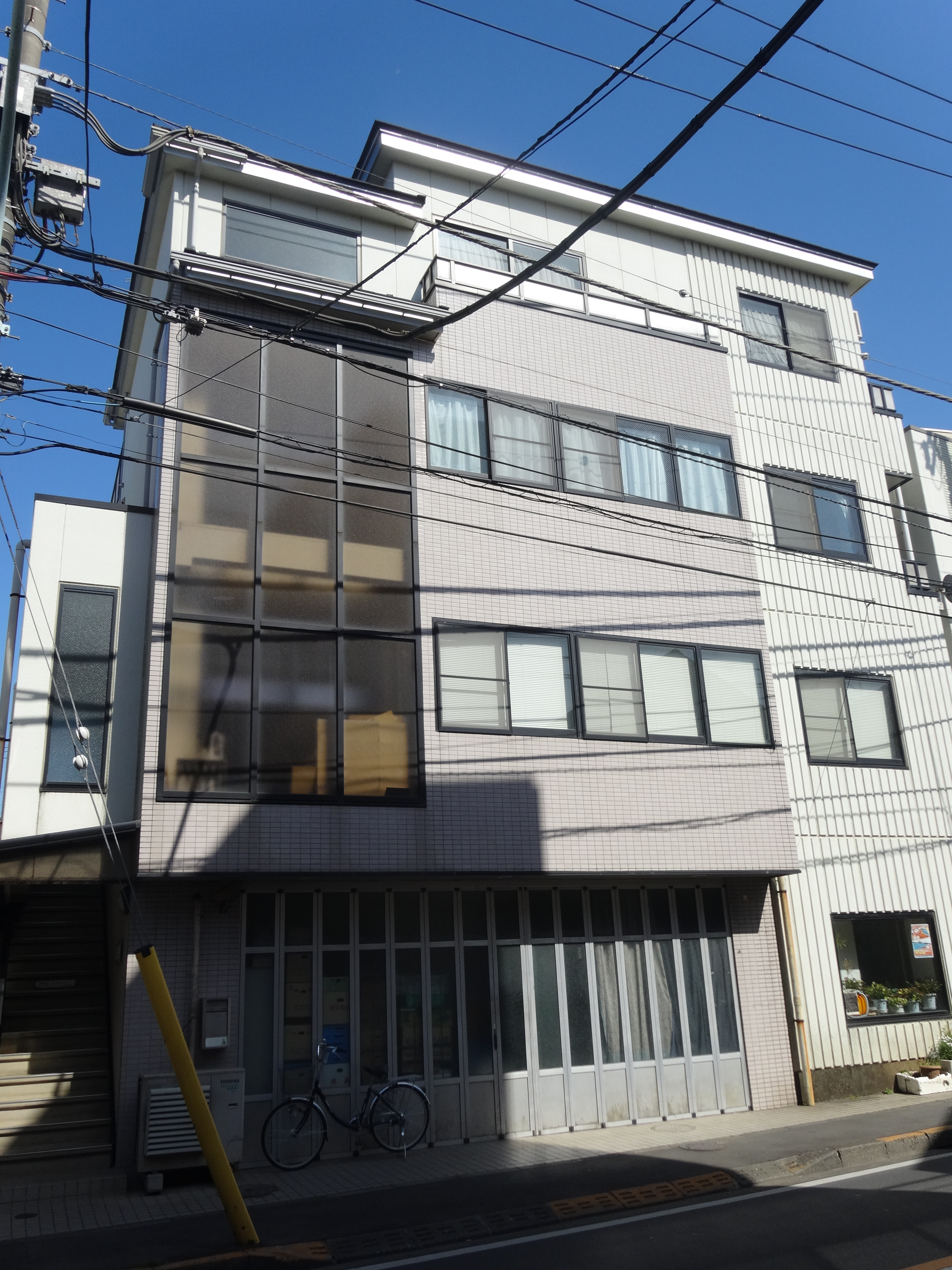
- Yokoyama Building, where Yumeta Company's head office is located
- Native name: 株式会社ゆめ太カンパニー
- Type: Private (Kabushiki gaisha)
- Industry: Japanese animation
- Predecessor: Hal Film Maker; TYO Animations
- Founded: October 1990; 36 years ago
- Founder: Satoshi Yamaguchi
- Headquarters: Matsuyama, Kiyose, Tokyo, Japan
- Key people: Fumitaka Gotou (CEO); Atsushi Urushiyama (Director); Nao Hirasawa (Non-executive director); Satoshi Yamaguchi (supervisor)
- Number of employees: 423
- Parent: Graphinica (Q-TEC)
- Website: www.yumeta.co.jp

Yumeta Company, Ltd. (ゆめ太カンパニー), known as TYO Animations Inc. (株式会社TYOアニメーションズ, Kabushiki gaisha Chīwaiō Animēshonzu) from 2009 to 2017, is a Japanese animation studio formed in 1990.

== History ==
Yumeta Company absorbed Hal Film Maker and changed its name to TYO Animations on July 1, 2009.

On December 1, 2017, Memory Tech Holdings announced that they had acquired TYO Animations, and made it a subsidiary of Graphinica. They also announced that the company's name would revert to Yumeta Company.

== Works ==
=== Television series ===
Television series
Year	Title	Network	Director(s)	Eps.	Note(s)	Ref.
2004	Haruka: Beyond the Stream of Time: A Tale of the Eight Guardians	TV Tokyo	Aki Tsunaki	26	Adaptation of the shōjo manga series by Tohko Mizuno.	
2006	La Corda d'Oro: Primo Passo	TV Tokyo	Kōjin Ochi	26	Adaptation of the manga series by Yuki Kure.	
2008	Neo Angelique Abyss	TV Tokyo	Shin Katagai	13	Based on the Neo Angelique game. Spin-off of the Angelique series.	
2008	Neo Angelique Abyss -Second Age-	TV Tokyo	Shin Katagai	13	Sequel to Neo Angelique Abyss.	
2009	Miracle Train: Ōedo-sen e Yōkoso	TV Tokyo	Kenichi Kasai	13	Original work.	
2011	Mainichi Kaasan	TV Tokyo	Mitsuru Hongo	46	Adaptation of the manga series by Rieko Saibara. Co-animated with Dong Woo Animation. Episodes 97 to 142 only. (2011–12)	
2011	Tamayura: Hitotose	AT-X	Junichi Sato	12	Sequel to Tamayura.	
2012	Ginga e Kickoff!!	NHK-G	Kōnosuke Uda	39	Adaptation of the Ginga no World Cup novel by Hiroto Kawabata. (2012–13)	
2012	Chōyaku Hyakunin isshu: Uta Koi	TV Tokyo	Kenichi Kasai	13	Adaptation of the josei manga series by Kei Sugita.	
2013	Odoriko Clinoppe	TV Asahi	Shin Katagai	26	Based on the mobile video game by GREE.	
2013	Tamayura: More Aggressive	AT-X, Tokyo MX, TV Aichi, NHK Hiroshma, tvk, SUN-TV, TVQ	Junichi Sato	12	Sequel to Tamayura: Hitotose.	
2014	La Corda d'Oro Blue Sky	TV Tokyo	Kōjin Ochi	12	Based on the video game series by Koei.	
2014	Wolf Girl and Black Prince	Tokyo MX, ytv, BS11, CTV	Kenichi Kasai	12	Adaptation of the shōjo manga series by Ayuko Hatta.	
2015	Sengoku Musou	TV Tokyo	Kōjin Ochi	12	Based on the Samurai Warriors video game franchise by Koei Tecmo. Co-animated with Tezuka Productions.	
2015	YuruYuri San Hai!	TV Tokyo	Hiroyuki Hata	12	The third season of YuruYuri.	
2016	Terra Formars: Revenge	Tokyo MX, ABC, CBC, TV Asahi Channel 1, BS11	Michio Fukuda	13	Sequel to Terra Formars. Co-animated with Liden Films.	
2018	My Sweet Tyrant	AT-X, Tokyo MX	Shin Katagai	25	Adaptation of the romantic comedy manga series by Waka Kakitsubata.	
2018	Voice of Fox	iQIYI	Kōjin Ochi	12	Adaptation of the Chinese manhwa series by Guang Xian Jun.	
2019	Re:Stage! Dream Days♪	Tokyo MX, BS Fuji, AT-X	Shin Katagai	12	Based on a multi-media franchise by Pony Canyon and Comptiq. Co-animated with Graphinica.	
2021	Muv-Luv Alternative	Fuji TV (+Ultra)	Yukio Nishimoto; Hiroyuki Taiga	12	Based on a visual novel by âge. Co-animated with Graphinica.	
2022	Cue!	MBS, TBS, BS-TBS, AT-X	Shin Katagai	24	Based on a smartphone game by Liber Entertainment. Co-animated with Graphinica.	
2022	Tokyo Mew Mew New	TV Tokyo, BS TV Tokyo, AT-X	Takahiro Natori	12	Adaptation of the shōjo manga series by Reiko Yoshida and Mia Ikumi. Co-animated with Graphinica.	
2022	Muv-Luv Alternative 2nd Season	Fuji TV (+Ultra)	Yukio Nishimoto; Hiroyuki Taiga	12	Sequel to Muv-Luv Alternative. Co-animated with Graphinica.	
2023	Tokyo Mew Mew New 2nd Season	TV Tokyo, BS TV Tokyo, AT-X	Takahiro Natori	12	Sequel to Tokyo Mew Mew New. Co-animated with Graphinica.	
2024	The Ossan Newbie Adventurer, Trained to Death by the Most Powerful Party, Became Invincible	TV Tokyo, MBS, BS TV Tokyo, AT-X	Shin Katagai	12	Adaptation of the light novel series by Kiraku Kishima.	
2025	Monster Strike: Deadverse Reloaded	Tokyo MX, AT-X, BS11	Masao Ōkubo	10	Based on the Monster Strike smartphone game by Mixi.	

=== OVAs/ONAs ===
Year	Title	Director(s)	Episodes	Note(s)	Ref.
2001	Animation Runner Kuromi	Akitaro Daichi	2		
2009	La Corda d'Oro: Secondo Passo	Kōjin Ochi	2	Sequel to La Corda d'Oro.	
2010	Mudazumo Naki Kaikaku	Tsutomu Mizushima	3	Adaptation of the manga series by Hideki Ohwada.	
2011	+Tic Elder Sister	Tsutomu Mizushima	12	Adaptation of the manga series by Cha Kurii. (2011–12)	
2012	One Off	Junichi Sato	4	Original work.	
2014	Samurai Warriors: Legend of the Sanada	Kōjin Ochi	1	Based on the Samurai Warriors video game franchise by Koei Tecmo.	
2015	YuruYuri Nachuyachumi!	Hiroyuki Hata	1		
2015	YuruYuri Nachuyachumi! +	Hiroyuki Hata	2	Sequel to YuruYuri Nachuyachumi!.	
2015	Aria the Avvenire	Junichi Sato	3	Created to celebrate the 10th anniversary of the Aria anime.	
2019	Cannon Busters	LeSean Thomas; Takahiro Natori	12	Co-animated with Satelight.	
2023	Record of Ragnarok II	Masao Ōkubo	15	Sequel to Record of Ragnarok. Co-animated with Graphinica.	
2025	Disney Twisted-Wonderland: The Animation – Episode of Heartslabyul	Takahiro Natori; Shin Katagai	8	Based on a smartphone game by Aniplex and Walt Disney Japan. Co-animated with Graphinica.	
2025	Record of Ragnarok III	Koichi Hatsumi	15	Sequel to Record of Ragnarok II. Co-animated with Maru Animation.	
2026	Disney Twisted-Wonderland: The Animation – Episode of Savanaclaw	Takahiro Natori; Shin Katagai	8	Sequel to Disney Twisted-Wonderland: The Animation – Episode of Heartslabyul. Co-animated with Graphinica.	

=== Films ===
Film(s)
Year	Title	Director(s)	Note(s)	Ref.
2006	Harukanaru Toki no Naka de: Maihitoyo	Toshiya Shinohara	Sequel to Harukanaru Toki no Naka de Hachiyō Shō.	
2015	Tamayura ~Sotsugyō Shashin~	Junichi Sato	Sequel to Tamayura: More Aggressive; 4-part film series	
2019	Kaijuu Girls (Black)	Yasutaka Yamamoto		
2020	Digimon Adventure: Last Evolution Kizuna	Tomohisa Taguchi	Sequel to Digimon Adventure Tri. Produced by Toei Animation.	
2023	Digimon Adventure 02: The Beginning	Tomohisa Taguchi	Sequel to Digimon Adventure: Last Evolution Kizuna. Produced by Toei Animation.	
