= +Tic Elder Sister =

Japanese manga series

- First tankōbon volume cover

+チック姉さん (Purasu Chikku Nee-san)
- Genre: Gag comedy
- Manga
- Written by: Cha Kurii
- Published by: Square Enix
- Magazine: Young Gangan
- Original run: September 4, 2009 – present
- Volumes: 30
- Original net animation
- Directed by: Tsutomu Mizushima
- Music by: Tatsuya Kato
- Studio: TYO Animations
- Released: May 16, 2011 – July 31, 2012
- Runtime: 2 minutes each
- Episodes: 12
- icon

+Tic Elder Sister (Japanese: +チック姉さん, Hepburn: Purasu Chikku Neesan; pronounced like Plastic Neesan as a pun) is a Japanese manga series written and illustrated by Cha Kurii. It has been serialized in Square Enix's seinen manga magazine Young Gangan since September 2009, with its chapters collected in 30 tankōbon volumes as of July 2026. A twelve-episode original net animation (ONA) animated by TYO Animations was released from May 2011 to July 2012; the first five episodes were released online while the other seven were released on home video.

== Plot ==
+Tic Elder Sister's narrative is centered around three students: Iroe Genma, Makina Sakamaki, and Hazuki Okamoto. They are in a plastic-model building club and interact with each other and fellow students.

== Characters ==
Iroe Genma (源間 色絵, Genma Iroe)
Voiced by: Mari Kano
Iroe is the head of the Model Club, nicknamed "Nee-san" (姉さん; "big sister"). Despite her short stature, her underclassmen (and some adults) call her by this nickname. In contrast, her classmates call her "Chibiko" (チビ子). She is generally vulgar, outrageous and is a big troublemaker. She likes being the center of attention and making fun of her fellow club members. A model of a castle stands on her head before she loses interest in models.
Hazuki Okamoto (岡本 葉月, Okamoto Hazuki)
Voiced by: Yumi Uchiyama
An underclassman of Nee-san, Hazuki is one of the members of the Model Club, nicknamed "Okappa" (オカッパ; "bob cut"). She is a classmate of Makimaki and sits next to her in class. She is generally levelheaded and calm but is prone to getting violent and monstrous when it comes to Nee-san's antics. She is shown to have a gentle and caring side, later attributed to sporadic "Okappa Days". She is weak against insects, especially large cockroaches. She has a model of a train on her head before she loses interest in models.
Makina Sakamazaki (坂崎真喜奈, Sakamazaki Makina)
Voiced by: Marina Inoue
An underclassman of Nee-san, Makina is one of the members of the Model Club, nicknamed "Makimaki" (マキマキ). She is a classmate of Okappa and sits next to her in class. She is the most rational member of the Model Club and plays the role of the straight man to Nee-san and Okappa. She was overweight throughout elementary school before rapidly losing weight in middle school. A model of a tank sits on her head before she loses interest in models.
Kuniki (国木)
Voiced by: Kishō Taniyama
A high school senior, Kuniki is the muscular captain of the baseball team. He wears women's underwear and often exposes himself in public. Because of this, he is well-known even in other schools.
Mizuno (ミズノ)
Voiced by: Masayo Kurata
A 33-year-old teacher, Mizuno teaches Health education. Despite her age and status, she still calls Iroe "Nee-san." She is also the best friend of fellow teacher Masuda whom she affectionately refers to as "Masuda-chan." She has bitter memories of her ex-boyfriend breaking up with her because of a hairy back.
Azuma (東)
Voiced by: Kenji Akabane
A high school freshman, Azuma is often seen with his partner, Student Council Member A. The pair were once cornered by a pair of delinquents but were "saved" by Kuniki. Because of that encounter, they are now scared of him. It is also revealed he lives alone and subsists largely on junk foods such as sweet buns.
Sanada (サナダ)
Voiced by: Daichi Kinbara
A high school senior, Sanada is a classmate of Nee-san. He calls Nee-san "Chibiko". He is a member of the basketball team.
Saotomi Ishihara (石原 里美, Ishihara Saotomi)
Voiced by: Chiwa Saitō
A high school senior, Saotomi is a chubby, mysterious schoolgirl with self-proclaimed "beauty". She believes that hair and skin care is important and usually gives the Model Club her unneeded advice.
Uno (ウノ)
Voiced by: Shiori Izawa
She is the twin sister of Sano. Nee-san usually hangs out with them if she's not with the Model Club. Like Nee-san, she has a short stature and a flat chest.
Sano (佐野)
Voiced by: Yuka Saotome
She is the twin sister of Uno. Nee-san usually hangs out with them if she's not with the Model Club. Like Nee-san, she has a short stature and a flat chest.
Tada (タダ)
Voiced by: Kenichi Koike
A high school freshman, Tada is a member of the baseball team. He likes over-the-knee socks, especially Makimaki's.
Cindy (シンディ, Shindi)
Voiced by: Chiwa Saitō
A gigantic high schooler, she is shown tormenting the twins Uno and Sano and forces them to make mochi for her.
Yuria Himekawa (ユリア 姫川, Himekawa Yuria)
A high school senior, Himekawa is a classmate of Nee-san. Like Sanada, she calls Nee-san "Chibiko". She is a staff member of the basketball team. She is tall, beautiful and has large breasts, and because of this, the boys in her class sent her résumé to an entertainment office.

== Media ==
=== Manga ===
Written and illustrated by Cha Kurii, +Tic Elder Sister started in Square Enix's seinen manga magazine Young Gangan since September 4, 2009. Square Enix has collected its chapters into individual tankōbon volumes. The first volume was released on May 25, 2011. As of July 24, 2026, 30 volumes have been released.

A spin-off manga, titled MeMeMeMeMeMeMeMeMeMenhera... (メメメメメメメメメメンヘラぁ...), has been published in two volumes released on November 25, 2016, and August 25, 2020. A second spin-off, titled Aoikokoro ga chikyū o waru (アオイココロが地球を割る, Aoi Kokoro Breaks the Earth), was released on May 25, 2016.

==== Volumes ====
No.	Release date	ISBN
1	May 25, 2011	978-4-7575-3241-0
2	May 25, 2011	978-4-7575-3242-7
3	June 25, 2011	978-4-7575-3273-1
4	September 24, 2011	978-4-7575-3384-4
5	February 25, 2012	978-4-7575-3518-3
6	December 22, 2012	978-4-7575-3837-5
7	April 25, 2014	978-4-7575-4289-1
8	January 24, 2015	978-4-7575-4542-7
9	May 25, 2016	978-4-7575-4990-6
10	November 25, 2016	978-4-7575-5160-2
11	July 25, 2017	978-4-7575-5431-3
12	August 25, 2018	978-4-7575-5821-2
13	April 25, 2019	978-4-7575-6101-4
14	December 25, 2019	978-4-7575-6444-2
15	December 25, 2019	978-4-7575-6806-8
16	November 25, 2020	978-4-7575-6954-6
17	March 25, 2021	978-4-7575-7165-5
18	August 25, 2021	978-4-7575-7435-9
19	December 25, 2021	978-4-7575-7639-1
20	June 23, 2022	978-4-7575-7988-0
21	October 25, 2022	978-4-7575-8216-3
22	February 25, 2023	978-4-7575-8416-7
23	July 25, 2023	978-4-7575-8687-1
24	December 25, 2023	978-4-7575-8972-8
25	May 24, 2024	978-4-7575-9200-1
26	November 25, 2024	978-4-7575-9528-6
27	May 25, 2025	978-4-7575-9867-6
28	September 25, 2025	978-4-301-00073-0
29	April 24, 2026	978-4-301-00472-1
30	July 24, 2026	978-4-3010-0649-7

=== Original net animation ===
An original net animation (ONA) consisting of twelve-episode of two minute each animated by TYO Animations began streaming on May 16, 2011, The fifth episode was launched on February 23, 2012, and the other seven episodes were released on a limited-edition Blu-ray Disc and DVD release on July 31 of the same year, with the regular edition released on August 22.
