= Aoi Bench =

Single by Tegomass

from the album Tegomasu no Mahou
- A-side: "Aoi Bench"
- B-side: "Aoi Bench (Acoustic Ver.)"; "Sotsugyou Album"
- Released: February 16, 2011 (Japan)
- Genre: J-pop
- Label: J Storm

Tegomass singles chronology
""Tanabata Matsuri"" (2009)	"Aoi Bench" (2011)

"Aoi Bench" (青いベンチ, Aōi Benchi, "Blue Bench") is the sixth released single by the Japanese duo Tegomass.It was released on February 16, 2011. The single debuted at No. 1 on the Oricon weekly charts and certified Gold by the RIAJ. The song is a cover of Sasuke's 2004 single of the same name.

== Single information ==
The single was released in two versions: a limited CD+DVD edition and a regular CD-only edition. The limited edition comes with an eight-page booklet, a 15-minute DVD containing the PV and making-of, and the original karaoke version of "Aoi Bench", while the regular edition comes with a double-sided four-page jacket, the acoustic version of "Aoi Bench", and "Sotsugyou Album". The title track was used as the ending theme for Onegai! Ranking during February 2011.

The song was a cover of the song of the same name by Sasuke.

== Track listing ==
=== Limited Edition ===
CD

1. Aoi Bench
2. Aoi Bench (Original Karaoke)

DVD

1. Aoi Bench (PV)
2. Making of PV

=== Regular Edition ===
1. Aoi Bench
2. Aoi Bench (Acoustic Version)
3. Sotsugyou Album

== Charts and certifications ==
=== Charts ===
Chart (2011)	Peak position
Japan Oricon Weekly Singles Chart	2
Japan Oricon Monthly Singles Chart	7

=== Sales and certifications ===
Country	Provider	Sales	Certification
Japan	RIAJ	101,836	Gold
