= La Corda d'Oro =

Japanese role-playing game

- Cover of the Windows game

金色のコルダ (Kin'iro no Koruda)
- Genre: Musical; Romance
- Video game
- Developer: Ruby Party
- Publisher: Koei
- Genre: Role-playing video game, life simulation game, visual novel
- Platform: Windows, PlayStation 2, PlayStation Portable
- Released: Windows: JP: September 19, 2003; PlayStation 2: JP: March 18, 2004; PlayStation Portable: JP: November 16, 2005
- Manga
- Written by: Yuki Kure
- Published by: Hakusensha
- English publisher: AUS: Madman Entertainment; NA: Viz Media; SG: Chuang Yi
- Magazine: LaLa
- Original run: October 2003 – May 24, 2011
- Volumes: 17
- Anime television series

La Corda d'Oro: Primo Passo
- Directed by: Kōjin Ochi
- Written by: Reiko Yoshida
- Music by: Mitsutaka Tajiri
- Studio: Yumeta Company
- Licensed by: NA: Sentai Filmworks (expired)
- Original network: TV Tokyo, TVA, TSC, TVO, TVh, TVQ
- English network: NA: Anime Network; SEA: Animax
- Original run: October 1, 2006 – March 25, 2007
- Episodes: 25
- Video game

Kin'iro no Corda 2
- Developer: Ruby Party
- Publisher: Koei
- Platform: PlayStation 2
- Released: JP: March 15, 2007
- Video game

Kin'iro no Corda 2: Encore
- Developer: Ruby Party
- Publisher: Koei
- Platform: PlayStation 2
- Released: JP: September 20, 2007
- Video game

Kin'iro no Corda 2: Forte
- Developer: Ruby Party
- Publisher: Koei
- Platform: PlayStation Portable
- Released: JP: February 26, 2009
- Anime television series

La Corda d'Oro: Secondo Passo
- Directed by: Kōjin Ochi
- Written by: Reiko Yoshida
- Music by: Mitsutaka Tajiri
- Studio: Yumeta Company
- Original network: Kids Station
- Original run: March 26, 2009 – June 5, 2009
- Episodes: 2
- Video game

Kin'iro no Corda 2 Forte: Encore
- Developer: Koei
- Publisher: Koei
- Platform: PlayStation Portable
- Released: JP: August 20, 2009
- Video game

Kin'iro no Corda 3
- Developer: Ruby Party
- Publisher: Koei
- Platform: PlayStation 2 PlayStation Portable
- Released: February 25, 2010
- Video game

Kin'iro no Corda 3: Full Voice Special
- Developer: Ruby Party
- Publisher: Koei Tecmo
- Platform: PlayStation Portable
- Released: September 19, 2013
- Video game

Kin'iro no Corda 3: Another Sky feat. Jinnan
- Developer: Ruby Party
- Publisher: Koei Tecmo
- Platform: PlayStation Portable
- Released: January 23, 2014
- Video game

Kin'iro no Corda 3: Another Sky feat. Shiseikan
- Developer: Ruby Party
- Publisher: Koei Tecmo
- Platform: PlayStation Portable
- Released: March 27, 2014
- Anime television series

La Corda d'Oro Blue Sky
- Directed by: Kōjin Ochi
- Written by: Keiichirō Ōchi
- Studio: TYO Animations
- Licensed by: NA: Sentai Filmworks
- Original network: Nippon TV, TV Tokyo
- Original run: April 5, 2014 – June 21, 2014
- Episodes: 12

La Corda d'Oro (Japanese: 金色のコルダ, Hepburn: Kin'iro no Koruda; Italian for The Golden String) is a Japanese role-playing game series targeted at a female demographic audience from Koei. It was adapted into a manga by the game's character designer, Yuki Kure, which is serialized in LaLa magazine.

An anime adaptation, titled La Corda d'Oro: Primo Passo, premiered on TV Tokyo from October 2006 to March 2007. The anime also premiered on Animax. It also aired across its respective networks worldwide, including Hong Kong and Taiwan, and also translated and dubbed into English for its English-language networks in Southeast Asia and South Asia, and other regions. Sentai Filmworks acquired North American rights to the series, has released it in two half-season box sets, and is streaming it online. The first of a two-episode anime special, entitled La Corda d'Oro: Secondo Passo, aired by Kids Station on March 26, 2009, but the season ends on a cliffhanger. Secondo Passo was meant strictly to promote the video game.

== Plot ==
Kahoko Hino is a student in the General Education section of Seiso Academy. One day she runs into Lili, a musical fairy, who grants her a magical violin and a place in the school's annual musical competition. Kahoko refuses, only to be pressed on by Lili until she accepts the instrument and place in the competition. As she practices, Kahoko is amazed that she can play any musical piece as long as she knows the tune and plays it with her heart. As the competition goes on, she becomes more and more attached to the people she is trying to compete with.

== Characters ==
Kahoko Hino (日野 香穂子, Hino Kahoko)
Voiced by: Yūki Nakajima (game); Voiced by: Reiko Takagi (anime and drama CD)
Hino is a second year student at Seiso Academy and is in the General Education department. She has a warm and friendly personality and is very honest and straightforward, as shown from the way she expresses herself through her violin. She remains oblivious throughout the story to the attention of the males surrounding her. She lives with her mother, older sister and older brother, but nobody knows who is her father because there is no evidence.
Len Tsukimori (月森 蓮, Tsukimori Ren)
Voiced by: Kishō Taniyama
Ren is another second year student from the Music department. An instrumental prodigy who plays the violin. Although in the beginning he is depicted as cold and strict, he warms up to Hino.
Azuma Yunoki (柚木 梓馬, Yunoki Azuma)
Voiced by: Daisuke Kishio
Yunoki is popular third year student with a gentle and graceful demeanor. His specialty is the flute. He has been best friends with Kazuki and supports him in everything he does. Yunoki is in the Music department in Seiso High.
Keiichi Shimizu (志水 桂一, Shimizu Keiichi)
Voiced by: Jun Fukuyama
Shimizu is a first year student whose specialty is the cello. He has angelic eyes and often sleeps. His world revolves around his cello, telling Hino that his main schedule is "sleeping, waking up, playing the cello, sleeping again". Other than that Shimizu goes to the library frequently and goes to concerts as much as he can.
Kazuki Hihara (火原 和樹, Hihara Kazuki)
Voiced by: Masakazu Morita
Kazuki is a carefree and energetic third year student from the Music department. He is the best friend of Azuma and supports him in everything he does. His specialty is the trumpet.
Ryotaro Tsuchiura (土浦 梁太郎, Tsuchiura Ryōtarō)
Voiced by: Kentarō Itō / Voiced by: Ayumi Tsunematsu (young Tsuchiura)
Tsuchiura is a student from the General Education department. He plays soccer and his specialty is the piano. Tsuchiura always helps Hino because she was the reason he started playing piano again. Like Hino, Tsuchiura is straight-forward and honest which he shows through his performance in the last selection.
Shoko Fuyuumi (冬海 笙子, Fuyuumi Shōko)
Voiced by: Akemi Satō
Shoko is a timid first-year student from the Music department who admires Hino very much. Her specialty is the clarinet and she also can play the piano. She often becomes frightened by loud voices. Her parents are rich, so they usually go to her pensions for training and stuff.
Nao Kobayashi (小林 直, Kobayashi Nao) & Mio Takato (高遠 美緒, Takatō Mio)
Voiced by: Eri Nakao and Satomi Arai
Nao and Mio Hino's best friends who help her when she is in trouble.
Lili (リリ, Riri)
Voiced by: Kaori Mizuhashi
Lili is a mischievous fairy who gave Hino the magical violin and almost invisible by people.
