= Neo Angelique Abyss =

Japanese anime television series

- Neo Angelique ~Abyss~

ネオアンジェリーク Abyss
- Genre: Reverse Harem, Fantasy
- Anime television series
- Directed by: Shin Katagai
- Produced by: Shinji Horikiri; Satoshi Yamaguchi; Takuto Kumagai; Wataru Senoo
- Written by: Yuka Yamada
- Music by: Hikaru Nanase
- Studio: Yumeta Company
- Licensed by: NA: Sentai Filmworks
- Original network: TV Tokyo, Arts Central
- Original run: April 6, 2008 – June 29, 2008
- Episodes: 13
- Anime television series

Neo Angelique Abyss -Second Age-
- Directed by: Shin Katagai
- Produced by: Shinji Horikiri; Satoshi Yamaguchi; Takuto Kumagai; Wataru Senoo
- Written by: Yuka Yamada
- Music by: Hikaru Nanase
- Studio: Yumeta Company
- Licensed by: NA: Sentai Filmworks
- Original network: TV Tokyo, Arts Central
- Original run: July 6, 2008 – September 14, 2008
- Episodes: 13

Neo Angelique ~Abyss~ (ネオアンジェリーク Abyss) is a spin-off of the Angelique series and is based on the Neo Angelique game. Yumeta Company started broadcasting the anime on April 6, 2008. The anime introduces four new characters that did not appear in the game. A sequel to the first season of the anime has been announced by Koei, the creators of the Angelique series and games. The second season Neo Angelique Abyss -Second Age- aired immediately after the first. The first season has been licensed in North America by Sentai Filmworks and is distributed by Section23 Films. The first season collection was released on January 26, 2010. The second season of Neo Angelique ~Abyss~ was also picked up by Sentai and released on March 30, 2010.

== Plot ==
The story takes place in a fictional world called Arcadia, where life-draining monsters called Thanatos plague the villages and the Sacred Capital. The only ones who have the power to exterminate these creatures are Purifiers, but only a few exist. One day, Angelique, who is just a presumably normal girl attending school, is visited by Nyx, a rich gentleman as well as a Purifier, who created an organization of Purifiers dedicated to exterminating Thanatos. Nyx is interested in the potential power she possesses and invites her to join his organization, but she refuses since she wants to become a doctor, like her father. However, when her school is later attacked by Thanatos, she ends up activating her powers in her wanting to protect those in danger. After purifying the creature, she finds out she has a unique purifying power, and that she is the one that has been foretold in legends, the "Queen's Egg". It is then that her journey begins, and she becomes the only female Purifier in the world. She then goes off to Sunlit Mansion where another Purifier, as well as researcher resides: Rayne.

== Characters ==
Angelique (アンジェリーク, Anjerīku)
Voiced by: Aya Endo
Age: 16
Height: 166 cm

A charming, kindhearted girl. When she was a child, her village was attacked by Thanatos and she lost both her parents. This inspired and encouraged her more than anything to pursue her ambition to be a doctor when she grew up as she wants to help others and save lives. This is why she agreed to go with Nyx to fight Thanatos with the other Purifying Ability Compatibles as she felt that this way, she would be able to save more lives than as a doctor. She has a modest and reserved personality, but she also possesses inner strength and can be severe. It has always been her wish to help others as she, like her parents, always places others before herself. In the second season, she learns how to use a sword. It has been revealed later on in the second season that in order to save Arcadia and Nyx she must sacrifice the life she has as a normal girl among her loving friends and become the Prophesied Queen, protecting Arcadia yet from far away.

Rayne (レイン, Rein)
Voiced by: Hiroki Takahashi
Age: 18
Height: 181 cm

A smart, stylish boy. He is impulsive, but extremely capable and reliable. In the past he worked as a scientist and a professor, being an important member of the Foundation with his older brother Yorgo. He also has feelings for Angelique. Rayne is referred to as "that guy" (ano hito) by Erenfried, as Erenfried has a particular dislike for Rayne. Erenfried has always been jealous of all the attention that Rayne got from Yorgo and other researches in the Foundation when he worked there. He gets annoyed whenever referred to as "Professor" Rayne, which Erenfried does on purpose, and usually responds by calling him simply "Eren". Rayne later reveals his Purifying Ability is not natural and is the result of self-experimentation. He fights Thanatos with a gun.

Nyx (ニクス, Nikusu)
Voiced by: Toru Ohkawa
Age: 26
Height: 179 cm

He is a mysterious nobleman and quite a gentleman. Rather than calling Angelique by her name, he often calls her "mademoiselle". He likes playing the piano and drinking tea. In season 2 he is fully possessed by Erebos and wants to help Angelique and the others, but cannot always control his condition. Inside him, his real self and Erebos coexist. He has lived for 200 years due to Erebos. When he was younger, the ship his family and he were in got caught in a fierce storm. As Nyx was drowning, he pleaded for his life, saying that he would do anything. Erebos heard him and saved him, possessing him, but Nyx's parents drowned. This is why Nyx fears and hates the sound of the sea as it was when Erebos first possessed him. He is the core that Erebos uses to send Thanatos into the world. The only hope he had to get rid of Erebos was the Queen's Egg, so he travelled all over the world and found Angelique. When she becomes the Queen, Nyx wishes for her to give him a peaceful death. Nyx blames himself for making Angelique suffer, taking away her home and parents but Angelique says it was Erebos who did that and that Nyx was the one who gave her many precious things, including a place to belong to. He fights Thanatos with a whip.

JD (ジェイド, Jado)
Voiced by: Masaya Onosaka
Age: 20
Height: 195 cm

Jade (JD) is a Jasper Doll, a type of artifact and biological weapon. He Is referred to as a "defective product" by Jet. JD also said that he (Jet) is just like him (himself). JD belonged to the Foundation, but somehow managed to escape to a nearby forest after a lab accident. In the forest, he was found by the Dragon Tribe, and became the tribe leader's adoptive son. Kai, a young boy, befriended him, and visited him every day even though he did not show any emotions. One day, he took interest in a sunflower, and from that day on, he started to smile and show more emotion. After Kai died, he embarked on a journey to make people smile. In fear of being taken away by force, he avoided meeting the Foundation as much as he could. He always wants to see Angelique smile. He enjoys baking for others, often cookies or scones. He fights with a pair of tonfa against Thanatos but possesses melee skills as well.

Hyuuga (ヒュウガ, Hyūga)
Voiced by: Daisuke Ono
Age: 22
Height: 186 cm

A former Silver Knight and also an Aube Hunter. He will protect Angelique with all his being, even in exchange of his life. He refers to Angelique as "Angelique-sama" (Lady Angelique). He is often seen practicing his spear skills during his free time outside the Mansion. At the end of the first season, Angelique gave him an "order" that in the future, he was to simply call her Angelique as she felt that they were friends. Hyuuga has a hard time trying to say Angelique's name without saying it in a formal form in the beginning. In Season 2 he suffers from seasickness but eventually overcomes it. It is later revealed that he left the Silver Knights after killing Carlyl. He wields a spear in battle against Thanatos.

Rene (ルネ, Rune)
Voiced by: Kappei Yamaguchi
Age: 15
Height: 165 cm

He lives in the Holy City of Celestizam and is allowed to move about freely within its walls but he is forbidden to go outside the city. He often comments how he is a "caged bird" to Mathias, who is his mentor. His second appearance in the anime is in episode 6, where he rescues Angelique from the persistent journalist Roche, who keeps trying to take photos of "The Queen's Egg" to get a scoop. He is revealed to be the future and true leader of the Religious Order. He declares that he will unite his power with Angelique's to help save the world of Arcadia.

Bernard (ベルナール, Bernard)
Voiced by: Daisuke Hirakawa
Age: 29
Height: 182 cm

A reporter who always writes the truth. Roche sells a lot of his pictures to Bernard, since he's his tipster. He recognizes Angelique's necklace when she loses it after being kidnapped by Jet and seems to be hiding something. Later on he is revealed to be a son of Angelique's relative whom she stayed with after her parents were killed. He left to go work in the media and never saw Angelique again until now. Angelique calls him "nii-san" (big brother), after she finds out who he is.

Mathias (マティアス, Matiasu)
Voiced by: Taiten Kusunoki
Age: 28
Height: 180 cm

Also known as Lord Mathias or Mathias-sama, and he is the Leader of the Religious Organization which supports the Knights of the Silver Tree. It is revealed that he is a fake Leader that was only chosen for his exceptional memory, because a new true leader hadn't been born at the time that the previous leader died. The Organization is trying to kill him so that Rene can take the title, but in Season 2's episode 5, he kills the High Elder. He places an Artifact chip created by Erenfried on his neck to receive powers. Due to the chip, half of Mathias is his own self, half is controlled by the chip (therefore by Thanatos). He is killed by Nyx/Erebos when trying to protect Rene.

Erenfried (エレンフリート, Elenfurīto)
Voiced by: Miyu Irino
Age: 14
Height: 163 cm

He is a scientist that works at the Foundation who bears deep hatred for Rayne, since he always got all the attention. He gets angry or annoyed when Rayne simply calls him "Eren", telling him that he has a name and it is "Erenfried", and responds by calling Rayne "Professor". Jet takes orders from Erenfried and Director Yorgo, whose attention Erenfried always intends to get. Erenfried admires and is grateful to Director Yorgo because he offered him a place as a researcher in the Foundation and assigned funding to his project. In season 2 when Yorgo is imprisoned (due to mistakes of Erenfried with the Jinx project), he wants to rescue him. He somewhat befriends Angelique and company in season 2, when JD rescues him from the organization's prison, and stays with the group for a while. He also realizes that "Artifacts/Jasper Dolls" have hearts when JD rescues him from jail. He also says he will see Angelique at the moment he's staring down at Jet's in cased body.

Jet (ジェット, Jetto)
Voiced by: Yuichi Nakamura
Age: 20
Height: 195 cm

Like JD, he is also an artifact made by the Foundation in a desperate attempt to make another Artifact like JD, after they "lost" him during the mysterious fire. The fact that Jet and JD are both artifacts makes them "brothers". In season 2, he takes order from Mathias. However, Mathias abandons him as he failed to complete his mission to capture Angelique, the Queen's Egg. Mathias tells him to "go wherever he wants". Without a master and orders to follow, he was lost and attempted to carry out the last order he had been given (to capture Angelique), when he came across Angelique and her friends. He and JD began to fight, but he left after he saw that it was upsetting Angelique. He then showed up where they were repairing the Ship of Stars and tells Erenfried to deactivate him because he was beginning to have feelings (primarily around Angelique) and he considered himself "defective". Erenfried refused because it meant that Jet was developing a heart and told him to act according to his own will from now on. Therefore he helps out in the repairs of the Ship Of Stars, but in the morning of the departure, he sacrificed his life to remove the bomb that Erebos planted in the ship. However, he seems to have been saved by Erenfried in the last episode of season 2 (he is seen at the very end in a capsule being taken care of).

Roche (ロシュ, Roshu)
Voiced by: Ryohei Kimura
Age: 17
Height: 174 cm

Roche is a respectable journalist who loves money and women. He has never taken photos without receiving a payment for them, but in episode 9, he sent the photos he took of Angelique - which he had originally intended to sell to Bernard for money - to Angelique herself. This was done out of kindness when he realized that Angelique, like himself, was an orphan and he didn't feel that he should sell her information to others. He, however, did not regret making that decision and was a bit confused and surprised at himself as that was the first time he had taken photos of other people without charging for them. The "secret date" he went on with Angelique was not a real date. He happened to see Angelique on the streets after Angelique ran from Sally and Hannah, since she was upset about her best friends refusing to accept the truth (the fact that the Jinx machines were destroying many people's homes and even taking away some lives in the process of destroying Thanatos). He called it a "secret date" but in truth, he wanted to cheer up Angelique when he saw just how upset she was. He eventually develops romantic feelings towards Angelique, telling an Erebos-possessed Nyx that he has a "date with Angelique" which he cannot miss when he is attacked by him. He is shown throwing knives in his fight with Erebos/Nyx.

== Others ==
Yorgo

Rayne's elder brother. He is the Director of the Artifact Foundation. Erenfried desperately tries to save him by appealing to Mathias, but instead, he is thrown into jail. Yorgo is then rescued by Erenfried within moments of his execution.

Ervin

Angelique's pet cat, who led Angelique to an injured Rayne and later to JD. He does not like Nyx, hissing when he tried to pet him, showing that he sensed the power of Erebos. He seems to have a mysterious ability when Angelique's tears touch his fur. It is revealed in the final episode of the series that Ervin was actually a medium for the congregate of all universal consciousness. A being that watched over Angelique and guided her journey to becoming Queen and arriving in the Holy Land.

Hannah And Sally

Angelique's friends, who appeared in only a few episodes.

Village Elder Of The Kozu Dragon Tribe

JD's "father", the one who found JD and claims him as his son.

Kai

He is JD's first friend; he was the first person who made JD smile. He was often seen smiling and singing a song to others, bringing JD with him wherever he went. He loved sunflowers and said that they appeared to be smiling all the time. He died of an unknown plague.

Rouki

The first person to greet Angelique and Hyuuga when they arrived at the Dragon Tribe village. She was Kai's friend. She showed Angelique and Hyuuga Kai's grave and told them about JD's past.

Carlyle

He was a friend of Hyuuga when he was still with the Knights of the Silver Tree. He was born into a family of knights and trained from a young age. He was thought to be the one to earn the "Holy Knight" title but Hyuuga got it instead. He died in the Tower of Dreaming Souls near Thunder Village because he inserted an Artifact chip (similar to the one Mathias has) on his neck to receive powers, but could not control them. He got possessed by Thanatos and his soul left him, while his body stayed at the Tower possessed by Thanatos. His soul became a shining butterfly, which throughout the series followed Hyuuga. Angelique noticed the butterfly when she first met Hyuuga, following it into the forest where the former knight was. In Season 2, at the end of episode 4, the butterfly disappears into the sky, meaning that his soul had ascended into heaven and he was now at peace.

Dion

A member of the Knights of the Silver Tree and old friend of Hyuuga and Carlyle.

Sedona

A tomboyish girl that appears in the second season. Angelique, JD, Rayne and Hyuuga met her while travelling. After the Hidamari Mansion was burnt down, the group disappeared, and the Thanatos numbers increased, the people of Arcadia started to blame everything on Angelique and the "Aube Hunters". While the group was passing by a village, looking for a place to rest, a group of men cornered Angelique after she wandered off, trying to kill her due to their recognizing her as the "Queen's Egg". Sedona beat them up and saved Angelique. Afterwards, the group follows Sedona to her ship (of which she's the captain), where they stay for a while. She's rather skilled with the sword and she taught Angelique when she requested it. When they first met, Sedona didn't want to tell Angelique her name when she asked, because they weren't friends, so she told her to just call her "Captain". When they parted, she gave Angelique the fighting clothes and the sword she had lent her for practice as parting gifts, and she told her she could call her "Sedona", as they were now friends.

== Theme songs ==
=== First season ===
Opening theme
"Joy to the World" by Hiroki Takahashi, Toru Ohkawa, Masaya Onosaka, and Daisuke Ono

Ending theme
"Ai Ai Gasa" by Tegomass

=== Second season ===
Opening theme
"Silent Destiny" by Ōbuhantā 4 (Hiroki Takahashi, Toru Ohkawa, Masaya Onosaka, and Daisuke Ono)

Ending theme
"Kataomoi no Chiisana Koi" (片想いの小さな恋) by Tegomass

== See also ==
- Angelique
