= Tegomass =

Japanese musical duo

Tegomass テゴマス
- Also known as: Tegomasu
- Origin: Tokyo, Japan
- Genre: Pop
- Years active: 2006–2020
- Label: Johnny's Entertainment
- Spinoff of: NEWS
- Members: Yuya Tegoshi; Takahisa Masuda
- Website: www.johnnys-entertainment.co.jp/

Tegomass (テゴマス, Tegomasu) was a Japanese duo consisting of NEWS members Yuya Tegoshi and Takahisa Masuda, formed to promote Johnny's Entertainment internationally. The group's name is a merging of Tegoshi's and Masuda's names.

== History ==
Tegomass released their first single "Miso Soup" in Sweden in November 2006 and held several promotions there. A month later, the duo released the Japanese version of the single in Japan. The next single, "Kiss (Kaerimichi no Love Song)", was released on May 16, 2007. The songs on this second single were used as theme songs for the Lovely Complex anime, with the title track as the ending theme, and the second track, "Kimi + Boku = Love?", as the opening theme. On June 18, 2008, the duo released its third single, "Ai Ai Gasa", the ending theme for the anime Neo Angelique Abyss.

On July 8, 2009, the duo released a fourth single, "Tanabata Matsuri". It went to #1, selling 80,243 copies in the first week (total sales so far - 100,714). Tegomass' first album, Tegomasu no Uta, was released on July 15, 2009. Tegomasu no Uta went to #1, selling 80,028 copies in the first week, with total sales so far of 99,534.

The mini-album Tegomass no Ai was released in April 2010, shortly before the second tour, named after Tegomass no Ai, which started in May, 2010.

"Tanabata Matsuri" and Tegomasu no Uta were both certified Gold for shipment of 100,000 copies. Tegomass's first live tour DVD was released on January 20, 2010.

Tegomass 3rd album "Tegomass no Mahou" released on October 19, 2011, and top the Oricon chart. Their third concert was held that same year.

On June 19, 2020, Tegoshi ended his contract with Johnny's Entertainment, effectively breaking up Tegomass as well.

== Tegomass in Sweden ==
Tegomass made a promotional trip to Sweden from November 14 to 17 in 2006. On 14 November, they were occupied with various interviews for TV and newspapers, but on the 15th they held a promotion event at SpyBar in Stockholm. Here Tegomass performed "Miso Soup" in English as well as "Hajimete no Asa" live on stage. After their performance, Tegomass held a hand-shaking event for all the fans who were also able to say a few words to them. The Swedish edition of the single (including "Miso Soup" in English and as a karaoke track) could be bought during this event, along with a Swedish edition of Shuuji to Akira's "Seishun Amigo" single. The same night, from around 7:30 to 10:00 pm, there was a release party, also at SpyBar, for journalists and fans over 20 years of age who signed up on the guest list.

== Musical style ==
Tegomass specializes in the aforementioned Bacharach-style ballads.

== Discography ==
=== Albums ===
List of albums, with selected chart positions
Title	Album details	Peak positions			Certifications
Title	Album details	JPN	TWN (Note: The G-Music chart was established in July 2005 and only archives the top 20 releases.)	TWN East Asian (Note: Position was taken from 2009 week 31 for Tegomass no Uta, 2011 week 45 for Tegomass no Mahō, 2014 week 10 for Tegomass no Seishun.)	Certifications
Tegomass no Uta	Released: July 15, 2009; Label: Johnny's Entertainment; Formats: CD, CD/DVD	1	4	1	RIAJ: Gold
Tegomass no Mahō (テゴマスのまほう; "Tegomass Magic"")	Released: October 19, 2011; Label: Johnny's; Formats: CD, CD/DVD	1	11	1	
Tegomass no Seishun (テゴマスの青春; "Tegomass Youth"")	Released: January 22, 2014; Label: Johnny's; Formats: CD, CD/DVD	2	—	5	

=== Extended plays ===
List of albums, with selected chart positions
Title	Album details	Peak positions			Certifications
Title	Album details	JPN	TWN	TWN East Asian (Note: Position was taken from 2010 week 19 for Tegomass no Ai.)	Certifications
Tegomass no Ai (テゴマスのあい; "Tegomass Love"")	Released: April 21, 2010; Label: Johnny's; Formats: CD, CD/DVD	2	13	1	RIAJ: Gold

=== Singles ===
List of singles, with selected chart positions
Title	Year	Peak chart positions				Certifications	Album
Title	Year	Oricon Singles Charts	Billboard Japan Hot 100	TWN	TWN East Asian (Note: Position was taken from 2008 week 26 for "Aiai Gasa," 2009 week 29 for "Tanabata Matsuri," 2011 week 11 for "Aoi Bench," 2013 week 13 for "Sayonara ni Sayonara.")	Certifications	Album
"Miso Soup" (ミソスープ, Miso Sūpu) (Note: Preceding English release in Sweden on November 15, 2006.)	2006	1	—	—	—	RIAJ (physical): Gold	Tegomass no Uta
"Kiss (Kaerimichi no Love Song)" (キッス～帰り道のラブソング～; "Kiss (Going Home Love Song)")	2007	2	—	—	—	RIAJ (physical): Gold	Tegomass no Uta
"Ai Ai Gasa"	2008	1	1	9	2	RIAJ (physical): Gold	Tegomass no Uta
"Tanabata Matsuri" (七夕祭り; "Tanabata Festival")	2009	1	1	15	5		Tegomass no Mahō
"Aoi Bench" (Note: First time a Johnny's group released a cover as a single.)	2011	2	3	18	3	RIAJ (physical): Gold	Tegomass no Mahō
"Sayonara ni Sayonara" (サヨナラにさよなら; "Goodbye to Goodbye")	2013	2	3	—	8		Tegomass no Seishun
"Neko Chūdoku" (猫中毒; "Cat Addiction")	2013	2	2	—	—		Tegomass no Seishun
"—" denotes releases that did not chart or were not released in that region.

=== Promotional singles ===
Title	Year	Peak chart positions	Album
Title	Year	Billboard Japan Hot 100	Album
"Moshi mo, Kono Sekai kara Marumaru ga Nakunattara" (もしも、この世界から○○がなくなったら; "What If (Blank) Disappeared from This World")	2010	45	Tegomass no Ai
"Mahō no Melody" (魔法のメロディ; "Magic Melody")	2011	37	Tegomass no Mahō

=== Video albums ===
List of media, with selected chart positions
Title	Album details	Peak positions	
Title	Album details	JPN	TWN (Note: Position was taken from 2010 week 7 for Tegomass 1st Live Tour 2009, 2011 week 24 for Tegomass 2nd Live Tour 2009, 2012 week 21 for Tegomass 3rd Live Tour 2009.)
Tegomass 1st Live Tour 2009: Tegomass no Uta	Released: January 20, 2010; Label: Johnny's; Formats: DVD	1	4
Tegomass 2nd Live Tour 2009: Tegomass no Ai	Released: May 11, 2011; Label: Johnny's; Formats: DVD	2	1
Tegomass 3rd Live Tour 2009: Tegomass no Mahō	Released: April 25, 2012; Label: Johnny's; Formats: Blu-ray, DVD	1	2
"—" denotes releases that did not chart or were not released in that region.
