= Drigo =

Drigo is an Italian surname. Notable people with the surname include:

- Paola Drigo (1876–1938), Italian short story writer and novelist
- Riccardo Drigo (1846–1930), Italian composer of ballet music and Italian opera, theatrical conductor and pianist
