= Yuki Kure =

Japanese manga artist

Yuki Kure 呉 由姫
- Born: December 4 Chiba Prefecture, Japan
- Areas: Character design, writer, manga artist
- Notable works: Kin'iro no Corda
- Awards: Best Rookie – Sono Manma de Ikō; Best Newcomer – Chijō Yori Eien ni Outstanding Award – Kin'iro no Corda

Yuki Kure (呉 由姫, Kure Yuki; born December 4) is a Japanese manga artist and illustrator born in Chiba Prefecture, Japan. She is the character designer for Koei's third Neoromance series, Kin'iro no Corda.

She also authors the manga adaptation of the game, which has been serialized in Hakusensha's monthly shōjo manga magazine, LaLa, since October 2003.

== About ==
=== Personal ===
Yuki Kure was born on December 4, in Chiba Prefecture. According to an interview with Hakusensha, she previously studied the piano, which she feels is refreshing. She has stated that she wanted to play other musical instruments including the cello, bassoon and tuba.

She has mentioned that she finds it very difficult to draw Tsukimori from Kin'iro no Corda, but very easy to draw Hihara and young girls. She also likes to watch soccer matches and collect merchandise.

Reiko Shimizu, Natsumi Itsuki, Kyōko Hikawa and other LaLa manga artists are her influences when she is drawing manga.

=== Career ===
Yuki Kure made her debut winning Best Rookie in the LaLa Mangaka Scout Course for her work, Sono Manma de Ikō (そのまんまで いこう). It was later published in 2000's first issue of LaLa DX.

In 1999, she won the Outstanding Newcomers' Award in the 24th Hakusensha Athena Newcomers' Awards for her work, Chijō Yori Eien ni (地上より永遠に; Forever from the Earth). The work was later published in the March 2000 issue of LaLa.

Another work, Ashita Hajimari Koi no Tame ni (明日はじまる恋のために; For the Love that Starts Tomorrow), was published in September 2000, in LaLa DX. Two months later another work, Ever After, was published in LaLa DX.

In May 2001, Another World was published in LaLa DX. Five months later, she made her official debut in LaLa by having her work, Tobbikiri! published in the October 2001 issue.

In 2002, her work, Atashi wa Kitto Kin Iro no… (あしたはきっと金色の…) was published in LaLa's April issue. Kure went on to publish two more one-offs in LaLa DX before starting La Corda d'Oro: Kokoro Hiyori Koi Moyō (心日和恋模様) and Fast Step?. Kokoro Hiyori Koi Moyō was published in July and the latter in September.

Kure then provided the character designs for the third Neoromance series by Koei, La Corda d'Oro. In October, a month after the game's release, she began the serialization of her first series, a manga adaptation of the game.

Kure has attended signing events twice, the first of which was in 2004 in Tokyo along with other manga artists, Natsuki Takaya, Minako Narita and Banri Hidaka. The event was simultaneously held in both Tokyo and Osaka.

Her second signing event was held on March 14, 2009, at the Bunkyōdō Bookstore in Shibuya, Tokyo.

In 2014, another one of her works, titled Yūsei no Fūru (遊星のフール; The Planet of Fools) was published in LaLa's December issue, prior to which, one-shots such as Tezuka Gakuen, Nemureru Mori no Hoshi were published in Ane LaLa and LaLa respectively.

== Works ==
=== One-offs ===
- Ashita Hajimaru Koi no Tame ni (For Love Will Begin Tomorrow)
- Ever After
- Another World
- Tobbikiri! (Marvelous!)
- Ashita wa Kitto Kin Iro no… (Tomorrow It'll Be Golden...)
- Kokoro Hiyori Koi Moyō (心日和恋模様; Love's Weather Patterns)
- First Step?!
- Tezuka Gakuen
- Nemureru Mori no Hoshi (眠れる森の星; Sleeping Star)

=== Sent-in works ===
- Sono Manma de Ikō (Let's Go As We Are)
- Chijō Yori Eien ni (Forever From This World)

=== Major works ===
- Kin'iro no Corda (The Golden String)
- Yūsei no Fūru (The Planet of Fools)

=== Books ===
- Kin'iro no Corda Character Book – Published in 2007 by Hakusensha

== Awards ==
- Best Rookie in the 93rd LaLa Mangaka Scout Course (LMS) for her work which made her debut, Sono Manma de Ikō (そのまんまでいこう).
- Best Newcomer in the 24th Hakusensha Athena Newcomers' Awards for her work, Chijō Yori Eien ni.
- Outstanding Award in the 29th Hakusensha Athena Newcomers' Awards for her work, Kin'iro no Corda.
