= Hiroshi Kamiya =

Japanese voice actor and narrator (born 1975)

- 神谷 浩史
- Born: January 28, 1975 (age 51); Matsudo, Chiba, Japan
- Occupations: Voice actor; singer; narrator
- Years active: 1994–present
- Agent: Aoni Production
- Height: 167 cm (5 ft 6 in)
- Spouse: Rina Aizawa (m. 2025)
- Children: 1
- Musical career
- Also known as: Hiro-C
- Genres: J-pop; anime song
- Instrument: Vocals
- Label: Kiramune
- Member of: Hiroshi Kamiya + Daisuke Ono; Kamiyu; Masochistic Ono Band
- Website: kiramune.jp/artist/kamiya/

Hiroshi Kamiya (神谷 浩史, Kamiya Hiroshi; born January 28, 1975) is a Japanese voice actor, singer and narrator affiliated with Aoni Production.

Kamiya is known as the voice of Shinji Matō in the Fate franchise, Nozomu Itoshiki in Sayonara, Zetsubou-Sensei, Tieria Erde in Mobile Suit Gundam 00, Takashi Natsume in Natsume Yūjin Chō, Koyomi Araragi in the Monogatari series, Trafalgar Law in One Piece, Izaya Orihara in Durarara!!, Yuzuru Otonashi in Angel Beats!, Sōma in Working!!, Mephisto Pheles in Blue Exorcist, Akashi Seijuro in Kuroko's Basketball, Levi Ackerman in Attack on Titan, Juli in Brothers Conflict, Yato in Noragami, Balder Hringhorni in Kamigami no Asobi, Kinshirō Kusatsu in Cute High Earth Defense Club Love!, Kiyoshi Fujino in Prison School, Choromatsu in Mr. Osomatsu, Ranpo Edogawa in Bungo Stray Dogs, Captain Gundam in Superior Defender Gundam Force and Saiki Kusuo in The Disastrous Life of Saiki K..

He won "Best Lead Actor" and "Best Personality" at the 3rd Seiyu Awards, and "Best Supporting Actor" at the 2nd Seiyu Awards. He hosts the radio show Dear Girl: Stories with Daisuke Ono.

== Personal life ==
In July 2016, the tabloid magazine Flash published a photo of Kamiya holding a child, alleging that he had been married to manga artist Hikaru Nakamura for an undetermined amount of time. On July 17, 2016, during the 484th episode of Dear Girl: Stories, Kamiya confirmed himself in the photo but did not directly address the marriage allegations, stating that he wanted to keep his personal life private. On January 1, 2025, actress and model Rina Aizawa announced on her X account that she and Kamiya had registered their marriage.

== Discography ==
Mini albums

- Hare no Hi (ハレノヒ) (2009)
- Hareiro (ハレイロ) (2013)
- Hareyon (ハレヨン) (2014)
- Haregou (ハレゴウ) (2015)
- Hareroku (ハレロク) (2015)
- Theater (シアター) (2016)
- Toy Box (2018)
- Cue (2019)
- TP (2020)
- Brand New Way (2021)

Albums

- Harezora (ハレゾラ) (2011)
- appside (2022)

Singles

- "For Myself" (2010)
- "Nijiiro Chōchō" (虹色蝶々) (2011)
- "Such a Beautiful Affair" (2012)
- "START AGAIN" (2014)
- "Danger Heaven?" (2016)
- "Ism Rhythm" (イズムリズム) (2017)
- "Kamisama Connection" (神様コネクション)(2017)
- "Wawo!" (ワヲ！) (2023)

== Filmography ==
=== Animated series ===
Year	Title	Role	Notes	Source
1992	Kiteretsu Daihyakka	Akihiko Nonoka	second voice	
1992	Tsuyoshi Shikkari Shinasai			
1993	Aoki Densetsu Shoot!			
1994	Marmalade Boy	Ginta's Friend		
1994	Chibi Maruko-chan	Hiroshi Takeda		
1995	Captain Tsubasa J	Hanji Urabe		
1995	Magical Girl Pretty Sammy	Makoto Mizushina		
1996	Dragon Ball GT	Poberu [Pan's Date], Ronge		
1996	Slayers Next			
1996	Magical Project S			
1997	Cho Mashin Hero Wataru	Boy		
1998	Android Ana Maico 2010			
1998	DT Eightron	Ryou/ Karuno		
1998	Trigun	Zazie the Beast		
1998	Sorcerous Stabber Orphen			
1998	Yu-Gi-Oh!	Officer		
1998–99	Master Keaton	Shinsuke Funase		
1999	Corrector Yui	Takashi Fuji		
1999	Jibaku-kun	Kai		
1999	Super B-Daman			
2001	Super GALS! Kotobuki Ran	Rei Otohata		
2001	The Family's Defensive Alliance			
2001	Noir	Dominic		
2001	Beyblade	Sanguinex		
2001	Gundam Evolve	Hiden		
2001	Offside	Katsuhiko Ibino		
2002	Atashin'chi	Takada		
2002	Kanon	Kuze		
2002	Digimon Frontier	Koji Minamoto	2002 character songs: "In the Blue" and "More More Happy Christmas"	
2002	Baby Baachan	Eiki Jinguuji		
2002	Mirage of Blaze	Kojirou Date		
2002	Generation of Chaos Next	Lifile		
2002	I'll/CKBC	Hiiragi Hitonari		
2002	Mirmo Zibang	Takumi Kiryuu		
2002–08	Saint Seiya Hades: Chapter Inferno	Lyra Orphee		
2003	Ultra Maniac	Tetsushi Kaji	2003 character song: "Boku dake no..."	
2003	One Piece	Eddy	Ep. 146	
2003	L/R: Licensed by Royalty			
2003	Zatch Bell!	Eita Kobozuka		
2003	Green Green	Kenichi Hotta	Character song: "Ondō ~Sōchō Solo Ver.~"	
2003	Beyblade G-Revolution	Garland Siebald		
2003	Tank Knights Portriss	Dua Carry		
2003	Pocket Monsters Advanced Generation	Hiromi		
2003–04	Mirmo!			
2003	Sonic X	Member of team S		
2004	Agatha Christie's Great Detectives Poirot and Marple	John	Ep. 1	
2004	Superior Defender Gundam Force	Captain Gundam		
2004	Gantz	Masanobu Hojou		
2004	Kita e			
2004	Desert Punk			
2004	Tsukuyomi -Moon Phase-	Kohei Morioka		
2004	Hamtaro		Ep. 182	
2004	Phoenix			
2004	Bobobo-bo Bo-bobo	Yashinomi Man		
2004	Monkey Turn			
2004	Ring ni Kakero	Takeshi Kawai	2005 character song: "Ibara no Senritsu ~Melody~"	
2004	Rockman.EXE Stream	Narcy Hide		
2004	Burn-Up Scramble	Wonderful person		
2004	Diamond Daydreams	Minoru Jinguuji		
2004	Samurai Gun	Hebizo		
2005	The Law of Ueki	Mario		
2005	Gunparade March	Nakatoshi Iwasaki		
2005	Canvas 2: Niji Iro no Sketch			
2005	Cluster Edge	Rhodo Chrosite		
2005	Onegai My Melody	Kojirou		
2005	Damekko Dōbutsu	Peganosuke		
2005	Tsubasa: Reservoir Chronicle	Kiefer	Ep. 16	
2005–06	Honey and Clover	Yūta Takemoto		
2005	Pani Poni Dash!	Tsurugi Inugami, Lord Cat	2005 character song: "Nikukyū Bochō"	
2005	Battle B-Daman			
2005–06	Play Ball	Aiki		
2005	Iriya no Sora, UFO no Natsu	Kunihiro Suizenji		
2006	Ergo Proxy	Security Bureau employee	Ep. 2	
2006	Gakuen Heaven	Kaoru Saionji	2004 character songs: "Little Wish", "Share the Future" and "Walk Up!"	
2006–09	Sgt. Frog			
2006	Zegapain	Hayase		
2006	Crash B-Daman	Teruma Kamioka		
2006	Fate/stay night	Shinji Matō		
2006	Princess Princess	Shūya Arisada		
2006	Rockman.EXE Beast	Narcy Hide		
2006–07	The Galaxy Railways: Crossroads to Eternity	Klaus Von Meinster		
2006	Ring ni Kakero 1: Nichibei Keisen Hen	Takeshi Kawai		
2006	Fist of the Blue Sky	Peter		
2007	El Cazador de la Bruja	Okama A		
2007	Kishin Taisen Gigantic Formula	Masahito Oghuro		
2007	Sakura Taisen: New York NY.	Tutankamon		
2007–08	Mobile Suit Gundam 00	Tieria Erde	2008 character songs: "Idea" and "Elephant"	
2007	Gintama	Robot 502		
2007–08	Code-E	Adol Brinberg	second season titled Misson-E	
2007–09	Sayonara Zetsubō Sensei	Nozomu Itoshiki, Mikoto Itoshiki, Kouji Kumeta	Character songs: "Happy Nanchara" (2008), "Kurayami Shinjuu Soushisouai" (2008) and "Zesshō" (2009)	
2007	Shion no Ō	Kobayashi		
2007	Shinkyoku Sōkai Polyphonica	Phoron Tatara	2007 character song: "Way to Go"	
2007	Digimon Data Squad	Craniamon	Ep. 39–48	
2007	Deltora Quest	Sorcerer Oacus		
2007	Nodame Cantabile	Tomohito Kimura		
2007	Moonlight Mile 2nd Season -Touch Down-	Mike		
2007	Polyphonica	Tatara Phoron		
2007	Hidamari Sketch	Chokoyama		
2008	Hidamari Sketch × 365	Chokoyama		
2008	Macross Frontier	Michael Blanc		
2008	Monochrome Factor	Kengo Asamura	2008 character songs: "Awake ~Boku no Subete~" and "The World of Tomorrow"	
2008	Mission-E	Adol Brinberg		
2008–24	Natsume's Book of Friends series	Takashi Natsume	7th season in 2024; Character songs: "Atatakai Basho" (2008) and "Ayumiyoru Yuuki" (2009)	
2008	Hakushaku to Yōsei	Paul Ferman	2008 character song: "Shining Rose"	
2008	Tytania	Louis Edmond Pages		
2009–present	One Piece	Trafalgar Law	Character songs: "Dr. Heart Stealer" (2013), "Lost in Shinsekai" (2015) and "Headliners" (2017)	
2009	Polyphonica Crimson S	Phoron Tatara		
2009	Saint Seiya: The Lost Canvas	Pisces Albafica		
2009	Bakemonogatari	Koyomi Araragi		
2009	Miracle Train: ōedo-sen e Yōkoso	Riku Nakano		
2009	Kobato	Takashi Doumoto		
2010–15	Working!!	Hiroomi Sōma	Character songs: "Heart no Edge ni Idomō (Go to Heart Edge)" (2010), "Itsumo you ni Love & Peace" (2011) and "Matsuge ni Lock" (2015)	
2010	Angel Beats!	Yuzuru Otonashi		
2010	Durarara!!	Izaya Orihara	2010 character songs: "Subarashii Hibi (Wonderful Days)" and "Katte ni Shiyagare (Whatever You Like)"	
2010	Arakawa Under the Bridge	Kou Ichinomiya		
2010	Arakawa Under the Bridge x Bridge	Kou Ichinomiya		
2010	Uragiri wa Boku no Namae o Shitteiru	Kuroto Hourai		
2010	Togainu no Chi	Yukihito		
2010	Nura: Rise of the Yokai Clan	Senba		
2010	The Animal Conference on the Environment	Dr. Rabi the Rabbit		
2010	Kacho No Koi	Yukio Kumagai		
2010	Ring ni Kakero 1: Shadow	Takeshi Kawai		
2011	Ring ni Kakero 1: Sekai Taikai-hen	Takeshi Kawai		
2011	Starry Sky	Miyaji Ryunosuke	2009 character song: "Shoot High"	
2011	Yondemasuyo, Azazel-san	Beelzebub		
2011	Blue Exorcist	Mephisto Pheles		
2011	Sekai-ichi Hatsukoi	Yuu Yanase		
2011	Maji de Watashi ni Koi Shinasai!	Yamato Naoe		
2011	Dragon Crisis!	Onyx		
2011	Phi Brain: Puzzle of God	Freecell		
2011	Xi Avant	Kaoru Takamura		
2011	Gundam Age	Zeheart Galette (adult)		
2011	Carnival Phantasm	Shinji Matou		
2011	Fractale	Colin		
2012	Brave10	Unno Rokurō		
2012–15	Kuroko's Basketball	Seijūrō Akashi	2015 character songs: FINAL EMPEROR and DOUBLE CORE	
2012	Ixion Saga DT	Erecpyle Dukakis	2013 character song: "Stand Up ED"	
2012	Mobile Suit Gundam AGE	Zeheart Galette		
2012	Nekomonogatari (Kuro)	Koyomi Araragi		
2012	Nisemonogatari	Koyomi Araragi		
2012–13	Saint Seiya Omega	Andromeda Shun		
2012	Shining Hearts: Shiawase no Pan	Rick, Alvin		
2012–13	Shirokuma Café	Penguin		
2012	Medaka Box Abnormal	Kei Munakata		
2012	Busou Shinki	Jindo		
2013	Hakkenden: Tōhō Hakken Ibun	Riō Satomi		
2013	Karneval	Gareki	2013 character song: "Reach for the sky"	
2013	Monogatari Series Second Season	Koyomi Araragi		
2013	Maoyu	Young Merchant		
2013	Senyu	Teufel Diabolos		
2013	Devil Survivor 2: The Animation	Hibiki Kuze		
2013	Brothers Conflict	Juli		
2013–23	Attack on Titan	Levi Ackerman	4th season in 2021; 2017 character song: "Dark Side Of The Moon"	
2013	Attack On Titan - Ilse's Notebook	Levi Ackerman		
2013	Yondemasu yo, Azazel-san Z	Beelzebub		
2013	Otona Joshi No Anime Time (Jinsei Best 10)	Kishida Yuusaka		
2013	Makai Ōji: Devils and Realist	Michael		
2013	Galilei Donna	Cicinho		
2013	Phi Brain: Puzzle of God 3	Freecell		
2013	Lupin III: Princess of the breeze ~Kakusareta Kūchū Toshi~	Shion		
2014	Hamatora	Art		
2014	Re: Hamatora	Art		
2014	Noragami	Yato	Character song: "Tsukiyo no Fune"	
2014	Haikyū!!	Ittetsu Takeda		
2014	Kamigami no Asobi	Baldr Hringhorni	2013 character song: "I Bless You"	
2014	Captain Earth	Arashi Teppei		
2014	Broken Blade	Zess		
2014	Wooser's Hand-to-Mouth Life	Darth Wooser		
2014	Hero Bank	Nagare Amano		
2014	Ace of Diamond	Shunpei Sanada		
2014	Fate/stay night: Unlimited Blade Works	Shinji Matō		
2014	Space Dandy	Johnny	Ep. 20	
2014	Sword Art Online II	Zexceed/Shigemura Tamotsu		
2014	Zephyr	Kal		
2014	The Seven Deadly Sins	Helbram (fairy form)		
2014	Tsukimonogatari	Koyomi Araragi		
2014	Attack on Titan: No Regrets	Levi Ackerman		
2015	Attack on Titan: Junior High	Levi Ackerman		
2015	Durarara!!x2	Izaya Orihara		
2015	Cute High Earth Defense Club Love!	Kinshirō Kusatsu	2015 character song: "Never Know"	
2015	Ultimate Otaku Teacher	Junichirō Kagami		
2015	Saint Seiya: Soul of Gold	Garmr Útgarðar		
2015	Prison School	Kiyoshi Fujino		
2015	Noragami Aragoto	Yato		
2015	Owarimonogatari	Koyomi Araragi, Seishirō Shishirui		
2015	Mr. Osomatsu	Choromatsu Matsuno	2nd and 3rd season in 2017 & 2020	
2015	Seiyu's Life!	Hiroshi Kamiya (as himself)		
2016	Bungo Stray Dogs	Edogawa Ranpo	2nd season in 2019; 2016 character song: "Labyrinth Deciphering Game"	
2016	Crayon Shin-chan	Buriburizaemon		
2016	The Disastrous Life of Saiki K.	Kusuo Saiki	2nd season and Reawakened in 2018 & 2019	
2016	Servamp	Tsurugi Kamiya		
2016	The Great Passage	Masashi Nishioka		
2017	Blue Exorcist: Kyoto Impure King Arc	Mephisto Pheles		
2017	ēlDLIVE	Vega Victor		
2017	Convenience Store Boy Friends	Asumi Natsu		
2017	Owarimonogatari 2nd Season	Koyomi Araragi		
2017	Children of the Whales	Shuan		
2017	ROAD TO YOU: Kimi e to Tsuzuku Michi	Ryouta		
2018	Devils' Line	Takeshi Makimura		
2018	The Seven Deadly Sins: Revival of the Commandments	Helbram		
2018	Beatless	Ginga Watarai	Ep 7	
2018	The Legend of the Galactic Heroes: Die Neue These	Andrew Falk	Ep 10–11	
2018	Boarding School Juliet	Scott Fold		
2018	Overlord III	Kyouhukou		
2018	Inazuma Eleven: Ares	Haizaki Ryouhei		
2018	Inazuma Eleven: Orion no Kokuin	Haizaki Ryouhei		
2018–20	Muhyo & Roji's Bureau of Supernatural Investigation	Soratsugu Madoka		
2019	Ace of Diamond Act II	Shunpei Sanada		
2019	Carole & Tuesday	Tao		
2019	African Office Worker	Caracal		
2019	GeGeGe no Kitarō	Rei Isurugi		
2020	Kakushigoto	Kakushi Gotō		
2020	The Gymnastics Samurai	Ryū Ryūshō		
2021	Skate-Leading Stars	Reo Shinozaki		
2021	Bungo Stray Dogs Wan!	Edogawa Ranpo		
2021	SSSS.Dynazenon	Jyuga		
2021	Backflip!!	Kōtarō Watari		
2021	Fruits Basket: The Final	God		
2021	The Duke of Death and His Maid	Zain		
2021	Life Lessons with Uramichi Oniisan	Uramichi Omota		
2021	Pokémon Journeys: The Series	Tsurugi		
2021	Bonobono	Rosshi		
2021	Tesla Note	Oliver Thornton		
2021	Sakugan	DJK		
2022	Kaginado Season 2	Yuzuru Otonashi		
2022	The Yakuza's Guide to Babysitting	Yuri Mashiro		
2022	Blue Lock	Jinpachi Ego		
2022	Urusei Yatsura	Ataru Moroboshi		
2023	MF Ghost	Michael Beckenbauer		
2024	Kinnikuman: Perfect Origin Arc	Ashuraman		
2024	No Longer Allowed in Another World	Sensei		
2024	My Hero Academia Season 7	Zen Shigaraki (young)		
2024	Yakuza Fiancé: Raise wa Tanin ga Ii	Azami Suo		
2025	Tougen Anki	Naito Mudano		
2025	Go! Go! Loser Ranger! Season 2	Yakushi Usukubo		
2025	Wind Breaker	Chika Takiishi		
2025	My Hero Academia: Final Season	Zen Shigaraki (young)		
2026	Digimon Beatbreak	Genjo Kanada		
2026	The Warrior Princess and the Barbaric King	Shidius		
2026	Mission: Yozakura Family	Kai Izumo		
2027	Shōzen	Dōzen		

=== Anime films ===
Year	Title	Role	Notes
2002	Digimon Frontier: Ancient Digimon Revival	Koji Minamoto	
2005	Garasu no Usagi	Tsuneo Ei	
2008	Bleach: Fade to Black	Shizuku	
2008	Saraba Kamen Rider Den-O: Final Countdown	Ghost Imagin, Kamen Rider Yuuki Skull Form	
2010	Broken Blade	Zess	
2010	Ultraman Zero: The Revenge of Belial	Jean-bot	
2010	Mobile Suit Gundam 00 the Movie: Awakening of the Trailblazer	Tieria Erde	
2010	Inazuma Eleven the Movie: The Invasion of the Strongest Army Corps Ogre	Baddap Sleed	
2011	Towa no Quon	Quon	
2012	Blue Exorcist: The Movie	Mephisto Pheles	
2012	Blood-C: The Last Dark	Kuroto Mogari	
2014	Heisei Riders vs. Shōwa Riders: Kamen Rider Taisen feat. Super Sentai	Kamen Rider 2, Kamen Rider Super-1, Kamen Rider Black, Kamen Rider Kabuto	
2014	Expelled from Paradise	Frontier Setter	
2015	Psycho-Pass: The Movie	Nicholas Wong	
2016	Zutto Mae Kara Suki Deshita	Yū Setoguchi	
2016	Suki ni Naru Sono Shunkan o	Yū Setoguchi	
2016	Doukyuusei	Hikaru Kusakabe	
2016	Kizumonogatari Part 1: Tekketsu	Koyomi Araragi	
2016	Kizumonogatari Part 2: Nekketsu	Koyomi Araragi	
2017	Kizumonogatari Part 3: Reiketsu	Koyomi Araragi	
2017	Kuroko's Basketball The Movie: Last Game	Seijūrō Akashi	
2017	The Night Is Short, Walk on Girl	The School Festival Executive Head	
2018	Bungo Stray Dogs: Dead Apple	Ranpo Edogawa	
2018	Natsume's Book of Friends the Movie: Tied to the Temporal World	Takashi Natsume	
2018	Zoku Owarimonogatari	Koyomi Araragi	
2019	Mr. Osomatsu: The Movie	Choromatsu Matsuno	
2019	One Piece: Stampede	Trafalgar D. Water Law	
2019	Pokémon: Mewtwo Strikes Back—Evolution	Corey	
2020	Crayon Shin-chan: Crash! Graffiti Kingdom and Almost Four Heroes	Buriburizaemon	
2021	Natsume's Book of Friends: The Waking Rock and the Strange Visitor	Takashi Natsume	
2021	Words Bubble Up Like Soda Pop	Kōichi	
2021	The Journey	Zurara	
2022	Dragon Ball Super: Super Hero	Gamma #1	
2022	Mr. Osomatsu: Hipipo-Zoku to Kagayaku Kajitsu	Choromatsu Matsuno	
2022	Backflip!!	Kōtarō Watari	
2022	One Piece Film: Red	Trafalgar D. Water Law	
2023	Gold Kingdom and Water Kingdom	Saladin	
2024	Haikyu!! The Dumpster Battle	Ittetsu Takeda	
2024	Blue Lock: Episode Nagi	Jinpachi Ego	
2024	Mononoke the Movie: Phantom in the Rain	Medicine Seller	
2025	Mononoke the Movie: The Ashes of Rage	Medicine Seller	
2025	Cute High Earth Defense Club Eternal Love!	Kinshirō Kusatsu	
2026	Mononoke the Movie: The Curse of the Serpent	Medicine Seller	
2027	Ghost	Itō	

=== Live-action films ===
Year	Title	Role	Notes
2019	Chō Shōnen Tanteidan NEO: Beginning	The Fiend with Twenty Faces (voice)	

=== Tokusatsu ===
Year	Title	Role	Notes
1999	Booska! Booska!!	Refrigerator	Ep. 8
2001	Ultraman Gaia: Gaia Again	PAL	OV
2005	Kamen Rider The First	Radio DJ	Movie
2008	Saraba Kamen Rider Den-O: Final Countdown	Ghost Imagin/G-Ryotaro/Kamen Rider Yuuki Skull Form	Movie
2010	Ultraman Zero The Movie: Super Deciding Fight! The Belial Galactic Empire	Jean-bird/Jean-bot	Movie
2011	Ultraman Zero Side Story: Killer the Beatstar	Jean-bot	OV
2013	Ultra Zero Fight Season 2	Jean-bot	
2014	Heisei Rider vs. Shōwa Rider: Kamen Rider Taisen feat. Super Sentai	Kamen Rider 2, Kamen Rider Super-1, Kamen Rider Black, Kamen Rider Kabuto,	Movie
2017	Uchu Sentai Kyuranger	Shou Ronpo/Ryu Violet/Ryu Commander, Dragon	Eps. 3 – 48 Shou Ronpo, Ep. 9 Dragon
2017	Kamen Rider × Super Sentai: Ultra Super Hero Taisen	Shou Ronpo	Movie
2017	Uchu Sentai Kyuranger the Movie: Gase Indaver Strikes Back	Shou Ronpo/Ryu Commander	Movie
2021–2023	Mashin Sentai Kiramager Spin-Off: Yodonna	Mose	3 episode web-special (Yodonna, Yodonna 2, Yodonna 3: Yodonna's Valentine)
2022	Kamen Rider Revice	Himself	Ep 30, on-screen appearance
2024	Bakuage Sentai Boonboomger	Madrex	

=== Video games ===
Year	Title	Role	Notes
1997	Klonoa		
1997	Minna no Golf Portable		
1997	Langrisser IV	McClaine	
1998	Langrisser V: The End of Legend	McClaine	
1998	Dokidoki Pretty League		
1998	Sentimental Graffiti		
1999	Black/Matrix AD (Advanced)	Abel	
1999	Favorite Dear	Ryudrall Allgreen	1999 character song: "Mirai no Tameni"
1999	Kanon		
2000	Gunparade March		
2001	Final Fantasy X	Gatta, other minor characters	
2001	Green Green		
2002	Hoshi no Mahoroba		
2002	Black/Matrix II	Reiji	
2002	Xenosaga Episode I	Canaan	
2002	Generation of Chaos Next		
2003	Castlevania: Lament of Innocence	Joachim Armster	
2003	Shirotsu Mesōwa: Episode of the Clovers		
2003	Venus & Braves		
2004	Xenosaga Episode II	Canaan	
2004	Black/Matrix 00		
2004	Kessen III	Azai Nagamasa	
2004	Gakuen Heaven Boy's Love Scramble! Type B		
2005	Gakuen Heaven Okawari!		
2005	The Robot Tsukurōse!		
2005	Togainu no Chi	Yukihito	
2006	Valkyrie Profile 2: Silmeria	Dallas, Kraad, Roland, Seluvia, Xehnon and Masato	
2006	Xenosaga Episode III	Canaan	
2006	.hack//G.U.	Arena Commentator	
2006	Moshimo Ashita ga Hare Naraba	Kazuki Hatoba	
2006	Samurai Warriors 2	Azai Nagamasa	
2007	Warriors Orochi	Azai Nagamasa	
2007	Dear My Sun!!		2008 character song: "Metamorphose"
2007	Fate/stay night Réalta Nua	Shinji Matō	
2007	Fate/tiger colosseum	Shinji Matō	
2007	Operation Darkness		
2007	Panic Palette		
2007	Shining Force EXA	Phillip	
2007	Shining Wind	Shumari	
2007	Gundam MS Sensen 0079		
2008	Hoshi Sora no Comic Garden		
2008	Warriors Orochi 2	Azai Nagamasa	
2008	Drastic Killer		
2008	Macross Ace Frontier	Michael Blanc	
2008	Mobile Suit Gundam 00	Tieria Erde	
2008	Mobile Suit Gundam 00: Gundam Meisters	Tieria Erde	
2008	Monochrome Factor Cross Road	Kengo Asamura	
2008	Piyotan: Housekeeper wa Cute na Tantei		
2008	Poison Pink	Orifen	
2008	Panic Palette Portable		
2008	Real Rode		
2008	Starry Sky	Ryunosuke Miyaji	
2008	Tales of Hearts	Chalcedony Arcome	
2008	Tales of Hearts R	Chalcedony Arcome	
2008	Castlevania Judgment	Aeon	
2009	Dear Girl: Stories Hibiki - Hibiki Tokkun Daisakusen!		
2009	Steal!	Kiryu Takayuki	
2009	Street Gears	Rookie	
2009	VitaminZ	Ruriya Tendo	
2009	Samurai Warriors 3	Nagamasa Azai	2010 character song: "Tokoshie Ni Saku Hana (A Flower That Blooms Eternally)"
2010	Valkyria Chronicles II	Zeri	
2010	Fate/Extra	Shinji Matō	
2010	Last Ranker	Zig	
2010	Shining Hearts	Rick	
2011	Final Fantasy Type-0	Machina Kunagiri	
2011	Final Promise Story	Wolf	
2011	Warriors Orochi 3	Azai Nagamasa	
2011	Black Rock Shooter: The Game	LLWO/Ririo	
2011	Super Robot Wars Z2: Destruction Chapter	Tieria Erde, Mikhail "Michel" Blanc	
2012	Super Robot Wars Z2: Rebirth Chapter	Tieria Erde, Mikhail "Michel" Blanc	
2012	Brothers Conflict: Passion Pink	Juli	
2012	Pokémon	N	Black 2 White 2 Animated Trailer
2012	Saint Seiya Omega: Ultimate Cosmo	Andromeda Shun	
2012	Kuroko's Basketball Game of Miracles	Akashi Seijūrō	
2012	Tokyo Babel	Setsuna Tendō	
2012	Super Robot Taisen OG Saga: Masou Kishin II Revelation of Evil God	Eran Xenosakis	
2012	Shining Blade	Rick	
2012	Genso Suikoden: Tsumugareshi Hyakunen no Toki	Protagonist	
2013	Kamigami no Asobi: Ludere Deorum	Balder Hringhorni	
2013	Shining Ark	Fried Karim	
2013	JoJo's Bizarre Adventure: All Star Battle	Rohan Kishibe	
2014	Shining Resonance Refrain	Jinas	
2014	Granblue Fantasy	Levi	Collaboration event
2014	Super Robot Wars Z3: Hell Chapter	Tieria Erde, Mikhail "Michel" Blanc	
2015	Super Robot Wars Z3: Heaven Chapter	Tieria Erde, Mikhail "Michel" Blanc	
2015	Gum Kare!	Tieria Erde, Mikhail "Michel" Blanc	Cool Ibuki
2015	JoJo's Bizarre Adventure: Eyes of Heaven	Rohan Kishibe	
2015	Final Fantasy Type-0 HD	Machina Kunagiri	
2015	Dragon Quest: Heroes	Terry	
2016	Dragon Quest Heroes II	Terry	
2016	Shin Megami Tensei IV	Jonathan, Kiyoharu	
2017	Super Robot Wars V	Tieria Erde	
2017	Fire Emblem Echoes: Shadows of Valentia	Clive	
2018	Warriors Orochi 4	Azai Nagamasa	
2018	Identity V	Joseph Desaulniers	
2020	Genshin Impact	Neuvillette	
2021	Onmyoji	Taishakuten	
2022	Dragon Quest Treasures	Admiral Mogsworth, Monsters	
2024	Granblue Fantasy: Relink	Rolan	
2027	Fate/Extra Record	Shinji Matō	

=== Drama CDs ===
Year	Title	Role	Notes
2006	Ai de Kitsuku Shibaritai ~Koi Yori Hageshiku~	Ushio Igarashi	
2007	Me & My Brothers	Takashi Miyashita	
2007	Hakushaku to Yōsei	Paul Ferman	
2007	Natsume Yūjin Chō	Takashi Natsume	
2008	Hana to Akuma	Vivi	
2008	Mobile Suit Gundam 00 Another Story: Mission-2306	Tieria Erde	
2008	Mobile Suit Gundam 00 Another Story: Road to 2307	Tieria Erde	
2008	Shitsuji-sama no Okiniiri	Iori Douke	
2009	Barajou No Kiss	Mitsuru Tenjou	
2009	Kiss x Kiss vol 09: Tsundere Kiss	Togari Sakuya	
2009	S.L.H Stray Love Hearts!	Minemitsu Yamashina	
2009	Shin Megami Tensei: Devil Survivor	Naoya	
2010	I Love Pet!	Lop Ear - Sora	Vol. 4
2010	Karneval	Gareki	
2011	Mousou Kareshi (Pet) Series: Do M na Petto-kun	Makoto	
2014	Attack On Titan Cleaning Battle	Levi	
2014	Shirokuma Cafe	Penguin	
2014	Watashi ga Motete Dousunda	Hayato Shinomiya	

=== Boys love CDs ===
Year	Title	Role	Notes
1999	Eden wo Toukuhanarete 2 -Ryokuin no Rakuen-		
2001	Eden wo Toukuhanarete 3 -Setsunai Yoru no Rakuen-	Tadanao Takahashi	
2002	Gakuen Heaven: Mirai wa Kimi no Mono	Kaoru Saionji	
2003	Shounen Yonkei		
2004	Kachou no Koi	Yukio Kumagai	
2004	Kawaii Hito	Tomohiro Ikeuchi	
2004	Migatte na Karyuudo	Satoshi Takase	
2004	Milk Crown no Tameiki	Mitsuru Uchikawa	
2004	Osana na Jimi	Mitsuo Izawa	
2004	Gakuen Heaven: Tsuyokina Ninensei	Kaoru Saionji	
2004	Gakuen Heaven: Welcome to Heaven!	Kaoru Saionji	
2005	Gakuen Heaven: Happy Paradise	Kaoru Saionji	
2005	Slavers Series 2: Slaver's Lover Zenpen	Yoshihiro Hayase	
2005	Slavers Series 3: Slaver's Lover Kouhen	Yoshihiro Hayase	
2005	Slavers Series 4: Freezing Eye	Yoshihiro Hayase	
2005	Koi dorobou o Sagase!	Mikari Kasugano	
2005	Renai Kyotei Nukegake Nashi!	Igarashi Masami	
2005	Seikanji Series Vol. 1. Kono Tsumibukaki Yoru ni		
2005	Egoist no Junai	Yukihito Hanamoto	
2005	Sono Yubi Dake ga Shitte Iru 2: Hidarite wa Kare no Yume o Miru	Masanobu Asaka	
2005	N Dai Fuzoku Byōin Series 2	Masahiko Sudo	
2005	S	Masaki Shiiba	
2006	S - Kamiato -	Masaki Shiiba	
2006	Kakehiki no Recipe	Masato Aihara	
2006	Kishidou Club	Yuuki Sawamura	
2006	Saihate no Kimi e	Masaya	
2006	Seikanji Series Vol. 2. Yogoto Mitsu wa Shitatarite	Fuyuki Seikanji	
2006	Sex Pistols 3	Shima	
2006	Sono Yubi Dake ga Shitte Iru 3: Kusuri Yubi wa Chinmoku Suru	Masanobu Asaka	
2006	VIP	Kazutaka Yugi	
2006	VIP: Toge	Kazutaka Yugi	
2006	Abareru Inu	Yuuji Tanimoto	
2006	Ai de Kitsuku Shibaritai: Koi Yori Hageshiku	Ushio Igarashi	
2006	Shinayakana Netsujou Series 1. Shinayakana Netsujou	Omi Koyama	
2006	Shinayakana Netsujou Series 3. Azayakana Renjo	Omi Koyama	
2007	Shinayakana Netsujou Series 1.5 Sarasara	Omi Koyama	
2007	Shinayakana Netsujou Bangaihen - Papillon de Chocolat		
2007	Koi ni Inochi o Kakeru no sa	Seiji Shinkai	
2007	Ai to Jingi ni Ikiru no sa	Seiji Shinkai	
2007	Renai Sousa 1 & 2	Kousuke Shiki	
2007	S - Rekka -	Masaki Shiiba	
2007	S - Zankou -	Masaki Shiiba	
2007	Seikanji Series vol. 3. Setsunasa wa Yoru no Biyaku		
2007	Sokubaku no Aria	Shiki Fujimoto	
2007	Utsukushii Hito	Riku Kotani	
2007	Isso mou, Kudokitai!	Mikuni	
2007	Mimi o Sumaseba Kasukana Umi	Shoi Oosawa	
2008	Seikanji Series Vol. 4. Tsumi no Shitone mo Nureru Yoru	Fuyuki Seikanji	
2008	Shinayakana Netsujou Series 4. Yasuraka na Yoru no tame no Guwa	Omi Koyama	
2008	Shinayakana Netsujou Series 2. Himeya ka na Junjo	Omi Koyama	
2008	Reload	Satoshi Jingu	
2008	Sekai-ichi Hatsukoi 1: Onodera Ritsu no Baai + Yoshino Chiaki no Baai	Yuu Yanase	
2008	Sekai-ichi Hatsukoi 2: Yoshino Chiaki no Baai + Onodera Ritsu no Baai	Yuu Yanase	
2008	Sentimental Garden Lover	Hiro	
2008	Unison	Shuiichi Nagase	
2008	VIP: Kowaku	Kazutaka Yugi	
2008	Benriya-san	Aki Kirigaya	
2008	Kodomo no Hitomi	Misaki Kashiwabara	
2008	Koi no Shizuku	Hajime Kikusui	
2008	Kotonoha no Hana Series 1: Kotonoha no hana	Kazuaki Yomura	
2008	Missing Road: Sekai wo Koete Kimi o Yobu	Alandis	
2008	Pretty Babies 1	Kanata Fujino	
2008	Subete wa Kono Yoru ni	Satoru Kaji	
2009	Zabuton		
2009	Ai Kamoshirenai: Yamada Yugi Bamboo Selection CD 2	Yanagi	
2009	Hanaōgi: Zabuton 2		
2009	Hitorijime Theory	Wakamiya	
2009	Kannou Shousetsuka wo Choukyou-chuu♡	Wakaba Miyano	
2009	Kuroi Ryuu wa Nido Chikau	Rashuri	
2009	Sanbyaku nen no Koi no Hate	Kon	
2009	Sekai-ichi Hatsukoi 3: Onodera Ritsu no Baai + Yoshino Chiaki no Baai	Yuu Yanase	
2009	Steal! Shokai Tokuten	Takayuki Kiryuu	
2009	Rakuen no Uta 1	Nachi Sasamoto	
2010	Rakuen no Uta 2	Nachi Sasamoto	
2010	Kannou Shousetsuka wa Hatsujou-chuu♡	Wakaba Miyano	
2010	Seikanji Series Vol. 6. Owari Naki Yorunohate		
2010	Sekai-ichi Hatsukoi 4: Yoshino Chiaki no Baai + Onodera Ritsu no Baai	Yuu Yanase	
2010	Shinayakana Netsujou Series 5. Hanayakana Aijo	Omi Koyama	
2010	Sotsugyousei	Hikaru Kusakabe	
2010	Kowakare: Zabuton 3		
2010	Steal! Series 1: 1st Mission	Takayuki Kiryuu	
2010	Steal! Series 2: 2nd Mission	Takayuki Kiryuu	
2011	Steal! Series 3 part 1: Koisuru Valentine	Takayuki Kiryuu	
2011	Steal! Series 3 part 2: Aisare White Day	Takayuki Kiryuu	
2011	Super Lovers	Kaidou Ren	
2011	Kotonoha no Hana Series 2: Kotonoha no sekai	Kazuyo Akimura (fortune-teller)	
2011	Kotonoha no Hana Series 1.5: Kotonoha Biyori	Kazuaki Yomura	
2011	Pretty Babies 2	Kanata Fujino	
2012	Ouji-sama Lv 2		
2012	Shinayakana Netsujou Series 6. Taoyakana Shinjo	Omi Koyama	
2012	Sora to Hara	Hikaru Kusakabe	
2013	Kamisama no Ude no Naka	Ginger	
2013–2014	Kayashima shi no Yuugana Seikatsu	Koizumi	
2015	O.B.	Hikaru Kusakabe	
2021	blanc	Hikaru Kusakabe	
2021	Doukyusei	Hikaru Kusakabe	

=== Dubbing ===
==== Live-action ====
Original Year	Title	Role	Original actor	Notes
1960	The Apartment	C. C. Baxter	Jack Lemmon	2025 BS10 Star Channel edition
1996	2 Days in the Valley	Allan Hopper	Greg Cruttwell	
2009–2010	Aaron Stone	S.T.A.N.	J. P. Manoux	
2012	The Hunger Games	Peeta Mellark	Josh Hutcherson	
2013	The Hunger Games: Catching Fire	Peeta Mellark	Josh Hutcherson	
2013	Journey to the West: Conquering the Demons	Prince Important	Show Lo	
2013	Pee Mak	Aey	Kantapat Permpoonpatcharasuk	
2014	The Hunger Games: Mockingjay – Part 1	Peeta Mellark	Josh Hutcherson	
2015	The Hunger Games: Mockingjay – Part 2	Peeta Mellark	Josh Hutcherson	
2015	Shark Lake	Peter Mayes	Michael Aaron Milligan	
2016	Batman v Superman: Dawn of Justice	Lex Luthor	Jesse Eisenberg	
2017	Justice League	Lex Luthor	Jesse Eisenberg	
2017	Flatliners	Ray	Diego Luna	
2017–2019	Below the Surface	Philip Nørgaard	Johannes Lassen	
2018	Genius	Young Pablo Picasso	Alex Rich	
2019	Killing Eve	Aaron Peel	Henry Lloyd-Hughes	
2019	Running Wild with Bear Grylls	Bobby Bones		
2019	Alita: Battle Angel	Zapan	Ed Skrein	
2019	It Chapter Two	Adult Eddie Kaspbrak	James Ransone	
2021	Detective Chinatown 3	Qin Feng	Liu Haoran	
2021	F4 Thailand: Boys Over Flowers	Kavin Taemiyaklin Kittiyangkul	Metawin Opas-iamkajorn	
2021	F9	Otto	Thue Ersted Rasmussen	
2021	Zack Snyder's Justice League	Lex Luthor	Jesse Eisenberg	
2023	Rebel Moon	Admiral Atticus Noble	Ed Skrein	
2023	Dungeons & Dragons: Honor Among Thieves	Talking corpse		
2024	IF	Guardian Dog	Sam Rockwell	
2024-present	Ted	Ted	Seth MacFarlane	
2025	How to Train Your Dragon	Tuffnut Thorston	Harry Trevaldwyn	
2026	Masters of the Universe	Orko	Christopher Ragland	

==== Animation ====
Original Year	Title	Role	Original actor	Notes
2000–2003	Clifford the Big Red Dog	T-Bone	Nick Jameson	
2026	Toy Story 5			Cameo

== Live performances ==
Year	Title	Notes
2009	Kiramune Music Festival	
2010	Kiramune Music Festival	
2010	KAmiYU in Wonderland	
2011	DGS 4 Lovers Only	
2011	KAmiYU in Wonderland 2	
2012	Kiramune Music Festival	
2013	DGS Festival Carnival Matsuri	
2013	Kiramune Music Festival	
2013	DGS Dear Boy Matsuri	
2014	KAmiYU in Wonderland 3	
2014	Kiramune Music Festival	
2015	Kiramune Music Festival	
2015	Hiroshi Kamiya ~First Live~ Hareyon	
2016	Kiramune Music Festival	
2016	DGS EXPO 2016	
2016	Hiroshi Kamiya Live 2016 "LIVE THEATER"	
2017	Kiramune Music Festival	
2018	Kiramune Music Festival	
2018	KAmiYU in Wonderland 4	
2018	DGS vs MOB Live Survive	
2019	Kiramune Music Festival 10TH Anniversary	
2020	MASOCHISTIC ONO BAND LIVE TOUR	
2021	Hiroshi Kamiya LIVE TOUR "SUNNY BOX"	
2022	DGS Festival Carnival 15TH Anniversary	
2023	Kiramune Music Festival	
2023	Hiroshi Kamiya LIVE TOUR "WAO!"	
2024	MASOCHISTIC ONO BAND 10th Anniversary Gasoline Meeting	
2024	Kiramune Music Festival	
