= Daisuke Ono =

Japanese voice actor (born 1978)

- 小野 大輔
- Born: May 4, 1978 (age 48); Sakawa, Takaoka District, Kōchi Prefecture, Japan
- Education: Nihon University
- Occupations: Voice actor; singer
- Years active: 2001–present
- Height: 175 cm (5 ft 9 in)
- Musical career
- Also known as: Ono-D
- Genres: J-pop; anime song
- Instrument: Vocals
- Label: Lantis
- Member of: Masochistic Ono Band
- Website: daisukeono.com

Daisuke Ono (小野 大輔, Ono Daisuke; born May 4, 1978) is a Japanese voice actor and singer who won the 4th and 9th Seiyu Awards for best lead actor for his role as Sebastian Michaelis in Black Butler, Jotaro Kujo in JoJo's Bizarre Adventure and Shukuro Tsukishima in Bleach, as well as "Best Personalities" at the 9th Seiyu Awards. Other notable roles include Erwin Smith in Attack on Titan, Itsuki Koizumi in The Melancholy of Haruhi Suzumiya, Seishū Handa in Barakamon, Silver the Hedgehog in Sonic the Hedgehog, Drole in The Seven Deadly Sins, Shizuo Heiwajima in Durarara!!, Jyushimatsu in Osomatsu-san, Shintarō Midorima in Kuroko's Basketball, Subaru Asahina in Brothers Conflict, Hades Aidoneus in Kamigami no Asobi, Killer T Cell in Cells at Work! and Battler Ushiromiya in Umineko When They Cry and Nobuyuki Sanada in Samurai Warriors 4 and Warriors Orochi 4, Jing Yuan in Honkai: Star Rail, and Wriothesley in Genshin Impact. Ono was also featured in The King of Fighters 2002 Unlimited Match as Nameless and the announcer of the game. He hosts radio show Dear Girl: Stories along with voice actor Hiroshi Kamiya.

== Biography ==
Ono graduated from Kōchi High School, Nihon University College of Art (Department of Broadcasting), and Aoni Coaching School Sunday Class. At university, he initially studied TV show production, but failed to succeed in directing a large group of people. Later, he switched to radio production, and during the creation of a radio drama, became a performer due to a shortage of staff, which led him to pursue voice acting. In 2007, he started his music career under his own name with the mini-album Hinemosu. Since 2008, he has been performing at the "Original Entertainment Paradise" held at the end of every year as one of the hosts and the leader. The other hosts are Showtaro Morikubo, Kenichi Suzumura, and Takuma Terashima.

In 2008, he won the 2nd Seiyu Award for Best Actor in a Supporting Role and won the 4th award in 2010. In 2011, he won the Grand Prix at the 33rd Animage Anime Grand Prix in the voice acting category.

In 2015, Ono won the 9th Seiyu Award for Best Actor in a Leading Role and Personality, the BEST COMFORT RADIO Healing Radio Award for the TV anime Barakamon's web radio Radikamon, which he was a personality for at the 1st Aniradi Awards, and the Voice Actor Award at the Tokyo Anime Award Festival 2015, Anime of the Year Category.

In February 2016, Ono left Mausu Promotion, to which he belonged for many years, and started his freelance career.

== Filmography ==
=== Animated series ===
| Year | Title | Role | Notes | Ref. |
|---|---|---|---|---|
| 2002 | G-On Riders, | Announcer, Official | | |
| 2002 | Heat Guy J | Driver, Man, Man B, Soldier A | | |
| 2003 | Ashita no Nadja | Massimo | | |
| 2003 | D.C. ~Da Capo~ | Kuri Rix | | |
| 2003 | Full Metal Panic? Fumoffu | Kobayashi, Sakamoto | | |
| 2003 | Godannar | Staff Member A | | |
| 2003 | Kimi ga Nozomu Eien | Male | | |
| 2003 | Mermaid Melody: Pichi Pichi Pitch | Employee A | | |
| 2003 | Please Twins! | Flirting Man, Man | | |
| 2003 | R.O.D -The TV- | Editor-in-Chief | | |
| 2003 | Rockman.EXE Axess | Prisman | | |
| 2003 | Saiyuki Reload | Demon | | |
| 2003 | Scrapped Princess | Kidaf | | |
| 2003 | Tsukihime | Announcer, Classmate A, Clerk, Corpse | | |
| 2003 | Wolf's Rain | Retriever B | | |
| 2004 | Agatha Christie no Meitantei Poirot to Marple | Harold Crackenthorpe | | |
| 2004 | Burst Angel, | Surfer | | |
| 2004 | Daphne in the Brilliant Blue | Chinpira, Control Official, Ramen Shop Owner, Rent Non-payer, Testing Official | | |
| 2004 | Elfen Lied | Kouta's Father | | |
| 2004 | Futakoi | Gonda | | |
| 2004 | Gakuen Alice | Doctor, Man A, Old Man, Reo's subordinate A, Wild Animal Tamer | | |
| 2004 | Genshiken | Otaku A, Student Council Chairman | | |
| 2004 | Midori Days | Qi Gong Masters | | |
| 2004 | Ninja Nonsense | Ninja 2 | | |
| 2004 | Rockman.EXE Stream | Ken | | |
| 2004 | Saiyuki Gunlock | Bozu, Demon | | |
| 2004 | Samurai 7 | Kamuro A | | |
| 2004 | ToHeart Remember my memories | Referee | | |
| 2004 | Uta∽Kata | Ryō, Tourist | | |
| 2004 | Yakitate!! Japan | Examinee, Guard #2 | | |
| 2004 | Zatch Bell! | Gofure | | |
| 2005 | Air | Yukito Kunisaki | | |
| 2005 | Best Student Council | Yuuichi Kimizuka | | |
| 2005 | Blood+ | Sorimachi | | |
| 2005 | Eyeshield 21 | Kengo Mizumachi | | |
| 2005 | Full Metal Panic! The Second Raid | Shota Sakamoto | | |
| 2005 | Fushigiboshi no Futago Hime | Aaron | | |
| 2005 | Ginga Densetsu Weed | Kite | | |
| 2005 | Glass Mask | Hiro Kasari | | |
| 2005 | Hell Girl | Masaya Kataoka | | |
| 2005 | Honey and Clover | Male Student B, Male Student C, Matsuda Ichiro, Narrator, Student B, Toast Master | | |
| 2005 | Karin | Interviewer | | |
| 2005 | Noein - to your other self | Enra | | |
| 2005 | Rozen Maiden: Träumend | Enju | | |
| 2005 | Starship Operators | Gotou | | |
| 2005 | Trinity Blood | Guy, Count of Brugges | | |
| 2005 | Yakitate!! Japan | Examinee, Guard #2 | | |
| 2006 | Ballad of a Shinigami | Matsumoto | | |
| 2006 | Bartender | Bartender B | | |
| 2006 | Black Jack 21 | Copilot, Young Kagemitsu Hazama | | |
| 2006 | Bleach | Mabashi | | |
| 2006 | Gift eternal rainbow | Sakaguchi | | |
| 2006 | Glass Fleet | Doll A, Seek | | |
| 2006 | Higurashi no Naku Koro ni | Mamoru Akasaka | | |
| 2006 | Innocent Venus | Kengo | | |
| 2006 | Kasimasi: Girl Meets Girl | Asuta Soro | | |
| 2006 | Mamoru-kun ni Megami no Shukufuku o! | Maya Sudo | | |
| 2006 | Night Head Genesis | Beta | | |
| 2006 | REC | Hatakeda | | |
| 2006 | Red Garden | Nick | | |
| 2006 | Rozen Maiden: Ouvertüre | Enju | | |
| 2006 | Soreike! Anpanman | Kuma no Ojisan | | |
| 2006 | The Melancholy of Haruhi Suzumiya | Itsuki Koizumi | | |
| 2006 | Witchblade | Osada | | |
| 2007 | Dragonaut - The Resonance | Jin Kamishina | | |
| 2007 | Engage Planet Kiss Dum | Syuu Aiba | | |
| 2007 | Genshiken 2 | Chairman | | |
| 2007 | Higurashi no Naku Koroni Kai | Mamoru Akasaka | | |
| 2007 | Idolmaster Xenoglossia | Naraba Daido | | |
| 2007 | Kaze no Stigma | Kazuma Yagami | | |
| 2007 | Kotetsushin Jeeg | Kenji Kusanagi | | |
| 2007 | Lucky Star | Himself | | |
| 2007 | Magical Girl Lyrical Nanoha StrikerS | Verossa Acous | | |
| 2007 | Minami-ke | Hosaka | | |
| 2007 | Polyphonica | Akatsuki Dillen | | |
| 2007 | Rental Magica | Kagezaki | | |
| 2007 | My Bride Is a Mermaid | Kai Mikawa | | |
| 2008 | Bihada Ichizoku | Masao Kamada | | |
| 2008 | Chaos;Head | Daisuke Misumi | | |
| 2008 | Clannad After Story | Sasaki | | |
| 2008 | Black Butler | Sebastian Michaelis | | |
| 2008 | Library War | Hikaru Asahina | | |
| 2008 | Minami-ke: Okawari | Hosaka | | |
| 2008 | Monochrome Factor | Akira Nikaidō | | |
| 2008 | Neo Angelique Abyss | Hyuga | | |
| 2008 | Neo Angelique Abyss -Second Age- | Hyuga | | |
| 2008 | Our Home's Fox Deity | Ebisu | | |
| 2008 | Sands of Destruction | Naja Gurefu | | |
| 2008 | Yozakura Quartet | Kyōsuke Kishi | | |
| 2009 | 11eyes | Kakeru Satsuki | | |
| 2009 | Battle Spirits: Shōnen Gekiha Dan | Clackey Ray | | |
| 2009 | Hanasakeru Seishōnen | Eugene Alexandr De Volkan | | |
| 2009 | The Beast Player Erin | Nason | | |
| 2009 | Minami-ke: Okaeri | Hosaka | | |
| 2009 | Miracle Train | Izayoi Tsukishima | | |
| 2009 | Pandora Hearts | Jack Vessalius | | |
| 2009 | Saki | Hagiyoshi | | |
| 2009 | Slap Up Party: Arad Senki | Danjin | | |
| 2009 | Sora no Manimani | Musa | | |
| 2009 | Sora o Miageru Shōjo no Hitomi ni Utsuru Sekai | Munto | | |
| 2009 | The Girl Who Leapt Through Space | Mr. Black Belt, Shigure Shinguji | | |
| 2009 | Umineko When They Cry | Battler Ushiromiya | | |
| 2009 | Zettai Karen Children | Vatra XVII | | |
| 2010 | Battle Spirits: Brave | Clackey Ray | | |
| 2010 | Black Butler II | Sebastian Michaelis | | |
| 2010 | Durarara!! | Shizuo Heiwajima | | |
| 2010 | Fortune Arterial: Akai Yakusoku | Kōhei Hasekura | | |
| 2010 | Giant Killing | Luigi Yoshida | | |
| 2010 | Heartcatch Precure! | Daiki | | |
| 2010 | Pokémon Ranger: Guardian Signs | Red Eye | | |
| 2010 | Psychic Detective Yakumo | Yakumo Saitō | | |
| 2010 | The Betrayal Knows My Name | Hotsuma Renjou | | |
| 2010 | The Legend of the Legendary Heroes | Sion Astarl | | |
| 2010 | Tono to Issho | Katakura Kagetsuna | | |
| 2010 | Working!! | Jun Satō | | |
| 2011 | Ao no Exorcist | Arthur Auguste Angel | | |
| 2011 | A Channel | Satō-sensei | | |
| 2011 | Bleach | Shukuro Tsukishima | | |
| 2011 | Deadman Wonderland | Nagi Kengamine | | |
| 2011 | Dog Days | General Bernard | | |
| 2011 | Heaven's Memo Pad | Sōichirō Hinamura | | |
| 2011 | Horizon in the Middle of Nowhere | Tenzou Crossunite | | |
| 2011 | Maji de Watashi ni Koi Shinasai!! | Maro Ayanokōji | | |
| 2011 | Mobile Suit Gundam AGE | Woolf Enneacle | | |
| 2011 | Nichijou | Crow | | |
| 2011 | Persona 4: The Animation | Kou Ichijou | | |
| 2011 | The Mystic Archives of Dantalian | Huey | | |
| 2011 | Tono to Issho: Gantai no Yabō | Kagetsuna Katakura | | |
| 2011 | Working'!! | Jun Satō | | |
| 2012 | AKB0048 | Teacher Ushiyama | | |
| 2012 | Brave10 | Kirigakure Saizō | | |
| 2012 | Dog Days' | Bernard Sabrage | | |
| 2012 | Horizon in the Middle of Nowhere II | Hassan Fullbush, Tenzō Crossunite | | |
| 2012 | Jewelpet KiraDeco—! | Blue Knight Ozaki / Blue | | |
| 2012 | K | Kuroh Yatogami | | |
| 2012 | Kuroko's Basketball | Shintarō Midorima | | |
| 2012 | Listen to Me, Girls. I Am Your Father! | Kōichi Nimura | | |
| 2012 | Magi: The Labyrinth of Magic | Sinbad | | |
| 2012 | Muv-Luv Alternative: Total Eclipse | Yūya Bridges | | |
| 2012 | Phi-Brain - Puzzle of God: The Orpheus Order | Doubt | | |
| 2012 | Rinne no Lagrange, | Dizelmine | | |
| 2012 | Saki Episode of Side A | Hagiyoshi | | |
| 2012 | Shirokuma Café | Llama | | |
| 2012 | The Prince of Tennis II | Kazuya Tokugawa | | |
| 2013 | AKB0048 next stage | Teacher Ushiyama | | |
| 2013 | Attack on Titan | Erwin Smith | | |
| 2013 | Brothers Conflict | Subaru | | |
| 2013 | Gargantia on the Verdurous Planet | Pinion's Big Brother | | |
| 2013 | Karneval | Hirato | | |
| 2013 | Kimi no Iru Machi | Kyōsuke Kazama | | |
| 2013 | Magi: The Kingdom of Magic | Sinbad | | |
| 2013 | Minami-ke: Tadaima | Hosaka | | |
| 2013 | Phi Brain: Kami no Puzzle | Iwashimizu-kun, Doubt | | |
| 2013 | Star Blazers 2199 | Susumu Kodai | | |
| 2013 | Tamako Market | Kaoru Hanase | | |
| 2013 | Uta no☆Prince-sama♪ Maji LOVE 2000% (Season 2) | Sumeragi Kira (HE★VENS) | | |
| 2013 | Valvrave the Liberator | Cain | | |
| 2013 | Yozakura Quartet: Hana no Uta | Kyōsuke Kishi | | |
| 2014 | Barakamon | Seishū Handa | | |
| 2014 | Black Butler: Book of Circus | Sebastian Michaelis | | |
| 2014 | Gekkan Shōjo Nozaki-kun | Mitsuya Maeno | | |
| 2014 | Gugure! Kokkuri-san | Kokkuri-san | | |
| 2014 | JoJo's Bizarre Adventure: Stardust Crusaders | Jotaro Kujo | | |
| 2014 | Kamigami no Asobi | Hades Aidoneus | | |
| 2014 | Kuroko's Basketball | Shintarō Midorima | | |
| 2014 | Noragami | Daikoku | | |
| 2014 | Persona 4 the Golden Animation | Kou Ichijou | | |
| 2014 | Saki - The Nationals | Hagiyoshi | | |
| 2014 | Sengoku Musou SP: Sanada no Shou | Sanada Nobuyuki | | |
| 2014 | Star Blazers 2199: Odyssey of the Celestial Ark | Susumu Kodai | | |
| 2014 | Terra Formars | Keiji Onizuka | | |
| 2014 | Wizard Barristers: Benmashi Cecil | Shibuki Kujira | | |
| 2014 | Yamada-kun and the Seven Witches | Ushio Igarashi | | |
| 2015 | Attack on Titan: Junior High | Erwin Smith | | |
| 2015 | Durarara!!×2 Shō | Shizuo Heiwajima | | |
| 2015 | Charlotte | Shunsuke Otosaka | | |
| 2015 | Dog Days | Bernard Sabrage | | |
| 2015 | JoJo's Bizarre Adventure: Stardust Crusaders | Jotaro Kujo | | |
| 2015 | K: Return of Kings | Kuroh Yatogami | | |
| 2015 | Kuroko's Basketball | Shintarō Midorima | | |
| 2015 | Noragami Aragato | Daikoku | | |
| 2015 | Mr. Osomatsu | Jyushimatsu Matsuno | | |
| 2015 | Samurai Warriors | Sanada Nobuyuki | | |
| 2015 | Seraph of the End | Norito Goshi | | |
| 2015 | The Disappearance of Nagato Yuki-chan | Itsuki Koizumi | | |
| 2015 | Uta no☆Prince-sama♪ Maji LOVE Revolutions (Season 3) | Sumeragi Kira (HE★VENS) | | |
| 2015 | Working!! | Jun Satō | | |
| 2015 | Yamada-kun and the Seven Witches | Ushio Igarashi | | |
| 2015 | Yowamushi Pedal | Doubashi Masakiyo | | |
| 2016 | 91 Days | Vanno | | |
| 2016 | Dimension W | Kyōma Mabuchi | | |
| 2016 | Magi: Adventure of Sinbad | Sinbad | | |
| 2016 | JoJo's Bizarre Adventure: Diamond Is Unbreakable | Jotaro Kujo | | |
| 2016 | Prince of Stride: Alternative | Heath Hasekura | | |
| 2016 | Sekkō Boys, | Mars | | |
| 2016 | Norn9 | Natsuhiko Azuma | | |
| 2016 | Please Tell Me! Galko-chan | Supoo | | |
| 2016 | Terra Formars: Revenge | Keiji Onizuka | | |
| 2016 | Tales of Zestiria the X | Dezel | | |
| 2016 | B-Project: Kodou*Ambitious | Tomohisa Kitakado | | |
| 2016 | The Disastrous Life of Saiki K. | Riki Nendō | | |
| 2016 | Servamp | Yumikage Tsukimitsu | | |
| 2016 | Twin Star Exorcists | Mikage Tsuchimikado | | |
| 2016 | Drifters | Butch Cassidy | | |
| 2016 | Watashi ga Motete Dousunda | Lord | | |
| 2016 | Uta no☆Prince-sama♪ Maji LOVE Revolutions (Season 4) | Sumeragi Kira (HE★VENS) | | |
| 2016 | Days | Atsushi Kimishita | | |
| 2016 | Touken Ranbu: Hanamaru | Sōji Okita | (eps 11–12) | |
| 2016 | Trickster | Kogorō Akechi | | |
| 2017 | Akiba's Trip: The Animation | Iketeru Masada | | |
| 2017 | Tales of Zestiria the X Season 2 | Dezel | | |
| 2017 | Attack on Titan Season 2 | Erwin Smith | | |
| 2017 | Miss Kobayashi's Dragon Maid | Fafnir | | |
| 2017 | Fuuka | Nobuaki Yahagi | | |
| 2017 | Fukumenkei Noise | Yoshito Haruno (Haruyoshi) | | |
| 2017 | Natsume Yuujinchou Roku | Aoi | | |
| 2017 | Oushitsu Kyoshi Haine | Eins von Granzreich | | |
| 2017 | Altair: A Record of Battles | Doge Antonio Lucio | | |
| 2017 | Black Clover | William Vangeance | | |
| 2017 | Tsuredure Children | Hideki Yukawa | | |
| 2017 | Kaito × Ansa | Yū Kuromu | | |
| 2017 | Katsugeki/Touken Ranbu | Ryōma Sakamoto | (ep 9 + 10) | |
| 2017 | NTR: Netsuzou Trap, | Fujiwara | | |
| 2017 | Re:Creators | Charon | | |
| 2017 | Mr. Osomatsu 2 | Jyushimatsu Matsuno | | |
| 2017 | March comes in like a lion | Gakuto Sakurai | (Season 2) | |
| 2017 | Star Blazers 2202 | Susumu Kodai | | |
| 2018 | Boarding School Juliet | Airu Inuzuka | | |
| 2018 | Attack on Titan Season 3 | Erwin Smith | | |
| 2018 | The Seven Deadly Sins : Revival of the Commandments | Drole | (ep. 12, 15 - ) | |
| 2018 | Gakuen Babysitters | Keigo Saikawa | | |
| 2018 | Hakata Tonkotsu Ramens| | Zenji Banba | | |
| 2018 | Rokuhōdō Yotsuiro Biyori | Gure | | |
| 2018 | Hakyuu Houshin Engi | younger Ki Sho and Ki Hatsu | | |
| 2018 | The Disastrous Life of Saiki K. 2 | Riki Nendou | | |
| 2018 | Cells at Work! | Killer T Cell | | |
| 2018 | Back Street Girls | Kentaro Yamamoto | | |
| 2018 | Legend of the Galactic Heroes: Die Neue These | Wolfgang Mittermeyer | | |
| 2018 | JoJo's Bizarre Adventure: Golden Wind | Jotaro Kujo | | |
| 2019 | My Roommate Is a Cat | Kuro | | |
| 2019 | B-Project: Zecchō Emotion | Tomohisa Kitakado | | |
| 2019 | Hinomaru Sumo | Masato Hyōdō | | |
| 2019 | Ace of Diamond Act II | Masamune Hongō | | |
| 2019 | Bungo Stray Dogs | A (Ace) | | |
| 2019 | The Case Files of Lord El-Melloi II: Rail Zeppelin Grace Note | Add | | |
| 2019 | BEM | Helmut Felt | | |
| 2019 | Welcome to Demon School! Iruma-kun | Kalego Naberius | | |
| 2019 | Phantasy Star Online 2: Episode Oracle | Ash | | |
| 2019 | Kemono Michi: Rise Up | Orc King | | |
| 2020 | Appare-Ranman! | Gil T. Shiga | | |
| 2020 | Somali and the Forest Spirit | Golem | | |
| 2020 | Tower of God | Phonsekal Laure | | |
| 2020 | Bessatsu Olympia Kyklos | Demetrios | | |
| 2020 | Fire Force 2nd Season | Pan Ko Paat | | |
| 2020 | The Millionaire Detective Balance: Unlimited | Ricardo | | (ep 5) |
| 2020 | Pocket Monsters 2019 | Dande (Leon) | | |
| 2020 | By the Grace of the Gods | Reinhart | | |
| 2020 | The Gymnastics Samurai | Shige Nishikiori | | |
| 2020 | Mr. Osomatsu 3 | Jyushimatsu Matsuno | | |
| 2020 | Golden Kamuy | young Yо̄ichirо̄ | | |
| 2021 | Horimiya | Kyōsuke Hori | | |
| 2021 | Kemono Jihen | Mihai | | |
| 2021 | True Cooking Master Boy Season 2 | Juchi | | |
| 2021 | Mushoku Tensei | Philip Boreas Greyrat | | |
| 2021 | Backflip!! | Masamune Shichigahama | | |
| 2021 | Tokyo Revengers | Yasuhiro Mutō | | |
| 2021 | Welcome to Demon School! Iruma-kun Season 2 | Kalego Naberius | | |
| 2021 | Life Lessons with Uramichi Oniisan | Matahiko Nekota | | |
| 2021 | Miss Kobayashi's Dragon Maid S | Fafnir | | |
| 2021 | Night Head 2041 | Naoto Kirihara | | |
| 2021 | Getter Robo Arc | Ron Schweitzer | | |
| 2021 | Bonobono | Daisu | | |
| 2021 | Selection Project | Sumipanda | | |
| 2021 | The Vampire Dies in No Time | Hiyoshi | | |
| 2021 | Kaginado | Yukito Kunisaki | | |
| 2021 | JoJo's Bizarre Adventure: Stone Ocean | Jotaro Kujo | | |
| 2021 | Star Blazers 2205 | | | |
| 2022 | In the Land of Leadale | Skargo | | |
| 2022 | Tribe Nine | Hanafuda Sakura | | |
| 2022 | Tomodachi Game | Banri Niwa | | |
| 2022 | Fuuto PI | Yukiji Bandō | | |
| 2022 | PuniRunes | Narrator | | |
| 2022 | JoJo's Bizarre Adventure: Stone Ocean | Jotaro Kujo | | |
| 2023 | High Card | Theodore Constantine Pinochle | | |
| 2023 | Sorcerous Stabber Orphen: Chaos in Urbanrama | Ed | | |
| 2023 | My Hero Academia 6 | Toshitsugu Kudo | | |
| 2023 | Opus Colors | Makoto Yanagi | | |
| 2023 | Ao no Orchestra | Hiroaki Ayukawa | | |
| 2023 | Horimiya: The Missing Pieces | Kyōsuke Hori | | |
| 2023 | The Great Cleric | Galva | | |
| 2023 | The Most Heretical Last Boss Queen | Callum | | |
| 2023 | The Family Circumstances of the Irregular Witch | Grinde | | |
| 2023 | MF Ghost | Shun Aiba | | |
| 2024 | 7th Time Loop: The Villainess Enjoys a Carefree Life Married to Her Worst Enemy! | Michel Evan | | |
| 2024 | Villainess Level 99: I May be the Hidden Boss but I'm not the Demon Lord | Demon Lord | | |
| 2024 | Doctor Elise | Lenne De Clorance | | |
| 2024 | That Time I Got Reincarnated as a Slime 3rd Season | Granbell Rosso | | |
| 2024 | Black Butler: Public School Arc | Sebastian Michaelis | | |
| 2024 | Tasūketsu | Tōjūrō Yagihashi | | |
| 2024 | Oshi no Ko 2nd Season | GOA | | |
| 2024 | Quality Assurance in Another World | Jin | | |
| 2024 | Kinnikuman: Perfect Origin Arc | Terryman | | |
| 2024 | No Longer Allowed in Another World | Kaibara | | |
| 2024 | Star Blazers: Rebel 3199 | Susumu Kodai | | |
| 2025 | Ishura Season 2 | Toroa the Awful | | |
| 2025 | #Compass 2.0: Combat Providence Analysis System | 13 | | |
| 2025 | Let's Go Karaoke! | Kyouji Narita | | |
| 2025 | Mr. Osomatsu 4 | Jyushimatsu Matsuno | | |
| 2025 | Wind Breaker Season 2 | Yamato Endō | ep. 3 (Cameo) | |
| 2025 | Lazarus | Delta President | (ep. 5) | |
| 2025 | Black Butler: Emerald Witch Arc | Sebastian Michaelis | | |
| 2025 | Fire Force 3rd Season | Pan Ko Paat | | |
| 2025 | Backstabbed in a Backwater Dungeon | Drago | | |
| 2026 | Noble Reincarnation: Born Blessed, So I'll Obtain Ultimate Power | Henry Ararat | | |
| 2026 | Please Excuse My Younger Brothers | Isao Narita | | |
| 2026 | Sparks of Tomorrow | Seiroku Sakamoto | | |
| 2026 | Super Psychic Policeman Chojo | Yuki Inukai | | |
| 2027 | Welcome to Demon School! Iruma-kun: IruMafia Edition | Kalego Naberius | | |
| 2027 | Shin Oishinbo | Ichirō Dan | | |
| 2027 | Are You a Landmine, Chihara-san? | Kazami | | |

=== Original net animation (ONA) ===
- Monster Strike (2016), Haruma Kagutsuchi
- Planetarian: The Reverie of a Little Planet (2016), Junker
- Levius (2019), Hugo Stratas
- Beyblade Burst Dynamite Battle (2021), Rashad Goodman
- Pokémon Evolutions (2021), Dande (Leon)
- JoJo's Bizarre Adventure: Stone Ocean (2021–22), Jotaro Kujo, Jotaro Kujo Look-alike
- Gaiken Shijō Shugi (2022), Takahito Saitama
- Yu-Gi-Oh! Card Game The Chronicles (2026), Zoroa

=== Original video animation (OVA) ===
2003

- Mizuiro, Kenji's father

2004

- Top wo Nerae!2, Crew A, Operator B, Governor
- Memories Off 3.5 To the Distant Memories, Ishū Sagisawa
- Memories Off 3.5 The Moment of Wishing, Ishū Sagisawa

2005

- Case Closed: The Target is Kogoro Mouri!! The Detective Boys' Secret Investigation, Masaya Murakami
- Majokko Tsukune-chan, Tony Ojisan, Kuma

2006

- Baldr Force EXE Resolution, Yosuke Kashiwagi
- Mobile Suit Gundam SEED C.E. 73: Stargazer, Sven Cal Bayan

2008

- Mahou Sensei Negima ~Shiroki Tsubasa Ala Alba~, Albireo Imma
- My Bride Is a Mermaid, Kai Mikawa
- Zombie-Loan, Shuuji Tsugumi

2009

- Higurashi no Naku Koro ni, Mamoru Akasaka
- Minami-ke Betsubara, Hosaka
- Mahou Sensei Negima ~Mou Hitotsu no Sekai~, Albireo Imma
- Saint Seiya: The Lost Canvas, Cancer Manigoldo

2010

- Kuroshitsuji: Ciel In Wonderland Part 1, Sebastian Michaelis
- Kuroshitsuji: Welcome To The Phantomhives, Sebastian Michaelis
- Yozakura Quartet ~Hoshi no Umi~, Kyōsuke Kishi

2011

- Kuroshitsuji: Ciel In Wonderland Part 2, Sebastian Michaelis
- Kuroshitsuji: His Butler, Performer, Sebastian Michaelis
- Kuroshitsuji: The Making Of Kuroshitsuji II, Sebastian Michaelis
- VitaminX Addiction, Hajime Kusanagi

2012

- A Channel, Satou Sensei
- Minami-ke Omatase, Hosaka
- Rinne no Lagrange: Kamogawa Days, Dizelmine Fin E Ld Si

2013

- Minami-ke Natsu Yasumi, Hosaka
- Yozakura Quartet ~Hana no Uta~, Kyōsuke Kishi

2014

- Attack on Titan: No Regrets, Erwin Smith
- Kuroshitsuji: Book of Murder, Sebastian Michaelis
- Magi: Adventure of Sinbad, Sinbad
- Noragami, Daikoku
- Yamada-kun and the Seven Witches OVA, Ushio Igarashi
- Uta no Prince-sama Maji LOVE Revolutions (Season 3), Sumeragi Kira (HE★VENS)

=== Animated films ===
- The Disappearance of Haruhi Suzumiya (2010), Itsuki Koizumi
- The Princess and the Pilot (2011)
- 009 Re:Cyborg (2012), Jet Link
- Nerawareta Gakuen (2012), Ryouichi Kyougoku
- Mardock Scramble:The Third Exhaust (2012), Marlowe John Fever
- K: Missing Kings (2014), Kuroh Yatogami
- New Initial D the Movie: Legend 1 - Awakening (2014), Ryosuke Takahashi
- Gantz: O (2016), Masaru Kato
- In This Corner of the World (2016), Tetsu Mizuhara
- Planetarian: Storyteller of the Stars (2016), Hoshi no Hito (young)
- Pop in Q (2016)
- Kuroko's Basketball The Movie: Last Game (2017), Shintarō Midorima
- Black Butler: Book of the Atlantic (2017), Sebastian Michaelis
- Godzilla: Planet of the Monsters (2017), Eliott Leland
- Detective Conan: The Crimson Love Letter (2017), Muga Iori
- Batman Ninja (2018), Nightwing
- K: Seven Stories (2018), Kuroh Yatogami
- Mr. Osomatsu: The Movie (2019), Jūshimatsu Matsuno
- Free! Road to the World - the Dream (2019), Kaede Kinjou
- Violence Voyager (2019), Takaaki
- Digimon Adventure: Last Evolution Kizuna (2020), Kyōtarō Imura
- Blue Thermal (2022), Yō Asahina
- Mr. Osomatsu: Hipipo-Zoku to Kagayaku Kajitsu (2022), Jūshimatsu Matsuno
- Backflip!! (2022), Masamune Shichigahama
- Black Clover: Sword of the Wizard King (2023), William Vangeance
- Fuuto PI: The Portrait of Kamen Rider Skull (2024), Yukiji Bandō
- Detective Conan: The Million-dollar Pentagram (2024), Muga Iori
- Batman Ninja vs. Yakuza League (2025), Nightwing
- Miss Kobayashi's Dragon Maid: A Lonely Dragon Wants to Be Loved (2025), Fafnir
- Zombie Land Saga: Yumeginga Paradise (2025), Naomasa Amabuki
- Armored Trooper VOTOMS: Die Graue Hexe (2026), Meteusz Julian Podolsky

=== Video games ===
- Way of the Samurai (2002) - Don Donatelouse
- Higurashi no Naku Koro ni Matsuri (2002–14) − Mamoru Akasaka
- Ys I & II: Eternal Story (2003) − Goto
- Full House Kiss (2004) − Kujo Riku
- Dororo (2004) − Kanekozo
- Planetarian: The Reverie of a Little Planet (2004) − Junker
- Fu-un Bakumatsu-den (2005) − Sakamoto Ryōma
- Full House Kiss 2 (2006) − Kujo Riku, Nakaizumi Takayuki
- Mobile Suit Gundam Seed Destiny: Federation vs. Z.A.F.T. II (2006) − Sven Cal Bayang
- Kamiwaza (2006) − Ebizou
- Kengo Zero (2006) − Sakamoto Ryōma
- Armored Core 4 (2006) − Amazigh
- Sonic the Hedgehog (2006) − Silver the Hedgehog
- Sonic and the Secret Rings (2007) − Silver the Hedgehog
- Mobile Suit Gundam: MS Sensen 0079 (2007) − Klaus Beltran
- The Promise of Haruhi Suzumiya (2007) – Itsuki Koizumi
- Sonic Riders: Zero Gravity (2008) − Silver the Hedgehog
- The Perplexity of Haruhi Suzumiya (2008) – Itsuki Koizumi
- Duel Love (2008) − Kyoji Takigawa
- Chaos;Head (2008) − Daisuke Misumi
- Mana-Khemia 2: Ochita Gakuen to Renkinjutsushi-tachi (2008) − Rozeluxe Meitzen
- Street Fighter IV games (2008–14) – El Fuerte
- Sigma Harmonics (2008) − Kurogami Shiguma
- Neo Angelique Special (2008) – Hyuga
- Cross Edge (2008) − Rozeluxe Meitzen
- The Last Remnant (2008), David Nassau
- Monochrome Factor Cross Road (2008) − Akira Nikaidou
- Tatsunoko vs. Capcom (2008) − Casshern
- Enkaku Sōsa: Shinjitsu e no 23 Nichikan (2009) − Kouji Saitou
- The King of Fighters 2002 Unlimited Match (2009) − Announcer, Nameless
- Kuroshitsuji: Phantom and Ghost (2009) − Sebastian Michaelis
- Starry☆Sky~in Spring~ (2009) − Tohzuki Suzuya
- Luminous Arc 3 (2009) − Lefi
- Final Fantasy XIII (2009) − Snow Villiers
- Spider-Man: Shattered Dimensions (2010) − Spider-Man 2099
- Sonic Colors (2010) – Silver the Hedgehog
- Starry☆Sky~After Spring~ (2010) − Tohzuki Suzuya
- Umineko: When They Cry (2010) – Battler Ushiromiya, Kinzo Ushiromiya (young)
- Ōgon Musōkyoku (2010) − Battler Ushiromiya
- The Reminiscence of Haruhi Suzumiya (2011) – Itsuki Koizumi
- The Mahjong of Suzumiya Haruhi-chan (2011) – Itsuki Koizumi
- Ōgon Musōkyoku X (2011) − Battler Ushiromiya
- Final Fantasy Type-0 (2011) − Nine
- Sonic Generations (2011) − Silver the Hedgehog
- Final Fantasy XIII-2 (2011) − Snow Villiers
- Ōgon Musōkyoku CROSS (2011) − Battler Ushiromiya, Black Battler
- Genso Suikoden: Tsumugareshi Hyakunen no Toki (2012) − Torwald Albarek
- Zero Escape: Virtue's Last Reward (2012) − K
- Fire Emblem Awakening (2012) − Frederick, Priam
- Brothers Conflict: Passion Pink (2012) − Subaru Asahina
- Devil Summoner: Soul Hackers (2012) – Shingo Sako / Six
- Bravely Default (2012) – Victor S. Court
- Muvluv Alternative Total Eclipse (2013) − Yūya Buriajisu
- Norn9 (2013) − Azuma Natsuhiko
- JoJo's Bizarre Adventure: All Star Battle (2013) − Jotaro Kujo
- Etrian Odyssey Untold: The Millennium Girl (2013) − Simon Yorke
- Brothers Conflict: Brilliant Blue (2013) − Subaru Asahina
- Lightning Returns: Final Fantasy XIII (2013) − Snow Villiers
- Granblue Fantasy (2014) − Altair, Poseidon
- Dengeki Bunko: Fighting Climax (2014) – Shizuo Heiwajima
- Samurai Warriors 4 (2014) − Nobuyuki Sanada
- Tales of Zestiria (2015) − Dezel
- Dragon Quest Heroes (2015) – Psaro
- Final Fantasy Type-0 HD (2015) − Nine
- Norn9: Last Era (2015) – Natsuhiko Azuma
- Fire Emblem Fates (2015) − Suzukaze
- 7th Dragon III: Code VFD (2015) – Player (Male)
- JoJo's Bizarre Adventure: Eyes of Heaven (2015) − Jotaro Kujo
- 100 Sleeping Princes and the Kingdom of Dreams (2015) - Apollo, Sebastian
- Attack on Titan (2016) − Erwin Smith
- Skullgirls 2nd Encore (2016) − Beowulf
- Zero Escape: Zero Time Dilemma (2016) − Sigma
- Norn9: Act Tune (2016) – Natsuhiko Azuma
- World of Final Fantasy (2016) − Snow Villiers
- Samurai Warriors: Spirit of Sanada (2016) – Nobuyuki Sanada
- Osomatsu-san the Game: Hachamecha Shūshoku Advice – Dead or Work (2016) – Jyushimatsu Matsuno
- Valkyria: Azure Revolution (2017) − Amleth Glenkaer
- Fire Emblem Heroes (2017) − Frederick, Suzukaze
- Dissidia Final Fantasy Opera Omnia (2017) − Snow Villiers
- Osomatsu-san the Game: Hachamecha shuushoku adobaisu - Deddo oa wâku (2017) – Jyushimatsu Matsuno
- Fire Emblem Warriors (2017) – Frederick
- Sonic Forces (2017) − Silver the Hedgehog
- Neo Angelique: Angel's Tears (2017) – Hyuga
- Warriors Orochi 4 (2018) – Nobuyuki Sanada
- Jump Force (2019) − Jotaro Kujo
- Dissidia Final Fantasy NT (2019) − Snow Villiers
- Saint Seiya Awakening (2019) – Julian Solo/Poseidon
- Team Sonic Racing (2019) – Silver the Hedgehog
- Pokémon Masters EX (2019) – Grimsley, Brycen
- JoJo's Bizarre Adventure: Last Survivor (2019) – Jotaro Kujo
- The King of Fighters All Star (2019) – Nameless
- Shin Megami Tensei III: Nocturne HD Remaster (2020) – Hikawa
- The Legend of Heroes: Trails Through Daybreak (2021) – Van Arkride
- Alchemy Stars (2022) – Fafnir
- The Legend of Heroes: Trails Through Daybreak II (2022) – Van Arkride, Grendel
- JoJo's Bizarre Adventure: All-Star Battle R (2022) − Jotaro Kujo
- Dragon Quest Treasures (2022) – Shady, Monsters
- Onmyoji (2022) – Izanagi
- Onmyoji Arena (2022) – Inryou/Yinliang
- Honkai: Star Rail (2023) – Jing Yuan
- Genshin Impact (2023) – Wriothesley
- Arknights (2024) - Ulpianus
- Final Fantasy XIV: Dawntrail (2024) - Zoraal Ja
- The Legend of Heroes: Trails Beyond the Horizon (2024) – Van Arkride, Grendel
- Shuten Order (2025) – Kishiru Inugami
- Goblin Slayer Another Adventurer: Nightmare Feast (TBA) – Polar Bear Priest

Unknown date

- Asaki, Yumemishi (?) − Yaegaki Chihaya
- Hoshi no Furu Toki (?) − Toshi Arima
- Ijiwaru My Master (?) − Evans
- KoiGIG〜DEVIL×ANGEL〜 (?) − Shuu
- Little Aid (?) − Yuzuru Sawato
- Mahou Tsukai to Goshujin sama (?) − Seras Dragoon
- Mizu no Senritsu (?) − Masatsugu Kirihara
- Mizu no Senritsu Tsūhi no Kioku (?) − Masatsugu Kirihara
- Panic Palette (?) − Yuzuru Sawato
- Princess Nightmare (?) − Ichirouta Inukai
- R.O.H.A.N. (?) − Half-elf
- Vitamin series, Hajime Kusanagi
  - VitaminX (?)
  - VitaminX Evolution (?)
  - VitaminY (?)
  - VitaminZ (?)

=== Live action ===
- Air ~prelude~
- Air MEMORIES
- Farewell, Kamen Rider Den-O: Final Countdown
- ETERNAL VALENTINE in HOTEL MAUSU
- STARCHILD Presents 〜Starchild Collection〜

2006

- Neo Romance Ala Mode 2

2007

Fullhouse Kiss Shokei Festival 2007

- Neo Romance Live Hot! 10 count down Radio ROCKET PUNCH
- Neo Romance Festa Summer 2007
- Suzumiya Haruhi no Gekisou
- Vitamin X Ikuzee! Tokimeki ★ Full Burst

2008

- Fullhouse Kiss Shokei Festival 2008
- Original Entertainment Paradise "OREPARA" 2008 LIVE DVD
- Vitamin X Ikuzee! Tokimeki ★ Full Burst EVOLUTION

2009

- Kuroshitsuji "Sono Shitsuji, Shuushou ~Saigo no Bansan wo Anata to Tomo ni~"
- Original Entertainment Paradise "OREPARA" 2009 LIVE DVD

2010

- Kuroshitsuji "Sono Shitsuji, Kyoso ~Akai Valentine~" Event DVD"

2018

- Half Blue Sky, Kagami yo Kagami (voice)

2022

- Mr. Osomatsu, Jūshimatsu (voice)

2023

- Ranman, Tedai of Sengokuya

=== Radio ===
- Ono Daisuke no GIG ra Night! (Internet radio・RADIO Kansai, Ltd.)
- Kamiya Hiroshi・Ono Daisuke no DearGirl〜Stories〜 (Nippon Cultural Broadcasting)
- Neoromance・Live HOT! 10 Count down Radio II Huu!
- Lucky ☆ Channel (34th and 35th broadcast)

=== BLCDs ===
- Aishiteru (Youko Fujitani), Ichise Kazushi
- Animamundi
- Binan no Dendou Series, Christian Bernadotte
- Bitter Valentine
- Chintsubu Series: Chinko no Tsubuyaki Hiroo (V2)
- Doki Doki Renai
- Dorei Series
- Furachi na Koi no Prince
- Hanafurirou Series
- Hanayome Series, Shino
- Hanayome wa Nido Sarawareru
- Himegimi no Koshiire
- Honoka na Koi no Danpen wo, Shenjin
- Iro Otoko, Chouji Ishikawa
- Iro Otoko ~Kyoudai Hen~, Chouji Ishikawa
- Kazahana
- Kotonoha no Hana Series 1: Kotonoha no Hana, Shuichi Hasebe
- Kotonoha no Hana Series 2: Kotonoha no Sekai, Shuu
- Miwaku no Ringo, Ichijou Rei
- Name of Love, Kouhei
- Omae wa, Ai wo Kuu Kedamono
- Ore no Aniki ni Te o Dasu na
- Reload, Keiji Kazuma
- Renai Days ~Hitotsu Yane no Shita~
- Renai Keiyaku Series
- Rossellini Ke no Musuko Series, Akira Hayase
- Ryuu to Ryuu Series
- S de Gomen ne
- Sayonara wo Iu Ki wa Nai Series
- Shinkan wa Ou ni Aisareru Series
- Shinkuu Yuusetsu Series
- Shugoreisama ni Tsuitekoi ♥ (Protection Spirit in the Way of Love)
- Soshite Koi ga Hajimaru
- Super Lovers, Shima Kaidou
- Toriko ni Saseru Kiss o Shiyou
- Toritsu Mahou Gakuen, Kouji Yuno
- Toukaidou Hisame ~Kagerou~, Hibiki
- Yasashiku Koroshite, Boku no Kokoro wo
- Yumemiru Seiza/Saredo Utsukushiki Hibi - Beautiful Days section, Class President
- Yumemiru Seiza/Natsu no Michishirube - Summer Landmarks section, Minoru
- Yuuwaku Recipe series, Takuro
- Ze, Ryuusei

=== Other drama CDs ===
- Asagaya Zippy, John
- Buso Renkin, Homunculus Satou
- Category: Freaks, Naoki Amano
- Idolmaster: Xenoglossia series, Naraba Daidō:
  - Idolmaster: Xenoglossia Original Drama Vol. 2
  - Idolmaster: Xenoglossia Original Drama Vol. 3
- Karensakakōkō Karenhōsōbu, Tōru Sakaki
- Karneval, Hirato
- Kaze no Stigma, Kazuma Yagami
- KoiGIG-Let It Bleed-, Shuu
- Kuroshitsuji, Sebastian Michaelis
- Magical Girl Lyrical Nanoha StrikerS Sound Stage, Verossa Acous
- The Melancholy of Haruhi Suzumiya: Sound Around, Itsuki Koizumi
- Memories Off, Ishū Sagisawa
- Monochrome Factor, Akira Nikaidou
- Neo Angelique series, Hyuga:
  - Neo Angelique 〜Silent Doll〜
  - Neo Angelique 〜My First Lady〜
  - Neo Angelique 〜Romantic Gift〜
  - Neo Angelique 〜Tasoga no Kishi〜
  - Neo Angelique 〜Akatsuki no Tenshi〜
- Oresama Teacher, Yuuto Maizono
- Rust Blaster, Aldred Van Envrio
- Sacrificial Princess and the King of Beasts,
- Shinakoi, Ryuunosuke Sakaki
- S.L.H Stray Love Hearts!, Kuga Reizei
- Special A, Aoi Ogata
- Starry Sky ~in Spring~, Tohzuki Suzuya
- VitaminX series, Hajime Kusanagi:
  - Ultra Vitamin
  - Ultra Vitamin II -Maximum Baka-
- Zombie-Loan, Shuuji Tsugumi

=== Tokusatsu ===
- Kamen Rider Den-O - Teddy
- Ultraman Taiga - Opening Narrator/Taiga Spark Announcement

== Dubbing roles ==
=== Live action ===
- Barbie, Tourist Ken (Simu Liu)
- The Broken Hearts Gallery, Nick (Dacre Montgomery)
- Dolittle, Chee-Chee (Rami Malek)
- Doctor Strange, Karl Mordo (Chiwetel Ejiofor)
- Doctor Strange in the Multiverse of Madness, Karl Mordo (Chiwetel Ejiofor)
- Elvis, Elvis Presley (Austin Butler)
- Enthiran, Dr. Vasigaran / Chitti (Rajinikanth)
- The Fate of the Furious, Eric Reisner (Scott Eastwood)
- Five Fingers, Martijn (Ryan Phillippe)
- Gotham, James Gordon (Ben McKenzie)
- The High Note, David Cliff (Kelvin Harrison Jr.)
- It Chapter Two, Ben Hanscom (Jay Ryan)
- Jexi, Brody (Justin Hartley)
- Jurassic World Rebirth, Martin Krebs (Rupert Friend)
- Kite, Oburi (Callan McAuliffe)
- Leonardo, Leonardo da Vinci (Aidan Turner)
- Little Miss Sunshine, Dwayne Hoover (Paul Dano)
- The Man, Booty (Anthony Mackie)
- The Man Who Invented Christmas, Charles Dickens (Dan Stevens)
- The Matrix Resurrections, Sequoia (Toby Onwumere)
- Missing, Agent Park (Daniel Henney)
- MotherFatherSon, Caden Finch (Billy Howle)
- The O.C., Ryan Atwood (Ben McKenzie)
- Pacific Rim: Uprising, Nathan Lambert (Scott Eastwood)
- Pee Mak, Mak (Mario Maurer)
- Resident Evil, hospital intercom (Zach Cregger)
- Running Wild with Bear Grylls, Bear Grylls
- Shazam!, Adult Freddy Freeman (Adam Brody)
- Shazam! Fury of the Gods, Adult Freddy Freeman (Adam Brody)
- Teenage Mutant Ninja Turtles: Out of the Shadows, Casey Jones (Stephen Amell)
- Trap, Cooper (Josh Hartnett)
- Wonder Woman, Steve Trevor (Chris Pine)
- Wonder Woman 1984, Steve Trevor (Chris Pine)

=== Animation ===
- Adventure Time, Prince Gumball
- The Croods, Guy
- The Croods: A New Age, Guy
- Epic, Nod
- Lookism, Jin Ho Bin/Takahito Saitama
- Love, Death & Robots, Liang
- Transformers: Cyberverse, Backbite
- X-Men: Evolution, Alex Summers / Havok

== Discography ==
=== Personal works ===
| Date Released | Single Name |
| January 23, 2008 | Amaoto (雨音) |
| August 6, 2008 | Manatsu no Spica (真夏のスピカ) |
| September 9, 2009 | Kinmokusei (キンモクセイ) |
| December 22, 2010 | Netsuretsu ANSWER (熱烈ANSWER) |
| November 30, 2011 | DELIGHT (DELIGHT) |
| September 26, 2012 | Lunar Maria (Lunar Maria) |
| November 19, 2014 | Mission D (Mission D) |
| November 4, 2015 | Hero (ヒーロー) |
| November 30, 2016 | Orion no Yoru (オリオンの夜) |
| June 28, 2017 | ROSA ~Blue Ocean~ (ROSA ~Blue Ocean~) |
| January 31, 2018 | Endless happy world (Endless happy world) |

| Date Released | Album Name |
| February 25, 2009 | Kazahana (風花) |
| April 18, 2018 | STARTRAIN (STARTRAIN) |

| Date Released | Mini Album Name |
| June 27, 2007 | Hinemosu (ひねもす) |
| September 25, 2013 | UP STAIRS (UP STAIRS); DOWN STAIRS (DOWN STAIRS) |
| July 1, 2015 | DOORS (DOORS) |

=== Character song CD ===
==== 2006 ====
Full House Kiss ~ Single Collection Vol. 13

- ｢Seishun Aftermath｣ (with Kenichi Suzumura)

Neo Angelique ~ My First Lady

- ｢Shikon no Kadou｣

Tensei Hakken Fuumoroku ~ Aratanaru Kage

- ｢Treasure In My Heart ~Kokoro No Takaramono~｣

==== 2007 ====
Kamen Rider Den-O ~｢Chou Climax Jump｣

- ｢Chou Climax Jump｣ (with Kenichi Suzumura, Toshihiko Seki, Koji Yusa, Dori Sakurada, Tamaki Matsumoto, Rina Akiyama, Kenjirō Ishimaru & Masaki Terasoma)

KoiGIG ~DEVIL×ANGEL~ Battle Love

- ｢Battle Love｣｣ (with Hisayoshi Suganuma, Wataru Hatano & Koichi Tochika )

KoiGIG ~DEVIL×ANGEL~ ROAD THAT BELIEVE

- ｢Aoi Shiroki Tsuki No Noroi｣
- ｢Fly to the victory road｣

Mamoru-kun ni Megami no Shukufuku wo! Original Character Song Disk 1

- ｢東ビ王誕生！｣(with Akiko Kimura, Mikako Takahashi, Mamiko Noto, Kimiko Koyama, Saeko Chiba, Yuki Iguchi, Fuyuka Oura & Shintaro Ohata)

Mamoru-kun ni Megami no Shukufuku wo! Original Character Song Disk 4

- ｢ああ東ビ戦隊マヤレンジャー｣ (with Akiko Kimura, Mikako Takahashi, Mamiko Noto, Kimiko Koyama, Saeko Chiba, Yuki Iguchi, Fuyuka Oura & Shintaro Ohata)

Mamoru-kun ni Megami no Shukufuku wo! Original Character Song Disk 5

- ｢You are NO.1｣ (with Akiko Kimura, Shintaro Ohata, Taku Kimura & Taiten Kusunoki)

Princess Nightmare ~ Character Song Vol.1

- ｢Omae Dake no Hero｣

Suzumiya Haruhi no Yuutsu Character Song VOL.8

- ｢Hare Hare Yukai (Itsuki Koizumi ver.)｣
- ｢Maggaare Spectacle｣

Vitamin X ~ Diamond Single

- ｢Houkago Eden ~Diamond Ver｣ (with Tatsuhisa Suzuki)
- ｢Shooting Star ~Diamond Ver｣ (with Tatsuhisa Suzuki)

==== 2008 ====
Dear My Sun!!

- ｢Shigatsu No Kaze｣ (with Hiroki Shimowada & Hiroshi Okamoto)

Dragonaut ~ Character Song Vol. 1

- ｢Tenohira no Naka no Kiseki｣

Dragonaut ~ Character Song Vol. 5

- ｢Venus! Venus!｣

Hanayoi Romanesque ~ Saigo No Piece

- ｢Saigo No Piece｣ (with Hikaru Midorikawa)

Higurashi no Naku Koro ni Kai ~ Irie-tachi no Gyakushuu

- ｢BUCHIKAMACE 徹甲弾！｣

Kuroshitsuji Character Song ｢Sono Shitsuji, Kashou｣

- ｢Anata no Koe ga Iroaseyou Tomo, Meiyaku no Uta ga Sono mune ni Todokimasu you ni｣
- ｢Tsuki no Ame｣

Monochrome Factor ED ~ AWAKE ~Boku no Subete~

- ｢Awake Boku no Subete｣ (with Hiroshi Kamiya)

Monochrome Factor Character Song Factor 1. Akira

- ｢Destiny｣

Monochrome Factor PS2 Cross Road OST

- ｢AWAKE ~Boku no Subete~ Another Side｣

Neo Angelique ~ Sincerely

- ｢Tsukibae no Yasouku｣

Neo Angelique Abyss ~ Joy To The World

- ｢Joy To The World｣ (with Hiroki Takahashi, Toru Ohkawa & Masaya Onosaka)
- ｢Platonic Garden｣ (with Hiroki Takahashi, Toru Ohkawa & Masaya Onosaka)

Neo Angelique Abyss Character Song~ Scene 05

- ｢Rinka no Shiku｣

Neo Angelique Abyss ~Second Age~ Silent Destiny

- ｢Eternal Green~Kimi to iu Eien｣ (with Hiroki Takahashi, Toru Ohkawa & Masaya Onosaka)
- ｢Silent Destiny｣ (with Hiroki Takahashi, Toru Ohkawa & Masaya Onosaka)

Neo Angelique Abyss ~ Sunshine Party

- ｢PROUD YOU｣ (with Daisuke Hirakawa)
- ｢Sunshine Party｣ (with Daisuke Hirakawa)

Neo Angelique Abyss ~ Variety 1

- ｢Obuhanta 5 no Theme｣｣ (with Hiroki Takahashi, Toru Ohkawa, Masaya Onosaka & Aya Endo)

Petit Four ~ Character CD Vol. 2

- ｢Renjyo｣
- ｢IINO?｣(Daisuke Ono & Shinnosuke Tachibana)

My Bride Is a Mermaid

- ｢Psychedelic Brother｣ (with Masashi Yabe)

Shina Dark: Kuroki Tsuki no ou to Soheiki no Himegimi

- ｢Oukoku Machi Wa Tongue Hawk Turn｣ (with Kana Hanazawa, Ayako Kawasumi & Hiroki Yasumoto)

Suzumiya Haruhi no Yuutsu Shin ~ Character Song VOL.4

- ｢"Tsumaranai Hanashi desu yo" to boku ha iu｣
- ｢Tada no Himitsu｣

True Fortune ~ Uranai Hanasanai Kaesanai

- ｢Uranai Hanasanai Kaesanai｣(with Mamoru Miyano, Tomokazu Sugita, Hikaru Midorikawa, Kisho Taniyama & Hisafumi Oda)
- ｢Uranai Hanasanai Kaesanai Ver.2｣ (with Mamoru Miyano)

Vitamin X ~ Greatest Hits ~

- ｢Houkago Eden｣ (with Tatsuhisa Suzuki)
- ｢Kindan Secret Romance｣ (with Tatsuhisa Suzuki)
- ｢Kizu Darake No Eternity｣
- ｢Mayonaka kyuseisyu｣ (with Tatsuhisa Suzuki)
- ｢Shooting Star｣ (with Tatsuhisa Suzuki)

==== 2009 ====
Kura Noah ~Cry No More~ Boku to Kimi No Sekai

- ｢Cry No More ~Boku to Kimi No Sekai｣ (with Hiro Shimono)

Kura Noah ~Cry No More~ Love & Heaven/Blooming Moon

- ｢Love & Heaven｣

Minami-ke ~ Character Song Best Album

- ｢No Problem｣
- ｢Curry Song｣ (with Minori Chihara)

Miracle ☆ Train Vol. 4 ~Izayoi Tsukishima

- ｢Home Station｣
- ｢Senro ha hashiru 6 no ji ni ~ Ooedo-sen he youkoso ~ Tsukishima ver.~｣

Neo Angelique Special ~ Platinum Harmony

- ｢Home Sweetest Home｣ (with Toru Ohkawa)
- ｢Treasure Tomorrow｣ (with Hiroki Takahashi, Toru Ohkawa, Masaya Onosaka, Kappei Yamaguchi & Daisuke Hirakawa)
- ｢Kurenai no Rondo｣｣ (with Kappei Yamaguchi)
- ｢Kiseki~The Brilliant Days｣

Nyoron☆Churuya-san ~ YouTube Anime Session Image CD.3

- ｢Machigatte Sumochitaberu｣ (with Yuki Matsuoka)

Rikei Danshi. Benkyo ni Naru!? Character Song 1 Vol.4

- ｢Genshibunshi MAIN ~ Bokura no Rikashitsu (Soroba Jon ver.)｣
- ｢Mayoi no Nucleotide｣

Suzumiya Haruhi-chan no Yuutsu ~ OP&ED Ima made no Arasuji

- ｢Atogaki You na Mono｣ (with Tomokazu Sugita, Aya Hirano, Minori Chihara & Yuko Goto)
- ｢Ima made no Arasuji｣ (with Tomokazu Sugita, Aya Hirano, Minori Chihara & Yuuko Goto)

Original Drama Series 響演 第6弾「Wish」

- 「Type two」

==== 2010 ====
Durarara!! DVD Vol.3 Tokuten Cover Song Collection of Shizuo Heiwajima

- ｢Tsugaru Kaikyo Fuyugeshiki｣

FULL SCORE Vol 04 ~ Mixture

- ｢Borderless Music!!!｣ (with Koji Yusa, Mamoru Miyano, Daisuke Hirakawa, Hiroyuki Yoshino & Kisho Taniyama)

Kamen Rider Den-O ~｢Chou Jump Double-Action Strike form｣

- ｢Double-Action Strike form｣(with Dori Sakurada)
- ｢Double-Action Strike form ~ Teddy Ver.｣

Kuroshitsuji II ~ Character Song Vol. 1 ｢Kuroshitsuji, Nessou｣

- ｢You will rule the world｣
- ｢Aru Shitsuji no Nichijou｣

Mahou Sensei Negima! Mou Hitotsu no Sekai ~ Theme Song Collection

- ｢Get a Chance！｣ (with Rikiya Koyama, Marina Inoue, Rina Satou, Yumi Shimura, Yuki Matsuoka & Masahito Yabe)

Quin Rose ~ Wizard and The Master ~ Une etoile

- ｢Jekyll to Hyde｣

Riaru_Riaru ga_Anriaru

- ｢Riaru_Riaru ga_Anriaru｣ (with Sayuri Gotou)
- ｢少年少女達成団｣ (with Sayuri Gotou)

Rikei Danshi. Benkyo ni Naru!? ~ Character song 2 Vol.1

- ｢Youryokuso tai ~Boku to kimi to midori to hikari~｣
- ｢Shinkaron☆Miracle｣
- ｢fellow Sozoro follow｣ (with Nobuhiko Okamoto)

"Key / Missing You" – as Jangled Cat. Opening song for Psychic Detective Yakumo. Reached No. 36 in Oricon charts.

- ｢Key ~ Phase 1｣
- ｢Key ~ Phase 2｣
- ｢Key｣

Uragiri Wa Boku No Namae Wo Shitteiru ~ Original Drama Vol.4

- ｢O.A.T.H｣

Vitamin X ~ Evolution Plus「一撃SN†PER」

- ｢一撃SNIPER｣ (with Tatsuhisa Suzuki)
- ｢一撃SNIPER ~ Hajime Ver｣

Working!! Ending Theme

- ｢Heart no Edge ni Idomou｣ (with Jun Fukuyama & Hiroshi Kamiya)

==== 2011 ====
A Channel

- ｢Kimi no Te｣

Densetsu no Yusha no Densetsu ~ Character Song Sion

- ｢Hikari to Kattou no Shoushitsuten｣

Densetsu no Yusha no Densetsu ~ Blu-ray Vol.12

- ｢君思う空の下｣ (with Jun Fukuyama)

Minami-ke Vol. 9 ~ Drama CD + Character songs

- ｢Let's Oyasai｣ (with Minori Chihara)

Otomen Charity Song Project ~Brand New Love~

- ｢Ever Smile｣ SHOW&KENN with ALL FRIENDS (with Kenn, Kenji Nojima, Showtaro Morikubo, Tsubasa Yonaga, Hiroaki Miura & Tomoaki Maeno)

Rikei Danshi. Benkyo ni Naru!? ~ Character song 3

- ｢Fall in love 完了!｣
- ｢30 minutes Shootin' Star｣ (with Hiroshi Kamiya)

Tonari no Kaibutsu-kun ~ Drama CD

- ｢Ore to Bat to Tama to Ore｣

Vitamin X ~ OAD Addiction ~ Character song 02

- ｢100V no Ai Shogeki｣
- ｢100V no Ai Shogeki ~ びた★ぱら Re-Mix☆EXTREAM｣

Vitamin X Addiction ~ Ending Theme 1

- ｢Gakuen Frontier ~ Tsubasa & Hajime｣(with Tatsuhisa Suzuki)
- ｢Gakuen Frontier ~ Hajime Ver.｣

Vitamin X Addiction ~ Opening Theme

- ｢Dekiai X ~ Tsubasa & Hajime｣ (with Tatsuhisa Suzuki)
- ｢Dekiai X ~ Hajime Ver.｣

Vitamin X to Z ~ RED-SKY

- ｢ENDLESS SKY｣ (Daisuke Ono & Tomoaki Maeno)
- ｢ENDLESS SKY ~ Hajime Ver.｣

Working'!! ~ Ending Theme

- ｢Itsumo you ni LOVE & PEACE!!｣ (with Jun Fukuyama & Kamiya Hiroshi)

WORKING!! きゃらそん☆MENU 06

- ｢SUGAR & SPICE｣
- ｢Wagnaria Sanka ~ A Day of Sato Jun｣

==== 2012 ====
Brave 10

- ｢Seirei Hirai｣
- ｢Seirei Hirai bravery mix｣(with Tetsuya Kakihara)

K vol.1 Bonus CD

- ｢レジェンド台所｣

Kuroko No Basuke ~ Solo Series Vol.4 ~ Midorima Shintarou

- ｢狙い通りのDestiny｣
- ｢曰く蟹座の吉日に｣

Kuroko no Basuke Duet Series vol.3

- ｢とある信者の果敢な毎日｣(Daisuke Ono & Tatsuhisa Suzuki)
- ｢明日へ連れて｣(Daisuke Ono & Tatsuhisa Suzuki)
- ｢とある信者の果敢な毎日 ~Takao Off Ver.~｣

Kuroko No Basuke ~ Vol.4 Special CD feat. Midorima Shintarou

- ｢Seishun TIP-OFF!!~ MVP Midorima ver.｣

Mobile Suit Gundam AGE ~ Character Song Album Vol.1

- ｢PRIDE OF WHITE｣

Mobile Suit Gundam AGE ~ Character Song Album Vol.2

- ｢SOUL OF WHITE.｣

Vitamin Series ~ That's Entertainment!B6&T6 SHOW #1～翼と葛城/一と鳳～ (2012-07-11)

- ｢あなたの瞳の中の消しゴム～記憶喪失な夜～｣(Daisuke Ono & Kazuhiko Inoue)

VitaminX Character Song CD ~ That's Entertainment!B6&T6 SHOW #4 ～VitaminXのテーマ/永田～(2012-08-22)

- ｢ENDLESS X!!!｣(with Tatsuhisa Suzuki, Kosuke Toriumi, Hiroyuki Yoshino, Daisuke Kishio & Hisayoshi Suganuma)

Vitamin X ~ Detective B6 「 Agent √CODE」

- ｢探偵 √CODE｣(Daisuke Ono & Tatsuhisa Suzuki)
- ｢ANOTHER WORLD｣(Daisuke Ono & Tatsuhisa Suzuki)
- ｢ANOTHER WORLD ~ Hajime Ver｣

VS/Sweet nest

- ｢VS｣(Daisuke Ono & Takayuki Kondo)
- ｢Sweet nest｣(Daisuke Ono & Takayuki Kondo)

Yozakura Quartet ~ character song album

- ｢phaser braver｣

おれパラ ~ 5th Anniversary ALBUM おれクル?

- ｢眠るものたちへ～おれパラver～｣
- ｢Galaxy Bus｣

==== 2013 ====
Brothers Conflict Ending Theme (2013/07/31)

- ｢14 to 1｣ (ASAHINA Bros.+JULI)

Disney Date Koe no Oujisama ~ Special Anniversary Edition

- ｢It's So Much Fun｣
- ｢Dream goes on ~Magic Key｣ (with Takuma Terashima)
- ｢Dream goes on ~Magic Key｣ (Ono Daisuke Solo)

Ijiin Idol Project Reki Sing ♪ 3 ~ Sakamoto Ryouma

- ｢タイトル未定｣

K vol.7 Bonus CD

- ｢Tales of Black dog｣

Kamigami no Asobi Character song Apollon & Hades (2013/06/26)

- ｢絶えない祈り｣

Karneval ~ Character Song Vol.3 (2013/07/10)

- ｢La fin de l'éclipse｣ (with Hirakawa Daisuke)

Magi: The Labyrinth of Magic Vol.3 Bonus CD

- ｢Sail for Triumph｣

Minami-ke Tadaima ~ Character song Album "Minami-ke no Mina Uta

- ｢LOVE POWER｣
- ｢Coleslaw no Uta｣
- ｢Let's Oyasai｣
- ｢B.B.Q. no Uta｣
- ｢Christmas no Uta｣

New Prince of Tennis ~ THE BEST OF U-17 PLAYERS IX Tokugawa Kazuya (2013/07/24)

- ｢Survival Destiny｣

Shiny x Shiny

- ｢Shiny x Shiny｣ (with Kamiya Hiroshi)

Shirokuma Cafe 8th Outro Theme: Lama-San no Lama Mambo

- ｢Lama-San no Lama Mambo｣
- ｢Shirokuma Cafe ~Lama~｣

VitaminR Opening theme

- ｢絶対不滅の愛(ダイヤモンド)｣ (with Tatsuhisa Suzuki)
- ｢絶対不滅の愛(ダイヤモンド)｣ (Ono Daisuke's solo)

==== 2014 ====
Sengoku Musou 4 Ouka Ranman

- ｢Ouju ga Gotoku｣

'"Kamigami no Asobi

- 『I Miss You』

==== 2015 ====
Eikyuu Paradise (永久パラダイス) (2015/09/11)

- ｢Eikyuu Paradise｣ (with cast of B-Project)

Koiseyo Otome (恋セヨ乙女) (2015/11/25) (with Daisuke Kishio)

- ｢Koiseyo Otome｣
- ｢Karma｣
- ｢Eikyuu Paradise (Kitakore Ver.)｣
- ｢Kitakore Secret Talk (Drama Story)｣

==== 2016 ====
Mysterious Kiss (2016/04/06) (with Daisuke Kishio)

- ｢Mysterious Kiss｣
- ｢Wonderful Days｣

Kodō＊Ambitious (鼓動＊アンビシャス, Kodō＊Anbishasu) (2016/06/07)

- ｢Kodō＊Ambitious｣ (with cast of B-Project)
- ｢Ashita wa, Kyou Yori Yume Miyou (明日は、今日より夢見よう)｣ (with Daisuke Kishio)

Hoshi to Tsuki no Sentence (星と月のセンテンス) (2016/07/27)

- ｢'Hoshi to Tsuki no Sentence (星と月のセンテンス)｣ (with Daisuke Kishio)

Muteki＊Dangerous (無敵＊デンジャラス, Muteki＊Denjyarasu) (2016/12/21) (with cast of B-Project)

- ｢Muteki＊Dangerous｣
- ｢Eikyuu Paradise (14 Vocal Ver.)｣
- ｢Eikyuu Paradise (Short Size)｣
- ｢Muteki＊Dangerous -message from B-｣

==== 2017 ====
B-Project: Kodō＊Ambitious Volume 6 (2017/01/25)

- ｢Starrynight Cinderella｣

Wonder☆Future (ワンダー☆フューチャー, Wandā☆Fyūchā) (2017/03/15) (with Daisuke Kishio)

- ｢Wonder☆Future｣
- ｢Vivid Scenery｣

Hope Of Mankind (2017/06/21)

S-Kyuu Paradise (S級パラダイス) BLACK (2017/07/19)

- ｢S-Kyuu Paradise｣ (with cast of B-Project)
- ｢Muteki＊Dangerous｣ (with cast of B-Project)
- ｢Karma｣ (with Daisuke Kishio)
- ｢Mysterious Kiss｣ (with Daisuke Kishio)

S-Kyuu Paradise (S級パラダイス) WHITE (2017/07/19)

- ｢S-Kyuu Paradise｣ (with cast of B-Project)
- ｢Jikū no Rasen (時空の螺旋)｣ (with Daisuke Kishio)
- ｢Eikyuu Paradise｣ (with cast of B-Project)
- ｢Wonder☆Future｣ (with Daisuke Kishio)
- ｢Wonderful Days｣ (with Daisuke Kishio)
- ｢Koiseyo Otome｣ (with Daisuke Kishio)

== Awards ==
| Year | Award | Category | Nominated work | Result | Ref. |
|---|---|---|---|---|---|
| 2008 | 2nd Seiyu Awards | Best Supporting Actor | | Won | |
| 2010 | 33rd Anime Grand Prix | Voice Actor of the Year | | Won | |
| 2010 | 4th Seiyu Awards | Best Actor | | Won | |
| 2015 | 9th Seiyu Awards | Best Actor | | Won | |
| 2015 | 9th Seiyu Awards | Best Personality | —N/a | Won | |
| 2015 | 2nd AniRadi Awards | Best Male Radio | Hiroshi Kamiya and Daisuke Ono's Dear Girl: Stories (with Hiroshi Kamiya) | Won | |
| 2015 | 2nd AniRadi Awards | Radio of the Year | Hiroshi Kamiya and Daisuke Ono's Dear Girl: Stories (with Hiroshi Kamiya) | Won | |
