= Dear Girl: Stories =

Japanese radio program

- Hiroshi Kamiya and Daisuke Ono's Dear Girl: Stories
- Logo (as of 2025)

神谷浩史・小野大輔のDearGirl〜Stories〜 (Kamiya Hiroshi, Ono Daisuke no Dear Girl: Stories)
- Audio drama
- Directed by: Ryo Yokokawa
- Produced by: Hiroyuki Uchida
- Written by: Masaru Suwa
- Studio: Animelo Mix; ASCII Media Works; Dwango User Entertainment; Dwango Creative School
- Station: Nippon Cultural Broadcasting; Radio Osaka; Chō! A&G+
- Original run: April 7, 2007 – present
- Episodes: 962
- Manga

Dear Girl: Stories Hibiki
- Written by: Masaru Suwa
- Illustrated by: Saya Iwasaki
- Published by: ASCII Media Works
- Imprint: Sylph Comics
- Magazine: Sylph
- Original run: March 23, 2009 – February 22, 2012
- Volumes: 4
- Manga

Dear Girl: Stories Hizuki
- Written by: Masaru Suwa
- Illustrated by: Ren Hidoh
- Published by: ASCII Media Works
- Imprint: Sylph Comics
- Magazine: Sylph
- Original run: November 22, 2012 – October 22, 2014
- Volumes: 4

Hiroshi Kamiya and Daisuke Ono's Dear Girl: Stories (Japanese: 神谷浩史・小野大輔のDearGirl〜Stories〜, Hepburn: Kamiya Hiroshi, Ono Daisuke no Dear Girl: Stories; also known as Dear Girl: Stories) is a Japanese radio program hosted by voice actors Hiroshi Kamiya and Daisuke Ono. Dear Girl: Stories is broadcast via Nippon Cultural Broadcasting since 2007. The program later appeared on Radio Osaka and Chō! A&G+ beginning in 2008.

The popularity of Dear Girl: Stories has led to two manga adaptations, several audio drama CDs, a video game, and three films. In addition, for their 2014 film, Kamiya and Ono formed their own house band, Masochistic Ono Band, who later performed theme songs for the program.

== Discography ==
Kamiya and Ono released several music CDs throughout the run of Dear Girl: Stories, which were used as the opening and ending theme songs for Dear Girl: Stories. A total of two studio albums, one extended play, and ten singles were produced.

Kamiya and Ono also sold several CDs exclusively at events. "Shiny × Shiny" was sold at Dear Girl: Stories Festival Carnival Matsuri, which took place on September 19, 2013. "Ten-der Land" was sold at Dear Girl: Stories 10th Anniversary Expo 2016, which took place from June 25–26, 2016. "Taisetsu no Kagi" was sold at DGS VS MOB Live Survive, which took place in April 2018.

=== Studio albums ===
List of studio albums, with selected chart positions, sales figures and certifications
Title	Year	Album details	Peak chart positions	Sales
Title	Year	Album details	JPN	Sales
Stories	2011	Released: April 6, 2011; Label: Dwango User Entertainment; Formats: CD	12	—
Coin Toss Drive	2017	Released: March 15, 2017; Label: Dwango User Entertainment; Formats: CD	5	—
"—" denotes releases that did not chart or were not released in that region.

=== Extended plays ===
List of extended plays, with selected chart positions, sales figures and certifications
Title	Year	Album details	Peak chart positions	Sales
Title	Year	Album details	JPN	Sales
Dear Girl: Stories	2007	Released: December 19, 2007; Label: BinaryMixx Records; Formats: CD	110	—
"—" denotes releases that did not chart or were not released in that region.

=== Singles ===
List of singles, with selected chart positions, sales figures and certifications
Title	Year	Peak chart positions	Sales	Album
Title	Year	JPN	Sales	Album
"My Dear Girl!"	2009	15	—	Stories
"Netsuai S-O-S!" (熱愛S・O・S!)	2010	15	—	Stories
"Dear Girl wa Nemuranai" (Dear Girlは眠らない)	2010	13	—	Stories
"Smiley Time"	2011	12	—	Coin Toss Drive
"Boku-tachi Dake no Monogatari" (僕達だけの物語)	2012	16	—	Coin Toss Drive
"Glow My Way"	2013	14	—	Coin Toss Drive
"Monster's Show"	2015	7	JPN: 9,539	Coin Toss Drive
"On the Air"	2017	—	—	Non-album single
"Speedillusion"	2019	—	—	Non-album single
"Doyoubi no Kutsuoto" (土曜日の靴音)	2021	—	—	Non-album single
"Master Piece"	2022	—	—	Non-album single
"="	2023	—	—	Non-album single
"All Right!" (オーライ！！)	2024	—	—	Non-album single
"Theater Paradiso" (シアターパラディーゾ)	2025	—	—	Non-album single
"—" denotes releases that did not chart or were not released in that region.

=== Other songs ===
List of songs released independently at exclusive events
Title	Year	Album
"Shiny × Shiny"	2013	Coin Toss Drive
"Ten-der Land"	2016	Coin Toss Drive
"Taisetsu no Kagi" (タイセツの鍵)	2018	Non-album single
"—" denotes releases that did not chart or were not released in that region.

== Media ==
=== Manga ===
Two manga adaptations based on Dear Girl: Stories were serialized in the monthly magazine Sylph. The first adaptation was illustrated by Saya Iwasaki and titled Dear Girl: Stories Hibiki (Dear Girl〜Stories〜 響), which was serialized from March 23, 2009, to February 22, 2012. The second adaptation was illustrated by Ren Hidoh and titled Dear Girl: Stories Hizuki (Dear Girl〜Stories〜 緋月), which ran from November 22, 2012, to October 22, 2014. Both adaptations were released with 4 bound volumes each by ASCII Media Works under the Sylph Comics imprint.

==== Dear Girl Stories: Hibiki ====
No.	Japanese release date	Japanese ISBN
1	March 23, 2009	978-4-04-867786-8
2	January 22, 2010	978-4-04-868359-3
3	March 22, 2012	978-4-04-886501-2
4	April 21, 2012	978-4-04-886567-8

==== Dear Girl: Stories Hizuki ====
No.	Japanese release date	Japanese ISBN
1	May 22, 2013	978-4-04-891684-4
2	January 22, 2014	978-4-04-866188-1
3	June 21, 2014	978-4-04-866658-9
4	January 22, 2015	978-4-04-869195-6

=== Drama CDs ===
Several audio dramas based on the manga adaptations were released onto CD. Dear Girl: Stories Hibiki released three CDs total: the first CD was released on December 24, 2008, and peaked at #62 on the Oricon Weekly Albums Chart; the second CD was released on October 22, 2010; and the final CD was released on October 20, 2012. Dear Girl: Stories Hizuki had one audio drama CD, which was released on April 10, 2014.

In addition, several audio drama CDs were included as bonuses in several issues of Sylph, the magazine where both manga adaptations were serialized.

=== Video game ===
During the serialization of Dear Girl: Stories Hibiki, a visual novel dating sim game titled Dear Girl: Stories Hibiki: Hibiki Tokkun Daisakusen! for the Nintendo DS was released on December 17, 2009, in premium and regular editions. The game was published by ASCII Media Works and Saya Iwasaki, who illustrated the manga, provided the game's artwork.

=== Films ===
Three film adaptations based on Dear Girl: Stories were produced, with Kamiya and Ono portraying fictional versions of themselves. The first film, titled Dear Girl: Stories The Movie, was released in 2010 in three theaters in Tokyo, Nagoya, and Osaka but later screened in 26 theaters nationwide.

The second film, titled Dear Girl: Stories The Movie 2: Ace of Asia, was released on February 15, 2014. It was filmed in Hong Kong. It was released on DVD and Blu-ray on October 30, 2014.

The third film, titled Dear Girl: Stories The Movie 3: The United Kingdom of Kochi, was screened in two parts. The first part, titled Roku-nin no Ryūme-hen (六人の龍馬編), was screened in November 2017. The second part, titled Ao no Keshō-hen (蒼の継承編), was screened in January 2018. Both parts were bundled in a blu-ray and DVD set that was released on December 6, 2018.

== Awards ==
Year	Award	Category	Recipients	Result
2015	AniRadi Award	Best Male Radio	Hiroshi Kamiya and Daisuke Ono	Won
2015	AniRadi Award	Radio of the Year	Hiroshi Kamiya and Daisuke Ono	Won
