= Masochistic Ono Band =

Japanese rock band

- Origin: Japan
- Genre: Rock
- Years active: 2013–present
- Labels: U & R Records
- Members: Hiro-C; Ono-D; Do-S; 3M; Yagi84; Chanko
- Website: www.joqrextend.co.jp/mob/

Masochistic Ono Band (stylized as MASOCHISTIC ONO BAND) is a Japanese rock band. The band was formed in 2013 as the house band for the radio program Hiroshi Kamiya and Daisuke Ono's Dear Girl: Stories, with the members consisting of Hiroshi Kamiya, Daisuke Ono, and other staff members from the show.

== History ==
Voice actors Hiroshi Kamiya (known by the stage name Hiro-C) and Daisuke Ono (known by the stage name Ono-D) are hosts for the radio program Hiroshi Kamiya and Daisuke Ono's Dear Girl: Stories, which had been broadcasting on Nippon Cultural Broadcasting since 2007. They, along with other staff members of the show, formed the band Masochistic Ono Band. The four members recruited for their group consist of Dear Girl: Stories' writers Masaru Suwa (known by the stage name Do-S) and Yōhei Kobayashi (known by the stage name Chanko) as well as 3M and Yagi84. Masochistic Ono Band made their first appearance in February 2013 during a live event for Dear Girl: Stories, titled Dear Girl: Stories Festival Carnival Matsuri.

Masochistic Ono Band released their debut single, "Ace of Asia", on February 15, 2014, as the theme song to Dear Girl: Stories's second film, Dear Girl: Stories The Movie 2: Ace of Asia, which documented the group's trip in Hong Kong. The film was partly produced to record the music video for "Ace of Asia." On December 10, 2014, Masochistic Ono Band made their major label debut through their debut extended play, Masochistic Over Beat, which also consisted of their versions of "Dear wa Nemuranai", "Say Your Name! (Dear Girl)", and "Dirty Agent", songs that were originally recorded by Kamiya and Ono for Dear Girl: Stories. They embarked on their first live tour, titled What is Rock?, in 2015.

On February 8, 2018, Masochistic Ono Band released their second single, "Mighty Heart." From April 21 to 22, the group performed at DGS VS MOB Live Survive, a joint event with Dear Girl: Stories. After the event, the group briefly went on hiatus.

On June 9, 2020, Masochistic Ono Band returned from hiatus with the release of their second extended play, 6.9 (pronounced "Rock Tenkyū"). The extended play focused on the theme of "six", where each of the six members of the band composed one song, and it was released on Do-S's birthday, June 9. "Like a Fake", which was written by Hiro-C, was used as an opening song for Dear Girl: Stories. Masochistic Ono Band embarked on a nationwide tour titled Rock Thank You! from July to September 2020. One of the shows, titled Rock Thank You! Stay Home Stay Rock! Tour Final was livestreamed on YouTube and Niconico, on July 5, 2020. On the final day of the tour, Masochistic Ono Band announced that they are performing the theme song to the 2021 anime series Bonobono under the name Masochistic Bono Band.

== Members ==
- Hiro-C – vocals
- Ono-D – leader & vocals
- Do-S – bass guitar
- 3M – guitar
- Yagi84 – keyboard
- Chanko – drums

== Discography ==
=== Extended plays ===
List of extended plays, with selected chart positions, sales figures and certifications
| Title | Year | Album details | Peak chart positions | Sales |
| Title | Year | Album details | JPN | Sales |
|---|---|---|---|---|
| Masochistic Over Beat | 2014 | Released: December 10, 2014; Label: U & R Records; Formats: CD | 11 | — |
| 6.9 | 2020 | Released: June 9, 2020; Label: Nippon Cultural Broadcasting Extend; Formats: CD | — | — |
"—" denotes releases that did not chart or were not released in that region.

=== Singles ===
List of singles, with selected chart positions, sales figures and certifications
| Title | Year | Peak chart positions | Sales | Album |
| Title | Year | JPN | Sales | Album |
|---|---|---|---|---|
| "Ace of Asia" | 2014 | — | — | Masochistic Over Beat |
| "Mighty Heart" | 2018 | 20 | JPN: 5,000 | Non-album single |
"—" denotes releases that did not chart or were not released in that region.
