= Only the Ring Finger Knows =

Japanese light novel series

- Cover of the first novel - Only the Ring Finger Knows: The Lonely Finger

その指だけが知っている (Sono Yubi Dake ga Shitte Iru)
- Genre: School story
- Light novel
- Written by: Satoru Kannagi
- English publisher: NA: Digital Manga Publishing
- Original run: November 2002 – September 25, 2008
- Volumes: 5
- Manga
- Written by: Satoru Kannagi
- Illustrated by: Odagiri Hotaru
- Published by: Tokuma Shoten
- English publisher: NA: Digital Manga Publishing
- Published: 2002
- Volumes: 1

Only the Ring Finger Knows (Japanese: その指だけが知っている, Hepburn: Sono Yubi Dake ga Shitte Iru) is the title of a yaoi light novel series written by Satoru Kannagi. It was made into a manga illustrated by Hotaru Odagiri, which has been licensed in the United States by Digital Manga Publishing.

== Plot ==
In the school that Wataru Fujii attends, when people wear matching rings on their right middle finger it is a sign of friendship. A ring on the right ring finger means the person is single. When two people wear matching rings on the left ring finger, it means they are a couple.

One day Wataru accidentally switches rings with the very kind, handsome, popular senior, Yuichi Kazuki, because for some strange twist, their rings match. For reasons that Wataru doesn't understand, Yuichi becomes uncharacteristically mean to Wataru. After this strange incident, Wataru and Kazuki meet more often, usually by chance, starting an electric relationship around the matching rings. Wataru starts to wonder why Yuichi's mood towards him switches from sweet-teasing to evil—is it because he just can't stand him or is it because he actually loves him?

This meeting of two students who seem unlikely friends, leads to the birth of an unexpected secret that only the ring finger knows.

== Characters ==
=== In Manga and Novel ===
Wataru Fujii
The typical impulsive, brash high school student, with normal teenage problems. His life is turned upside down, however, after a fateful encounter with senior, Yuichi Kazuki who he finds wears a ring identical to his.

Yuichi Kazuki
A popular upperclassman, with a reputation of being a gentleman. He always gives a girl a proper let down. Generally seen as a kind person, his cutting remarks bewilder Wataru, whom he treats with contempt.

Karin Fujii
Wataru's younger sister. They look so much alike that people often mistake them as twins. She goes to an all-girls school and through strange circumstances, people think she and Yuichi have a relationship.

Kawamura
Wataru's classmate and class friend. He has a crush on Mai Tachibana, the hottest girl in their class and is slightly resentful of Yuichi for "stealing" her away.

Touko
Yuichi's older cousin. Toko runs a jewelry shop, Parfait, and was the person who made Yuichi's ring. She enjoys going places with Yuichi to "show him off".

Mai Tachibana
The hottest girl in the class. She has a big crush on Yuichi and rejected Kawamura because of it.

Takako Kazuki
Yuichi's little niece who comes to visit him on his birthday. She has a dog. She gets "engaged" to Wataru accidentally.

=== Only In Novel ===
Miho Ookusa
Pretty, popular first-year student who finds Wataru's ring and seems to show an interest in him. She is used to having guys notice her good looks and attempts to use her charm on Wataru, however he remains unaffected. To get his ring back, she tells Wataru that he must become friends with her, so they spend a large amount of time together and rumors about the two spread. It is later revealed that she stole Wataru's ring in the first place to cause him trouble because she had secretly been in love with Kazuki and had found out about their relationship. Kazuki later says, however, that although she might have once loved him she now liked Wataru.

Masanobu Asaka
He is Kazuki's rival and senior in college. He is very similar to Kazuki, in that both stand out for their looks and have similar mannerisms. Kazuki becomes jealous whenever he sees Asaka talking to Wataru and does not like Asaka. Wataru is oblivious to Asaka's feelings. Later on in the novel he falls deeply in love with Wataru resulting in making passes at Wataru when Yuichi isn't around. He has a brother who literally worships him. He also used to have a girlfriend by the name of Yuina but she died in a car accident. It mentions in the novel that Masnobu was deeply in love with but in the end they broke up. His broken ended up being broken by Wataru in the 4th novel of the series when he forcefully kissed Wataru which ends with Wataru saying that could not see each other anymore. In the end he ends up going to New York.

Shohei
Kazuki's older brother who doesn't approve of Wataru and Kazuki's relationship.

== Media ==
Only the Ring Finger Knows first began as a series of novels, and was later adapted into a manga.

=== Novels ===
In conjunction with Digital Manga Publishing, five paperback novels are planned to be released based on the series:

1. Only the Ring Finger Knows: The Lonely Ring Finger: Released March 2006
2. Only the Ring Finger Knows: The Left Hand Dreams of Him: Released July 2006
3. Only the Ring Finger Knows: The Ring Finger Falls Silent: Released October 2006
4. Only the Ring Finger Knows: The Ring Will Confess His Love: Released June 10, 2009
5. Only the Ring Finger Knows: The Finger Never Sleeps: Released August 29, 2012

The Japanese version of volume 5 was published on September 27, 2008, which is the final volume. The English version was released on August 29, 2012.

=== Manga ===
The manga version written by Satoru Kannagi and illustrated by Hotaru Odagiri only contains one volume and was published by Tokuma Shoten in Japan. The manga is now licensed by Digital Manga Publishing.

=== Drama CD ===
Only the Ring Finger Knows also has 4 volumes of Drama CDs to date, the first 3 based on the first part of each of the three novels, while the fourth drama is based on the second half of the third novel.

Cast:

- Suzumura Kenichi as Fujii Wataru
- Sakurai Takahiro as Kazuki Yuichi
- Kamiya Hiroshi as Asaka Masanobu
- Konishi Katsuyuki as Kazuki Shohei

== Reception ==
As of mid-2005, the English-language edition of the manga was in its third printing, with sales of over 12,000 copies.
