= Miracle Train: Ōedo-sen e Yōkoso =

Japanese anime television series

ミラクル☆トレイン～大江戸線へようこそ～
- Anime television series
- Directed by: Kenichi Kasai
- Produced by: Aniplex, TV Tokyo, Dax Production
- Music by: Tatsuya Kato
- Studio: Yumeta Company
- Original network: TV Tokyo, TVA, TVO, AT-X
- Original run: October 4, 2009 – December 27, 2009
- Episodes: 13

Miracle Train: Ōedo sen e Yōkoso (ミラクル☆トレイン～大江戸線へようこそ～, Miracle Train: Welcome to the Oedo Line) is a Japanese anime series directed by Kenichi Kasai and with original illustrations by Tomohisa Kai while Aki Tsunaki adapted the designs to illustrations. The series was produced by Yumeta Company with additional production through Aniplex, Dax Production, and TV Tokyo. The series was meant to introduce some of the facts and general knowledge about the train stations on Toei Ōedo Line. It ran for thirteen episodes between October 4, 2009, until December 27, 2009.

== Characters ==
=== Miracle Train Employees ===
Ropongi Fumi (六本木史, Fumi Roppongi)
He is the representation of Roppongi Station, which starts the Oedo Line. Roppongi Station is numbered E23. He has red-brown hair and blue eyes. He is a kind, calm mature person who is capable of seeing what troubles someone, as shown in episodes 1 and 2 where he was able to catch onto the fact that both customers had something bothering them beside what they said. He is considered boring because he tends to talk less often than the other stations and has a quiet, slightly shy but friendly demeanor. He is particularly good with computers and often writes reports on their customers and how they helped them. His catchphrase, which he often uses to reassure his fellow train stations is "Don't worry".
Ryogoku Itsumi (Itsumi Ryogoku)
He is the representation of Ryogoku Station, numbered E12. He has purple eyes and orange hair. He is hot blooded, loud, friendly and enjoys watching historical dramas. He is obsessed with Japanese history in general.
Izayoi Tsukishima (月島十六夜, Tsukishima Izayoi)
He is the representation of Tsukishima Station, numbered E16. He has green hair and brown eyes. He is conservative, traditional, and loves traditional Japanese culture and food. He is also good at fishing and is particularly fond of monjayaki (or monja for short), which is a type of Japanese fried batter with various ingredients inside.
Shinjuku Rintarou (新宿凛太郎, Rintaro Shinjuku)
He is the representation of Shinjuku station, numbered E27. He has dusty brown hair and purple eyes and is flirtatious. He looks like a host or model and can be narcissistic but mature. He has three brothers. He prefers women and at one point in episode 9 even initially refused to help out Keita because he was male. Despite this, he does care for his fellow train stations.
Tochō Saki (都庁前, Saki Tochō)
He is the representation of Tochōmae station numbered E28. He wears glasses and has black hair and red eyes. He is the leader of the train stations and considered the most serious and enjoys police dramas. He helps the most passengers with their problems. He is considerate, responsible, loves order and hates when things do not go as scheduled. The others have commented he would make a great father someday. He hates thrill rides and is very knowledgeable about various facts, including trains. He is self conscious about his forehead and how big it is.
Shiodome Iku (汐留行, Iku Shiodome)
He is the representation of Shiodome Station, numbered E19. He is the youngest (his train station having been opened most recently) He has blond hair and blue eyes and also wears blue earrings. He knows a lot about trains and is considered cute but lacking in tact because of his youth and inexperience. He loves cute things and is knowledgeable about tea.
Akari (あかり, Akari)
The tour guide of the Miracle Train. She ironically tends to get lost on the train. She has the appearance of a young girl with long red hair and wears a pink conductor outfit. It is revealed in the last two episodes that she is actually a normal human that once went to Roppongi station when she was young and separated from her class group. She saw Fumi Roppongi collapsed near the train and took him inside, accidentally becoming part of the Miracle Train group. Because her presence is an abnormality, she is forced to leave the Miracle Train, going back in time and living her life properly. She does, however, retain her memories of her life on the Miracle Train and at the end of the episode reunites with Roppongi as an adult. It is implied she and Roppogi have feelings for each other.
Shasho (車掌, Shasho)
The conductor of the train who is never given a proper name. He is an enigmatic figure who guides where the Miracle Train is headed and who boards it. He wears a mask that hides his face and seems to know more than he lets on.
Tokugawa (徳川, Tokugawa)
The pet dog of the stations. While he cannot talk, he has the same intelligence as that of a human. He often seems annoyed at the antics of the train stations and often has biting, sarcastic remarks about their many antics and actions.

=== Passengers ===
Chinatsu (千夏)
She is the passenger shown in episode 1. She boards Miracle Train and is assisted mainly by the Roppongi. She initially seeks help searching for her lost dog Kotaro but admits her real problem is that she just started high school but her friends went to other schools and she is not good at meeting new people and can not make friends. After hearing someone mention a girl was gloomy, even though she wasn't sure it was her she became scared to go to school and felt the only person who understood her was her dog. Eventually, through talking with Roppongi, she decides to change herself.
Mai (マイ)
She is the passenger shown in episode 2 mainly helped by Tocho. She boards Miracle Train after deciding to quit her job at her firm because they want to transfer her overseas at the U.S. but she did not want to, causing her boyfriend who did not want a long distance relationship to also break up with her. Tocho gives her the courage to go through with it, saying she will meet new people and make new memories.
Michi (道)
She is the passenger shown in episode 3 and is assisted mainly by Shinjuku. She intended to go to an omiai despite her young age as she prefers to live her life scheduled and hates trains because her parents met on a train and as a result are obsessed with them and even named her after a train but Shinjuku teaches her to relax and live life to the fullest while learning to love trains as a result.
Mirai (ミライ)
She is the passenger in episode 4 mainly helped by Ryogoku. She is a fortune teller mainly specialized in palm reading but has tried to learn other forms of fortune telling to help others. She initially did not want to state her problem because she believed that as a fortune teller she should listen to other people's problems and help them and should not receive help for herself. She got into a fight with her friend since high school (for nine years) and fortune telling coworker Asuka regarding how to run their fortune teller shop "tomorrow's Future" as Asuka wanted to expand their business but Mirai claims to no longer wants to handle fortune telling. Ryogoku helps remind her of why she wanted to fortune tell and she tells Asuka she just wants to do three people at a time but understands why Asuka wants to expand their business. The two ultimately separate their business but reconcile.
Noriko (典子)
She is the passenger in episode 5 mainly helped by Shiodome. A train maniac who competes with her male friend to see who knows more but admits later in what she was really interested in was not the trains but her friend and wanted his attention so pretended to like trains. Shiodome develops a crush on her but she politely rejects him.
Himeno (姫野)
She is the passenger in episode 6 mainly helped by Tsukushima. She is the daughter of a wealthy CEO but grew tired of being restrained and tried to run away to experience life away from her home if even for one day.
Airi (愛理)
She is the passenger in episode 8 mainly helped by Tocho (with a little help from Toshiamen and Roppongi). She is a young runaway girl looking for her lost father, who happens to look like Tocho. She decides to go to the amusement park where her father promised to take her. She eventually comes to terms with the fact he has died but promises to marry Tocho in the future, having developed a crush on him.
Keita Sakuraba (桜庭ケイタ, Sakuraba Keita)
He is the passenger in episode 9 helped by everyone. He is the only known male passenger to board the Miracle Train, which usually only serves female passengers. This is because while the Miracle Train acknowledged the female passenger who was supposed to board the train, the male passenger behind touched in so fast and was unintentionally acknowledged as well. He is effeminate and loves cute things but tries to change that about himself because he believes his girlfriend whom he wants to marry fell in love with the manly hard working person he is at their workplace but the train stations help him realize it is better to be himself. He eventually confesses his love for cute things to his girlfriend who accepts him for who he is and the two have plans to marry.
Makoto Kogure (小暮誠, Kogure Makoto)
She is the passenger in episode 10 helped mainly by Tocho. She appears in Tocho's favorite police dramas but has grown tired of the role. Eventually, Tocho helps her rekindle her love for the role.
Mayu (まゆ)
She is the passenger in episode 11 helped by everyone. She is a ghost who died in a hit and run when she crossed the street to try to grab a child's balloon for the child. She is a kind person but tends to get distracted helping people. She wanted to meet her beloved one last time on her death anniversary to help him move on.

=== Minor characters ===
Nishi-Shinjuku-Gochome Fuku (西新宿五丁目福, Fuku Nishi-Shinjuku- Gochome)
A part of the Shinjuku Station labeled E29. His place is the only one that has Shimizu Bridge printed on the ticket.
Higashi Shinjuku Reiji (東新宿玲二, Reiji Higashi-Shinjuku)
A part of the Shinjuku Station labeled E02. His place has good restaurants.
Shinjuku-Nishiguchi Hajime (新宿西口肇, Hajime Shinjuku-Nishiguchi)
A part of the Shinjuku station labeled E01. He is a wide open station with the theme of light.
Toshimaen Saburo (豊島園三郎, Saburo Toshimaen)
A train station labeled E36. He is kind, very knowledgeable, and observant. He has short brown hair and green eyes. He is considered a senpai for the main train stations since he opened in 1927.
Iidabashi Remu (飯田橋レム, Remu Iidabashi)
A train station labeled E6. He has long brown hair tied in a ponytail and wears glasses. He has a serious face but actually tends to make bad jokes. He has children and cooks but it is unknown who he had children with. He wears a lab coat and talks like a scientist.

=== Anime ===
The anime television series is produced by Yumeta Company and directed by Kenichi Kasai with scripts from Keiichirou Daichi, Natsuko Takahashi, Yoichi Kato, and Yuka Yamada and character designs by Aki Tsunaki (Tomohisa Kai did the original character designs). The opening theme is "Montage" by Kenn, Ryotaro Okiayu, Yuki Kaji, and Masakazu Morita while the ending theme was "Stories" by Shuhei Kita. The anime ran from October 4, 2009, until December 27, 2009.

==== Miracle Train Episode List ====
No.	Title	Original release date
1	"Labyrinth 42.3"; Transliteration: "Rabirinsu 42.3" (Japanese: ラビリンス42.3)	October 4, 2009
A young girl named Chisato decides to board the train, only for her dog to run away. She ends up on the Miracle Train, a train known to present itself to young women in trouble. The train includes the physical manifestations of the six major train stations on the Oedo Line. The train stations decide to help Chisato find her dog Kotaro. However, Roppongi notices that her real problem is her inability to make friends and gives her some advice.
2	"A Passport for You"; Transliteration: "Pasupōto wo Anata ni" (Japanese: パスポートをあなたに)	October 11, 2009
Mai, a young woman working at a firm, decides she wants to quit the firm because they want to transfer her to America against her will. She ends up on the Miracle Train, albeit quite late as the group cook monja and relax while waiting for her. She claims to have already solved her problem, but Tocho takes her around his station and learns the real reason behind her problem is that her boyfriend broke up with her because he did not want a long distance relationship, causing her to question what she was working for. While she went to Tocho station to get a passport, she decided against it. Tocho helps her realize it is alright to move forward and to go to America to make new memories.
3	"130000 people start traveling" Transliteration: "Juusanmannin no Tabidachi"	October 18, 2009
Michi has just attempted to go to a marriage interview meeting only to be declined because she is 14. She ends up on the Miracle Train and explains she hates trains and wants to organize her life because her parents met and fell in love on a train and are disorganized, a life she does not appreciate. However, Shinjuku and his three brothers decide to make it the best day of her life by taking her around Shinjuku. She reveals she hates trains because her parents loved them and enjoy traveling, living life without a schedule. Shinjuku shows her a vision of her past where her parents explain that there will be tough and fun journeys that might not go according to plan but as long as there is a way to continue the journey the path will continue forever. She eventually learns to loosen up and grows to appreciate trains.
4	"Departing from the Future, Going to the Past"; Transliteration: "Mirai Hatsu Kako Iki" (Japanese: 未来発 過去行き)	October 25, 2009
Ryogoku notices a young woman hiding from her friend and she ends up boarding the Miracle Train. Her name is Mirai and she is a fortune teller and tells the train stations their fortunes but initially refuses to state her problem because she believes as a fortune teller she must listen to other people's problems but not trouble others with her own. Ryogoku decides to take her around his town, explaining various facts about the sites. She admits that she runs a small fortune telling shop called "Tomorrow's Future" with her friend of nine years Asuka and Asuka wants to expand the business. However, she claims to no longer want to fortune tell. He tells her to start looking at the past in order to look towards her future. She remembers when Asuka felt good with her fortune telling and why she started. The two decide to separate their business but reconcile.
5	"Love's Mile Marker Zero"; Transliteration: "Koi no Mairu Mākā Zero" (Japanese: 恋の0哩標識（マイル・マーカー・ゼロ）)	November 1, 2009
6	"Railway from Tsukishima"; Transliteration: "Rēruwei Furomu Tsukishima" (Japanese: レールウェイ フロム 月島)	November 8, 2009
7	"Ooedo Mystery Train"; Transliteration: "Ōedo Misuterī ☆ Torein" (Japanese: 大江戸ミステリー☆トレイン)	November 15, 2009
8	"Tiny Customer"; Transliteration: "Chiisana Okyakusama" (Japanese: 小さなお客様)	November 22, 2009
Airi, a young child, has runaway from home in search of her lost father and has ended up on the Miracle Train. She confuses Tocho to be her real father, prompting everyone to call her his secret love child, much to his annoyance and confusion. He decides to take it upon himself to figure out what happened to her real father. They meet up with Saburo Toshimaen, representation of Toshimaen station, who ends up taking them to an amusement park. Tocho learns her father died and her mother has been neglecting her, mourning his death. Tocho comforts her until her mother comes and apologizes. Tocho reassures Airi of her mother's love and explains to Airi's mother what happened. Airi and her mother leave and Airi says one day she will be Tocho's bride.
9	"The Men's Miracle Train"; Transliteration: "Otoko-tachi no Mirakuru ☆ Torein" (Japanese: 男たちのミラクル☆トレイン)	November 29, 2009
Keita Sakaraba accidentally boards the train in place of the intended passenger. The train stations decide to help him with his problem which, as it turns out, is his love for cute things. He wishes he did not love cute things because his girlfriend fell in love with him as the manly hardworking person at their trading company where they work. The other train stations switch identities with Tocho pretending to be Tsukushima, Tsukushima pretending to be Roppongi, Shinjuku pretending to be Tocho, Shiodome pretending to be Shinjuku, Ryogoku pretending to be Shiodome, and Roppongi pretending to be Ryogoku. The stations show how pretending to be somewhat you are not is painful, but Keita decides to change himself completely. The train stations end up at his room where they try to convert it to be more manly but he realizes that taking away his love for cute things would make him empty so he accepts himself and reveals his love of cute things to his girlfriend, who accepts him for who he is and the two plan to marry. Keita thanks the train station and leaves.
10	"Bark at the Oedo Line!"; Transliteration: "Ōedo-sen ni Hoero!" (Japanese: 大江戸線にほえろ！)	December 6, 2009
11	"The Proposal from 3 Years Ago"; Transliteration: "Sannengo no Puropōzu" (Japanese: 3年後のプロポーズ)	December 13, 2009
12	"Another Passenger"; Transliteration: "Mō Hitori no Jōkyaku" (Japanese: もうひとりの乗客)	December 20, 2009
13	"The Miracle of the Holy Night"; Transliteration: "Seiya no Kiseki" (Japanese: 聖夜の奇跡)	December 27, 2009
Akari is forced to leave the Miracle Train in order to prevent it from falling apart.

== Reception ==
Erin Finnegan at Anime News Network describes the show as a guilty pleasure.
