= Mobile Suit Gundam: MS Sensen 0079 =

2007 video game

- Developer: BEC
- Publisher: Namco Bandai Games
- Platform: Wii
- Release: JP: July 26, 2007
- Genres: First-person shooter, Mecha simulation
- Modes: Single-player, Multiplayer

Mobile Suit Gundam: MS Sensen 0079 is a Wii title, published and developed by Namco Bandai, based on Sunrise's Mobile Suit Gundam franchise. Its Japanese release was July 26, 2007.

== Game System ==
=== Mobile Suits ===
Each faction has their own models, or types, of Mobile Suit. Each has its own speciality and purpose. The two warring forces described in game are the E.F.F (Earth Federation Forces) and The Principality of Zeon. Many Mobile Suits that make an appearance in this game are from the very first Gundam series. During gameplay, it is possible to customize mobile suits ranging from color to weapons.

=== Controls ===
As with other shooter games on the system (such as Red Steel), the Wii remote is used to aim/shoot, while the nunchuk's control stick is used to move around. Pressing A while over a weapon or supply highlighted will pick up said item.

The Z button is used to jump/dash while the C button is used to lock-on to nearest enemy. The B button on the remote shoots the weapon on hand, and the minus button switched between weapons.

Holding the A button goes into melee mode when within range. This will draw your mobile suit's melee weapon. Swinging the remote vertically and horizontally attacks. A+B will enable 'blocking' when in melee range.

Along with the shooter element, you also fight alongside up to two AI-controlled allies. Pressing the "1" button switches between nine different squad formations.

=== Storyline ===
The story in this game follows the events that take place during the Universal Century, in the year 0079, covering the conflict of the original Mobile Suit Gundam anime, from the perspective of two teams of rookie Mobile Suit pilots: the Earth Federation's SRT Unit 1 and the Principality of Zeon's Blaugher Team.

There is also an ace pilot mode where the player controls famous characters from the Universal Century, such as Amuro Ray and Char Aznable.
