= Nara Prefecture =

Prefecture of Japan

Coordinates: 34°34′N 135°46′E

Nara Prefecture 奈良県
- Prefecture

Japanese transcription(s)
  - Japanese: 奈良県
  - Rōmaji: Nara-ken
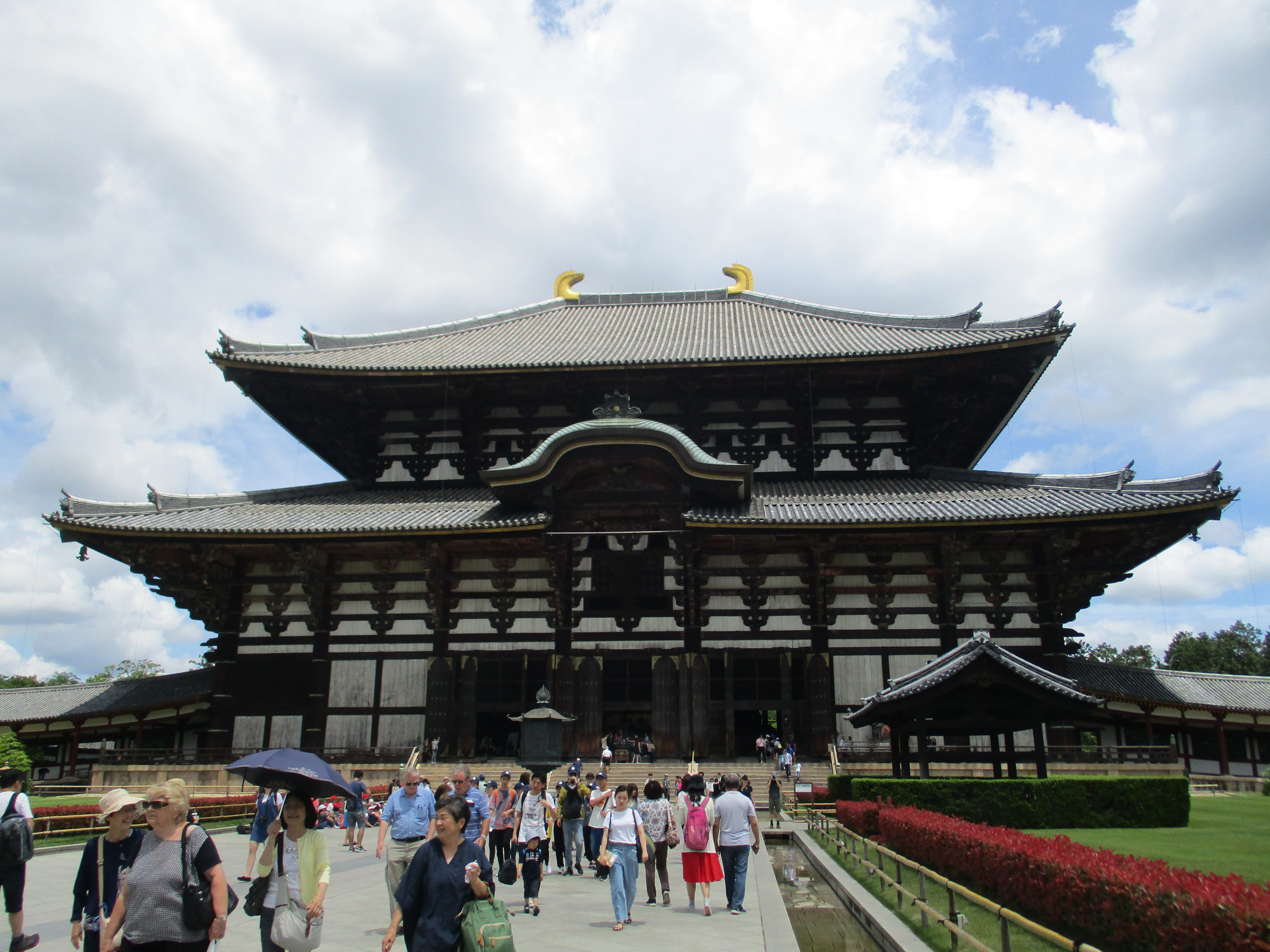
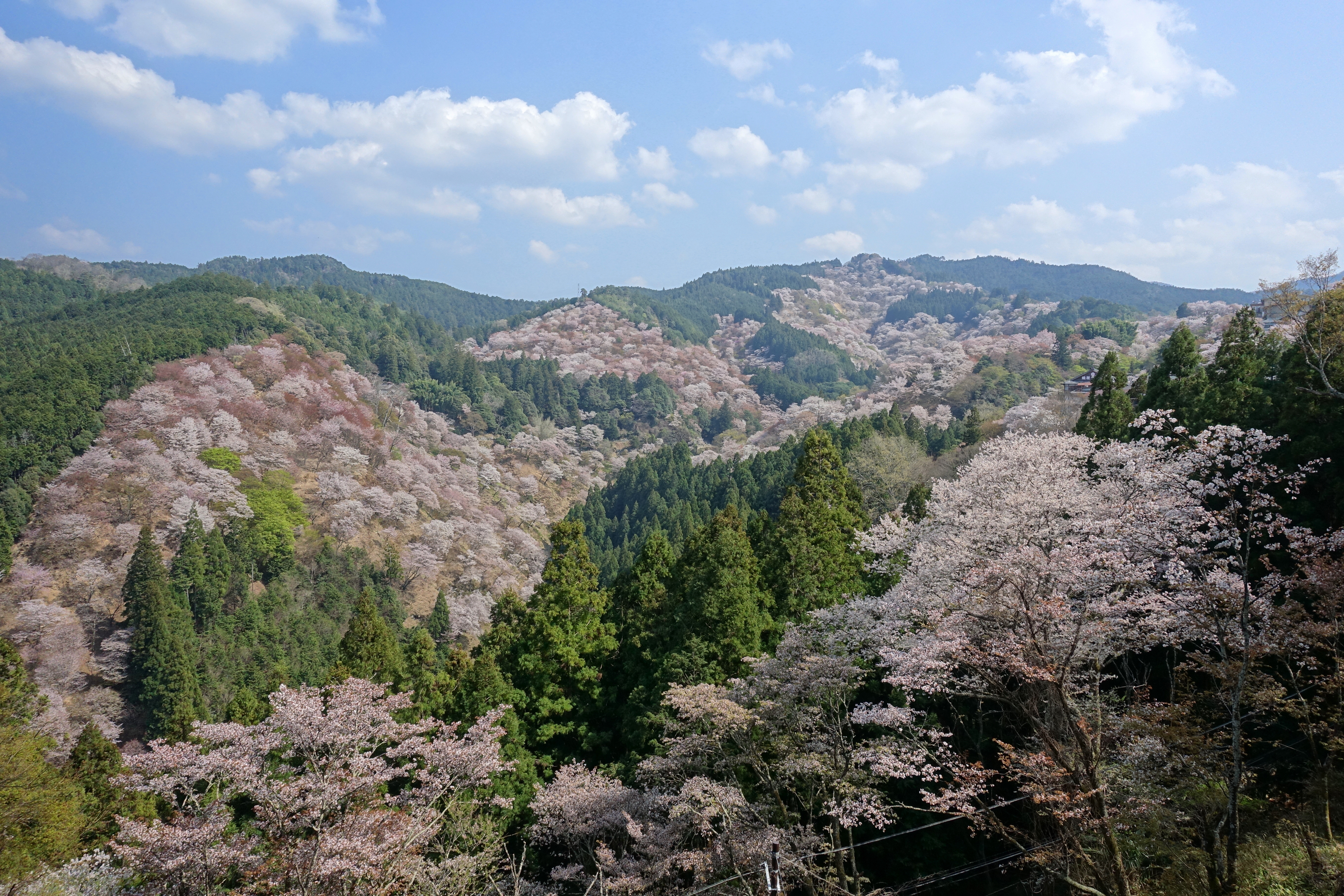
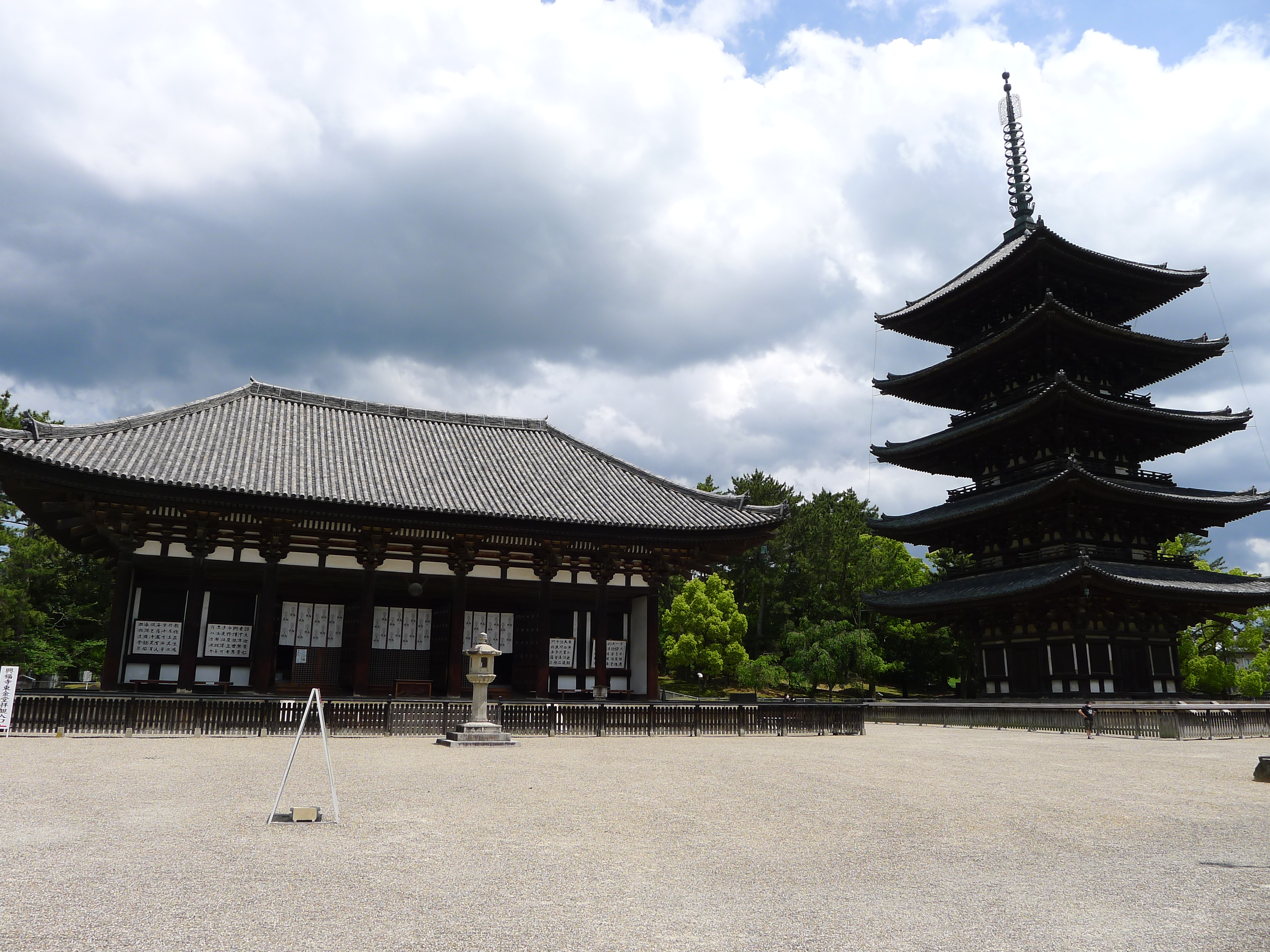
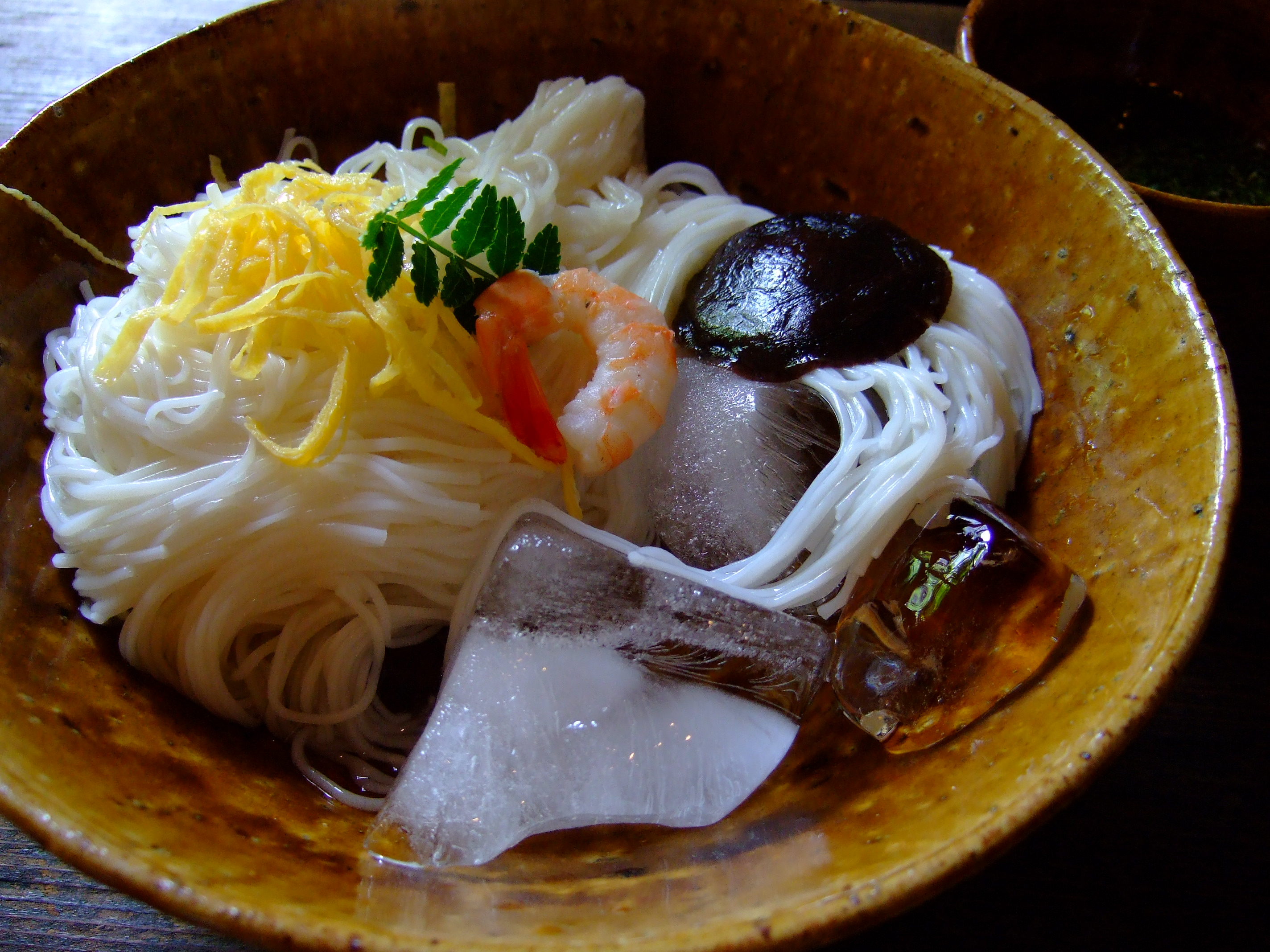
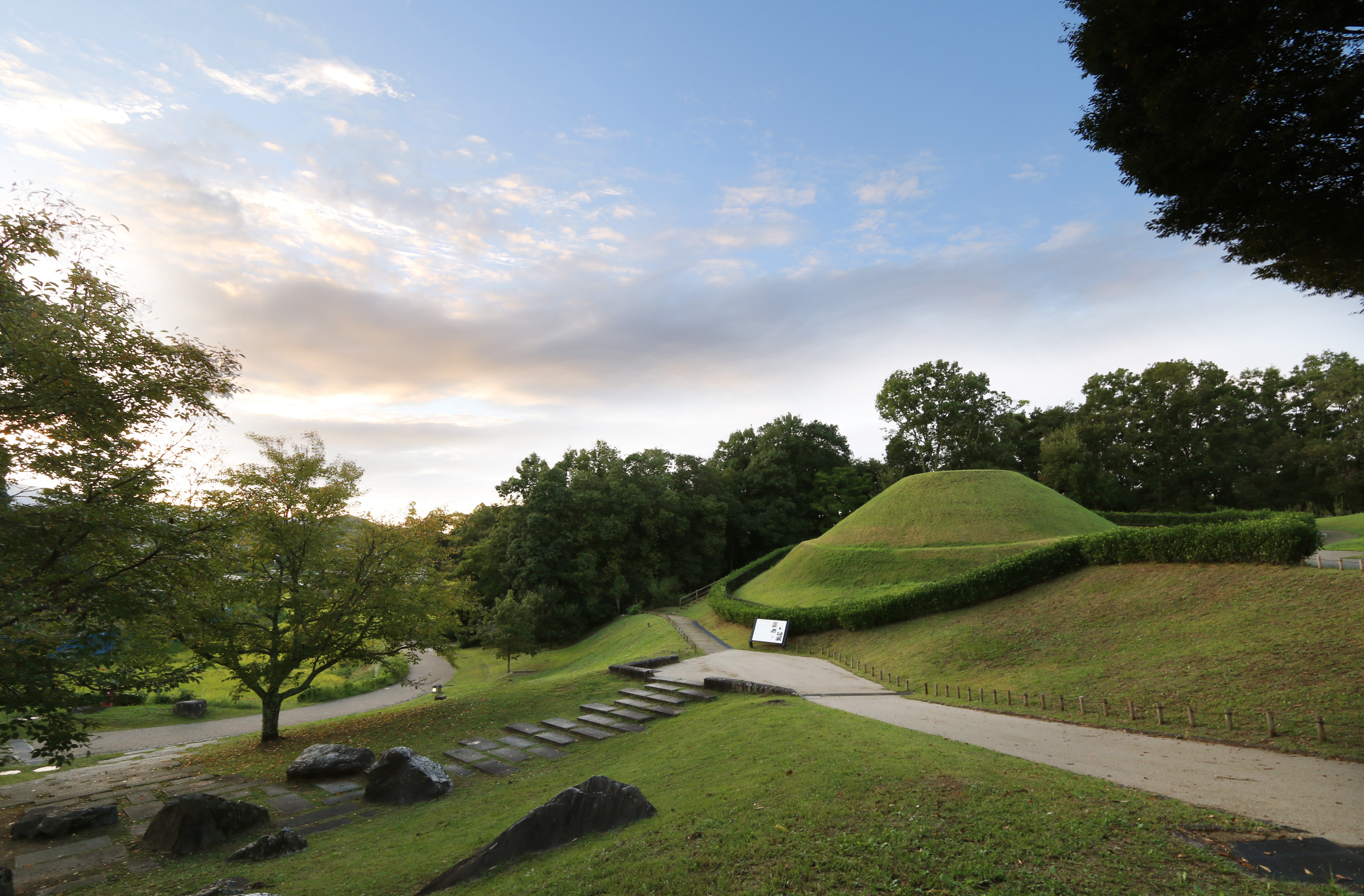
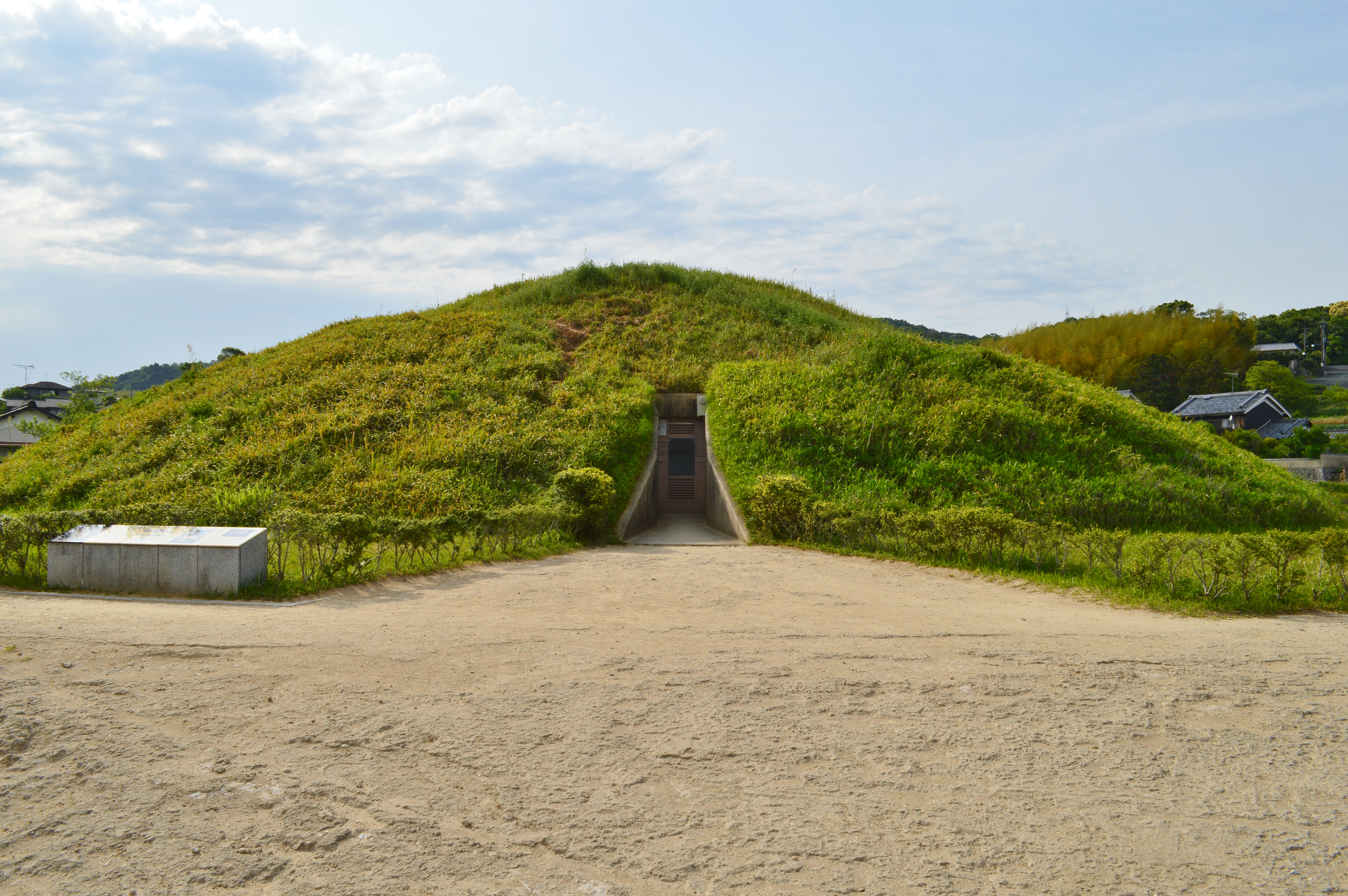
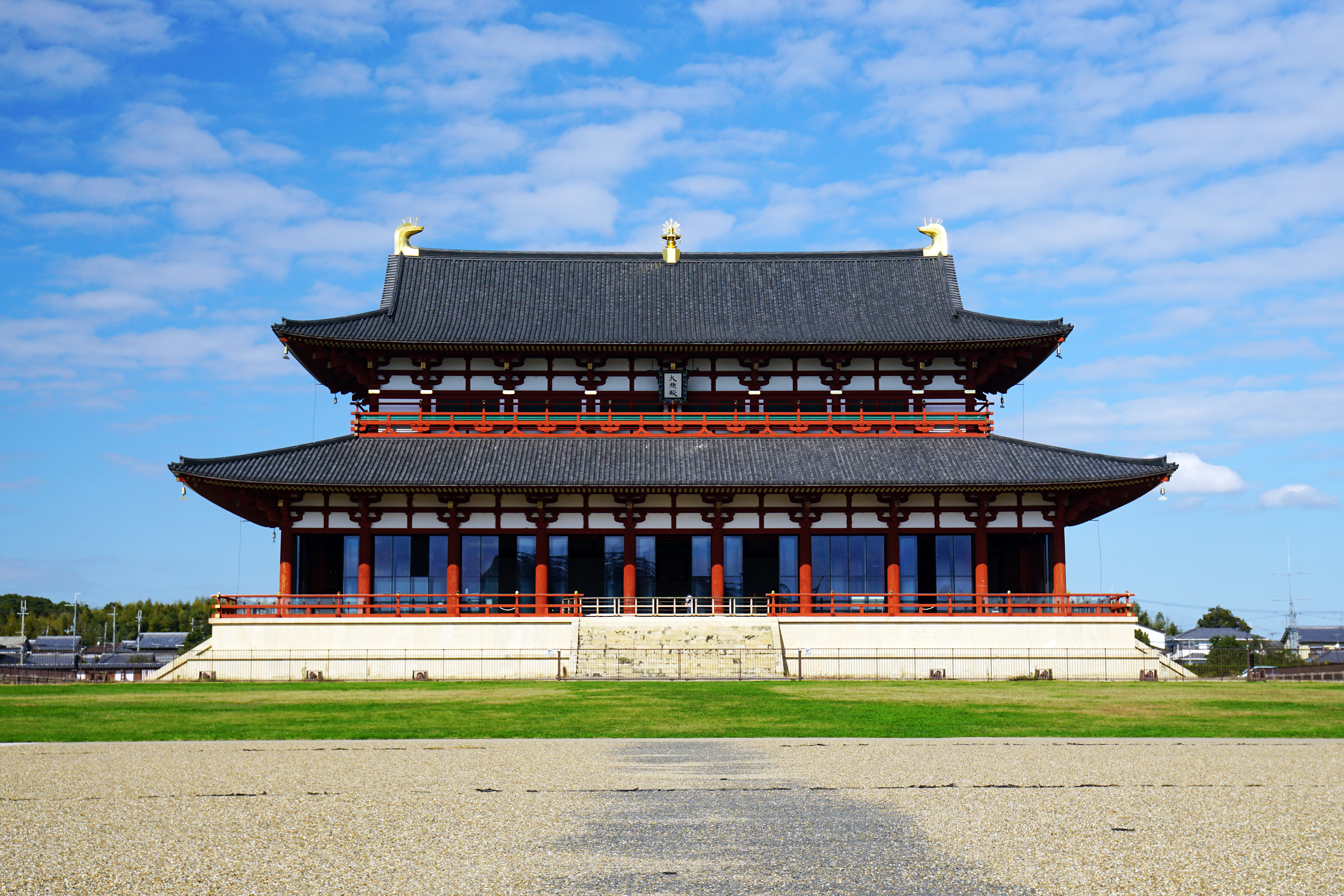
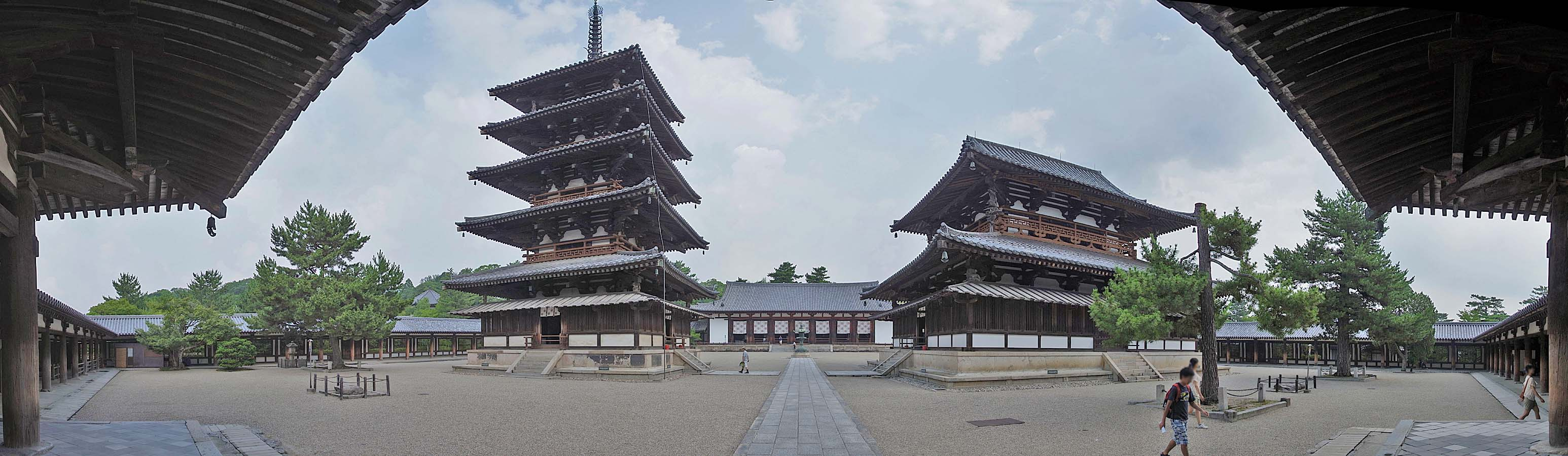
- Tōdai-ji Cherry blossoms on Mount Yoshino Kōfuku-ji Miwa Sōmen Takamatsuzuka Tomb Fujinoki Tomb Daigokuden in Heijyō Palace Hōryū-ji

- Flag Symbol
- Anthem: Nara kenmin no uta
- Country: Japan
- Region: Kansai
- Island: Honshu
- Capital: Nara
- Subdivisions: Districts: 7, Municipalities: 39

Government
  - Governor: Makoto Yamashita

Area
  - Total: 3,691.09 km^{2} (1,425.14 sq mi)
  - Rank: 40th

Population (1 October 2024)
  - Total: 1,250,000
  - Rank: 31th
  - Density: 347/km^{2} (900/sq mi)
  - Dialects: Nara・Okuyoshino

GDP
  - Total: JP¥3,921 billion US$28.9 billion (2022)
- ISO 3166 code: JP-29
- Website: www.pref.nara.jp
- Symbols of Japan
- Bird: Japanese robin (Erithacus akahige)
- Fish: Goldfish (Carassius auratus auratus); Ayu (Plecoglossus altivelis altivelis); Amago (Oncorhynchus masou ishikawae)
- Flower: Nara yae zakura (Prunus verecunda cultivar)
- Tree: Sugi (Cryptomeria japonica)

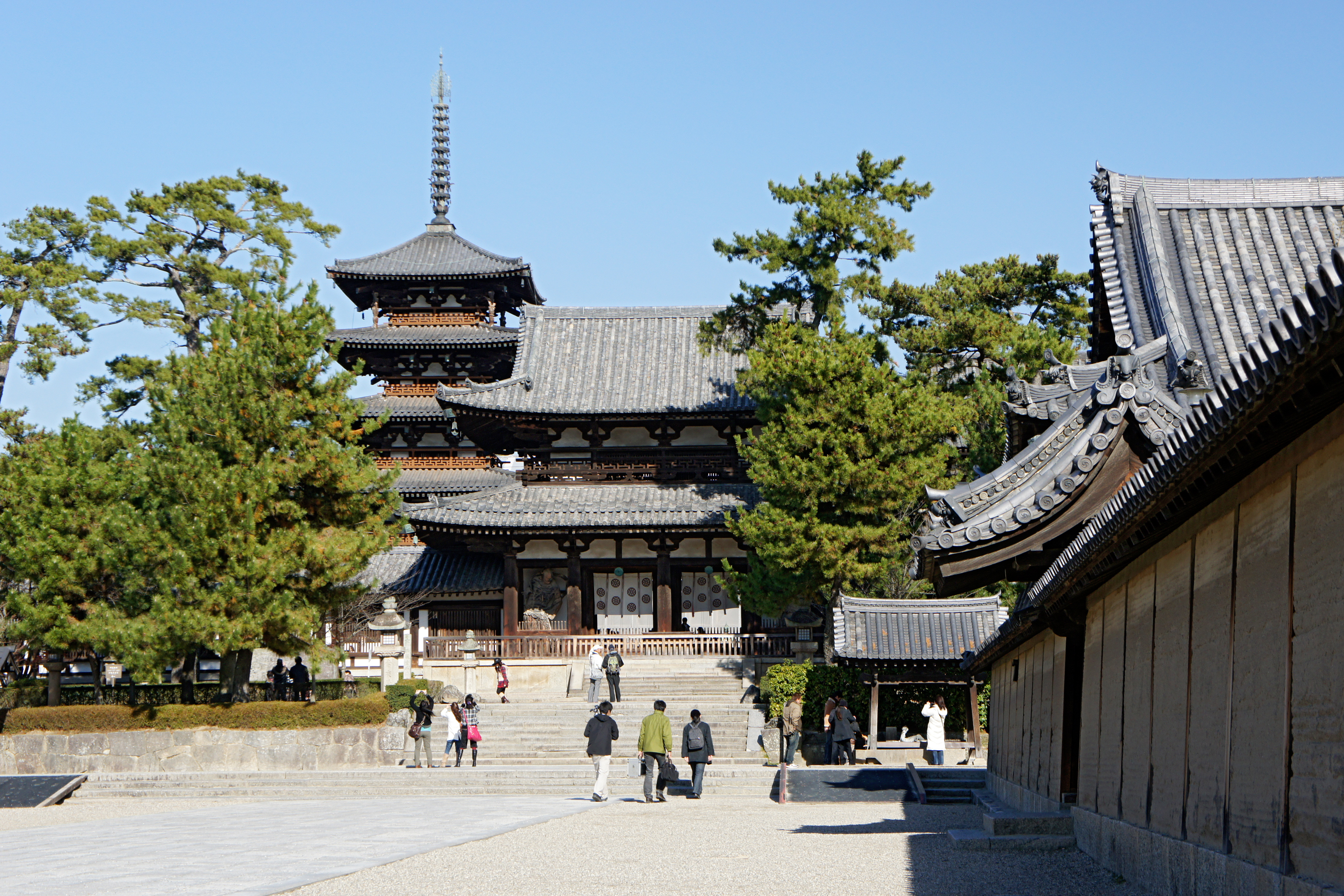
Hōryū-ji, a World Heritage Site in Ikaruga Town, Ikoma District, Nara Prefecture

Nara Prefecture (奈良県, Nara-ken; Japanese pronunciation: [nä́.ɾä̀, nä̀.ɾä́.kè̞ɴ̀]) is an inland prefecture of Japan located in the Kansai region of Honshu. As of 2020, Nara Prefecture has a population of 1,321,805 and has a geographic area of 3,691 square kilometres (1,425 sq mi). Nara Prefecture borders Kyoto Prefecture to the north, Osaka Prefecture to the northwest, Wakayama Prefecture to the southwest, and Mie Prefecture to the east.

Nara is the capital and largest city of Nara Prefecture, with other major cities including Kashihara, Ikoma, and Yamatokōriyama. Nara Prefecture is located in the center of the Kii Peninsula on Japan's Pacific Ocean coast, and is one of only eight inland prefectures. Nara Prefecture has the distinction of having more UNESCO World Heritage listings than any other prefecture in Japan.

== History ==
The Nara Prefecture region is considered one of the oldest regions in Japan, having been settled for thousands of years, and is widely viewed as the Japanese cradle of civilization. Like Kyoto, Nara was one of Imperial Japan's earliest capital cities. The current form of Nara Prefecture was officially created in 1887, when it became independent of Osaka Prefecture.

Historically, Nara Prefecture was also known as Yamato-no-kuni or Yamato Province.

=== Up to Nara period ===
From the third century to the fourth century, a poorly documented political force existed at the foot of Mount Miwa, east of Nara Basin. It sought unification of most parts in Japan. Since the historical beginning of Japan, Yamato was its political center.

Ancient capitals of Japan were built on the land of Nara, namely Asuka-kyō, Fujiwara-kyō (694–710) and Heijō-kyō (most of 710–784). The capital cities of Fujiwara and Heijō are believed to have been modeled after Chinese capitals at the time, incorporating grid layout patterns. The royal court also established relations with Sui and then Tang dynasty China and sent students to the Middle Kingdom to learn high civilization. By the 7th century, Nara accepted the many immigrants, including refugees of Baekje who had escaped from war disturbances of the southern part of the Korean Peninsula. The first high civilization with royal patronage of Buddhism flourished in today's Nara city (710–784 AD).

=== Nara in the Heian period ===
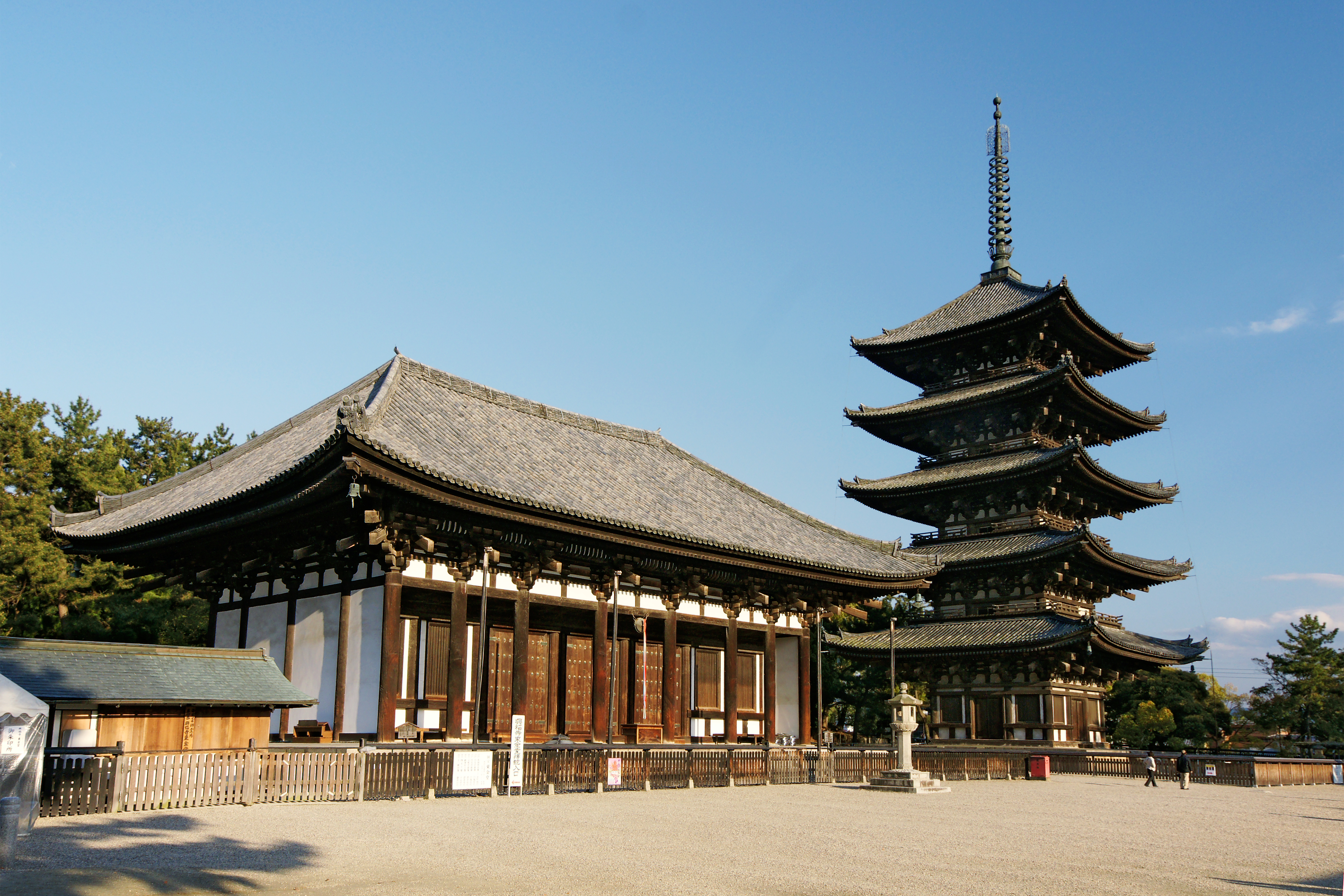
Kōfuku-ji

In 784, Emperor Kanmu decided to relocate the capital to Nagaoka-kyō in Yamashiro Province, followed by another move in 794 to Heian-kyō, marking the start of the Heian period. The temples in Nara remained powerful beyond the move of the political capital, thus giving Nara a synonym of "Nanto" (meaning "South Capital") as opposed to Heian-kyō, situated in the north. Close to the end of Heian period, Taira no Shigehira, a son of Taira no Kiyomori, was ordered by his father to depress the power of various parties, mainly Kōfuku-ji and Tōdai-ji, who were backing up an opposition group headed by Prince Mochihito. The movement led to a collision between the Taira and the Nara temples in 1180. This clash eventually led to Kōfuku-ji and Tōdai-ji being set on fire, resulting in vast destruction of architectural heritage.

=== Medieval Nara ===
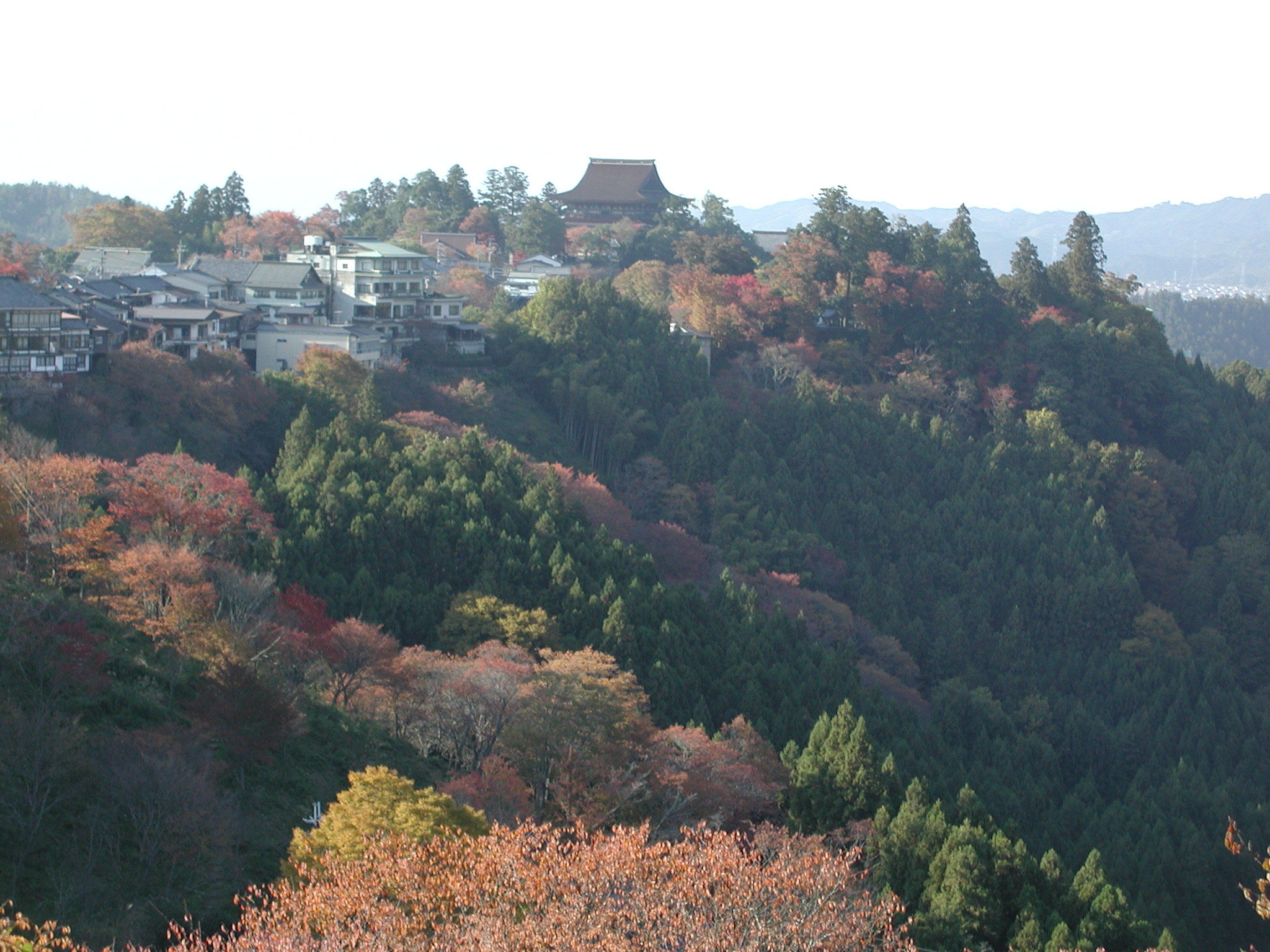
The red autumn leaves in Yoshino

At the rise of the Minamoto to its ruling seat and the opening of Kamakura shogunate, Nara enjoyed the support of Minamoto no Yoritomo toward restoration. Kōfuku-ji, being the "home temple" to the Fujiwara since its foundation, not only regained the power it had before but became a de facto regional chief of Yamato Province. With the reconstruction of Kōfuku-ji and Tōdai-ji, a town was growing again near the two temples.

The Nanboku-chō period, starting in 1336, brought more instability to Nara. As Emperor Go-Daigo chose Yoshino as his base, a power struggle arose in Kōfuku-ji with a group supporting the South and another siding the North court. Likewise, local clans were split into two. Kōfuku-ji recovered its control over the province for a short time at the surrender of the South Court in 1392, while the internal power game of the temple itself opened a way for the local samurai clans to spring up and fight with each other, gradually acquiring their own territories, thus diminishing the influence of Kōfuku-ji overall.

=== The Sengoku and Edo periods ===
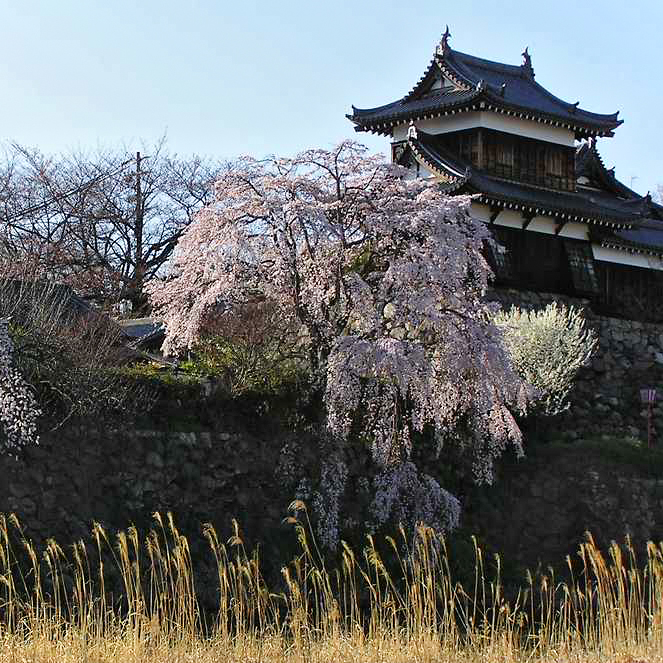
The restored turret of Kōriyama Castle

Later, the whole province of Yamato got drawn into the confusion of the Sengoku period. Tōdai-ji was once again set on fire in 1567, when Matsunaga Hisahide, who was later appointed by Oda Nobunaga to the lord of Yamato Province, fought for supremacy against his former master Miyoshi family. Followed by short appointments of Tsutsui Junkei and Toyotomi Hidenaga by Toyotomi Hideyoshi to the lord, the Tokugawa shogunate ultimately ruled the city of Nara directly, and most parts of Yamato province with a few feudal lords allocated at Kōriyama, Takatori and other places. With industry and commerce developing in the 18th century, the economy of the province was incorporated into prosperous Osaka, the commercial capital of Japan at the time.

=== From the establishment of Nara Prefecture to the present ===
A first prefecture (briefly -fu in 1868, but -ken for most of the time) named Nara was established in the Meiji Restoration in 1868 as successor to the shogunate administration of the shogunate city and shogunate lands in Yamato. After the 1871 Abolition of the han system, Nara was merged with other prefectures (from former han, see List of Han#Yamato Province) and cleared of ex-/enclaves to encompass all of Yamato province. In 1876, Nara was merged into Sakai which in turn became part of Osaka in 1881. In 1887, Nara became independent again, with Saisho Atsushi as the first governor. The first prefectural assembly of Nara was elected in the same year and opened its first session in 1888 in the gallery of the main hall of Tōdai temple.

In the 1889 Great Meiji mergers which subdivided all (then 45) prefectures into modern municipalities, Nara prefecture's 16 districts were subdivided into 154 municipalities: 10 towns and 144 villages. The first city in Nara was only established in 1898 when Nara Town from Soekami District was made district-independent to become Nara City (see List of mergers in Nara Prefecture and List of mergers in Osaka Prefecture).

The economic dependency to Osaka even characterizes today's Nara Prefecture, for many inhabitants commute to Osaka to work or study there.

== Geography ==
Topographic map of Nara Prefecture

Administrative map of Nara Prefecture City Town Village

Nara Prefecture is part of the Kansai, or Kinki, region of Japan, and is located in the middle of the Kii Peninsula on the western half of Honshu. Nara Prefecture is inland. It is bordered to the west by Wakayama Prefecture and Osaka Prefecture; on the north by Kyoto Prefecture and on the east by Mie Prefecture.

Nara Prefecture is 78.5 kilometres (48.8 mi) from east to west and 103.6 kilometres (64.4 mi) from north to south.

Most of the prefecture is covered by mountains and forests, leaving an inhabitable area of only 851 square kilometres (329 sq mi). The ratio of inhabitable area to total area is 23%, ranked 43rd among the 47 prefectures in Japan.

Nara Prefecture is bisected by the Japan Median Tectonic Line (MTL) running through its territory east to west, along the Yoshino River. On the northern side of the MTL is the so-called Inner Zone, where active faults running north to south are still shaping the landscape. The Ikoma Mountains in the northwest form the border with Osaka Prefecture. The Nara Basin, which lies to the east of these mountains, contains the highest concentration of population in Nara Prefecture. Further east are the Kasagi Mountains, which separate the Basin from the Yamato Highlands.

South of the MTL is the Outer Zone, comprising the Kii Mountains, which occupy about 60% of the land area of the prefecture. The Ōmine Range is in the center of the Kii Mountains, running north to south, with steep valleys on both sides. The tallest mountain in Nara Prefecture, and indeed in the Kansai region, is Mount Hakkyō. To the west, separating Nara Prefecture from Wakayama Prefecture, is the Obako Range, with peaks around 1,300 metres (4,300 ft). To the east, bordering Mie Prefecture, is the Daikō Range, including Mount Ōdaigahara. This mountainous region is also home to a World Heritage Site, the Sacred Sites and Pilgrimage Routes in the Kii Mountain Range".

About 17% of the total land area of the prefecture is designated as National Park land, comprising the Yoshino-Kumano National Park, Kongō-Ikoma-Kisen, Kōya-Ryūjin, Murō-Akame-Aoyama, and Yamato-Aogaki Quasi-National Parks; and the Tsukigase-Kōnoyama, Yata, and Yoshinogawa-Tsuboro Prefectural Natural Parks.

=== Climate ===
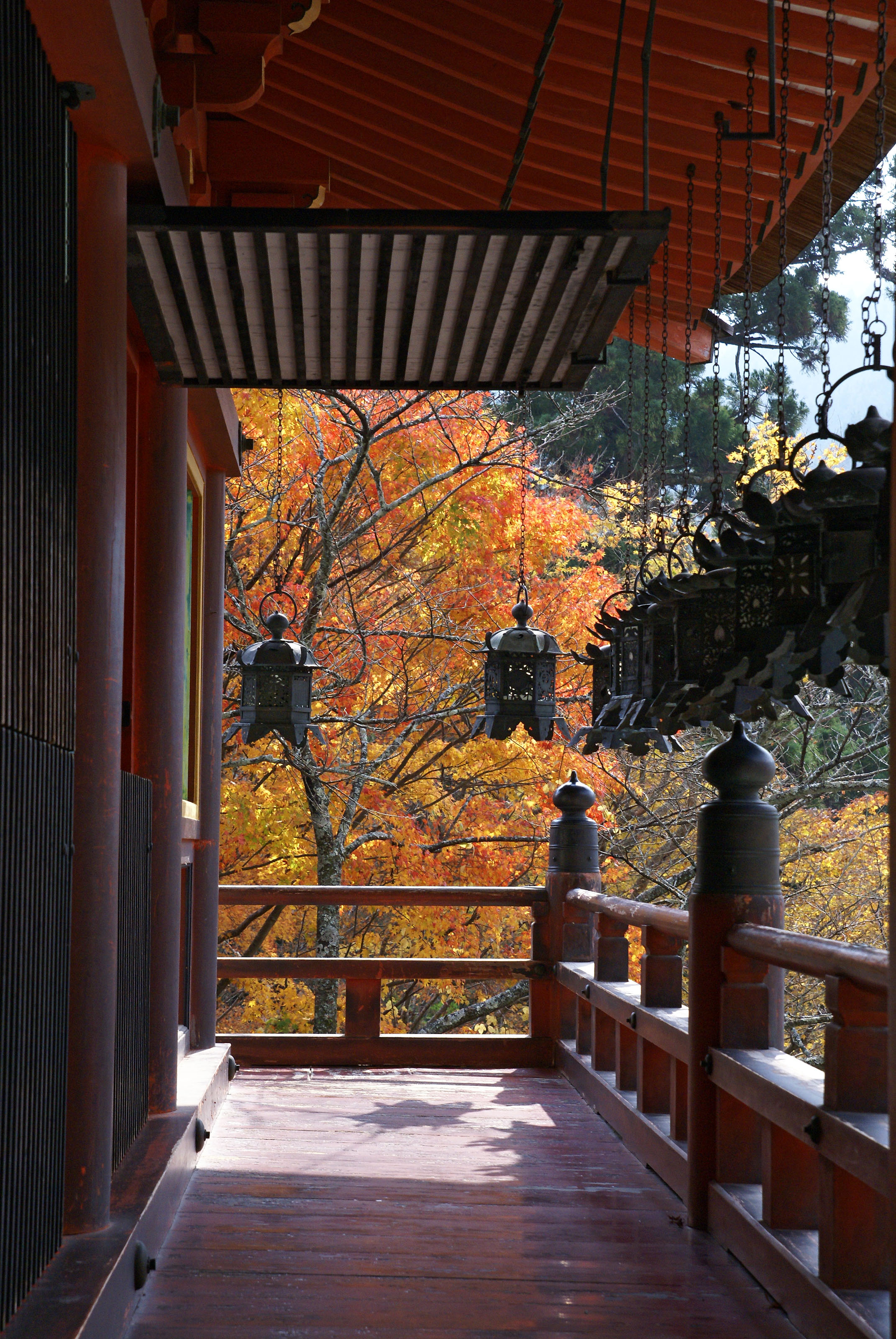
Tanzan Shrine in autumn

In the Nara Basin, the climate has inland characteristics, as represented in the bigger temperature variance within the same day, and the difference of summer and winter temperatures. Winter temperatures average about 3 to 5 °C (37 to 41 °F), and 25 to 28 °C (77 to 82 °F) in the summer with highest reaching close to 35 °C (95 °F). There is not a single year over the last decade (since 1990, up to 2007) with more than 10 days of snowfall recorded by Nara Local Meteorological Observatory.

The climate in the rest of the prefecture are mountainous, and especially in the south, with below −5 °C (23 °F) being the extreme minimum in winter. Heavy rainfall is observed in summer. The annual accumulated rainfall ranges as much as 3,000 to 5,000 millimetres (120 to 200 in), which is among the heaviest in Japan.

Spring and fall are temperate. The mountainous region of Yoshino has been popular both historically and presently for its cherry blossoms in the spring. In the fall, the southern mountains are equally striking with the changing of the oak trees.

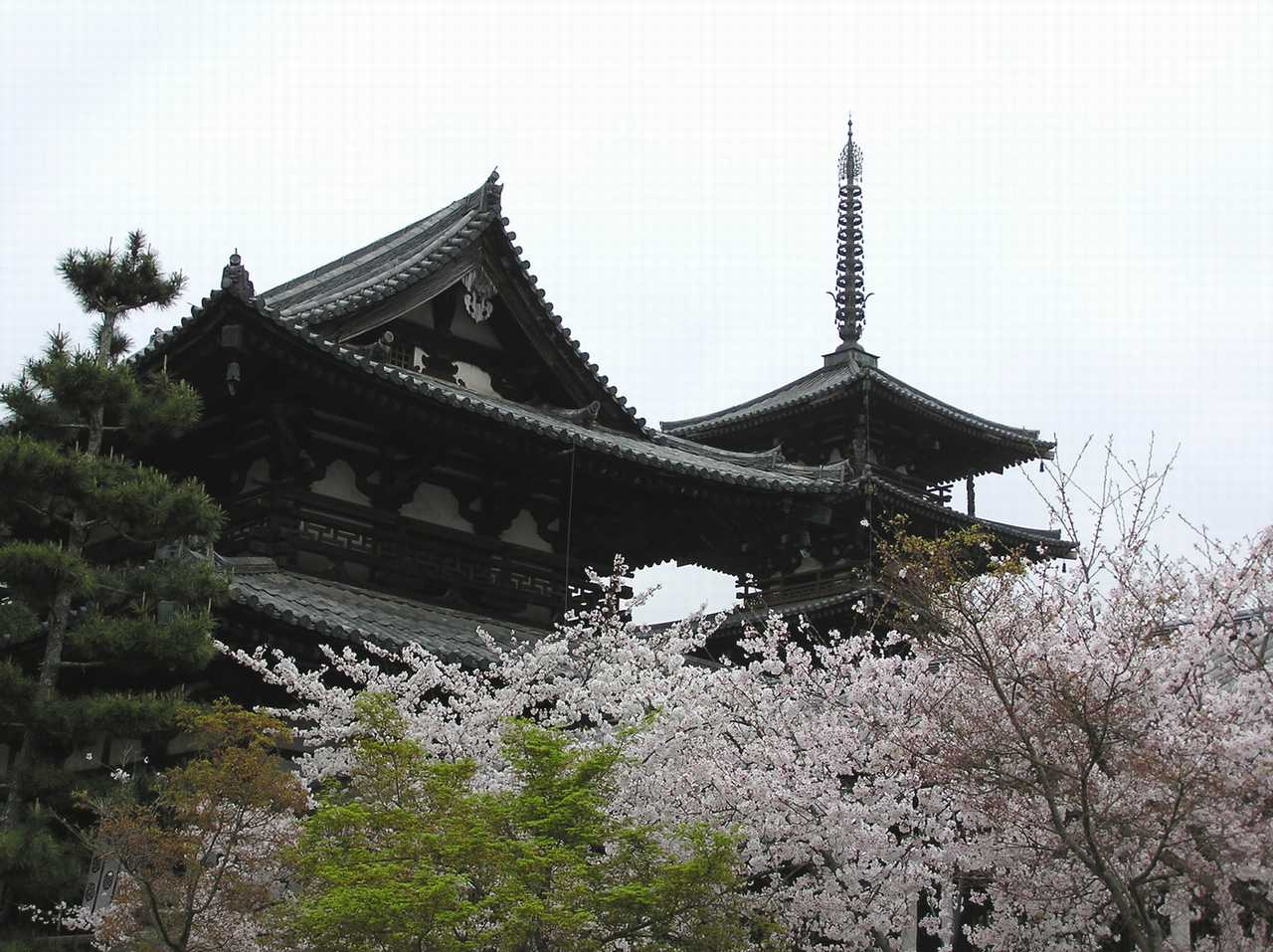
Hōryū-ji at cherry blossom, Ikaruga Town

=== Municipalities ===
Since 2006, there are 39 municipalities in Nara Prefecture: twelve [by definition: district-independent] cities and seven remaining districts containing 15 towns and twelve villages:

Abbreviation	Full name	Area (km^{2})	Population	District	Type	Map
Abbreviation	Japanese, Romanization	Area (km^{2})	Population	District	Type	Map
Gojō	五條市, Gojō-shi	291.98	33,283	—	City (-shi)	
Gose	御所市, Gose-shi	60.65	26,522	—	City (-shi)	
Ikoma	生駒市, Ikoma-shi	53.18	120,741	—	City (-shi)	
Kashiba	香芝市, Kashiba-shi	24.23	79,023	—	City (-shi)	
Kashihara	橿原市, Kashihara-shi	39.52	124,829	—	City (-shi)	
Katsuragi	葛󠄀城市, Katsuragi-shi	33.73	37,352	—	City (-shi)	
Nara (capital)	奈良市, Nara-shi	276.84	359,666	—	City (-shi)	
Sakurai	桜井市, Sakurai-shi	98.92	58,386	—	City (-shi)	
Tenri	天理市, Tenri-shi	86.37	66,866	—	City (-shi)	
Uda	宇陀市, Uda-shi	247.62	31,274	—	City (-shi)	
Yamatokōriyama	大和郡山市, Yamato-Kōriyama-shi	42.69	87,541	—	City (-shi)	
Yamatotakada	大和高田市, Yamato-Takada-shi	16.48	66,400	—	City (-shi)	
Ando	安堵町, Ando-chō	4.33	7,523	Ikoma District	Town (-chō)	
Asuka	明日香村, Asuka-mura	24.08	5,681	Takaichi District	Village (-mura)	
Heguri	平群町, Heguri-chō	23.9	18,774	Ikoma District	Town (-chō)	
Higashiyoshino	東吉野村, Higashi-Yoshino-mura	131.6	1,661	Yoshino District	Village (-mura)	
Ikaruga	斑鳩町, Ikaruga-chō	14.27	27,341	Ikoma District	Town (-chō)	
Kamikitayama	上北山村, Kami-Kitayama-mura	274.05	486	Yoshino District	Village (-mura)	
Kanmaki	上牧町, Kanmaki-chō	6.14	22,807	Kitakatsuragi District	Town (-chō)	
Kawai	河合町, Kawai-chō	8.27	17,831	Kitakatsuragi District	Town (-chō)	
Kawakami	川上村, Kawakami-mura	269.26	1,498	Yoshino District	Village (-mura)	
Kawanishi	川西町, Kawanishi-chō	5.94	8,704	Shiki District	Town (-chō)	
Kōryō	広陵町, Kōryō-chō	16.34	35,021	Kitakatsuragi District	Town (-chō)	
Kurotaki	黒滝村, Kurotaki-mura	47.71	745	Yoshino District	Village (-mura)	
Mitsue	御杖村, Mitsue-mura	79.63	1,696	Uda District	Village (-mura)	
Miyake	三宅町, Miyake-chō	4.07	7,013	Shiki District	Town (-chō)	
Nosegawa	野迫川村, Nosegawa-mura	155.03	424	Yoshino District	Village (-mura)	
Ōji	王寺町, Ōji-chō	7	22,791	Kitakatsuragi District	Town (-chō)	
Ōyodo	大淀町, Ōyodo-chō	38.06	17,731	Yoshino District	Town (-chō)	
Sangō	三郷町, Sangō-chō	8.8	23,455	Ikoma District	Town (-chō)	
Shimoichi	下市町, Shimoichi-chō	62.01	5,378	Yoshino District	Town (-chō)	
Shimokitayama	下北山村, Shimo-Kitayama-mura	133.53	855	Yoshino District	Village (-mura)	
Soni	曽爾村, Soni-mura	47.84	1,528	Uda District	Village (-mura)	
Takatori	高取町, Takatori-chō	25.77	6,964	Takaichi District	Town (-chō)	
Tawaramoto	田原本町, Tawaramoto-chō	21.09	32,241	Shiki District	Town (-chō)	
Tenkawa	天川村, Tenkawa-mura	175.7	1,310	Yoshino District	Village (-mura)	
Totsukawa	十津川村, Totsukawa-mura	672.35	3,488	Yoshino District	Village (-mura)	
Yamazoe	山添村, Yamazoe-mura	66.52	3,701	Yamabe District	Village (-mura)	
Yoshino	吉野町, Yoshino-chō	95.96	6,337	Yoshino District	Town (-chō)	
Nara	奈良県, Nara-ken	3,691.09	1,321,805	—	Prefecture (-ken)	

Kansai Science City is located in the northwest.

== Demographics ==
Nara prefecture population pyramid in 2020

Population by districts
District	Area Size (km^{2})	Population	Density per km^{2}
Yamato flat inland plain	837.27	1,282	1,531
(Share in %)	22.7%	89.7%	
Yamato highland	506.89	56	110
(Share in %)	13.7%	3.9%	
Gojō, Yoshino	2,346.84	92	39
(Share in %)	63.6%	6.4%	
Total Prefecture	3,691.09	1,430	387
(Share in %)	100.0%	100.0%	

In the 2005 census, Nara Prefecture had a population of 1,421,310, a decrease of 1.5% since the year 2000.

The decline continued in 2006, with another decrease of 4,987 people compared to 2005. This includes a natural decrease from previous year of 288 people (11,404 births minus 11,692 deaths) and a decrease due to net domestic migration of 4,627 people outbound from the prefecture, and a decrease of 72 registered foreigners. Net domestic migration has turned into a continuous outbound trend since 1998.

The largest internal migration destinations in 2005 were the prefectures of Kyoto, Tokyo, and Hyōgo, with respectively a net of 1,130,982 and 451 people moving over. The largest inbound migration was from Niigata Prefecture, contributing to a net increase of 39 people. 13.7% of its population were reported as under 15, 65.9% between 15 and 64, and 20.4% were 65 or older. Females made up approximately 52.5% of the population.

In 2004, the average density of the prefecture was 387 people per km^{2}. By districts, the Yamato flat inland plain holds as much as about 90% of total population within the approximately 23% size of area in the north-west, including the Nara Basin, representing a density of 1,531 people per km^{2}. In contrast, the combined district Gojō and Yoshino District occupies almost 64% of the land, while only 6% of people lives there, resulting in a density of 39 people km^{2}.

Nara prefecture had the highest rate in Japan of people commuting outbound for work, at 30.9% in 2000. A similar tendency is seen in prefectures such as Saitama, Chiba, and Kanagawa, all three of them having over 20% of people commuting for other prefectures.

== Politics ==
- A governor and members of prefectural assembly is elected by citizens in accordance with the Local Autonomy Law.
- Shōgo Arai was governor between 2007 and 2023, a former LDP member of the national House of Councillors. In the April 2019 gubernatorial election, he was re-elected to a fourth term with major party support (LDP, DPFP, Kōmeitō) with 47.5% of the vote against former Democratic Diet member and vice-minister Kiyoshige Maekawa (32.3%) and independent physician Minoru Kawashima (20.2%).
- In 2023, Makoto Yamashita was elected governor. This was the first time Nippon Ishi gained a governor outside of Osaka.
- As of 2019, there are 43 seats in the Nara Prefectural Assembly, elected in 16 constituencies (4 single-member, 12 multi-member). After the April 2019 assembly election, the LDP is by far the largest party with 21 members while no other party won more than four seats, but its members are split between several parliamentary groups; by group, the composition as of May 2019 was: LDP 10, LDP Nara 9, Sōsei Nara [of independents] 5, Shinsei Nara [mainly DPFP] 5, JCP 4, Nippon Ishin no Kai 4, Kōmeitō 3, LDP Kizuna 2.
- There was a clear tendency seen through the results of Lower House election in 2005, that the younger generation executes its voting right much less compared to the older. Only 48.8% of citizens age 20–29 voted, whereas all older generations (grouped by decades) votes more than its younger, reaching the highest voting rate of 86.3% at ages 60–69. The only exception was the 72.1% voting right executed by citizens of 70 or older. The overall average of the prefecture who voted was yet higher, at 70.3%, than that of nationwide average, 67.5%.
- As of October 2019, Nara's directly elected delegation to the National Diet is all-LDP, namely:
  - in the House of Representatives where Nara has lost one district in a 2017 reapportionment
    - for the 1st district in the North consisting of most of Nara City and Ikoma City: Shigeki Kobayashi (LDP, 2nd term) who narrowly defeated long-time incumbent Sumio Mabuchi in the 2017 House of Representatives election,
    - for the 2nd district with southern suburbs (and a small part) of the capital: Sanae Takaichi (LDP, 8th term), who has served as prime minister of Japan and president of the Liberal Democratic Party since 2025, and was re-elected with 60% of the vote in 2017,
    - for the 3rd district which covers the less urbanized, central and Southern parts of Nara: Taidō Tanose (LDP, 3rd term), member for the now-abolished 4th district before 2017,
  - in the House of Councillors where the Nara district is one of the often decisive FPTP single-member districts
    - in the 2016–2022 class: Kei Satō (LDP, 1st term) who defeated incumbent Kiyoshige Maekawa in 2016 by a twelve-point-margin in a three-way contest with an Osaka Ishin no Kai challenger,
    - in the 2019–2025 class: Iwao Horii (LDP, 2nd term) who defended the seat 55% to 40% against an "independent", joint centre-left (CDP, DPFP, SDP) challenger in 2019.

== Economy ==
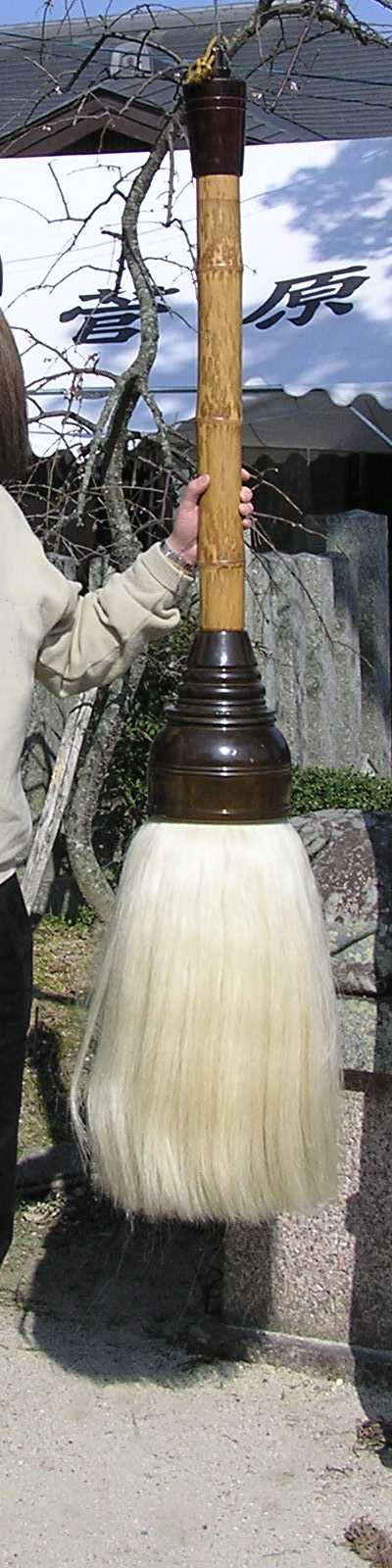
A huge Nara calligraphy brush

The 2004 total gross prefecture product (GPP) for Nara was ¥3.8 trillion, an 0.1% growth over previous year. The per capita income was ¥2.6 million, which is a 1.3% decrease from previous year. Manufacturing has the biggest share in the GPP of Nara with 20.2% of share, followed by services (19.1%) and real estates (16.3%). The share of agriculture including forestry and fishery was a mere 1.0%, only above mining, which is quasi-inexistent in Nara.

- Tourism is treated by the prefectural government as one of the most important features of Nara, because of its natural environment and historical significance.
- Nara is famed for its Kaki persimmon. Strawberry and tea are some other popular products of the prefecture, while rice and vegetables, including spinach, tomato, eggplants, and others are the dominant in terms of amount of production.
- Nara is a center for the production of instruments used in conducting traditional Japanese artforms. Brush and ink (sumi) are the best known products from Nara for calligraphy. Wooden or bamboo instruments, especially from Takayama area (in Ikoma city) are famous products for tea ceremony.
- Goldfish from Yamatokōriyama in Nara have been a traditional aquacultural product since the 18th century.
- Due to its rich history, Nara is also the location of many archeological digs, with many famous ones being located in the village of Asuka.

== Culture ==
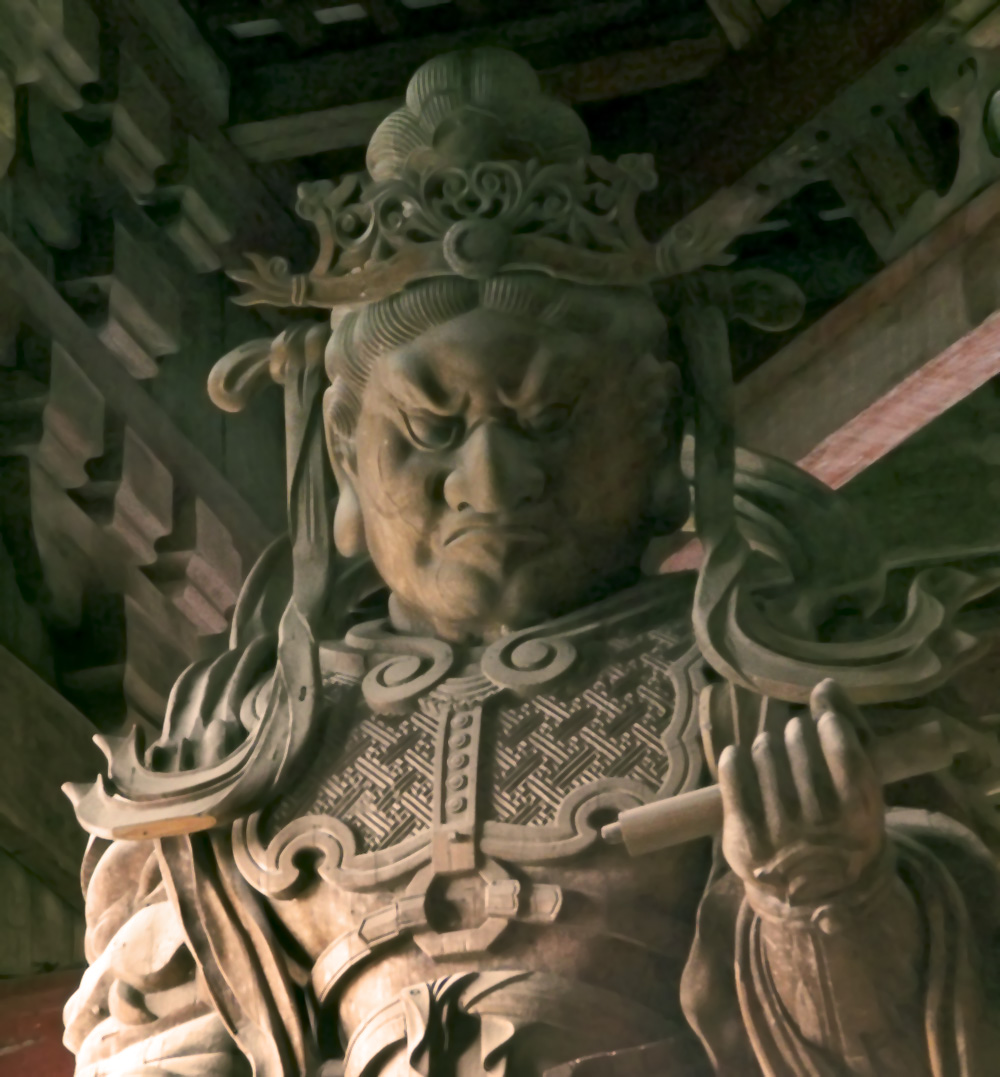
Statue at Tōdai-ji

The culture of Nara is tied to the Kansai region in which it is located. However, like each of the other prefectures of Kansai, Nara has unique aspects to its culture, parts of which stem from its long history dating back to the Nara period.

=== Dialect ===
There are large differences in dialect between the north/central region of the prefecture, where Nara city is located, and the Okunoya district in the south. The north/central dialect is close to Osaka's dialect, whilst Okunoya's dialect favours a Tokyo-style accent. The lengthening of vowel sounds in the Okunoya dialect is unseen in other dialects of the Kinki region, making it a special feature.

=== Food culture ===
Foods particular to Nara Prefecture include:

- Chagayu, a rice porridge made with green tea
- Kakinoha zushi, sushi wrapped in persimmon leaves
- Meharizushi, rice balls wrapped in pickled takana leaves
- Miwa sōmen, a type of wheat noodle
- Narazuke, a method of pickling vegetables

=== Traditional arts ===
The following are recognized by the Minister of Economy, Trade and Industry as being traditional arts of Nara:

- Nara Calligraphy Brush (Stationery category, recognized in 1977)
- Takayama Tea Whisk (Bamboo item category, recognized in 1975)

=== Museums ===
- Heijō Palace Museum
- Kashihara Archaeological Institute Museum
- Nara National Museum
- Nara Prefectural Museum of Art

== Education ==
=== Universities ===
- Hakuhō College
- Kio University
- Nara Institute of Science and Technology
- Nara Medical University
- Nara Prefectural University
- Nara Sangyo University (Nara Industrial University)
- Nara University
- Nara University of Education
- Nara Women's University
- Tenri University
- Tezukayama University

== Sports ==
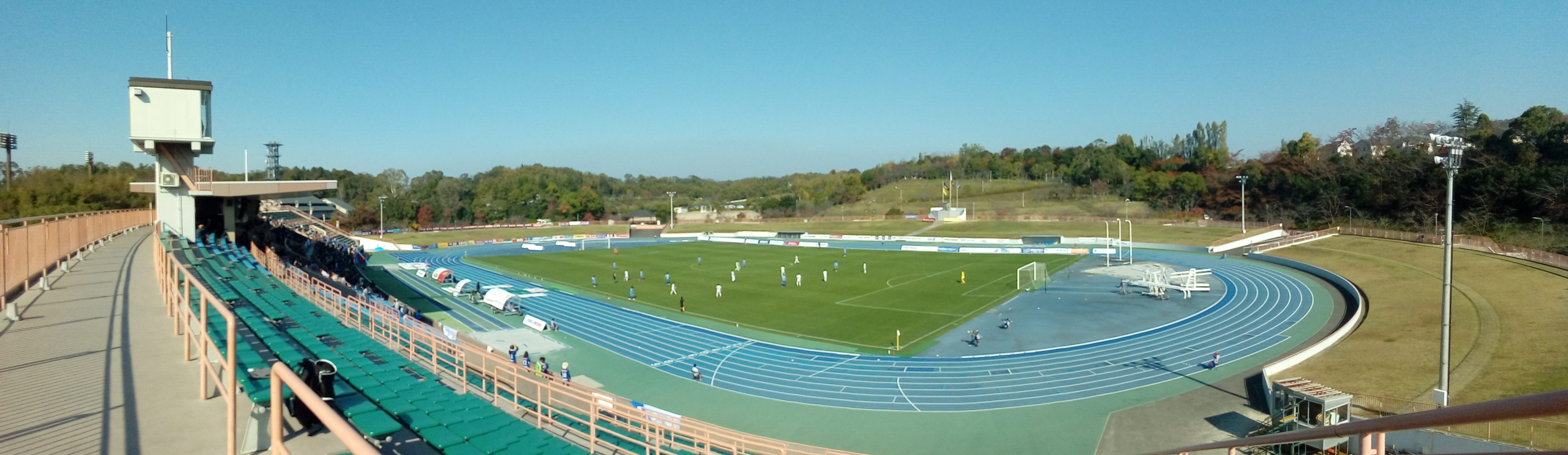
Konoike Athletic Stadium.

The sports teams listed below are based in Nara.

Association football

- Asuka FC (Kashihara)
- Nara Club (Nara)
- Velago Ikoma (Ikoma)

Basketball

- Bambitious Nara (Nara)

== Tourism ==
Many jinja (Shinto shrines), Buddhist temples, and kofun exist in Nara Prefecture, making it is a centre for tourism. Moreover, many world heritage sites, such as the temple Tōdai-ji and Kasuga Shrine, exist in the capital city of Nara.

=== World Heritage Sites ===
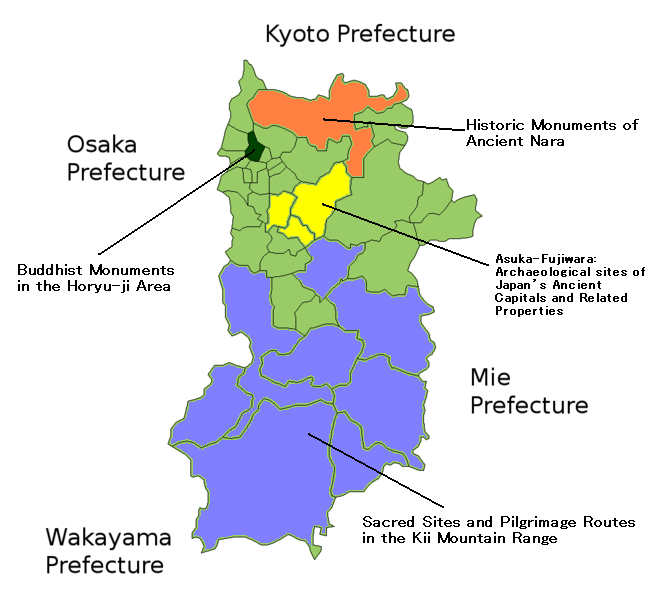
World Heritage Sites in Nara

Buddhist Monuments in the Hōryū-ji Area
Hōryū-ji	法隆寺
Hokki-ji (Hōki-ji)	法起寺

Historic Monuments of Ancient Nara
Tōdai-ji	東大寺
Kōfuku-ji	興福寺
Kasuga Shrine	春日大社
Gangō-ji	元興寺
Yakushi-ji	薬師寺
Tōshōdai-ji	唐招提寺
Heijō Palace remains	平城宮跡
Shōsō-in	正倉院

Sacred Sites and Pilgrimage Routes in the Kii Mountain Range
Area
Mt. Yoshino	Kinpusen-ji
Mt. Yoshino	Yoshino Mikumari Shrine
Mt. Yoshino	Kinpu Shrine
Mt. Yoshino	Yoshimizu Shrine
Mount Omine	Ominesan-ji

Buddhist temples
Asuka-dera	飛鳥寺
Chūgū-ji	中宮寺
Hase-dera	長谷寺
Hōrin-ji	法輪寺
Murō-ji	室生寺
Saidai-ji	西大寺
Shin-Yakushi-ji	新薬師寺
Southern Hokke-ji	南法華寺
Taima-dera	当麻寺

Shinto shrines
Isonokami Shrine	石上神宮
Kashihara Shrine	橿原神宮
Danzan Shrine	談山神社
Ōmiwa Shrine	大神神社
Ōyamato Shrine	大和神社

Kofun and heritage
Monuments of Asuka-Fujiwara, proposed for inscription on the UNESCO World Heritage List
Ishibutai Tomb	石舞台古墳
Kitora Tomb	キトラ古墳
Takamatsuzuka Tomb	高松塚古墳
Hashihaka Tomb	箸墓古墳
Umami Kofun Group	馬見古墳群
Sakafuneishi Heritage	酒船石遺跡

Hot springs
Dorogawa	洞川温泉
Shionoha	入之波温泉
Kamiyu	上湯温泉
Totsukawa	十津川温泉

Mountains
Yamato Sanzan*	大和三山
Mount Wakakusa	若草山
* "Three Mountains of Yamato"

Other attractions
Nara Park	奈良公園
Yoshino-Kumano National Park	吉野熊野国立公園
Kongō-Ikoma-Kisen Quasi-National Park	金剛生駒紀泉国定公園
Kōya-Ryūjin Quasi-National Park	高野龍神国定公園
Murō-Akame-Aoyama Quasi-National Park	室生赤目青山国定公園
Yamato-Aogaki Quasi-National Park	大和青垣国定公園

== Transportation ==
=== Railroad ===
- JR West
  - Kansai Line
  - Manyo Mahoroba Line
  - Wakayama Line
  - Yamatoji Line
- Kintetsu
  - Gose Line
  - Ikoma Line
  - Ikoma Cable Line
  - Kashihara Line
  - Keihanna Line
  - Kyoto Line
  - Minami Osaka Line
  - Nara Line
  - Osaka Line
  - Tawaramoto Line
  - Tenri Line
  - Yoshino Line

=== Bus ===
==== From Nara and Tenri ====
- Kansai International Airport
- Makuhari, Chiba Prefecture
- Nagoya
- Osaka International Airport
- Shinjuku, Tokyo
- Tokyo Disneyland in Urayasu
- Tokyo Station
- Yokohama

==== From Yamato Yagi and Gose ====
- Shingu
- Shinjuku, Tokyo
- Totsukawa

=== Road ===
==== Expressways and toll roads ====
- Keinawa Expressway
- Meihan Road
- Nishi-Meihan Expressway
- Second Hanna(Osaka-Nara) Road
- South Hanna Road

==== National highways ====
- Route 24
- Route 25 (Osaka-Tenri-Nabari-Yokkaichi)
- Route 163
- Route 165
- Route 166
- Route 168 (Hirakata-Ikoma-Kashiba-Gojo-Totsukawa-Shingu)
- Route 169 (Nara-Tenri-Oyodo-Yoshino-Shingu)
- Route 308
- Route 309
- Route 310
- Route 311
- Route 368
- Route 369
- Route 370
- Route 371
- Route 422
- Route 425
