= Yoshinogawa =

Yoshinogawa may refer to:

- Yoshino-gawa or Yoshino River, a river through Shikoku
- Yoshinogawa, Tokushima, a city in Tokushima Prefecture
- Kinokawa River, called Yoshinogawa in Nara Prefecture, Japan

== See also ==
- Yoshinogawa-Tsuboro Prefectural Natural Park, in Nara Prefecture, Japan
