= Miyu Irino =

Japanese voice actor and singer (born 1988)

- 入野 自由
- Born: February 19, 1988 (age 38); Tokyo, Japan
- Occupations: Actor; voice actor; singer
- Years active: 1992–present
- Agent: Junction
- Spouse: Unknown (m. 2021)
- Musical career
- Genres: J-pop; anime song
- Instrument: Vocals
- Years active: 2009–present
- Labels: Kiramune; Nippon Columbia
- Member of: Kamiyu
- Website: Official website

Miyu Irino (入野 自由, Irino Miyu; born February 19, 1988) is a Japanese actor, voice actor and singer.

He is most famously known for his voice roles as Haku in Spirited Away, Shoya Ishida in A Silent Voice, Sena Kobayakawa in Eyeshield 21, Jinta "Jintan" Yadomi in Anohana, Syaoran in Tsubasa: Reservoir Chronicle, Yuichiro Hyakuya in Seraph of the End, Episode in the Monogatari series, Kōshi Sugawara in Haikyu!!, Natts in Yes! PreCure 5!, Apollon Agana Belea in Kamigami no Asobi, Sora in the Kingdom Hearts video game series, and Sabo in One Piece.

He released his debut mini-album Soleil on June 26, 2009, and his first single album Faith later that same year on November 25.

== Biography ==
Born on February 19, 1988, in Tokyo, Japan, as an only child Irino was good at playing by himself as a kid but also loved going outside to play with his friends.

Motivated by an interest in a Shiki Theatre Company performance he saw with his parents, Irino joined Gekidan Himawari at the age of four. Two years later, he officially made his debut as an actor portraying a young boy in the historical television drama Janusz Korczak. He remained a member of the company until joining Junction in 2006.

He made as debut as a voice actor in the role of Sho in the You're Under Arrest television anime, later recalling it as an "enjoyable experience." In 2001, he passed the audition for the role of Haku, one of the main characters in Spirited Away. That same year, Irino landed his first starring role in a television anime as PaRappa in PaRappa the Rapper, and gained widespread recognition for voicing the main character Sora in the 2002 video game Kingdom Hearts.

By 2012, Irino had spent 20 years in the entertainment industry. In an interview around 2011, he noted that while he used to work primarily with older actors, he had recently seen an increase in opportunities to co-star with people of his own generation. He graduated from Meiji Gakuin Senior High School.

On June 24, 2009, he made his debut as a singer under the Kiramune label. In 2010, he graduated from the Department of Business Administration, Faculty of Economics, Meiji Gakuin University. In that same year on May 11, he formed the unit KAmiYU within the Kiramune label with Hiroshi Kamiya.

In December 2016, Irino announced that he had gone on hiatus to study abroad, which he had been considering at the time. On September 3, 2021, Irino announced that he was married.

He ended his solo artist activities with Kiramune on June 30, 2024, then announced the following year in May his label transfer to Nippon Columbia and resumed activities as an artist.

== Filmography ==
=== Television animation ===
1996

- You're Under Arrest - Sho

2001

- PaRappa the Rapper - PaRappa

2002

- Ghost in the Shell: Stand Alone Complex - Masukā Omba

2003

- Cromartie High School - Osamu Kido
- D.N.Angel - Daisuke Niwa
- Wolf's Rain - Hasu

2004

- Fafner in the Azure - Kōyō Kasugai
- Kurau Phantom Memory - Ivon
- Madlax - Chris
- Windy Tales - Jun
- Zipang - Young Yosuke

2005

- Eyeshield 21 - Sena Kobayakawa
- Starship Operators - Shimei Yuuki
- Tsubasa Reservoir Chronicles - Syaoran

2006

- Air Gear - Nue
- D. Gray-man - Narein
- Futari wa Pretty Cure Splash Star - Manabu Miyasako
- Gin'iro no Olynssis - Tokito Aizawa
- Yomigaeru Sora - Rescue Wings - Satoshi Yoshioka

2007

- Darker Than Black - Young Hei
- Mobile Suit Gundam 00 - Saji Crossroad
- One Piece - Jiro
- Yes! PreCure 5 - Natts

2008

- Birdy the Mighty Decode - Tsutomu Senkawa
- Kurozuka (novel)) - Kuon
- Neo Angelique Abyss - Erenfried
- Yes! PreCure 5 GoGo! - Natts
- Zettai Karen Children - Kagari Hino

2009

- 07 Ghost - Shuri Oak
- Asura Cryin' - Tomoharu Natsume
- Asura Cryin' 2 - Tomoharu Natsume, Naotaka Natsume
- Metal Fight Beyblade - Tsubasa Otori
- Cross Game - Ko Kitamura
- First Love Limited - Mamoru Zaitsu
- Kobato - Syaoran
- Miracle Train - Takuto Kichijōji
- Phantom: Requiem for the Phantom - Zwei/Reiji Azuma
- Tatakau Shisho - The Book of Bantorra - Colio Tonies

2010

- Naruto Shippuden - Yagura, Saiken
- Nura: Rise of the Yokai Clan - Tosakamaru
- Okami-san and Her Seven Companions - Ryoshi Morino
- Model Suit Gunpla Builders Beginning G - Tatsu Shimano
- And Yet the Town Moves - Hiroyuki Sanada
- Metal Fight Beyblade Baku - Tsubasa Otori

2011

- Anohana - Jinta Yadomi
- Fate/Zero - Kiritsugu Emiya (young)
- Ground Control to Psychoelectric Girl - Makoto Niwa
- Metal Fight Beyblade 4D - Tsubasa Otori
- Kimi to Boku - Chizuru Tachibana
- Sacred Seven - Makoto Kagami
- Un-Go - Seigen Hayami
- Yu-Gi-Oh! Zexal - Astral, Number 96

2012

- Daily Lives of High School Boys - Tadakuni
- Hyouka - Jirō Sugimura
- Metal Fight Beyblade Zero-G - Tsubasa Otori
- Mysterious Girlfriend X - Akira Tsubaki
- Naruto Shippuden - Minato Namikaze (child)
- Pokémon - Masaomi, Kyohei
- Tsuritama - Haru
- Yu-Gi-Oh! Zexal II - Astral, Number 96

2013

- Nekomonogatari (White)) - Episode
- Cuticle Detective Inaba - Kei Nozaki
- Chihayafuru 2 - Akihiro Tsukuba
- Karneval - Yotaka
- Naruto Shippuden - Yagura, Saiken

2014

- Captain Earth - Daichi Manatsu
- Haikyū!! - Kōshi Sugawara
- Kamigami no Asobi - Apollon Agana Berea

2015

- Fafner in the Azure: Exodus - Kōyō Kasugai
- Haikyū!! 2 - Kōshi Sugawara
- Mr. Osomatsu - Todomatsu
- Seraph of the End - Yūichirō Hyakuya

2016

- Haikyū!! 3 - Kōshi Sugawara
- Kizumonogatari - Episode
- Mob Psycho 100 - Ritsu Kageyama

2017

- Mr. Osomatsu 2 - Todomatsu

2018

- Amanchu! Advance - Peter
- Beatless - Higgins
- Run with the Wind - Akane Kashiwazaki
- Shinya! Tensai Bakabon - Bakabon

2019

- Carole & Tuesday - Roddy
- Chihayafuru 3 - Akihiro Tsukuba
- Kono Oto Tomare! Sounds of Life - Taishin Yamamoto
- Midnight Occult Civil Servants - Theo Himezuka
- Mob Psycho 100 II - Ritsu Kageyama
- Bungo Stray Dogs 3 - Karma

2020

- Haikyu!! To the Top - Kōshi Sugawara
- Mr. Osomatsu 3 - Todomatsu Matsuno
- Oda Cinnamon Nobunaga - Lis (Akechi Mitsuhide)

2021

- Platinum End - Mirai Kakehashi
- Digimon Ghost Game - Monzaemon

2022

- Yurei Deco - Finn
- Mob Psycho 100 III - Ritsu Kageyama

2023

- The Masterful Cat Is Depressed Again Today - Shop Manager
- Akuma-kun - Takekuma

2024

- Yatagarasu: The Raven Does Not Choose Its Master - Wakamiya
- Orb: On the Movements of the Earth - Mazur
- Grendizer U - Duke Fleed
- One Piece - Sabo (episode 1116+)

2025

- Blue Exorcist: The Blue Night Saga - Rick Lincoln
- City the Animation - Tatewaku Makabe
- Mr. Osomatsu 4 - Todomatsu Matsuno
- A Wild Last Boss Appeared! - Mars
- Digimon Beatbreak - Tomorō Tenma

2026

- Ghost Concert: Missing Songs - Yōtetsu
- Jaadugar: A Witch in Mongolia - Shira
- Love Unseen Beneath the Clear Night Sky - Kakeru Sorano

=== Tokusatsu ===
Actor

- Ultraman Gaia: The Battle in Hyperspace (1999) - Yu Hirama

Voice actor

- Kamen Rider OOO (2010–2011) - Ankh (Lost) (eps. 29 - 42)
- Ultra Zero Fight (2013) - Jean-nine
- Ultraman Zero Side Story: Killer the Beatstar (2011) - Jean-nine
- Ultraman Geed the Movie: Connect Them! The Wishes!! (2018) - Jean-nine
- Yoshihiko and the Key of Evil Spirits (2012) - Emperor

=== Original video animation ===
- Tsubasa Tokyo Revelations (2007) - Syaoran
- Saint Seiya: The Lost Canvas (2009) - Hanuman Tokusa
- Tsubasa: Shunraiki (2009) - Syaoran
- xxxHolic Shunmuki (2009) - Syaoran
- Air Gear: Kuro no Hane to Nemuri no Mori (2010) - Kazuma "Kazu" Mikura
- Zettai Karen Children (2010) - Kagari Hino
- Five Numbers! (2011) - Young Man
- Senjou no Valkyria 3: Tagatame no Juusou (2011) - Zig
- Code Geass: Akito the Exiled (2012) - Akito Hyuga
- Shinken Zemi Kōkō Kōza (2012) - Shota

=== Original net animation ===
- Pokémon Evolutions (2021) - Hop
- The Heike Story (2021) - Taira no Koremori
- Tokyo Override (2024) - Yasumoto

=== Anime films ===
- Spirited Away (2001) - Haku
- Tsubasa Chronicle the Movie: The Princess of the Country of Birdcages (2005) - Syaoran
- xxxHOLiC the Movie: A Midsummer Night's Dream (2005) - Syaoran
- Legend of Raoh: Chapter of Fierce Fight (2006) - Shiba
- Yes! Precure 5: Kagami no Kuni no Miracle Daibōken! (2007) - Natts
- Yes! Precure 5 GoGo! Okashi no Kuni no Happy Birthday (2008) - Natts
- Precure All Stars DX: Minna Tomodachi—Kiseki no Zenin Daishūgō (2009) - Natts
- Precure All Stars DX2: Kibō no Hikari—Rainbow Jewel o Mamore! (2010) - Natts
- Book Girl the Movie (2010) - Konoha Inoune
- Mobile Suit Gundam 00 the Movie: A Wakening of the Trailblazer (2010) - Saji Crossroad
- Metal Fight Beyblade vs the Sun: Sol Blaze - the Scorching Hot Invader (2010) - Tsubasa Ootori
- The Prince of Tennis: Eikoku-shiki Teikyū-jō Kessen! (2011) - Peter
- Children Who Chase Lost Voices (2011) - Shin Canaan Preases, Shun Canaan Preases
- Precure All-Stars DX3 Mirai ni Todoke! Sekai o Tsunagu Niji-Iro no Hana (2011) - Natts
- Towa no Quon (2011) - Takao
- Tiger & Bunny the Movie: The Beginning (2012) - Isaac
- Anohana (2013) - Jintan
- The Garden of Words (2013) - Takao Akizuki
- Lupin the 3rd vs. Detective Conan: The Movie (2013) - Emilio Baretti
- Miss Hokusai (2015) - Kagema
- Gekijō-ban Haikyu!! Owari to Hajimari (2015) - Kōshi Sugawara
- A Silent Voice (2016) - Shōya Ishida
- Kizumonogatari Part 2: Nekketsu (2016) - Episode
- Maquia: When the Promised Flower Blooms (2018) - Ariel
- Mr. Osomatsu: The Movie (2019) - Todomatsu Matsuno
- Child of Kamiari Month (2021) - Yasha
- Healin' Good Pretty Cure the Movie: GoGo! Big Transformation! The Town of Dreams (2021) - Natts
- Child of Kamiari Month (2021) - Yasha
- Dragon Ball Super: Super Hero (2022) - Dr. Hedo
- Mr. Osomatsu: Hipipo-Zoku to Kagayaku Kajitsu (2022) - Todomatsu Matsuno
- Hokkyoku Hyakkaten no Concierge-san (2023) - Japanese Wolf
- The Concierge at Hokkyoku Department Store (2023) - Ookami
- Code Geass: Rozé of the Recapture - Akito Hyuga
- Dead Dead Demon's Dededede Destruction (2024) - Keita Ōba
- Haikyu!! The Dumpster Battle (2024) - Kōshi Sugawara
- Mononoke the Movie: Phantom in the Rain (2024) - Tenshi
- The Rose of Versailles (2025) - Bernard Châtelet
- Cosmic Princess Kaguya! (2026) - Akira Mikado
- A New Dawn (2026) - Sentarō Tatewaki

=== Video games ===
- Kingdom Hearts (2002) - Sora
- Magic Pengel: The Quest for Color (2002) - Mono
- Eureka Seven Vol.1: The New Wave (2005) - Moondoggie
- Kingdom Hearts II (2005) - Sora
- Summon Night Craft Sword Monogatari: Hajimari no Ishi (2005) - Lemmy
- Rogue Galaxy (2005) - Harry
- Everybody's Tennis (2006) - Yuki
- Summon Night: Twin Age (2007) - Aldo
- Kingdom Hearts II: Final Mix+ (2007) - Sora
- Kingdom Hearts Re:Chain of Memories (2007) - Sora
- Saikin Koi Shiteru? (2009) - Sōhei Aiba
- Kingdom Hearts 358/2 Days (2009) - Sora
- Sunday VS Magazine: Shuuketsu! Choujou Daikessen! (2009) - Natsu Dragneel
- Kingdom Hearts: Birth by Sleep (2010) - Sora, Vanitas
- God Eater Burst (2010) - Karel Schneider
- Kingdom Hearts Re:coded (2010) - Sora
- Black Robinia (2011) - Kotaro Tachibana
- Dragon Ball Heroes (2011) - Beat/Male Saiyan Hero
- Dragon Ball Z: Ultimate Tenkaichi (2011) - Avatar (Energetic)
- Final Fantasy Type-0 (2011) - Eight
- Phantom of Inferno (2011) - Zwei/Reiji Azuma
- Valkyria Chronicles III (2011) - Zig
- SD Gundam G Generation World (2011) - Saji Crossroad
- Super Robot Wars Z2: Destruction Chapter (2011) - Blue Haro
- Kingdom Hearts 3D: Dream Drop Distance (2012) - Sora, Vanitas
- Super Robots Wars Z2: Rebirth Chapter (2012) - Saji Crossroad
- Kingdom Hearts HD 1.5 Remix (2013) - Sora
- Yu-Gi-Oh! Zexal World Duel Carnival (2013) - Astral, Number 96
- Macross 30: Voices across the Galaxy (2013) - Leon Sagaki
- Super Robot Wars UX (2013) - Koyo Kasugai
- Naruto Shippuden: Ultimate Ninja Storm 3 (2013) - Yagura
- Kamigami no Asobi (2013) - Apollon Agana Belea
- Sengoku Basara 4 (2014) - Yamanaka Yukimori
- Kingdom Hearts HD 2.5 Remix (2014) - Sora, Vanitas
- God Eater 2: Rage Burst (2015) - Karel Schneider
- Naruto Shippûden: Ultimate Ninja Storm Revolution (2014) - Yagura
- God Eater: Resurrection (2015) - Karel Schneider
- Final Fantasy Type-0 HD (2015) - Eight
- Naruto Shippuden: Ultimate Ninja Storm 4 (2016) - Yagura
- Sengoku Basara: The Legend of Sanada Yukimura (2016) - Yamanaka Yukimori
- Yu-Gi-Oh! Duel Links (2016) - Astral
- Wand of Fortune series - (2016-present) Est Rinaudo
- Osomatsusan no hesokuri wôzu (2016) - Todomatsu Matsuno
- Nîto sugoroku: Buraritabi (2016) - Todomatsu Matsuno
- Osomatsusan the Game: Hachamecha shuushoku adobaisu - Deddo oa wâku (2017) - Todomatsu Matsuno
- Kingdom Hearts HD 2.8 Final Chapter Prologue (2017) - Sora, Vanitas
- Wand of Fortune R2~Jikuu ni Shizumu Mokushiroku (2017) - Est Rinaudo [PS Vita]
- Shoumetsu Toshi 2 (2017) - Souma
- Neo Angelique Tenshi no Namida (2017) - Erenfried [PS Vita]
- Kingdom Hearts III (2019) - Sora, Vanitas
- Ikemen Revolution (2019) - Jonah Clemence
- Kingdom Hearts: Melody of Memory (2020) - Sora
- Super Smash Bros. Ultimate (2021) - Sora (archival audio)
- Phantasy Star Online 2: New Genesis (2021) - Kukka
- Fire Emblem Heroes (2021) - Elm
- Yu-Gi-Oh! Cross Duel (2021) - Astral
- Genshin Impact (2022) - Cyno
- Naruto x Boruto: Ultimate Ninja Storm Connections (2023) - Yagura
- Unicorn Overlord (2024) - Lex
- Kingdom Hearts IV (2027) - Sora

=== Theatre ===
- Anne of Green Gables - Gilbert
- Fiddler on the Roof - Perchik
- Titanic - Frederick Fleet
- Galaxy Express 999: Galaxy Opera (2018) - Tochiro Oyama

=== Live-action film ===
- Mr. Osomatsu (2022) - Todomatsu (voice)

=== TV drama ===
- A Girl and Three Sweethearts (2016)

=== Dubbing roles ===
==== Live-action ====
- Timothée Chalamet
  - Call Me by Your Name - Elio Perlman
  - Hot Summer Nights - Daniel Middleton
  - Beautiful Boy - Nic Sheff
  - Little Women - Theodore "Laurie" Laurence
  - Dune - Paul Atreides
  - Don't Look Up - Yule
  - Dune: Part Two - Paul Atreides
  - Marty Supreme - Marty Mauser
- The 4400 - Graham Holt (Cameron Bright)
- Category 6: Day of Destruction (2007 TV Tokyo edition) - Garth Benson (Jeff Sutton)
- The Cider House Rules - Buster (Kieran Culkin)
- Clouds - Zach Sobiech (Fin Argus)
- Disclosure Day - Dr. Daniel Kellner (Josh O'Connor)
- The Fabelmans - Sammy Fabelman (Gabriel LaBelle)
- Glee - Sam Evans (Chord Overstreet)
- Gully - Jesse (Kelvin Harrison Jr.)
- Interview with the Vampire (2025 BS10 Star Channel edition) - Louis de Pointe du Lac (Brad Pitt)
- Juno - Paulie Bleeker (Michael Cera)
- Killing Eve - Hugo Tiller (Edward Bluemel)
- King Arthur - young Lancelot (Elliot Henderson-Boyle)
- Kraven the Hunter - Dmitri Smerdyakov / Chameleon (Fred Hechinger)
- Mystic River - young Jimmy Markum (Jason Kelly)
- The Pale Blue Eye - Edgar Allan Poe (Harry Melling)
- The Santa Clause 2 - Charlie Calvin (Eric Lloyd)
- Savage Grace - Antony Baekeland (Eddie Redmayne)
- The Thirteenth Year - Jess Wheatley (Justin Jon Ross)
- Thumbsucker - Justin Cobb (Lou Taylor Pucci)
- Wicked - Boq Woodsman (Ethan Slater)
- Wicked: For Good - Boq Woodsman (Ethan Slater)
- Willow - Prince Graydon (Tony Revolori)

==== Animation ====
- The Lord of the Rings: The War of the Rohirrim – Hama
- My Little Pony: Equestria Girls – Legend of Everfree - Timber Spruce
- Next Avengers: Heroes of Tomorrow (Disney XD edition) - James Rogers
- Recess - Vince LaSalle (first voice)
- Underdogs - Capi

=== Music career ===
On June 24, 2009, Irino made his debut as an artist under the label Kiramune, being one of the first artists signed to the label, with his first mini album, Soleil. He released his first single, "Faith", that same year.

Caption: example table
No.	Type	Name	Date released
1	Mini album	Soleil	06/24/2009
2	Single	Faith	11/25/2009
3	Single	Jump	04/21/2010
4	Mini album	Advance	11/09/2011
5	Mini album	cocoro	08/08/2012
6	Mini album	E=mc2	02/19/2014
7	2	3	4
