= Yata Prefectural Natural Park =

Natural park of Nara prefecture, Japan

- 県立矢田自然公園
- Location within Nara Prefecture Location within Japan
- Location: Nara Prefecture, Japan
- Coordinates: 34.65°N 135.725°E
- Area: 5.24 km^{2} (2.02 sq mi)
- Established: 7 March 1967

Yata Prefectural Natural Park (県立矢田自然公園, Kenritsu Yata shizen kōen) is a Prefectural Natural Park in the hills of northwest Nara Prefecture, Japan. Established in 1967, the park spans the borders of the municipalities of Nara, Yamatokōriyama, Ikoma, and Ikaruga. Temples in the park include Ryōsen-ji, Yata-dera (矢田寺), Tōmyō-ji (東明寺), and Matsuo-dera (松尾寺).

== See also ==
- National Parks of Japan
- Kongō-Ikoma-Kisen Quasi-National Park
