= Child of Kamiari Month =

2021 Japanese animated film by Takana Shirai

- Theatrical release poster

Japanese name
- Kanji: 神在月のこども
Transcriptions
- Revised Hepburn: Kamiarizuki no Kodomo
- Directed by: Takana Shirai (Note: Animation Director (アニメーション監督), not to be confused with 作画監督)
- Screenplay by: Tetsurō Takita; Ryūta Miyake; Toshinari Shinoe
- Starring: Aju Makita; Maaya Sakamoto; Miyu Irino; Riko Nagase; Ko Shibasaki; Minako Kotobuki; Akira Kamiya; Chafurin; Wataru Takagi
- Cinematography: Junpei Taktasu
- Music by: Jun Ichikawa; Naoki-T
- Production company: Liden Films
- Distributed by: Cretica Universal (Japan); Netflix (International)
- Release dates: October 8, 2021 (Japan); February 8, 2022 (International)
- Running time: 99 minutes
- Country: Japan
- Language: Japanese

Child of Kamiari Month (Japanese: 神在月のこども, Hepburn: Kamiarizuki no Kodomo) is a 2021 Japanese animated supernatural fantasy adventure film produced by Liden Films and directed by Takana Shirai. It premiered in Japanese theaters on October 8, 2021, and in Netflix internationally on February 8, 2022. The film follows Kanna, who has a passion for running until she lost it after her mother's death. She, along with a rabbit named Shiro and a demon named Yasha, race to Izumo in Shimane in time for an annual feast of the deities, collecting the feast offerings for them from shrine deities along the way before the consequences of not doing so happen.

== Plot ==
Kanna Hayama is a young elementary school girl living in the Sumida ward of Tokyo, Japan, along with her recently widowed father, Norimasa Hayama. In school, she dreams about a flashback of her late mother, Yayoi Hayama, teaching her to run fast like her. Her leg becomes stiff during PE class, where they practice for the marathon tomorrow, with Akiko bringing her to the clinic afterward. While her classmates are out talking about the marathon, Kanna goes to the school's rabbit enclosure and she takes care of a white rabbit she calls Shiro. She is called by Miki, her best friend, telling her to walk home with her. Both of them stop by the nearby Ushijima Shrine before they separate and walk back to their respective homes. Kanna returns to her apartment, still distraught a year after Yayoi's death. Her father Norimasa returns home, bringing her shoes for the marathon tomorrow, but they were deemed too small for her.

On the day of the marathon, during a gloomy day, Kanna struggles to run towards the finish line, before she abruptly stops, letting others pass by her. Norimasa tries to comfort Kanna in the ensuing rain, but she gets upset, running away back towards Ushijima Shrine. She trips and lies flat on the ground, before her mother's keepsake bracelet activates, knocking her towards the ground. Picking up the bracelet, she wears it on her wrist. Suddenly, time itself slows down. She is frightened by the sight of a god in the shape of a big black cow that suddenly appeared before a demon boy named Yasha, appears and asks Kanna to hand over her bracelet. Shiro suddenly appears and tries to prevent Kanna from doing so. Kanna is surprised that Shiro can actually talk.

Outside of the shrine, Shiro explains that she is a messenger of the deities above, and explains that deities from all over the country gather above Izumo-taisha Shrine in Shimane, during the month of October, also known as Kannazuki in the lunar calendar, or Kamiarizuki according to the people in Izumo, to celebrate the annual harvest. She continues, telling Kanna that they must visit shrine deities along the way, collecting their feast offerings, before delivering them to Izumo by 7 o'clock at night, with the offerings stored inside of a magic gourd.

Shiro then urges Kanna to return to Ushijima Shrine, telling her to overcome her fear of the god. Kanna does so, and collects the cow god's offering, a giant mochi, before they continue on, visiting more shrine deities, collecting their feast offerings along the way. Far from Tokyo, Kanna and Shiro rest underneath a bridge over a river uncannily named after her. Kanna dreams about her mother again, and when she wakes up, Yasha appears again and steals her bracelet and the gourd. Kanna chases after Yasha and Yasha reveals that he comes from a long line of fast-running demon ancestors who were stripped of their status as deities by Ōkuninushi, the supreme deity who represents Izumo-taisha Shrine. Yasha challenges her in a race, which he wins, boasting that he can bring all of the offerings to Izumo in time before Shiro urges him that Kanna is the one who was asked to do so.

Kanna, Shiro, and Yasha continue on, collecting more offerings from the deities. They stop by Lake Suwa in Nagano at a location of Suwa-taisha Shrine next to it, where they meet the powerful Ryūjin, the dragon god and a son of Ōkuninushi. He tests Kanna, instructing her to jump her way toward the floating shrine. The floating shrine is revealed to be an illusion, and Kanna fails the test. Ryūjin deems Kanna unworthy, but he gives Kanna a ride on her back, asking her the truth behind her role as the Idaten. Kanna lies that she is to bring the feast offerings to Izumo, angering Ryūjin, who urges her to tell the truth. Kanna does so, telling Ryūjin that she only wants to see Yayoi again. Ryūjin understands her, relating to it by explaining that he had to sign a contract that bounded him to rule Lake Suwa, meaning that he could never see his father again, just like how Kanna can no longer see her mother after she died. Ryūjin then gives his offering to the three, a deluge of water from Lake Suwa before disappearing.

The three continue gathering offerings from shrines along the way before they collect the last offering from Kotoshironushi, a big sea bream, in Miho Shrine of Matsue. They camp out near the beach, before they run the last leg of their journey to Izumo. Kanna told Yasha about her mom's death from an illness after losing the marathon, because she wasn't fast enough and blames herself for it. As they went to sleep, Kanna suddenly hears her mother's voice and follows it to a secluded beach, where she is happy to see her, body and soul. This worries Shiro and Yasha, who track down Kanna to the same beach. Kanna daydreams about Yayoi not dying if she won the marathon, but it is all revealed to be a trick, as the Yayoi she was talking to, was Kanna's dark side taking Yayoi's form. Yasha tells the fake Yayoi that the real one wouldn't trick people like her. The fake Yayoi distorts her vision, under an evil aura, depicting Shiro and Yasha to her as terrifying monsters to prevent her from listening to their pleas. Yasha tries to stop the evil aura but gets wounded in the process. Shiro and Yasha scare away the fake Yayoi. They knew that it was a god imposter and try to tell Kanna to continue on her last leg to Izumo, but an unresponsive Kanna, is suddenly burdened to give up. She rips the bracelet off her wrist. Time itself resumes and Kanna loses the ability to communicate with both Shiro and Yasha. Shiro and Yasha both worry what would happen next, as the raindrops started falling down to the ground again. After what happened with the fake Yayoi, Shiro reveals to Yasha that the modern world has become cruel, with the dark side of the people emerging from them. Unless they would be able to overcome their hard feelings, their dark side would prey over it.

Suddenly, a typhoon emerges from out of nowhere, on track to make landfall over Shimane. A worried Norimasa calls emergency hotlines to find Kanna, who has been lost ever since she ran away from him in school. Kanna returns from the secluded beach, and while on the road back to the beach she, Shiro, and Yasha were camping at, she has a vision of the earlier dream she had in school, seeing that it ended with running becoming her passion, a passion that she lost after Yayoi's death. The vision continues, with Yayoi, herself, talking to Yasha near the river after a brief race with him, revealing that she is going to have a daughter. Yayoi gives birth, spending time with the newborn Kanna growing up before her untimely death after Kanna lost the marathon. After Yayoi's funeral, Kanna gets upset over the people gossiping about Yayoi, and runs away to the same shrine, crying about her.

After the vision, Kanna suddenly regains her lost passion for running, realizing that Yayoi was a descendant of the Idaten, who undertook the annual quest before tying up her hair with the torn bracelet. She continues running the last leg to Izumo. While Kanna is on the run, Shiro and Yasha are surprised to see her catch up. She motivates herself amid a group of people on the beach in Izumo during the typhoon, believing that she could still communicate with Shiro and Yasha, when in fact, she couldn't, after ripping off the bracelet. Running towards the beach where the path to the deities' world would appear, she realizes that she is too late. Kanna perseveres and realizes that she could still go to Izumo-taisha Shrine. Taking a detour from the road blocked with a car blown by the typhoon, she arrives at the shrine and climbs the glowing staircase to the deities' world that appeared before her, only to realize that the room where the deities would feast, was empty. She realized she was too late and she blamed herself for her mistake saying that she was never fast enough, but her bracelet suddenly reactivates, and Ōkuninushi suddenly appears. All of the shrine deities' offerings are taken out of the gourd and placed before the gods as food for them to feast on. Ōkuninushi thanks Kanna, Shiro, and Yasha, for their undertaking of the quest assigned to the Idaten, taking them back to the entrance of the shrine he rules over. Shiro asks Ōkuninushi to reward Kanna by letting her reunite with Yayoi, using matchmaking, but Ōkuninushi refuses, telling him that matchmaking cannot bring a person back to life, and time must pass even after what happened. Ōkuninushi returns to his world, and Kanna, along with Shiro and Yasha, return home to Tokyo.

Spring arrives, and Kanna, who has moved on ever since Yayoi's death, goes out of her apartment to take a run outside on the riverwalk, training herself for what's to come in the future.

== Voice cast ==
| Character | Japanese voice | English voice |
|---|---|---|
| Kanna Hayama | Aju Makita | Mia Sinclair Jenness |
| Kanna Hayama (child) | Aju Makita | Madeleine Morris |
| Shiro | Maaya Sakamoto | Luci Christian |
| Yato/Yasha | Miyu Irino | Mark Allen Jr. |
| Miki | Riko Nagase | Lilly Williams |
| Yayoi Hayama | Ko Shibasaki | Morgan Lauré |
| Norimasa Hayama | Arata Iura | Stephen Fu |
| Ōkuninushi | Akira Kamiya | Kirk Thornton |
| Kotoshironushi | Chafurin | Keith Silverstein |
| Ryūjin | Wataru Takagi | Michael Sorich |

== Production and release ==
The film was first revealed and funded through a series of three crowdfunding campaigns by Cretica Universal, which ran from March 27, 2019, to June 1, 2020. In May 2020, it was revealed the film would be delayed to 2021. It was also revealed that the film would be animated by Liden Films, with direction by Takana Shirai and scripts by Tetsurō Takita, Ryūta Miyake, and Toshinari Shinoe. Kazuya Sakamoto would serve as the film's creative director. Miwa performed the film's main theme, "Kanna". In August 2021, it was revealed the film would premiere in Japanese theaters on October 8, 2021. A preview of the film was shown at Anime Expo Lite 2021.

Netflix acquired international distribution rights and streamed the film on February 8, 2022.

== Reception ==
=== Critical response ===
On the review aggregator website Rotten Tomatoes, 100% of 6 critics' reviews are positive.
