= Kamigami no Asobi =

2013 visual novel and anime

- Ludere Deorum

神々の悪戯
- Genre: Reverse harem, romance, supernatural
- Video game

Kamigami no Asobi: Ludere Deorum
- Developer: Nippon Ichi Software
- Publisher: Broccoli
- Genre: Visual novel
- Platform: PlayStation Portable
- Released: JP: October 24, 2013
- Anime television series
- Directed by: Tomoyuki Kawamura
- Produced by: Fuminori Yamazaki; Sachi Kawamoto; Sayaka Konno; Atsunori Yoshida; Tomoko Sakaino
- Written by: Tomoko Konparu
- Music by: Elements Garden; Nagi Yanagi
- Studio: Brain's Base
- Licensed by: NA: Sentai Filmworks
- Original network: Tokyo MX
- Original run: April 5, 2014 – June 21, 2014
- Episodes: 12
- Video game

In Finite Ludere Deorum
- Developer: Nippon Ichi Software
- Publisher: Broccoli
- Genre: Visual novel
- Platform: PlayStation Portable, PlayStation Vita
- Released: JP: April 21, 2016

Ludere Deorum (神々の悪戯, Kamigami no Asobi; Latin and Japanese for "Play of Gods") is a Japanese visual novel by Nippon Ichi Software and Broccoli. It was released on October 24, 2013, for the PlayStation Portable. An anime television series adaptation by Brain's Base was announced in December 2013 and aired from April to June 2014. The opening theme for the anime was "Till the end" sung by Nagi Yanagi, while the ending theme for the anime was "Reason for..." sung by Miyu Irino, Daisuke Ono, Yuto Uemura, Toshiyuki Toyonaga, Hiroshi Kamiya, and Yoshimasa Hosoya. A second game, In Finite Ludere Deorum (神々の悪戯 IN FINITE, Kagami no Asobi InFinite; lit. 'The Last Play of Gods'), was released in April 2016. Ludere Deorum Unite Edition (神々の悪戯 Unite Edition), combining both games was released on January 27, 2022, for the Nintendo Switch.

== Gameplay ==
Ludere Deorum is classified as an otome game. Like most otome games, the player takes the role of the main female character, Yui Kusanagi, who can choose from a variety of male characters as her love interest.

== Plot ==
Yui Kusanagi is the daughter of a Shinto shrine priest. She discovers a mysterious sword, which transports her to a different world where she meets the Greek god Zeus. He invites her to attend a school in a separate world that he created. Zeus intends to teach the meaning of love to the various young divine beings who also attend the school, in an attempt to reverse the weakening bond between humans and the gods.

The second game shares the same premise, with new routes and new endings for the characters.

The first game allows Yui to romance Apollon, Hades, Tsukito, Takeru, Balder, Loki, Anubis, and Thoth, the first six being the anime's main cast. The second game allows Yui to romance Dionysus, Akira, Thor, and Melissa as well.

== Characters ==
Yui Kusanagi (草薙 結衣, Kusanagi Yui)
Voiced by: Saori Hayami
The main protagonist of the series. Yui is a normal high school girl approaching graduation, and is starting to get worried about her future. She's a little more traditional than most other girls due to her upbringing at a shrine. Yui regularly practices swordplay, and she is rather good at it. She is chosen as the one human to attend a school for gods who have grown distant from humans. She's now responsible for teaching gods about being human, and about love. Yui is a hardworking and focused girl when it comes to teaching the gods about current human life, and tries her best to educate them. She is very persuasive to the gods, as she managed to encourage Hades, Loki and Takeru to come to school, when they were absolutely uninterested in it. Selfless and caring, she is able to bond with the other gods well.

Apollon Agana Belea (アポロン・アガナ・ベレア, Aporon Agana Berea)
Voiced by: Miyu Irino
The Greek God of the Sun and Zeus's son. He is the only character who calls Yui 'Fairy' with the reason of Yui looking like one. He is very attached to and protective of Yui. He is carefree and happy-go-lucky type of person. He calls the other Gods with weird nicknames such as Bal-Bal for Balder Hringhorni and Dee-Dee for Dionysus Thyraos. He looks and behaves like a noble. He likes to be motivated by different things and is a charismatic leader, shown by the fact that he was elected as the student council president. He is very cheerful, but can be seen as overenthusiastic at times. He tends to say things twice regardless of the situation. Although he seems like a perfect guy, it still seems like something is lacking. He looks cheerful and bright, but he is actually very lonely. He tries to make friends wherever he goes by doing things for them. In the end, he falls in love with Yui.
Hades Aidoneus (ハデス・アイドネウス, Hadesu Aidoneusu)
Voiced by: Daisuke Ono
The Greek God of the Underworld. He is also said to have misfortune and often isolates himself from interacting with others. Quiet person and takes distances from other people. Apollon's uncle and Zeus' older brother. Likes sweet things. Thinks of himself as unlucky and cursed. He has an aura which makes everyone difficult to approach him. Despite being cold outside actually Hades is soft on the inside. He believes that coming close to him will bring misery to people, so he keeps everyone away from him. Due to the grudges held by the dead in the underworld, Hades has gained a curse that causes misfortune wherever he goes, hence he prefers to stay in the underworld away from contact.
Tsukito Totsuka (戸塚 月人, Totsuka Tsukito)
Voiced by: Yuto Uemura
Japanese God of the Moon – Tsukiyomi. He is quiet and sometimes painfully blunt. He is the big brother of Susanoo Totsuka Takeru, the Japanese God of the Sea. He always take notes about whatever Yui says regarding humans. He is assigned by Thoth Caduceus to be the disciplinary head. Tsukito seems cool, not interested in anything and rarely shows expressions. Nevertheless he is responsible and dutiful. Although he is an unsociable person, he somehow always gets involved with Apollon and gets dragged into the problem. He sees the idea of the school as just another task and tries to perform it without getting emotionally involved. He enjoys moon gazing, being god of the Moon.Like his brothers, Tsukito was born from Izanagi's washing of himself in the waters of Yomi. Nothing much about him has been revealed, except that he managed to calm Takeru's rampage, and received a rabbit charm from him at some point.
Takeru Totsuka (戸塚 尊, Totsuka Takeru)
Voiced by: Toshiyuki Toyonaga
Japanese God of the Sea – Susanoo God of the sea. Short tempered and brash, he often gets into fights without realising it. He calls Yui 雑草 (weed). However, he eventually likes and becomes protective of Yui after he finds that they have common interests, such as running or swordsmanship. He worships his elder brother Tsukito, but has a difficult relationship with Akira. Surprisingly, he can get emotional rather easily. Doesn't really get along well with anyone except Tsukito and Hades (whom he admires due to being the god of the underworld). He prides himself in swordplay and is very skilled in it. To calm down, he likes to take walks by the beach, being a god of the sea. Takeru finds animals cute, and sometimes plays with Tsukito's familiar, Usamaro. Takeru relates being born in the waters of Yomi together with his brothers. He lost his temper often, and was exiled because he was thought to have killed a goddess in anger. In reality, though, he loved the goddess in a maternal way and attempted (but failed) to save her as she accidentally fell off a cliff. Takeru also had a close relationship with Tsukito, after the former reaching out to him when he went on another rampage, Takeru began to look up to Tsukito.
Balder Hringhorni (バルドル・フリングホルニ, Barudoru Furinguhoruni)
Voiced by: Hiroshi Kamiya
Norse God of Light. Balder is a cheerful god who attracts every person to him because of his good looks. He often trips where there is nothing to be tripped on. He absolutely loves meat and will eat it for every meal if he could. Balder has a carnivorous personality and is very forward when it comes to making his advances on Yui. He cannot be harmed by any object because his mother Frigg made a pact with all objects on earth not to harm him. Even when there is rain, there comes a magical barrier that protects him from it. The only thing that could harm him is a mistletoe. Childhood friends with Thor Megingjard and Loki Laevatein. He has a special feelings for the heroine Yui, and becomes very possessive of her. He starts demanding that she eats with him every night, and gets jealous of anyone (even Loki) spending time with her. There are several instances where he expresses hostile and cruel thoughts about those who give or receive affections from Yui.
Loki Laevatein (ロキ・レーヴァテイン, Roki Rēvatein)
Voiced by: Yoshimasa Hosoya
Norse God of Fire. He is very attached to Balder and Thor. Due to him being very mischievous, people avoided him when he was young. He stated in Episode 7 that Balder should only look at him and Balder only belongs to him. He was the last one to know that Yui Kusanagi is a human who represents humanity. He calls her "kitty-cat" and truly hates her when he sees her spending time with Balder, but later softens up to her when he sees that she really wants to be his friend. He is a born prankster, is good at making weapons, and has a pocket full of candy and pranks. Lazy with most things but to things he finds interesting he goes all out. He is a person with unprecedented, unpredictable behavior. He makes mistakes with an unforgiving smile, innocent mass of evil. Genius in making problems anywhere, even in a School. The type of person that always want to know anything, even another person's problem. His mood is not easy to read. Loki was a notorious troublemaker in Asgard, so many shunned him and hated him. Balder was the only one who befriended Loki despite all his troubles, hence Loki sees Balder as a precious friend. Some mentioned memories include watching the aurora together with Thor, as well as walking along in the snow, since Asgard is said to be a very cold place.
Thor Megingjard (トール・メギンギョルズ, Tōru Megingyoruzu)
Voiced by: Noriaki Sugiyama
Norse God of Thunder. He is the one who stated that Balder and Loki shares a very special bond. Thor is a silent and stoic character who says few words. Yet he is very perceptive about people around him and is the voice of reason behind his two fellow Norse gods. He does care for them a lot, and is very worried about their impending fates.
Dionysus Thyrsos (ディオニュソス・テュルソス, Dionyusosu Tyurusosu)
Voiced by: Hirofumi Nojima
Greek God of Wine and Merrymaking. Dionysus is a charming flirt with a happy-go-lucky personality, even though he doesn't like to be told what to do. He is said to be warm but slightly crazy. He is sometimes seen appreciating wine. He seems to know a lot about the matters of love. He is said to be the brother of Apollon and nephew of Hades.
Thoth Caduceus (トト・カドゥケウス, Toto Kadukeusu)
Voiced by: Toshiyuki Morikawa
Egyptian God of Knowledge. God of wisdom and creation and responsible for awaking of the world. He is the type of guy who exerts a lot of pressure on his students. He loves corn to the point of having it for three meals every day, and spends most of his time in the library. Thoth has the ability to speed read and devour as much information from the books that he has read. He is responsible for the leadership and is a tutor in the school. Very proud and confident, he does not take consultations if he is not in the mood. Since he knows everything in the universe, he cannot be debated with. He seems very interested about the aspect of humanity and quizzes Yui about the meaning of these questions.
Zeus Keraunos (ゼウス・ケラウノス, Zeusu Keraunosu)
Voiced by: Hōchū Ōtsuka, Daisuke Sakaguchi (child form)
The Greek God of Sky and Thunder and The Ruler of Mount Olympus. Zeus is a very demanding man who gets what he wants with his power and words. Although seeming forceful and tyrannical, he keeps the future of humanity and gods in mind.
Anubis Ma'at (アヌビス・マアト, Anubisu Maato)
Voiced by: Yūki Kaji
Egyptian God of the Dead. Anubis has a straight ancient egyptian bob, with tufts resembling ears. Instead of the normal school uniform top he wears a skintight suit exposing the midriff, and wears his school blazer over it. He wears a striped belt around his waist and gladiator sandals. In deity his outfit is closer to ancient Egyptian clothing, and he grows jackal ears, tail and claws. Like the rest of the gods his eyes turn gold. Anubis is a shy deity who rarely appears in public and always hides in the shadows. Despite his shyness he has a curious side. He speaks unique words that only Thoth can understand. Only trusts Thoth at first, but opens up to the rest later on. He likes hanging around animals a lot, because he feels closer to them and they have no sin. He usually spends his time exploring outside or staying in the library with Thoth.
Melissa (メリッサ, Merissa)
Voiced by: Tomokazu Seki
A doll created by Zeus to look after Yui while at the school. He is a yellow and white rag doll with stitches around his mouth, neck, and limbs. His right eye is pink and his left eye is green. He has three marks in the middle of his forehead. His head is also tied like a sack with a green ribbon with a pink button. Melissa is a funny and relaxing doll to be around. He has a kind manner and is liked by the characters, especially Yui. Melissa is fun to be around and acts serious when there is a need to. He is very responsible. He is given a human form in the second game, with a blond ponytail, one green eye and one red eye.
Akira Totsuka (戸塚 陽, Totsuka Akira)
Voiced by: Yūya Uchida
Japanese God of the Sun. He is feminine in appearance, with long white hair that fades to blue. He is the older brother of Tsukito and Takeru. He is harsh on Tsukito but nice to Takeru, however Takeru dislikes his treatment of Tsukito. He is said to be already interested in the affairs of humans.

== Related books ==
=== Comical adaptation ===
Serialized in "Sylph (magazine)" (KADOKAWA ASCII Media Works) from the February 2012 issue to the October 2014 issue. Illustrated by Sumida Moto. 3 volumes in total.

No.	Release date	ISBN
1	October 22, 2013	978-4048919548
2	May 22, 2014	978-4048665841
3	October 21, 2014	978-4048669696

=== Comic Anthology ===
- Kamigami no Asobi Comic Anthology (KADOKAWA ASCII Media Works, released March 22, 2014, ISBN 978-4048664073)
- Kamigami no Asobi Anthology (KADOKAWA Enterbrain, released May 15, 2014, ISBN 978-4047297036)
- Kamigami no Asobi Official anime anthology (Frontier Works, released August 25, 2014, ISBN 978-4861347023)

=== Fan book ===
- Kamigami no Asobi Official Fan Book (KADOKAWA ASCII Media Works, released March 22, 2014, ISBN 978-4048662819)
- Anime Kamigami no Asobi Complete Fan Book (Gakken Publishing, released January 27, 2015, ISBN 978-4054062016)

== Anime ==
In January 2014, via Kadokawa's Dengeki Girls Style, an anime adaptation was announced.

On April 5, 2014, the first episode was aired on Crunchyroll and made available the following week. Sentai Filmworks later announced that they had licensed the anime. They released the series on DVD on August 25, 2015.

The anime has opening theme, "TILL THE END" performed by Nagi Yanagi and the ending theme, "REASON FOR..." are performed by the voice actors of Apollon, Hades, Tsukito, Takeru, Balder, and Loki.

No.	Title	Original release date
1	"The Forbidden Academy"; Transliteration: "Kinji Rateta Honikawa (Gakuen)" (Japanese: 禁じられた箱庭（がくえん）)	April 5, 2014
Normal high school girl Yui Kusanagi has been living a normal life in the shrine with her parents and brothers, until she stumbles upon a strange glowing sword in the store shed. By touching it, she is transported to another parallel world in the form of a school surrounded by beautiful gardens, with the sword miniaturised as a pendant around her neck. Zeus, the King of the Gods and maker of this universe, tells her that the bond between gods and humans, once intimate, have begun to weaken, which will only bring about disaster in the future. To avoid a terrible future, Zeus tasks Yui to teach the 8 gods gathered here in this school about the human heart.
2	"Beautiful Shackles"; Transliteration: "Utsukushiki Jubaku (Kase)" (Japanese: 美しき呪縛（かせ）)	April 12, 2014
Yui meets the 8 gods: The Greek God of the Sun Apollon Agana Belea, The Greek God of the Underworld Hades Aidoneus, Greek God of Wine and Merrymaking Dionysus Thyrsos, Japanese God of the Moon Tsukito Totsuka, Japanese God of the Sea Takeru Totsuka, Norse God of Light Balder Hringhorni, Norse God of Fire Loki Laevatein, and Norse God of Thunder Thor Megingjard. Some of them are kind and friendly to her whilst some are hostile. Gathered in the hall, Zeus explains the situation to all of them, decreeing that they cannot leave this universe until they graduate, which can only be done so under two conditions: the container on the chandelier is filled to indicate their knowledge, and the jewellery shackles binding the gods' powers disintegrate of their own accord. Appointing Thoth Caduceus, the Egyptian God of Knowledge, as their teacher, school officially begins with the entrance ceremony.
3	"Sea Breeze Conflict"; Transliteration: "Kaifū no Kattō (Isakai)" (Japanese: 海風の葛藤（いさかい）)	April 19, 2014
Thoth suddenly announces that tomorrow is summer vacation, as per Zeus' decision to change the season. Although several gods play truant, the others manage to arouse their interest in school by starting a seaside school, in hopes of showing them the fun side of school. The changing of the season again -- this time to autumn -- forces them to warm up in a nearby house instead. As Apollon tries to make seaside school fun even in autumn, Thor and Loki decide to leave, claiming that he has no right to order them around because he is a student as well. This prompts Yui to give him the title of 'Student Council President'. Apollon, pleased, finds the way to make seaside school fun by ending the night with fireworks purchased from the school store, which sells everything and anything.
4	"The Curse of Hades"; Transliteration: "Meiō no Fukō (Noroi)" (Japanese: 冥王の不幸（のろい）)	April 26, 2014
Yui, in line with Zeus' attempt to model the school after human schools, decides to introduce club activities, something that Thoth decides to make compulsory as well. While everyone is excited and interested, Hades refuses to participate in group activities. Yui later finds out that while Hades is constantly gloomy and introverted, he enjoys stargazing. Despite his claims that misfortune will befall her if she gets too close, Yui refuses to leave him alone, especially after he saves her from drowning. From Apollon and Dionysus, she makes Hades' favourite strawberry rice cakes to cheer him up, prompting him to reveal a hideous tattoo on his upper chest caused from the grudges of many that regret their deaths -- the cause of misfortune. As he once again rejects her, Yui believes that he is looking out for everyone's sake by isolating himself, and determines to make him happy. The following day, Hades goes stargazing alone until Yui arrives, bringing the other gods along. While misfortune strikes and it begins raining, everyone simply changes into their swimsuits and have fun together. Hades realises that no matter how unlucky he is, there are people who still care for him.
5	"The Unforgivable Heart"; Transliteration: "Yurusa Rezaru Gekijō (Kokoro)" (Japanese: 許されざる激情（こころ）)	May 3, 2014
Thoth orders Yui to make Takeru, who has yet to join a club, do so. This proves difficult with his rough attitude and hostile temperament, until he notices her practising swordplay. Takeru, claiming that Yui is only wanting him to join a club so she can graduate and leave, decides to make a deal with her: if she can win, he will join a club willingly. Yui loses the duel, to which Takeru believes it is because she is weak at her training, unlike him that jobs every morning. She decides to follow him on his morning runs to train and hopefully gain a better understanding of him. Their relationship gets better, until one rainy morning when Takeru, thinking Yui wouldn't run in the rain, goes on ahead without her. In her attempt to find him, Yui falls down a cliff and is saved by him in his godly form, having broken the shackle. At that, Zeus suspends Takeru, but Yui claims that he was showing human emotion by saving her, and thus did nothing wrong. With the support of the other gods, Zeus gives in, and Takeru realises that she is actually a strong girl.
6	"The Moonlight's Feelings"; Transliteration: "Gekkō no Yubiwa (Kimochi)" (Japanese: 月光の指輪（きもち）)	May 10, 2014
Tsukito has been chosen as a disciplinary member, but because of his eagerness to fulfil his responsibilities, he loses sleep and faints. Thoth threatens him that if he does something like this again he will be suspended, making Tsukito extremely depressed and determined to find out the reason for his mistakes. In response, Loki mischievously gives Tsukito and Yui a pair of lovers' rings that glue their hands together, and is unremovable until they gain a deep understanding of each other's hearts. Both of them connect over preparing for a Moon-Viewing Festival, to which Tsukito reveals how he only fulfils his duties and never enjoys anything, much to Yui's horror. The rings finally break off when Tsukito admits that he found preparing things with her fun.
7	"Promise of the Frozen Wastes"; Transliteration: "Setsugen no Yakusoku (Chikai)" (Japanese: 雪原の約束（ちかい）)	May 17, 2014
Balder grows more attached to Yui because of her uniqueness in not being affected by his natural charisma as the Norse God of Light. As the season changes once again to winter, Yui and the gods decide to create a cultural festival based on Christmas, splitting into groups based on their heritage. Since Yui is Japanese, she has to work with the Japanese gods, much to Balder's jealousy. He drags her around with him everywhere, until Loki is absolutely frustrated, confronting his friend about a promise they made as children to always stay together no matter what, believing that Yui is coming between their friendship.
8	"The Solitude of Light"; Transliteration: "Hikaritaru Senbō (Ko Doku)" (Japanese: 光たる羨望（こどく）)	May 24, 2014
Yui has been trying to avoid Balder and Loki after their argument. Despite Loki telling her to stay away from Balder for her own safety, the latter successfully takes her away and attempts to seduce her. When Loki finds them and Balder goes on a rampage. Knowing that there is no hiding it from Yui, he explains how Balder possesses an inborn power as a God of Destruction, which will be released when his emotions grow unstable, making him act differently, although he wakes up with no memories of it after. As the rest of the gods release lanterns into the sky, oblivious to what is happening, Loki tells Thor that he will kill Balder.
9	"Dark Prison of Scattered Flowers"; Transliteration: "Kuraki Hana Chiru Meikyū (Ori)" (Japanese: 昏き花散る迷宮（おり）)	May 31, 2014
6 months have passed, and one fine day Thoth suddenly declares that mid-term exams are in 3 days, shocking Yui. They attempt to study together using Tsukito's perfect notes, but a Yui has been experiencing strange dreams of Apollon's past, while Apollon has been losing sleep as well. From the dreams, Yui finds out about a woman named Cassandra that Apollon loved so much to the point where he gave her a part of his divine power to see the future, until she committed suicide much to his anguish. Hades, knowing that Cassandra's spirit never entered the underworld, worries that she holds a grudge against Apollon and is wandering in the human world to haunt him. However, this proves to be the opposite as Cassandra possesses Yui's body to convey her true feelings to Apollon, freeing him from his long-term grief and breaking his shackle, allowing him to graduate. Everyone forgets about their exams until Tsukito reminds them, to which they have done no studying.
10	"Lovely and Ephemeral"; Transliteration: "Aisubeki Nichijō (Utakata)" (Japanese: 愛すべき日常（うたかた）)	June 7, 2014
Despite not studying, the gods and Yui have fared pretty well on their exams, so Zeus gives them to "honour" of putting on a play for the rest of the students, who are spirits summoned by him. Per Yui's suggestion, they decide to enact the fairytale of Cinderella, with everyone competing for the main male part of the Prince until they draw lots. The play goes smoothly until Loki tries to stage a coup d'etat and Anubis Ma'at, the Egyptian God of the Dead, steals some of Dionysus' homemade juice and crashes into the stage. Despite the havoc wrecked, all the students appear to have enjoyed the play.
11	"Chains of Fate"; Transliteration: "Shukumei no Rōgoku (Kusari)" (Japanese: 宿命の牢獄（くさり）)	June 14, 2014
Balder collapses suddenly after the play. As Apollon and Yui visit him in the infirmary, they overhear Loki telling Thor about he will kill Balder, much to their shock. Loki explains that whenever there is light, there will also be darkness, which rests as an inborn power within Balder as the God of Destruction. When Balder awakens, he realises Loki's aims and accepts his death as a dangerous being. However, Loki is unable to do so, prompting Balder to jump off a cliff instead and commit suicide.
12	"Eternal Separation"; Transliteration: "Eien no Shūshifu (Wakare)" (Japanese: 永遠の終止符（わかれ）)	June 21, 2014
Balder awakens as the God of Destruction and the universe starts to collapse with the immensity of power. The remaining gods have their shackles broken through human acts of emotion in the midst of chaos and transform to rescue their friend. Zeus dissolves the spirit students as he attempts to use his power to keep the universe intact. Yui, wanting to help, uses the sword to absorb the knowledge and feelings contained within the chandelier's container, which is now full, and gives it to Loki. While Balder is saved, the universe is beginning to collapse despite Zeus channeling energy into it. The 8 gods make a decision to use their remaining power in returning Yui to her universe, each one thanking her for teaching them and Apollon confessing his love for her. Yui returns to her time at the exact same moment she left, and can now only look on the memories her new friends have given her. In an ending scene, Yui looks to find the gods standing before her shrine home, dressed in modern attire, and request that she teach them again.
