= Kamiyu =

Japanese group

- Origin: Japan
- Genres: J-pop; anime song
- Years active: 2010–present
- Label: Kiramune
- Members: Hiroshi Kamiya; Miyu Irino
- Website: kiramune.jp/artist/KAmiYU/

Kamiyu (stylized as KAmiYU) is a Japanese group formed in 2010 by voice actors Hiroshi Kamiya and Miyu Irino.

== History ==
Kamiyu was formed in 2010 by voice actors Hiroshi Kamiya and Miyu Irino on the label Kiramune. The two held their first event, titled Kamiyu in Wonderland, on July 18, 2010. The two also performed the song "My Proud, My Play!" as the ending theme song to Model Suit Gunpla Builders Beginning G, to which they also provided the voices to the characters. From November 6 to 7, 2010, they participated in Kiramune Music Festival 2010. The event exclusively sold their first single, "Kokoro no Tobira." On May 15, 2015, Kamiyu released their second single "Reason" as the ending theme song to Karneval, in which Kamiya also starred in as Gareki.

On March 10, 2018, Kamiyu performed at Kiramune Music Festival 2018. On September 1, 2018, Kamiyu held their fourth concert, Kamiyu in Wonderland 4, their first event in five years.

== Members ==
- Hiroshi Kamiya
- Miyu Irino

== Discography ==
=== Extended plays ===
List of extended plays, with selected chart positions, sales figures and certifications
Title	Year	EP details	Peak chart positions	Sales
Title	Year	EP details	JPN	Sales
Link-Up	2011	Released: August 3, 2011; Label: Kiramune; Formats: CD	13	—
Road to Wonderland	2013	Released: December 11, 2013; Label: Kiramune; Formats: CD	13	—
Happy-Go-Lucky	2018	Released: August 22, 2018; Label: Kiramune; Formats: CD	6	—
"—" denotes releases that did not chart or were not released in that region.

=== Singles ===
List of singles, with selected chart positions, sales figures and certifications
Title	Year	Peak chart positions	Sales	Album
Title	Year	JPN	Sales	Album
"Kokoro no Tobira" (心の扉)	2010	29		Non-album singles
"Reason"	2013	13		Non-album singles
"Mellow×Mellow"	2025	5	JPN: 7,857	Non-album singles
"—" denotes releases that did not chart or were not released in that region.
