= Yoshinogawa-Tsuboro Prefectural Natural Park =

Natural park of Nara prefecture, Japan

- 県立吉野川津風呂自然公園
- Location within Nara Prefecture Location within Japan
- Location: Nara Prefecture, Japan
- Coordinates: 34.4°N 135.9°E
- Area: 24.62 km^{2} (9.51 sq mi)
- Established: 28 April 1972

Yoshinogawa-Tsuboro Prefectural Natural Park (県立吉野川津風呂自然公園, Kenritsu Yoshinogawa-Tsuboro shizen kōen) is a Prefectural Natural Park in central Nara Prefecture, Japan. Established in 1972, the park spans the borders of the municipalities of Yoshino, Shimoichi, Ōyodo, and Gojō. The park extends along the Yoshino River, encompasses lake Tsuboro, and borders an area of the Yoshino-Kumano National Park.

== See also ==
- National Parks of Japan
- Yoshino-Kumano National Park
