= Twenty-five Kansai flower temples =

Association of Japanese Buddhist temples

The twenty-five Kansai flower temples (Japanese: 関西花の寺二十五カ所) or twenty-five sacred Kansai flower temples (Japanese: 関西花の寺二十五霊場) are a multi-sect association of twenty-five Japanese Buddhist temples in the Kansai region that are known for their flower and foliage displays. The organization was founded in 1993 and includes temples in the Hyōgo, Kyoto, Nara, Osaka, Shiga, and Wakayama Prefectures.

The abbots of each temple provide large groups of 10 or more a Buddhist flower sermon, and the flower temples are common destinations for hanami (flower viewing) as well as pilgrimages which can include collecting shuin (seal stamps) from each of the temples.

The abbots of each of the twenty-five temples gather annually to hold a flower ceremony at one of the temples.

== Temples ==
Number	Temple	Sect	City	Prefecture	Main flowers
1	Kannon-ji	Kōyasan Shingon-shū	Fukuchiyama	Kyoto Prefecture	Hydrangea, autumn leaves
2	Rion-ji	Kōyasan Shingon-shū	Ayabe	Kyoto Prefecture	Lotus, azalea
3	Kongō-in	Toji Shingon	Maizuru	Kyoto Prefecture	Autumn leaves
4	Kōgen-ji	Rinzai	Asuka	Hyōgo Prefecture	Autumn leaves
5	Kōshō-ji	Shingon	Yabu	Hyōgo Prefecture	Magnolia liliiflora, Lespedeza bicolor
6	Ryukoku-ji	Sōtō	Toyooka	Hyōgo Prefecture	Tree peony
7	Nyoi-ji	Kōyasan Shingon-shū	Kyōtango	Kyoto Prefecture	Azalea
8	Oshi-ji	Tendai	Fukusaki	Hyōgo Prefecture	Sara
9	Kakurin-ji	Tendai	Kakogawa	Hyōgo Prefecture	Sara, Tilia miqueliana
10	Tenjō-ji	Shingon	Kobe	Hyōgo Prefecture	Sara, Hydrangea macrophylla
11	Youtaku-ji	Sōtō	Sanda	Hyōgo Prefecture	Japanese iris
12	Kuan-ji	Kōyasan Shingon-shū	Ikeda	Osaka Prefecture	Hydrangea, tree peony, autumn leaves
13	Hōkongō-in	Risshū	Kyoto	Kyoto Prefecture	Cherry blossom, lotus
14	Kōshō-ji	Sōtō	Takashima	Shiga Prefecture	Japanese camellia
15	Gansen-ji	Shingon Risshu	Kizugawa	Kyoto Prefecture	Hydrangea
16	Jōruri-ji	Shingon Risshu	Kizugawa	Kyoto Prefecture	Japanese andromeda
17	Hannya-ji	Shingon Risshu	Nara	Nara Prefecture	Cosmos
18	Byakugō-ji	Shingon Risshu	Nara	Nara Prefecture	Japanese camellia, Lespedeza bicolor
19	Chōgaku-ji	Kōyasan Shingon-shū	Tenri	Nara Prefecture	Azalea
20	Sekkou-ji	Jōdo-shū	Katsuragi	Nara Prefecture	Tree peony, Chinese peony
21	Taima-dera	Kōyasan Shingon-shū	Karsuragi	Nara Prefecture	Hymenanthes, tree peony, autumn leaves
22	Senshuku-ji	Kōyasan Shingon-shū	Gose	Nara Prefecture	Rhododendron (several types)
23	Kongou-ji	Shingon	Gojō	Nara Prefecture	Tree peony
24	Koyasu Jizou-ji	Kōyasan Shingon-shū	Hashimoto	Wakayama Prefecture	Japanese wisteria
25	Kanshin-ji	Kōyasan Shingon-shū	Kawachinagano	Osaka Prefecture	Japanese plum, Autumn leaves
