= Sabine Sommerkamp-Homann =

German journalist and author

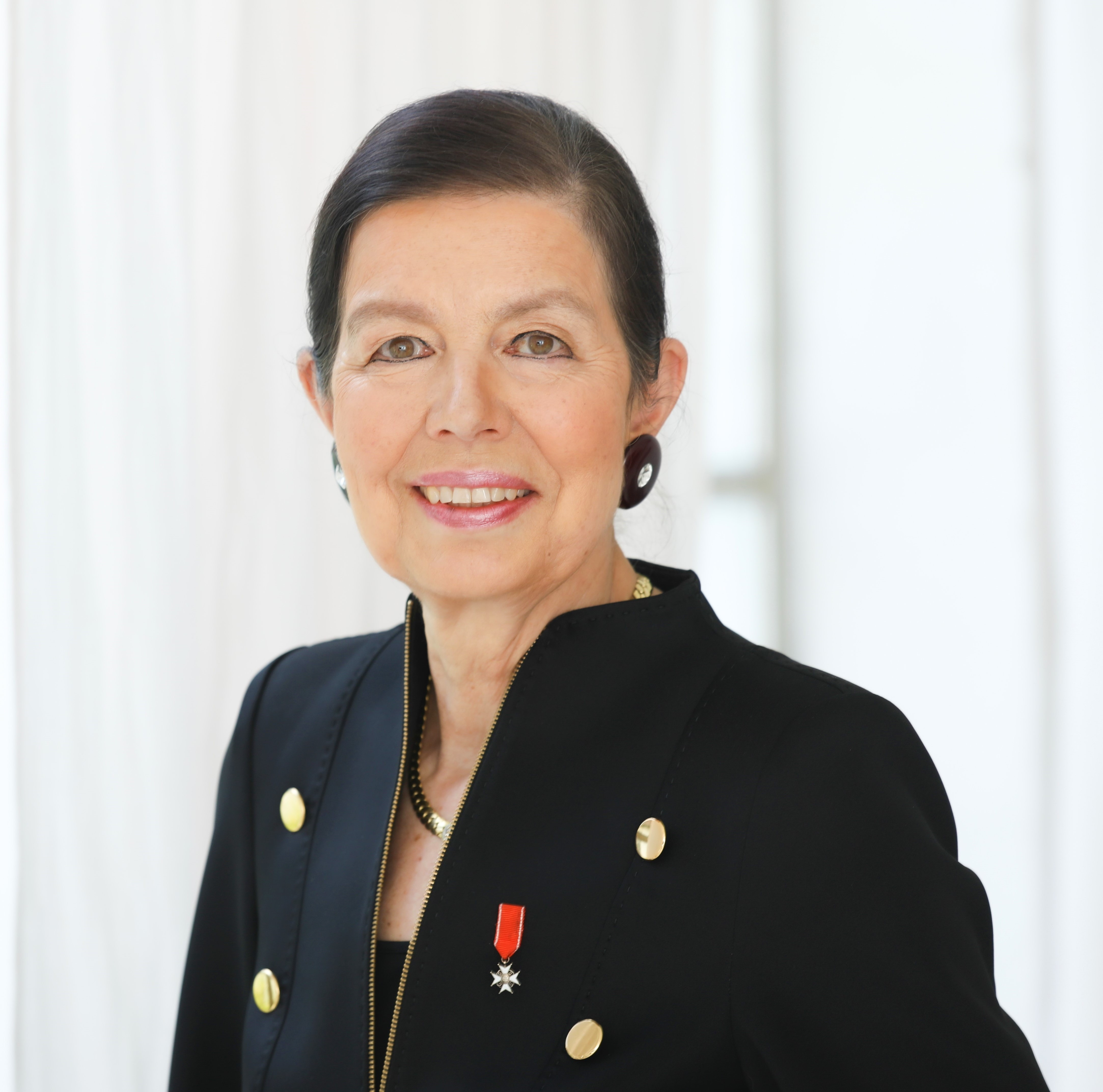
Sabine Sommerkamp-Homann, 2022

Sabine Sommerkamp-Homann (born 15 June 1952, in Hamburg, Germany) is a German philologist, journalist and author. Since 1997, she has served as the Honorary Consul of the Republic of Latvia.

In 2010 she was awarded the Latvian Cross of Recognition by President Valdis Zatlers.

Sommerkamp-Homann is married to the entrepreneur Klaus Homann and has one son.

== Education ==
Sommerkamp-Homann studied German, English and American studies, pedagogy, comparative religious studies, and Japanese literature at the universities of Bonn and Hamburg, Germany, and the University of Hull, UK. In 1984 she received her PhD with a dissertation on Japanese haiku and its influence on Western poetry and culture.

== Career ==
=== Journalism and media ===
From 1982 to 1986 Sommerkamp-Homann trained and worked as an editor for NDR television.

=== Corporate sector ===
From 1986 to 1991 she was deputy corporate spokesperson, and from 1991 to 2009 head of strategic target groups at Beiersdorf AG.

== Literary and artistic contributions ==
=== Haiku and literature ===
Sommerkamp-Homann is recognized as an expert on German and international haiku poetry. In 2023, Iudicium published her dissertation "Der Einfluss des Haiku auf Imagismus und jüngere Moderne. Studien zur englischen und amerikanischen Lyrik" ("The Influence of the Haiku on Imagism, Modern Art and Literature. Studies of English and American Poetry"). In a review on "Haiku heute," Rüdiger Jung describes the dissertation as a standard work (Standardwerk) highlighting its extensive material, including over 900 cited references and numerous interviews with key figures such as Allen Ginsberg and Gary Snyder.

She also writes tanka and other forms of poetry and prose.

In 1981, at "apropos – Zeitschrift für Kunst, Literatur, Kritik," she founded "Haiku-Spektrum," the first regularly published forum for German-language and international haiku poetry in Germany, which she edited until 1985. She also acted as vice-president of the "German Senryū Center" ("Deutsches Senryū-Zentrum") from 1981 to 1988, helping to found a society for haiku poetry and the German Haiku Society Deutsche Haiku-Gesellschaft e.V.) in 1988.

Haiku was also increasingly introduced into German-language school teaching through Sabine Sommerkamp's haiku fairy tale "Die Sonnensuche" ("Searching for the Sun"), published in 1990 and also introduced as a textbook for German classes throughout Hungary in 1992. In Latvia (2004) and China (1999), the haiku fairy tale for young people and adults, published in the local language, continues to promote haiku abroad.

In Japan Sabine Sommerkamp was given the poetic name "Szala," after the character of her poems and in reference to the Japanese summer camellia, which, with its delicate white flowers, is considered the "Tree of Enlightenment".

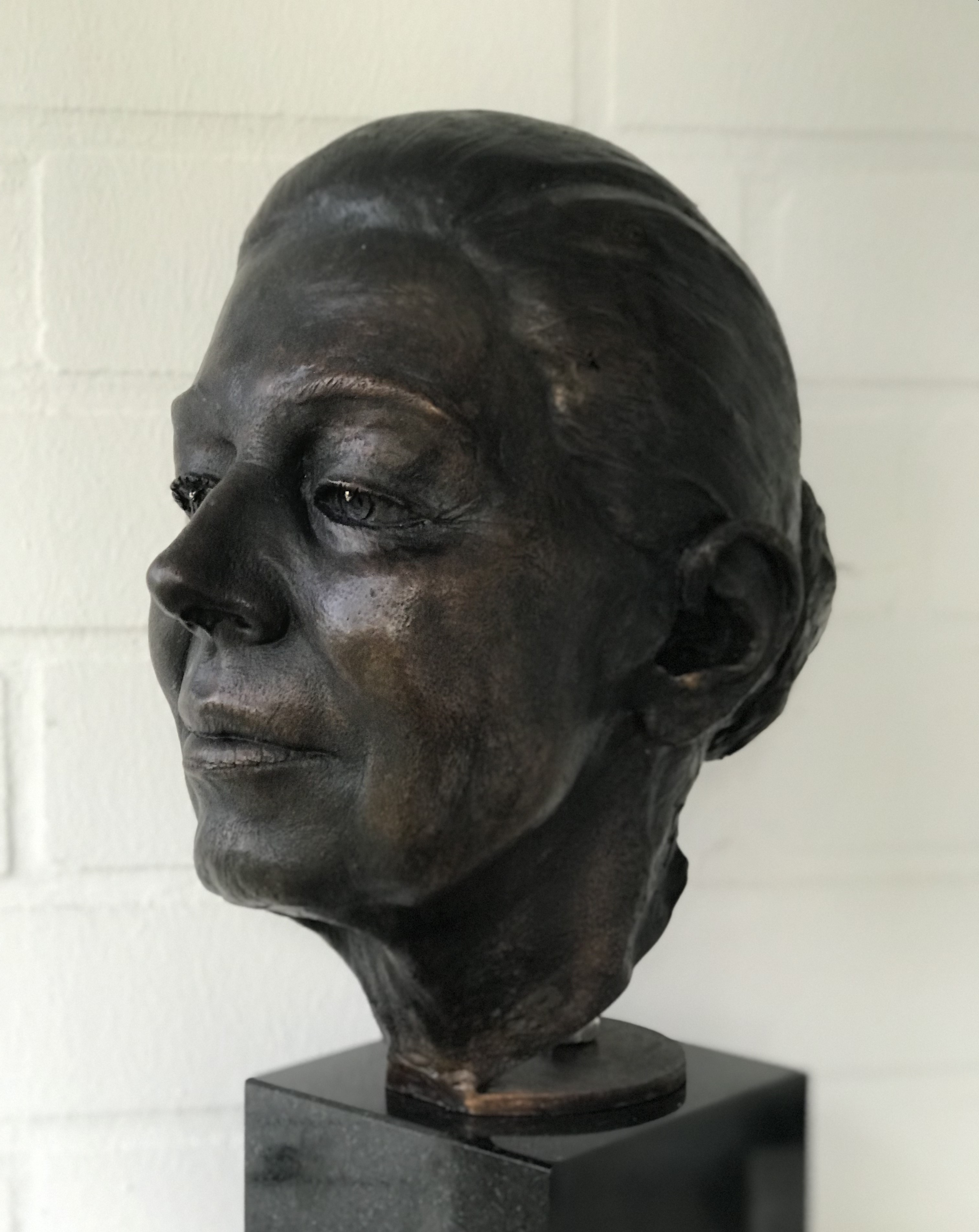
Bronze head of Sabine Sommerkamp-Homann, 2022. Artist; Claudia Guderian

=== Music and painting ===
In addition to her literary work, Sommerkamp-Homann is a singer and an active painter.

Her record "Back in Time – Songs from the 1930s to the '60s" contains 17 studio recordings from 2008 to 2011, two of them with the Latvian vocal ensemble "Framest", with the net proceeds going to SOS Children's Villages of Latvia.

In 2014 the Alsterverlag Hamburg published the illustrated book "Sabine Sommerkamp Paintings 2003–2013" with 40 works from a decade.

== Diplomatic service ==
In 1997 Sommerkamp-Homann was appointed Honorary Consul of the Republic of Latvia in Hamburg, Germany, focusing on economic, cultural, scientific, tourism and social issues.

In this capacity she works to enhance economic, cultural, scientific, tourism, and social relations between Latvia and Germany. She has been instrumental in organizing cultural exchange events such as the "Riga Days in Hamburg" and "Hamburg Days in Riga," which have helped to foster closer ties between the two cities, and in leading negotiations to reintroduce continuous direct flights with the Latvian national airline airBaltic between Hamburg and Riga (2000–2003).

She provided the idea and the concept for realizing the "Richard Wagner Days in Riga" (in cooperation with the Latvian National Opera and the Latvian Academy of Culture) with the participation of Wolfgang Wagner and Gudrun Wagner, 2004, 2006, and 2009.

== Honors ==
- Senator h.c. of the Latvian Academy of Culture, 2002
- Latvian Cross of Recognition
- Consul of the year (Konsulin des Jahres), 2010

== Publications (selection) ==
- ''Dārza sirdī. Tankas un haiku. Im Herzen des Gartens. Tanka und Haiku.'' Latvian-German edition. Jumava publishing house, Riga, 2025, ISBN 978-9934-20-732-7
- Lichtgedanken. Gedichte (Thoughts on Light. Poems), with a foreword by Bishop Kirsten Fehrs and contributions by Rüdiger Jung and Michael Batz. Steinmann-Verlag, Preetz, 2025, ISBN 978-3-927043-947
- Im Herzen des Gartens. Tanka und Haiku (In the Heart of the Garden. Tanka and Haiku), reprint and expansion of the first edition from 1993, (Graphikum), Rotkiefer, 2024, paperback ISBN 978-3-949029-23-3, hardcover ISBN 978-3-949029-26-4
- Der Einfluss des Haiku auf Imagismus und jüngere Moderne. Studien zur englischen und amerikanischen Lyrik (The Influence of the Haiku on Imagism, Modern Art and Literature. Studies of English and American Poetry), Phil. Diss. Universität Hamburg 1984, reprinted from the 1984 edition, revised and expanded with an afterword, Iudicium, 2023, ISBN 978-3-86205-603-3, E-Book / PDF, 2023, ISBN 978-3-86205-974-4. The dissertation has been translated into Japanese by Kenji Takeda since 1986 and published chapter by chapter at Kobe-Gakuin University
- 17 Ansichten des Berges Fuji – Bilder und Tanka / ザビーネ・ゾマーカンプ 富士17景―写真と短歌 (17 Views of Mount Fuji – Pictures and Tanka), language: German – Japanese, translated from the German by Kenji Takeda, afterword: Prof. Klaus Peter Nebel, introduction: Dietrich Krusche, 60 pages, bound, with 22 color images, Iudicium, München, 2021, ISBN 978-3-86205-545-6
- 17 skati uz Fudži kalnu – Fotoattēli un tankas / 17 Ansichten des Berges Fuji – Bilder und Tanka (17 Views of Mount Fuji – Pictures and Tanka), language: Latvian – German, translated from the German by Anita Muitiniece, introduction: Dietrich Krusche, afterword: Prof. Klaus Peter Nebel, 56 pages with 22 color images, Jumava, Riga, 2020, ISBN 978-9934-20-390-9
- Die Sonnensuche – Ein Haiku-Märchen (Searching for the Sun, A Haiku Fairy Tale), with pictures by Irene Müller, Christophorus, Freiburg i.Br., 1990. In 2022 Iudicium took over distribution, ISBN 978-3-86205-557-9. Also published in China in 1999 and Lettland in 2004 in the local language:
  - Zhuixun taiyang (Searching for the Sun), Wang Taizhi/Shen Huizhu tr., " Deyizha mingjia tonghua" (Tales of the German Masters), Beijing: Haitun chubanshe Waiwen chubanshe, 1999, pp. 386–435, ISBN 7-80138-143-2
  - Saules Meklejumos, Jumava, Riga, 2004, ISBN 9984-05-857-3
- Paintings 2003–2013. Malerei, afterword: Prof. Klaus Peter Nebel, Alsterverlag, Hamburg, 2014, 2nd edition 2016, ISBN 978-3-941808-11-9
- Back in Time. Songs from the 1930s to the '60s, Whiterock Records, 2012
