= Chōgaku-ji =

Buddhist temple in Tenri, Japan

- 長岳寺
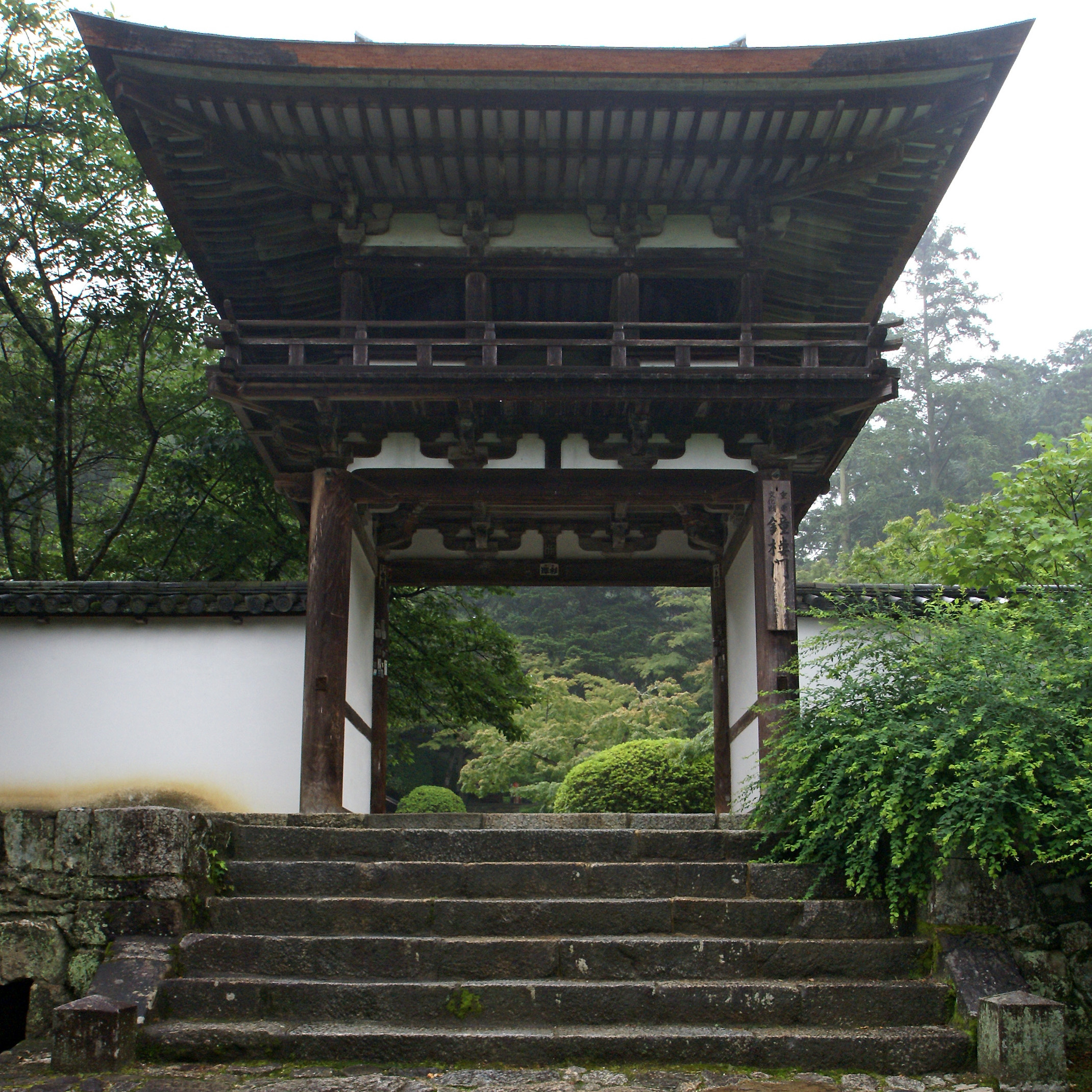
- Chōgaku-ji's Rōmon (tower gate)

- Location within Nara Prefecture Location within Japan

Religion
- Affiliation: Buddhist
- Sect: Kōyasan Shingon-shū
- Prefecture: Nara

Location
- Municipality: Tenri
- Country: Japan
- Interactive map of Chōgaku-ji
- Prefecture: Nara
- Coordinates: 34°33′39″N 135°51′07″E

Architecture
- Founder: Kūkai
- Established: 824

Website
- chogakuji.or.jp (Japanese)

Chōgaku-ji (Japanese: 長岳寺) is a Japanese Buddhist temple of the Kōyasan Shingon-shū sect in the city of Tenri in Nara Prefecture, Japan. It is located within Yamato-Aogaki Quasi-National Park along the Yamanobe no michi (Japanese: 山辺の道), the oldest road in Japan, at the foot of Mt. Ryūō in the Sanuki Mountains. The temple is the fourth of the thirteen Buddhist sites of Yamato, and the nineteenth of the twenty-five Kansai flower temples.

== History ==
Chōgaku-ji was built by Kūkai in 824. The temple's bell tower gate (rōmon) is the oldest in Japan. The gate was originally built in the Heian period when the temple was founded, and is the only building that remains of the originals at Chōgaku-ji. The upper portion of the gate was rebuilt between 1086 and 1184, and the lower portion was rebuilt between 1573 and 1614. The gate is in a Kibitsu-zukuri-style with a thin wood shingle roof.

== Cultural artifacts ==
Chōgaku-ji has four structures and five statues that have been designated as national important cultural properties. The bell tower gate was designated a national important cultural property in 1907. Jizō-in is a dō (Japanese: 堂, lit. 'hall') that was built in 1631, and was designated a national important cultural property in 1969. Behind Jizō-in is its kuri (kitchen), which was built in 1930 and was designated a national important cultural property in 1955.

Gochidō is an open pagoda built between 1275 and 1332 in the late Kamakura period, which was designated a national important cultural property in 1908. The pagoda's frame has no walls and is adorned with Sanskrit lettering, and is supported by a large central pillar (called a shinbashira).
