= Kakurin-ji (Katsura) =

Kakurin-ji (Japanese: 鶴林寺) is a Kōyasan Shingon temple in Katsura, Tokushima Prefecture, Japan. It is Temple #20 on the Shikoku 88 temple pilgrimage. The main image is of Jizō Bosatsu.

== Overview ==
Affectionately known to locals and pilgrims alike as "O-tsuru-san," this temple is counted among the most arduous challenges in the Awa region—often cited in the traditional saying, "First Shōsan-ji, second Kakurin-ji, and third Tairyū-ji." It is situated near the summit of Mt. Kakurin-ji (elevation 516.1 m); the temple grounds themselves stand at an elevation of 467 m.The Omotesando is a steep mountain path known as "Henro-korogashi."

== History ==
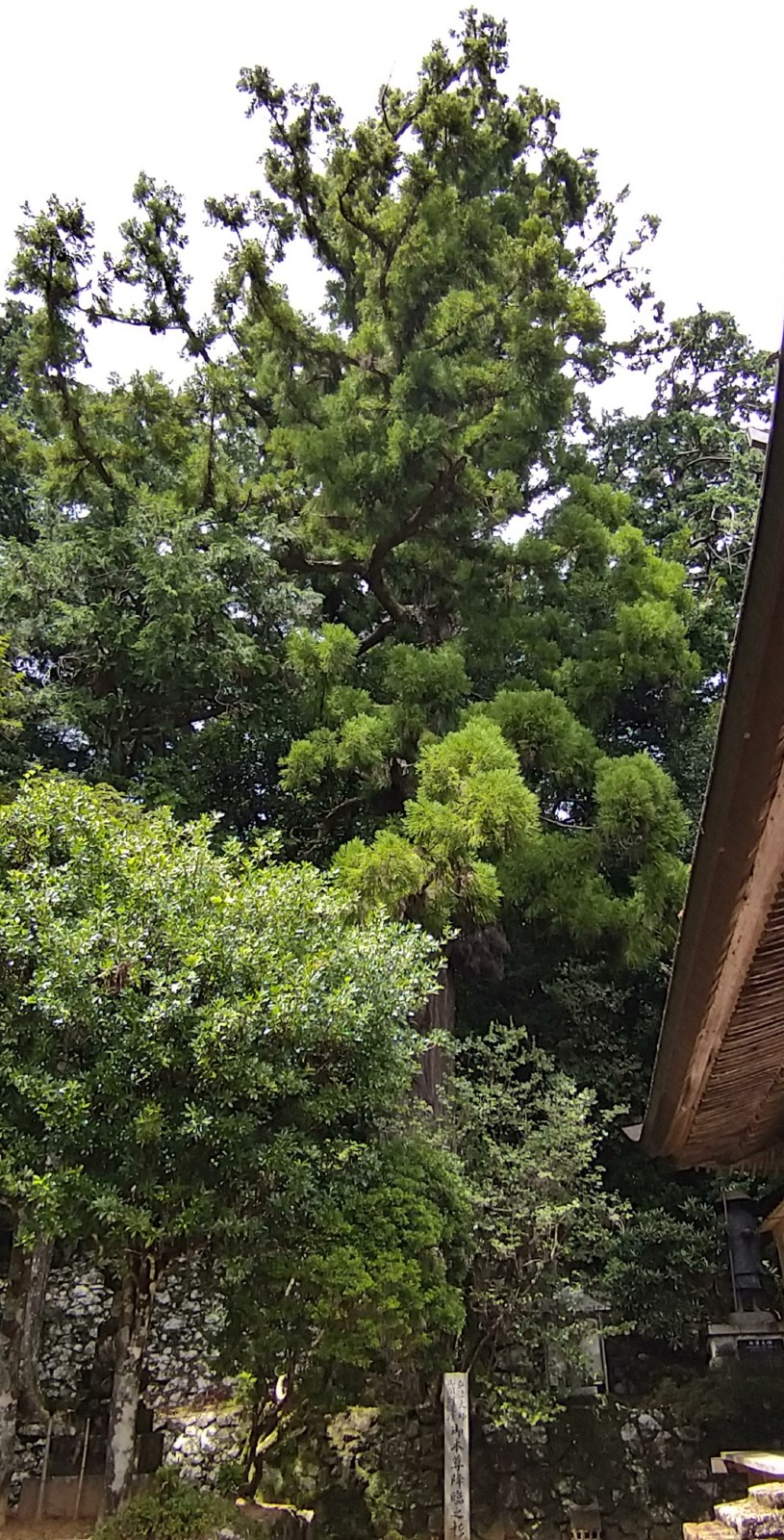
The Cedar of the Main Deity's Descent

According to temple legend, the temple was founded in the 17th year of the Enryaku era (798) by Kūkai (Kōbō-Daishi) in accordance with an imperial vow made by Emperor Kanmu. The legend recounts that while Kūkai was undergoing ascetic training on this mountain, a pair of white cranes—a male and a female—were found guarding a small golden statue of Jizō Bodhisattva atop the branches of a cedar tree. Upon witnessing this, Kūkai carved a Jizō Bodhisattva statue measuring three *shaku* (approximately 90 cm) from the sacred wood of the cedar; he then enshrined the 1.8-*sun* Jizō statue that the cranes had been guarding within the hollow interior of the larger figure, designating it as the temple's principal deity. It is said that the temple was subsequently named Kakurin-ji—meaning "Crane Forest Temple"—because the atmosphere of the temple grounds bore a resemblance to Vulture Peak (Gridhrakuta), the sacred mountain where Shakyamuni Buddha delivered his sermons.

The temple flourished greatly, receiving the fervent devotion of Emperor Heizei, Emperor Saga, and Emperor Junna, as well as the patronage of figures such as Minamoto no Yoritomo, Minamoto no Yoshitsune, and Hachisuka Iemasa—the founder of the Tokushima Domain.

A specific legend regarding the principal deity tells of a hunter who once entered the mountain in pursuit of a wild boar. He loosed an arrow at his prey, but upon following its trajectory, he discovered that the arrow had instead struck the chest of the Jizō Bodhisattva statue housed in the Main Hall, causing it to bleed. Overcome with remorse for his act of taking a life, the hunter repented and entered the Buddhist priesthood. Consequently, the statue came to be known as the "Arrow-Wounded Jizō," and it is said that the scar from that arrow remains visible on the principal deity to this day.

== Temple Grounds ==
(Sanmon (Nio-mon Gate) — Built in February 1909 (Meiji 42). Houses a pair of Nio guardian statues, alongside a pair of crane statues. (Rokkaku Jizo-do (Hexagonal Jizo Hall) — Built in 1862 (Bunkyu 2). Houses six *Osuna Jizo* (sand-based Jizo) statues.

- Chureiden (Hall of Loyal Spirits) — Built in 1948 (Showa 23).
- Goma-do (Fire Ritual Hall) — Built in May 1926 (Taisho 15).
- Daishi-do (Founder's Hall) — Built in 1913 (Taisho 2).

70-Step Stone Staircase

- Main Hall (Hondo) — Built in 1604 (Keicho 9).
- Cedar of the Deity's Descent — The historic site marking the founding of the temple by Kobo Daishi.
- Three-Story Pagoda — Built in 1823 (Bunsei 6). Enshrines the Five Wisdom Buddhas (Hosho, Ashuku, Dainichi, Muryoju, and Fukujoju).
- Chinju-do (Guardian Shrine) — Built in 1653 (Sho-o 2). Enshrines Kakuhō Daigongen.
- Shichifukujin-do (Hall of the Seven Lucky Gods)
- Shoten-do (Hall of Shoten) — Built in 1758 (Horeki 8). Features a statue of En no Gyoja to the left. Located at the highest point on the temple grounds.
- Shoro (Bell Tower) — Built in 1759 (Horeki 9); the bell itself was cast in 1949 (Showa 24) and weighs 135 *kan*. Constructed in the *hakamagoshi* (skirted base) style; located up the path to the right immediately after passing through the Sanmon gate.
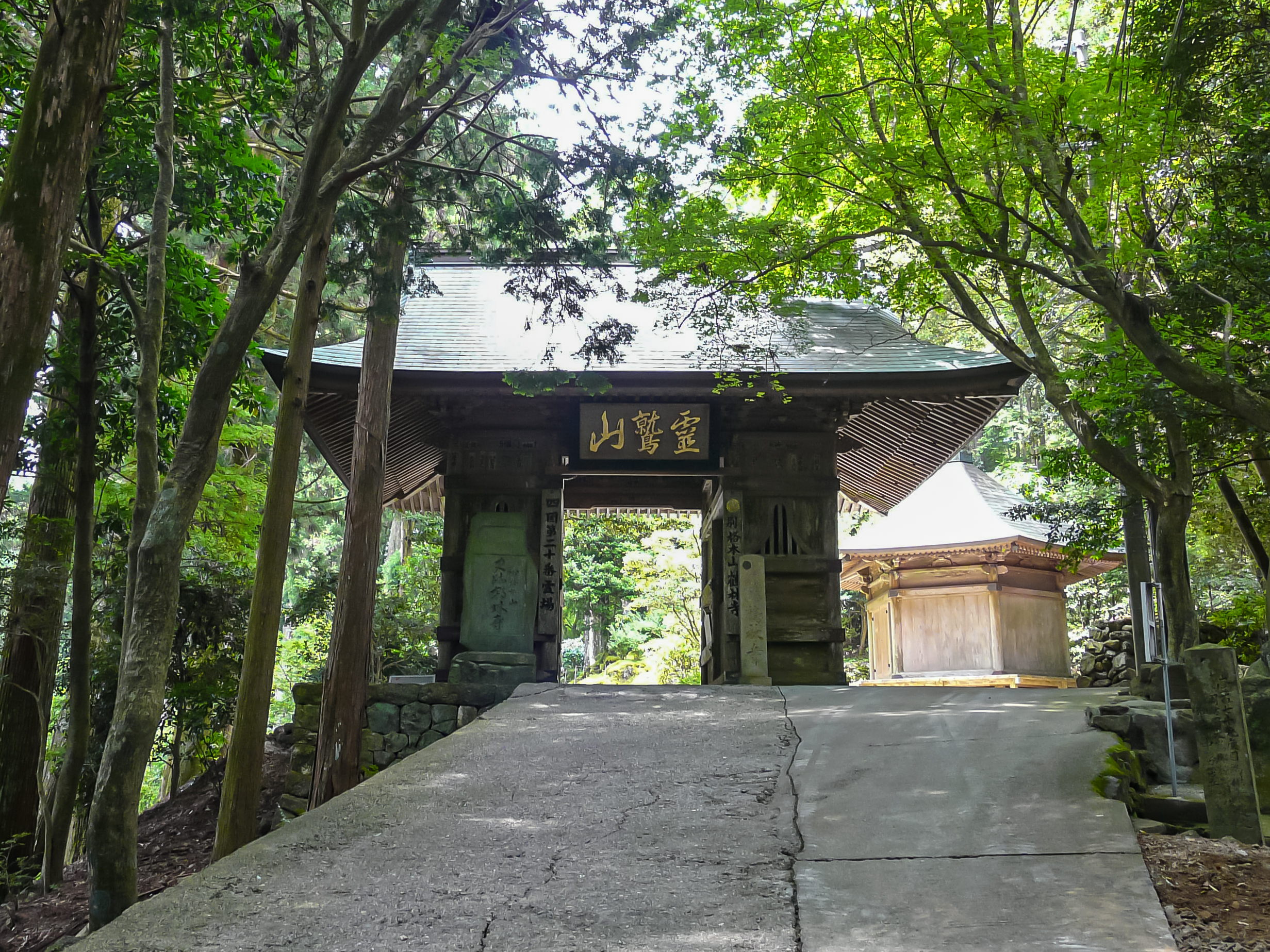
Main Gate and Hexagonal Jizo Hall

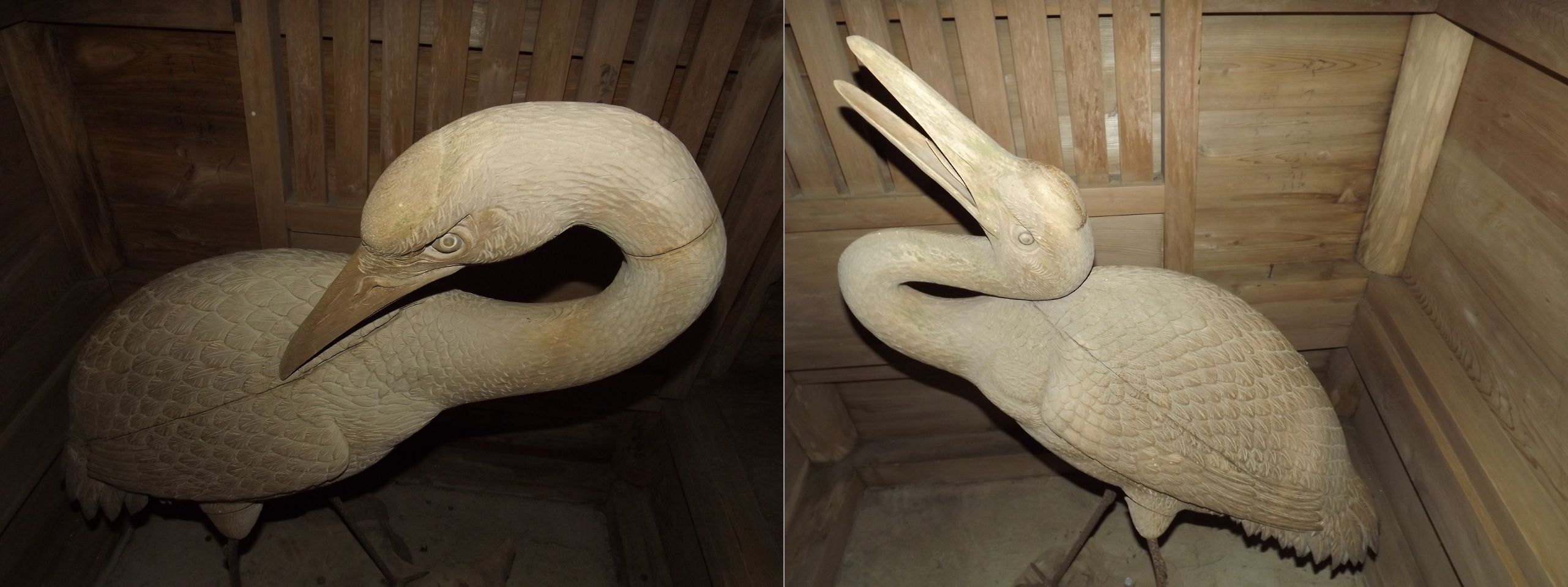
Crane inside the Main Gate

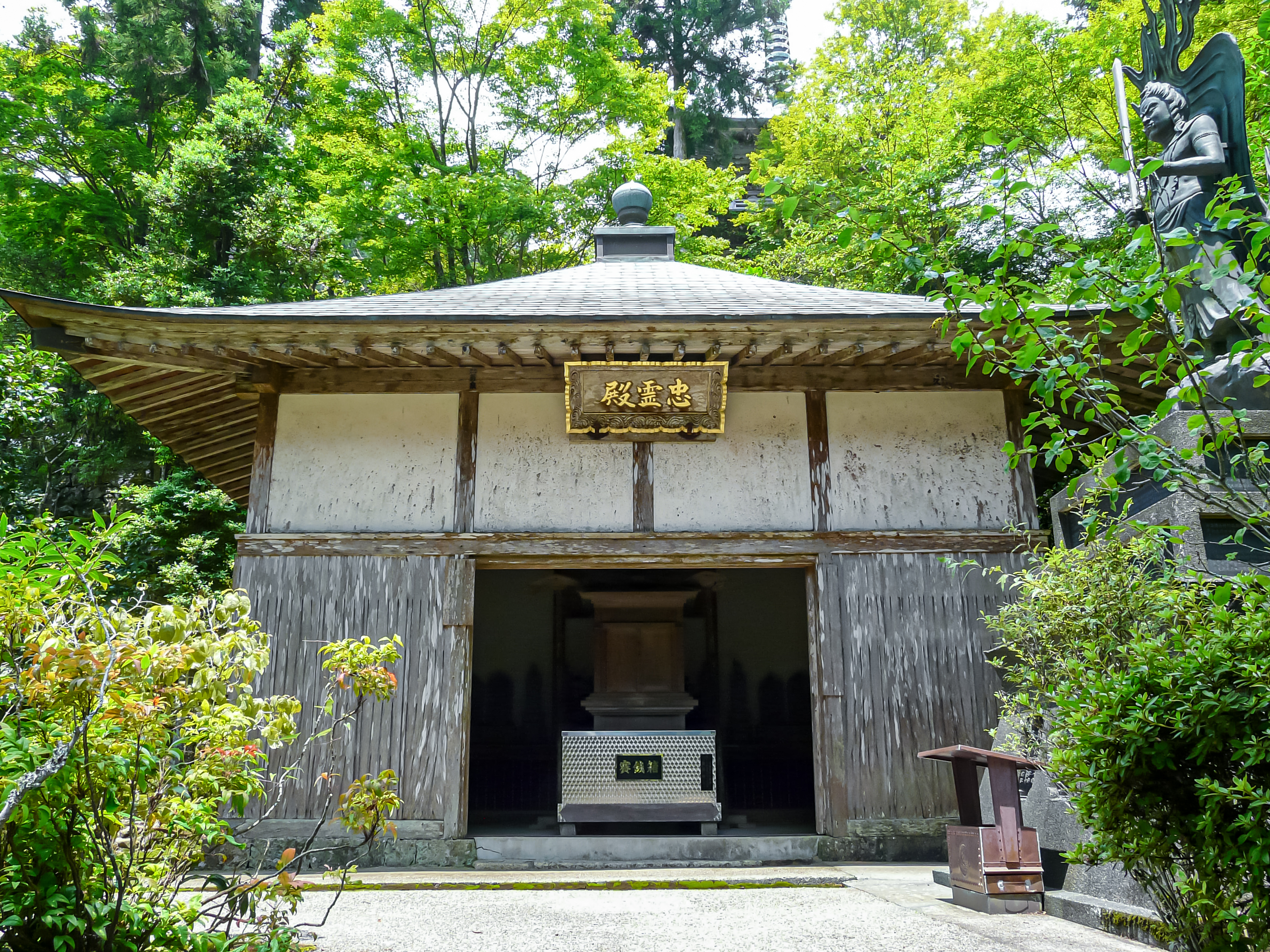
Hall of Loyal Spirits

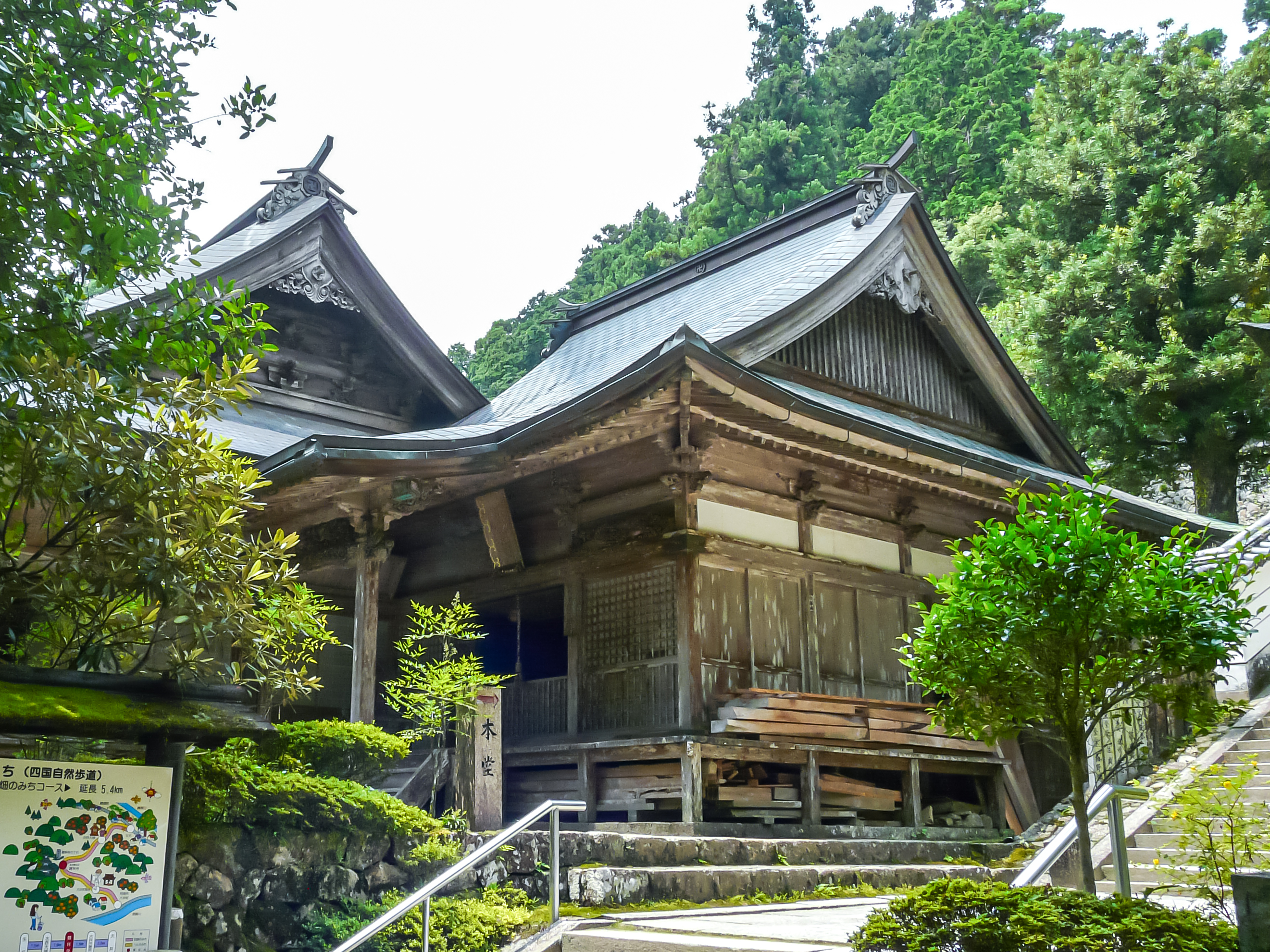
Goma Hall

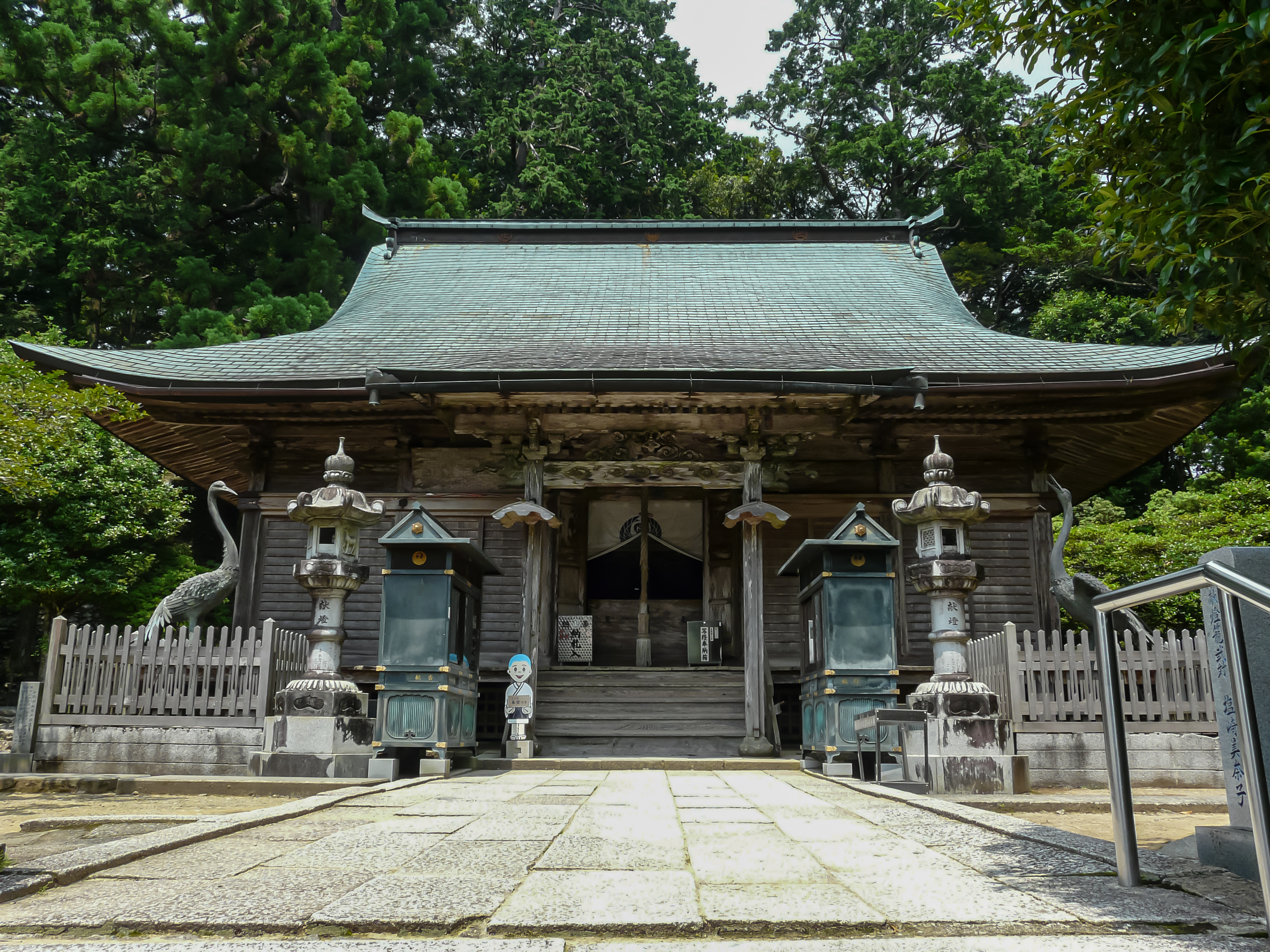
Main Hall

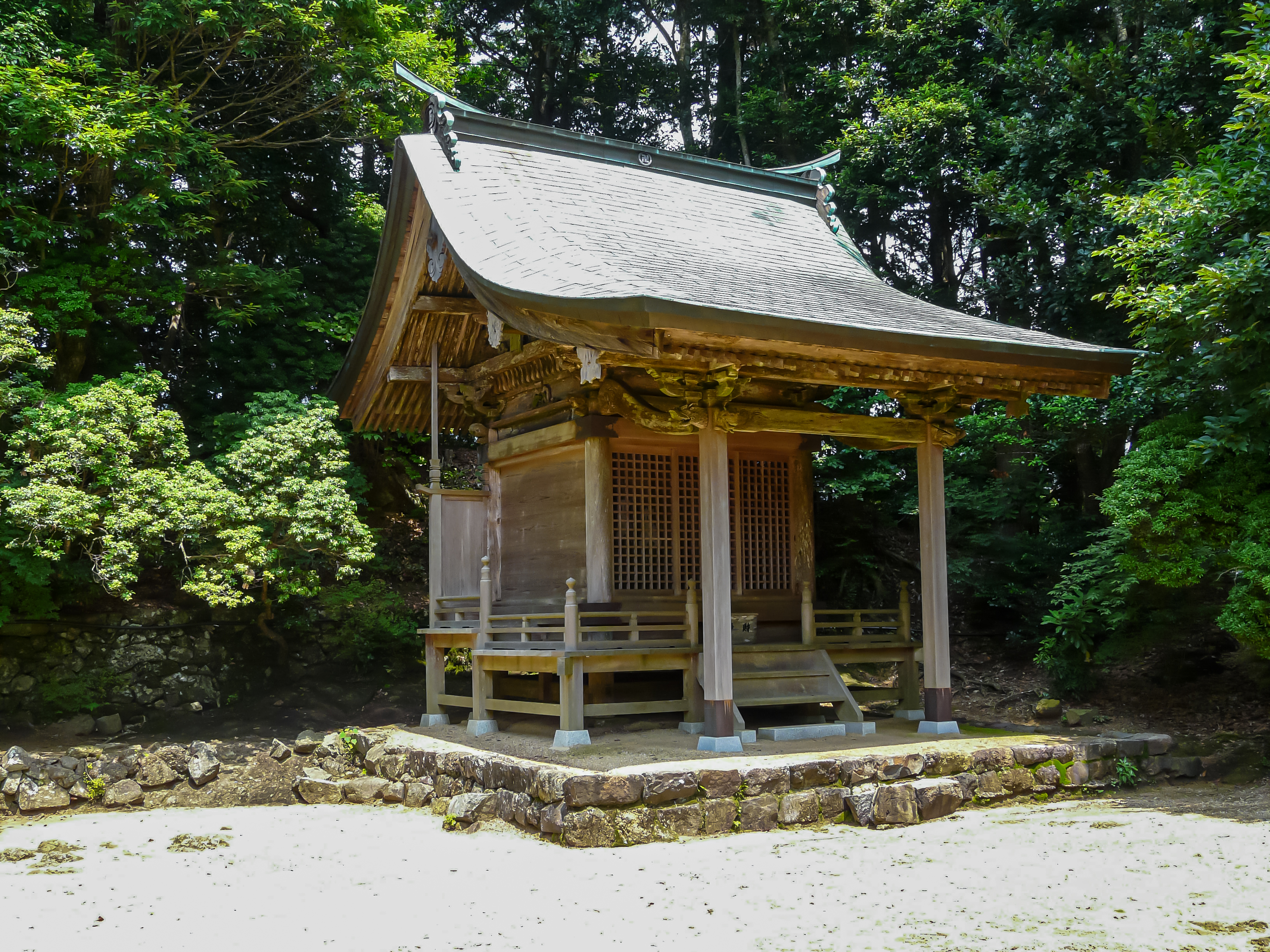
Guardian Shrine

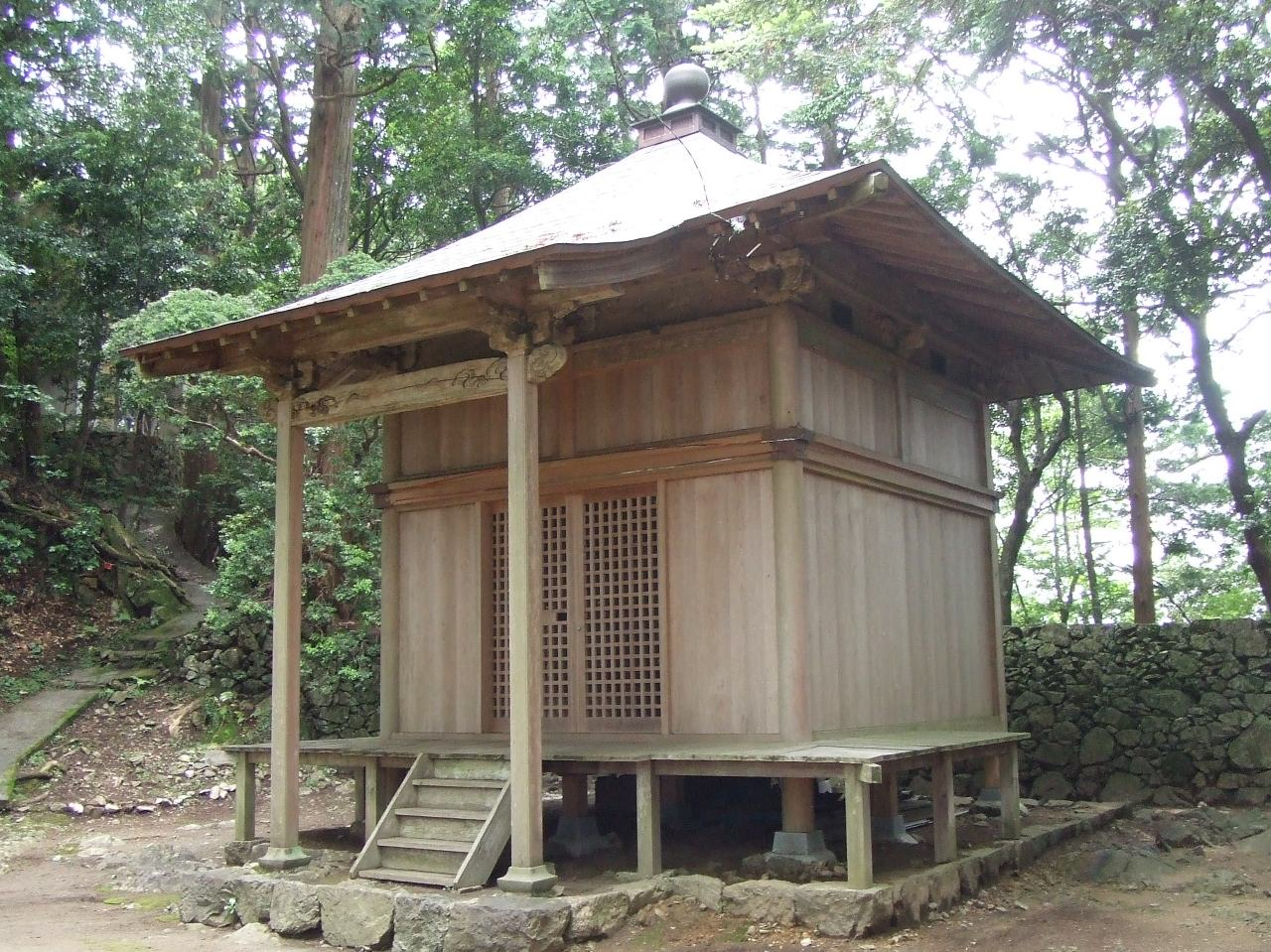
Seiten Hall

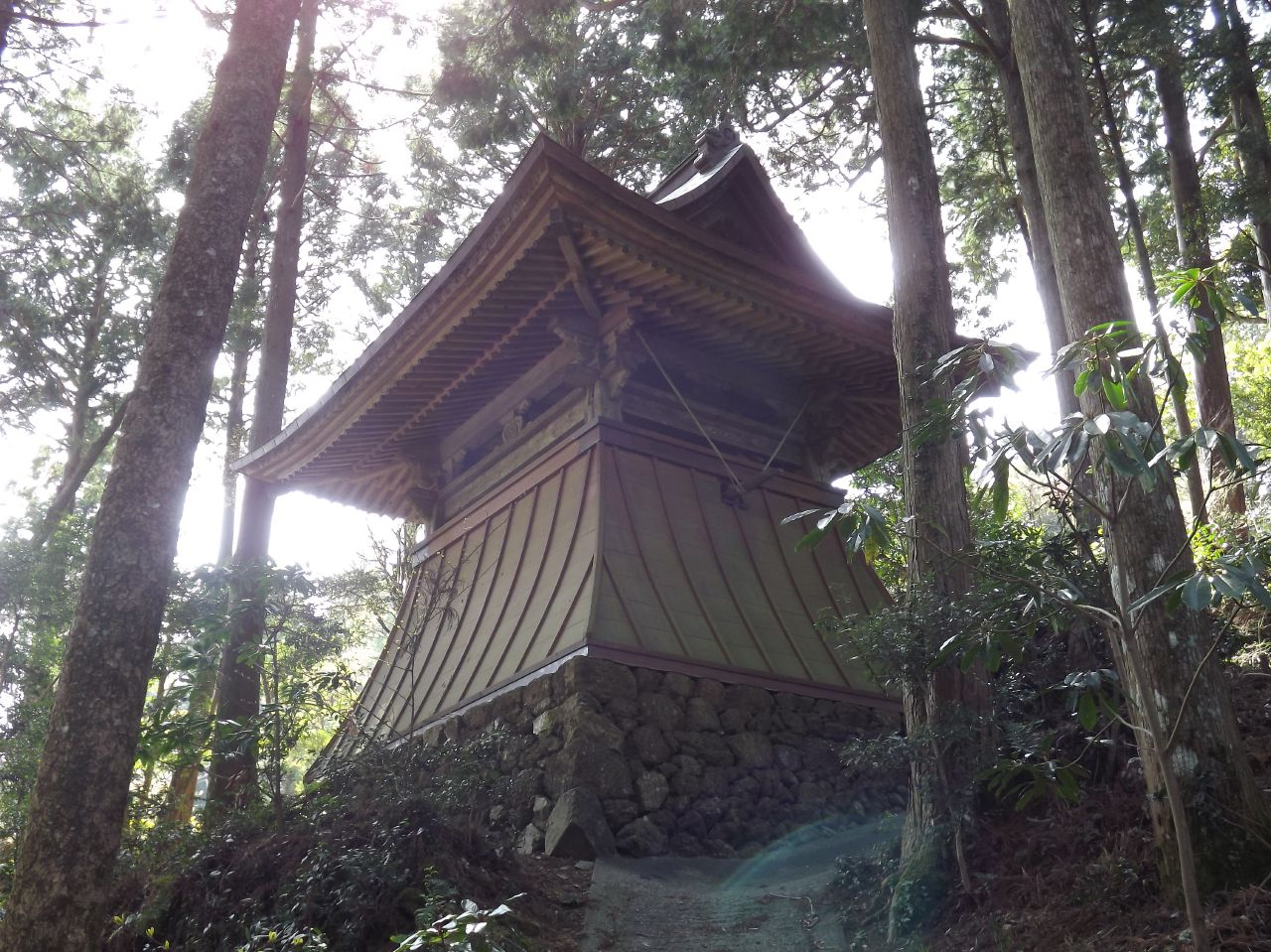
Bell Tower

Entering the temple gate and proceeding along the approach, you will find a hexagonal hall on your right. Further on, there is a water basin on your left and 70 stone steps on your right. To the right at the bottom of the steps is the Chureiden (Memorial Hall), and to the left are the Goma-do (fire ritual hall) and Daishi-do (Great Master Hall). Further ahead is the sutra copying office. Climbing the aforementioned steps leads to the main hall, and behind and to the left of the main hall stands the cedar tree where the principal image of Kobo Daishi is said to have descended, marking the founding site. One level above and to the right of the main hall is a three-story pagoda, with the Chinju-do (guardian shrine) to its upper right. Going up to the left from there, you will find a small hall that originally enshrined the Seven Lucky Gods directly behind the main hall. Going further up and to the upper left of the main hall, you will reach the highest point in the temple grounds, where the Shōten-do (Holy Heaven Hall) is located. The bell tower, with its distinctive skirt-like base, can be found by descending from the right of the three-story pagoda towards the temple gate, but it is closed and usually inaccessible. The pilgrimage route to Tairyuji Temple descends from beside the water basin.

Daihonbo (Main Hall) - Established in 1895 (Meiji 28).

Training Hall - Built in 1970, 120 tatami mats.

Treasure House - Built in April 1748.

Reihoden (Sacred Treasure Hall) - Built in 1961.

Kuri (Monk's Quarters) - Built in 1895, 85 tsubo.

Haiku Monument - A haiku by Taki Yoshitsune, "In the mist (Note: The ornament attached to the finial of the three-story pagoda), the mystical crane blooms (Note: Magnolia kobus)," is located to the right of the Niomon Gate.

Temple Lodging: None Parking: Approximately 30 regular cars, free of charge.

== Cultural Property ==
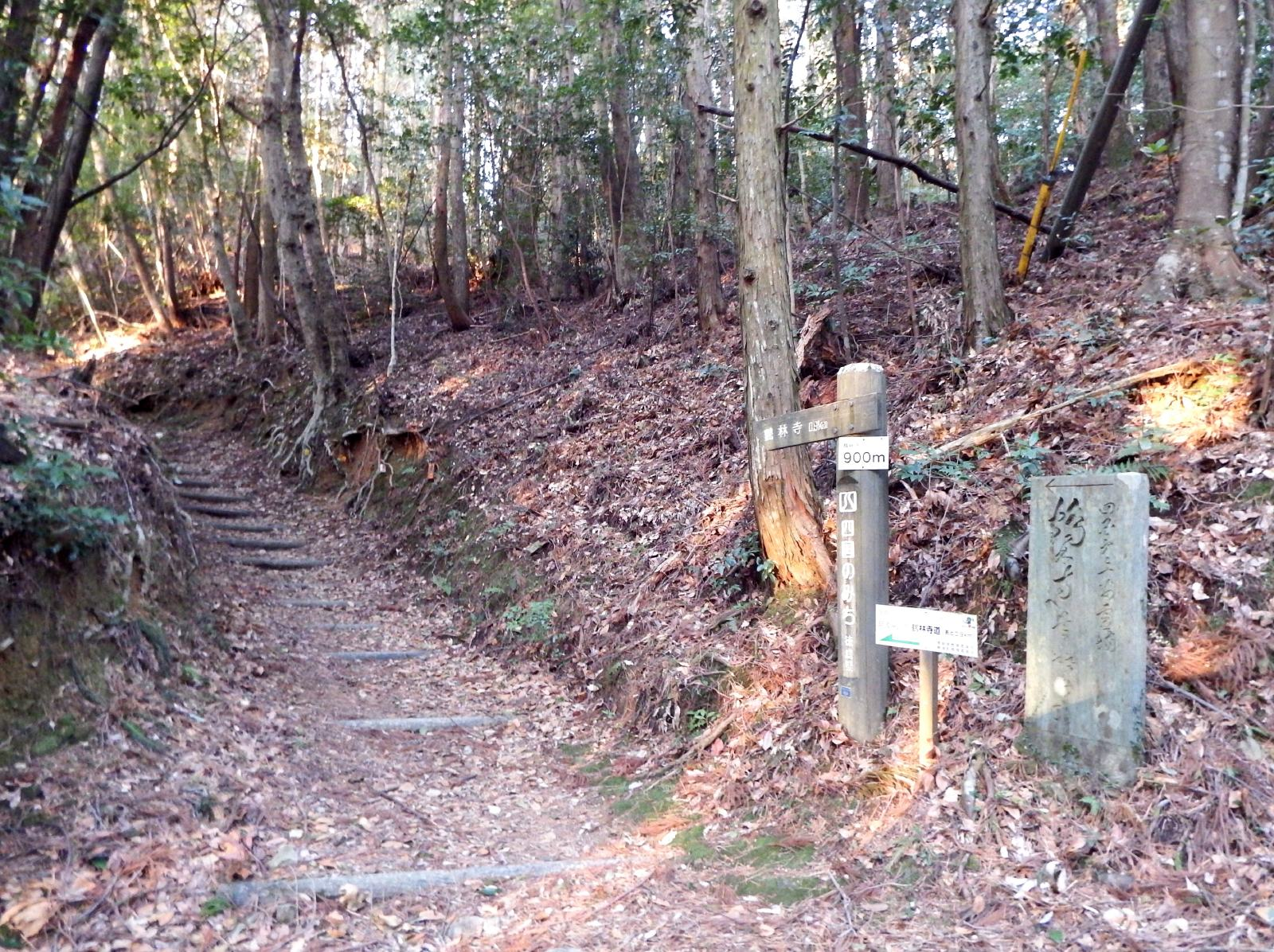
Awa Pilgrimage Route: Kakurin-ji Path

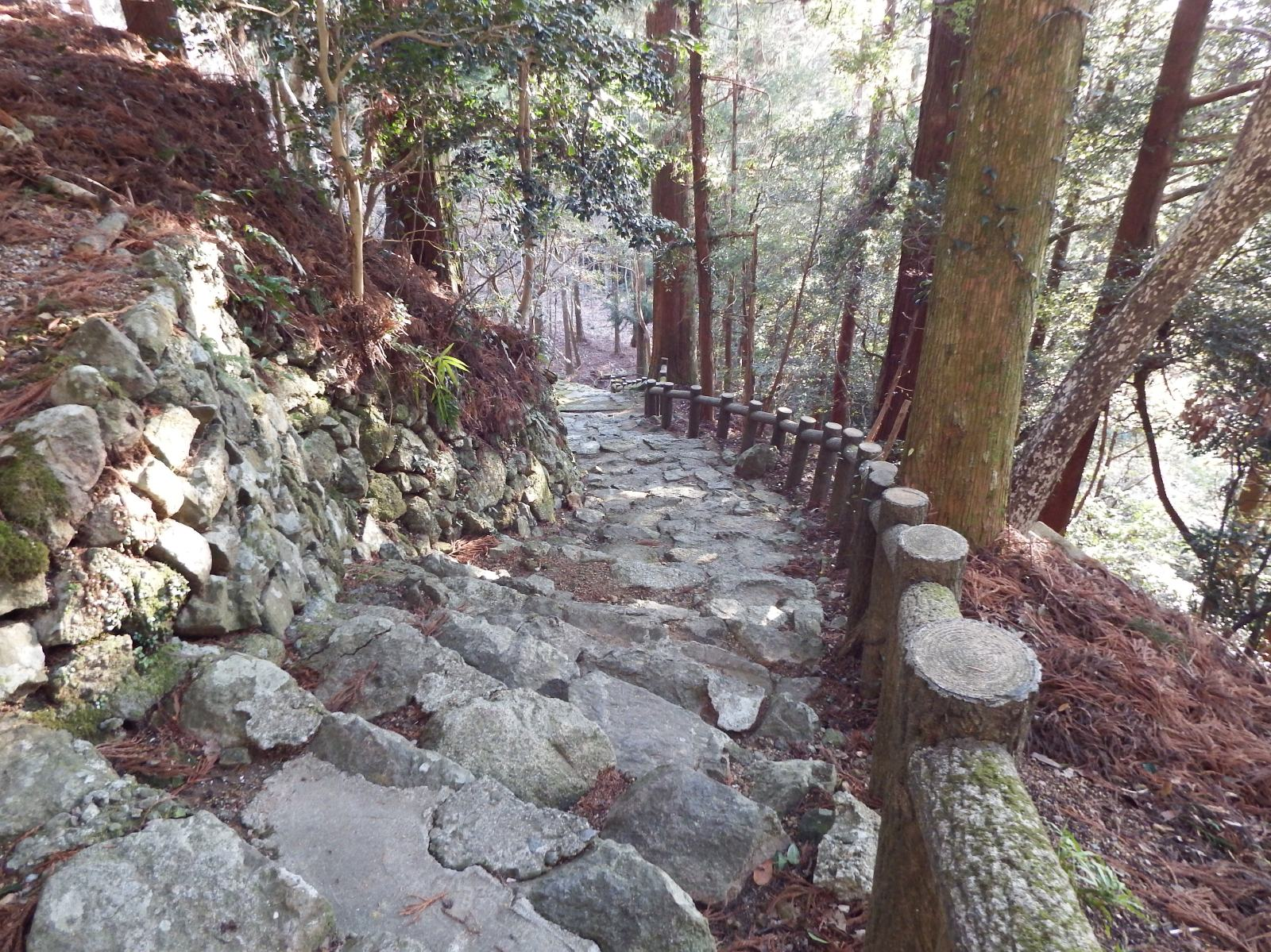
Awa Pilgrimage Route: Tairyū-ji Path

=== Important Cultural Property ===
- Wooden Standing Statue of Jizō Bodhisattva — Joined-wood construction, polychrome, height: 63.3 cm, Late Heian Period; deposited at the Kyoto National Museum; designated on August 9, 1911.

=== National Historic Site ===
- Awa Pilgrimage Route: Kakurinji Path — The approximately 1.27 km section between Mizunomi-Daishi and Kakurinji; designated on August 5, 2010.
- Awa Pilgrimage Route: Tairyūji Path (First Half) — Approximately 1.3 km, from Kakurinji Temple to just before the Ōi settlement.
- Awa Pilgrimage Route: Tsurin-ji Temple Precinct (4.6 ha) — Designated on February 9, 2017.

=== Tokushima Prefectural Designated Tangible Cultural Property ===
- Colored Painting on Silk: Jizō Welcoming the Deceased — Designated June 7, 1968.
- Three-Story Pagoda — Constructed in Bunsei 10 (1827); copper-plate roofing; height: 23 meters; designated on June 25, Showa 27 (1952).

=== Katsuura Town Designated Tangible Cultural Properties ===
(Main Hall — Designated July 10, 1978.

- Senbutsumyō-kyō* (Sutra of the Names of the Thousand Buddhas), 3 Scrolls — Designated July 10, 1978.

=== Important Art Objects (Nationally Certified) ===
Painted Silk Hanging Scroll: The Shakyamuni Triad — Deposited at the Kyoto National Museum. Certified June 7, 1940.

== Access ==
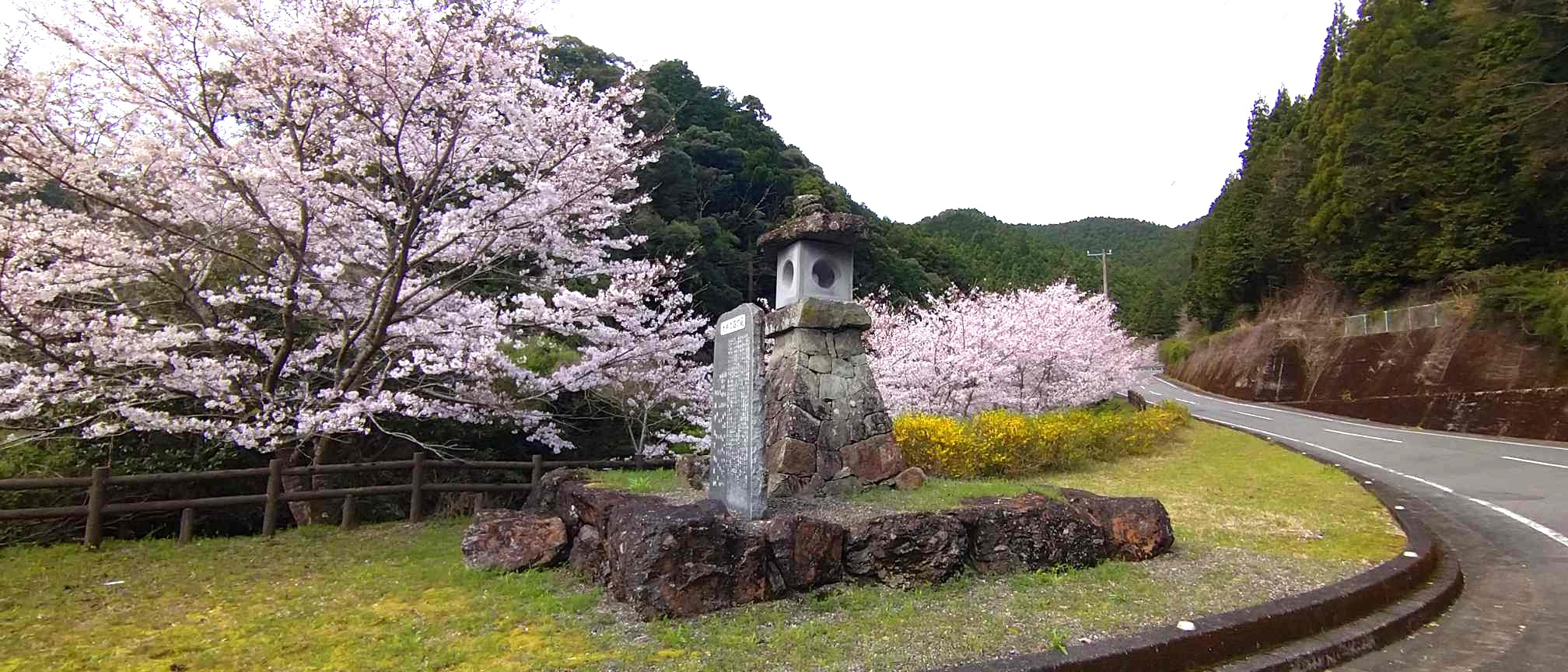
Stone Lantern at Ooi

=== Pilgrimage Route ===
- Temple 19, Tatsue-ji --(4.0 km)-- Kayahara, Kushibuchi-cho --(6.2 km)-- Ikuna, Katsuura-cho --(1.3 km)-- Mizunomi Daishi --(1.6 km)-- Temple 20

=== Railway ===
- Shikoku Railway Company (JR Shikoku) Mugi Line – Alight at Tatsue Station (13.5 km)

=== Bus ===
- Tokushima Bus, Katsuura Line (bound for Yokose) – Alight at "Ikuna" (3.4 km)

=== Road ===
- General Roads: Tokushima Prefectural Road 19 (Anan-Washiki-Hiwasa Line) -- Ooi Stone Lantern -- Prefectural Road 283 (Washiki-Katsuura Line) -- From Tsuru Pass (1.9 km; via Tokushima Prefectural Road 146, Kakurin-ji Line)

== Inner Sanctuary ==
=== Jigen-ji ===
Gecchō-zan Hōju-in Jigen-ji — "Ana-zenjō" (No. 3 of the Shikoku 20 Supplementary Sacred Sites) Location: Masaki, Kamikatsu-chō, Katsuura-chō, Katsuura-gun, Tokushima Prefecture (33°56′24.73″N 134°25′50.68″E)

== Nearby Unofficial Sacred Sites ==
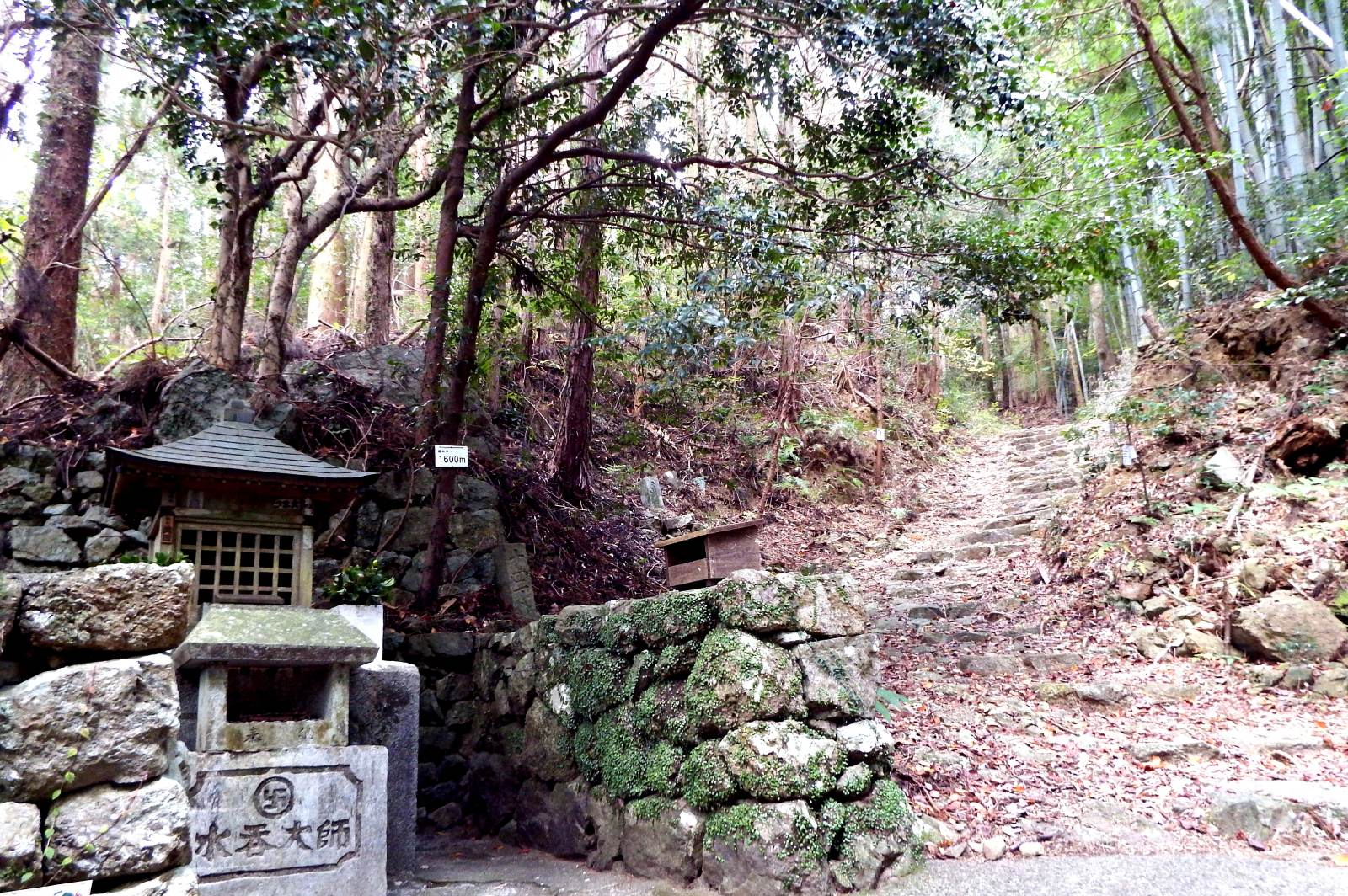
Mizunomi Daishi

=== Mizunomi Daishi ===
Located 1.27 km prior to this temple, this site is the subject of a legend recounting that when Kobo Daishi struck the ground with his staff, water gushed forth. The path is paved with concrete up to this point; from here onward, the route constitutes the section of the Awa Pilgrimage Trail (Tsurinji Route) that has been designated as a historic site.
- Location: Ikuna, Katsuura-cho, Katsuura-gun, Tokushima Prefecture (33°55′14″N 134°30′54.97″E)

== Nearby Facilities for Pilgrims ==
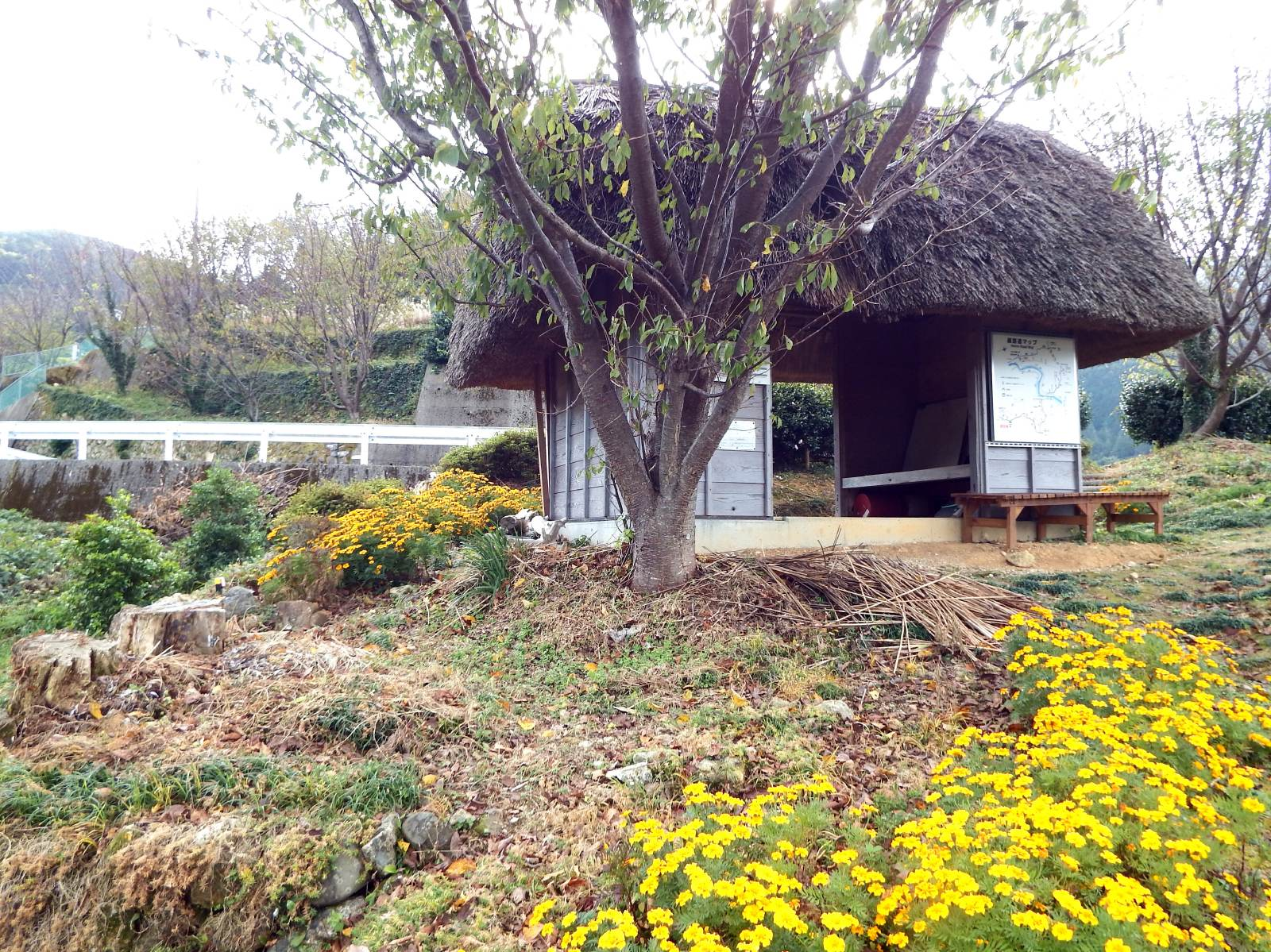
Thatched-roof resting hut

=== Thatched-Roof Pilgrim Hut ===
A thatched-roof hut situated approximately 0.5 km (0.31 mi) north—down the pilgrim path—from Mizunomi Daishi.
Constructed in fiscal year 2010 with a grant from the Agency for Cultural Affairs, this hut was built by the Tokushima Cultural Property Meister Liaison Council and the Kamiyama Thatching Research Group with the aim of passing down Tokushima's vanishing traditional thatching techniques to future generations. It was officially completed on March 12, 2011. The structure currently serves as a rest stop for pilgrims walking the path to Kakurin-ji Temple.
- Location: Ikuna, Katsuura-cho, Katsuura-gun, Tokushima Prefecture (33°55′31.10″N 134°30′54.72″E)

== Neighboring Temples ==
=== Shikoku 88 temple pilgrimage ===
19 Tatsue-ji --(13.1 km)-- 20 Kakurin-ji --(6.7 km)-- 21 Tairyū-ji
*Note: There are multiple routes for the pilgrimage path; the distances listed above are based on the standard route.

== See also ==
- Shikoku 88 temple pilgrimage

== Bibliography ==
- 四国八十八箇所霊場会 編 『先達教典』 2006年
- 宮崎建樹 著 『四国遍路ひとり歩き同行二人』地図編 へんろみち保存協力会 2007年（第8版）
