= Yamato-Aogaki Quasi-National Park =

Quasi-National Park in Nara, Japan

Coordinates: 34°36′N 136°00′E

- 大和青垣国定公園
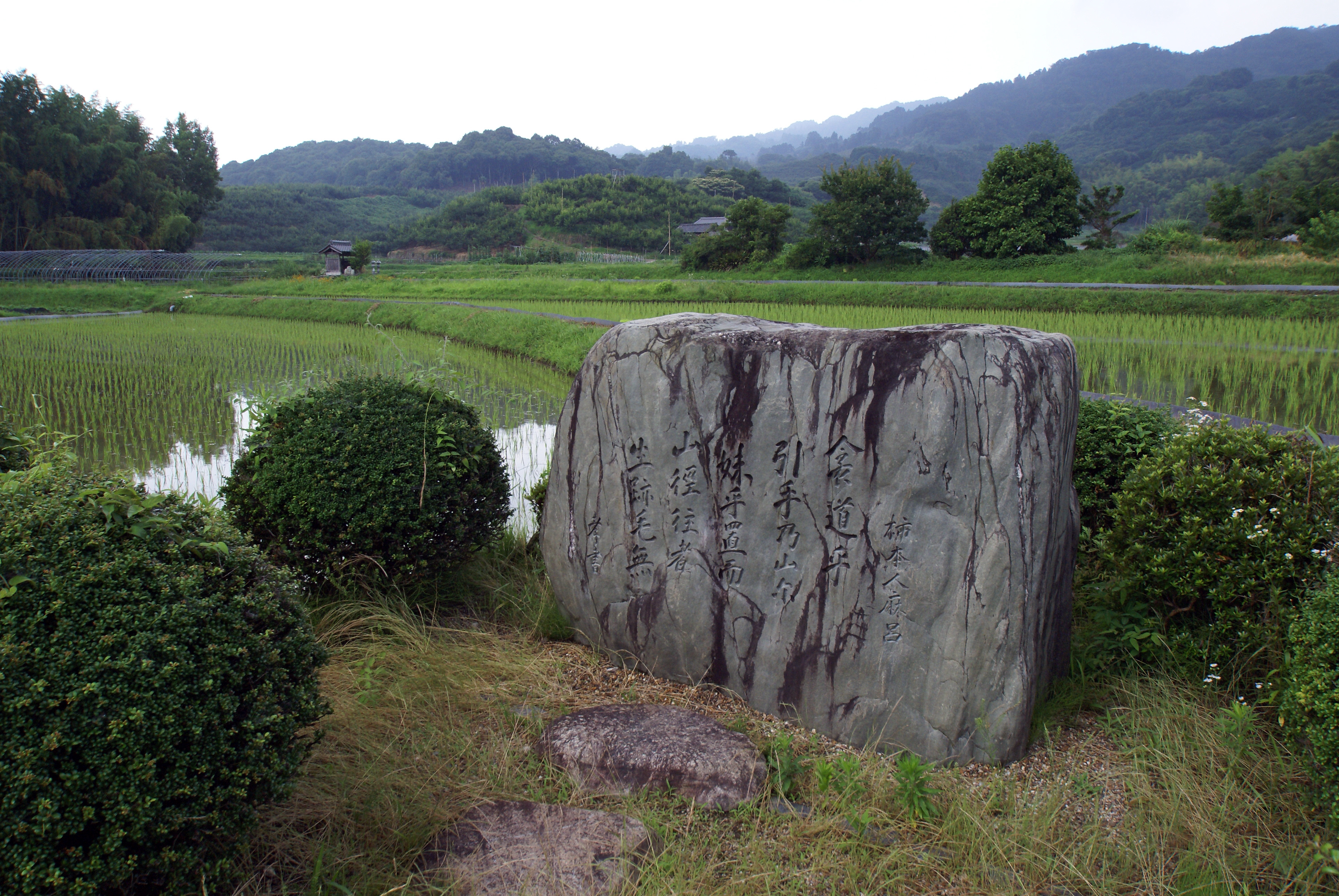
- Yamanobe-no-michi
- Interactive map of Yamato-Aogaki Quasi-National Park
- Location: Nara Prefecture, Japan
- Area: 57.42 km^{2} (22.17 sq mi)
- Established: 28 December 1970

Yamato-Aogaki Quasi-National Park (大和青垣国定公園, Yamato-Aogaki Kokutei Kōen) is a Quasi-National Park in northeast Nara Prefecture, Japan. Established in 1970, the park consists of one continuous area spanning the borders of the municipalities of Nara, Tenri, and Sakurai. The park encompasses Mount Miwa, Byakugō-ji (白毫寺), Shōryaku-ji (正暦寺), Enshō-ji, Kōnin-ji (弘仁寺), Isonokami Jingū, Chōgaku-ji, Ōmiwa Jinja, and Hase-dera, as well as a number of kofun.

== See also ==
- List of national parks of Japan
