= Kōgen-ji =

Buddhist temple in Asuka, Nara Prefecture, Japan

Kōgen-ji 向原寺
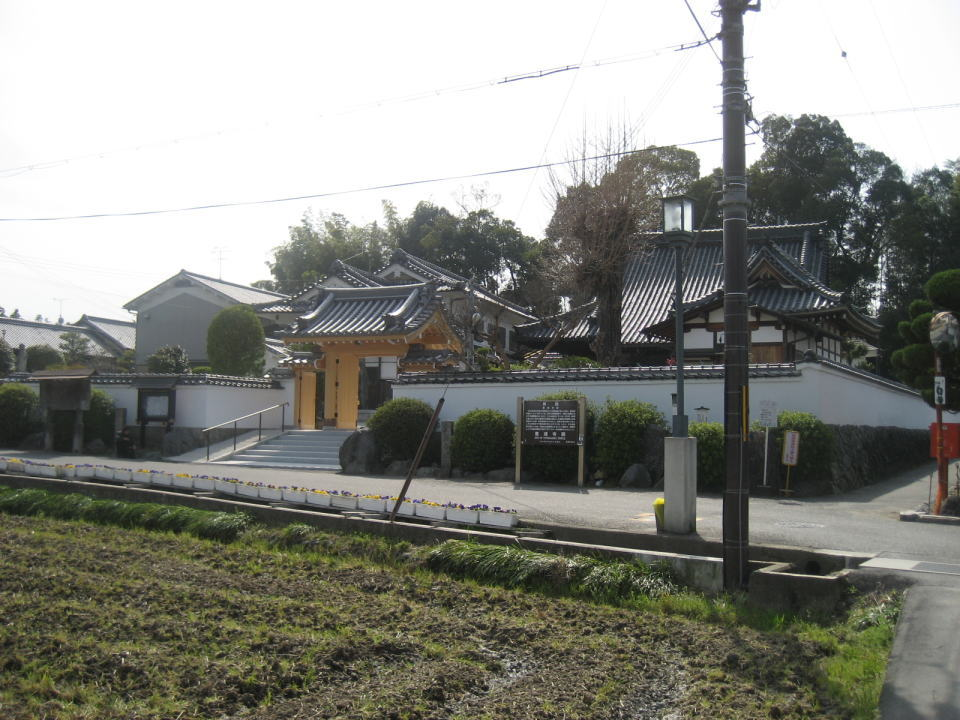

- Location within Japan

Religion
- Affiliation: Jōdo Shinshū Honganji-ha

Location
- Location: 630 Toyoura, Asuka-mura, Takaichi-gun, Nara Prefecture
- Country: Japan
- Interactive map of Kōgen-ji 向原寺
- Coordinates: 34°28′56″N 135°48′45″E

Architecture
- Founder: Soga no Iname

Kōgen-ji (向原寺, also written 広厳寺) is a Buddhist temple in Asuka, Nara Prefecture, Japan. The original temple was established by Soga no Iname. It is affiliated with Jōdo Shinshū Buddhism. It is one of the twenty-five Kansai flower temples.

== See also ==
- Historical Sites of Prince Shōtoku
