= Gansen-ji =

Buddhist temple in Kizugawa, Kyoto, Japan

- 岩船寺
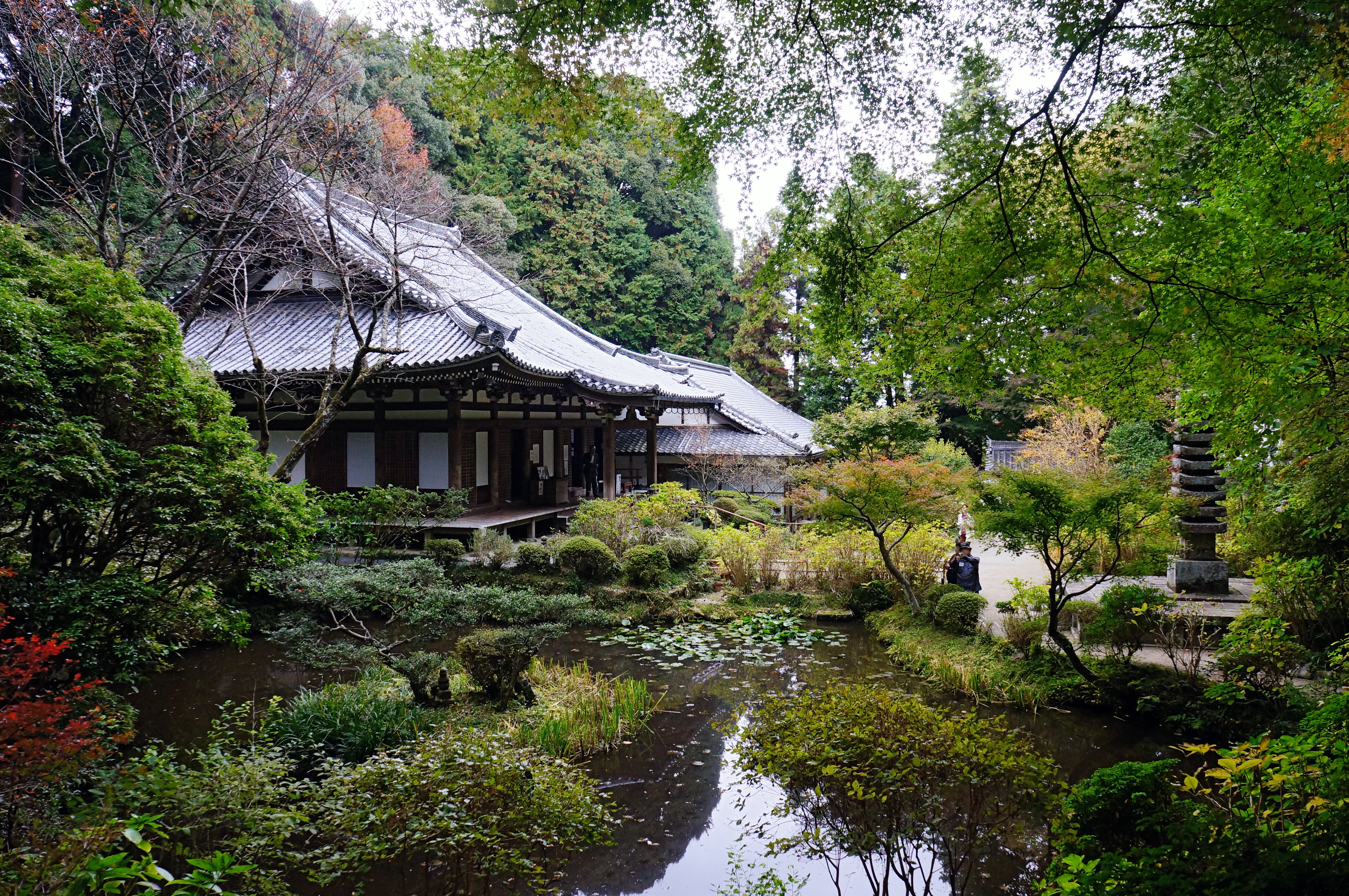
- The main hall and pond

- Location within Kyoto Prefecture Location within Japan

Religion
- Affiliation: Buddhist
- Sect: Shingon Risshu
- Prefecture: Kyoto

Location
- Municipality: Kizugawa
- Country: Japan
- Interactive map of Gansen-ji
- Prefecture: Kyoto
- Coordinates: 34°43′12.9″N 135°53′8.9″E

Website
- gansenji.or.jp (Japanese)

Gansen-ji (Japanese: 岩船寺) is a Japanese Buddhist temple of the Shingon Risshu sect in the city of Kizugawa in Kyoto Prefecture, Japan.

The temple is known for its hydrangea gardens, and is the fifteenth of the twenty-five Kansai flower temples, a multi-sect association of twenty-five Japanese Buddhist temples in the Kansai region that are known for their flower and foliage displays.

The temple is part of the Tono Magaibubu Cultural Property Environmental Conservation Area and is part of two Japanese Buddhist pilgrimages. The temple is fourth of the eighteen ancient Shingon temples and is the 129th of the Kansai region's 152 shrines of the Shinbutsu Pilgrimage.

== History ==
According to the Gansen-ji Engi (Japanese: 岩船寺縁起, lit. 'Gansen-ji's Origin') compiled in 1632, Gansen-ji was built in 729 by the Buddhist priest Gyōki by order of Emperor Shōmu. Much of it was burned down during the Jōkyū War in 1221 before being rebuilt in 1311. After being destroyed again by fire, donations were made for its reconstruction by Tokugawa Ieyasu and Tokugawa Hidetada, and was rebuilt between 1624 and 1643 during the Kan'ei era.

To celebrate the 2600th anniversary of Japan's founding, a gagaku musical group called the Garyōkai held a concert at Gansen-ji on December 7, 1940. The event included classical music, noh dances, and a special Japanese tea ceremony.

== Artifacts ==
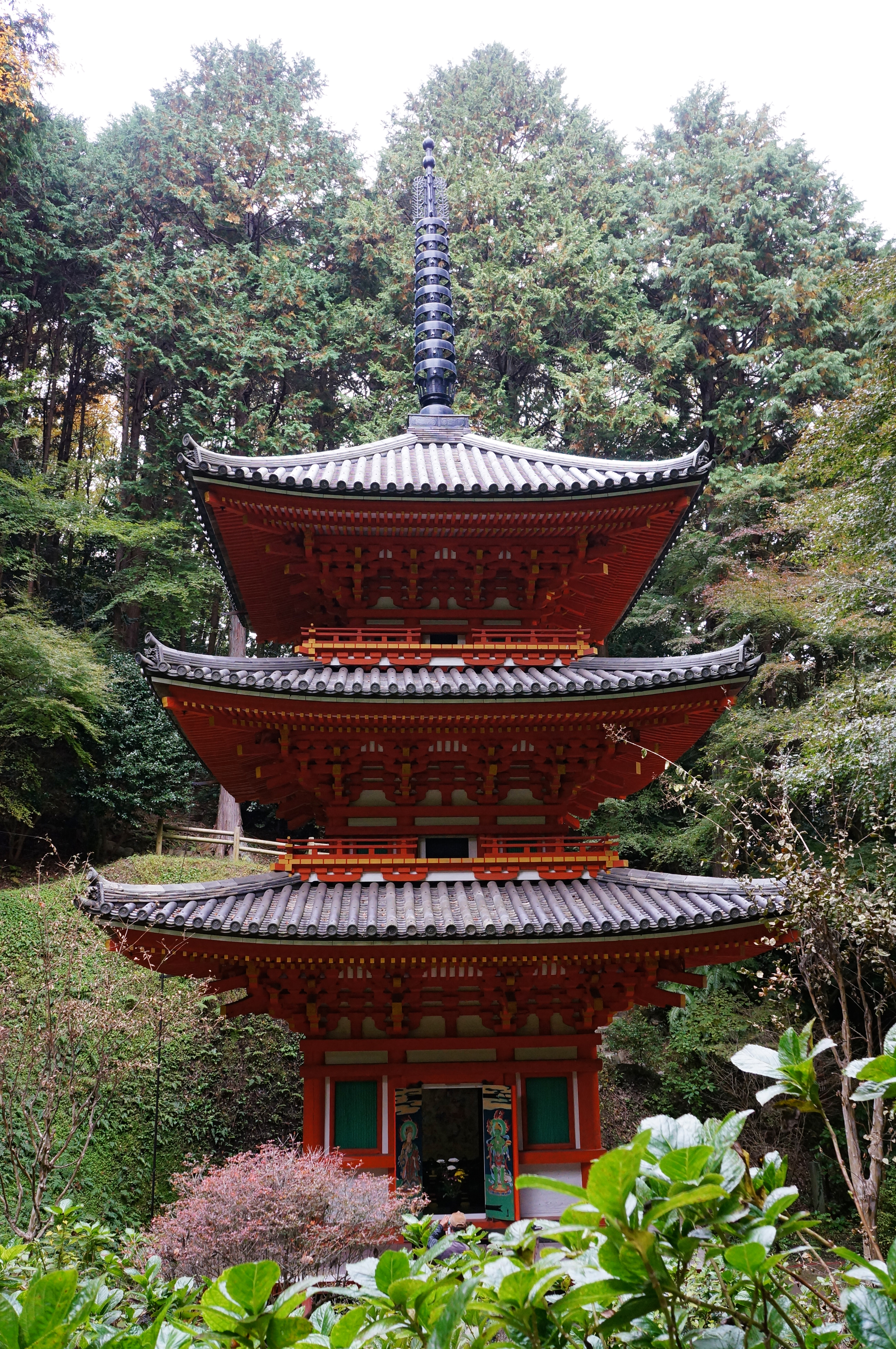
The three-storied wooden pagoda

Gansen-ji has a wooden Japanese pagoda, two stone pagodas, and a stone chamber that have each been recognized as Nationally Designated Important Cultural Property.

The temple's three-storied wooden pagoda was built in 1442 during the Muromachi period and was designated as a Nationally Designated Important Cultural Property in 1889.

The thirteen-story stone pagoda and the gorintō were both built from between 1275 and 1332 during the late Kamakura period and were each designated Nationally Designated Important Cultural Property in 1952. Near the thirteen-story pagoda is a small stone chamber housing a stone haut-relief statue of Fudō Myōō, which was built in 1312 in the late Kamakura period and was also designated a Nationally Designated Important Cultural Property in 1952.

Among the cultural artifacts within the temple is a 275-centimetre-tall (9.02 ft) wooden seated statue of Amida Nyorai that was created in 946 during the Heian period.
