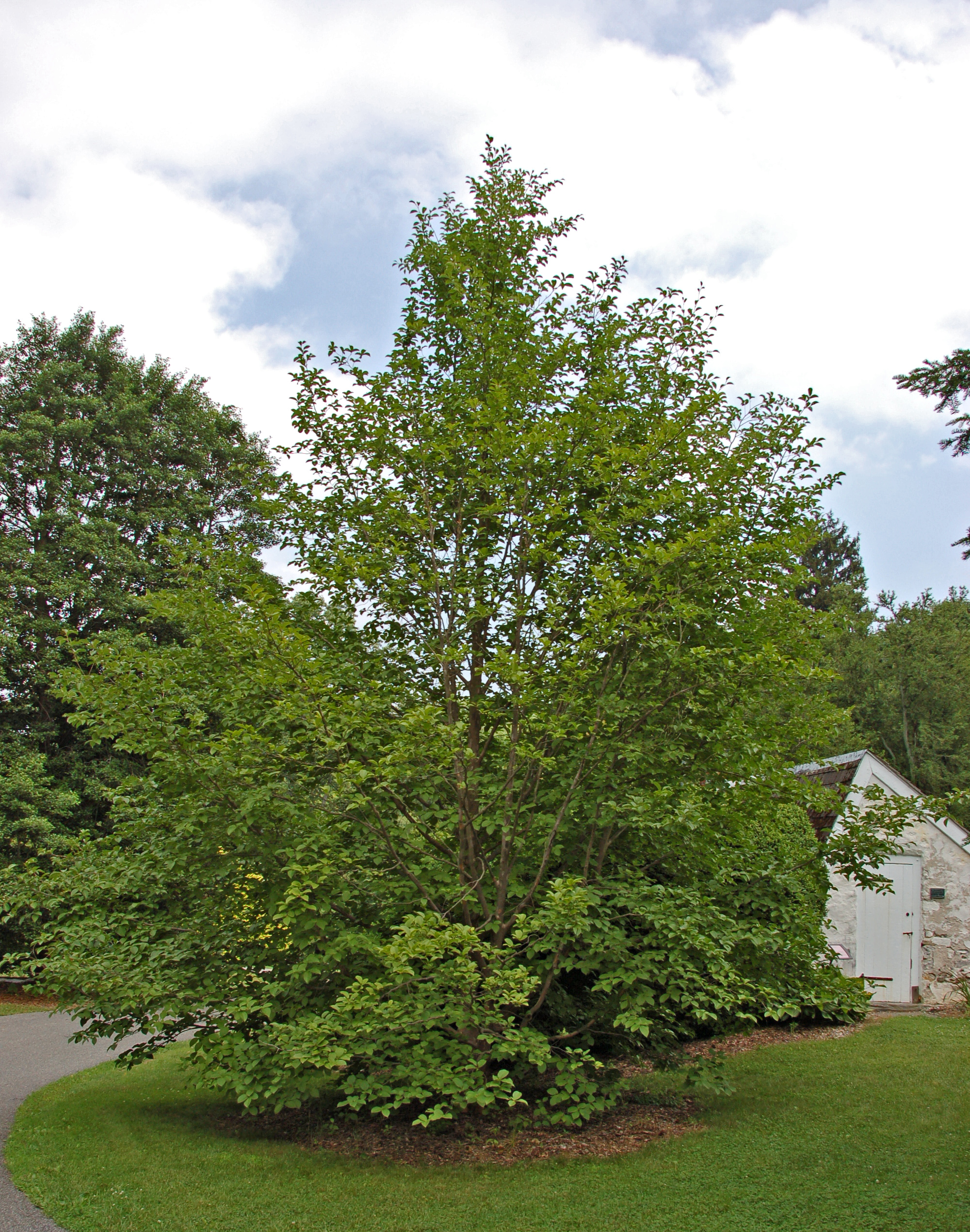

Scientific classification
- Kingdom: Plantae
- Clade: Tracheophytes
- Clade: Angiosperms
- Clade: Eudicots
- Clade: Asterids
- Order: Ericales
- Family: Theaceae
- Genus: Stewartia
- Species: S. pseudocamellia

Binomial name
- Stewartia pseudocamellia Maxim.

Synonyms
- Stewartia grandiflora Carrière; Stewartia koreana Nakai ex Rehder

= Stewartia pseudocamellia =

Species of flowering plant

Stewartia pseudocamellia, also known as Korean stewartia, Japanese stewartia, or deciduous camellia, is a species of flowering plant in the family Theaceae, native to Japan (southern Honshū, Kyūshū, Shikoku) and Korea.

== Names ==
It is called natsutsubaki(ナツツバキ, "summer camellia") in Japanese, and nogaknamu(노각나무, "overripe cucumber tree") in Korean.

The Latin specific epithet pseudocamellia references the flower's resemblance to the related camellia.

== Description ==
It is a small to medium-sized deciduous tree, growing to 10–15 m (rarely to 18 m) tall often with multiple stems and/or low branching trunks. The bark is smooth textured, exfoliating as the plants age, and has a camouflaged or mottled appearance with patterns of dull orange and green with grey mixed in. The trees are pyramidal to rounded in shape with deep green coloured foliage. Young stems have a zig-zag shape with flattened, divergent buds. The leaves are 4–12 cm long and 2.5–5 cm broad, arranged alternately on the stems with an elliptical shape and finely serrated edges. In the fall the foliage turns yellow, red or purple. The flowers are up to 8 cm wide, with five white petals with orange anthers; they are shaped like those of the related Camellia, round and flat to somewhat cupped. They are produced in summer, generally in June until the end of August; each flower is short-lived, but many are produced that open over many weeks. The fruit is a brown capsule, triangular in shape with four or five angles, persistent on the trees but not showy.

== Varieties ==
There are two varieties:

- Stewartia pseudocamellia var. japonica Maxim. Japan. Flowers open cup-shaped.
- Stewartia pseudocamellia var. koreana (Nakai ex Rehd.) Sealy. Korea. Flowers open flat. Often treated as a separate species S. koreana Nakai ex Rehd., mainly in Korea.

== Cultivation ==
Stewartia pseudocamellia is an attractive ornamental tree that grows best in rich organic soils with good drainage and consistent moisture throughout the year. It is grown in full sun, but under hot and dry conditions it grows best in some light shade during the afternoon. It is used as a specimen planting in shrub borders or as a specimen in lawn plantings, having year round interest. It can be temperamental to establish and younger trees transplant best. When grown with single trunks they form taller more pyramidal shaped trees, when having multiple trunks plants tend to grow shorter and spread out wider. In the wild in Japan plants have been known to grow 18 m (59 ft) tall, and in cultivation have already reached up to 15 m (49 ft) tall.

S. pseudocamellia was introduced into western cultivation in 1874, and has survived winters as cold as −30 °C (−22 °F).

In the UK this plant, and the Koreana Group, have received the Royal Horticultural Society's Award of Garden Merit.

== Gallery ==
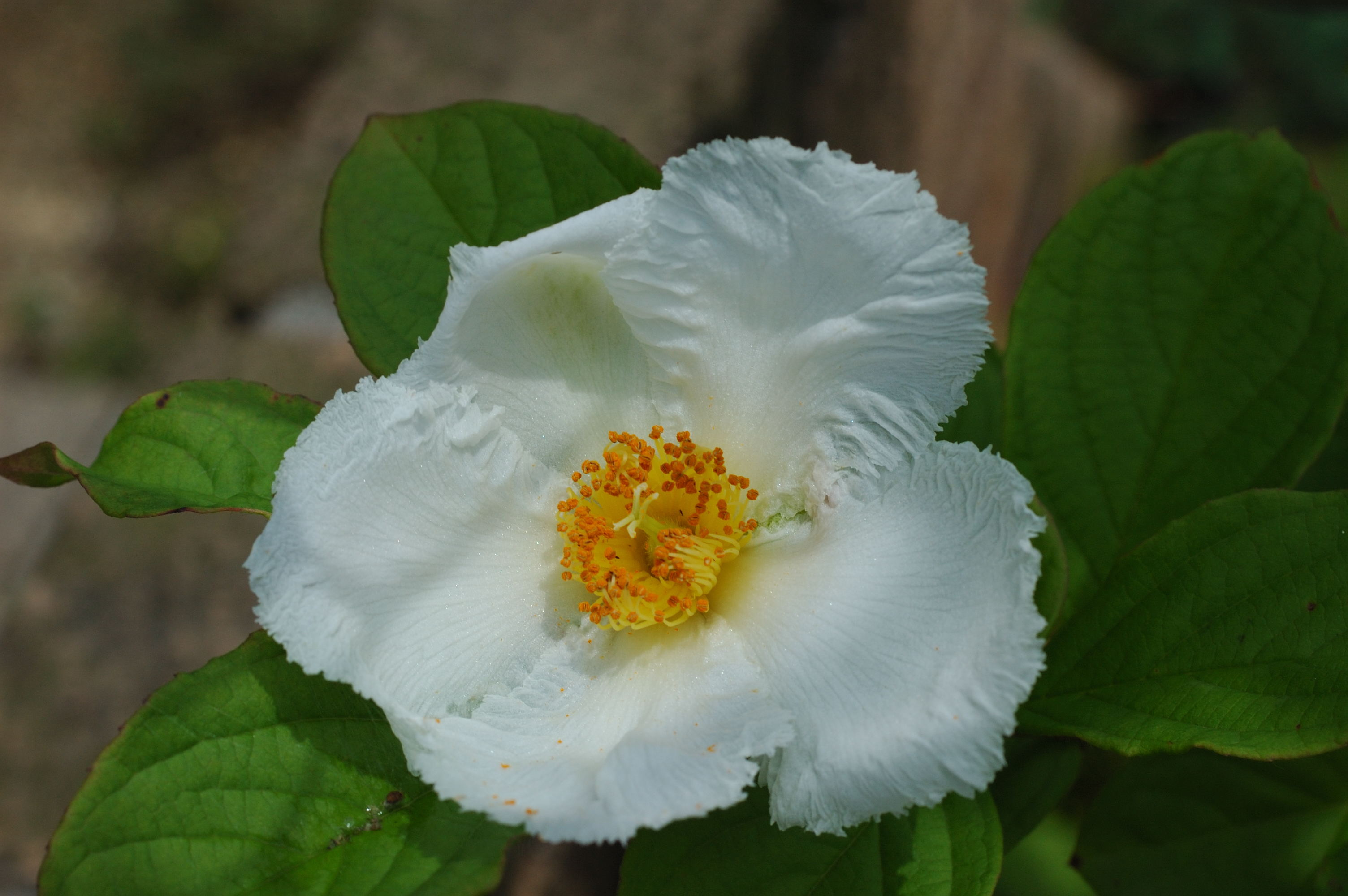
Flower

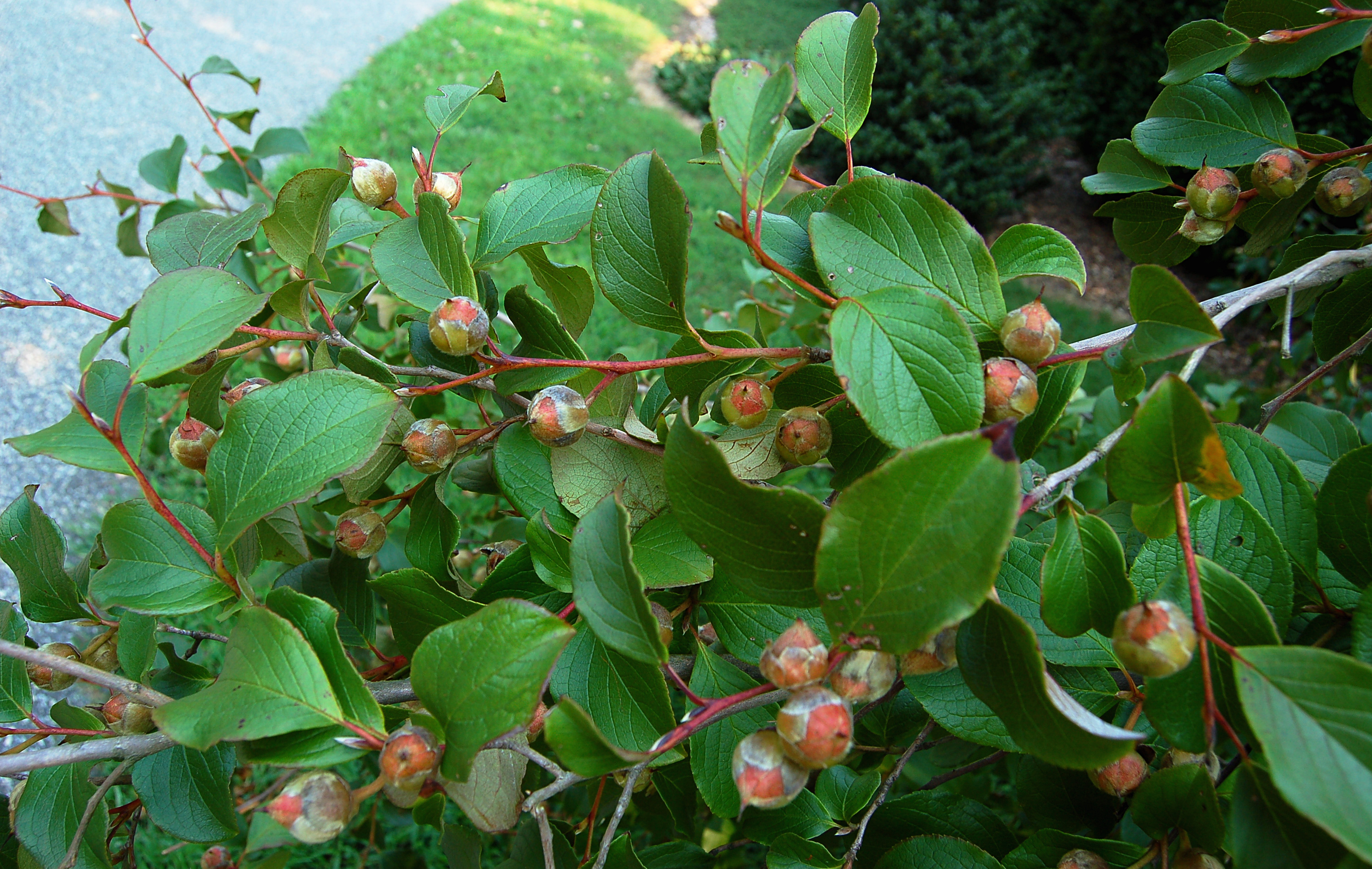
Foliage and fruit

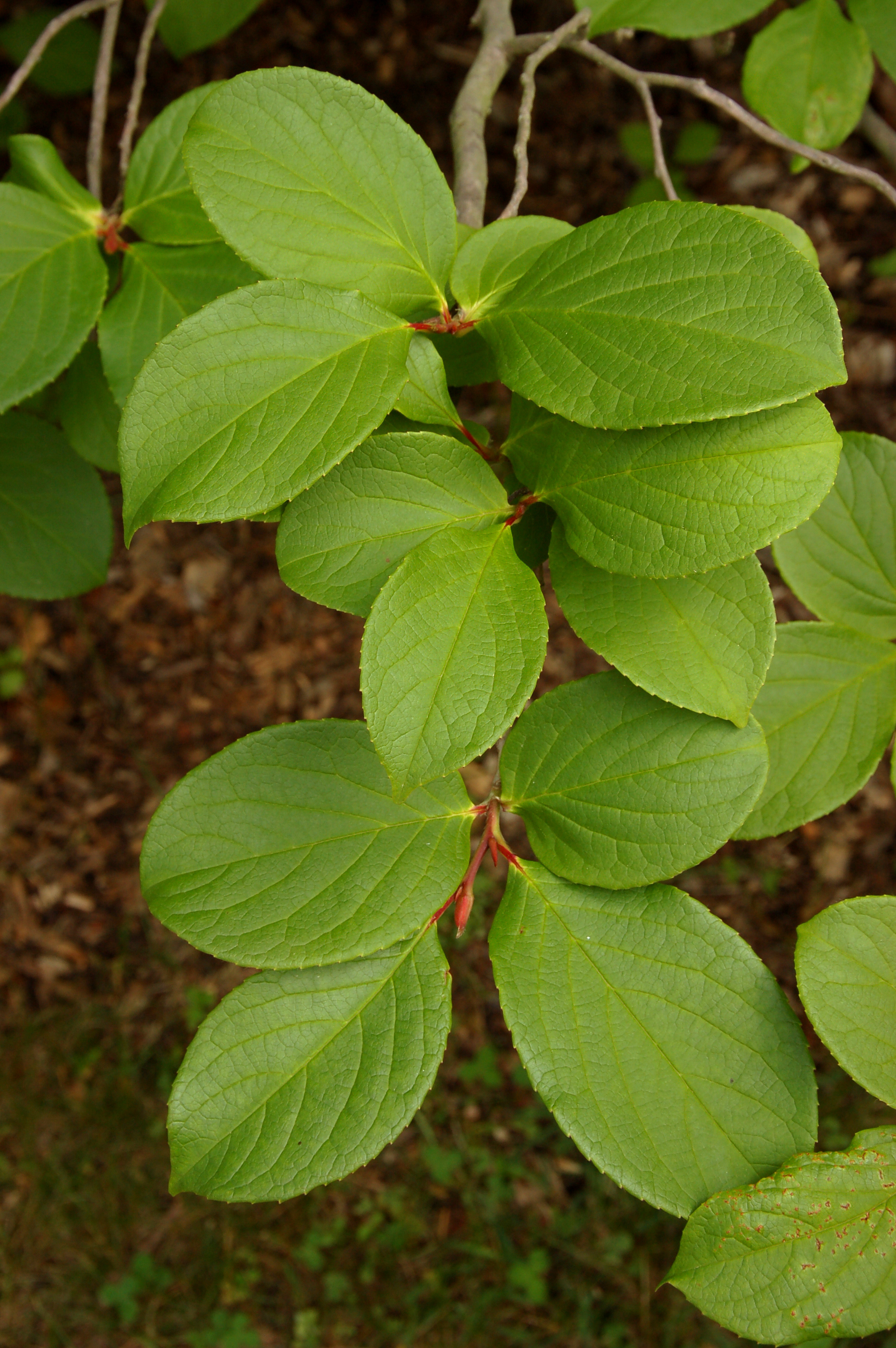
Foliage

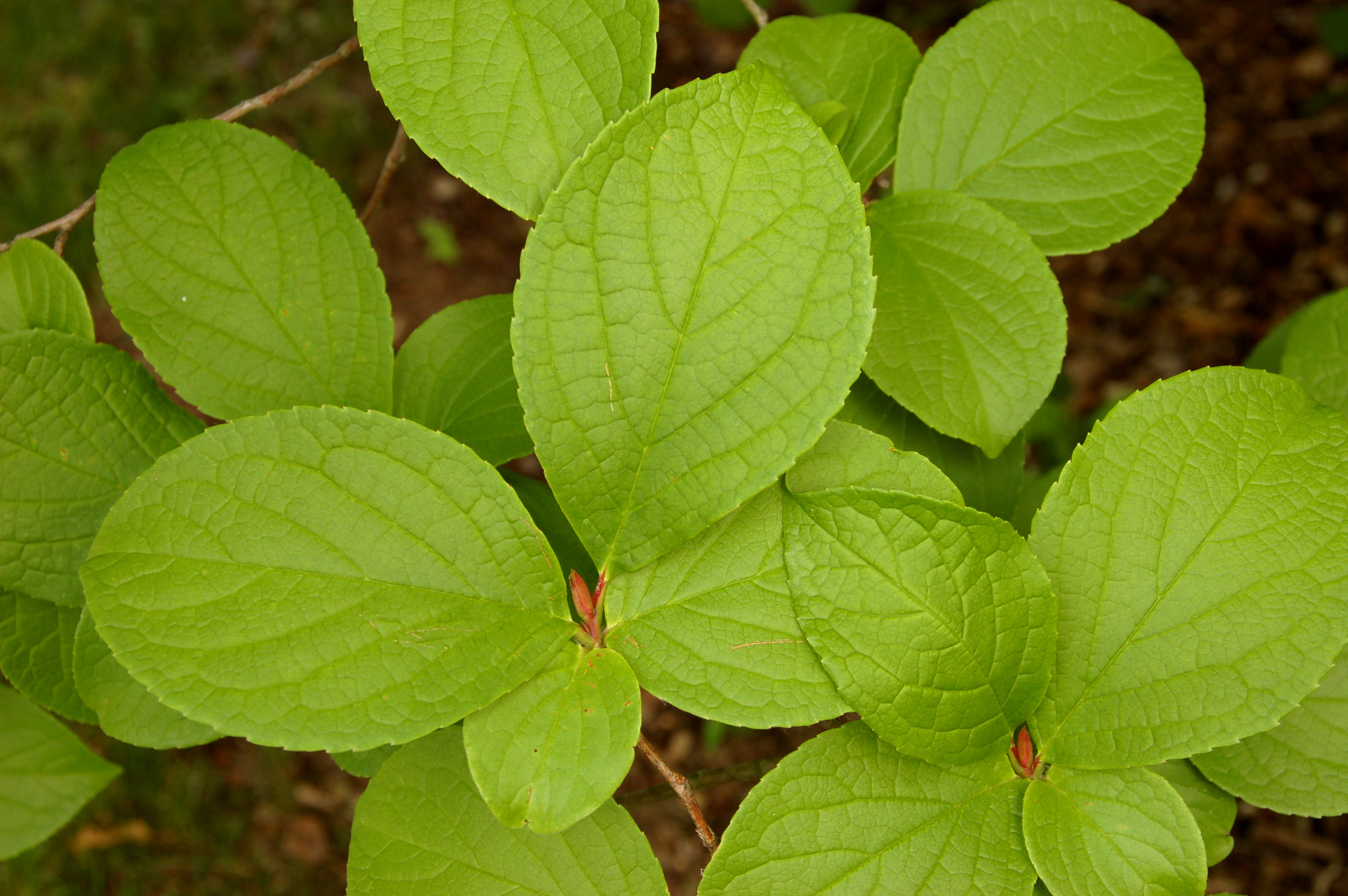
Foliage closeup

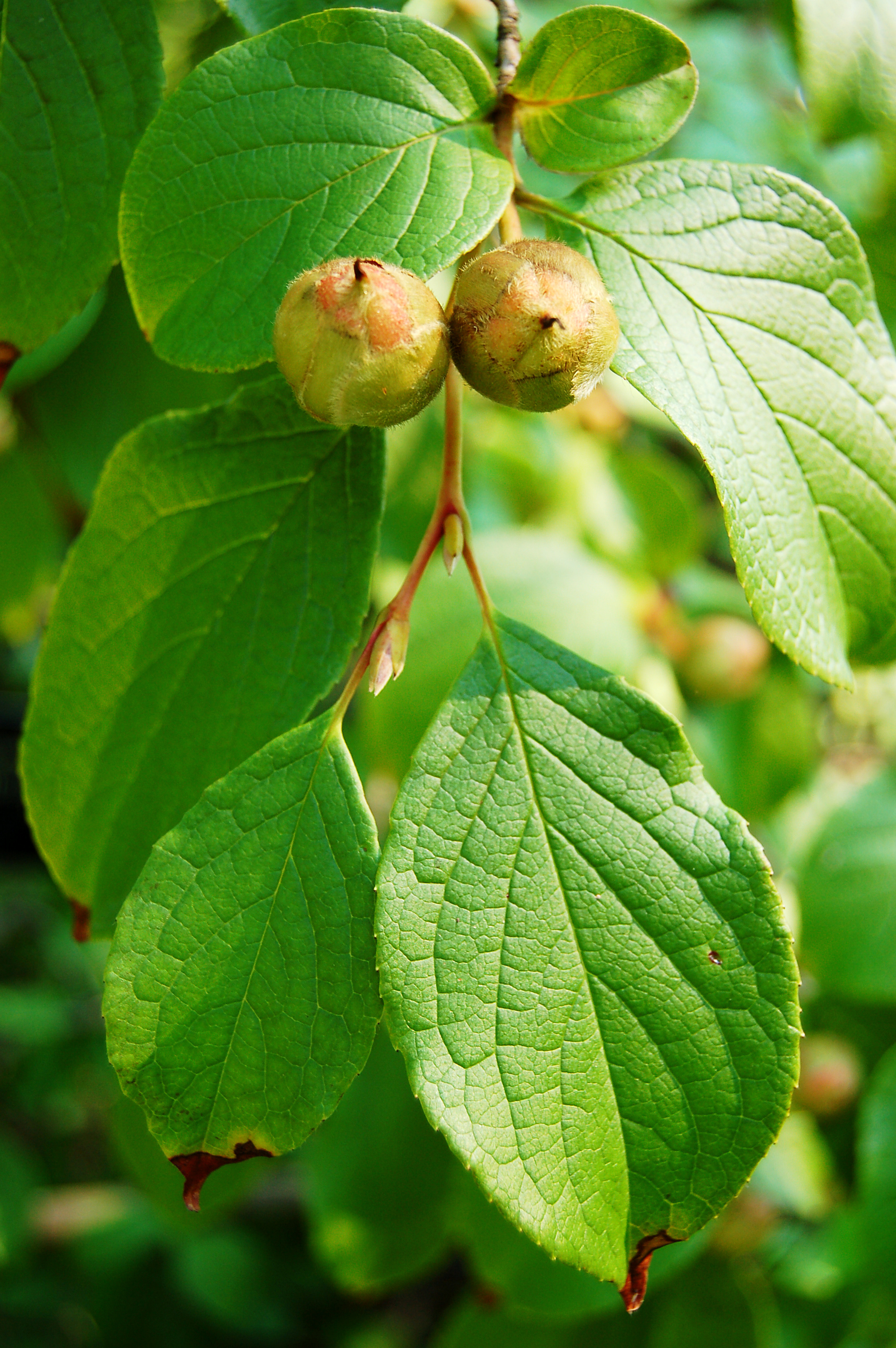
Foliage and fruit

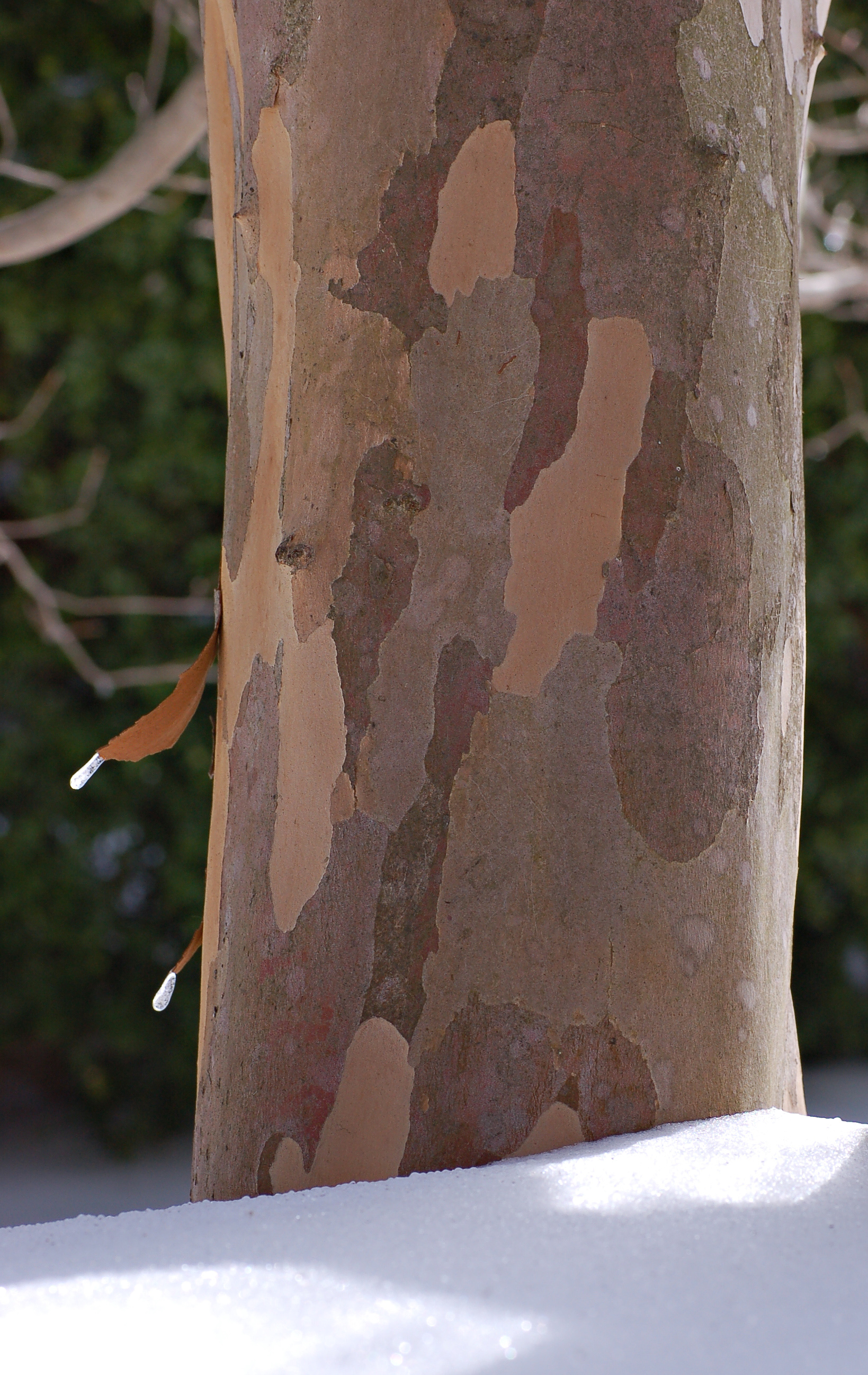
Trunk and distinctive bark

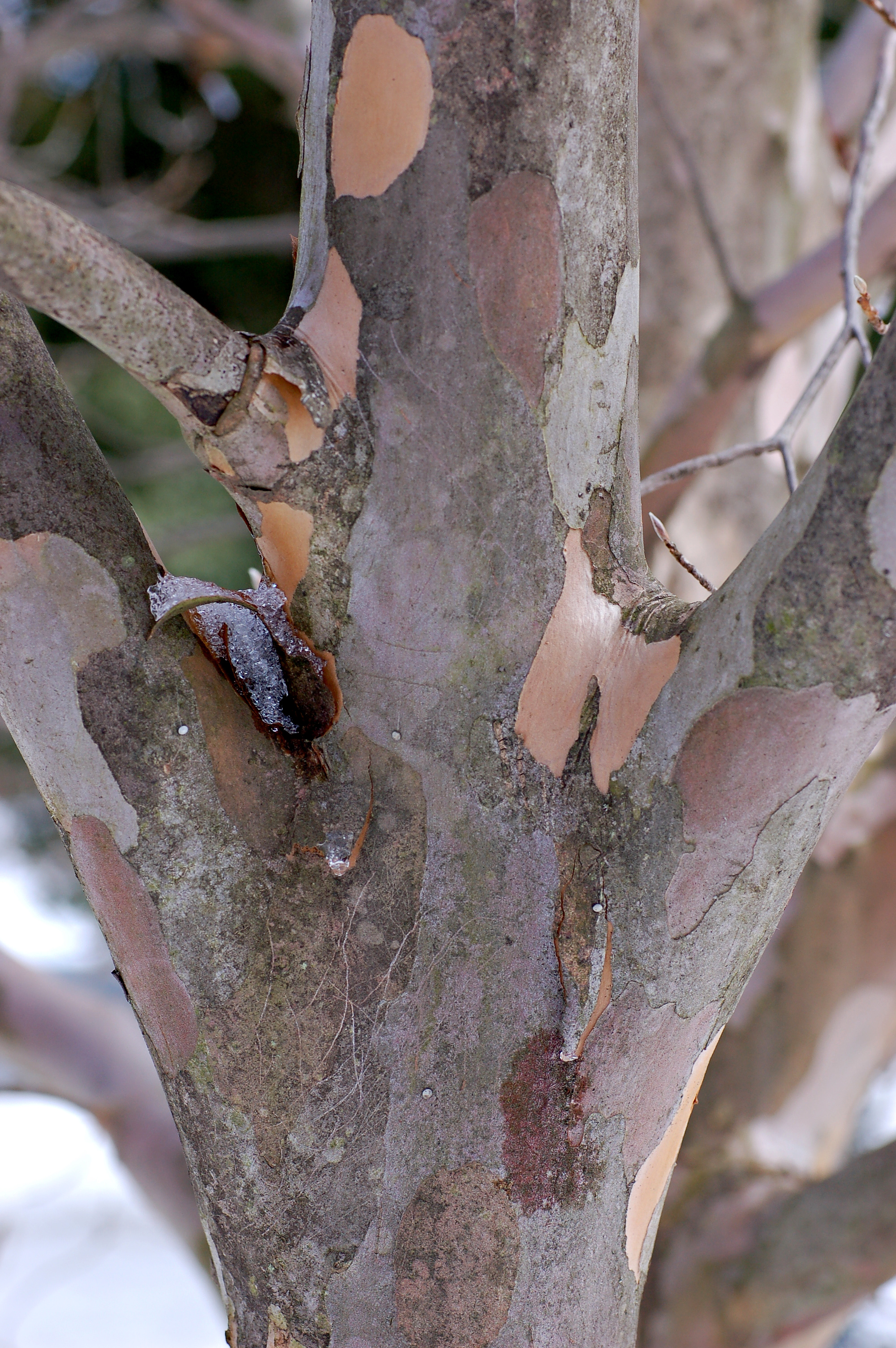
Branching from trunk

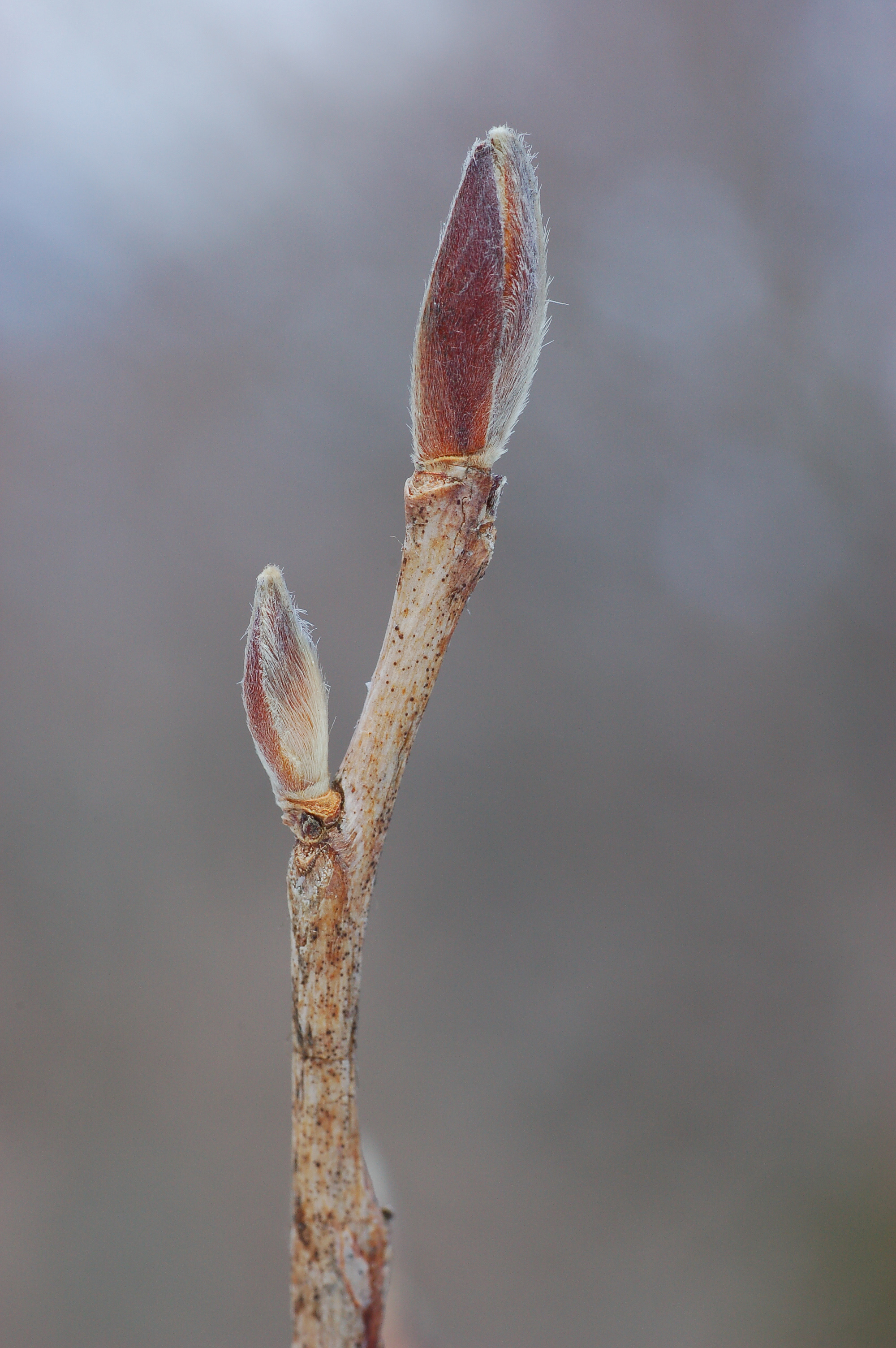
A bud in early spring
