= Kōyasan Shingon-shū =

Japanese sect of Shingon Buddhism

Kōyasan Shingon-shū (高野山真言宗) is a Japanese sect of Shingon Buddhism. Headquartered on Mount Kōya in Wakayama Prefecture, it is also the oldest and largest of the eighteen Shingon sects in Japan. The main temple is Kongōbu-ji. As of 2007, there are nearly 4,000 affiliated Kōyasan Shingon-shū temples in and beyond Japan. There are missions in North America and Hawai'i specifically that function as non-profit arms of the section.
