= List of women comics creators =

This is a list of women and girls who have been involved with producing comic books and comic strips. Many notable female comics creators exist even though the field of comics creation is traditionally male-dominated.

== Africa ==
=== Congo ===
- Fifi Mukuna

=== Egypt ===
- Amaal Khattab
- Deena Mohamed
- Bahiga Thomassian, aka Bhiga

=== Gabon ===
- Sophie Endamne

=== Ivory Coast ===
- Marguerite Abouet – writer of Aya of Yop City

=== Madagascar ===
- Jenny
- M'Aa – makes comics with her husband Xhi

=== Morocco ===
- Riham El-Hour Cartoonist who became professional after winning a UNESCO competition in 2000

=== Mauritius ===
- Annick Sadonnet, aka Sadon, Ajol or Sade

=== South Africa ===
- Marieke Blomerus
- Karen Botha
- Marisa Cloete – Gebuza, To Dig a Big Hole
- Lara-Ann Jibrail
- Mariette Kemp
- Sian Kuiken
- Ingrid van der Merwe
- Ina van Zyl

=== Tanzania ===
- Martha Gellege – Anti Bwalo

== Americas ==
=== Argentina ===
- Maitena Burundarena – Superadas
- Gisela Dester
- Sabrina Florio
- Isol
- Daniela Kantor
- María Delia Lozupone
- Dolo Okęcki

=== Brazil ===
- Erica Awano – Holy Avenger
- Chantal – Juventude
- Priscila Farias
- Raquel Gompy
- Seung Joo-Kang – Disney comics
- Ana-Luiza Koehler – Awrah
- Adriana Melo – notable for her work on the Star Wars: Empire franchise
- Bianca Pinheiro
- Germana Viana

=== Canada ===
- Isabelle Arsenault
- Kate Beaton
- Sandra Bell-Lundy – Between Friends
- Sheree Bradford-Lea
- Emily Carroll
- Svetlana Chmakova – Dramacon (Tokyopop)
- Julie Delporte
- Susan Dewar
- Julie Doucet
- Leanne Franson
- Odette Fumet – newspaper comic strip adaptations of swashbuckler novels, died at age 94
- Pia Guerra – artist, Vertigo's Y The Last Man
- Lynn Johnston – For Better or For Worse
- Molly Kiely
- Sophie Labelle
- Michèle Laframboise
- Gisèle Lagacé – Cool Cat Studio, Penny and Aggie, Ménage à 3
- Yvette Lapointe – Les Petits Espiègles
- Kate Leth – writer, Bravest Warriors (Boom! Comics), Edward Scissorhands (IDW), Adventure Time (Boom! Comics)
- Sam Maggs – Marvel Action: Captain Marvel, Rick & Morty Ever After, Transformers, My Little Pony
- Maia Matches (born in Canada, later moved to the Netherlands)
- Caroline Merola
- Diane Obomsawin – Kaspar, On Loving Women
- Rina Piccolo – Six Chix, Tina's Groove
- Doris Slater
- Fiona Staples – Saga
- Jillian Tamaki – Skim and This One Summer
- Olga Urbansky – Sergeant Renfrew, based on the comedy character by Dave Broadfoot
- Chrissie Zullo
- Zviane

=== Chile ===
- Elena Poirier

=== Mexico ===
- Cecilia Pego
- Yolanda Vargas Dulché

=== United States ===
==== Platinum Age (1897–1937) ====
- Nell Brinkley – The Brinkley Girl
- Mildred Burleigh – Pigtails
- Dot Cochran – Dot and Dodo, Me and My Boyfriend
- Fanny Cory – Other People's Children, Sonny Sayings, Little Miss Muffet
- Grace G. Drayton – Dolly Drake and Bobby Blake in Storyland, The Terrible Tales of Captain Kiddo, Toodles, Dolly Dimples, The Campbell Kids, The Pussycat Princess
- Edwina Dumm – Cap Stubbs and Tippie
- Lovrien Gregory – The Pioneers
- Carol Hager – continued The Adventures of Waddles
- Ethel Hays – Ethel, Flapper Fanny Says, Marianne, Vic and Ethel
- Margaret G. Hays – Jennie and Jack, Also The Little Dog Jap
- Mary A. Hays – Kate and Karol, the Cranford Kids
- Louise Hirsch – Tessie Tish, Charlie Chirps
- Virginia Huget – Gentlemen Prefer Blondes, Flora's Fling, Campus Capers, Miss Aladdin, Molly the Manicure Girl, continued Skippy and Oh Diana
- Fay King – 1910s–1930s cartoons and early autobiographical comics
- Rose O'Neill – Kewpie
- Marjorie Organ – Reggie and the Heavenly Twins, Strange What a Difference a Mere Man Makes, The Wrangle Sisters
- Louise Quarles – Bun's Puns
- Katharine P. Rice – Flora Flirt
- Inez Townsend (born in the U.K., later moved to the U.S.) – Gretchen Gratz, Snooks and Snicks, the Mischievous Twins
- Dorothy Urfer – Annibelle

==== Golden Age/Silver Age (1930s c . 1970) ====
- Nina Albright – artist for comics packager Bernard Baily Studio
- Rosie Arima – Chig, Li'l Eva-Cue
- Ruth Atkinson, aka Ruth Atkinson Ford, R. Atkinson – worked for Fiction House, Timely Comics, Lev Gleason Publications
- Violet Barclay – worked as an inker for Timely/Atlas Comics
- Toni Blum – writer for Eisner & Iger
- Ann Brewster
- Hannah Carter – continued her husband, Ad Carter's series Just Kids as Mush Stebbins and his Sister
- Fanny Cory – Little Miss Muffet
- Jill Elgin – continued Girl Commandos
- Linda Fite – writer for The Cat, Marvel Comics
- Ramona Fradon – worked on Aquaman and Metamorpho, DC Comics; drew Brenda Starr, Reporter
- Barbara Hall – drew for Black Cat, Girl Commandos, the Blonde Bomber
- Ray Herman – 1940s editor at Holyoke Publishing and elsewhere
- Patricia Highsmith – worked for Nedor/Standard/Better Comics and others
- Virginia Hubbell – Charles Biro's ghost writer, Lev Gleason Publications' Crime Does Not Pay
- Joye Hummel – wrote several scripts of Wonder Woman when the original script writer, William Moulton Marston, was too ill to continue on his own
- Alice Kirkpatrick
- Virginia Krausmann – continued Annibelle and Marianne
- Alice Marble – associate editor on Wonder Woman 1941–1945, creator/writer of Wonder Women of History feature 1942–1946
- Lee Marrs – worked for Star Reach
- Elizabeth Holloway Marston – co-creator of Wonder Woman
- Tarpe Mills, pseudonym of June Mills – Cat-Man (Holyoke Comics), Miss Fury
- Jackie Ormes – Torchy Brown, Patty-Jo 'n' Ginger
- Ramone Patenaude, aka Pat
- Albertine Randall – The Dumbunnies
- Lily Renée, aka Reney (Lily Renée Wilhelms Peters and Lily Renée Phlllips) – worked for Fiction House and St. John Publications
- Ruth Roche – writer of Phantom Lady (Fox Comics)
- Helene Rother – Jimmy Jupiter
- Marie Severin – worked for EC and Marvel Comics
- Barbara Shermund
- Virginia Smith – co-creator of The Smith Family
- Marcia Snyder – worked for Fiction House
- Daisy Swayze – lettered for Fawcett Comics, sister of artist Marc Swayze
- Esther Takei – Ama-Chan
- Mercy Van Vlack – Miranda the Tease, Green Ghost and Lotus
- Linda Walter – Susie Q. Smith and as illustrator for Bunty
- Tatjana Wood – colorist
- Dorothy Woolfolk, aka Dorothy Roubicek – DC Comics' first woman editor

==== Bronze Age and Modern Age ====
- Laura Allred – colorist
- Sana Amanat – editor, Ms. Marvel (Marvel)
- Sarah Andersen – Sarah's Scribbles; co-creator of Cheshire Crossing
- Fiona Avery
- Samm Barnes – Marvel Comics writer
- Amber Benson – writer, Buffy the Vampire Slayer (Dark Horse Comics
- Karen Berger – editor, DC Comics' Vertigo imprint
- Christina Blanch – writer, editor, Good Boy, Mysterium, The Damnation of Charlie Wormwood
- Maddie Blaustein – writer, Milestone Comics' Hardware
- June Brigman – co-creator of Power Pack (Marvel Comics); final artist Brenda Starr, Reporter
- Madeline Brogan
- Sarah Byam – writer, Black Canary (DC Comics), Mode Extreme (Marvel/Razorline
- Bobbie Chase – Marvel Comics editor
- Roz Chast – New Yorker staff cartoonist The Party After You Left: Collected Cartoons 1995–2003
- Jo Chen – cover artist, Dark Horse Comics's Buffy the Vampire Slayer Season Eight
- Joyce Chin – Wynonna Earp
- Becky Cloonan
- Nancy A. Collins – writer, DC/Vertigo's Swamp Thing
- Amanda Conner – The Pro (Image Comics), Disney's Gargoyles (Marvel Comics)
- Colleen Coover
- Barbara Dale – The Stanley Family
- Rosario Dawson – Occult Crimes Taskforce Image Comics
- Kelly Sue DeConnick – Captain Marvel, Avengers Assemble (Marvel)
- Tania del Rio – Sabrina the Teenage Witch (Archie Comics)
- Rachel Dodson – inker, Marvel and DC
- Colleen Doran – A Distant Soil
- Valerie D'Orazio – assistant editor, DC Comics
- Leigh Dragoon – By the Wayside
- Jo Duffy, aka Mary Jo Duffy – writer and Marvel Comics editor
- Georgia Dunn – Breaking Cat News
- Jan Duursema – Star Wars: Legacy
- Mary Fleener – Slutburger
- Kaja Foglio – Girl Genius
- Robin Furth – The Dark Tower: The Gunslinger Born
- Shaenon K. Garrity – writer, Marvel Comics' Marvel Holiday Special
- Megan Rose Gedris – writer, artist and creator, YU+ME:dream, I Was Kidnapped by Lesbian Pirates from Outer Space (Platinum Studios
- Stephanie Gladden
- Devin Grayson – writer, Arsenal, Batman: Gotham Knights, Catwoman, Nightwing (all DC Comics)
- Pia Guerra – Y The Last Man
- Stephanie Hans – DIE (Image Comics), cover artist (Marvel, DC, Dark Horse, BOOM))
- Jody Houser – writer, Faith (Valiant Comics), Mother Panic (Young Animal), Supergirl (DC Comics), Vox Machina Origins (Dark Horse)
- Judith Hunt – Evangeline (Comico)
- Jenna Jameson – Shadow Hunter
- Avy Jetter – Nuthin' Good Ever Happens at 4 a.m.
- Jenette Kahn – editor and executive, DC Comics
- Carol Kalish – executive, Marvel Comics
- Shawn Kerri – Cracked, CARtoons Magazine
- Barbara Kesel, aka Barbara Randall Kesel – writer, Rogue Angel: Teller of Tall Tales (IDW Publishing)
- Irene Koh – artist of The Legend of Korra: Turf Wars, creator of Afrina and the Glass Coffin
- Kim Krizan – writer, BOOM! Studio comics
- Elaine Lee – writer, Vamps (DC Comics), Saint Sinner (Marvel/Razorline)
- Marjorie Liu – writer, X-23, Black Widow, Dark Wolverine, NYX, Astonishing X-Men (Marvel Comics)
- Nilah Magruder
- Cynthia Martin – artist for (among others) Marvel Comics's Star Wars
- Laura Martin – colorist, Planetary (DC Comics/WildStorm), Astonishing X-Men (Marvel Comics), Ruse (CrossGen
- Tara McPherson – cover artist, Vertigo
- Adriana Melo – Ms. Marvel
- Denise Mina – writer, Vertigo's Hellblazer
- Leah Moore – writer, Wildstorm's Albion
- Mindy Newell – writer/editor, Marvel, DC, and First)
- Ann Nocenti – writer, Daredevil
- Sonia Oback – colorist, Uncanny X-Men, X-23: Target X
- Nnedi Okorafor - Black Panther, Shuri (character), Wakanda Forever
- Glynis Oliver – colorist, X-Men
- Nina Paley – Fluff, The Hots, Nina's Adventures, Mimi & Eunice
- Sara Pichelli – Ultimate Comics: Spider-Man, Guardians of the Galaxy (Marvel Comics)
- Jodi Picoult – writer, DC's Wonder Woman
- Tamora Pierce – writer, Marvel Comics' White Tiger
- Wendy Pini – artist and co-creator, Elfquest (WaRP Graphics), and Masque of the Red Death
- Antonia Pinnola, aka Acerotiburon – Waffley Wedded
- Janice Race – editor, DC Comics
- Barb Rausch
- Amy Reeder – Rocket Girl
- Emma Rios – Pretty Deadly
- Trina Robbins – It Ain't Me, Babe, Wimmen's Comix, Rosie the Riveter
- Sara Ryan – writer, Me and Edith Head
- Diana Schutz – editor, Dark Horse Comics
- Erica Schultz – writer, Daredevil Annual 2018, Revenge: The Secret Origin of Emily Thorne (Marvel Comics)
- Nicola Scott – Birds of Prey
- Cara Sherman Tereno
- Gail Simone – writer, Birds of Prey, Wonder Woman
- Louise Simonson, aka Louise Jones – Power Pack
- Mary Skrenes – Omega the Unknown (Marvel Comics)
- Barbara Slate
- Roxanne Starr – letterer
- Margaret Stohl – writer Mighty Captain Marvel, Life of Captain Marvel, Spider-Man Noir
- Christina Strain – colorist, Runaways and Spider-Man Loves Mary Jane
- Lilah Sturges – writer, Jack of Fables, Everafter, House of Mystery
- Laurie S. Sutton – writer and editor, DC Comics and Marvel Comics
- Babs Tarr – worked on Batgirl
- Cara Sherman Tereno – Arion, Lord of Atlantis, Life With The Vampire
- Jill Thompson – worked on Wonder Woman, Sandman, and her own Scary Godmother series
- Kelly Thompson – writer, Hawkeye, Jessica Jones, Captain Marvel, Rogue & Gambit, Mr. & Mrs. X, Black Widow, West Coast Avengers
- Maggie Thompson – editor, Comics Buyer's Guide magazine
- Kathleen Webb – writer, Betty
- Christina Weir – writer, Oni Press)
- Signe Wilkinson – Family Tree
- G. Willow Wilson – writer, Cairo (Vertigo), Ms. Marvel (Marvel)
- Kim Yale – writer/editor, DC Comics, Marvel Comics, First Comics, and Warp Graphics

==== OEL manga ====
- Tina Anderson – writer, Only Words (Iris Print), Games With Me (The Wild Side), Loud Snow (Gynocrat INK)
- Jo Chen – artist, Digital Manga's In These Words
- Becky Cloonan – artist, AiT/Planet Lar's Demo
- Mary Cagle – artist/writer, Sleepless Domain (Seven Seas)
- Alex de Campi – writer, Kat & Mouse (Tokyopop)
- Amy Kim Ganter – artist/writer, Sorcerers & Secretaries (Tokyopop)
- Holly Golightly, aka Holly G!, Fauve – artist/writer, School Bites (Broadsword Comics)
- Priscilla Hamby – artist
- Lea Hernandez – artist, Marvel Comics' Marvel Mangaverse: Punisher
- Gisele Lagace – artist/writer, Pixie Trix Comix, Archie Comics
- Nina Matsumoto – artist/writer, "Yōkaiden" (Del Rey Manga)
- Amy Reeder – artist/writer, Fool's Gold (Tokyopop)
- Rivkah – artist/writer, Steady Beat (Tokyopop)

==== Alternative comics ====
- Jessica Abel – La Perdida
- Donna Barr – Stinz, The Desert Peach
- Alison Bechdel – Dykes to Watch Out For
- Gabrielle Bell – Lucky
- Lucy Bellwood – 100 Demon Dialogues, Baggywrinkles
- Lee Binswanger
- Angela Bocage – Nice Girls Don't Talk About Sex, Religion and Politics
- Joyce Brabner – Our Cancer Year
- Paige Braddock – Jane's World
- Vera Brosgol
- M.K. Brown – Aunt Mary's Kitchen, Dr. N!Godatu
- Dot Bucher
- Nancy Burton, also known as Nancy Kalish or Hurricane Nancy – Gentle's Tripout, contributed to It Ain't Me, Babe
- Sophie Campbell – Too Much Hopeless Savages, Spooked
- Jennifer Camper
- Carole – published in Breakin' Out in It Ain't Me, Babe
- Geneviève Castrée
- Chynna Clugston – Blue Monday
- Colleen Coover – Small Favors
- Molly Crabapple – Scarlett Takes Mahattan, Backstage at Act-i-vate
- Sophie Crumb – Belly Button
- Dame Darcy – Meat Cake
- Vanessa Davis – Spaniel Rage, Make Me a Woman
- Abby Denson – Tough Love: High School Confidential
- Diane DiMassa – Hothead Paisan – Homicidal Lesbian Terrorist
- Colleen Doran – A Distant Soil
- Julie Doucet – Dirty Plotte
- Debbie Dreschler
- Sarah Dyer
- Joyce Farmer – Tits & Clits Comix
- Karen Favreau – creator, So It Goes...
- Emil Ferris
- Jess Fink – creator, Chester 5000 XYV (Top Shelf)
- Ali Fitzgerald – Drawn to Berlin
- Mary Fleener – Fleener (Zongo Comics
- Shary Flenniken – Trots and Bonnie
- Ellen Forney – I Love Led Zeppelin
- Shaenon Garrity – Narbonic
- Melinda Gebbie – Lost Girls
- Nicole Georges – Invincible Summer
- Roz Gibson – Jack Salem
- Tatiana Gill
- Phoebe Gloeckner – creator, A Child's Life and The Diary of a Teenage Girl
- Roberta Gregory – Naughty Bits
- Mary Hanson-Roberts – Here Comes A Candle
- Jessie Hartland – Steve Jobs: Insanely Great!
- Maria Hoey – works with her brother Peter Hoey on the series Coin-Op
- G.B. Jones
- Megan Kelso – Artichoke Tales
- Lucy Knisley – French Milk, Relish, An Age of License, Displacement (Fantagraphics), Something New
- Aline Kominsky-Crumb – The Bunch, Dirty Laundry Comix
- Krystine Kryttre
- Hope Larson – Gray Horses and Salamander Dream
- Carol Lay – Story Minute, Way Lay
- Amara Leipzig
- Caryn Leschen – Ask Aunt Violet
- Marisa Acocella Marchetto – Cancer Vixen
- Carla Speed McNeil – Finder
- Linda Medley
- Erika Moen – DAR!; artist, Bucko (Dark Horse Comics), Oh Joy Sex Toy
- Diane Noomin – DiDi Glitz
- Christine Norrie – Hopeless Savages
- Mimi Pond - Mimi's Page, Famous Waitress School, Over Easy, The Customer Is Always Wrong
- Liz Prince – Will You Still Love Me If I Wet the Bed
- Trina Robbins – Ms. Tree
- Vanessa Satone – Wasted Minds
- Mari Schaal – Estrus
- Gail Schlesser
- Ariel Schrag – Awkward
- Dori Seda
- Tara Seibel – co-creator/artist/writer, Rock City Terminally Ill (Newcity)
- Christine Shields
- Carole Sobocinski
- Raina Telgemeier – Smile (A Dental Drama)
- Carol Tyler – The Job Thing
- Serena Valentino – Gloomcookie, Slave Labor Graphics
- Sara Varon
- Lauren Weinstein – The Goddess of War
- Julia Wertz – Fart Party, Drinking at the Movies
- Kate Worley – Omaha the Cat Dancer
- Catherine Yronwode – editor-in-chief of Eclipse Comics

==== Comic strips ====
- Margaret Ahern Beano and continued Speck the Altar Boy; under the name "Margarita", Little Reggie; under the name "Peg O'Connell", Our Parish
- Isabella Bannerman – Six Chix
- Lynda Barry – Ernie Pook's Comeek
- Sandra Bell-Lundy – Between Friends
- Barbara Brandon-Croft – Where I'm Coming From
- Marjorie Henderson Buell – Little Lulu
- Kate Carew – Handy Andy, The Angel Child
- Carol Carlson – The Adventures of Waddles
- Nellie Caroll – Lady Chatter
- Natalie d'Arbeloff – Augustine, Blaugustine
- Melissa DeJesus – My Cage
- Edwina Dumm – The Meanderings of Minnie; Cap Stubbs and Tippie
- Jan Eliot – Stone Soup
- Emily Flake – Lulu Eightball
- Allison Garwood – moo
- Anne Gibbons – Eve 'n Steven, continued Six Chix
- Jan Green – Hey Swingy! (also known as Julie)
- Cathy Guisewite – Cathy
- Alex Hallatt – Arctic Circle
- Marion Hull Hammel – continued Goofus and Gallant
- Leslie Harrington – continued Goofus and Gallant
- Marian Henley – Maxine, The Little Bald Headed Girl
- Bunny Hoest – writer The Lockhorns
- Nicole Hollander – Sylvia
- Judith Hunt – Evangeline, The Timbertoes
- Olivia Jaimes – current author of Nancy
- Kelley Jarvis – continued comics starring Tom & Jerry, Mighty Mouse
- Lynn Johnston – For Better or For Worse
- Carolyn Kelly – worked on Pogo
- Selby Kelly – worked on Pogo
- Terri Libenson – The Pajama Diaries
- Marty Links – Emmy Lou
- Karen Matchette – worked on Dennis the Menace, The Flintstones comics and assisted on For Better or For Worse
- Anni Matsick – continued Goofus and Gallant
- Linda Medley
- Dale Messick – Brenda Starr, Reporter
- Karen Montague-Reyes – Clear Blue Water
- Gladys Parker – Mopsy
- Stephanie Piro – Fair Game, Six Chix
- Mary Schmich – final writer of Brenda Starr, Reporter (1985–2011)
- Margaret Shulock – Apartment 3-G, Six Chix
- Dana Simpson
- Elena Steier – The Ramp Rats, The Goth Scouts, The Vampire Bed and Breakfast
- Hilda Terry – Teena
- Carla Ventresca – On A Claire Day, continued Six Chix
- Maurieta Wellman – Goofus and Gallant

==== Indie comics ====
- Toshi J – Admani, The Grey
- Karla Medrano – Luna: The Queen of Mahru

=== Uruguay ===
- Raquel Orzuj

== Asia ==
=== Bahrain ===
- Sara Qaed – political cartoonist

=== China ===
- Shuhui Wang
- Zhang Xiaobai – Si loin et si proche
- Luo Yin

=== India ===
- Shreyas Krishnan
- Parismita Singh

=== Iran ===
- Atena Farghadani
- Marjane Satrapi – Persepolis, Chicken with Plums

=== Israel ===
- Mira Friedmann
- Batia Kolton
- Rutu Modan
- Elisheva Nadal

=== Japan ===
- Chako Abeno – Sola, My-Otome Zwei
- Akira Amano – Reborn!
- Kozue Amano – Aria
- Yasuko Aoike
- Kotomi Aoki – Boku wa Imōto ni Koi o Suru, Kanojo wa Uso o Aishisugiteru
- Ume Aoki – Hidamari Sketch
- Kiyoko Arai – Angel Lip, Ask Dr. Rin!
- Hiromu Arakawa – Fullmetal Alchemist
- Sakura Asagi
- Yū Asagiri – Golden Cain, Midnight Panther
- George Asakura – A Perfect Day for Love Letters
- Hinako Ashihara – Sand Chronicles, Forbidden Dance, Piece – Kanojo no Kioku
- Izumi Aso
- Yuki Azuma – Schoolmate
- Ippongi Bang
- Toriko Chiya – Clover, Tokyo Alice
- Clamp – RG Veda, Magic Knight Rayearth, Cardcaptor Sakura, Angelic Layer, Chobits, Tsubasa: Reservoir Chronicle, xxxHolic
- Shōko Conami - Shinobi Life
- Eiki Eiki – Dear Myself, Train Train, Color
- Nariko Enomoto
- Mihona Fujii – Gals!
- Mari Fujimura – Kyō wa Kaisha Yasumimasu.
- Kazuko Fujita – Makoto Call!, Four Steps to Romance
- Cocoa Fujiwara – dear, Inu x Boku SS
- Hiro Fujiwara – Kaichō wa Maid-sama!
- Moto Hagio
- Nanae Haruno
- Machiko Hasegawa – Sazae-san
- Bisco Hatori – Ouran High School Host Club
- Akiko Higashimura – Kisekae Yuka-chan, Himawari – Kenichi Legend, Mama ha Temparish)
- Asa Higuchi – Big Windup!
- Tachibana Higuchi – Portrait of M and N, Gakuen Alice
- Aoi Hiiragi – Mimi wo Sumaseba
- Matsuri Hino – Vampire Knight
- Saki Hiwatari – Please Save My Earth, Internal Magic
- Katsura Hoshino – D.Gray-man
- Chieko Hosokawa – Attention Please, Crest of the Royal Family
- Yumi Hotta – writer of Hikaru no Go
- Hozumi – Shiki no Zenjitsu, Sayonara Sorcier
- Yukari Ichijo
- Yumiko Igarashi
- Riyoko Ikeda – The Rose of Versailles
- Gō Ikeyamada – Uwasa no Midori-kun!!, Suki Desu Suzuki-kun!!, Kobayashi ga Kawai Sugite Tsurai!!
- Satomi Ikezawa – Guru Guru Pon-chan, Othello
- Ryo Ikuemi – Bara-Iro no Ashita, Kiyoku Yawaku
- Sukune Inugami – Kashimashi: Girl Meets Girl, Renai Distortion, Ashita mo Kotokoto
- Risa Itō – Oi Pītan!!, Oruchuban Ebichu
- Natsumi Itsuki
- Mariko Iwadate
- Kaneyoshi Izumi – Sonnanja neyo
- Yuna Kagesaki – Chibi Vampire
- Narumi Kakinouchi – illustrator of Yakushiji Ryōko no Kaiki Jikenbo, Vampire Princess Miyu
- Yoko Kamio – Boys Over Flowers, Cat Street
- Aya Kanno – Soul Rescue, Blank Slate, Otomen
- Junko Karube
- Haruko Kashiwagi – Hanazono Merry Go Round
- Kazune Kawahara – High School Debut, writer of My Love Story!!
- Yumiko Kawahara
- Mizuki Kawashita – Strawberry 100%, First Love Limited, Anedoki
- Kazumi Kazui – Dōse Mō Nigerarenai
- Izumi Kazuto – Binbō Shimai Monogatari
- Toshie Kihara
- Renjūrō Kindaichi (金田一蓮十郎) – Liar × Liar
- Yuki Kiriga
- Miyuki Kobayashi
- Momoko Kōda – Heroine Shikkaku
- Yun Kōga
- Fumiyo Kōno – Town of Evening Calm, Country of Cherry Blossoms, Kono Sekai no Katasumi ni
- Mitsurō Kubo – Moteki and Again!
- Ryōko Kui – Terrarium in a Drawer, Delicious in Dungeon
- Fusako Kuramochi
- Yuki Kure
- Maki Kusumoto – Kissxxxx, V. Eye, K no Souretsu – The Funeral Procession of K, Die Tödliche Dolis
- Kei Kusunoki – Girls Saurus, Ogre Slayer, Diabolo, Bitter Virgin
- Nao Maita (まいた菜穂) – Age 12
- Miyako Maki
- Sanami Matoh – Fake, By the Sword
- Naoko Matsuda (ja) – Jūhan Shuttai!
- Temari Matsumoto – Kyo Kara Maoh!, Just My Luck, The Loudest Whisper: Uwasa No Futari, Shinobu Kokoro: Hidden Heart, Cause of My Teacher
- Akemi Matsunae
- Hibari Meguro (目黒ひばり) – Seiyū Mashimashi Club
- Mitsukazu Mihara – IC in a Sunflower, Beautiful People, Doll, Haunted House, R.I.P.: Requiem in Phonybrian, The Embalmer
- Rin Mikimoto (ja) – Kin Kyori Renai, Kyō no Kira-kun
- Kanan Minami – Kyō, Koi o Hajimemasu
- Kazuka Minami – My Paranoid Next Door Neighbor
- Tōko Minami (ja) – ReRe Hello
- Ai Minase (ja) – Hachimitsu ni Hatsukoi
- Kazuya Minekura – Saiyuki, Wild Adapter, Saiyuki Ibun, Saiyuki Reload Blast
- Suzue Miuchi
- Kyoko Mizuki – writer Candy Candy
- Hideko Mizuno – Fire!, Honey Honey no Suteki na Bouken
- Junko Mizuno – Pure Trance
- Setona Mizushiro – X-Day, After School Nightmare
- Jun Mochizuki – Pandora Hearts
- Kozueko Morimoto – Deka Wanko, Gokusen, Kōdai-ke no Hitobito
- Milk Morinaga – Kuchibiru Tameiki Sakurairo, Girl Friends
- Akiko Morishima – Hanjuku-Joshi
- Suu Morishita (森下suu) – Like a Butterfly
- Milk Morizono
- Maki Murakami
- Mayu Murata (村田真優) – Nagareboshi Lens
- Mayumi Muroyama
- Aya Nakahara – Love Com, Berry Dynamite
- Hisaya Nakajo – Hana-Kimi, Sugar Princess
- Hikaru Nakamura – Arakawa Under the Bridge, Saint Young Men
- Yoshiki Nakamura – Skip Beat!, Tokyo Crazy Paradise
- Junko Nakano (中野純子) – B-Shock!, Chisa × Pon, Hetakoi
- Nagamu Nanaji – Parfait Tic!
- Kiriko Nananan – blue, Strawberry Shortcakes
- Atsuko Nanba (南波あつこ) – Senpai to Kanojo
- Minako Narita – Cipher, Alexandrite, Hana Yori mo Hana no Gotoku
- Tomoko Ninomiya – Nodame Cantabile
- Keiko Nishi – Sanban-chō Hagiwara-ya no Bijin, Love Song
- Yoshiko Nishitani
- Miho Obana – Kodomo no Omocha
- Akane Ogura – Zettai Heiwa Daisakusen
- Saori Oguri – Is He Turning Japanese?
- Shinobu Ohtaka – Sumomomo Momomo, Magi: The Labyrinth of Magic
- Reiko Okano – Fancy Dance
- Hiromu Ono – Lady Love
- Natsume Ono – Ristorante Paradiso, House of Five Leaves
- Yumiko Ōshima – The Star of Cottonland
- Minami Ozaki
- Mari Ozawa
- Peach-Pit
- Marimo Ragawa – Baby and Me
- Akizuki Risu
- Robico – My Little Monster
- Rieko Saibara – Bokunchi, Mainichi Kaasan, Onnanoko Monogatari, Jōkyō Monogatari
- Fumi Saimon
- Mayu Sakai – Rockin' Heaven
- Io Sakisaka – Strobe Edge
- Momoko Sakura – Chibi Maruko-chan
- Koharu Sakuraba – Kyō no Go no Ni, Minami-ke
- Kanoko Sakurakoji – Backstage Prince, Black Bird
- Erica Sakurazawa
- Machiko Satonaka
- Chika Shiina – creator of 37.5°C no Namida
- Karuho Shiina – Kimi ni Todoke
- Reiko Shimizu
- Takako Shimura – Aoi Hana, Wandering Son
- Mayu Shinjo – Sensual Phrase, Akuma na Eros, Haou Airen, Love Celeb, Ai Ore!
- Chie Shinohara – Ao no Fūin, Romance of Darkness, Red River, Purple Eyes in the Dark
- Aya Shouoto – S.L.H Stray Love Hearts!, Kiss of Rose Princess, He's My Only Vampire
- Fuyumi Soryo
- Keiko Suenobu – Life, Limit)
- Yuki Suetsugu – Chihayafuru
- Akira Sugito - Boku Girl
- Hinako Sugiura
- Miwako Sugiyama (杉山美和子) – True Love
- Hiro Suzuhira – Ginban Kaleidoscope
- Julietta Suzuki
- Haruko Tachiiri
- Megumi Tachikawa
- Kaoru Tada
- Rumiko Takahashi – Urusei Yatsura, Ranma ½, InuYasha
- Hinako Takanaga – Challengers, Little Butterfly, Liberty Liberty!, The Tyrant Falls in Love
- Ichigo Takano (ja) – Yume Miru Taiyō, Orange
- Rica Takashima – Rica 'tte Kanji!?
- Natsuki Takaya – Phantom Dream, Tsubasa: Those with Wings, Songs to Make You Smile, Fruits Basket, Hoshi wa Utau, Liselotte and Witch's Forest
- Yuyuko Takemiya – writer of Evergreen)
- Naoko Takeuchi – Sailor Moon
- Yumi Tamura – Basara, Chicago, 7 Seeds
- Yellow Tanabe – Kekkaishi
- Meca Tanaka – Meteor Prince)
- Arina Tanemura – Full Moon o Sagashite, Kamikaze Kaito Jeanne, Sakura Hime: The Legend of Princess Sakura
- Keiko Tobe – With the Light
- Yana Toboso – Black Butler
- Asami Tojo (東城麻美) – Chimera, X-Kai, Thunderbolt Boys Excite, Love Prism, Only You
- Ema Tōyama – Pixie Pop, Koko ni iru yo!
- Masami Tsuda – Kare Kano, Eensy Weensy Monster, Chotto Edo Made
- Mikiyo Tsuda – The Day of Revolution, Family Complex, Princess Princess
- Shungicu Uchida – Minami-kun no Koibito
- Miwa Ueda – Peach Girl
- Kimiko Uehara
- Chica Umino – Honey and Clover, March Comes in Like a Lion
- Tsunami Umino (ja) – Nigeru wa Haji da ga Yaku ni Tatsu
- Yumi Unita (ja) – Sukimasuki, Bunny Drop
- Yuki Urushibara – Mushishi
- Masako Watanabe
- Taeko Watanabe – Hajime-chan ga Ichiban!, Kaze Hikaru)
- Yuu Watase – Fushigi Yūgi, Ceres, Celestial Legend, Absolute Boyfriend)
- Yū Yabūchi – Mizuiro Jidai, Naisho no Tsubomi, Hitohira no Koi ga Furu
- Murasaki Yamada
- Ryoko Yamagishi
- Ebine Yamaji
- Sumika Yamamoto
- Kazumi Yamashita – The Life of Genius Professor Yanagizawa
- Kyoko Yamashita
- Waki Yamato
- Mari Yamazaki – Thermae Romae)
- Ai Yazawa – Nana
- Akimi Yoshida
- Yuki Yoshihara
- Miki Yoshikawa – Yankee-kun to Megane-chan)
- Fumi Yoshinaga – Antique Bakery, Ōoku: The Inner Chambers)
- Wataru Yoshizumi – Handsome na Kanojo, Marmalade Boy, Ultra Maniac
- Kaori Yuki – Earl Cain, Angel Sanctuary
- Sumomo Yumeka
- Kaworu Watashiya – Kodomo no Jikan, Monster Marriage Shop, Chibi To Boku

=== Kazakhstan ===
- Dilyara Nassyrova

=== Lebanon ===
- Zeina Abirached

=== Malaysia ===
- Sandra Khoo – Claude and Chunkie

=== Mongolia ===
- Zolzaya Batkhuyag

=== South Korea ===
- Iwan – Jiburo Ganeungil, Jumping
- Kang Kyung-ok
- Kwon Gyo-jung
- Kwon Yoon-joo – Snowcat
- Lee Jung-Hyoun
- Lee So-young
- You (born in South Korea, later moved to Belgium)

=== Taiwan ===
- Belle Yang – Hannah Is My Name, Forget Sorrow: An Ancestral Tale

== Europe ==
=== Austria ===
- Dora Dimow
- Marianne Frimberger – Die Fünf Negerlein
- Ulli Lust – Ignatz Award-winning Today is the Last Day of the Rest of Your Life
- Hella Schiefer
- Else Weichberger
- Susi Weigel
- Susanne Wenger

=== Belgium ===
- Rosita Cappaert (born as a woman, later became a transgender man) – Cleef Combe, scriptwriter of De Ever en de Roos
- Eva Cardon, aka Ephameron – Us Two, Together
- Nathalie Carpentier
- Chayé
- May Claerhout – made comics for the magazine Ohee
- Veerle Colle – Colle, graphic novel based on the film Ben X
- Antoinette Collin – Les Naufragés de l'Escalator, Christobald
- Nine Culliford – wife of Peyo, who colorized his comics
- Carine De Brab
- Elfje De Rooster – Remi de Onversaagde
- Phaedra Derhore - (Doorsnee)
- Blanche Dumoulin – made comics for Spirou and was the wife of Rob-Vel*Marianne Duvivier
- Liliane Funcken – made comics for the magazine Tintin with her husband Fred
- Dominique Gillain
- Jeanne and Laure Hovine – Nic et Nac, notable for being the first Belgian female comics artists
- Ilah – Cordelia
- Nina Jacqmin – La Tristesse de l'Éléphant
- Kari – advertising comics
- Karo
- Greet Liégeois – scripted Bessy and ghosted Silberpfeil
- Viviane Nicaise
- Erika Raven – Ripley, Thomas Rindt
- Séraphine, aka Séraphine Claeys
- Cécile Schmitz
- Yasmine Stalpaert
- Tonet Timmermans
- Sylvia Tops – Team Lou
- Ann Van de Velde, aka Carrie Anne – Ridder Geert
- Leen van Hulst
- Katrien Van Schuylenbergh – Oh Dierbaar Vlaanderen..., Merel
- Judith Vanistendael – Dance By The Light of the Moon
- Tine Vercruysse
- Virginie Vertonghen – La Vavache
- Gabrielle Vincent – Ernest & Célestine
- You (born in South Korea, later moved to Belgium)

=== Bosnia ===
- Enisa Bravo
- Helena Klakočar

=== Bulgaria ===
- Elena Stoilova – Is Vasko Alive?

=== Croatia ===
- Ivana Armanini

=== Czechoslovakia/Czech Republic ===
- Helena Bochořáková-Dittrichová – Z Mého Dětství (From my Childhood
- Lucie Lomová

=== Denmark ===
- Birthe Aksby – Lillegut
- Sussi Bech – Nofret
- Christy Bentzon – Lone og lille Lasse
- Lillian Brøgger – Fuglemanden
- Sofie Louise Dam – Hviskeleg
- Ida Gantriis – Frederik og Joachim
- Tatiana Goldberg – Anima, Kijara
- Carla Hansen – co-creator of Rasmus Klump
- Marie Hjuler - Lone og Lille Lasse
- Kirsten Hoffmann – Dorte og Clas
- Line Høj Høstrup – Det rette element
- Angelica Inigo – On/off
- Ina Korneliussen – Små fisk, Æg
- Ingerlise Kristoffersen – Pigen der ledte efter sin egen skygge
- Sabine Lemire – Mira
- Anne Mette Kærulf Lorenzen – Skamlebben
- Tove Norgaard – continued Rasmus Klump
- Gerda Nystad – Evas Hverdag
- Kristina Ricken – Live fra Lolland
- Stine Spedsberg – Stinestregen, Vox
- Karoline Stjernfelt – I morgen bliver det bedre
- Frederikke Tornager – Min nat med dig
- Lisbeth Valgreen – Gaven, Arret
- Ingrid Vang Nyman - (comics based on Pippi Longstocking)
- Rikke Villadsen – Et knald til
- Gerda Wegener
- Nikoline Werdelin – Café, Homo Metropolis
- Henriette Westh – Dorthea
- Pernille Ørum – Hit-Girl

=== Finland ===
- Mari Ahokoivu
- Terhi Ekebom
- Tove Jansson – The Moomins
- Arja Kajermo – Dublin Four, Tuula
- Ina Kallis
- Kati Kovàcs
- Kaisa Leka
- Aino Louhi
- Pauliina Mäkelä
- Hanneriina Moisseinen
- Nora Paakanen – Ted Dally
- Tiina Paju
- Milla Paloniemi – Kiroileva siilli, Tassutellen
- Kaija Papu
- Kati Rapia – Lonkka, Yellow Bird
- Jenni Rope – Miss Simon Ginlemon
- Anna Sailamaa – Paimen
- Minna Sundberg – A Redtail's Dream and Stand Still. Stay Silent
- Katri Supiläinen
- Aino Sutinen
- Tiitu Takalo
- Katja Tukiainen
- Riita Uusitalo
- Amanda Vähämäki
- Emmi Valve
- Julia Vuori – Sika

=== France ===
- Marguerite Abouet – Aya of Yopougon
- Peggy Adam – Luchadoras
- Lucie Albon – Le Voeu de Marc
- Algésiras
- Amandine – Mistinguette
- Aurélia Aurita
- Pénélope Bagieu – My Quite Fascinating Life, Joséphine, Exquisite Corpse
- Anne Baltus
- Stéphanie Bellat – Princesse Libellule
- Françoise Bertier – Line
- Claire Bouilhac – Francis Blaireau Farceur
- Marie-Madeleine Bourdin – Titounet et Titounette
- Elsa Brants
- Claire Bretécher – Les Frustrés
- Lætitia Brochier
- Camille Burger
- Marie Caillou
- Florence Cestac – Cestac pour les grands
- Cécile Chicault
- Nicole Claveloux
- Daphné Collignon – Flora et les Étoiles Filantes
- Chloé Cruchaudet
- Mariel Dauphin – comics based on novels
- Clio De Frégon – Charlie, Ma Vie de Star
- Marie-Christine Demeure
- Bernadette Després – Tom-Tom and Nana
- Isabelle Dethan
- Lucie Durbiano
- Marie Duval – Ally Sloper
- Nathalie Ferlut – Ether Glister
- Kate J. Fricero – Les Distractions de Mll Nini
- Geneviève Gautier – created the comic Les Aventures du Pingouin Alfred at age 95, making her the oldest person to ever debut as a comics artist
- Hélène Georges
- Annie Goetzinger – Félina, Aurore, La Demoiselle de la Légion d'honneur, Agence Hardy
- Virginie Greiner – Secrets
- Anne Guillard – Valentine, Ma Vie d'Ado, Les Pipelettes
- Joly Guth
- Loo Hui Phang
- Manon Iessel – Capucine
- Marie Jaffredo – Yuan: journal d'une adoption
- Catherine Labey (born in France, later moved to Portugal)
- Oriane Lassus – Spongiculture
- Sandrine Lemoult
- Samantha Leriche-Gionet (Boum) – Boumeries
- Patricia Lyfoung – La Rose Écarlate
- Lisa Mandel
- Jul Maroh – Blue Is the Warmest Colour
- Catherine Meurisse – Elza
- Laureline Michaut, aka Laurel – Le Journal de Carmilla, Cerise, Les Énigmes de Violette
- Marion Montaigne – Tu Mourras Moins Bête
- Chantal Montellier – 1996
- Aurélien Morinière
- Françoise Mouly
- Colonel Moutarde
- Catel Muller
- Aurélie Neyret, aka Clo
- Collette Pattinger
- Françoise Pichard, aka Chard, Pscharr
- Marie Pommepuy – half of the duo Keracoët
- Sandrine Revel
- Anouk Ricard
- Rosalys
- Annick Sadonnet, aka Sadon, Ajol or Sade
- Marjane Satrapi (born in Iran, later moved to France) – Persepolis
- Joëlle Savey
- Johanna Schipper (known as "Johanna")
- Anne Simon – author of The Song of Aglaia (Fantagraphics)
- Maly Siri
- Solveg – Betty
- Audrey Spiry
- Roxanne Starr
- Irène Stegmann
- Caroline Sury
- Tanxxx
- Annette Tison – Barbapapa
- Vanyda
- Valérie Vernay – Agathe Saugrenu
- Chloé Wary
- Claire Wendling

=== Germany ===
- Franziska Bilek
- Naomi Fearn – Zuckerfish
- Aisha Franz
- Kristina Gehrmann – Im Eisland
- Dagmar Geisler
- Cornelia Geppert – continued Abrafaxe
- Edith Hegenbarth – worked on Digedags
- Jule K
- Kathi Kaeppel
- Hyuna Kang
- Nora Krug
- Anke Kuhl
- Marie Marcks
- Edith Oppenheim-Jonas (born in Germany, spent her life in Switzerland) – Papa Moll
- Marika Paul
- Elizabeth Pich – War and Peas
- Annegret Reimann
- Lona Rietschel – Abrafaxe
- Elke Steiner
- Ulrike Uhlig
- Irmtraut Winkler-Wittig – worked for Hannes Hegen
- Barbara Yelin
- Minou Zaribaf
- Gisela Zimmermann

=== Greece ===
- Alkmini Grammatopoulou
- Zoe Skiadaresi – Bampoudas

=== Hungary ===
- Gabriella Baracsi
- Miriam Katin
- Lívia Rusz

=== Ireland ===
- Elizabeth Shaw – Sonntagmorgen

=== Italy ===
- Mirka Andolfo
- Bianca Bagnarelli
- Laura Bozzano – Disney comics
- Anna Brandoli – La Strega, Cuba 42
- Lina Buffolente – Piccolo Ranger, Comandante Mark
- Barbara Canepa – Disney comics
- Giovanna Casotto
- Barbara Ciardo
- Adriana Cristina – Disney comics
- Iris De Paoli
- Anna Maria Falcetti – Looney Tunes comics, Disney comics, Bobo
- Liliana Fantoni
- Monica Ferrone – Xtina
- Elena de' Grimani – Rigel)
- Adriana Lobello
- Paola Lombroso
- Nives Manara - (Alis, worked on Dylan Dog)
- Elisabetta Melaranci – Disney comics
- Anna Merli – Disney comics
- Gabriella Molisso
- Grazia Nidasio – Valentina Mela Verde, Steffi
- Sara Pichelli – Marvel Comics
- Elisa Picuno – Disney comics
- Antonella Platano
- Valeria Turati – Geronimo Stilton, Bobo, Disney comics
- Antonella Vicari
- Vanna Vinci – La Bambina Filosofica
- Luisa Zancanella – worked on Martin Mystère
- Melissa Zanella
- Rafaella Zardoni
- Silvia Ziche – Disney comics
- Laura Zuccheri – Hardware, Julia, worked on Ken Parker

=== Latvia ===
- Ingrida Picukane
- Dace Sietina – Life Is A Bitch

=== Luxemburg ===
- Pascale Velleine – Jamie Bond

=== Netherlands ===
- Fieke Asscher – De Rare Belevenissen van Professor Stap-door-den-Tijd
- Anne van Baarle – De Ware Geschiedenis van Aspoetser
- Merel Barends
- Marjolein Bastin
- Nel van Beek – Dol en Mina
- Agnes van Belle – Het zal wel
- Irene Berbee – Ulfbehrt, worked on Jan, Jans en de Kinderen
- Nelly Bodenheim
- Wilma van den Bosch – Disney comics
- Willeke Brouwer – Ongelooflijke Bijbelverhalen
- Linda van Bruggen
- Peti Buchel
- B. Carrot – Alle Dagen Ui
- Rie Cramer
- Els Deckers, aka Vosje
- Mies Deinum
- Marissa Delbressine
- Phiny Dick – Olle Kapoen, Birre Beer
- Eveline van Dijk – made comics promoting trepanation, based on the theories of Bart Huges
- Marianne Eigendaal – Het Kuurhuis
- Linda van Erve
- Henrieke Goorhuis – Het Lastpak
- Dorith Graef – Nena's Vlog
- Renske de Greef – Renske Stript
- Sandra de Haan
- Fritzi Harmsen van Beek – continued Flipje van Tiel
- Maaike Hartjes – Maaike's Dagboek
- Nelleke Haverhals – Roos
- Margreet de Heer – Discoveries in Comics
- Eva Hilhorst
- Gerrie Hondius – Ansje Tweedehansje
- Nova de Hoo - (Shaya's Dagboek, Bibi en Bikkel)
- Dilys de Jong – 5x30
- Aimée de Jongh – Snippers
- Patty Klein – Noortje
- Simone Koch – made a promotional comic for comics store Lambiek
- Gradie Knipscheer – Keesje Konijntje
- Alice Kok
- Judy Koot
- Rie Kooyman – Hoki en Poki
- Melanie Kranenburg - (Naasten)
- Marjolein Krijger
- Greetje Kroone
- Andrea Kruis – continued Jan, Jans en de Kinderen
- Liesbeth Labeur
- Freddie Langeler – Pietje Pluk en Kootje Kwak, Bobby den Speurder, Barendje Kwik, Bello Blafmeier
- Jolet Leenhouts – De Vier-Vijf-Zes
- Nans van Leeuwen – Piggelmee
- Lonneke Leever
- Anne van de Leur
- Maia Matches (born in Canada, moved to the Netherlands) – Ruby Riveter, Bitch
- Ellen Meske – Merik de Meeuw
- Johanna Bernardina Midderigh-Bokhorst
- Sandra Nieuweboer – Karin, Beppen
- Evi Nijs – Alex en het feest van Jeroen Bosch
- Mary Oosterdijk - (assisted on Kappie)
- Coco Ouwerkerk – Acception
- Georgien Overwater – Sjanie, Bart en Bob, Hungry Jack
- Harriët van Reek
- Renée Rienties
- Joanika Ring
- Emma Ringelding
- Maartje Schalkx
- Coq Scheltens-Jongkind – Scoutertje, Dikkie
- Willy Schermelé
- Marieke Scholten
- Nora Schnitzler – Keesje Knabbel
- Willy Smit – Tijs Wijs De Torenwachter
- Anne and Eva Staal, aka De Stalinskis
- Sandra Kleine Staarman
- Sabine van der Stadt – Big
- Barbara Stok – Barbaraal
- Gwen Stok – comics adaptations of the short stories by Toon Tellegen
- Marlon Teunissen
- Magda van Tilburg – makes comic books in Latin and Ancient Greek
- Jip van den Toorn
- Marjorie Velthuyse – Izzie, Suul & Juul
- Toby Vos, aka Neeltje Vos
- Marloes de Vries – Lotta
- Marijn van der Waa – Hibou
- Fiep Westendorp – Jip en Janneke
- Nettie van Wijland – De Avonturen van Tijs Loerendraaier en Dikkie Duik
- Henriette Willebeek le Mair
- Juliette de Wit
- Leny Zwalve

=== Norway ===
- Anna Fiske
- Karine Haaland
- Lise Myhre
- Solveig Muren Sanden – continued Tuss og Troll and Smørbukk
- Hanne Sigbjørnsen
- Inga Sætre
- Vivian Zahl Olsen – Småtte

=== Poland ===
- Elisabeth Brozowska – Josephine

=== Portugal ===
- Joana Afonso (O Bestiário de Isa)
- María Alcobre
- Rita Alfaiate
- Bixa – Laçarote e Pantalonas, 3 de Braço Dado
- Teresa Camara Pestana
- Isabel Carvalho
- Ana Cortesão
- Helena Dias
- Catherine Labey (born in France, later moved to Portugal)
- Joana Lafuente (Transformers)
- Isabel Lobinho
- Ofélia Marques, aka Ofélia
- Susa Monteiro
- Joana Mosi
- Guida Ottolini
- Maria Emília Roque Gameiro, aka Màmia
- Raquel Roque Gameiro
- Joana Rosa (TMG – The Mighty Gang, Dreamland Protectors)

=== Romania ===
- Aitch
- Louise Hirsch (born in Romania, moved to the U.S.) – Tessie Tish, Charlie Chirps
- Irina Georgeta Pusztai
- Veronica Solomon

=== Russia ===
- Svetlana Chmakova – artist/writer, Dramacon (Tokyopop)
- Tatyana Gnisiuk
- Tanja Neljubina

=== Scotland ===
- Karrie Fransman – The House That Groaned, Death of the Artist, The Darkness Behind Our Eyes, Gender Swapped Fairy Tales
- Lorna Miller – artist/writer: Witch; contributor: Girlfrenzy, The Comics Journal, The Ramones Box Set, Vice; artist/colourist: Thomas the Tank Engine, Toxic, Ben 10, Powerpuff Girls, Moshi Monsters

=== Spain ===
- Sònia Albert – Professor Breinstein, Disney comics
- Meritxell Andreu – Disney comics
- Lola Anglada
- Juliana Bach – Bunty and Mandy, also known as Marnie en Sanne
- Flavita Banana
- Carmen Barbará – Mary Noticias
- Isabel Bas – Ana-Emilia y su Familia
- Míriam Bonastre Tur – Hooky
- Purita Campos – Patty's World
- Anabel Colazo
- Cristina Durán Costell
- Rosa Galcerán
- Esther Gonzàlez – Miss Pad Thai
- Carmen Levi – continued Pif le chien, religious comics
- Pilar Mir – Ana Belén
- Ana Miralles – Djinn
- Roser Oduber
- Ana Oncina
- Pepita Pardell
- Maria Pascual Alberich – Rosa Blancas, Sissi
- Moderna de Pueblo
- Laura Pérez Vernetti
- Margarita Querol Manzano – Disney comics
- Raquel Riba
- Lourdes Rueda Sala – Disney comics

=== Sweden ===
- Ottilia Adelborg
- Christina Alvner – Coco
- Inger Edelfeldt – Hondjuret
- Åsa Ekström
- Michaela Favilla – worked on the Mamma Mu series
- Susanne Fredelius
- Kerstin Frykstrand – Muff och Tuff
- Anneli Furmark
- Annika Giannini – Illustrator Man, Övergångsstället, Roberts vänne, Folk och fä
- Ester Gill – Lillans Morgongröt, Den Egenkära Gunilla, Sara
- Gunna Grähs
- Stina Hjelm
- Jenny Holmlund
- Johanna Kristiansson – Katten Nils
- Eva Lindström
- Bia Melin – continued Agust och Lotta
- Coco Moodysson
- Lina Neidestam
- Gunila Stierngranat – Lila Lena och Jon Blund, Lille Göran och Jon Blund, Lasseman och Hans Vänner, Snövit, Morfars Barndomsminnen, Eva-Maria och Ingegegerd
- Liv Strömquist – 100 Procent
- Minna Sundberg – A Redtail's Dream, Stand Still, Stay Silent
- Cecilia Torudd – Ensamma mamman
- Margit Uppenberg, aka Gobi – Pian
- Natalie Zimmerman

=== Switzerland ===
- Frida Bünzli, pseudonym of Debra Bühlmann-Drenten
- Odrade
- Edith Oppenheim-Jonas (born in Germany, spent her life in Switzerland) – Papa Moll
- Corinne Schroff
- Anna Sommer – Damen Dramen
- Valp (Valentine Pasche) – Lock, Ashrel
- Judith Zaugg

=== Turkey ===
- Selma Emiroğlu
- Ramize Erer

=== United Kingdom ===
- Janet Ahlberg
- Wendy Arnot – worked on Rupert Bear
- Enid Ash – worked on Rupert Bear
- Mabel Lucie Attwell – Wot A Life
- Gabrielle Bell – Lucky
- Hannah Berry – Britten and Brülightly, Adamtine, Vox Pop, LiveStock, Premeditations
- Hilda Boswell – Strongheart
- Vera Bowyer
- Jenny Butterworth – Tiffany Jones
- Katriona Chapman – Katzine, Follow Me In, Breakwater
- Kate Charlesworth – Sally Heathcote: Suffragette
- Sue Coe
- Gillian Crampton Smith
- Evelyn Flinders – The Silent Three
- Barbara C. Freeman
- Dora Gibbon – Muffy in Moonland
- Isabel Greenberg – The Encyclopedia of Early Earth
- Alex Hallatt – Arctic Circle
- Dawn Hargy – The Fabulous Baker Girls)
- Laura Howell – Johnny Bean from Happy Bunny Green, Les Pretend, Tricky Dicky and the manga adaptation of The Beano
- Yvonne Hutton – worked on Roy of the Rovers
- Helen Jacobs
- Lee Kennedy
- Jennifer Kisler – continued Rupert Bear
- Kat Kon
- Sonia Leong
- Lucy Matthews – assisted on Rupert Bear
- Kathleen McDougall – worked on Rupert Bear
- Marjorie Owens – worked on Rupert Bear
- Annie Parkhouse
- Philippa Perry – Couch Fiction
- Dora Royle
- Kate Sheppard – Horrible Histories
- Posy Simmonds – Gemma Bovery, Tamara Drewe
- Mary M. Talbot – Sally Heathcote: Suffragette, Dotter of Her Father's Eyes
- Mabel Francis Taylor – The Little Sparrowkins, continued Jungle Jinks
- Pat Tourret – Tiffany Jones
- Mary Tourtel – Rupert Bear
- Inez Townsend (born in the U.K., later moved to the U.S.) – Gretchen Gratz, Snooks and Snicks, the Mischievous Twins
- Amby Vaingankar – AmbyComics, also known as Gotta Sketch 'Em All
- Suzy Varty – Heröine, Mama! dramas, Nelson
- Emma Vieceli
- Laura Watton – Biomecha

== Oceania ==
=== Australia ===
- Moira Bertram – Jo
- Queenie Chan – The Dreaming, Tokyopop
- Elizabeth Durack – Nungalla and Jungalla
- Cecilia May Gibbs – Bib and Bub, Tiggy Touchwood
- Nicki Greenberg
- Sarah Howell
- Marguerita – Zyg & Mea
- June Mendoza
- Jenia Meng
- Kathleen O'Brien – Wanda the War Girl
- Mandy Ord
- Carolyn Ridsdale
- Madeleine Rosca – Hollow Fields
- Nicola Scott
- Nicole Skeltys – Pigeon Coup
- Ruth Vickery – Betty and Bill, Molly the Mermaid

=== New Zealand ===
- Sharon Alston – made comics for Broadsheet
- Kim Casali – Love is...

== See also ==
- Friends of Lulu
- List of 20th century women artists
- List of feminist comic books
- List of feminist literature
- Portrayal of women in American comics
- Women artists
