= Paula Cheshire =

Spanish cartoonist and illustrator (born 1993)

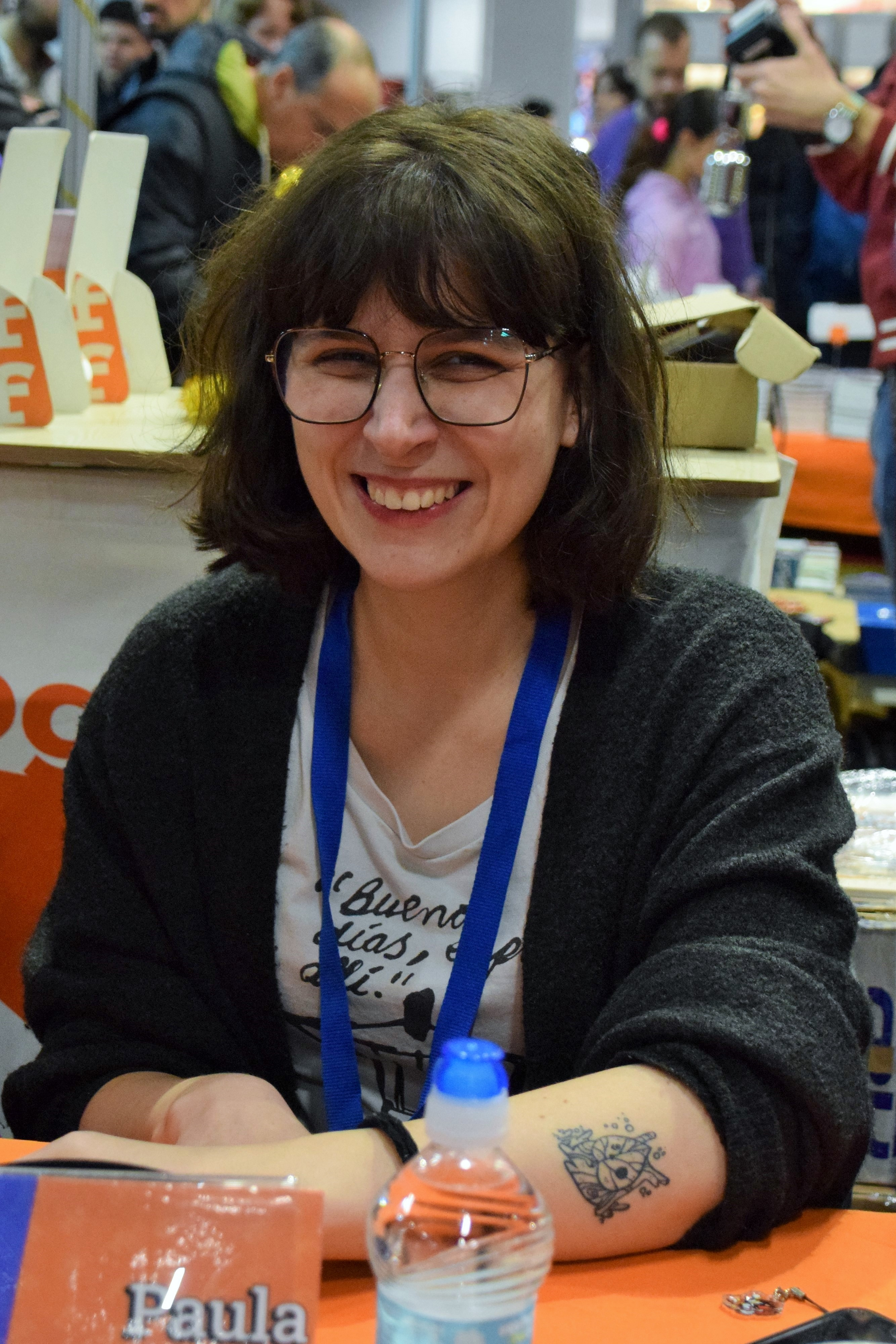
- Paula in 2023
- Born: Paula García Vázquez; 6 April 1993 (age 33); Pontevedra, Galicia, Spain
- Education: Antonio Faílde School of Art and Design
- Occupations: Cartoonist; illustrator
- Website: paulacheshire.com

Paula García Vázquez (born 6 April 1993), pen name Paula Cheshire, is a Spanish cartoonist and illustrator.

== Early life and education ==
Vázquez was born in Pontevedra, and she is left handed. She originally enrolled in fine arts at the Antonio Faílde School of Art and Design, Ourense, but she did not complete the first year after realising that it was not for her. She then made the transition to graphic design, and in 2021 she started working for herself as a freelancer. She is especially interested in children's illustrations and comics.

== Career ==
Her writings focus on subjects including health and mental illness, and became increasingly popular in the wake of the COVID-19 pandemic.

She has written fanzines such as Me das ansiedad and has been in "¡Zuzumba!" and "Dance with Me." She uses social media extensively. In 2019, she took part in the Tales to understand the planet project and drew the narrative A treasure for Martín de Ana and Lucía Riveiro Mouzo.

The death of her mother from cancer in 2019 inspired her novel El duelo. She explained: "I titled it like this, relating it to those phases that they say everyone goes through in those situations: anger, negotiation, depression and acceptance." Me das ansiedad and El duelo establish a connection between her cartooning and that of several other modern cartoonists whose lives serve as their subject matter.

She has attended events including the Madrid Comic Pop Up, the Salón del Comic deGuecho (Vizcaya), the Zaragoza Comic Show, Japan Weekends in Bilbao and Valencia, and Viñetas desde el Atlántico of La Coruña.

== Styles and themes ==
Vázquez's work is known for its humour, including in autobiographical comic strips that discuss topics such as her anxiety issues.

She reads comics as well as children's literature like Tintin, Asterix, and Mafalda.

She was inspired by Sarah Andersen, and is an admirer of illustrators including Agustina Guerrero, Lola Vendetta, and Ana Oncina.

== Works ==
=== Author ===
- Paula Cheshire (6 October 2022). El duelo (in Spanish) (1st ed.). Fandogamia Editorial, C.B. p. 112. ISBN 978-8418419690.
- Paula Cheshire (20 June 2023). Me das ansiedad (in Spanish). Fandogamia Editorial, C.B. p. 120. ISBN 978-8418419874.
- Paula Cheshire; Paula Carballeira (18 January 2024). Wombo Combo (INFANTIL E XUVENIL - MERLÍN E-book) (in Galician) (Galician ed.). Edicións Xerais. p. 73. ISBN 978-8418419874.

=== Illustrator ===
- Lingua galega e Literatura. 6 Primaria. Revoa (in Galician). XERME. 30 April 2023. p. 296. ISBN 978-8419101501.
- Miquits (in Spanish). Antela Editorial. 16 September 2022. p. 56. ISBN 978-8412545210.

== Awards and recognitions ==
In 2023, she won the best author prize at the Salón del Cómic de Valencia for her book El duelo. She was also nominated in the same category at the Salón del Cómic de Barcelona.
