= Hotakainen =

Hotakainen is a Finnish-language surname. Notable people with the surname include:

- Kari Hotakainen (born 1957), Finnish writer
- Valtteri Hotakainen (born 1990), Finnish ice hockey player
- Fictional characters:
  - Tuuri, Lalli and Onni Hotakainen, main characters in the webcomic Stand Still, Stay Silent
