= Lyfoung =

Lyfoung is a surname of Asian origin. Notable people with the surname include:

- Patricia Lyfoung (1977–2025), French cartoonist of Hmong origin
- Touby Lyfoung (1919–1979), Hmong political and military leader
