= Oncina =

Oncina is a Spanish surname. Notable people with the surname include:

- Ana Oncina (born 1989), Spanish comic book illustrator and author
- Juan Oncina (1925–2009), Spanish tenor
- Noelia Oncina (born 1976), Spanish handball player
