= Haruka Minami =

Haruka Minami can refer to:

- A character from Minami-ke
- The penname of Kazuka Minami
