= Lomov =

Lomov (Russian: Ломов, from lom = crowbar) is a Slavic male surname. Its feminine counterpart is Lomova. It may refer to:

- Nicolai Lomov (1946–2020), Russian classical pianist
- Yury Lomov (born 1964), Olympic shooter from Kyrgyzstan
- Lucie Lomová (born 1964), Czech comics author
- Nadezda Lomova (born 1991), Russian weightlifter

== See also ==
- Nizhny Lomov, town in Russia
