= Mari Ahokoivu =

Finnish comics writer, illustrator, and graphic novelist

- Born: September 29, 1984 (age 42); Finland
- Occupations: Graphic novel writer, illustrator
- Writing career
- Period: 2007–present
- Notable work: Oksi
- Website: mariahokoivu.com

Mari Ahokoivu (born 29 September 1984) is a Finnish comics writer, illustrator, and graphic novelist.

Drawing comics for both children and adults, she began professionally publishing comics in 2007. Ahokoivu has described the horror genre as one of her biggest inspirations.

In 2009, her debut graphic novel Find Me In This City, was published. Following this she served as a Nordic comics project coordinator at a Finnish comics society. Along with Kalle Hakkola, she published Sanni & Joonas, a media franchise including both comic books and an ongoing comic strip in the Finnish Koululainen magazine.

In 2018, her graphic novel Oksi, following a mother bear was published. It received an English translation, published in 2021.

Ahokoivu received the Puupäähattu prize in 2023 from the Finnish Comics Society.

== See also ==
- List of female comics creators
