= Karen Favreau =

American comic artist

Karen Favreau (July 29, 1968 – July 7, 2010) was an American comic artist known for her short comics. Some of her well known works include the series E-String and So It Goes.... Her work is featured in the anthology Dyke Strippers: Lesbian Cartoonists A to Z.

== Early life and education ==
Karen Favreau was born in Gardner, Massachusetts, on July 29, 1968. She graduated from the University of Massachusetts Amherst with a bachelor's degree in Sociology. Favreau then went on to earn two master's degrees in Library and Information Studies and Counseling and Educational Development from the University of North Carolina (UNCG) in Greensboro. While getting her degree in counseling, she received the Marian Pope Franklin Fellowship Award.

During her time at UNCG, Favreau joined honor societies Beta Phi Mu and Chi Sigma Iota. As a member of Chi Sigma Iota, Favreau became an academic coordinator for the organization at North Carolina A&T State University, and as a senior administrator helped in the creation of the Counselor's Bookshelf, as well as contributed as one of its first editors.

== Career ==
Favreau was known for her one-panel comics, ranging from light-hearted jokes to more politically focused events. Many of her works were published in newspapers and magazines such as Funny Times, Nerve, and Factsheet Five. She drew over one-hundred comics during her career.

E-String focused on a variety of topics in America and was featured in many newspapers across the country. In the So It Goes... series, she brought up the issue of LGBT stereotypes to comment on how straight, and usually white people, treated the community. The Breakup and The Tourists were comics that focused on lesbianism, but were not a part of the series. These comics showed the vast spectrum of Favreau's comedic creativity while also bringing awareness of stereotypes about lesbians. Later on, Favreau moved from LGBT-focused comics to ones that dealt with a wide-range of topics and humor.

Favreau taught a Cartooning 101 course at UNCG's All Arts, Sciences, and Technology Camp, and also worked as a library manager at the Central North Carolina Regional Library system.

During a time of spiritual journey, she published Ridiculous Packaging: Or, My Long, Strange Journey from Atheist to Episcopalian, In Two Acts in 2005. She became more active in her religious community and wrote many sermons, her most famous being A Sermon on Faith (2007). Favreau was a guest speaker at several religious events.

== Personal life ==
Favreau was openly lesbian and lived with her partner, Beth Bealle, in Winston-Salem, North Carolina. In October 2009, she was diagnosed with Stage III ovarian cancer. In 2010, with a hope to influence people through her art and spirituality, she created Last Cartoonist Sitting, a blog holding all of her works.

== Death ==
Karen Favreau, aged 41, died from ovarian cancer on July 7, 2010 in Winston-Salem.

== See also ==
- Female comics creators
- List of female comics creators
