= Hozumi =

Hozumi (written: 穂積) is both a Japanese surname and a masculine Japanese given name. Notable people with the name include:

== Surname ==
- Prince Hozumi (穂積親王; died 715), Japanese prince, the fifth son of Emperor Tenmu
- Eri Hozumi (穂積 絵莉; born 1994), Japanese tennis player
- Masako Hozumi (穂積 雅子; born 1986), Japanese speed skater
- Mihoko Hozumi (穂積 美保子; born 1955), Japanese handball player
- Nobushige Hozumi (穂積 陳重; 1856–1926), Japanese lawyer
- Ryo Hozumi (穂積 諒; born 1994), Japanese footballer
- Takanobu Hozumi (穂積 隆信; born 1931), Japanese actor and voice actor
- Toyohiko Hozumi (穂積 豊彦; born 1952), Japanese handball player
- Utako Hozumi (穂積詩子; born 1968), Japanese professional wrestler
- Yatsuka Hozumi (穂積 八束; 1860–1912), Japanese political scientist
- Yasuo Hozumi (穂積 八洲雄; born 1936), Japanese sailor
- Yuya Hozumi (保住 有哉; born 1993), Japanese voice actor and singer

== Given name ==
- Hozumi Gōda (郷田 ほづみ; born 1957), Japanese voice actor, narrator and sound director
- Hozumi Hasegawa (長谷川 穂積; born 1980), Japanese boxer
- Hozumi Moriyama (森山 秀実; born 1967), Japanese speed skater

== See also ==
- Hozumi Station, a railway station in Mizuho, Gifu Prefecture, Japan
