= Oksi =

Graphic novel

- Cover art for original edition of Oksi
- Author: Mari Ahokoivu
- Illustrator: Mari Ahokoivu
- Cover artist: Mari Ahokoivu (original); Jonathan Yamakami (English translation)
- Language: Finnish
- Genre: Young adult novel
- Published: August 2018; October 26, 2021 (English translation)
- Publisher: Levine Querido
- Publication place: Finland
- Media type: Print (hardcover)
- Pages: 376 (original); 400 (English translation)
- ISBN: 978-1-64614-113-5 (English translation, hardcover edition)

Oksi (Finnish for bear) is a graphic novel written and illustrated by Mari Ahokoivu. Originally released in Finnish and published by Asema Kustannus in August 2018, the novel was translated into English by Silja-Maaria Aronpuro and published by Levine Querido on October 26, 2021.

== Development and publication ==
Adapting story elements from Finnish folklore and mixing in aspects of sci-fi, Oksi is a fantasy novel following Umi, a mother bear. Mari Ahokoivu, a Finnish comics creator, both wrote and illustrated the novel. She worked on Oksi for about five years prior to its release in 2018. The novel received support from the North Ostrobothnia Regional Fund of Finnish Cultural Foundation during its development.

The book was originally written in Finnish and published by Asema Kustannus in August 2018. This version included English subtitles.

The world English rights for Oksi were purchased by Nick Thomas of the publisher Levine Querido. An English translation by Silja-Maaria Aronpuro was published on October 26, 2021. Jonathan Yamakami was the cover design artist for the English translation edition.

== Style and themes ==
Digital art constitutes the novel's visual component, as does a mixture of ink and watercolor art. Ahokoivu uses a mainly black-and-white color palette in Oksi, with grays commonplace throughout; splashes of color are also present, though less commonly. Borderless panels are also used in Oksi.

Oksi has been cited by book reviewers to have a parent–child dynamic present in its themes, similar to the folklore it is based upon. The world in the graphic novel is primarily populated by non-human animals and spiritual entities.

== Reception ==
Arpad Okay of ComicsBeat wrote positively of Oksi, opining that "Stormy charcoal wash has all the bare power of black and white comic art, but within character and landscape Ahokoivu achieves layers of murk, smoke, and shadow. There aren't a lot of other artists doing this kind of genre conflation — Zao Dao, Emily Carroll — and no one doing it like Oksi is." Okay also wrote that Ahokoivu and Aronpuro "created a book that I've read more than once but still not enough to definitively put words to what it means to me, adding that the book is as "beautiful as it is gutting."

Kirkus Reviews also offered positive commentary on Oksi, calling it "visually powerful and emotionally compelling," and adding that "the storyline meanders whimsically but then quickly shocks with its sudden eruptions of violence, a stark reminder of the harshness of the natural world and the powerful universality of wanting to belong." Hillary Brown of The Comics Journal wrote that Ahokoivu's use of watercolor "with its gradations and sense of being difficult to control, is a good choice" for Oksi, aptly suggesting instability. Touching on the parent–child dynamic, Brown wrote that "There's something Promethean at work here, with humans receiving the gift of fire only to turn it to violence, and Ahokoivu renders that flickering, fascinating substance repeatedly with an awareness of its transformative power."

April Spisak offered a positive review of the graphic novel for The Bulletin of the Center for Children's Books, commending the novel's themes and artwork, stating that both graphic novel and folklore fans "will likely find [Oksi] deeply satisfying and memorable." Spisak opined that Oksi "is a breathtaking exploration of generational connection," and added that its "digital art is ethereal, with curvy lines and dreamy forest scenes, while the palette is mostly black-and-white, making the spare use of rich, radiant colors all the more arresting."

== Accolades ==
Oksi was a nominee for the Sarjakuva-Finlandia prize in 2018, as well as the HelMet Award in 2019, and the Jarkko Laine Award in 2020. The novel was selected as a Booklist Editors' Choice among books for youth in 2021. It was also named a Bulletin Blue Ribbon book in 2021.
