= Forget Sorrow =

First edition (publ. W. W. Norton)

Forget Sorrow: An Ancestral Tale is a 2010 biographical comic book by Belle Yang. It is a memoir about her relatives' experiences in China in the mid-20th century.

== Plot ==
The book initially takes place in the modern day, when Yang, an aspiring artist, who had recently graduated from university, goes to her parents' residence in Carmel, California, to escape a former boyfriend and stalker she names "Rotten Egg". Her father, Zu-Wu Joseph Yang, tells her about the life of her grandfather in mainland China and how the family was affected by the Second Sino-Japanese War/World War II as well as the Chinese Civil War and subsequent establishment of the People's Republic of China. Her grandfather fought in the first conflict while in Manchuria. Ryan Holmberg of Yishu: Journal of Contemporary Chinese Art stated that the author "is predictably and entirely unsympathetic to the Communists."

The story alternates between the past and the present day. Holmberg described it as "symptomatically a book without a present tense" as Yang only briefly lived in Asia.

== Background ==
Yang initially wanted to write a narrative with occasional pictures in color. The book was rejected by publishers several times and her agent became no longer willing to promote the book; another agent suggested to her that she should make it a comic book instead. As part of the publication process Yang rewrote the work several times. There was a fourteen-year gap between the conception of the idea and the publication of the final product.

== Art style ==
Holmberg stated that her art style as "a flat, naïve, semi-folkish mode so common in literary comics memoirs since the success of French artists Satrapi and David B." The artwork has references to King Lear and The Scream.

== Reception ==
Meredith May of the San Francisco Chronicle stated that "Yang's ancestral story is earning strong praise for its epic yet intimate account of one family's hardships in 20th century China."

Publishers Weekly stated it was "a riveting true-life tale of ancestral jealousies and familial woes from her father's recollections of growing up in China."

Kirkus Reviews stated that the book is "A transformational experience for author and reader alike."
