= Moderna de Pueblo =

Spanish comic writer and illustrator (born 1986)

Raquel Córcoles
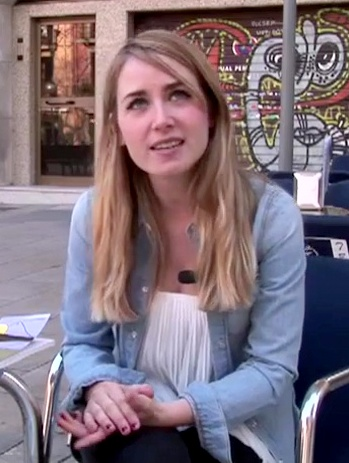
- Born: 31 December 1986 (age 39); Reus, Tarragona, Spain
- Occupations: Comic writer and illustrator

Raquel Córcoles (born December 31, 1986), better known as Moderna de Pueblo, is a Spanish illustrator and author of comics.

== Biography ==
Corcoles studied advertising, journalism and audiovisual communication at Rovira i Virgili University in Tarragona and has a degree in journalism from King Juan Carlos University in Madrid. She has been editor of InformativosTelecinco.com in charge of economic information. Corcoles started as a comic book illustrator in August 2011 in the magazine El Jueves, where she published a weekly comic page, and that same year she began to publish a weekly comic strip in the Cuore magazine. She also collaborates with other media such as GQ magazine and the newspaper El País.

== Moderna de Pueblo ==
The name of Moderna de Pueblo ("Modern Villager") comes from a character created in 2010 in her blog. This character became a viral phenomenon with more than 200,000 followers on Facebook. Her comics are about a twenty-year-old blonde girl who always wears sunglasses and who moves out of town to succeed in the city. There are other characters stereotypical of urban culture, such as women with everyday problems, frustrated young people, interns and hipsters.

== Bibliography ==
Book	Year	Pages	Publisher	ISBN
Soy de Pueblo	2012	128	LUMEN	9788499471778
Los capullos no regalan flores	2013	160	LUMEN	9788426421371
El Cooltureta	2014	128	LUMEN	9788426400246
Idiotizadas: de cuentos de hadas a empoderhadas	2017	208	PLANETA	9788408176886
Coñodramas	2020	312	ZENITH	9788408233459
