= Ryo Hozumi =

Japanese footballer

Personal information
- Date of birth: 30 May 1994 (age 32)
- Place of birth: Chiba, Japan
- Height: 1.81 m (5 ft 11 in)
- Position: Defender

Team information
- Current team: Veertien Mie
- Number: 3

Youth career
- Katsuragi FC
- FC Larque Vale Chiba
- Chiba Meitoku HS
- 2013–2016: Takushoku University

Senior career*
Years	Team	Apps	(Gls)
2017–2020	Vanraure Hachinohe	93	(5)
2021–	Veertien Mie	14	(0)
- * Club domestic league appearances and goals as of 17:04, 13 July 2021 (UTC)

Ryo Hozumi (穂積 諒, Hozumi Ryo; born 30 May 1994) is a Japanese footballer currently playing as a defender for Veertien Mie.

== Career statistics ==
=== Club ===
As of 13 July 2021.

Club	Season	League			National Cup		League Cup		Other		Total	
Club	Season	Division	Apps	Goals	Apps	Goals	Apps	Goals	Apps	Goals	Apps	Goals
Vanraure Hachinohe	2017	JFL	30	2	3 (Note: Appearances in the Emperor's Cup)	0	–		0	0	33	2
Vanraure Hachinohe	2018	JFL	25	3	0	0	–		0	0	25	3
Vanraure Hachinohe	2019	J3 League	18	0	2	0	–		0	0	20	0
Vanraure Hachinohe	2020	J3 League	20	0	0	0	–		0	0	20	0
Vanraure Hachinohe	Total		93	5	5	0	0	0	0	0	98	5
Veertien Mie	2021	JFL	14	0	0	0	–		0	0	14	0
Career total			107	5	5	0	0	0	0	0	112	5
