= Goofus and Gallant =

American children's comic strip

- Goofus and Gallant from the October 1980 issue of Highlights for Children
- Author: Garry Cleveland Myers (original)
- Illustrator: Leslie Harrington (current)
- Current status/schedule: Running/monthly
- Launch date: 1940
- Publishers: Highlights for Children (1946–present); Children's Activities (1940–1946)
- Genre: Educational comics

Goofus and Gallant is an American children's comic strip created by Garry Cleveland Myers. The strip is designed to teach social etiquette by using a simple two-panel, side-by-side comparison. Goofus demonstrates rude, selfish, and careless behavior on the left, while Gallant demonstrates polite, kind, and considerate actions on the right.

First published in Children's Activities in 1940, Goofus and Gallant moved to Highlights for Children when the magazine was founded in 1946, and has appeared there ever since. Educators and researchers have often used the comic to help children identify ethical and unethical behavior, and philosophers have often referenced Goofus and Gallant as personifications of vice and virtue, respectively.

== History ==
Goofus and Gallant was created by Garry Cleveland Myers and was first featured in the magazine Children's Activities in 1940. According to family legend, the grandchildren of Myers and his wife Caroline, Kent Brown and Garry Cleveland Myers III, inspired the characters Goofus and Gallant respectively. At first, the comic's characters were depicted as elves. In 1946, when the Myerses founded Highlights for Children, they brought Goofus and Gallant with them to the new magazine. By the 1950s, the strip's art style changed and Goofus and Gallant turned from elves to human boys.

Throughout Goofus and Gallant's history, numerous artists have drawn for the strip. The first was Maurieta Wellman who drew the strip until 1952. She was succeeded by Marion Hull Hammel who had the strip's longest tenure as illustrator, working for 32 years until 1984. Sidney Quinn, who since 1977 had already been illustrating The Timbertoes, another Highlights feature, took over the art on Goofus and Gallant from Hammel and drew the strip for a decade until his death in 1994. Kit Wray illustrated the comic for a year in 1995 until Anni Matsick took over from 1996 through 2005. Since 2006, Goofus and Gallant has been illustrated by Leslie Harrington.

For many years, a short line of text reading "Gallant shows correct behavior" was included at the bottom of the comic. The strip's protagonists have varied in age and appearance over time, variously shown with long or short, or dark or light hair and aged twelve or eight or five years old. Goofus and Gallant have never appeared in the same panel of the comic.

According to Brown, who was editor of Highlights for Children, "Without Goofus, Gallant would be bland and no one would pay attention. But kids see parts of themselves in both characters. No one is as good as Gallant, and no one is as bad as Goofus. But being more like Gallant is something to strive for." By the 2020s, the comic included a line echoing this sentiment at the top of each installment: "There's some of Goofus and Gallant in us all. When the Gallant shines through, we show our best self."

Goofus and Gallant has reflected shifts in American parenting styles and attitudes about how children (especially boys) ought to behave. While strips from the 1950s highlighted Goofus crying in pain and Gallant suppressing tears, strips from 2000 onward showed Goofus ignoring or reacting badly to hurts while Gallant expressed his emotions more openly to himself and others. Older installments of the comic also reflected a greater degree of autonomy for both Goofus and Gallant to explore unsupervised, while comics from 2000 onward rarely showed either child outdoors unsupervised by an adult.

== Reception ==
The children's author and philosophy professor Claudia Mills wrote that Goofus and Gallant is heavily didactic but is nonetheless effective at imparting its lessons to children. According to author and professor of literature and pop culture Harold Schechter, "though Goofus is clearly meant to be obnoxious, even destructive–a bundle of unbridled aggression–he generally seems more appealing than the do-gooder Gallant", which Schechter believed necessitated the explanatory caption below each strip to confirm which character children should be emulating. Donald Kaul writing in The Des Moines Register described Gallant as "an awful prig" and wrote that while the children he observed reading Goofus and Gallant "continue to exhibit an average amount of Goofus behavior, [they] always identify completely with Gallant, the goody-goody. They jeer at Goofus's shortcomings and pat themselves on the back whenever Gallant turns himself in to do an onerous chore like taking music lessons." Alan A. Block wrote that Goofus and Gallant presents uncritical assumptions about what constitutes right and wrong, and rarely or never interfaces with situations of real-world prejudice.

== Other uses ==
Goofus and Gallant strips have been used for research purposes. A 2006 study gauging the development of ideas of respect and disrespect among American children used strips from the comic as stimuli to which the subjects could provide qualitative responses regarding why they believed Goofus's or Gallant's actions were respectful or disrespectful. A 2012 study used the strips to prompt autistic and non-autistic children to identify whether the depicted child (either Goofus or Gallant) was behaving badly while researchers used an fMRI to measure the neural networks used in reaching their conclusions.

The concepts of Goofus and Gallant have also appeared in contexts divorced from the comic. Philosopher Theodore Sider used the characters in an argument against the notion of a binary heaven or hell conception of the afterlife. Sider conceived of Goofus and Gallant as near-equals, with Gallant only marginally better than Goofus, in arguing that sending the former to heaven and the latter to hell is antithetical to God's justice. Other philosophers such as Matthew Konieczka and Casey Swank have also called upon Goofus and Gallant as archetypes of bad and good when formulating arguments.
