= Minna Sundberg =

Finnish illustrator and cartoonist (born 1990)

Minna Sundberg (born 9 January 1990) is a Finnish illustrator and cartoonist. She is known for the webcomics A Redtail's Dream (aRTD), and Stand Still, Stay Silent (SS, SS).

== Biography ==
Minna Sundberg was born in Sweden in 1990 into a Finnish immigrant family which returned to Finland in 1997. She obtained a bachelor's degree from the University of Art and Design Helsinki, Finland, Graphic Design department. At age 25, and as the first Finn, she won a Reuben Award in the category Online Comics – Long Form.

== Career ==
During her first year in university, planning to make a career as a webcomic artist, she made several attempts to start a "practice comic", the last of which evolved into A Redtail's Dream (aRTD). A Redtail's Dream became a 556-page tale built around concepts from Finnish mythology. Her following project was Stand Still, Stay Silent about an imaginary post-apocalyptic world set 90 years into the future. The supplementary info page on "Language Families" from Stand Still, Stay Silent showing Indo-European and Uralic families was published as a poster and gained popularity outside of comics fandom, earning praise by linguists. Sundberg's work was cited as a representative example of the maturing genre of webcomics, while her style was called "perfectly assured" and "awe-inspiring". She also worked as illustrator, including cover art, for several publications.

In March 2021, Sundberg released a short comic called Lovely People, about bunnies living in a social credit system, and revealed that she had converted to Christianity. On 28 March 2022 the last page of Stand Still, Stay Silent was released, ending the webcomic. On 31 October 2022 she published A Meandering Line, a short comic detailing her conversion to Christianity and beginning on 13 January 2023 Journey Upstream which she calls an overtly Christian comic, about a traveling group of animals.

== Religion ==
In A Meandering Line, Sundberg writes that she is a Calvinist and was interested in monergistic churches (such as Reformed Baptist, Presbyterian and Lutheran) shortly after her conversion to Christianity. She ended up joining a Reformed Baptist church in Finland.

== Selected works ==
- Sundberg, Minna: A Redtail's Dream, s. 608. Author's Edition, 2014. ISBN 978-91-637-4627-7
- Sundberg, Minna: Stand Still Stay Silent Book 1, s. 324. Author's Edition, 2015. ISSN 2342-8880 (print) ISSN 2342-8899 (online).
- Sundberg, Minna: Stand Still Stay Silent Book 2, s. 260. Hiveworks Comics, 2018. ISBN 978-1-9466-9806-3
- Sundberg, Minna: Stand Still Stay Silent Book 3, s. 304. Hiveworks Comics, 2020. ISSN 2342-8880 (printed book), ISSN 2342-8899 (online).
- Sundberg, Minna: Un Réve de Renard, s. 600. Édition Akileos, 2019. ISBN 978-2-35574-455-6
- Sundberg, Minna: Stand Still Stay Silent Livre 1, s. 328. Édition Akileos, 2018. ISBN 978-2-35574-353-5
- Sundberg, Minna: Stand Still Stay Silent Livre 2, s. 260. Édition Akileos, 2019. ISBN 978-2-35574-363-4
- Sundberg, Minna: Stand Still Stay Silent Livre 3. s. 304. Édition Akileos, 2020. ISBN 978-2-35574-453-2
- Sundberg, Minna: Lovely People, s. 80. Author's Edition, 2021. ISBN 978-952-94-4704-6
- Illustrations for Dragon Art. Inspiration, Impact & Technique in Fantasy Art (2009) ISBN 978-1-4351-1771-6
- Cover art for Foxhunt (2009) ISBN 978-0-578-02605-3
- Cover art for Syvyyksien valtias Original title Storlax The power of the deep (2010) ISBN 978-952-230-106-2
- Cover art for Crossed Genres Quarterly 4 (2011) ISBN 978-0-615-57863-7
- CD cover art for music band The Winter Tree (2011)
- Cover art for Legazy (2013) ISBN 978-1-908600-22-6
- Cover art for Australian series of children fantasy Zarkora books. (2015)

== Awards ==
- 2015 Reuben Award by the National Cartoonists Society in the category of 'Online Comics – Long Form' for Stand Still. Stay Silent.
