= Flavita Banana =

Spanish comic artist (born 1987)

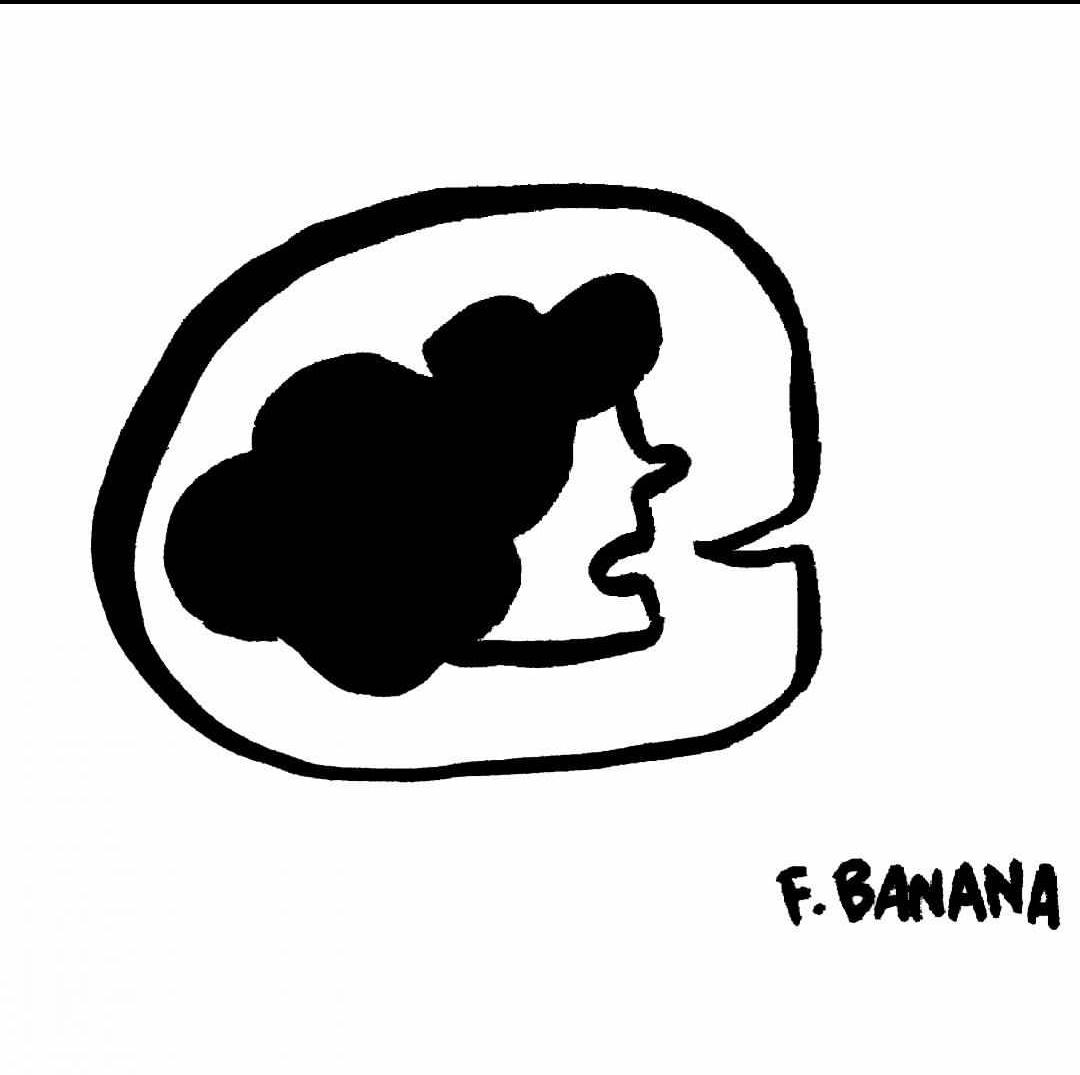
- Born: 1987 (age 38–39); Oviedo, Spain
- Occupations: Comic writer and illustrator

Flavia Álvarez-Pedrosa Pruvost, better known as Flavita Banana (Oviedo, 1987), is a Spanish illustrator and cartoonist.

== Biography ==
She studied Art and Design at the Escola Massana school.

She has collaborated weekly with SModa magazine and monthly with: Orgullo y satisfacción, El Salto and Mongolia. In 2018 she began collaborating with El País, La maleta de portbou and Jodtown.

Her cartoons are usually about love and relationships, although in her latest publications, she covers other social issues. With an acid, cynical flavor, a great sense of humor and a great load of sentimentality, Flavita exposes controversial everyday situations.

== Work ==
- Curvy (Lumen, 2016).
- Las cosas del querer (Lumen, 2017).
- Archivos estelares (¡Caramba!, Astiberri Ediciones, 2017).
- Archivos cósmicos (¡Caramba!, Astiberri Ediciones, 2019).
