= Jess Fink =

American comic book creator

Jess Fink is an American comic book creator.

== Early life and education ==
In high school, Jess Fink began reading comics and then manga. She cites Molly Kiely and Art Spiegelman as influences.

In 2003, Fink received her degree in Illustrating & Cartooning from the School of Visual Arts in New York City. During her studies, she was taught by Tom Hart, who assisted her with editing We Can Fix It.

== Career ==
She created the webcomic turned graphic novel Chester 5000 XYV and graphic novel We Can Fix It, both published by Top Shelf Comics. Her work has appeared in North American Review among other publications. Fink's erotic comic book work has been featured at the Museum of Sex in New York City and on the Oh Joy Sex Toy web comic and book. Her is autobiographical in nature and features erotic scenes. For example, she described her work, We Can Fix It as "an autobiographical memoir... with a time machine" and has described her work Chester 5000 XYV as "an erotic, robotic, Victorian romance."

== Awards and recognition ==
Chester 5000 XYV is part of the Library of Congress's Webcomics Web Archive.

== Personal life ==
She currently lives in Troy, New York and sells jewelry through an online store named Hey Chickadee! She has used Kickstarter to fund projects and has a Patreon.

== Bibliography ==
=== Top Shelf Comics ===
- Chester 5000 XYV (2011)
- We Can Fix It (2013)

=== Image Comics ===
- Adventures Into Mindless Self Indulgence (2010)

=== Webcomics ===
- Chester 5000
- Kid With Experience
- We Are Become Pals

=== Anthologies ===
- SPX (2002/2003)
- Best Erotic Comics (Last Gasp, 2009)
- Erotic Comics, Volume 2 (Abrams, 2008)
- Popgun (Volume 4, 2010)
- Smut Peddler (2013)

== Awards ==
- 2017 Ignatz Award for Outstanding Series - Chester 5000
