= Molly Kiely =

Canadian-American alternative cartoonist (born 1969)

- Born: Molly Maud Kiely; October 10, 1969 (age 57) Bracebridge, Ontario, Canada
- Area: Cartoonist
- Notable works: Eros Comix titles

Molly Maud Kiely (born October 10, 1969) is a Canadian-American alternative cartoonist best known for erotica. Her work is published by Fantagraphics/Eros Comix and has influenced other artists such as Jess Fink.

Kiely was born in Bracebridge, Ontario, raised in Kitchener, and attended the University of Waterloo. She has liked drawing her whole life, and discovered comics through Krazy Kat and Li'l Abner. She created her first minicomic in 1991 at San Diego Comic-Con. She left Canada for San Francisco in 1992.

Her first comic, Communion, was a collaboration with J. Hagey based on a stream-of-consciousness poem about a one-night stand. It was published by the Eros Comix imprint of Fantagraphics in 1992. In 1993, Wooley Comics commissioned her to do a comic adaptation of Marquis de Sade's novel Philosophy in the Bedroom.

She describes her work as "clean line style" that has been compared to Aubrey Beardsley and Jaime Hernandez.

The pornographic nature of her work sometimes draws judgement from feminists who see her as helping men exploit women. Under Subsection 163 of the Canadian Criminal Code, the Canadian Customs and Post Office occasionally confiscated Kiely's work when it was being mailed between her and Eros in 1995.

She had a daughter with her husband in 2007 before being widowed in 2015. As of 2017, Kiely resides in Tucson, Arizona with her daughter.

== Selected bibliography ==
- Communion, 1992 (written by Jonathan Hagey)
- Philosophy in the Bedroom, 1993
- Diary of a Dominatrix, 3 volumes, 1994–1995
- Sass, 1995
- Saucy Little Tart, 5 volumes, 1995–1997
- That Kind of Girl, 1999
- Tecopa Jane, 2000
- On Your Knees Boy, 2002
- Adaptation of Murasaki Shikibu's The Tale of Genji in the anthology The Graphic Cannon, edited by Russ Kick
