= Sorcerers & Secretaries =

Comic by Amy Kim Ganter

Sorcerers & Secretaries is an original English-language manga created by Amy Kim Ganter and was published by Tokyopop. It blends fantasy elements with romance, centering on a young aspiring writer named Nicole Hayes who daydreams about sorcery while working as a receptionist and attending business college.
