= Zolzaya Batkhuyag =

Mongolian writer

Zolzaya Bakthuyag
- Батхуягийн Золзаяа
- Born: Zolzaya Batkhuyag; Ulaanbaatar

Zolzaya Batkhuyag (sometimes Zola Batkhuyag or Bakthuyag) is a lawyer, social activist and artist. She co-founded Women for Change with three other female lawyers including Anudari Ayush, Nomingerel Khuyag and Tegshzaya Jalan-Aajav, an NGO in Mongolia. As part of their work, they created a comic book series which communicates ideas about feminism by using comic book characters to mimic experiences from their own lives. Topics include the importance of participating in elections, how to have sex that is consensual, and how to protect oneself from domestic violence.

Zolzaya Batkhuyag co-founded the Women for Change NGO. She became an Asia Foundation Development Fellow in 2015. She produced an adaption of the Vagina Monologues from 2011–2013 in Ulaanbaatar, Mongolia and spoke at the Ulaanbaatar TEDx in 2013.

== Biography ==
Zolzaya Batkhuyag Zolzaya Batkhuyag is a Director and Co-Founder of the Women for Change (WFC) NGO. Since 2008, she has been a gender-justice activist and led numerous advocacy projects that have raised public awareness and built community efforts for justice. Currently, she is studying for Master of Development Studies at the University of Melbourne.

Ms Zolzaya has worked at the grassroots level for many years fighting for gender equality and women's empowerment. From 2011 to 2013, she successfully produced The Vagina Monologues in Mongolia with Women for Change, the feminist play by Eve Ensler. This was part of V-Day, a global movement to combat violence against women and girls. She co-initiated and has led the annual Professional Women's Leadership Program since 2015. Also, she serves as a board member of the Mongolian Women's Fund and The Alumni Association of Professional Women's Leadership Program. She also led Independent (civil society) observation of Voting and Vote counting process of National Election in 2012, 2016 and 2017 (Parliamentarian and Presidential Election) with support of Open Society Forum Mongolia.

Ms Zolzaya is active in the media and frequently shares her expertise through speaking engagements on gender equality and youth development including TEDx Talks (TEDWomenUlaanbaatar and TED BagaToiruu) in 2013 and 2016.

Batkhuyag was a fellow in Georgia, US at the Siegel Institute at Kennesaw State University. She then traveled to Mongolia to develop program and support groups for Mongolian women.

== Women for Change NGO ==
Women for Change is a membership-based NGO located in Ulaanbaatar, Mongolia. It founded in 2010 by four Mongolian women including Zolzaya Batkhuyag, Anudari Ayush, Nomingerel Khuyag and Tegshzaya Jalan-Aajav, who shared a passion for the promotion of gender equality, human rights and democracy – values which continue to underpin our work today. The goal of Women for Change is to support, empower and advocate for women and young people in Mongolia. Women for Change believe in the power of social change, and in encouraging personal development through increasing awareness of gender discrimination, and supporting women in their quest for knowledge, self-confidence and self-determination.
