= Amy Kim Kibuishi =

American author and illustrator

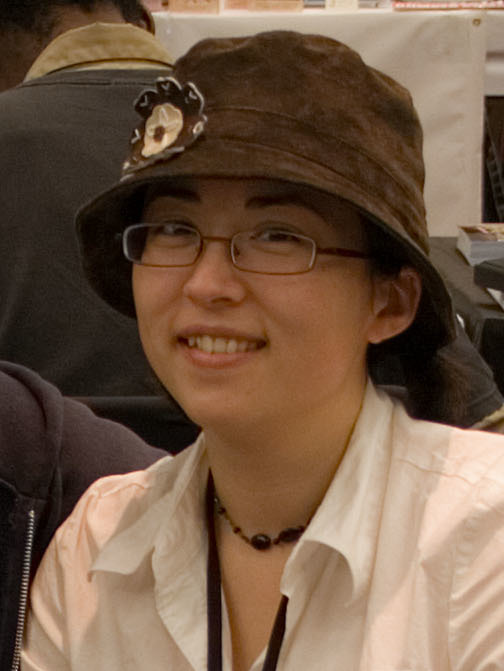
- Amy Kim Kibuishi in 2006
- Born: Amy Kim Ganter; 1980 (age 45–46) Binghamton, New York
- Areas: Writer, Artist

Amy Kim Kibuishi (née Ganter) (born 1980 in Binghamton, New York), is an American author and illustrator of original English-language manga.

== Career ==
Kibuishi is a winner in the fourth Rising Stars of Manga competition, winning the third-place prize of $1,000 and a trophy for her story The Hopeless Romantic and the Hapless Girl. In 2005, Kibuishi created the character designs and comic art for the original Diner Dash video game by Gamelab. She later authored Tokyopop's Sorcerers & Secretaries, the story of Josh, a "bad boy," who falls for Nicole, a university student and part-time secretary who writes the story of the sorcerer Ellon in her dream journal.

Kibuishi is also a contributor to the second and fourth volumes of the Flight series of comics anthologies, telling Food from the Sea a "manga-derived tale of an epic clash between a fish seller and a clam seller" in volume 4. She has adapted the R.L. Stine Goosebumps novella, Deep Trouble, for the graphic novel Terror Trips. Terror Trips also has stories illustrated by Jill Thompson and Jamie Tolagson. She is also the creator of the defunct webcomic Reman Mythology.

By 2007, Kibuishi had stopped creating manga and webcomics to focus on her new family, describing herself as a "former cartoonist" on her blog. This changed when she announced the launch of her new graphic novel The Rema Chronicles in July 2021. It is scheduled to be published by Scholastic Graphix in 2022.

== Influences ==
Kibuishi says that after out-growing superhero comics like Spawn and X-Men, she became influenced by the more realistic comics she discovered while on a childhood trip to Korea. She cites Japanese manga series Ranma ½ as an influence.

== Personal life ==
Kibuishi is married to comics artist Kazu Kibuishi. They reside in Bellevue, Washington and have two children together. Kibuishi told the story of her "third first kiss" with her future husband for the book First Kiss (Then Tell).
