= Sharon Alston =

New Zealand cartoonist, designer, artist and illustrator (1948–1995)

Sharon Alston (13 March 1948 - 11 February 1995) was a New Zealand artist and lesbian feminist. She is most known for illustrating covers, posters, flyers, and comics for the New Zealand feminist magazine Broadsheet. Alston was also a leading member of the Women's Art Collective in Auckland and an early member of Auckland's Gay Liberation Front.

Alston's watercolor piece My Bloody Hand (1979) was included in A Women's Picture Book (1988), which compiled the works of 25 female artists from New Zealand. Alston's art installations Frolicking in the Valleys of Death and Ironical Journey were exhibited in the 1981 New Zealand Women's Gallery.

== Artistic career and works ==
Sharon Alston worked at the magazine Broadsheet, a monthly feminist magazine founded by four women, Anne Else, Sandra Coney, Rosemary Ronald, and Kitty Wishart in 1972. She would work at Broadsheet from 1973 until the early 1990s, designing the magazine covers, providing illustrations for articles, making comic strips, and creating various posters and flyers.

Alston's most famous piece was My Bloody Hand, a watercolor painting produced in 1979 about the processes of menstruation and lesbian sex. This work, which aimed to make menstruation and lesbian sexuality more visible, was featured in A Women's Picture Book, a 1988 collection of feminist women's art. She used the metaphor of a bloody hand to explore the sensual and emotional qualities of lesbian identity, confronting aspects of New Zealand culture which enforced safe, hetero-normative ideals. My Bloody Hand was included in the book despite pushback from anthropologist and writer Irihapeti Ramsden as well as other female Māori contributors due to the piece's potential breaking of tapu.

Some of Alston's other works included the installations Frolicking in the Valleys of Death and Ironical Journey, which were exhibited in the 1981 Women's Gallery in New Zealand. These focused on themes separate from her identity as a lesbian artist. Frolicking in the Valleys of Death depicted sheep in patterns on fields of grass and across the New Zealand flag, while Ironical Journey was a quickly assembled structure composed of iron. While Frolicking in the Valleys of Death was received as a commentary on the days in which the New Zealand flag is officially flown by the government, Ironical Journey was a more unserious piece, built for the sole purpose of being destroyed.

== Activism ==
Alston made significant contributions to feminist activist movements in New Zealand. She was among the first people to sign up for Auckland's Gay Liberation Front, an activist movement started in 1972 to advocate for gay and lesbian rights in New Zealand. The movement was inspired by the young lesbian student Ngahuia Te Awekotuku, who mobilized a crowd of 40 people to declare the beginning of their movement in front of the press.

In a 1973 speech before a delegation of women's liberation members, Alston openly announced she was a lesbian and advocated for the rights of lesbians worldwide. This speech would be published in the June issue of Broadsheet later that year, within a section labelled 'Gay Pride.' In 1976, Alston advocated for women's bodily autonomy when dealing with issues surrounding abortion.

== Personal life ==
Alston came out in her teens as a lesbian to supportive parents. However, she spent a large portion of her early life in the closet to others outside of her family. Despite being part of Auckland's Gay Liberation Front, most of her work did not engage with her lesbian identity. Her most famous work My Bloody Hand was an outlier, which aimed to explore her lesbian sexuality. Alston found a life partner in Robbie Champtaloup. Alston was diagnosed with breast cancer at age 45 in 1994 and passed away in early 1995. At the end of her life, Alston felt she was not as well known as she would have liked.

== Legacy and influence ==
Sharon Alston's legacy and influence has not been widely recognized in the history of lesbian and feminist art. Marian Evans, a fellow activist and artist, observed that Alston had "not accomplished all that she had hoped for." Aorewa McLeod, who wrote Alston's obituary, recalled that in her final farewell to her friends Alston stated, "I have not honoured my creativity," indicating her regret that she had run out of time and no longer had the opportunity to become the "famous painter" she had hoped to be. Recognition of her work has remained outside mainstream art narratives of her time and is found solely within New Zealand, partly due to historical patterns of erasure and uneven documentation in lesbian and feminist art archiving at that time. Her work nonetheless left an impact on the lesbian community in New Zealand, as many of her peers remembered her as compassionate, funny, and stylish.

Alston has also been acknowledged by a number of scholars of 1970s feminist art in New Zealand. Anne Kirker's book New Zealand Women Artists: A Survey of 150 Years, lists Alston amongst the women who contributed to the development of feminist artistic practices in New Zealand, crediting her for her role in shaping women-centered creative spaces. Other scholars similarly note her significance to the history of lesbian and feminist art collectives in New Zealand.

Alston's involvement as a graphics contributor to the Broadsheet magazine and the Women's Gallery aligns with what Sydney J. Shep, an academic in book history and print culture, describes as "shifting agency", which is a concept describing the giving of power and the ability to define oneself back to the people who have been historically denied it. Alston promoted her feminist ideals through the platforms of publishing and as a creator of visual media. She helped create opportunities and an infrastructure for other women and lesbians to produce and share their artwork.

Alston's legacy, therefore, is increasingly understood through the relational and cultural networks she personally sustained and expanded before her death.
