= Riham El-Hour =

Moroccan cartoonist (born 1977)

- ريهام الحر
- Born: March 8, 1977 (age 49)
- Education: BA in Arabic Literature, Faculty of Letters, Kenitra
- Alma mater: Faculty of Letters (Kenitra)
- Known for: Cartooning, political cartoons, women's-rights advocacy
- Notable work: Named one of BBC's 100 Women (2016); first woman member of the Union of Moroccan Professional Caricaturists; UNESCO Palestine Prize (2000)
- Style: Satirical political cartoons; caricature
- Movement: Contemporary cartooning; activist art
- Awards: UNESCO Palestine Prize (2000); Prizes at Damascus caricature exhibitions (2005–2006); BBC 100 Women (2016)

Riham El-Hour (Arabic: ريهام الحر; born March 8, 1977) is a Moroccan cartoonist who was the first woman to join the Union of Moroccan Professional Caricaturists. She uses her cartoons to advocate for women's rights and against male guardianship laws and was named one of the BBC's 100 women of 2016.

== Early life and education ==
She studied Arabic literature at the Faculty of Letters in Kenitra, Morocco. In 2000, she won a competition organized by the United Nations Educational, Scientific and Cultural Organization (UNESCO) for the protection of cultural heritage. She published in the Moroccan newspapers Al Alam, Al Mintaka, the women's press Citadines and Likoli Nissae, and in the Casablanca newspaper Rissalat Al Ouma.

== Work ==
In 2000, El-Hour won UNESCO's Palestine Prize in an international competition. Two years later, she participated in the national days of Moroccan caricature as the first woman caricaturist of Morocco. She received a prize at the caricatures exhibitions in Damascus, Syria in 2005/2006 and in the following year, she represented Morocco at the Santomera exhibition in Spain.

Her first drawings were published in Al Alam, a Moroccan Arabic language newspaper, and in Al Mintaka, a local Kenitra newspaper. She also drew for the women's magazine Citadines. Starting 2006, she worked for different national and international newspapers and from October 2011, she started to work with the Arabic version of Likolli Nissae and later she went to work for Rissalat Al Ouma, a Casablanca newspaper.
