= Jenny Rakotomamonjy =

Malagasy-born French cartoonist and animator

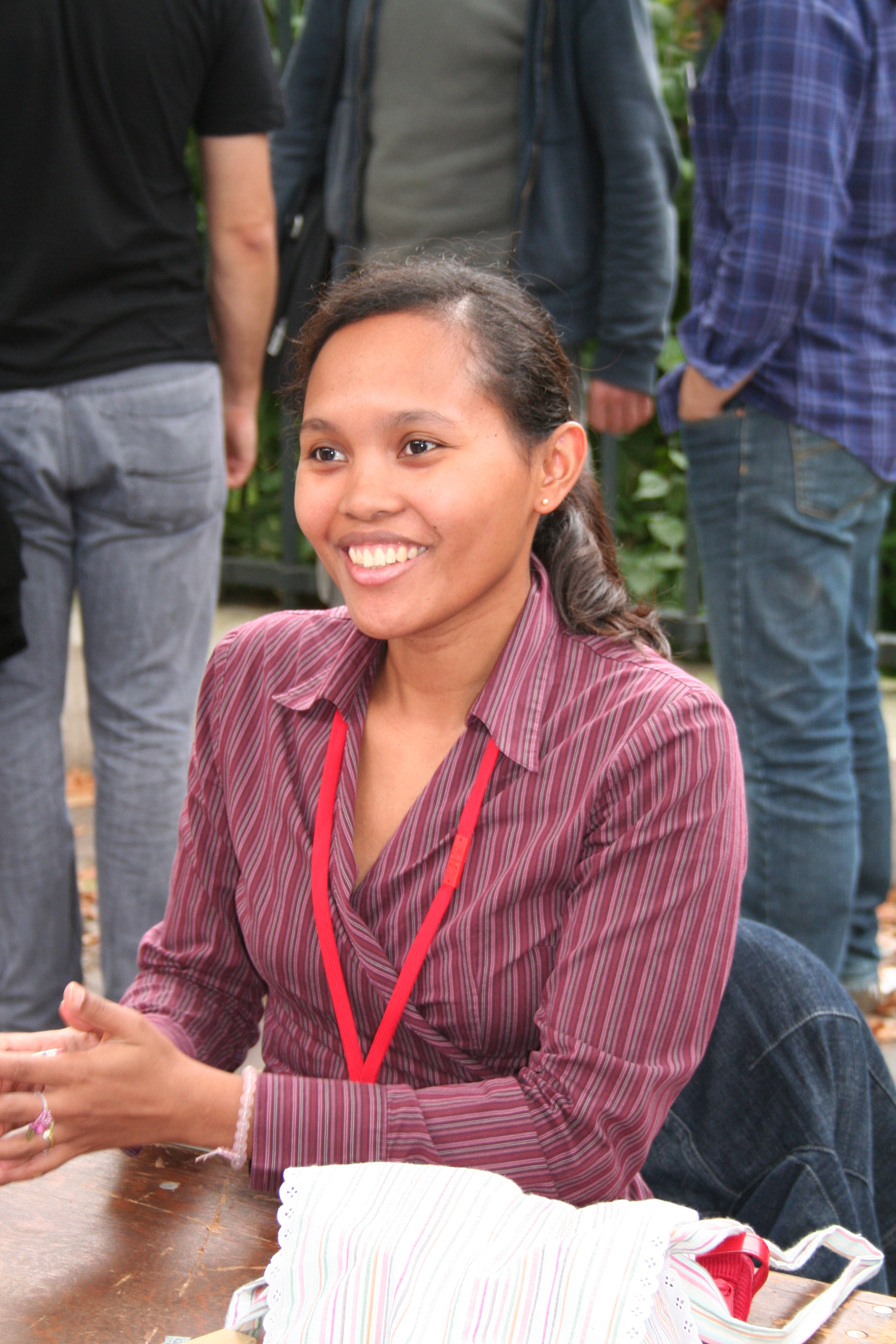
- Jenny at the Delcourt Festival in Paris, France, in 2006
- Born: 1979 (age 46–47); Antananarivo, Madagascar
- Occupation: Cartoonist

Jenny Rakotomamonjy (born 1979), known by the pen name Jenny, is a Malagasy-born French cartoonist and animator. She is a co-founder of the Chibimag comics studio.

== Biography ==
Jenny Rakotomamonjy was born in Antananarivo, Madagascar, in 1979. At age 3, she left the island with her parents and moved to the Paris suburbs. She studied art at the University of Paris 1 Pantheon-Sorbonne's Saint-Charles Center, then completed a two-year program on animation at Gobelins, l'École de l'image.

In 2002 Jenny, who signs her work with only her first name, produced her first animated short, Le Papillon, with Antoine Antin. The short was chosen for the Canal J Prize at that year's Annecy International Animation Film Festival. Shortly thereafter, she was hired by Marathon Animation to work on character design for the series Martin Mystery and storyboards for Totally Spies!

Jenny released her first comic, the shojo manga-style Pink Diary, in 2005. The Pink Diary series, published by Delcourt in France, won the 2006 prize for Best Manga-Style Bande Dessinée from the French magazine Animeland. It ran through 2008, after which Jenny launched a new series, Mathilde, followed by Sara et les Contes perdus. She has also worked on a spin-off of Patricia Lyfoung's La Rose écarlate series.

She also in 2003 became a founding member of the Chibimag comics studio, through which she has collaborated on various comic fanzines.

Jenny lives in Eure-et-Loir, France, where she frequently collaborates with her husband, the fellow comics creator Alexis Coridun.

== Selected works ==
- Pink Diary (8 books, complete series)
- Mathilde (5 books, complete series)
- Sara et les contes perdus (6 books, complete series)
- La Rose écarlate - Missions (10 books, complete series)
- Comme un garçon (6 books, complete series)
- Les Légendaires Résistance (4 books, ongoing series)
