= My Paranoid Next Door Neighbor =

Japanese manga

- Cover of the Tokuma Shoten release

隣の部屋のパラノイア (Tonari no Heya no Paranoia)
- Genre: Yaoi
- Manga
- Written by: Kazuka Minami
- Published by: Tokuma Shoten
- English publisher: NA: 801 Media
- Imprint: Chara Comics
- Magazine: Chara Selection
- Published: July 24, 2004
- Volumes: 1

My Paranoid Next Door Neighbor (Japanese: 隣の部屋のパラノイア, Hepburn: Tonari no Heya no Paranoia) is a one-shot Japanese manga by Kazuka Minami. It is licensed in North America by Digital Manga Publishing, which released the manga through its imprint 801 Media on August 20, 2007.

== Reception ==
ActiveAnime's Holly Ellingwood describes the story as being "about falling in love, running away, and facing your feelings, this is a little gem of a romance." Shaenon Garrity, writing for the appendix to Manga: The Complete Guide, enjoyed the "sex-positive manga", noting that there was little angst. Mania Entertainment's Danielle Van Gorder described Minami's art as "first-rate", enjoying its "sharp, assured lines, minimal shading, and plenty of detail". Johanna Draper Carlson regards My Paranoid Next Door Neighbor as being "all about the sex", noting the similarities in the storyline to a romance novel where a lower-status female is pursued by a higher-status man. Carlson admired the manga's steadfastness in including sex scenes, as she regards this as being a key draw of yaoi. An anonymous Publishers Weekly reviewer also noted the similarities to a romance novel, and criticized the youthful appearance of the character designs. The Publishers Weekly reviewer described the manga as having a "saturated atmosphere"..."satisfying the dedicated genre fan".
