= Between Friends (comics) =

Canadian comic strip

- Between Friends
- Author: Sandra Bell-Lundy
- Website: Between Friends
- Current status/schedule: running
- Launch date: (debut) May 1990; 35 years ago (syndication) February 1994; 31 years ago
- Syndicate(s): King Features Syndicate
- Genre(s): Humor, Politics, Family

Between Friends is an internationally syndicated comic strip written by Canadian Sandra Bell-Lundy. The comic strips appear in more than 175 newspapers in ten countries around the world. Three middle-aged professional women and the problems that they face in their lives are the main focus throughout the comic strip series. Initially, Maeve, Susan, and Kimberly were all childless, but Susan and Kimberly are now mothers. Between Friends initially appeared in the St. Catharines Standard in May 1990, and was syndicated by King Features in February 1994.

Bell-Lundy's original artwork used for the strips was displayed at Artway Gallery in Brampton, Ontario, in 2009.

== Characters ==
All the minor characters are connected to Kim, Maeve, or Susan.

Kimberly previously wrote a column on women's issues from home. She is currently a homemaker and struggling to find a new source of intellectual fulfilment.

- Derek, high school English teacher, was a single father before his new marriage to Kim.
- Danny has adjusted from being Derek's son to Derek and Kim's son. He is always in the latest kids' fads such as Pokémon, Crash Bandicoot, Yu-Gi-Oh!, and Duel Masters. He also loves food but hates making his own meals.

Maeve is a spicy divorcée who always has a snappy comeback. She's the one that a person always remembers at parties. She's a great Sales Director at the office, less great with her personal life.

- Helen is Maeve's co-worker, sounding board and voice of experience at the office. She's married with two kids in their pre-teens.
- Simon is Maeve's ex-husband. He periodically drops in and spreads chaos.

Susan like Maeve, works in a professional office. Previously she and her husband Harvey were DINKYs. After struggling with infertility treatments, they adopted a daughter, Emma.

- Harvey is a laid-back funeral director and Susan's supportive husband.
- Emma is Susan and Harvey's adopted daughter.
- Tina is Susan's office buddy and frazzled mom with two kids in diapers.

== Style ==
The strip is drawn in detail and appears in colour. It usually runs to four panels, the Sunday strip is in a two tiered format with a large throw away logo panel appearing on the left of the strip. The characters are shown living in their homes, or offices, but they are shown at the mall or the coffee shop from time to time. Unlike usual comics where the characters are frozen in time, here the characters are shown being aging. Emma and Danny, who were show as little tots, are now shown to be grown children.

Sometimes the strip is serialised with the story running for a week or more on occasions. Susan's and Harvey's fertility treatment series and subsequently their adoption series ran with breaks from 1997 to 1998. The fertility treatment series started 16 December 1996 until 11 February 1998 in a total of 35 daily strips. The adoptions series overlapped the fertility series and started on 16 December 1996 and ran till 16 May 1998 in a total of 32 daily strips.

An extended series concerning domestic violence and abusive relationships ran between July 1 and November 22, 2008. Maeve offers advice and support to her friend, Tamara, who feels trapped in an abusive marriage. A series on the social networking site Facebook ran for a week from May 11, 2009 to May 17, 2009 in which Susan is shown to be newly addicted to the site.

== Books ==
1. Hello, Daughter, Plan Nine Publishing
2. Coffee, Tea, and Reality: A Between Friends Collection, Andrews McMeel Publishing, ISBN 0-7407-4134-9

== See also ==
- Portrayal of women in comics
