= Belle Yang =

American writer

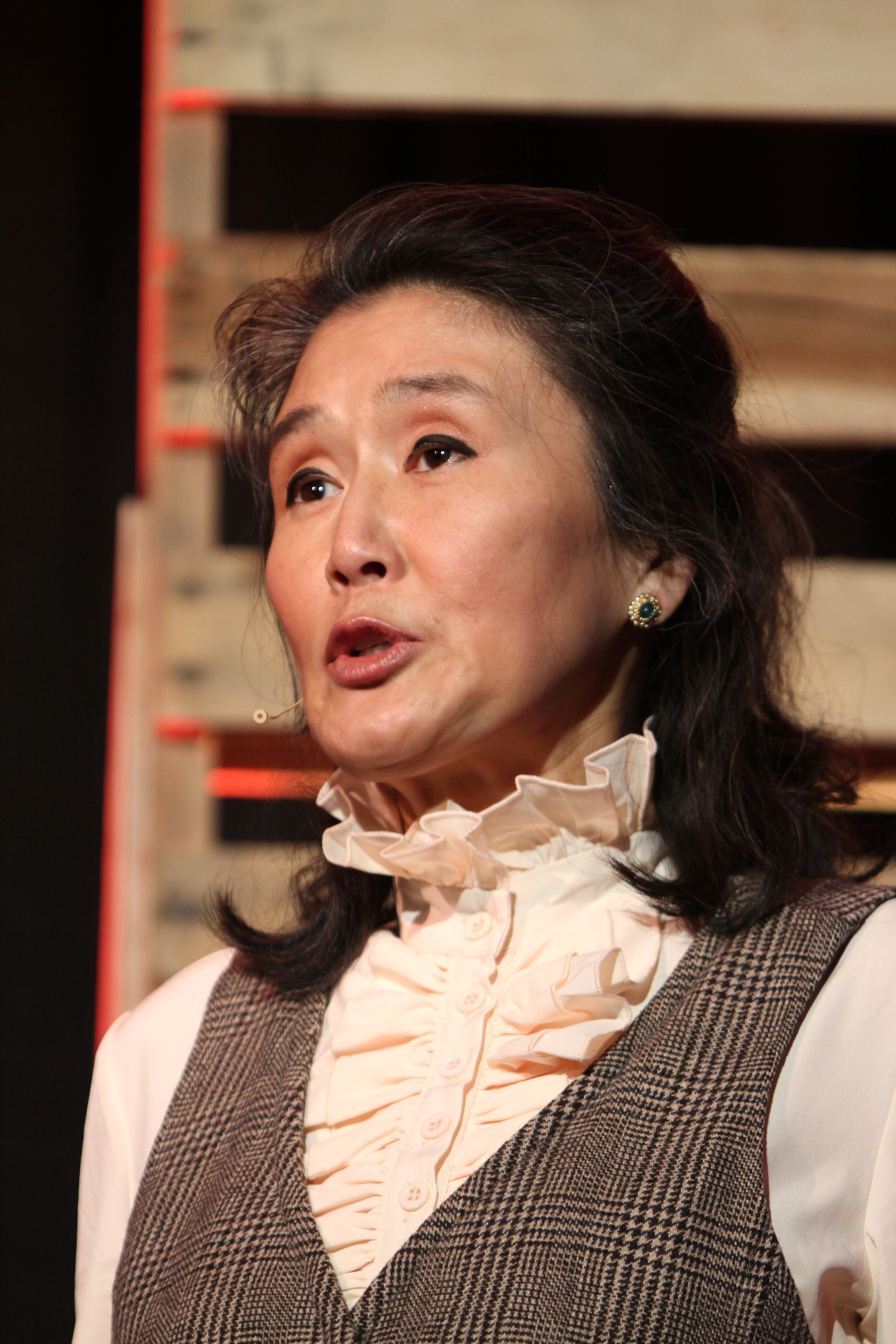
Belle Yang, 2013

Belle Yang (born 1960) is a Taiwanese-American artist, author, graphic novelist and children's book writer.

== Biography ==
Yang was born in Taiwan in 1960, and moved to the San Francisco Bay area with her parents when she was seven years old. She graduated from the University of California, Santa Cruz, with a degree in biology, then enrolled in art school. When an ex-boyfriend began harassing Yang, her parents sent her to live with friends of the family in Beijing. She spent three years in China, traveling the country and studying history and classical Chinese art. She was in Beijing during the 1989 Tiananmen Square protests, and returned to the US later that year. Once home, she started recording her parents' stories of their life in China, and that led to her first book, Baba, A Return to China Upon My Father's Shoulders, in 1994. The book, published by Harcourt Brace, was about her father, Joseph Yang, walking out of a 1940s war-torn China.

Author Amy Tan, who wrote the foreword to Baba, says that "Belle Yang is an American writer who writes in English and thinks in Chinese". Maxine Hong Kingston compared Yang's art and writing to that of Isaac Bashevis Singer and Marc Chagall. The Kirkus Review wrote that "Yang's work is like a lovely painted scroll swimming with wild souls, beasts, birds, flowers, day and night sky, tragedy, and hope".

In 1996, Yang wrote a second book about her father's exodus from China, Odyssey of a Manchurian. She completed the trilogy, in 2010, with publication by W.W. Norton and Company of the graphic novel Forget Sorrow, An Ancestral Tale.

Yang has also written children's books including Chili-Chili-Chin-Chin, Foo the Flying Frog of Washtub Pond, Always Come Home to Me and My Name Is Hannah, a retelling of her family waiting for its green card after entering the United States.

Yang has had numerous museum exhibitions, including a national tour in its third year, Crossing Cultures: Belle Yang, A Story of Immigration. She is the subject of a film documentary by Mac and Ava Motion Pictures that has been telecast on public television, My Name Is Belle.

== Selected works ==
- Yang, Belle (1996). Baba : a return to China upon my father's shoulders (1st Harvest Book ed.). New York: Harcourt Brace. ISBN 9780156002394.
- Yang, Belle (1996). The odyssey of a Manchurian (1st ed.). New York: Harcourt Brace. ISBN 9780151001750.
- Yang, Belle (1999). Chili-chili-chin-chin (1st ed.). San Diego, Calif.: Silver Whistle. ISBN 978-0152020064.
- Yang, Belle (2004). Hannah is my name (1st ed.). Cambridge, Mass.: Candlewick Press. ISBN 9780763622237.
- Yang, Belle (2007). Always come home to me (1st ed.). Cambridge, MA: Candlewick Press. ISBN 9780763628994.
- Yang, Belle (2009). Foo, the flying frog of Washtub Pond (1st ed.). Somerville, Mass.: Candlewick Press. ISBN 9780763636159.
- Yang, Belle (2010). Forget sorrow : an ancestral tale (1st ed.). New York: W.W. Norton. ISBN 9780393068344.
- Yang, Belle (2012). A nest in springtime : a bilingual book of numbers = Chun tian de niao chao (1st ed.). Somerville, Mass.: Candlewick Press. ISBN 9780763652791.
- Yang, Belle (2012). Summertime rainbow : a bilingual book of colors = Xia tian de cai hong (1st ed.). Somerville, Mass.: Candlewick Press. ISBN 9780763652807.
