= Patricia Lyfoung =

French cartoonist (1977–2025)

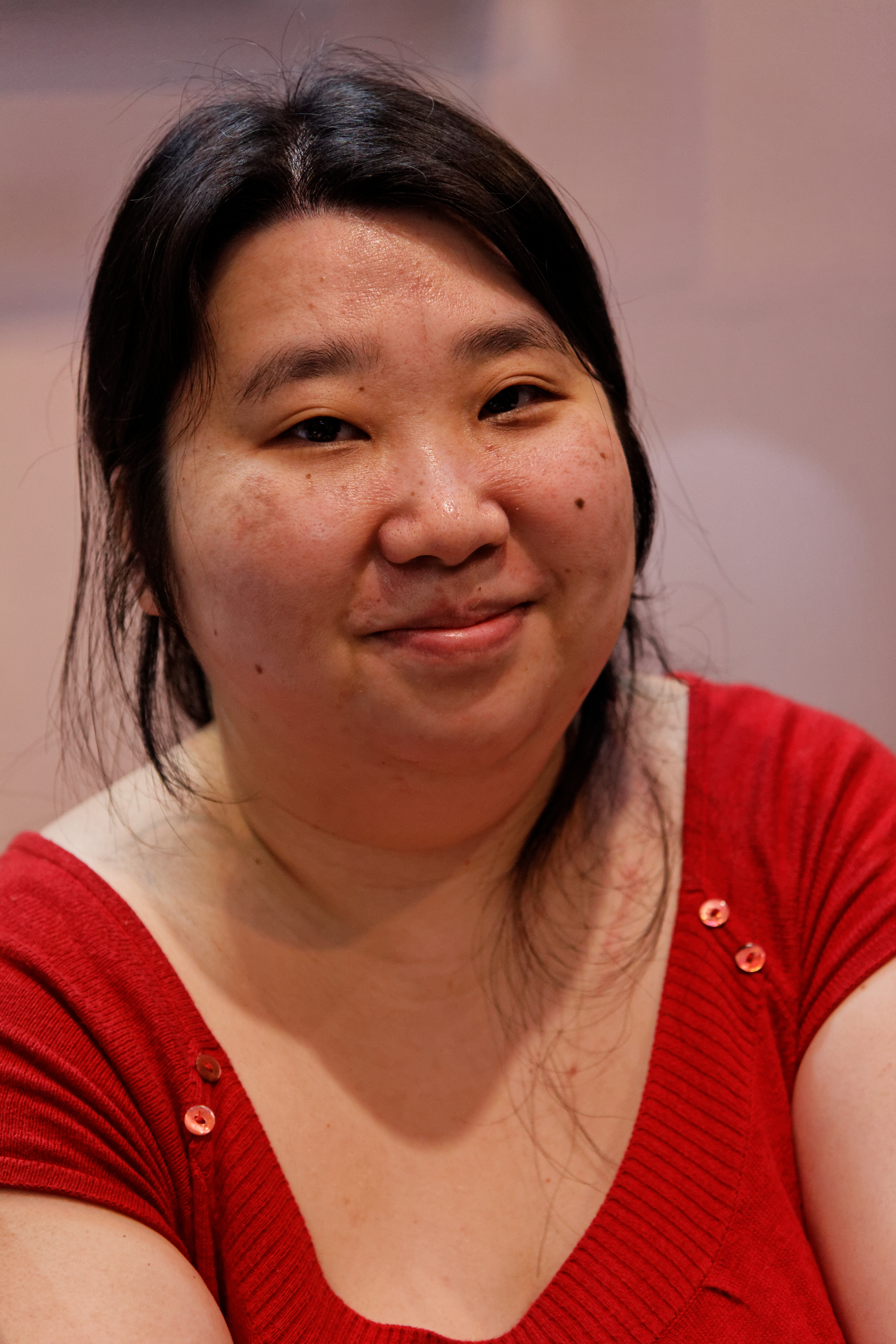
- Lyfoung in 2012
- Born: 18 December 1977; Villeneuve-la-Garenne, France
- Died: 15 January 2025 (aged 47)
- Occupation: Cartoonist
- Notable work: La Rose écarlate Les Mythics

Patricia Lyfoung (18 December 1977 – 15 January 2025) was a French cartoonist known for her series La Rose écarlate. Over a million copies of her work were sold in France in her lifetime.

== Life and career ==
Patricia Lyfoung was born on 18 December 1977, in Villeneuve-la-Garenne, France, to a Hmong family. She became interested in drawing at a young age and moved to Paris, studying art at the École Estienne and at Gobelins, l'École de l'image.

In 2001, she began working for the French studio Marathon Animation, collaborating on storyboards for Martin Mystery and Totally Spies!. She also worked as an illustrator for commercial and editorial clients.

By 2005, she had shifted to focus on comic books, publishing the first book in her young adult series La Rose écarlate with Delcourt. She was inspired by the aesthetic and costumes of the anime series The Rose of Versailles. Her other inspirations include the Japanese artists Rumiko Takahashi and Mitsuru Adachi, as well as the European comics creators Enrico Marini, Bernard Hislaire and Jean-Pierre Gibrat. She became well known for her blend of Japanese and European influences.

The series was a success, and she produced over a dozen issues plus a spin-off series, La Rose écarlate – Missions, with her fellow French comic artist Jenny. La Rose écarlate has also been translated into English and published by the American publisher PaperCutz under the name The Scarlet Rose.

Lyfoung began another series, Un prince à croquer, in 2012. Her subsequent project, launched in 2018, was Les Mythics, a kids' comic produced in collaboration with her husband, fellow comic artist Philippe Ogaki, and Patrick Sobral.

Lyfoung's nearly 60 titles sold over a million copies in France during her lifetime.

== Death ==
She died on 15 January 2025, at the age of 47.

== Selected works ==
- La Rose écarlate (18 books)
- La Rose écarlate – Missions (9 books)
- Un prince à croquer (4 books)
- Les Mythics (22 issues)
