= Stand Still, Stay Silent =

Finnish-Swedish webcomic

- The logo as depicted above each page.
- Author(s): Minna Sundberg
- Website: sssscomic.com
- Current status/schedule: Complete
- Launch date: 1 November 2013
- End date: 28 March 2022
- Publisher(s): Hiveworks
- Genre(s): Post-apocalyptic fiction

Stand Still, Stay Silent is a Finnish webcomic started by Minna Sundberg, which ran 2013–2022. Set in post-apocalyptic Scandinavia, the webcomic incorporates Norse mythology, focusing on an adventure into the external "silent world". Reviewers have praised it for its beautiful visuals and cartography. It received a Reuben Award in the "Online Long Form" category in 2015.

== Overview ==
Stand Still, Stay Silent portrays a post-apocalyptic Scandinavia, set in the near future but echoing a mythical Nordic past populated by legendary monsters and human mages alike.

The narrative begins with a prologue depicting groups of families and strangers around present-day Scandinavia, all witnessing the early phases of a pandemic. The plot, however, picks up a century later with their descendants: "poorly funded and terribly unqualified" researchers venturing outside the heavily fortified settlements that make up what remains of the known world. Their adventures in the ruined "silent world" have been compared to a travelogue by Comic Book Resources.

Sundberg is a fan of maps and topography, and her comic makes extensive use of projections of coastlines, mountains, and fjords, as well as charts including a language family tree. These and other expository insertions (such as in-world advertisements) provide context on the regions the characters visit, the hazards they face, and the subtle and overt ways their world has diverged from the reader's own.

== Development ==
Sundberg created the 500-page long "practice" webcomic A Redtail's Dream in 2012 while studying graphic design in the university of industrial arts in Helsinki. After finishing it, she started Stand Still, Stay Silent in November 2013. Since then, she has held an Indiegogo crowdfunding campaign to publish a print version of the webcomic, which earned almost $125,000 USD. On 27 September 2018, the first "adventure" of the comic ended, with Adventure 2 beginning on 14 October 2018. The 1534th page of Stand Still, Stay Silent was released on 28 March 2022, ending the comic.

== Reception ==
Etelka Lehoczky of NPR praised Sundberg's artwork, saying that "her style isn't unique, and it certainly isn't experimental, but it's perfectly assured" and that though Sundberg's characters "are immediately situated in a comfortable cartoony world", the post-apocalyptic compositions and intricate maps of the world are "awe-inspiring". Emily Gaudette of Inverse called the artwork in Stand Still, Stay Silent reminiscent of J. R. R. Tolkien's drawings of Middle-earth and described it as "breathtaking".

The comic's narrative technique was commended by Emma Lawson of ComicsAlliance, who called its use of exposition "interesting", and praised the fantasy-esque take on a post-apocalyptic setting. Lauren Davis, writing for io9, concurred, stating that "Sundberg has a remarkable ability to balance the charming and the creepy". Though Comic Book Resources complained that Sundberg's use of character profiles "tends to take you out of the story", they still recommended the comic overall.

In 2015, Stand Still, Stay Silent won a Reuben Award in the "Online Long Form" category.

== Books ==
- Sundberg, Minna: Stand Still Stay Silent Book 1, s. 324. Author's Edition, 2015. ISSN 2342-8880 (print) ISSN 2342-8899 (online).
- Sundberg, Minna: Stand Still Stay Silent Book 2, s. 260. Hiveworks Comics, 2018. ISBN 978-1-946698-06-3
- Sundberg, Minna: Stand Still Stay Silent Book 3, s. 304. Hiveworks Comics, 2020. ISSN 2342-8880 (printed book), ISSN 2342-8899 (online).
- Sundberg, Minna: Stand Still Stay Silent Book 4, s. 220. Hiveworks Comics, 2023. ISBN 978-1-946698-33-9 (print)
- Sundberg, Minna: Stand Still Stay Silent Livre 1, s. 328. Édition Akileos, 2018. ISBN 978-2-35574-353-5
- Sundberg, Minna: Stand Still Stay Silent Livre 2, s. 260. Édition Akileos, 2019. ISBN 978-2-35574-363-4
- Sundberg, Minna: Stand Still Stay Silent Livre 3. s. 304. Édition Akileos, 2020. ISBN 978-2-35574-453-2
