= Lucie Lomová =

Czech comics artist

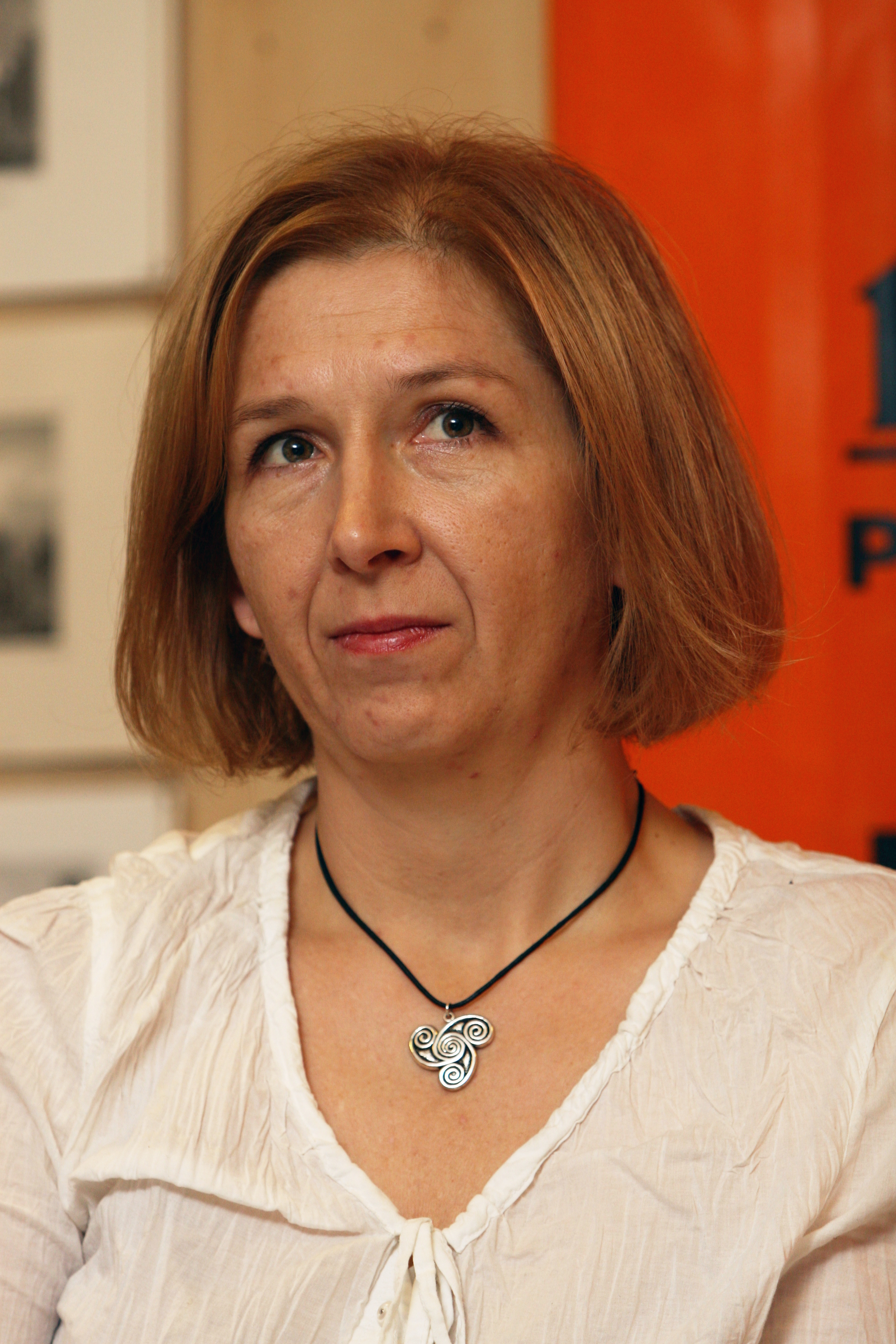
Lucie Lomová (2008)

Lucie Lomová (born 23 July 1964 in Prague, Czechoslovakia) is a Czech comics author.

She has studied dramatics. She is known for her series Anča a Pepík.
