= Raquel Riba =

Spanish illustrator and author of comics (born 1990)

Raquel Riba Rossy
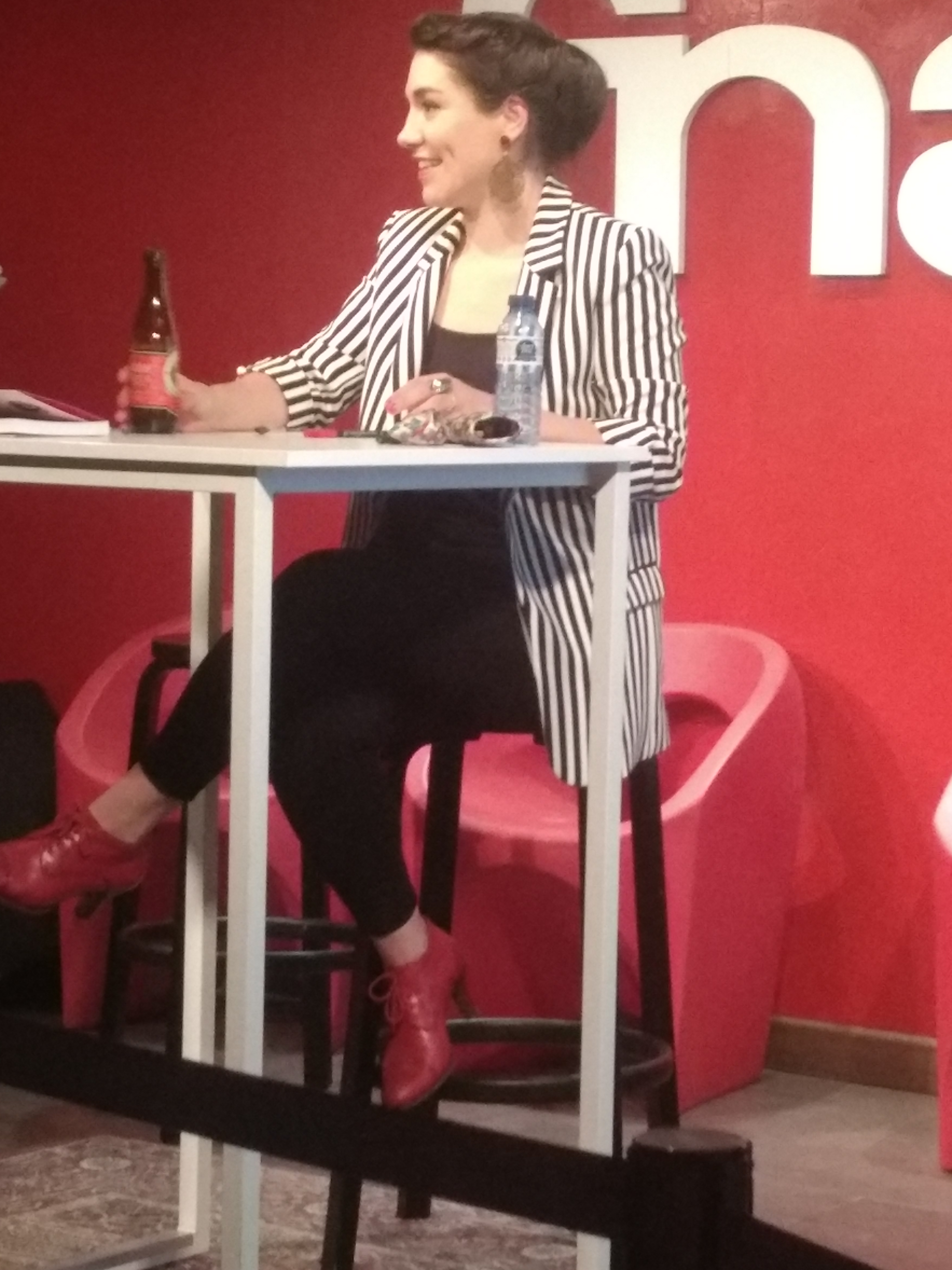
- Born: 10 July 1990 (age 35); Igualada, Barcelona, Spain
- Occupations: Comic writer and illustrator

Raquel Riba is a Spanish illustrator and author of comics. Her most famous character is Lola Vendetta, a comedic feminist hero.

== Biography ==
She studied Fine Arts at the University of Barcelona (2008-2012) specializing in drawing, painting, sculpture and engraving. In 2013 he continued studying at the Escola de la Dona to study drawing and illustration. She became known in 2014, especially on social networks, particularly on Facebook with the creation of her most famous character, Lola Vendetta. She describes this character as an "illustrated hit woman" with a striped shirt, red lips and black hair. Lola Vendetta criticizes the toxic conformity of society, questioning conventional parameters and vindicating the role of women. Usual themes of her comics are menstruation, the mystique of motherhood and machismo (both explicit and subtle). The first paper comic of Lola Vendetta was published in 2017.

== Bibliography ==
- (2014) "Ilustración del libro de cuentos “Marta, el Hada mágica… un poco desordenada.”
- (2017) "Lola Vendetta. Más vale Lola que mal acompañada".
- (2018) "Lola Vendetta. ¿Qué Pacha, Mama?".
- (2019) "Lola Vendetta. Y los hombres".
