= Haruka Minami (manga artist) =

Japanese manga artist

- Born: Fukushima Prefecture, Japan
- Other name: Kazuka Minami
- Occupation: Manga artist
- Known for: My Paranoid Next Door Neighbor

Haruka Minami (みなみ 遥, Minami Haruka), also known as Kazuka Minami (南 かずか, Minami Kazuka), is a Japanese manga artist and illustrator. Minami primarily draws for the boys' love manga genre and debuted as a manga artist in 1996 with the comic Strawberry Children.. Her work is characterised by the young appearance of her bishounen character designs and for her "extreme" and repetitive sex scenes. In addition to manga, Minami also provides illustrations for BL light novels and visual novels.

== Works ==
- Strawberry Children (1997-2004)
- Koibito Shigan (コイビト志願) (2001)
- Forbidden Sweet Fruit (禁断の甘い果実) (2003)
- Love a la Carte! (レンアイ・アラカルト!) (2003)
- Haitoku no rabu sikku (背徳のラブ♥シック) (2003)
- My Paranoid Next Door Neighbor (2007)
