= Ana Oncina =

Spanish comic book illustrator (born 1989)

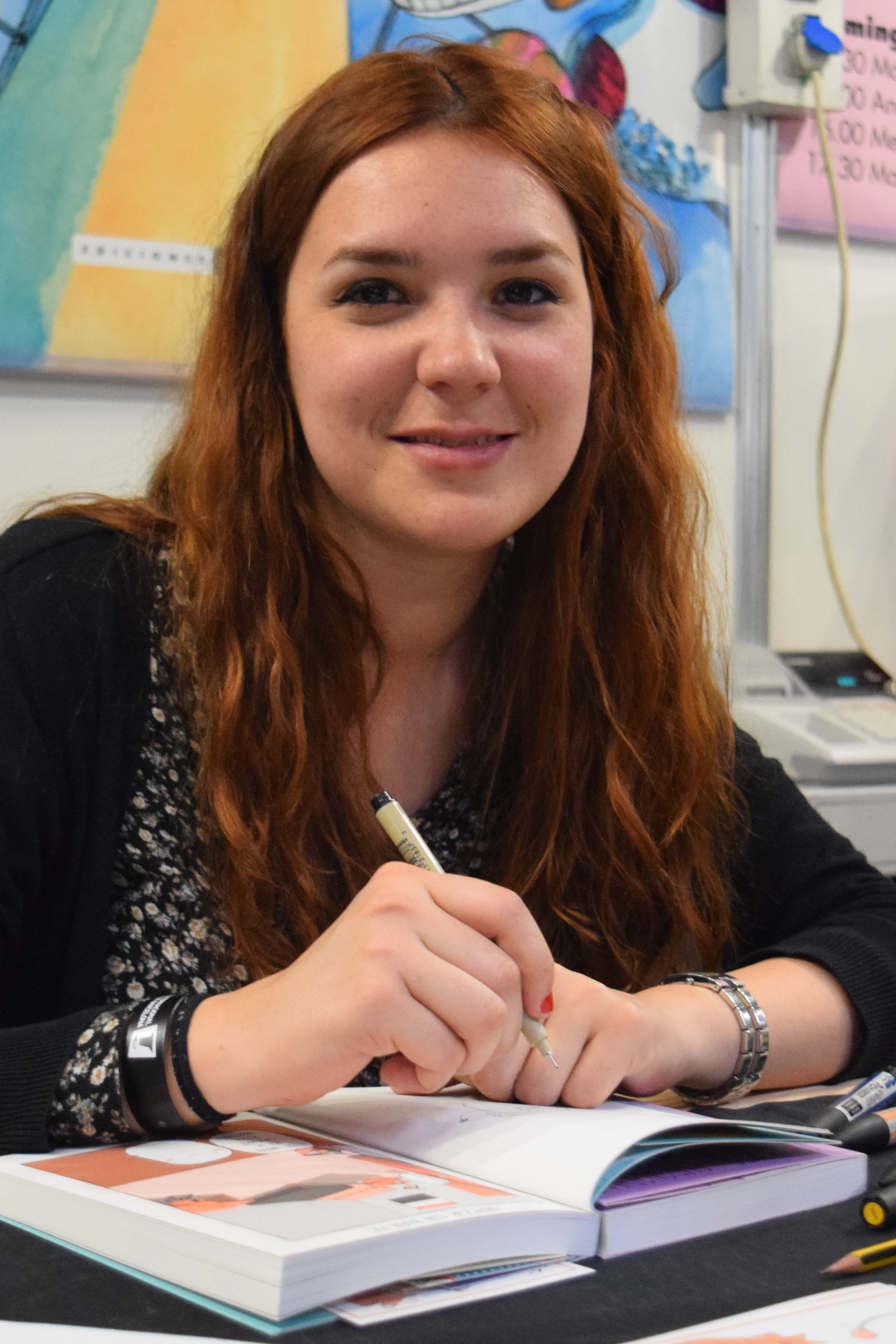
Ana Oncina in 2017

Ana Oncina (born 1989) is a Spanish-born freelance comic book illustrator and author whose work is particularly known in Spain, Italy and France. Her first book, Croqueta y empanadilla (2014), won the Popular Prize at the International Comic Book Fair of Barcelona in 2015 and is in its 12th series. In 2017 it was included in the list of creators under the most influential 30 years of the moment in Europe that prepares the Financial Forbes magazine.

Born in Elda in Spain, Oncina took her degree in Fine Arts from the University of Valencia where she specialized in animation and illustration. Her first comic book Croqueta y empanadilla (Croquette and Pasty) (2014) was sent as a project to Ediciones La Cúpula and she was called by an editor the next day asking to buy the work for publication. In five months the first edition and two reprints were sold out becoming a public success and establishing Oncina among the forefront of female comic book illustrators in Spain. It is currently in its 12th series; her second book Una navidad con Croqueta y empanadilla (A Christmas with Croquette and Pasty), also published in 2014, is in its 3rd series.

Oncina also coordinates publication of the comic magazine Voltio, in which she also participates as an author; in the illustration of children's books (Truffles in Hollywood and Xenia) and has produced work for the City Council of Madrid. Forbes magazine has placed her among its most influential under 30s in the category of Art.
