= Makoto Koshinaka =

Koshinaka Makoto (越中睦士)
- Born: July 15, 1980 (age 46); Tokyo, Japan
- Genres: Rock, pop rock, folk rock
- Occupations: Singer-songwriter, actor, model
- Years active: 1999–present

Makoto Koshinaka (越中睦 / 越中睦士 or Makoto, born July 15, 1980, in Moto Azabu, Tokyo) is a Japanese singer, songwriter, actor and model, active in both Japan and in Thailand starting in 1999. His musical career covers various musical styles (from pop rock, folk rock, solo as Makoto, and with the visual kei bands Lucifer and †яi¢к, under the agencies Unlimited Records, BM Factory, Crown Records, T.N.B and, currently, SCSC Records). His acting career covers roles in stage plays, TV dramas and feature movies.

== Biography ==
=== Lucifer ===
Koshinaka started his career in 1999 as lead singer of the Japanese rock band Lucifer. An incarnation of the characters in Mayu Shinjo's manga and subsequent anime series "Kaikan Phrase" ("Sensual Phrase"), the group continued producing music after the release of its first album, specially created for anime, collaborating with several famous Japanese musicians. The band became internationally renowned. The group disbanded in 2003, but reunited briefly in November 2009 for a special tour which took place between August and September 2010, with concerts in Osaka, Nagoya, Tokyo and Bangkok, Thailand, before an audience of more than four thousand fans.

=== Solo musical career ===
After the first disbanding of Japanese rock band Lucifer, Koshinaka started a solo career under the simple name "Makoto". He switched to his own musical style, folk rock and with this new sound released the mini-album "Vibration" in October 2003, and the singles "Secret Colors" and "Rise" in 2007. On the international scene, he participated in the Pattaya International Music Festival in Thailand in 2005. The following year, Makoto was invited to participate to a three-days visit to promote tourism in the Pattaya area. In 2007, his first full-length solo album "Flair," was released. The album marked his return to the Japanese musical scene after several years of activity in Thailand, and was very well received. His activity on the musical scene in Thailand continues. At the end of the year 2012 he participated in prestigious charity concert, "Jazz for His Majesty," held on December 19 at the Royal Paragon Hall, for His Majesty, the King of Thailand.

=== †яi¢к ===
Since 2010, Makoto Koshinaka has been lead vocalist of the visual kei rock band TRICK (stylized as †яi¢к). This marked another change in his musical style, now transitioning to metal, which he declared in interviews had always attracted him. The other members of the band are guitar: Taiji Fujimoto (ex. D･T･R, Groove Master, The Dead Pop Stars); guitar: Shintaro Mizuno; bass: Shuse (ex. La'cryma Christi, Acid Black Cherry); drums: Tero (ex. Vidoll). The band headlined Music Japan Plus's MJP Gig on June 23, 2012, at Shibuya O-East. The event was available to more than 30,000 viewers at home, live broadcasting through NicoNico.

The band also targets international audiences outside of Japan's domestic market. †яi¢к made its international debut in Thailand on September 24, 2011, with the mini-concert "We are †яi¢к". The band has released three singles to date, in 2012: "Phenomena", "Scar" and "Love Rain" (released on November 21 and ranked a few days later, on December 3, on the 18th place in the Oricon Indies Chart). Their third single was immediately followed by two consecutive concerts in Osaka on 24 and 25 November. On December 1, 2012, the band participated in the festival LOFT「master+mind」presents "Rock is Culture 2013."

The beginning of the year 2013 marked another concert on 17 March, SHUSE Birthday Presents & TAIJI 50th Anniversary「LOVE RAIN」~Epilogue~, at EDGE Ikebukuro. †яi¢к toured Japan in the summer of 2013 as follows: June 16 – Sapporo, June 21 – Nagoya, June 22 – Osaka, June 25 – Fukuoka, June 29 – Tokyo. The band released its first album on May 22, 2013. On October 18, 2013, the band took part in the concert Legend Rokumeikan PART III〜GENERATION CRASH.

On October 28, 2013, †яi¢к participated in a sponsored event, BULL ZEICHEN 88, "Fall Battle Royal 2013" at Shibuya O-West. On October 30, 2013, the band released its fourth single "Changin' The New World." On 11 February 2014, †яi¢к participated in『MUSCLE ATTACK 1st LIVE TOUR ～Road Of Muscle～』at Shinjuku BLAZE. On June 1, 2014, they participated in the live DearLoving×NINJAMAN JAPAN "BROTHER BATTLE" at Takadanobaba CLUB PHASE.

=== Acting career ===
Aside from singing, Makoto Koshinaka is a model and stage actor in dramas and feature films. In 2000, he acted in stage play "NINAGAWA-火の鳥", followed in 2003 by "Reign of terror." In 2002 he took on a role in Shakespeare's play "A Midsummer Night's Dream". He starred in the feature film "嗤う伊右衛門 Warau-iemon", in 2004. Also in 2004, he got a part in the TV drama "Be-bop high school". In 2005, he played a part in the stage play "Little Shop of Horrors". In 2010 he got the lead role in the play "うりずんの風" and acted in the feature film "美しき女豹 Beautiful female panther: Body sniper". In 2014, Makoto Koshinaka starred in a Japanese-Thai movie directed by Tanwarin Sukkhapisit, "Love Sud Jin Fin Sugoi", co-starring with Suppanad Jittaleela, Apinnya Sakuljarunsoek and Tao Sattaphong Phiangpor. The movie premiered at the Osaka Asian Film Festival 2014.

=== Press ===
During 2005-2006 he starred a series of interviews for the magazine "A/r/e/c/o/l/e アレコレ", issues 1–23, documenting his acting and musical career at the time, and was featured in several Japanese magazines such as "TV Bros", "Look at Star!" vol. 17 (covering the stage play "Little Shop of Horrors") and "Theater Guide Magazine" vol. 166 (also about the play "Little Shop of Horrors"). In 2008-2009 he was featured in several issues of magazine "J-Spy," including vol. 109, vol. 117, vol. 131 (Special interview with Makoto Koshinaka). In 2011 he was featured in a special edition of Thai magazine "ผู้หญิง" ("Woman"), vol. 559, with the title "The Mission of Stars". His visit to Thailand in December 2012 was covered in an article on Asian Plus Magazine, vol. 6, issue 85. On October 12, 2013, he was featured in top fashion photographer Leslie Kee's exhibition "Super Love", featuring portraits of some 500 well-known artists, dancers, creators, actors, models and media personalities. In April 2014 he was featured in Thai publication I Like, volume 13, number 273.

=== Charity work ===
Makoto Koshinaka is an active supporter of the International Peace Foundation.

== Discography ==
With Lucifer:

Studio albums:

- (December 8, 1999) Limit Control
- (February 21, 2001) Beatrip
- (March 13, 2002) Element of Love

Compilations:

- (December 5, 2002) The Best

Singles:

- (September 15, 1999) Datenshi Blue
- (November 3, 1999) C no Binetsu
- (February 16, 2000) Tokyo Illusion/Lucy
- (June 7, 2000) Carnation Crime
- (August 2, 2000) Junk City
- (November 8, 2000) Tsubasa
- (August 1, 2001) Hypersonic Soul
- (February 6, 2002) Regret
- (August 7, 2002) Realize

DVDs:

- (May 30, 2001) Be-Trip Tour 2001
- (June 28, 2000) Vision File Film: Escape (PV compilation DVD)
- (November 7, 2001) Vision File Film: Escape 2 (PV compilation DVD)
- (March 26, 2003) Last Tour 2002-2003 Energy Tour Final at Tokyo Kokusai Forum (live DVD)

Solo:

Albums:

- (October 22, 2003) VIBRATION (mini album)
- (September 26, 2007) flair

Singles:

- (December 17, 2003) Mado

Live album:

- (October 16, 2004) VIBRATION

Digital singles:

- Secret Color
- Blue Moon

Collaborations:

- (March 16, 2006) S2 - the EP "Just Like Me" (duet with Kim Soo-hyun)

With TRICK (†яi¢к):

Special:

- (September 15, 2010) Tribute to Seikima-II – Akuma to no Keiyakusho- Song「怪奇植物」 (Kaiki Shokubutsu)

Singles:

- (March 17, 2012) Phenomena
- (July 25, 2012) SCAR
- (November 21, 2012) Love Rain
- (October 30, 2013) Changin' The New World
- (March 19, 2014) RADIANT

Albums:

* (May 22, 2013) METHOD

== Actor ==
Drama:

- Semi Double (on Fuji TV 1999)
- Psychometre Eiji 2 (on NTV 1999)
- Hikon Kazouku (on TV Tokyo 2001)
- Ketsumyaku (on TV Tokyo 2003)
- Jikuukeisatu PART3 (on NTV 2003)
- Be-Bop High School (on TBS TV 2004)
- Suiyoumisutiri-9 (on TV Tokyo 2005)
- Koisuronichiyoubi (on BS-i 2005)
- Be-bop high school 2 (on TBS TV 2005)

Stage:

- NINAGAWA-火の鳥 (2000)
- 夏の夜の夢 A Midsummer Night's Dream (2002)
- 恐怖時代 Reign of terror (2003)
- リトルショップ・オブホラーズ Little Shop of Horrors (2005)
- うりずんの風 (2010)

Movie:

- 嗤う伊右衛門 Warau-iemon(2004)
- 美しき女豹 Beautiful Female Panther: Body Sniper (2010)
- Fin Sugoi (2014)
