= List of Sensual Phrase chapters =

Cover of the first volume of the Viz Media English release of Sensual Phrase, published in North America on March 24, 2004

The chapters of the manga series Sensual Phrase were written by Mayu Shinjo. The first chapter premiered in Shōjo Comic in 1997, where it was serialized monthly until its conclusion in 2000. The series focuses on the romance between Sakuya Ookochi, the lead singer of a Japanese band known for its explicit lyrics, and Aine Yukimura, a high school student who becomes their lyricist after Sakuya accidentally reads the lyrics of a song she has written. In addition to their own relationship insecurities, Aine struggles to deal with jealous fans, unwanted attention from other men, and enemies of the band seeking to use her to hurt Sakuya.

The individual chapters were collected and published in 17 tankōbon volumes by Shogakukan under their "Flower Comics" imprint starting on June 26, 1997; the last volume was released on January 26, 2001. An additional volume was released on April 24, 2003, containing a sequel chapter for the story and additional unrelated short stories. Shogakukan republished the serialized chapters across six shinsoban hard cover editions in 2003 and re-released the original 17 volumes in 2006 with new covers. Sensual Phrase was adapted into six light novels containing side stories from the series. The series was also adapted into a 44-episode anime series by Studio Hibari that aired in Japan on TV Tokyo from April 20, 1999, to March 25, 2000. The anime was partially a prequel to the manga focusing on the band's beginnings more than Aine and Sakuya's relationship. The manga series is licensed for regional language releases by Editorial Ivréa in Spain and Latin America, Pika Edition in France, Egmont Manga & Anime in Germany, and Star Comics in Italy. It was serialized in Germany in Manga Twister and in Italy in Amici.

Sensual Phrase is licensed for an English-language release in North America by Viz Media, including the special final volume. It released the first volume of the series on March 24, 2004; the final volume was released on February 13, 2007.

== Volume listing ==
No.	Original release date	Original ISBN	North America release date	North America ISBN
1	June 26, 1997	978-4-09-136835-5	March 24, 2004	978-1-59116-205-6
2	September 26, 1997	978-4-09-136836-2	June 9, 2004	978-1-59116-334-3
3	December 15, 1997	978-4-09-136837-9	August 11, 2004	978-1-59116-449-4
4	March 26, 1998	978-4-09-136838-6	September 22, 2004	978-1-59116-411-1
5	June 26, 1998	978-4-09-136839-3	December 14, 2004	978-1-59116-560-6
6	August 22, 1998	978-4-09-136840-9	February 8, 2005	978-1-59116-671-9
7	October 26, 1998	978-4-09-137691-6	April 12, 2005	978-1-59116-734-1
8	February 24, 1999	978-4-09-137692-3	June 15, 2005	978-1-59116-803-4
9	April 22, 1999	978-4-09-137693-0	August 16, 2005	978-1-59116-867-6
10	July 22, 1999	978-4-09-137694-7	October 11, 2005	978-1-4215-0013-3
11	October 26, 1999	978-4-09-137695-4	December 13, 2005	978-1-4215-0107-9
12	January 26, 2000	978-4-09-137696-1	February 14, 2006	978-1-4215-0265-6
13	March 25, 2000	978-4-09-137697-8	April 11, 2006	978-1-4215-0395-0
14	June 26, 2000	978-4-09-137698-5	June 13, 2006	978-1-4215-0559-6
15	August 24, 2000	978-4-09-137699-2	August 8, 2006	978-1-4215-0560-2
16	November 25, 2000	978-4-09-137700-5	October 10, 2006	978-1-4215-0561-9
17	January 26, 2001	978-4-09-137729-6	December 12, 2006	978-1-4215-0562-6
18 (Note: Volume 18 was originally released in Japan as Kaikan Furēzu Tokubetsu Hen (快感♥フレーズ 特別編; lit. Pleasant Sensation ♥ Phrase Special Compilation))	April 24, 2003	978-4-09-137730-2	February 13, 2007	978-1-4215-0847-4
