= Kagura (disambiguation) =

Kagura can refer to several things:

== Ceremonies ==
- Kagura - a particular type of traditional Shinto ritual dance.

== Fictional characters ==
- Kagura (Inuyasha), a character in the manga series Inuyasha
- Kagura Mutsuki, a character from the BlazBlue series.
- Kagura Tsuchimiya, the protagonist of Ga-rei
- Kagura, a Demon Love Spell character
- Kagura Sohma (Sōma Kagura), a Fruits Basket character
- Kagura, an Azumanga Daioh character
- Ten'nōzu Kagura, a Speed Grapher character
- Chizuru Kagura, a King of Fighters character
- Maki Kagura, a King of Fighters character
- Kagura, a Gintama character
- Mayo Kagura, a My-HiME Destiny character
- Kagura Izumi, a Ressha Sentai ToQger character
- Kagura from Senran Kagura video game franchise
- Kagura from Mobile Legends: Bang Bang mage hero of moba mobile video game

== Other ==
- Kagura (band), an indie rock band from Northern Ireland
- Kagrra, a Japanese rock band
- Kagura (ethnic group), an ethnic group in Tanzania.
