= Lucifer (Japanese band) =

Japanese rock band

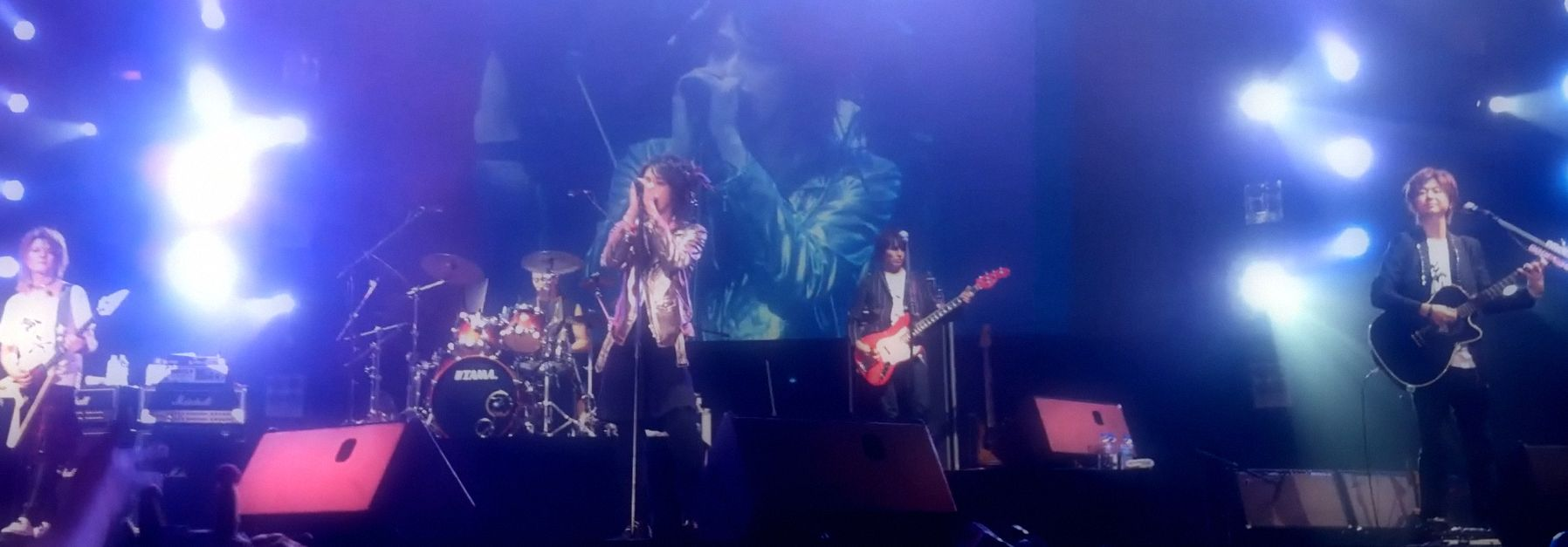
- Lucifer performing in Indoor Stadium Huamark 2010. From left to right: Yuki, Santa, Makoto, Towa, Atsuro

Background information
- Origin: Japan
- Genres: Alternative rock; hard rock; pop rock
- Years active: 1999–2003; 2009–2012
- Labels: Massive records, Unlimited Records, T.N.B. Entertainment
- Past members: Makoto; Yuki; Atsuro; Towa; Santa
- Website: Lucifer's Online

Lucifer (リュシフェル, Ryushiferu) (stylized as Λucifer) was a Japanese visual kei rock band, best known for contributing several of their songs to the popular anime, Kaikan Phrase. The band was formed in 1999, and disbanded in early 2003. They officially debuted on 15 September 1999 with their big hit single Datenshi BLUE, and became increasingly popular thereafter.

== History ==
Lucifer was put together for the Kaikan Phrase anime to promote it. The anime was based on the a popular shōjo manga by Mayu Shinjo. The band members of real life Lucifer changed their names to match with their anime/manga counterparts, except for the vocalist, who kept his name instead of changing it to Sakuya (the main character's name). Several of Lucifer's songs were used in the anime, along with songs from other bands like Glay, Feel and e.MU. However, the band decided to go on even after the anime had ended, and continued to release more music afterwards.

Then finally on 25 October 2002, over two and a half years after the anime had ended, they announced that they were breaking up. Following the announcement, they did their last tour entitled "Lucifer Last Live 2002–2003 Energy" from 16 December 2002 to 10 January 2003, which included 9 shows. After that, they appeared for the last time in a TV music show, PopJam, on 11 January and then did their very last show (which was also their first show done abroad) at the Impact Arena in Bangkok, Thailand on 19 January.

On the first album, the music was written by Takuya Asanuma (Judy and Mary), Chisato (Penicillin) and Ippei and Taizo (Feel) but after that, the members of the band started writing more. Beatrip featured one song from Atsuro and one from Santa, and the rest were by Takuya and Chisato, but by the third album, nearly all the music had been written by members of the band, save for one song by Takuya, and two of the songs Makoto did that were done as a collaboration with Masaki. The lyrics on the first two albums were all written by Mori Yukinojo (except for one song on Beatrip, which Makoto wrote). On the third album, only the lyrics to the song by Takuya were written by Mori and the rest were done by the band members.

== After the break-up of the band ==
- Makoto has gone on a solo career (first using his given name, then used his full name). Towa and Santa also played on his first mini-album "Vibration".
- Towa is in two bands called Olive Sunday and Birth of Life and has done some solo work as well. He is also arranged many songs for J-pop idols AKB48 and other related groups.
- Santa is with Towa in Olive Sunday. He is also a working actively as a session drummer and has played a few soundtracks. These include Anna Tsuchiya's first mini-album "Taste My Beat". Since 2007, He has been taking part in many of Miliyah Kato's live tours.
- Yuki formed Dustar-3 with two ex-members of Sex Machineguns, Noisy and Himawari. He is also collaborating with Janne Da Arc's yasu on his solo project, Acid Black Cherry. In 2010, he joined Rayflower, a rock band started by Sophia's keyboardist Keichii Miyako.
- Atsuro has been playing session guitar for J-pop artists like meg rock, Marika and Chieko Kawabe. He briefly joined a rock band Tokyo Anastasia. He also produces and arranges songs for an extraordinary number of J-pop artists, including Aya Hirano, Shoko Nakagawa, and Minori Chihara.

They were reunited in November 2009 and signed with new label T.N.B. Entertainment.

== Members ==
- Sakuya (Makoto Koshinaka) – vocals
- Atsuro (Daisuke Kato) – guitar
- Yuki (Masahiko Yuki) – guitar
- Towa (Taguchi Tomonori) – bass
- Santa (Abe Toru) – drums

== Discography ==
Studio albums

- Limit Control (Dec 8 1999, No. 6 Oricon)
- Beatrip (Feb 21 2001, No. 10)
- Element of Love (Mar 13 2002, No. 17)

Compilations

- The Best (Dec 5 2002, No. 15)

Singles

- "Datenshi Blue" (Sep 15 1999, No. 16)
- "C no Binetsu" (Nov 3 1999, No. 8)
- "Tokyo Illusion/Lucy" (Feb 16 2000 No. 11)
- "Carnation Crime" (Jun 7 2000, No. 9)
- "Junk City" (Aug 2 2000, No. 9)
- "Tsubasa" (Nov 8 2000, No. 11)
- "Hypersonic Soul" (Aug 1 2001, No. 16)
- "Regret" (Feb 6 2002, No. 18)
- "Realize" (Aug 7 2002, No. 15)

DVDs

- Be-Trip Tour 2001 (live DVD, May 30, 2001, No. 1)
- Vision File Film: Escape (PV compilation DVD, Jun 28 2000, No. 4)
- Vision File Film: Escape 2 (PV compilation DVD, Nov 7 2001)
- Last Tour 2002–2003 Energy Tour Final at Tokyo Kokusai Forum (live DVD, Mar 26 2003)
- 10th Anniversary Live Tour Rinne 2010.09.01 AKASAKA BLITZ (live DVD, Dec 25 2010)
