= Tomokazu Seki =

Japanese voice actor and singer (born 1972)

- 関 智一
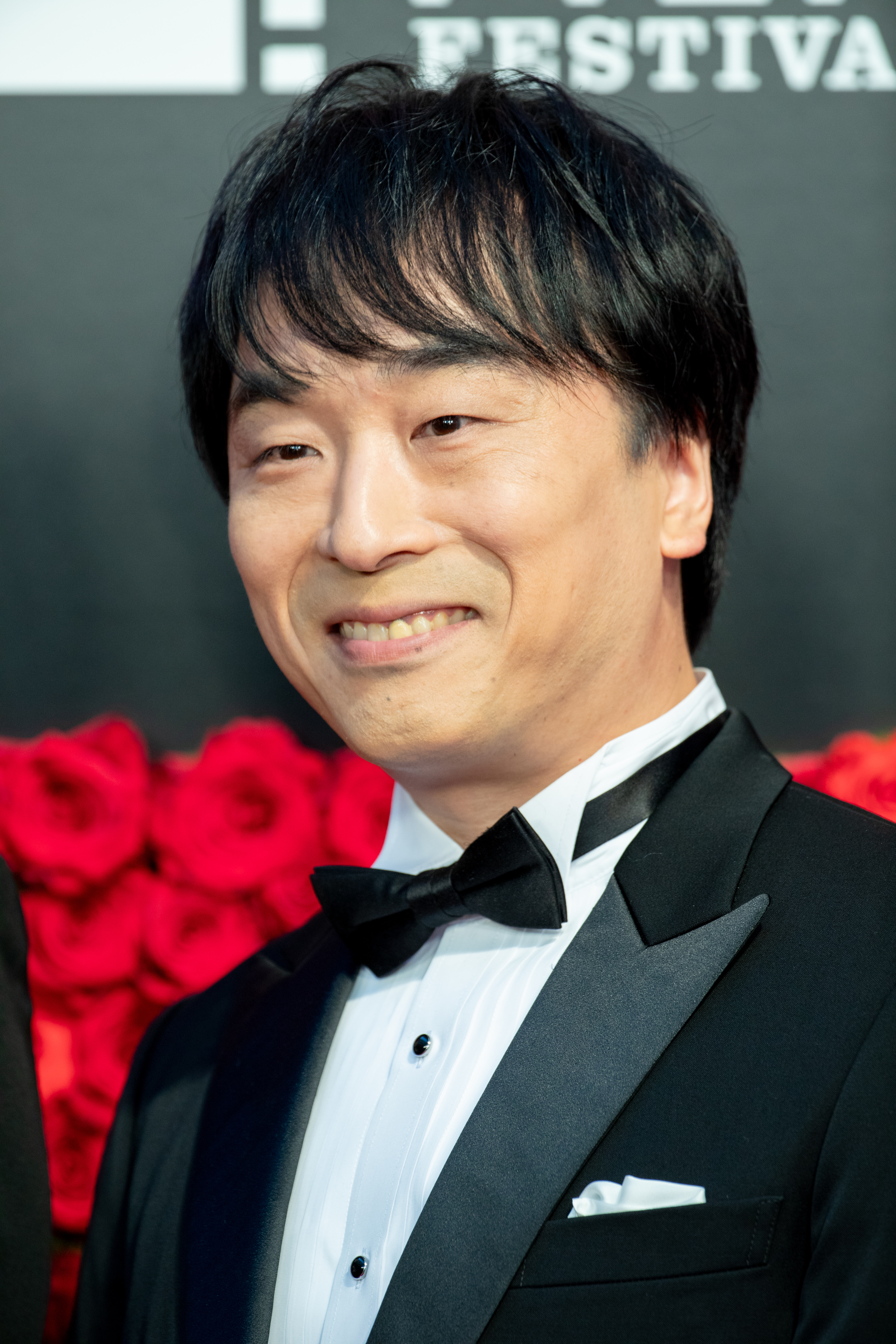
- Seki at the Opening Ceremony of the Tokyo International Film Festival 2018
- Born: September 8, 1972 (age 54); Kōtō, Tokyo, Japan
- Other names: SekiTomo (関智); Chiichi (チイチ); Seki-san (関さん); Seki-chan (関ちゃん)
- Occupations: Voice actor; singer
- Years active: 1993–present
- Agent: Atomic Monkey
- Website: Official profile

Tomokazu Seki (関 智一, Seki Tomokazu; born September 8, 1972) is a Japanese voice actor and singer. He was previously affiliated with Haikyō. He is honorary president of and is affiliated with Atomic Monkey and the chairman of Theater Company HeroHero Q. He is also a special lecturer at Japan Newart College.

== Career ==
Seki landed his first role in the 1993 anime Mobile Suit Victory Gundam as Tomache Massarik. Some of his most notable roles include Shinichi Chiaki from Nodame Cantabile, Gilgamesh from the Fate franchise, Rob Lucci from One Piece, Gundam characters Domon Kasshu and Yzak Joule (from Mobile Fighter G Gundam, Mobile Suit Gundam SEED, and Mobile Suit Gundam SEED Destiny, respectively), Kyo Sohma from Fruits Basket, Whisper from Yo-kai Watch, Kanji Tatsumi from Persona 4, Shinya Kogami from Psycho-Pass, Ichiro Miyata from Hajime no Ippo, Haru Glory from Rave Master, Toya Kinomoto (Sakura Kinomoto's older brother) from Cardcaptor Sakura, Van Fanel from The Vision of Escaflowne, Suneo Honekawa in the Doraemon franchise, Enrico Pucci from JoJo's Bizarre Adventure, Chichiri from Fushigi Yuugi, and Ken Hidaka from Weiss Kreuz, alongside Hiro Yūki, Takehito Koyasu, and Shin-ichiro Miki. Koyasu and Miki, along with Seki, also had voice roles in Initial D as Keisuke Takahashi, Gravitation, and Nobuo Terashima in Nana. Seki has also voiced Ryūki Shi in Saiunkoku Monogatari, recurring guest character Meito Anizawa in Lucky Star, and Shōji Tōkairin in You're Under Arrest and related media, along with Sakiko Tamagawa, Akiko Hiramatsu, and Yoshiko Sakakibara.

On November 20, 2017, Seki apologized on the online radio program Unizon for an incident which had taken place a day earlier, during an event for the online radio program A&G All Star 2017, where he had instructed Yusuke Tonozaki, a newbie voice actor from his agency, to ask voice actress Rina Hidaka to have sex with him (one of them both) as a joke.

== Filmography ==
=== Television animation ===
Year	Title	Role	Notes
1993	Mobile Suit Victory Gundam	Tomache Massarik, Chris Royd	
1994	Aoki Densetsu Shoot	Keigo Mahori	
1994	Mobile Fighter G Gundam	Domon Kasshu	
1994	Captain Tsubasa J	Ken Wakashimazu, Carlos Santana	
1994	Tottemo! Luckyman	Tensaiman	
1995	Neon Genesis Evangelion	Tōji Suzuhara	
1995	Mobile Suit Gundam Wing	Maser (episodes 13–16), OZ Soldier (episode 11), Communications man (episode 2), Auda, Reporter B	
1995	Wedding Peach	Igneous	
1995	Fushigi Yugi	Chichiri, Koji	
1996	The Vision of Escaflowne	Van Fanel	
1996	Those Who Hunt Elves	Junpei	
1996	Martian Successor Nadesico	Tsukumo Shiratori, Gai Daigoji	
1997	Maze:The Mega-burst Space	Akira Ikagura/Maze (male)	
1997	Ninpen Manmaru	Tsunejiro	
1997	Flame of Recca	Tsukishiro	
1997	You're Under Arrest	Shoji Tokairin	
1998	Cardcaptor Sakura	Toya Kinomoto	
1998	Cyber Team in Akihabara	Takashi Ryugasaki	
1998	Weiß Kreuz	Ken Hidaka	
1998	Initial D	Keisuke Takahashi	
1998	Ojarumaru	Gera	
1999	One Piece	Rob Lucci, Hattori	
1999	Oruchuban Ebichu	Kaishonachi	
1999	Great Teacher Onizuka	Kunio Murai	
1999	Infinite Ryvius	Ikumi Oze	
1999	Pocket Monsters: Episode Orange Archipelago	Kenji (Tracey Sketchit)	
1999	Pocket Monsters: Episode Gold & Silver	Kenji (Tracey Sketchit)	
2000	Ceres, Celestial Legend	Alexander O. Howell	
2000	Gate Keepers	Reiji Kageyama	
2000	Vandread	Bart Garsus	
2000	Gravitation	Shuichi Shindo	
2000	Hajime no Ippo	Ichiro Miyata	
2001	Fruits Basket	Kyo Sohma (cat zodiac)	
2001	Captain Tsubasa: Road to 2002	Tsubasa Ohzora (adult)	
2001	Samurai Girl: Real Bout High School	Shizuma Kusanagi	
2001	Star Ocean EX	Ashton Anchors	
2001	Angelic Layer	Masaharu Ogata	
2001	Groove Adventure Rave	Haru Glory	
2002	Full Metal Panic!	Sousuke Sagara	
2002	Naruto	Sagi	
2002	Mobile Suit Gundam SEED	Yzak Joule	
2002	Samurai Deeper Kyo	Shinrei	
2002	Mirage of Blaze	Mori Ranmaru	
2002	Azumanga Daioh: The Animation	Chiyo's Father	
2002	Tokyo Underground	Rumina Asagi	
2002	Chobits	Hiromu Shinbo	
2002	Kanon	Jun Kitagawa	
2002	GetBackers	Miroku Natsuhiko	
2002	Mirage of Blaze	Satoshi Hatayama	
2002	Monkey Typhoon	Sanzo	
2003	Bobobo-bo Bo-bobo	Giga	
2003	Ayu Mayu Gekijou	Kouda Kouji	
2003	Last Exile	Ethan	
2003	Konjiki no Gash Bell!!	Aleshie	
2003	Gungrave	Brandon "Beyond the Grave" Heat	
2003	Gad Guard	Seikai	
2003	Full Metal Panic? Fumoffu	Sousuke Sagara	
2003	Pocket Monsters Side Stories	Kenji (Tracey Sketchit)	
2003	Pocket Monsters: Advanced Generation	Kenji (Tracey Sketchit)	
2004	Monster	Karl Neumann	
2004	Ninja Nonsense	Sasuke	
2004	Mobile Suit Gundam SEED Destiny	Yzak Joule	
2004	Black Jack	Black Jack (teenager)	
2004	Area 88	Mickey Simon	
2004	Tetsujin 28-go	Detective Seki	
2004	Zoids: Fuzors	Alpha Richter	
2004	Meine Liebe	Eduard	
2004	My-HiME	Yuuichi Tate	
2004	Bleach	Shinobu Eishima, Masayoshi	
2004	Futari wa Pretty Cure	Mepple	
2004	Harukanaru Toki no Naka de ~Hachiyou Shou~	Tenma Morimura	
2004	Tenjho Tenge	Masataka Takayanagi	
2004	Genshiken	Soichiro Tanaka	
2004	Mars Daybreak	Gram River	
2004	Gankutsuou: The Count of Monte Cristo	Marquis Andreaa Cavalcanti	
2005	Doraemon	Suneo Honekawa	
2005	Yakitate! Japan	Pierrot Bolnezeu	
2005	MÄR	Magical Roe	
2005	Full Metal Panic! The Second Raid	Sousuke Sagara	
2005	Angel Heart	Shougo Shimazu	
2005	Futakoi Alternative	Rentaro Futaba	
2005	Viewtiful Joe	Joe	
2005	Futakoi Alternative	Rentaro Futaba	
2006	Fate/stay night	Gilgamesh	
2006	Kanon	Jun Kitagawa	
2006	Kenichi: The Mightiest Disciple	Kenichi Shirahama	
2006	Buso Renkin	Moon Face, Hiwatari Sekima	
2006	Coyote Ragtime Show	Katana	
2006	Digimon Savers	Neon	Episode 8
2006	NANA	Nobuo Terashima	
2006	Saiunkoku Monogatari	Ryuki Shi	
2007	Nodame Cantabile	Shinichi Chiaki	
2007	Lucky Star	Meito Anizawa	
2007	Mononoke	Genyousai Yanagi	
2007	Devil May Cry: The Animated Series	Vincent	Episode 2
2007	Wangan Midnight	Deceased Devil Z Owner	
2007	Kishin Taisen Gigantic Formula	Wen-Yee Li	
2008	Nodame Cantabile: Paris-Hen	Shinichi Chiaki	
2008	Rosario + Vampire	Ginei Morioka	
2008	Rosario + Vampire Capu2	Ginei Morioka	
2008	Casshern Sins	Jin	
2008	Persona: Trinity Soul	Toru Inui	
2008	Kimi ga Aruji de Shitsuji ga Ore de	Ren Uesugi	
2008	Himitsu – Top Secret	Tsuyoshi Maki	
2008	Telepathy Shojo Ran Jiken Note	Isozaki Rin	
2009	Fairy Tail	Lucky	
2009	The Tower of Druaga	Dark Gilgamesh	
2009	Soten Koro	Liu Bei	
2010	Giant Killing	Takeshi Tatsumi	
2010	Nodame Cantabile: Finale	Shinichi Chiaki	
2010	Sengoku Basara II	Mitsunari Ishida	
2010	Angel Beats!	Igarashi	Episode 8
2010	Arakawa Under the Bridge x Bridge	Captain	
2010	Koihime Muso	Fake Ryubi	
2010	Sengoku Basara II	Mitsunari Ishida	
2011	Beelzebub	Hidetora Tōjō	
2011	Fate/Zero	Gilgamesh	
2011	Persona 4: The Animation	Kanji Tatsumi	
2011	Sket Dance	Sojiro Agata	
2011	Future Diary	Marco Ikusaba	
2011	Steins;Gate	Hashida Itaru	
2012	Hakuouki Reimeiroku	Ryūnosuke Ibuki	
2012	Psycho-Pass	Shinya Kogami	
2012	Sword Art Online	Kibao	
2012	Saint Seiya Omega	Virgo Fudo	
2012	Fate/Zero	Archer/Gilgamesh	
2012	Cho Soku Henkei Gyrozetter	Mic-Man Seki	
2014	Fate/stay night: Unlimited Blade Works	Gilgamesh	
2014	Kamigami no Asobi	Melissa	
2014	Persona 4: The Golden Animation	Kanji Tatsumi	
2014	Yowamushi Pedal	Eikichi Machiyama	
2014	Strange+	Ko	
2014	Yōkai Watch	Whisper	
2015	Fate/stay night [Unlimited Blade Works] 2nd Season	Gilgamesh	
2015	Fate/kaleid liner Prisma Illya 2wei Herz!	Black Servant/Gilgamesh	Episode 6-8
2015	One Punch Man	Stinger	
2015	Gangsta	Striker	
2015	Garo: The Animation	Michael	
2015	Chaos Dragon	Qisha Tianling	
2015	Saint Seiya: Soul of Gold	Rize Andreas	
2015	Garo: Crimson Moon	Ashiya Douman	
2016	Grimgar of Fantasy and Ash	Renji	
2016	Nanbaka	Hajime Sugoroku	
2016	Ashura: Dark Phoenix	Ashura (Teenager)	
2016	Shōwa Genroku Rakugo Shinjū	Yotarō	
2016	Joker Game	Sakuma, Yoru	
2016	Sweetness and Lightning	Yūsuke Yagi	
2016	Nobunaga no Shinobi	Mori Yoshinari, Imagawa Yoshimoto	
2017	Gin Tama	Pluto Batou	
2017	Infini-T Force	Ken Washio / Gatchaman	
2017	My Hero Academia season 2	Selkie	
2017	Clean Freak! Aoyama-kun	Kaoru Zaizen	
2017	Garo: Vanishing Line	Sword	
2018	Cardcaptor Sakura: Clear Card	Toya Kinomoto	
2018	Full Metal Panic! Invisible Victory	Sousuke Sagara	
2018	Gakuen Basara	Ishida Mitsunari	
2018	Steins;Gate 0	Hashida Itaru	
2018	Zoids Wild	Gallagar	
2019	Demon Lord, Retry!	Isami Tahara	
2019	Fire Force	Rekka Hoshimiya	
2019	Demon Slayer: Kimetsu no Yaiba	Sanemi Shinazugawa	
2019	Fate/Grand Order - Absolute Demonic Front: Babylonia	Gilgamesh, Wolfgang Amadeus Mozart (episode 4)	
2019	Blade of the Immortal -Immortal-	Sōri	
2019	Psycho-Pass 3	Shinya Kogami	
2020	Drifting Dragons	Crocco	
2020	Somali and the Forest Spirit	Kokilira	
2020	Great Pretender	Ishigami	
2020	The God of High School	Announcer T / Shim Bongsa	
2020	Jujutsu Kaisen	Panda	
2020	Dragon Quest: The Adventure of Dai	Hadlar	
2021	Back Arrow	Sola Athin	
2021	Yo-kai Watch Jam – Yo-kai Academy Y: Close Encounters of the N Kind	Haruhiko Usumizawa	
2021	Record of Ragnarok	Lü Bu	
2021	My Hero Academia season 5	Selkie^{Ep. 104 credits}	
2021	Girlfriend, Girlfriend	Milika's Father^{Ep. 6 credits}	
2022	The Prince of Tennis II: U-17 World Cup	Zeus Iliopoulos, Thalatta Heracles, Papadopoulos Evangelos, Vulcan Lartius, Hermes Kounellis, Orion Stephanopoulos, Apollon Stephanopoulos	
2022	Golden Kamuy 4th Season	Fusatarō Ōsawa	
2023	High Card	Ban Klondike	
2023	MF Ghost	Keisuke Takahashi	
2023	Jujutsu Kaisen season 2	Panda	
2023	Berserk of Gluttony	Greed	
2024	Blue Exorcist: Shimane Illuminati Saga	Lewin Light	
2024	Grendizer U	Zurill	
2024	Kinnikuman: Perfect Origin Arc	Ramenman, Kinkotsuman	
2024	Wistoria: Wand and Sword	Workner Norgram	
2024	Dandadan	Dover Demon	
2024	Neko ni Tensei Shita Oji-san	President	
2024	Ranma ½	Ichiro	
2024	Beastars Final Season	Deshico	
2024	Dragon Ball Daima	Majin Kuu	
2025	Clevatess	Rodd	
2025	Fate/strange Fake	Archer	
2025	Gnosia	Shigemichi	
2026	High School! Kimengumi	Rei Ichidō	
2026	Jujutsu Kaisen season 3	Panda	
2026	Akane-banashi	Chocho Konjakutei	
2027	Shin Oishinbo	Seiichi Okaboshi	
2027	Kagurabachi	Kunishige Rokuhira	
TBA	The Boxer	K	

=== Original net animation (ONA) ===
Year	Title	Role
2021–2022	JoJo's Bizarre Adventure: Stone Ocean	Enrico Pucci
2023	Ōoku: The Inner Chambers	Mizuno Yūnoshin
2025	Bullet/Bullet	Qu-0213 Naka-ani

=== Original video animation (OVA) ===
Year	Title	Role
1993	Giant Robo	Genya/Emanuell, Koshin
1994	You're Under Arrest	Shoji Tokarin
1994	Kizuna: Bonds of Love	Toshi
1994	Natsuki Crisis	Keiji
1995	New Cutey Honey	Akira Fudo
1996	FAKE	Dee Laytner
1996	Fushigi Yugi	Chichiri, Koji
1996	Battle Arena Toshinden	Eiji Shinjo
1996	Maze	Maze (male)
1996	Psychic Force	Burn Griffith
1997	Eight Clouds Rising	Kuraki Fuzuchi; Manashi
1998	Getter Robo: Armageddon	Go
1999	High School Aurabuster	Kiba
1999	Gravitation	Shuichi Shindo
1999	Rurouni Kenshin: Tsuiokuhen	Katsura Kogoro
2000	Amon: Apocalypse of Devilman	Ryo Asuka, Satan
2001	Fushigi Yugi Eikoden	Chichiri
2001	Gundam Evolve	Domon Kasshu (Evolve 3)
2001	Vandread Integral	Bart Garsus
2001	Kikaider	Kikaider/Jiro
2001	Kizuna: Much Ado About Nothing	Toshi
2002	Vandread Turbulence	Bart Garsus
2002	Anime Tencho	Meito Anizawa
2002	Gate Keepers 21	Reiji Kageyama
2002	You're Under Arrest: No Mercy!	Shoji Tokarin
2002	Initial D:Battle Stage	Keisuke Takahashi
2002	Harukanaru Toji no Naka de ~Ajisai Yumigatari~	Tenma Morimura
2003	Hitsuji no Uta	Kazuna Takashiro
2003	Harukanaru Toki no Naka de 2 ~Shiroki Ryu no Miko~	Taira no Katsuzane
2004	Akane Matrix	Joji Goda
2004	Mirage of Blaze: Rebels of the River Edge	Satoshi Hatayama
2005	Mobile Suit Gundam Seed Destiny Final Plus: The Chosen Future	Yzak Joule
2005	Harukanaru Toki no Naka de ~Hachiyou Sho~	Tenma Morimura
2006	Genshiken	Soichiro Tanaka
2006	Mobile Suit Gundam Seed Destiny Special Edition	Yzak Joule
2007	Initial D: Battle Stage 2	Keisuke Takahashi
2007	Harukanaru Toki no Naka de 3 ~Kurenai no Tsuki~	Minamoto no "Kurou" Yoshitsune
2010	Harukanaru Toki no Naka de 3: ~Owari Naki Unmei~	Minamoto no "Kurou" Yoshitsune
2011	Air Gear: Kuro no Hane to Nemuri no Mori	Spitfire
2012	Kenichi: The Mightiest Disciple	Kenichi Shirahama
2013	Assassination Classroom	Koro-Sensei

=== Theatrical animation ===
Year	Title	Role
1993	Ocean Waves	Minarai
1994	Pom Poko	Male Tanuki B
1994	Aoki Densetsu Shoot!	Keigo Mahori
1995	2112: The Birth of Doraemon	Announcer
1996	X	Kamui Shiro
1997	Neon Genesis Evangelion: Death & Rebirth	Toji Suzuhara, SEELE Member
1997	Neon Genesis Evangelion: The End of Evangelion	Toji Suzuhara
1998	Doraemon: Nobita's Great Adventure in the South Seas	Mermaid
1999	Cardcaptor Sakura: The Movie	Toya Kinomoto
1999	The Pikachu Expedition	Kenji (Tracey Sketchit)
1999	Pocket Monsters the Movie – Mirage Pokémon: Lugia's Explosive Birth	Kenji (Tracey Sketchit)
1999	You're Under Arrest the Movie	Shoji Tokarin
2000	Pocket Monsters the Movie – Emperor of the Crystal Tower: Entei	Kenji (Tracey Sketchit)
2000	Leave it to Kero!	Toya Kinomoto
2000	Cardcaptor Sakura Movie 2: The Sealed Card	Toya Kinomoto
2000	Escaflowne	Van Fanel
2000	A Grandmother's Recollections	Young Suneo Honekawa
2001	Pocket Monsters the Movie – Celebi: Encounter Beyond Time	Kenji (Tracey Sketchit)
2001	Initial D: Third Stage	Keisuke Takahashi
2001	Inuyasha the Movie: Affections Touching Across Time	Menomaru
2002	Chinjo Shima no Chopper Oukoku	President Snake
2004	Doraemon: Nobita in the Wan-Nyan Spacetime Odyssey	Duk
2005	Futari wa Pretty Cure Max Heart: The Movie	Meeple
2005	Futari wa Pretty Cure Max Heart: Friends of the Snow-Laden Sky	Meeple
2006	Doraemon: Nobita's Dinosaur 2006	Suneo Honekawa
2006	Harukanaru Toki no Naka de ~Maihitoyo~	Tenma Morimura
2007	Doraemon: Nobita's New Great Adventure into the Underworld	Suneo Honekawa
2007	Evangelion: 1.0 You Are (Not) Alone	Toji Suzuhara
2008	Doraemon: Nobita and the Green Giant Legend	Suneo Honekawa
2009	Doraemon: The New Record of Nobita's Spaceblazer	Suneo Honekawa
2009	Evangelion: 2.0 You Can (Not) Advance	Toji Suzuhara
2010	Doraemon: Nobita's Great Battle of the Mermaid King	Suneo Honekawa
2010	Fate/stay night the movie: Unlimited Blade Works	Gilgamesh
2011	Doraemon: Nobita and the New Steel Troops ~Winged Angels~	Suneo Honekawa
2012	Doraemon: Nobita and the Island of Miracles ~Animal Adventure~	Suneo Honekawa
2013	Doraemon: Nobita's Secret Gadget Museum	Suneo Honekawa, Kaito DX
2014	Doraemon: Nobita in the New Haunts of Evil ~Peko and the Five Explorers~	Suneo Honekawa
2014	Stand by Me Doraemon	Suneo Honekawa
2014	Yo-kai Watch the Movie: Its the Secret of Birth, Meow!	Whisper
2015	Doraemon: Nobita's Space Heroes	Suneo Honekawa
2015	Psycho-Pass: The Movie	Shinya Kogami
2015	Yo-Kai Watch: Enma Daiō to Itsutsu no Monogatari da Nyan!	Whisper
2016	Doraemon: Nobita and the Birth of Japan 2016	Suneo Honekawa
2016	One Piece Film: Gold	Rob Lucci
2016	Kingsglaive: Final Fantasy XV	Luche Lazarus
2017	Doraemon: Nobita's Great Adventure in the Antarctic Kachi Kochi	Suneo Honekawa
2017	Fate/stay night: Heaven's Feel	Gilgamesh
2018	Doraemon: Nobita's Treasure Island	Suneo Honekawa
2018	Hug! Pretty Cure Futari wa Pretty Cure: All Stars Memories	Meeple
2019	Doraemon: Nobita's Chronicle of the Moon Exploration	Suneo Honekawa
2019	One Piece: Stampede	Rob Lucci
2019	Seven Days War	Immigration Administrator
2019	Yo-kai Watch Jam the Movie: Yo-Kai Academy Y – Can a Cat be a Hero?	Haruhiko Usumizawa
2020	Doraemon: Nobita's New Dinosaur	Suneo Honekawa
2020	Stand by Me Doraemon 2	Suneo Honekawa
2021	Sword Art Online Progressive: Aria of a Starless Night	Kibao
2021	Jujutsu Kaisen 0	Panda
2022	Doraemon: Nobita's Little Star Wars 2021	Suneo Honekawa
2022	Sword Art Online Progressive: Scherzo of Deep Night	Kibao
2023	Doraemon: Nobita's Sky Utopia	Suneo Honekawa
2023	Psycho-Pass Providence	Shinya Kogami
2023	Fate/strange Fake: Whispers of Dawn	Archer
2023	City Hunter the Movie: Angel Dust	Pirarucu
2024	Mobile Suit Gundam SEED Freedom	Yzak Joule
2024	Doraemon: Nobita's Earth Symphony	Suneo Honekawa
2025	Doraemon: Nobita's Art World Tales	Suneo Honekawa
2025	Detective Conan: One-eyed Flashback	Rikuo Hasebe
2025	Dream Animals: The Movie	Gotchan
2025	Demon Slayer: Kimetsu no Yaiba – The Movie: Infinity Castle	Sanemi Shinazugawa
2025	Whoever Steals This Book	Osamu Kikuchida
2026	Doraemon: New Nobita and the Castle of the Undersea Devil	Suneo Honekawa
2026	New Theatrical Movie Keroro Gunsō: Upon Revival, Immediately Facing the Threat of Earth's Destruction!	Warrior #7
2027	Doraemon: Nobita's Steam-Powered Time Machine	Suneo Honekawa

=== Drama CD ===
- Card Captor Sakura Original Drama Album 1 (1998) – Tōya Kinomoto
- Abunai series 1: Abunai Shuugaku Ryokou – Izumi Sudou
- Abunai series 4: Abunai Campus Love – Wataru Sawada
- Anatolia Story – Kikkuri
- Angel Sanctuary – Sandalphon
- Beauty Pop – Narumi Shogo
- Buso Renkin – Moon Face
- D.N.Angel Wink – Satoshi Hiwatari
- Dragon Knights – Rath Eryuser
- Everyday Everynight – Enohara Midato
- FAKE ~A Change of Heart~ – Dee Laytner
- Fate/Zero – Gilgamesh
- Fruits Basket – Kyo Sohma
- Gaki/Kodomo no Ryoubun – Kayano Hiromi
- Gaki no Ryoubun series 1: Kayanoke no Okite – Hiromi Kayano
- Gaki no Ryoubun series 2: Hasumi Koukou – Hiromi Kayano
- Gaki no Ryoubun series 3: Saikyou Hiiruzu – Hiromi Kayano
- Gaki no Ryoubun series 4: Uwasa no Shinzui – Hiromi Kayano
- Gaki no Ryoubun series 5: Akuun no Jouken – Hiromi Kayano
- Gaki no Ryoubun series 6: Manatsu no Zankyou – Hiromi Kayano
- Gaki no Ryoubun series 7: Monster Panic – Hiromi Kayano
- Gaki no Ryoubun series 8: Bunkiten Vol.1 Hottan – Hiromi Kayano
- Gaki no Ryoubun series 9: Bunkiten Vol.2 Haran – Hiromi Kayano
- Genso Suikoden II Drama CD – Luca Blight
- Haou Airen – Hakuron
- Juvenile Orion – Kusakabe Kaname
- Kimi ga Suki Nanosa – Tsugumi Kanou
- Love Celeb – Ginzo Fujiwara, Hakuron
- Mekakushi no Kuni – Naitō Arō
- Mossore
- Niji no Irie ~Trouble Studio~ – Kiwa Irie
- Rolex ni Kuchizukewo – Kazuya Yuu
- Rurouni Kenshin – Sagara Sanosuke
- Saiunkoku Monogatari – Ryūki Shi
- Sakurazawa vs Hakuhou series 1: Shokuinshitsu de Naisho no Romance – Katsumi Hirose
- Samurai Deeper Kyo – Shinrei
- Suikoden II – Luca Blight
- Tokyo Junk 1 & 2 – Yuuichi Sakura
- Yatteraneeze! – Takashi Masaki

=== Radio ===
- Fate/Zero Radio material – Gilgamesh
- Saiunkoku Monogatari – Ryūki Shi

=== Video games ===
- 2nd Super Robot Wars Z Saisei-Hen – Gou
- Another Century's Episode 2 – Domon Kasshu
- Apocripha/0 – Sapphirus Hawthorne
- Assassin's Creed II (Japanese version) – Ezio Auditore da Firenze
- Assassin's Creed: Brotherhood (Japanese version) – Ezio Auditore da Firenze
- Assassin's Creed: Revelations (Japanese version) – Ezio Auditore da Firenze
- Atelier Lise ~Alchemist of Ordre~ – Client Marif
- BlazBlue: Cross Tag Battle – Kanji Tatsumi (DLC)
- Bleach Wii: Hakujin Kirameku Rondo – Arturo Plateado
- Burning Rangers – Lead Phoenix
- Daraku Tenshi – The Fallen Angels – Haiji Mibu
- Dark Chronicle – Osmond
- Evil Zone (Eretzvaju) – Danzaiver – Sho Mikagami
- Fate/stay night – Gilgamesh
- Fate/tiger colosseum – Gilgamesh
- Fate/Unlimited Codes – Gilgamesh
- Fate/Extra CCC – Gilgamesh
- Fate/Grand Order – Gilgamesh, Wolfgang Amadeus Mozart
- Fate/Extella: The Umbral Star – Gilgamesh
- Fate/Extella Link – Gilgamesh
- Fate/Samurai Remnant – Gilgamesh
- God Eater 3 – Hugo Pennywort
- Gradius The Slot – Ace
- Granblue Fantasy – Gawain, Nicholas-[Original JP name]-(Shiro), Mepple (Mepple and Mipple), Suneo Honekawa
- Guilty Gear Xrd – Lucifero, Answer
- Guilty Gear -STRIVE- – Lucifero
- Hakuouki Reimeiroku – Ryunosuke Ibuki
- Harukanaru Toki no Naka de 1 – Morimura Tenma
- Harukanaru Toki no Naka de 2 – Taira no Katsuzane
- Harukanaru Toki no Naka de 3 – Minamoto no "Kurou" Yoshitsune
- Harukanaru Toki no Naka de 4 – Sazaki
- Harukanaru Toki no Naka de 5 – Seiryuu
- Higurashi No Naku Koro Ni Kizuna – Riku Furude
- Honkai Impact 3rd – Siegfried Kaslana
- Initial D Arcade Stage series – Keisuke Takahashi
- Invisible Sign series – Aizawa Shun
- J-Stars Victory VS – Koro-Sensei
- JoJo's Bizarre Adventure: All Star Battle R – Enrico Pucci
- JoJo's Bizarre Adventure: Last Survivor – Enrico Pucci
- Jujutsu Kaisen: Cursed Clash – Panda
- Katekyo Hitman Reborn DS: Fate of Heat II – Bligganteth
- Kamen Rider: Battride War Genesis – Great Leader of Shocker
- Legend of Dragoon – Dart Feld
- Lego Batman 3: Beyond Gotham (Japanese version) – Plastic Man
- Lunar: Silver Star Story – Kyle
- Marvel vs. Capcom 3: Fate of Two Worlds – Viewtiful Joe
- Ultimate Marvel vs. Capcom 3 – Viewtiful Joe
- Master Detective Archives: Rain Code – Zilch Alexander
- Mobile Suit Gundam: Gundam vs. Gundam – Domon Kasshu
- Mobile Suit Gundam: Gundam vs. Gundam Next Plus – Domon Kasshu, Yzak Joule
- Mobile Suit Gundam Side Story – Summona Fulis
- Namco × Capcom – Black Bravoman, Stahn Aileron
- Neon Genesis Evangelion: Girlfriend of Steel – Touji Suzuhara
- Neon Genesis Evangelion: Girlfriend of Steel 2nd – Touji Suzuhara
- Octopath Traveler – Alfyn
- Odin Sphere – Onyx
- Persona 4 – Kanji Tatsumi
- Persona 4 Golden – Kanji Tatsumi
- Persona 4 Arena – Kanji Tatsumi
- Persona 4 Arena Ultimax – Kanji Tatsumi
- Persona Q: Shadow of the Labyrinth – Kanji Tatsumi
- Phantasy Star Universe – Ethan Waber
- Private eye dol – Koji Sakaki
- SD Gundam G Generation – Summona Fulis, Domon Kasshu
- SD Gundam G Generation Spirits – Summona Fulis, Tomache Massarik
- SD Gundam G Generation World – Domon Kasshu, Yzak Joule, Tomache Massarik
- Sengoku Basara 3 – Ishida Mitsunari
- Sengoku Basara 4 – Ishida Mitsunari
- Skies of Arcadia – Vyse
- Skylanders series – (Japanese versions) Terrafin, Slam Bam
- Sly Cooper series (Japanese versions) – Sly Cooper
- Sonic & All-Stars Racing Transformed – Vyse
- Sonic Unleashed (Sonic the Werehog)
- Soulcalibur V – Ezio Auditore da Firenze
- Super Robot Wars Original Generation Saga Endless Frontier EXCEED – Aledy Nashe
- Super Robot Wars Z – Toshiya Dantou
- Steins;Gate – Hashida Itaru
- Street Fighter X Tekken – Yoshimitsu, Bryan Fury
- Xenosaga – Virgil
- Tales of Destiny – Stan Aileron
- Tales of Destiny 2 – Stan Aileron
- Tales of the World: Narikiri Dungeon 2 – Stan Aileron
- Tales of the World: Narikiri Dungeon 3 – Stan Aileron
- Tales of the World: Radiant Mythology – Stan Aileron
- Tales of the World: Radiant Mythology 2 – Stan Aileron
- Tales of the World: Radiant Mythology 3 – Stan Aileron
- Tales of VS – Stan Aileron
- Tengai Makyō: Daiyon no Mokushiroku – Raijin
- Tekken 4 – Yoshimitsu
- Tekken 5 – Yoshimitsu
- Tekken 5: Dark Resurrection – Yoshimitsu
- Tekken 6 – Yoshimitsu
- Tekken Tag Tournament 2 – Yoshimitsu
- Tekken 3D: Prime Edition – Yoshimitsu
- Tekken 7 – Yoshimitsu
- Tekken 8 – Yoshimitsu
- The Fallen Angels – Haiji Mibu
- The King of Fighters All Star – Dellons
- The Vision of Escaflowne – Van Fanel
- Tokyo Afterschool Summoners – Leib
- Viewtiful Joe: Red Hot Rumble – Joe
- Warriors Orochi 4 Ultimate – Hades
- Xenogears – Bart Fatima
- Zoids Vs. III – Arrow
- Valkyrie Connect – Thor
- Cytus 2 – Xenon

=== Tokusatsu ===
Year	Title	Role	Notes
1994	Blue SWAT	Kozuma	Episode 47
1995	Chouriki Sentai Ohranger	Prince Buldont/Kaizer Buldont	Eps 1-39 (Prince), 40-48 (Kaizer)
1996	Gekisou Sentai Carranger	HH Deo	Ep 19
1997	Denji Sentai Megaranger	Bibidebi	
1999	Ultra Seven Evolution	Tashiro (actor)/Alien Garut (voice)	Ep 3-5
1999	Voicelugger	Tomokazu Daichi/Voicelugger Emerald	As an actor
1999	Moero!! Robocon	Robopin	
2004	Tokusou Sentai Dekaranger	Germaian Baiz Gore	Ep 20
2006	Ultraman Mebius & Ultraman Brothers	Gaya	Movie
2006	Kamen Rider Kabuto: Hyper Battle Video	Kabuto Zecter	OV
2007	Kamen Rider Den-O	Anthopper Imagin Kirigiris (Ari Voiced by: Kōsuke Toriumi)	Ep 31-32
2009	Kamen Rider Decade: All Riders vs. Dai-Shocker	Kamen Rider Amazon, Ikadevil	Movie
2010	Ultraman Zero The Movie: Super Deciding Fight! The Belial Galactic Empire	Glen Fire	Movie
2011	Tensou Sentai Goseiger vs. Shinkenger: Epic on Ginmaku	Mobirates Voice	Movie
2011	Kaizoku Sentai Gokaiger	Narration, Gokaiger Equipment Voice, Greatest Treasure in the Universe Voice	
2011	Gokaiger Goseiger Super Sentai 199 Hero Great Battle	Narration, Gokaiger Equipment Voice, KiRanger, Red Falcon, DaiKenjin Zubaan	Movie
2011	Kaizoku Sentai Gokaiger The Movie: The Flying Ghost Ship	Narration, Gokaiger Equipment Voice	Movie
2011	OOO, Den-O, All Riders: Let's Go Kamen Riders	Ikadevil, Kamen Rider Amazon, Kamen Rider Stronger, Kikaider	Movie
2011	Ultra Zone	Husband (actor)/Alien Zarab (voice)	
2011	Ultraman Zero Side Story: Killer the Beatstar	Glen Fire	
2011	Ultraman Retsuden	Glen Fire	Ep 62–64, 79, 104
2011	Kaizoku Sentai Gokaiger: Let's Do This Goldenly! Roughly! 36 Round Gokai Change!!	Narration, Gokaiger Equipment Voice, Karizorg/Nyarizorg/Sugozorg	
2012	Kaizoku Sentai Gokaiger vs. Space Sheriff Gavan: The Movie	Narration, Gokaiger Equipment Voice, Voice of God	Movie
2012	Kamen Rider × Super Sentai: Super Hero Taisen	Kamen Rider Amazon, Kamen Rider Stronger, Akaranger, Koma Thunder, Gokaiger Equipment Voice, Narrator	Movie
2012	Unofficial Sentai Akibaranger	Tsukishima Alpaca, Asakusa Alpaca, Toei Security Guard	
2012	Ultra Zero Fight	Glen Fire	
2012	Space Sheriff Gavan: The Movie	Lizard Doubler	Movie
2013	Tokumei Sentai Go-Busters vs. Kaizoku Sentai Gokaiger: The Movie	Gokaiger Equipment Voice	Movie
2013	Kamen Rider × Super Sentai × Space Sheriff: Super Hero Taisen Z	Narration, Akaranger, Kamen Rider Amazon, Space Ikadevil, Gokaiger Equipment Voice	Movie
2013	Shin Ultraman Retsuden	Glen Fire (9, 11, 34, 100, 101, 104), Alien Icarus (10-13, 38, 51, 53, 90, 100)	
2013	Ultraman Ginga Theatre Special	Alien Icarus	Movie
2014	Ultraman Ginga EX	Alien Icarus	Movie
2014	Heisei Riders vs. Shōwa Riders: Kamen Rider Taisen feat. Super Sentai	Kamen Rider V3, Kamen Rider Amazon, Kamen Rider Stronger, Marshal Machine, The Generalissimo of Badan	Movie
2014	Ressha Sentai ToQger DVD	Kaniros	OV
2014	Ultraman Ginga S	Alien Icarus	Ep 16
2015	Shuriken Sentai Ninninger	Youkai Nekomata (ep 7–8), Yokai Mataneko (ep 26)	Ep 7–8, 26
2015	Kamen Rider Drive DVD	Spider-Type Roidmude 027/Fake Drive	OV
2015	Super Hero Taisen GP: Kamen Rider 3	Narration, Great Leader of Shocker/Rider Robo, Kamen Rider V3, Kamen Rider Amazon, Kamen Rider Stronger, Kamen Rider Super-1, Kamen Rider Double, Girizames, Shiomaneking, Turtle Bazooka, Marshal Machine	Movie
2015	Kamen Rider 4	Arimammoth	OV
2015	Ultraman X	Ikari (actor)/Alien Icarus Icary (Voice)	Ep 9
2015	Kamen Rider Ghost	Hero Parker Ghost (Musashi, Edison, Robin, Newton, Billy the Kid, Beethoven, Benkei, Goemon, Ryoma, Himiko, Tutankhamun, Nobunaga, Houdini, Grimm, Sanzo), Proto-Mega Ulorder voice, Ganma Ultima Eyecon voice	Eps 11-49
2016	Doubutsu Sentai Zyuohger	Shiomaneking (ep 7), Gokaiger Equipment Voice (ep 28 – 29)	
2016	Kamen Rider 1	Shiomaneking, Ganikomol, Poison Lizard Man	Movie
2016	Kamen Rider Heisei Generations: Dr. Pac-Man vs. Ex-Aid & Ghost with Legend Rider	Nobunaga Ghost	Movie
2017	Uchuu Sentai Kyuranger	Space Ikadevil	Ep 7
2017	Space Squad: Gavan vs. Dekaranger	Kuronen (Voice), Priest (Actor)	Movie
2017	Nichiyou mo Ametalk!	Baseball Masked, Space Ikadevil, Super Spider Man, Kamen Rider Amazon, Narration of At that time, a strange thing happened	Variety show
2017	Kamen Rider Heisei Generations Final: Build & Ex-Aid with Legend Rider	Musashi Ghost, Nobunaga Ghost, Grimm Ghost	Movie
2019	Super Sentai Strongest Battle	Gaisorg (ep 1 – 3), Akaranger (ep 2), Narration (ep 1 – 4)	Television special
2019	Kishiryu Sentai Ryusoulger	Equipment Voice, Gaisoulg (eps 12 – )	
2019	Drive Saga Kamen Rider Brain	Great Leader of 『Nothing』	OV
2020	Ultraman Z	Alien Barossa II (Voice)	Episode 17
2021	Kikai Sentai Zenkaiger	Geardalinger (Voice)	
2025	No.1 Sentai Gozyuger	Sekimoto Kazu (Actor)	Episode 26

=== Puppetry ===
- Sherlock Holmes (2014), Langdale Pike
- Thunderbolt Fantasy (2016–present), Betsu Ten Gai / Mie Tian Hai

=== Live-action films ===
- Laughing Under the Clouds (2018)
- Patalliro! (2019)
- Maku wo Orosuna! (2023)
- Acma:Game: The Final Key (2024), Servo (voice)
- Bayside Shakedown N.E.W. (2026), Deputy Superintendent-General

=== Live-action television ===
- Tokusatsu GaGaGa (2019), General Genka (voice)
- Tower of Justice (2021), Takafumi Makizono
- Voice II (2021)
- The 13 Lords of the Shogun (2022), Tsuchimikado Michichika
- Wing-man (2024), Dr. Lark
- Unbound (2025), Okumuraya Genroku
- The Scent of the Wind (2026), Kanji Mochizuki
- Vivant (2026) as a voice on the police radio (season 2 ep 11 (1))

=== Dubbing ===
==== Live-action ====
- Cha Tae-hyun
  - My Sassy Girl – Gyeon-woo
  - First Love Rally – Son Tae-il
  - My Girl and I – Kim Su-ho
  - My New Sassy Girl – Gyun-woo
  - Along with the Gods: The Two Worlds – Kim Ja-hong
- James McAvoy
  - The Chronicles of Narnia: The Lion, the Witch and the Wardrobe – Mr. Tumnus the Faun
  - Atonement – Robbie Turner
  - His Dark Materials – Lord Asriel Belacqua
- Oscar Isaac
  - Spider-Man: Into the Spider-Verse – Miguel O'Hara / Spider-Man 2099
  - Moon Knight – Marc Spector / Moon Knight, Steven Grant / Mr. Knight, and Jake Lockley
  - Spider-Man: Across the Spider-Verse – Miguel O'Hara / Spider-Man 2099
- Ant-Man and the Wasp – Sonny Burch (Walton Goggins)
- Back to the Future (2025 NTV edition) – Dave McFly (Marc McClure)
- Back to the Future Part II (2025 NTV edition) – Douglas J. Needles (Flea)
- Black Widow – Rick Mason (O-T Fagbenle)
- Bullet Train – Lemon (Brian Tyree Henry)
- Cloud Atlas – Adam Ewing / Poor Hotel Guest / Megan's Dad / Highlander / Hae-Joo Chang / Adam (Jim Sturgess)
- Digger – Ganesh (Riz Ahmed)
- Fatal Attraction (2021 Wowow edition) – Dan Gallagher (Michael Douglas) (additional recording)
- Flags of Our Fathers – Rene Gagnon (Jesse Bradford)
- Frankenstein's Army – Vassili (Andrei Zayats)
- From Dusk till Dawn: The Series – Seth Gecko (D. J. Cotrona)
- Get Smart (2011 TV Asahi edition) – Bruce (Masi Oka)
- The Great – Peter III of Russia (Nicholas Hoult)
- High School Musical series – Chad Danforth (Corbin Bleu)
- Jexi – Kai (Michael Peña)
- Jurassic World (2025 The Cinema edition) – Lowery Cruthers (Jake Johnson)
- A Life Less Ordinary – Robert Lewis (Ewan McGregor)
- Lords of Dogtown – Jay (Emile Hirsch)
- Lost & Found – Dylan Ramsey (David Spade)
- Lyle, Lyle, Crocodile – Mr. Primm (Scoot McNairy)
- Mars – Dr. Jay Johar (Akbar Kurtha)
- Powder – Jeremy "Powder" Reed (Sean Patrick Flanery)
- Quiz – Chris Tarrant (Michael Sheen)
- Rise of the Planet of the Apes – Dr. William "Will" Rodman (James Franco)
- Roman Holiday (2022 NTV edition) – Irving Radovich (Eddie Albert)
- That Thing You Do! – Jimmy Mattingly (Johnathon Schaech)
- The Smurfs 2 – Brainy Smurf (Fred Armisen)
- This Is the End – Jay Baruchel
- Transformers: Revenge of the Fallen – Skids (Tom Kenny)
- The Wedding Ringer – Doug Harris (Josh Gad)
- Wonka – Prodnose (Matt Lucas)

==== Animation ====
- Elio – Helix
- Encanto – Agustín Madrigal
- The Garfield Movie – Nolan
- Migration – Delroy
- Ron's Gone Wrong – Ron
- The Super Mario Bros. Movie – Toad
- The Super Mario Galaxy Movie – Toad
- Trolls World Tour – King Trollex
- VeggieTales – Larry the Cucumber

== TV roles ==
=== Series ===
- Wild Strawberry – Takeshi
