= Love Celeb =

Japanese manga series

- Cover of volume 1 featuring Gin

ラブセレブ (Rabu Serebu)
- Genre: Comedy; Erotica; Romance; Slice Of Life
- Manga
- Written by: Mayu Shinjo
- Published by: Shogakukan
- Magazine: Shōjo Comic
- Original run: May 1, 2004 – 2006
- Volumes: 7

Love Celeb (Japanese: ラブセレブ, Hepburn: Rabu Serebu) is a shōjo manga series created by Mayu Shinjo. Sakuya Ookochi, the main character from Sensual Phrase, also makes an appearance in this manga, as does Hakuron from the later spin-off Haou Airen.

== Story ==
Nakazono Kirara is an aspiring starlet. She once thought she would do whatever it took to get a starring role in a drama and have a CD. However, her manager Hanamaki proves her wrong when he sends her into a room full of horny producers to sleep her way into a role. Kirara wants no part of it as she is a virgin and the guys are intimidating, particularly the silver-haired one named Gin who appears to be in charge. Despite this, he lets her leave the party with his phone number and the situation takes an unexpected turn when Kirara suddenly becomes the most renowned new starlet, seemingly without any discernible reason.

== Characters ==
Kirara Nakazono
A 16-year-old aspiring singer-actress. Because of her lack of success, her manager, Hanamaki, tells her to sell her body to a person of authority, who happens to be Gin. Cheerful and clumsy, she has a talent for singing which is proven by Sakuya on his visit to Japan. She likes Gin but she's discouraged to tell him because of their status in life, eventually she tells him that she loves him. Voiced by: Ryoko Shintani

Ginzou "Gin" Fujiwara
Very influential in show business, said to be "the most powerful man in Japan". He is the grandson of a prime minister and the son of a rich businessman as well as a politician. He saves Kirara from being ravished by another guy, then afterwards almost ravishes her himself. He thinks that money can buy anything; even a person's heart. But when Kirara comes into his life, his viewpoint on people changes. He's an overly confident person and the only person who can boss him around is Sakuya. He seems to idolize him and want to be just like him someday. He does not understand his own feelings and sometimes wonders why he puts up with Kirara rather than going out with beautiful celebrities. He eventually comes to his senses and realizes his true feelings for Kirara. Voiced by: Tomokazu Seki

Hanamaki Ryoutaro
Kirara's manager. At first he tells Kirara to give her virginity up to Ginzou, but after learning that Ginzou is a "virgin killer" and that he loses interest in his conquests after having sex with them, he then tries to prevent Gin and Kirara from having sex. He gives Kirara sex lessons and punishes her for disobedience. He wants to have Kirara for himself in chapter 20 and when she says she wants to quit the business he says he won't hold back. He's been in love at first sight with Kirara. Voiced by: Ryoutarou Okiayu
Kouki Shirogane
a young actor who makes friends with Kirara caused Gin jealous. He was the highest rated actor in all of his productions and Kirara's partner in a drama.
Shin Takano
Shin was Gin's rival who takes Kirara as his lover but in the end he loses her to Gin.

Makoto Jingu
The son of a rich family who wants Kirara to become his lover and wants Gin's downfall. He is actually a nice guy who only wants to find a suitable bone-marrow donor for his love, Ruriko.
Ruriko
Makoto's lover who treated him as her older brother and suffered from leukemia and dreamed to marry Makoto.

== Media ==
=== Manga ===
The manga of Love Celeb was collected in seven bound volumes:

1. ISBN 4-09-138483-8 published on September 24, 2004
2. ISBN 4-09-138484-6 published on December 20, 2004
3. ISBN 4-09-138485-4 published on March 24, 2005
4. ISBN 4-09-138487-0 published on June 24, 2005
5. ISBN 4-09-138488-9 published on August 26, 2005
6. ISBN 4-09-138489-7 published on December 20, 2005
7. ISBN 4-09-130367-6 published on March 24, 2006

=== Drama CDs ===
Love Celeb was adapted as a series of three drama CDs:

1. Released on March 25, 2005
2. Released on July 22, 2005
3. Released on July 22, 2006
