= Ai Ore! =

Japanese manga series and film

- Cover of the first Japanese volume
- Genre: Romantic comedy
- Manga

Ai o Utau Yori Ore ni Oborero!
- Written by: Mayu Shinjo
- Published by: Shogakukan
- English publisher: AUS: Madman Entertainment; NA: Viz Media
- Magazine: Shōjo Comic
- Original run: 2006 – 2009
- Volumes: 5
- Manga

Ai-Ore! Danshikō no Hime to Joshikō no Ōji
- Written by: Mayu Shinjo
- Published by: Kadokawa Shoten
- English publisher: AUS: Madman Entertainment; NA: Viz Media
- Magazine: Monthly Asuka
- Original run: May 26, 2008 – December 24, 2010
- Volumes: 5
- Live-action film
- Directed by: Sakurako Fukuyama
- Written by: Junko Komura; Hisako Fujihira; Sakurako Fukuyama
- Released: August 25, 2012
- Runtime: 91 minutes

Ai Ore! (Japanese: 愛を歌うより俺に溺れろ!, Hepburn: Ai o Utau Yori Ore ni Oborero!; "Rather than Singing of Love, Drown in Me!") is a Japanese manga series by Mayu Shinjo. It was adapted into a live action film in 2012.

== Plot ==
=== Ai o Utau Yori Ore Ni Oborero! ===
Akira Shiraishi, a young high school boy with feminine features, joins Blaue Rosen, the all-female band for which Mizuki Sakurazaka, an androgynous girl of the same age, performs lead electric guitar.

Their high school life is anything but typical: Mizuki is the "prince" of her all-girl school while Akira is the "princess" of the neighboring all-boy school. A series of comical events brings them closer together, even as the prejudice of the people around them tries to pull them apart.

=== Ai-Ore! Danshikō no Hime to Joshikō no Ōji ===
After announcing that he is a boy during a concert for Blaue Rosen in the first book, Akira and Mizuki begin to date. But as their relationship heats up, so does the feud between the two's schools.

== Publication ==
Written and illustrated by Mayu Shinjo, Ai o Utau Yori Ore ni Oborero! was serialized in Shogakukan's Shōjo Comic magazine. Its chapters were compiled into five tankōbon volumes published from June 26, 2006, to July 26, 2007. A second series titled Ai Ore! – Love Me (愛俺! ～男子校の姫と女子校の王子～, Ai-Ore! Danshikō no Hime to Joshikō no Ōji) was serialized in Monthly Asuka by Kadokawa Shoten and was published into tankobon format between May 22, 2008, to February 22, 2011. As it published Ai Ore!, Kadokawa Shoten also republished the first series into three volumes from February 23 to April 22, 2010.

When translating into English Viz Media combined the two series, with the first series collected into the three first volumes and the second series compiled in the remaining five books. Its first volume was published on May 3, 2011, while the last one was released on February 5, 2013. Viz also published a digital edition from June 17, 2011, to March 8, 2013. The two series were also published in Australia by Madman Entertainment, in France by Pika Édition and in Germany by Egmont Manga & Anime.

=== Ai Ore! ===
==== Shogakukan version ====
No.	Japanese release date	Japanese ISBN
1	June 26, 2006	4091304702
2	November 26, 2006	4091305792
3	December 21, 2006	4091307388
4	April 26, 2007	9784091310248
5	July 26, 2007	9784091311368

==== Kadokawa Shoten and Viz Media version ====
No.	Original release date	Original ISBN	English release date	English ISBN
1	February 23, 2010	978-4-04-854437-5	May 3, 2011	978-1421538389
2	March 19, 2010	978-4-04-854446-7	August 2, 2011	978-1421538396
3	April 22, 2011	978-4-04-854469-6	November 1, 2011	978-1421538402

=== Ai Ore! – Love Me ===
No.	Original release date	Original ISBN	English release date	English ISBN
1 (4)	May 22, 2008	978-4-04-854176-3	February 7, 2012	978-1421538730
2 (5)	August 22, 2008	978-4-04-854229-6	May 1, 2012	978-1421538747
3 (6)	February 23, 2009	978-4-04-854289-0	August 7, 2012	978-1421538754
4 (7)	February 23, 2010	978-4-04-854438-2	November 6, 2012	978-1421538761
5 (8)	February 24, 2011	978-4-04-854592-1	February 5, 2013	978-1421541990

== Anime ==
Along with the official announcement for the live-action film, Shinjo Mayu revealed that the manga was supposed to have an anime adaptation but was canceled due to unfortunate events.

== Live-action ==
A live-action film adaptation, that would premier at the end of 2011, was first announced by Mayu Shinjo through her blog in July 2011. In January 2012, it was revealed that idol Karam from the K-pop band DGNA and actress Ito Ohno would star it. The film opened on August 25, 2012, and 2,000 copies of a "special mini-comic" by Shinjo herself were distributed. The film is directed by Sakurako Fukuyama and its main theme is "Ikenai 1-2-3" by DGNA.

=== Cast ===
- Karam as Akira Shiraishi
- Ito Ohno Mizuki Sakurazaka
- Yuta Furukawa as Ran Nikaidou
- Takuya Terada as Rui Kiryuuin
- Akira as Kaoru Naruse
- Shuto Yoshiwara as Ai Okita
- Haruka Kawamura as Momoko Kidera
- Kavka Shishido as Megumi Yusa

== Reception ==
Volumes 1, 2, 4, and 5 from the English publication of the series have been featuring in lists of 10 best-selling manga rankings such as The New York Times.
