= Akuma na Eros =

Japanese manga series

- Cover of the first volume of the tankōbon edition

悪魔なエロス (Akuma na Eroo)
- Genre: Comedy, Romance, Supernatural
- Manga
- Written by: Mayu Shinjo
- Published by: Shogakukan
- Magazine: Shōjo Comic
- Original run: May 26, 2001 – March 26, 2002
- Volumes: 4

Akuma na Eros (悪魔なエロス; lit. 'The Evil Eros'), also known as Virgin Crisis, is a Japanese shōjo manga series by Mayu Shinjo. It was serialized in 17 chapters by Shogakukan in the biweekly manga magazine Shōjo Comic in 2001, and collected in four tankōbon volumes. It depicts the romance between a high-school girl, Miu, and Satan.

== Plot ==
Akuma na Eros is focused on Miu Sakurai, a high-school girl who is in love with her classmate, Shion Amamiya. Miu summons Satan through a book and wishes for Amamiya to fall in love with her, but Satan demands her virginity as the price. Satan's spell fails because Amamiya is Christian. Therefore, he uses his powers to disguise himself as Miu's elder brother named "Kai", and his crow familiar, Malphas, into a younger brother named Tsubasa. Satan demands her virginity on the day of Amamiya's love confession to Miu, but along the way Miu develops feelings for Satan.

After Amamiya confesses, Miu heads to the church where Satan attempts to take her virginity. Amamiya, appears at the church and impales Satan with a sword, revealing himself as the archangel Michael. Michael and Satan battle in the church, and Satan is wounded. Michael prepares to send Satan back to Hell, but as he collapses he promises to take Miu's heart with him and tells her that he loves her. Miu runs to Satan and wishes for him to stay by her side, and Satan agrees in return for her eternal love. Michael admits defeat as he can not fight true love. Alone again, Satan reverts to his human form to claim Miu, but she faints from the excitement before he could take her virginity.

Satan assumes a new identity, but Michael summons Sarah, a half angel-half demon, and informs her of Satan's love of a human woman. Sarah summons Satan back to hell, and Satan takes Miu to Hell with him. Miu runs away after learning of the sexual relationship between Satan and Serah. Satan rejects Sarah and forces Miu to return where he claims her virginity repeatedly. Satan and Miu return to Earth, but a jealous Sarah drives a wedge between them. Michael consoles Miu and a watchful Satan takes this to be infidelity and demands sex in front of a gathering of demons. During sex, Miu swears she did not betray his love and Satan dismisses the gathering to take her privately.

Satan asks Miu to become his wife and to live with him in Hell, but it requires her to first die. He returns her to her room to think about it. Uncertain if she wants to leave her family and friends, she finds herself at the bookstore where she bought the magic book and learns that the book had been waiting for her and her meeting with Satan was fated. Miu runs out of the store to find Kai, but iron beam falls from above and kill her. Michael, having realized Sarah was behind it, arrives to find Death ready to take Miu's soul to the realm of the dead, where neither angel nor devil could reach her. He refuses to allow her soul to be taken, and uses his powers to disperse Death. Satan discovers people have now forgotten himself, Miu and Amamiya, as Michael erases Miu's and those she knew memories and takes her to Heaven to spend eternity with him.

After killing Sarah for killing Miu, Satan goes to Heaven to retrieve her. Though Michael attempts to woo her, Miu can't accept him. Satan arrives and as he and Michael battle, Miu's memories return and she runs to a badly injured Satan, growing wings of her own, she covers him. Michael opens the way back to Hell and accepts that Miu will only be happy with Satan. When Miu yells good-bye to Michael, she calls him by his human name "Shion", Michael says good-bye to himself for Miu and says that she was his angel. At the end of the series, Miu leaves her life behind and joins Satan in Hell where she becomes his wife.

== Manga ==
Akuma na Eros was written and illustrated by Mayu Shinjo. It was serialized by Shogakukan in the biweekly shōjo manga magazine Shōjo Comic in 2001, starting in the double issue 3&4 and running until issue 24. The 17 chapters were collected in four tankōbon volumes. It was republished in two bunkoban volumes on February 15, 2006.

No.	Release date	ISBN
1	May 26, 2001	4-09-136753-4
2	August 23, 2001	4-09-136754-2
3	November 26, 2001	4-09-136755-0
4	March 26, 2002	4-09-136756-9

The series is licensed in Spain and Argentina by Editorial Ivrea, in Germany by Egmont Manga & Anime, and in Italy by Star Comics. All three editions are published with the title Virgin Crisis.
