= Demon Love Spell =

Japanese manga series

- North American cover for the first manga volume

あやかし恋絵巻 (Ayakashi Koi Emaki)
- Genre: Comedy, romance
- Manga
- Written by: Mayu Shinjo
- Published by: Shueisha
- English publisher: NA: Viz Media
- Magazine: Margaret
- Original run: 2008 – 2014
- Volumes: 6

Demon Love Spell (Japanese: あやかし恋絵巻, Hepburn: Ayakashi Koi Emaki) is a manga series by Mayu Shinjo about a shrine maiden that finds herself falling for a demon that feeds on passion and love. Shinjo initially wrote Demon Love Spell in 2008 as a two part installment manga for Margaret magazine, but chose to serialize the series in 2009 due to the story's popularity. In 2012 Viz Media licensed the manga with the intention to publish it in English through their Shojo Beat imprint and released the first volume in December of that same year.

== Synopsis ==
The series follows Miko, a young shrine maiden living with her family. She's frustrated that she's unable to contribute much to the family business, as she has little apparent supernatural abilities and cannot easily see or banish spirits. Miko eventually runs into Kagura, an incubus that has been feeding on the female students at Miko's school. She manages to seal him, but in the process turns him into a chibi, lower powered version of himself. Miko initially tries to keep him secret from her family, but they inevitably discover Kagura but allow him to remain with Miko due to his small size. Meanwhile, Kagura has shown the ability to enter Miko's mind while she's sleeping, where he is able to assume his full size. Kagura uses this as an opportunity to attempt to seduce Miko, with some success.

== Characters ==
Miko Tsubaki (椿 美依子, Tsubaki Miko)
Voiced by: Saori Hayami (vomic)
Kagura (神楽)
Voiced by: Kazuya Nakai, Kōki Miyata (young) (vomic)

== Reception ==
Critical reception for the series has been mostly positive, with the School Library Journal commenting that for the story material the manga was "quite clean, consisting mostly of cheeky innuendos and a few abstract dream sequences in which sex is insinuated but not graphically depicted". Anime News Network gave overall positive reviews for the first two volumes, praising the series' artwork and remarking that Miko was a stronger female character than some of the ones Shinjo had written in the past. In contrast, U-T San Diego reported that a San Diego Comic-Con panel had named the manga one of their five worst manga releases for 2013.

== Volumes ==
No.	Original release date	Original ISBN	English release date	English ISBN
1	May 25, 2009	978-4-08-846403-9	December 4, 2012	142154945X
2	November 25, 2009	978-4-08-846465-7	March 5, 2013	1421550776
3	July 23, 2010	978-4-08-846546-3	June 4, 2013	142155366X
4	July 25, 2011	978-4-08-846671-2	September 3, 2013	1421553651
5	August 24, 2012	978-4-08-846816-7	December 3, 2013	1421553740
6	August 23, 2013	978-4-08-845080-3	July 1, 2014	1421569477
