= Kagura people =

The Kagura are an ethnic and linguistic group based in Tanzania.
