= Sensual Phrase =

Japanese manga series and its adaptations

- Cover of Volume 1 of Viz Media's English release of Sensual Phrase

快感 フレーズ (Kaikan Phrase)
- Genre: Drama, romance
- Manga
- Written by: Mayu Shinjo
- Published by: Shogakukan
- English publisher: NA: Viz Media
- Magazine: Shōjo Comic
- Original run: 1997 – 2000
- Volumes: 18
- Anime television series
- Directed by: Hiroko Tokita
- Written by: Katsuhiko Koide; Michihiro Tsuchiya; Reiko Yoshida
- Music by: Cher Watanabe (eps. 12-44); Kan Sawada; Ken Morioka
- Studio: Studio Hibari
- Original network: TV Tokyo
- Original run: April 20, 1999 – March 25, 2000
- Episodes: 44

Sensual Phrase (Japanese: 快感 フレーズ, Hepburn: Kaikan Furēzu) is a Japanese manga series written and illustrated by Mayu Shinjo. The manga was published by Shogakukan in Shōjo Comic between 1997 and 2000, and collected in 18 bound volumes. It was adapted as a 44-episode anime television series by Studio Hibari, and as a series of novels. The series tells the story of Aine Yukimura, a high school student who becomes the lyricist for a Japanese rock band, and her relationship with the band's lead singer, Sakuya Ookochi.

To promote the anime, a real-life band was formed: Λucifer, the band the story focuses on. The rival band, e.MU, seems to have been active before the manga was created. Both bands continued after the anime ended before disbanding. In the series, Λucifer's original name is Lucifer, changed to Λucifer (using the Greek letter lambda) when the band decides to go international. For the purposes of the article this second name, Λucifer, is used. Japanese names are given in Western order, with family name last.

== Plot ==
Yukimura Aine is a seventeen-year-old high school student who writes sensual song lyrics and hopes to become a songwriter. One day, two school friends talk her into entering her best lyrics into a contest. When someone bumps into her in the street, she drops her lyrics and is almost run over by a passing car. It is driven by Sakuya Ookochi, lead singer of the hard rock band Lucifer, which is known for its sensual lyrics. Aine does not know who he is but falls in love. He makes sure she is not hurt, and gives her an all-access pass to that night's show. After she leaves, he finds her lyrics and takes them back to the band with a plan in mind.

That night, Aine listens from the back of the audience. As she turns to leave, she hears Sakuya singing her lyrics. She runs to the stage to see if he is the driver of the car. She is swept off her feet. At first, people tell her Sakuya is never serious about women, and she thinks he might be toying with her. Later, he kidnaps her and convinces her to become the band's lyricist, and she thinks he is playing with her but for business reasons, not romance. Sakuya then transfers to Aine's high school, wanting to protect and work with her. Initially, he sees her as an innocent he can tease, but his feelings for her soon grow. Seeing her talent, and wanting to win the girl, Sakuya campaigns for Aine to become the band's official lyricist. His manager initially objects but relents upon seeing the continued excellence of Aine's lyrics. She becomes their lyricist, using the male pseudonym Yukihiko Aine to protect her identity and the band's image.

Aine and Sakuya's relationship gets off to a rocky start when they do not communicate their real feelings. Aine tries to hide her feelings for Sakuya, thinking he sees the two of them only as co-workers. She believes he wants to preserve her virginal imagination so that she will continue to write hit songs for the band. This seems confirmed when he rejects her advances. Although Sakuya is not subtle by nature, he attempts to express his feelings for her by writing a ballad called "Little Bird" or "Love Melody", but she continues to misunderstand. Finally, after filming the music video "Drug", he corners her and confesses his feelings.

But beginning a romance and being the girlfriend of a high-profile star is not easy. As the series progresses, Aine finds herself the frequent target of Sakuya's enemies, including rival bands and obsessed fans.

Ralph Grazer, Sakuya's older half-brother, is an American media mogul who heads a business empire in the United States and is branching into Asian markets. Ralph has a grudge against Sakuya, whom he has never met although their father has pushed them to make contact. Ralph goes to Japan and uses blackmail to force Aine to break up with Sakuya and work for him instead. Sakuya takes time out from the band to confront his biological father, the man had who had raped his mother. Sakuya travels to America to learn the family business, which gives him the knowledge and power to take Ralph's position as head of the media corporation. Sakuya returns to Japan and forces Ralph to sign a contract under which he will recover his position in return for releasing Aine. Ralph, used to getting whatever and whomever he wants, is confused by this tactic and by Sakuya's love for Aine. He returns to the United States to start over and relearn from their father. Ralph returns twice more in the manga, but no longer necessarily as Sakuya's enemy.

Lucifer continues to grow, becoming a major hit. Renamed Λucifer, the band prepares to tour America and Europe. Sakuya and Aine attempt to balance their love and professional lives. Aine's feelings for Sakuya and her ability to write lyrics are tested. The band hires Hitoshi Takayama as a producer to prepare for international fame. At first, Hitoshi thinks Aine is nothing more than an outspoken groupie, with no place on band premises or in Sakuya's life. But as he gets to know her he falls in love, hiding his feelings by pretending to be homosexual. As Hitoshi plans the band's six-month move to England to set the stage for capturing European fans, he attempts to break up both Sakuya and Aine's relationship and another couple, one of the band's guitarists, Atsuro, and his girlfriend Yuuka. Yuki, the band leader, and another guitarist, soon put a stop to this plan, letting Takayama know that band members owe their success to their families and lovers.

Kaito Yoshioka, president of a rival label, resents Λucifer's success. He decides to use Aine to break up the band and brutally rapes her in an attempt to break Sakuya. A guilt-ridden Hitoshi finds Aine and takes her to his home to try to comfort her, helping her avoid Sakuya out of shame, self-loathing, and fear of being rejected. When Aine tries to commit suicide that night, Takayama tells Sakuya. Devastated, Sakuya loses his voice along with the desire to sing and leaves the band. Yuki realizes that the only way to protect the entire band is to sign with Sakuya's half-brother Ralph's label, taking the band international. Meanwhile, Sakuya tries to kill Yoshioka, but Ralph stops him. He reminds Sakuya that Aine needs him to be with her, not in prison. Ralph avenges Aine by having Yoshioka investigated for tax evasion and fraud, which destroys his company.

Aine is in a near-catatonic state, and Sakuya takes her into hiding to care for her. When she again attempts suicide, he cuts his own wrist telling her he will die with her if that is what she really wants. Aine snaps out of her depression and begins to heal emotionally, even confronting and threatening Yoshioka to never bother Aucifer ever again. Takayama finds Sakuya, and with Yuki makes several attempts to persuade Sakuya to return to the band. Aine realizes that Sakuya is avoiding music and is afraid that she will be hurt again because of him. She convinces him to return to the world they both love. Takayama's death in a car accident traumatizes and pushes Sakuya to rejoin the band and sign the contract. Ralph tells Sakuya that, when he takes over from their father, he wants Sakuya to head the company's media business. Sakuya refuses, saying he would rather be a producer. After Takayama's death, Λucifer performs its final concert in Japan before moving to New York City. While they are overseas, Aine studies to take Takayama's place and become a producer. At the end of the series, Sakuya and Aine are married with a son. ~ See one-shot of Atsuro and Yuuka's wedding, and one-shot 'King Egoist' in Love Celeb for the announcement of Sakuya and Aine's second child ~

== Characters ==
=== Aine ===
Aine Yukimura (雪村 愛音, Yukimura Aine)
Voiced by: Atsuko Enomoto
The main female protagonist of the series, Aine is a shy but innocent high school girl who does not know how to hide her feelings. Her home life is rocky, her parents seem to ignore her, and she is mostly left to her own devices. Hurt by this emotional neglect and lacking confidence in herself, she clings to and relies on Sakuya to protect and defend her and feels guilty about her inexperience and doubts. When Sakuya tells her parents that Aine will be living with him, they realize they are losing their daughter to a dangerous world. Sakuya eventually convinces Aine's father that he loves her and will protect her, so they can live together. Aine has to fight to find her own place within the record label, and prove herself repeatedly. She comes to be seen as important to Sakuya's emotional wellbeing and to the band and earns her place with her innovative concepts and her lyrics. Towards the series end, following her rape, recovery, and the death of her friend, band producer Hitoshi Takayama, she grows up, matures, and becomes stronger for herself, Sakuya and others.

=== Λucifer ===
Sakuya Ookochi (大河内 咲也, Ōkochi Sakuya)
Voiced by: Masaya Matsukaze
The main character of the series, Sakuya is the highly talented lead singer of Λucifer. Seventeen and still in high school, he is also the band's youngest member. He transfers to Aine's high school to get closer to her. While he respects and trusts Yuki, the only other band member he is close to is Atsuro. He is known for his striking blue eyes, inherited from his American father. Sakuya is also rude, physical, and does not care about life, even when he begins to sing with the band Lucifer. Sakuya has spent most of his young teenage years paying off his mother's debt at the club where she worked. Like his mother, he sang and played the piano for club guests. But to make more money, he also worked as a male escort prostitute on the side. He was able to do this because he appears older than his years. His harsh childhood experiences have caused Sakuya to lose trust in people. But when he meets high school girl Aine, he shows a new caring and sensitive attitude towards others, especially to Aine. When she first starts working for them he tells himself that he is selfishly using her, but before long his true feelings emerge. ~ See Sakuya's one-shot and Vol. 10, Lucifer's Legend. Sakuya also makes an appearance in "Love Celeb" as Kirara's producer.
Yukifumi ("Yuki") Todo (藤堂 雪文, Todo Yukifumi)
Voiced by: Shinichiro Miki
Yuki is the leader of the band Λucifer and one of its guitarists. He is the one who stands up to management for the best interests of Lucifer and his bandmates. In the anime only, Yuki is Santa's old friend and a co-founder of the band. He has the strongest sense of leadership and responsibility. In the manga, Yuki is the sole founder of Lucifer, who scouted Bi-Jazz band members Towa and Atsuro. ~ See one-shot on Towa and Vol. 10, Lucifer's Legend ~ It is often Yuki who knocks sense into Sakuya – sometimes almost too literally – when Sakuya's uncontrolled feelings blind him to Aine's hurt and pain, or his bandmates' exasperation. Yuki is the eldest son of a famous traditional Noh theater family, and must choose between the band and his family when he tells his father he wants to give up Noh and concentrate on the band. His father disowns him, but in a later episode of the anime series the two have a friendly relationship. In the manga, although he returns to Noh theater after Lucifer officially disbands, Yuki's relationship with his parents is not mentioned after Marriage Phrase, Vol. 6. Yuki is in an arranged marriage with Maria, also from a Noh theater family, and they have a child. Maria was in love with him but felt he treated her like a little sister. When eventually Maria finds out about Lucifer, she sneaks out with him to watch the band rehearse. Yuki's attitude changes when Sakuya makes advances to her. Maria supports his decision to be a guitarist in a band, but when Yuki's father disowns him he briefly divorces her, unsure of his ability to take care of a wife at that time. He begs her to remarry him when the band signs its first contract.
Yoshihiko ("Santa") Nagai (永井良彦, Nagai Yoshihiko)
Voiced by: Takahiro Sakurai
Λucifer's drummer Santa's nickname comes from his birth date, Christmas Day. Santa is easy-going but boisterous. In the anime only, along with his girlfriend Yumi he is a former member of the band Climb. He breaks up the band by leaving and joining Lucifer when Yumi cheats on him. Santa comes from a large family, loves ramen and beer, and has a tendency to put his foot in his mouth at the worst times. It is through Santa that Lucifer guitarist Yuki meets Sakuya. Other details of Santa's background are little known compared to his bandmates. He is the only one still single at the end of the series. In the manga (Vol. 10, Lucifer's Legend), Santa was the drummer in a heavy metal band called Shinigami. Yuki knocks him against a wall, angry to be taken for a woman, when Santa makes a pass at him when they first meet to discuss Santa joining Lucifer. Santa then agrees to a session.
Kazuto ("Towa") Sakuma (佐久間和斗, Sakuma Kazuto)
Voiced by: Susumu Chiba
Nicknamed "Towa", he is Λucifer's bass guitarist. He is enigmatic and does not joke around a lot. While he is not shy, he can be quiet and secretive. Towa and Atsuro are best friends from high school. They joined the band Bi-Jazz together. Much to his dislike, Towa's androgynous good looks mean not only women but also men swoon over him. His parents wanted a girl and so raised him as a girl for the first few years of his life. Cursed with fair, wavy hair and an effeminate beauty, and an inability to tan, Towa's looks blur gender perception boundaries so much that some people ignore his natural gender and do not consider him a man. His high school bane was receiving declarations of love from other boys, which Atsuro would tease him about. Although irked at first, Towa decides to use his beauty as a shield. The only person to whom he reveals his true self is his childhood friend and current girlfriend, Miya, who is Λucifer's official makeup artist. They grew up together and know each other so well he was afraid she would see him as a girlfriend not a man. Miya herself is something of a tomboy, and considers herself rather plain. She and Towa complement each other. Where she sees him as fully a man, he sees her as fully a woman.
Atsuro Kiryuu (桐生 敦郎, Kiryū Atsuro)
Voiced by: Kenichi Suzumura
Atsuro is one of Λucifer's two guitarists. As the band's friendliest and most cheerful member, he serves as the comic relief. Atsuro's long-time girlfriend, Yuuka, is actually his stepsister, and he desperately tries to keep their relationship a secret from their parents, the media, and even his bandmates. Their biggest obstacle is that they are registered as siblings, and so face the possibility that they cannot marry. Shinjo never fully explains the legal complications, even in the one-shot in which Atsuro and Yuuka get married in the United States without their parents' blessing. Aine is the first person to find out about Atsuro and Yuuka. She tells Atsuro she will keep their secret, even though the paparazzi see him with Aine and mistakenly report that Atsuro is having an affair with Sakuya's girlfriend. This causes Sakuya and Atsuro to fight, until Yuuka announces to the band that she is in love with Atsuro. The band members, except Sakuya, reveal that they had suspected this all along. By the end, Atsuro and Yuuka make a conscious decision to be together even if their parents object, and to be open about their relationship to the public.

== Production ==
In her blog, Shinjo noted that though she was the actual creator of Sensual Phrase, she was one of the last to know that the series would be adapted into an anime, and that by the time she knew, Shogakukan had already made the decision to do the series. She was also unaware that there were talks about a film adaptation of the series until two years after the proposal was rejected. When the anime was rerun on AT-X, she learnt of this through the channel's official website. She left Shogakukan in 2007, despite the company's threat to take all of her earlier series, including Sensual Phrase, out of print if she did so. Shinjo contacted a lawyer, and the threat was never carried out.

== Media ==
=== Manga ===
Written and illustrated by Mayu Shinjo, Sensual Phrase premiered in Shōjo Comic in 1997, where it was serialized monthly until its conclusion in 2000. The individual chapters were collected and published in 17 tankōbon volumes by Shogakukan from June 1997 through January 2001. An additional volume was released on April 24, 2003, containing a sequel chapter to the story and additional unrelated short stories. Shogakukan republished the serialized chapters across six shinsoban hard cover editions in 2003, and re-released the original 17 volumes in 2006 with new covers.

Sensual Phrase is licensed for English-language release in North America by Viz Media, including the special final volume. Viz Media published the first volume of the series on March 24, 2004; the final volume was released on February 13, 2007.

The series is licensed for regional language publication by Editorial Ivréa in Spain and Latin America, Pika Edition in France, Egmont Manga & Anime in Germany, and Star Comics in Italy. It was serialized in Germany in Manga Twister, and in Italy in Amici.

=== Light novels ===
Five novels based on the manga were published by Shogakukan:

- 90-nichi no Densetsu, published December 1, 1999 (ISBN 4-09-421241-8)
- Hong Kong Kyoushikyoku, published July 25, 2000 (ISBN 4-09-421242-6)
- Ao no Meikyu, published November 26, 2001 (ISBN 4-09-421243-4)
- Owarinaki Shinwa, published February 2001 (ISBN 4-09-421244-2)
- Engage Song, published June 3, 2003 (ISBN 4-09-421245-0)

=== Anime ===
Sensual Phrase was adapted as an anime television series by Studio Hibari. It was directed by Hiroko Tokita, with music by Susumu Akitagawa and character designs by Yumi Nakayama. There were multiple opening and closing theme tunes, some of them credited to fictional bands Λucifer and e.MU, for which real-world counterparts were created. The anime was broadcast on TV Tokyo in 44 episodes from April 20, 1999, to March 25, 2000. It was later released on 11 videos by Pony Canyon.

==== Episode list ====
No.	Title	Original release date
1	"Misty Blue" (ミスティ・ブルー)	April 20, 1999
Sakuya starts singing in a hotel lounge and attracts many female guests. A woman pursues him. Yuki (guitar) and Santa (drums) are members of the band Climb until Santa sees his girlfriend Yumi, the lead vocalist, canoodling with another band member. Yuki and Santa decide to leave Climb to create a better band. A female friend Yuki meets at Sakuya's hotel suggests Sakuya as singer. Yuki and Santa are interested in Towa, bassist with the band Neon, and ask him to join but he hesitates and leaves. Yuki decides on a name for the new band: Lucifer, the fallen angel.
2	"Jam" (ジャム)	April 27, 1999
Yuki and Santa ask Sakuya to join their band. He says no. Yuki gives Sakuya a Mini Disc. Atsuro wants to play new live shows with his student band, Lucy Lane, but its members have school and work commitments. Sakuya meets the woman from the hotel regularly. The band Neon gets the chance to launch its debut record, but Towa leaves as the record company is only interested in their looks. Yuki and Santa meet Sakuya and want to play live together at the Cradle. Sakuya arrogantly refuses. Yuki meets him again that evening, and gets angry as Sakuya sees this as a small-time project, not as a dream. Independently of each other, Atsuro, his sister, and Towa decide to go to the Cradle. As Yuki and Santa start playing onstage at the Cradle, they see Sakuya drop by, and announce him as their singer. Together they begin their song and Atsuro and Towa join in. Both decide to join the band, but Sakuya says no again.
3	"Into The Wind" (イントゥ・ザ・ウィンド)	May 4, 1999
Atsuro, Towa, Yuki and Santa try to convince Sakuya, but fail. Kudo from the band Radical offers Sakuya a lead singer role. Sakuya is interested, as they are professionals and the band is going to release a debut record. He accepts, but says that he is expensive. Yuki has difficulties at Noh drama rehearsal, and his father criticizes his music hobby. The Lucifer band members keep trying to persuade Sakuya to no avail, and decide to search for a different singer. They meet to rehearse. Suddenly Sakuya appears and agrees to be lead vocalist.
4	"Time Up" (タイムアップ)	May 11, 1999
Lucifer plays live shows and attracts many fans. Atsuro's sister Yuuka accompanies them most of the time and helps with promotion and ticket sales. Sakuya is still singing at the hotel and meeting up with the woman. Lucifer rehearses and works hard, but Sakuya remains a loner. He likes to be a band member, but nothing more. The other members are afraid he will leave if he is pushed too hard. Sakuya meets the woman from the hotel by chance, but when he tries to leave because Lucifer has a live concert the woman will not let him go. The band members are kept waiting.
5	"Day By Day" (デイ・バイ・デイ)	May 18, 1999
Sakuya has stood Lucifer up. The band continues its rehearsals, but morale is low because Sakuya says he does not care about the other members' dreams. He meets the woman again, but her husband arrives and Sakuya leaves. That evening, the husband appears and warns him never to meet his wife again. Yuuka sees Sakuya ignore this warning, and tells him Lucifer needs him and his voice. Her enthusiasm makes him think twice. Later, Yuki talks to him too, saying he had never considered what Sakuya wanted but that now he hopes his own dream will become Sakuya's dream too. Finally, Sakuya is attacked by the husband, who says Sakuya is pathetic and has no hopes and dreams.
6	"Cradle" (クレイドル)	May 25, 1999
The Cradle is to close, and Lucifer is in disbelief. It is Lucifer's birthplace, where they played their first session. Sakuya alone seems indifferent. He refuses to meet with the woman, as he has something to do. The other band members assemble at the Cradle; Sakuya shows up eventually. They are all depressed, so they start to invite people to the live house to save it. The Cradle is full the next time it opens, but this is not enough to save it. Lucifer suggests a farewell live show, and even Sakuya agrees. At home, he ignores the woman's phone call.
7	"Farewell Live" (フェアウェル・ライブ)	June 1, 1999
Everyone helps to decorate the Cradle for the farewell live show. Sakuya disappears to meet the woman in order to break up with her. The Cradle's final night is wonderful. The woman appears, and drinks too much. During Lucifer's gig, she lets a bottle fall from the table, which breaks the mood. He drags her outside and takes her home. Everyone notices that Sakuya is changing.
8	"The End" (ジ・エンド)	June 15, 1999
Sakuya starts a fight in the middle of their live performance when he hears someone insult Lucifer. The other band members get involved, and everyone is arrested. Atsuro and Yuki's father bails them out. As the Todo family heir, Yuki has responsibilities and must distance himself from the band to focus on his Noh rehearsals. Atsuro must study for exams. Santa discovers that his ex-girlfriend, Yumi, has already released a debut record. The band returns to the live club to apologize, but is banned. Yuuka tries to find another live venue, but now no one wants Lucifer. Atsuro wants everyone to look for a place to play but Sakuya refuses, and Santa blames him for their troubles. Sakuya declares that he will leave the band.
9	"On The Street" (オン ザ ストリート)	June 22, 1999
Towa, Atsuro, Yuki and Yuuka are still trying to find a place to play. Santa visits Sakuya at the hotel to apologize, but Sakuya sticks to his decision. When Yuuka hears that Sakuya went to the live club to apologize, she realizes Sakuya cares about the band. Sakuya thinks it is his fault that Lucifer was banned from playing live. Yuki's father does not like Yuki spending so much with his band again, and decides on nighttime Noh rehearsals. Atsuro wonders whether he should risk leaving school to be in the band. Yuki finds Sakuya singing in the park.
10	"One From The Heart" (ワン・フロム・ザ・ハート)	June 29, 1999
Yuki tells the other band members about Sakuya's street performance, and that he thinks Sakuya loves the band, but cannot persuade the others to call him back. Yuuka suggests entering a contest, but Santa is not interested because they have no singer. They arrange to meet in the park to talk to Sakuya. Santa does not come and Sakuya arrives quite late. They discuss the contest but Sakuya leaves, saying he will do as he pleases. Atsuro decides not to enter college. Santa passes by the park and hears Sakuya sing. Sakuya tells Santa he is writing a song and wants to play it with everyone.
11	"Some Day" (サム・デイ)	July 13, 1999
Sakuya finishes his song and Yuuka rents a studio. Lucifer decides to use the song for the contest. In front of his parents, Atsuro pretends to study for his exams. He wants to talk to Towa, who left his family for music. Santa receives a CD, his ex-girlfriend's debut album. Yumi phones to ask about the CD and tells Santa she has broken up with her friend. Sakuya calls his new song "Datenshi Blue", and Lucifer plays it in the park before the contest. Atsuro tells his parents he will not go to college, and wants to become a professional musician. His father disapproves and orders him out of his house. Atsuro asks Towa if he can stay with him.
12	"Step One" (ステップ・ワン)	July 20, 1999
Atsuro turns up with his hair dyed red, making the others laugh. It symbolizes his determination. Yuuka posts the competition entry, and everyone waits for a return letter addressed to Towa. Sakuya is sure Lucifer will reach the top one day. Atsuro collects the mail, but it is only junk and he throws it out. Dressed as a delivery boy, Atsuro delivers a pizza to his parents' home. When they see his red hair they start to fight again. The band members anxiously wait for mail. Atsuro kicks the trash bin: he has bet his future on Lucifer. Towa picks up the spilled papers, and finds the overlooked competition invitation. The Tokyo contest is to be held on the Sunday week, but Yuki's father says Yuki must accompany him to a week-long Noh conference in Kyoto, finishing that Sunday.
13	"Rainy Express" (レイニー・エクスプレス)	July 27, 1999
Yuki has difficulties playing the guitar like Atsuro. Santa knows it is because Yuki is his family's only heir, but Yuki keeps the whole truth a secret. Santa believes Yuki should be their band leader, because he can hold the band together. Sakuya meets the former owner of the Cradle, who intends to reopen the club one day when Lucifer is famous. Atsuro invites his parents to the contest, but again fights with his father. Yuki wants to participate in the contest but his father objects, saying Yuki will have to tear apart the Noh fan he has used from childhood. Yuki tells the band he is going to Kyoko. Rather than give up, the band tries to adapt the song for a four-man arrangement.
14	"Grand Prix" (グラン・プリ)	August 3, 1999
Lucifer is the final band due to perform in the contest. Their mood is low because Yuki is not there. Atsuro's guitar part has changed the most in the new arrangement. He tries his best, but plays badly in the last rehearsal. Everyone is anxious. Yuki performs perfectly in the Noh drama, but later shows his father the torn fan. His father casts him out and Yuki leaves immediately for Tokyo. It is Lucifer's turn. Yuki arrives at the last minute. Yuuka has urged her parents to come and see Atsuro play. They see his lively performance and forgive him. Yuki holds the band together and Lucifer puts in a great performance, but places only second. Sakuya does not want to give up: it would hurt his pride.
15	"Magical Mystery Tour" (マジカル・ミステリー・ツアー)	August 10, 1999
Lucifer borrows a minibus and drives to Hakodate. Sakuya rides on ahead on his motorbike. Atsuro has reconciled with his parents and moved back home, but Yuki is still estranged from his parents and living with Towa. Lucifer tries to find live venues to play, but the bars only want local bands and are not impressed by the second placing in the Tokyo contest. The band members all try and fail to persuade the clubs. Sakuya suggests a 24 hour live show by the roadside. A crowd gathers. Two men want to sell their theater tickets and hang out with them. Afterwards, one offers to lend them a venue. Yuuka advertises the "Lucifer live warehouse show". It is a huge success. They drive on to the next city, Nagoya.
16	"Rival" (ライバル)	August 17, 1999
In Nagoya, Yuki and Yuuka try to find a club that is not already booked, but other bands have already tried and failed. That night, Lucifer sees the band Feel perform before a large audience in the park. At another club, Sakuya and Yuuka try to convince the manager to let Lucifer play as support act for Woods Black, but Feel's lead singer appears with the same request. They agree to do a joint show in the park to decide the matter. Lucifer fears the audience will be biased, as the crowd knows Feel but not Lucifer. Before their real gig begins, Sakuya plays a harmonica composition and wins over the crowd. Neither band gets to play as support act, as both are better than the original band.
17	"Osaka Rhapsody" (オオサカ・ラプソディー)	August 31, 1999
In Osaka, their next stop, a bar accepts the band. Atsuro is feeling low again. Sakuya takes a solitary walk. The others watch Towa's old band Neon perform, advertising their debut album. Towa acknowledges their significant improvement. Neon watches Lucifer perform at the bar. Towa plays lead guitar, but Atsuro plays badly. After a fight with Santa, Atsuro goes off with girl band Lorelei, whom he saw playing in the park. The other band members worry and search for him. The female guitarist understands Atsuro's situation and gives him advice. She invites him to a joint gig that evening, and phones Lucifer to invite them as guests. Atsuro reunites with his bandmates and apologizes; the others say he was amazing on stage.
18	"Coming Home" (カミング・ホーム)	September 14, 1999
On the way back to Tokyo, the band remembers the idea they had after the contest of doing a national live tour. Lucifer's "comeback" concert at the park coincides with a typhoon, but they brave the storm and the audience grows despite the weather. An unknown man searches for the band and finds Yuuka's advertisement. He attends the concert, reveals himself as a judge from the Tokyo contest, and offers them an official debut.
19	"Debut" (デビュー)	September 23, 1999
The man is Sasaki, a successful producer. He and Lucifer meet, discuss the contract, and they sign. This is Aine Yukimura's first appearance: a girl who likes to write poems, but doesn't care about the entertainment business. Her parents fight constantly and do not show her much love and care. Her relationship with her boyfriend is not going well, and she is wondering what true love is. Lucifer, now renamed Ʌucifer, records its debut song, but needs many takes to get it right. Sakuya accepts a bet with the irritated staff: if the song does not get to Number 3 on the charts at least, Ʌucifer will give up music.
20	"History" (ヒストリー)	October 3, 1999
Ʌucifer does a radio broadcast, and Aine listens. They introduce the band members. (Recap of previous episodes).
21	"Hit Charts" (ヒットチャート)	October 10, 1999
Ʌucifer's song only reaches Number 7 on the charts. Sakuya wants to leave because he has lost the bet, but Sasaki forbids it and wants a chance to redeem the band. Sakuya makes a live announcement that if their second single does not hit the top of the charts, Ʌucifer will give up music. Sasaki blames Sakuya for their Number 7 position, saying the fans feel his coldness. The pressure is on Sakuya to write a better song for the second single. It will be introduced at the end of their debut concert. Sakuya meets the woman from the hotel again. She tells him he has never loved anyone seriously. He is unable to write the song. It is the day of the concert. Aine has finished her poem, and later sees her boyfriend cheating. She runs across the street as Sakuya is riding past on his motorbike.
22	"Song Writer" (ソング・ライター)	October 17, 1999
Sakuya stops in time to avoid knocking Aine down, but she slumps to the ground. He gives her a backstage pass to make amends. She walks away, leaving a fallen page containing her poem, which Sakuya picks up. That evening, Aine decides to go to the concert. She hears her poem being sung. It is the man who almost ran her down. Sakuya sees her and pulls her backstage as soon as the lights go off. Sasaki sends Aine away. Sakuya attacks Sasaki and announces that Aine wrote the song. After school, Sakuya collects Aine and drives her to Jupiter Records. Sasaki wants the songwriter officially announced, but using a male penname. Later, Aine says that she cannot write lyrics for Ʌucifer as she does not know Sakuya or the other band members. Sakuya agrees to tell her all about himself.
23	"Yesterday" (イェスタデイ)	October 24, 1999
Sakuya tells Aine about his past. His mother was an alcoholic jazz singer. Sakuya was the unwanted child she had with an American man, and she neglected him. Aine thinks of phrases for the new song, and gives them to Sakuya in front of some of his fans. They ambush Aine, but Sakuya rescues her and promises to protect her. The band notices he has changed since meeting Aine.
24	"Long Goodbye" (ロング・グッドバイ)	October 31, 1999
The second single hits the top of the charts, and Ʌucifer does not have to give up music. Yuuka turns down the offer to make a music video for Ʌucifer, nominating Aine for the job instead. Yuuka is no longer their producer since Ʌucifer's debut single, and she decides to fulfill her own dream by going to London to study the music business. Ʌucifer is sad to lose her. Yuuka leaves for London early, and the band members cannot go to say goodbye as they are now too famous. Aine gives Yuuka a CD as a farewell gift before Yuuka boards her flight. Ʌucifer thanks her for everything she did and plays a concert just for her by the runway.
25	"Junior" (ジュニア)	November 7, 1999
The American Grazer Group plans to enter the music industry in Japan through its company, Metro Records. Vice president Ralph Grazer has an interest in Ʌucifer. He and Sakuya meet and there is instant rivalry between them. Ralph decides to crush Ʌucifer, organizing a charity concert on the same day next to where Ʌucifer's concerts scheduled. Internationally famous artist Freddy Brown sings at the charity concert, attracting more media attention than Ʌucifer. His concert hall is not big enough to contain the crowd. Ʌucifer makes uses of this, allowing the people collected outside the hall to attend their concert instead.
26	"Knock Out" (ノック・アウト)	November 14, 1999
Ʌucifer's popularity is boosted. Ralph decides to crush them once and for all. Metro Records poaches five popular bands from different record companies, and also tries to buy Ʌucifer but the band refuses. The bought bands must each release a single on the release date of Ʌucifer's third single. Ʌucifer assumes this is because they declined the offer. Sakuya wants to release five singles at once to top Ralph's plan. Sakuya and Aine must spend a week in a hotel next to Metro Records to write the new songs.
27	"Sympathy" (シンパシー)	November 21, 1999
Sakuya and Aine have trouble writing the songs. The other band members promote the songs in advance. The first song is completed, then the second and third. Ralph learns that a girl is staying with Sakuya in the honeymoon suite. He decides to spread the rumor to the media. The fourth song is finished. Jupiter Records has trouble dealing with the rumor.
28	"Scandal" (スキャンダル)	November 28, 1999
Paparazzi besiege the hotel, but the Ʌucifer members get Aine out undetected. Sakuya and Aine are separated, and have trouble writing the last song. Ralph uses Sakuya's past against him. Kudo, from the band Radical, gossips to the media about Sakuya. Ʌucifer gets a bad name, and the stores reduce their orders of the new singles. Yumi invites Ʌucifer onto her radio show to counter the bad press. Listening to the radio show, Aine gets an idea for the last song and finishes the lyrics for "Plasmagic".
29	"Destiny" (ディスティニー)	December 5, 1999
Thanks to the radio show, the stores change their mind and reorder the single. Ralph launches a major promotion for his bands. Ʌucifer does not give up, and "Plasmagic" reaches Number 1. Ralph is furious, and orders the media to boycott Ʌucifer. Ʌucifer assumes this is because they refused to go over to Metro Records. Ralph tells Sakuya he has nothing against Ʌucifer, it is Sakuya he is interested in. The other members decide to do a concert tour and Sakuya has no intention of letting Ralph win. On tour, they visit the ticket seller in Hakodate, the band Lorelei in Osaka, and many other cities. In Tokyo, Ralph phones Sasaki and orders Ʌucifer to disband or Metro Records will boycott all Jupiter Records artists.
30	"Unplugged" (アンプラグド)	December 12, 1999
Jupiter Records has no choice but to bow to Ralph. Ʌucifer wants to leave with Sasaki to set up their own production house. Sakuya says Ralph will harass Ʌucifer whatever they do, because of Sakuya. Sakuya is Ralph's half-brother, seen by Ralph as his greatest threat. Sakuya announces that Ʌucifer is disbanded, and leaves Japan. Feel wants to recruit Atsuro, and Neon wants Towa back, but both band members decline. The ex-members all decide to release their own debut singles. Their individual popularity rises.
31	"Reborn" (リ・ボーン)	December 19, 1999
The former band members' debut singles are successful. All are invited to play at the J-Rock festival. Ralph decides to use their popularity to reform Ʌucifer there with Freddy Brown as lead singer. Sasaki accepts, leaves Japan to inform Freddy, and tells the ex-members. At the J-Rock festival, the members announce Ʌucifer's revival. Freddy arrives by helicopter, bringing Sakuya with him. The band announces Sakuya's return as lead vocalist. They use the festival broadcast to promote their comeback concert at the Todo residence.
32	"Loser" (ルーザー)	December 26, 1999
Ʌucifer has got the better of Ralph, but Ralph spots Aine hiding behind Sakuya. Ralph wants a total media boycott of Ʌucifer, but the media refuse. Ralph incites Radical's Kudo and Neon's leader to disrupt the Ʌucifer show, but even they refuse. The media, discovering Ralph's aim of destroying Ʌucifer, besiege Metro Records. Ʌucifer celebrates. Aine runs an errand, and is kidnapped. Ralph phones Sakuya telling him to meet at a hotel to settle things once and for all.
33	"After Days" (アフター・デイズ)	January 9, 2000
Sakuya goes to meet Ralph, but wants to know where Aine is. Ralph tells him to disband Ʌucifer again, and reveals that their father sent him to Japan to compete with Sakuya. Ralph's men beat Sakuya, only stopping when they receive an order from Rupert Grazer firing Ralph and calling him back to America. The half-brothers have a fistfight. Sakuya leaves to look for Aine, and finds her in a hotel room. Rupert Grazer offers Sakuya the Grazer Company and the chance to launch himself in America. Sakuya declines. Sakuya asks Aine to go for a walk with him. He tells her to stay with him so that he can protect her, because he brought her into the dangerous entertainment business. She says she is glad she met him, and they kiss in the street.
34	"Actress" (アクトレス)	January 16, 2000
Ʌucifer's next single is to be the theme song of a drama with Ayako Sakura in the lead role, but Sakuya is unenthusiastic. When Ayako finds out Ʌucifer is writing the theme song, she goes to see Sakuya at Jupiter Records. Sakuya is angry when she reveals their past romantic relationship. Ayako wants Sakuya to play the male lead, her lover in the drama. Aine is bothered by Ayako and Sakuya's past relationship, but Sakuya tells her that his future belongs to Aine alone. He turns down Ayako's offer, and Ayako insults the band. Sakuya then agrees to take the lead role, aiming to get revenge through superior ability. Aine is upset seeing them act together. Ayako falls more deeply in love with Sakuya.
35	"Femme Fatale" (ファムファタール)	January 23, 2000
Ayako notices that Aine always hangs around Sakuya. Aine's lyrics are repeatedly rejected, except after she spends a day with Sakuya. Ayako orders someone to do something to stop Aine watching filming, and a scaffold falls on Aine. Sakuya is injured shielding Aine with his body. Ayako blames Aine for the delay in filming, saying she caused Sakuya's wound. Sakuya wants to go on acting to prove Ayako wrong. Ayako learns that Aine is Ʌucifer's songwriter. She hires a photographer to expose their secret and their relationship. Sakuya gets revenge by tricking the reporter into disclosing the false relationship between Sakuya and Ayako. Ayako falls to the floor with blood pouring from a cut on her arm.
36	"Final Act" (ファイナルアクト)	January 30, 2000
Aine calls an ambulance and stays with Ayako until she regains consciousness. Ayako tells Aine she is depressed. Sakuya tells Ayako she did not really intend to die. Sakuya is blamed for their love scandal and the suicide rumors. Only Aine knows that Sakuya acted to protect her, and because of this feels that she is a burden to him. Aine begs Ayako to stop causing trouble for Sakuya. Aine collapses from the strain, but Sakuya catches her and takes her to his flat. He looks after Aine and she says she wants him to continue filming. Sakuya tells Ayako he loves Aine alone. Ayako announces to the press that she and Sakuya have broken up.
37	"Top Runners" (トップランナー)	February 6, 2000
Ʌucifer is to play a three-day concert at the Dome. Sasaki thinks that Ʌucifer has become overconfident. Atsuro must to go to school and study for exams as he has a deal with his parents that he will graduate from high school. Yumi has problems, and Santa wants to help her by being her drummer. Yuki must rehearse to replace his sick father in the Noh performances. Towa looks after a stray puppy. Sakuya goes on dates with Aine. Sasaki is angry because the band members are neglecting rehearsals and taking the concert too lightly. He discovers talented band e.MU, likely to surpass Ʌucifer.
38	"Mistake" (ミステイク)	February 13, 2000
Sasaki steps down as Ʌucifer's manager, and Aine takes over the job. Santa's unprofessional behavior annoys Sakuya. The band members squabble. Sasaki says that Ʌucifer cannot stay at Number 1 forever, and that e.MU will beat them. Sasaki ejects Ʌucifer from their rehearsal room, but the others agree to overthrow the barrier. Ʌucifer and e.MU compete on a live broadcast. Because Ʌucifer uses a new arrangement for the concert they play badly, and e.MU dominates. The first e.MU single hits the top of the charts, and Sasaki wants e.MU to play at the Dome instead of Ʌucifer.
39	"Painful Choice" (ペインフル・チョイス)	February 20, 2000
The board of directors has decided that e.MU will take over the three-day concert. Sasaki wants Aine to write lyrics for e.MU, but she declines. Atsuro's exams are over, and Yuki stops his Noh rehearsals and returns to the band. The Cradle is to reopen. Ʌucifer wants to improve so that the event will be a success. Santa is absent-minded. Yumi tells him that she is breaking up her band and going back to her hometown to let him concentrate on Ʌucifer. Yuki wants to do another live tour, but Sakuya wants to win the three-day Dome concert back from e.MU.
40	"Emotion" (エモーション)	February 27, 2000
Sakuya suggests that Aine should write two song lyrics, one for e.MU and one for Ʌucifer. Both singles will release on the same day. The band that is at the top of the charts after two weeks will play the concert. Sakuya must write the melody. He asks the other band members how they feel about the lyrics, and about Ʌucifer. e.MU does a lot of promotion; Ʌucifer does none. After one week, e.MU is higher on the charts. But constant requests for the Ʌucifer single on radio boosts Ʌucifer's sales above e.MU's. Sakuya reveals that he was thinking of his lover being hurt as he composed the music. Daisuke, e.MU's leader, congratulates Sakuya on winning. Even Sasaki is happy, as his intention was to push Ʌucifer forward. On their way home, Aine runs across the road without looking. Sakuya pushes her to safety but is knocked down by a truck.
41	"Never Die" (ネバー・ダイ)	March 5, 2000
Sakuya is in surgery and Aine blames herself. During surgery Sakuya's heart stops and he dreams that he is not needed. But in his dream he sees Aine crying and remembers the promise he made. His hearts starts beating again. Aine, the band, and all the fans outside the hospital are relieved. Sakuya asks Aine to help him attend Ʌucifer's evening rehearsals, but he is weak and collapses at one of the sessions. When the media discovers that Sakuya was injured saving a girl, Sasaki orders Aine not to come to the hospital again. But the fans know her already, and beat her up.
42	"Separate Eve" (セパレート・イブ)	March 12, 2000
Sakuya cannot manage a 2 hour performance, so Sasaki invites e.MU to give a half-hour special guest performance. Sasaki says no one should tell Sakuya the media know a girl was involved in the accident. On day one of the concert, Aine is looking for the backstage area but the fans head her off. Sakuya finds out the media know about Aine and he tries to find her because he knows the fans know who she is. The band members do not realize and try to stop him, sending staff to look for Aine.
43	"Love Melody" (ラブメロディー)	March 19, 2000
The fans are waiting and Ʌucifer must go on stage. Aine is beaten up, but is found and is treated by a doctor. Sakuya sees it happen and is angry, but Aine comforts him. Aine watches Ʌucifer from the audience. Sakuya declares his love for Aine and begs the fans not to blame her. On the second day, a foreigner asks Aine to show him the way to the Dome, but he leaves part way through the concert. Sasaki does not catch him, but tells Ʌucifer he is England's most influential producer, whom Sasaki had invited to help Ʌucifer break into the international market.
44	"Fly Away" (フライ・アウェイ)	March 26, 2000
Ʌucifer takes a break and prepares for the Cradle's reopening. On the evening of the relaunch, the foreign producer reappears. He says Ʌucifer has talent, but should not leave Japan, where they are so popular. He does not intend to be their producer, but says he will accept if Ʌucifer reaches Number 1 on the UK's independent music charts within six months. Sakuya turns him down, saying two months is enough time. Ʌucifer and Aine leave for London and begin performing at live clubs, with Yuuka as their manager. Ralph says that the real battle begins now.

=== Soundtracks ===
Kaikan Phrase Original Soundtrack (快感フレーズ Original Soundtrack) is the anime series soundtrack album. It was released on February 16, 2000, by Pony Canyon. Some tracks are performed by Λucifer, the real-world counterpart of the fictional rock band of the series.

Kaikan Phrase Visualism (or Kaikan Phrase BGM Image Album: VISUALISM) was released on March 15, 2000, by Pony Canyon. In addition, a self-titled album by Λucifer was released on April 15, 1998, by PolyGram, containing songs from the manga.

=== Video games ===
A video game based on the series, Kaikan Phrase: Datenshi Kourin, was released in Japan by Enix for the Sony PlayStation on February 24, 2000. Produced by Produce, it is a single-player music game featuring the five members of Λucifer. In 2010, Datenshi no Amai Yuuwaku x Kaikan Phrase was released for the Nintendo DS.

On October 15, 2019, a mobile game titled Sensual Phrase Climax: Next Generation was launched for the iOS and Android.

=== Other ===
In 2006, a film adaption of Sensual Phrase was reportedly discussed by Shogakukan's Sensual Phrase editor, but the idea was rejected because the company felt the project would be too complicated. According to Shinjo, she was unaware of the proposal until several years later.

An artbook called SA KU YA (ISBN 4-09-199791-0) and a postcard book based on the manga were also published.
