= Haou Airen =

Japanese manga series

- Cover of Japanese volume 1, featuring Hakuron

覇王・愛人
- Manga
- Written by: Mayu Shinjo
- Published by: Shogakukan
- Magazine: Shōjo Comic
- Original run: 2002 – 2004
- Volumes: 9

Haou Airen (覇王・愛人; lit. 'Supreme King's Mistress') is a Japanese shōjo manga series created by Mayu Shinjo.

== Plot ==
One day while walking home from her job, Kurumi Akino finds a wounded young man, and saves his life. He mysteriously disappears after that, and leaves only the name "Hakuron". Next thing she knows she's been kidnapped from her school, and is on a private jet with that man, heading to Hong Kong. It turns out she saved the life of the most infamous mobster in Hong Kong, and he wants her to stay with him...

== Characters ==
Kurumi Akino (秋野来実, Akino Kurumi)
The 17-year-old main character. She is a very innocent and naive girl living with her ill mother and two brothers that she constantly needs to take care of. Her first encounter with Hakuron is when she saves his life after he is wounded in the backstreets near her home. The next day she is kidnapped by mafia men who take her to Hakuron. Kurumi finds her beginning to fall for Hakuron whilst she becomes wrapped up in the dangerous world of mafia war and rivalry. Kurumi and Hakuron's relationship takes a sour turn for the worse when she witnesses him kill a classmate of hers, even when that classmate tried to have her gang-raped by some male students. Hakuron, frustrated by her rejection even though he saved Kurumi, rapes her in order to try to keep hold of her. Eventually, Kurumi loses her memory and the tension between them is resolved. Hakuron proposes and Kurumi happily accepts. On their wedding day, however, Hakuron is shot dead by Kurumi's friend Kaafai. Kurumi is shown three years later to have returned to her mother and siblings but still watched over by Hakuron's loyal workers. She visits the church, the sight of the shooting, and expresses her desire to stay strong and smile for him.

Uon Hakuron (黑龍, Hakuron Uon)
Eighteen-year-old mafia in the Hong Kong mafia. His real name is Wang Li Chien (王厲誠) and his family descended from the royal line in China. A fortune teller foretold that he would bring the downfall of his clan so his father tried to kill him. It set off a series of events to happen, causing his mother to be killed and Hakuron killing his father, the first of the many murders that would lead to him becoming the much feared man in the Triads. His mother left him with a Dragon Jade of which she swore would protect for the rest of his life. He seems like a very coldblooded man, but actually has a very kind side that rarely anyone notices. He falls in love with Kurumi, but many other organizations use her to try to ruin Hakuron and that leads to Hakuron to thinking that he would rather hurt Kurumi mentally if it means he can protect her. Kaafai, the friend of Kurumi, witnesses Hakuron rape Kurumi and harbours a deep hatred towards him. Later on in the story Kaafai sees that Kurumi has returned to Hakuron despite the periods of abuse. Hakuron proposes to Kurumi and upon the wedding day he relinquishes all his weaponry and guards so he can marry Kurumi as just a normal man. Kaafai, however, appears with a gun and shoots Hakuron dead outside the church.
Lei Lan (麗蘭, Reiran)
The jealous fiance of Hakuron. She attempted to ruin Kurumi's life, and by using a few of her high-school classmates, tries to take her virginity, but was stopped by Hakuron in time. She becomes Kurumi's 'friend' in order to make her life a misery. She was later killed by him, leading to a misunderstanding between Kurumi and Hakuron. She was gang-raped by Eason Yen's gang and slept with many classmates. Before her death she realized that Hakuron never loved her.
Kaafai
He saves Kurumi when she runs away from being constantly sexually abused by Hakuron. He takes her to his family's restaurant and they welcome her in. Kaafai eventually falls in love with her, but later on, Hakuron finds the restaurant and forcefully takes Kurumi back. Kurumi might have had a little crush on Kaafai, but she loved Hakuron more. Kaafai kills Hakuron just before Kurumi and Hakuron are about to get married.

- Eason Yen

The leader of the White Tiger group, who has a grudge against Hakuron for causing the scar on his forehead. He kidnapped Kurumi and tried to get to Hakuron through her.

- Shuu Min Roi

Hakuron's most loyal henchman. He would use any means necessary to finish the job assigned to him by Hakuron.

- Fuoron Huo Long

One of Hakuron's henchmen who cross-dresses and is in love with Kurumi. He is the son of a firework maker.

- Di Long

A ladies man who is attracted to Kurumi. His name means Earth Dragon.

- Shui Long

Shui Long is a doctor and member of Hakuron's gang.

- Lesile Lam

A famous singer from Hong Kong nicknamed 'The Signing Princess of Asia'. She is in love with Hakouron.

== Manga ==
In Japan, Haou Airen has been collected in nine bound volumes:

1. ISBN 4-09-136757-7 published in June 2002
2. ISBN 4-09-136758-5 published in September 2002
3. ISBN 4-09-136759-3 published in November 2002
4. ISBN 4-09-136760-7 published in February 2003
5. ISBN 4-09-138291-6 published in May 2003
6. ISBN 4-09-138292-4 published in August 2003
7. ISBN 4-09-138293-2 published in November 2003
8. ISBN 4-09-138294-0 published in February 2004
9. ISBN 4-09-138295-9 published in May 2004
