= Mayu Shinjo =

Japanese manga artist (born 1973)

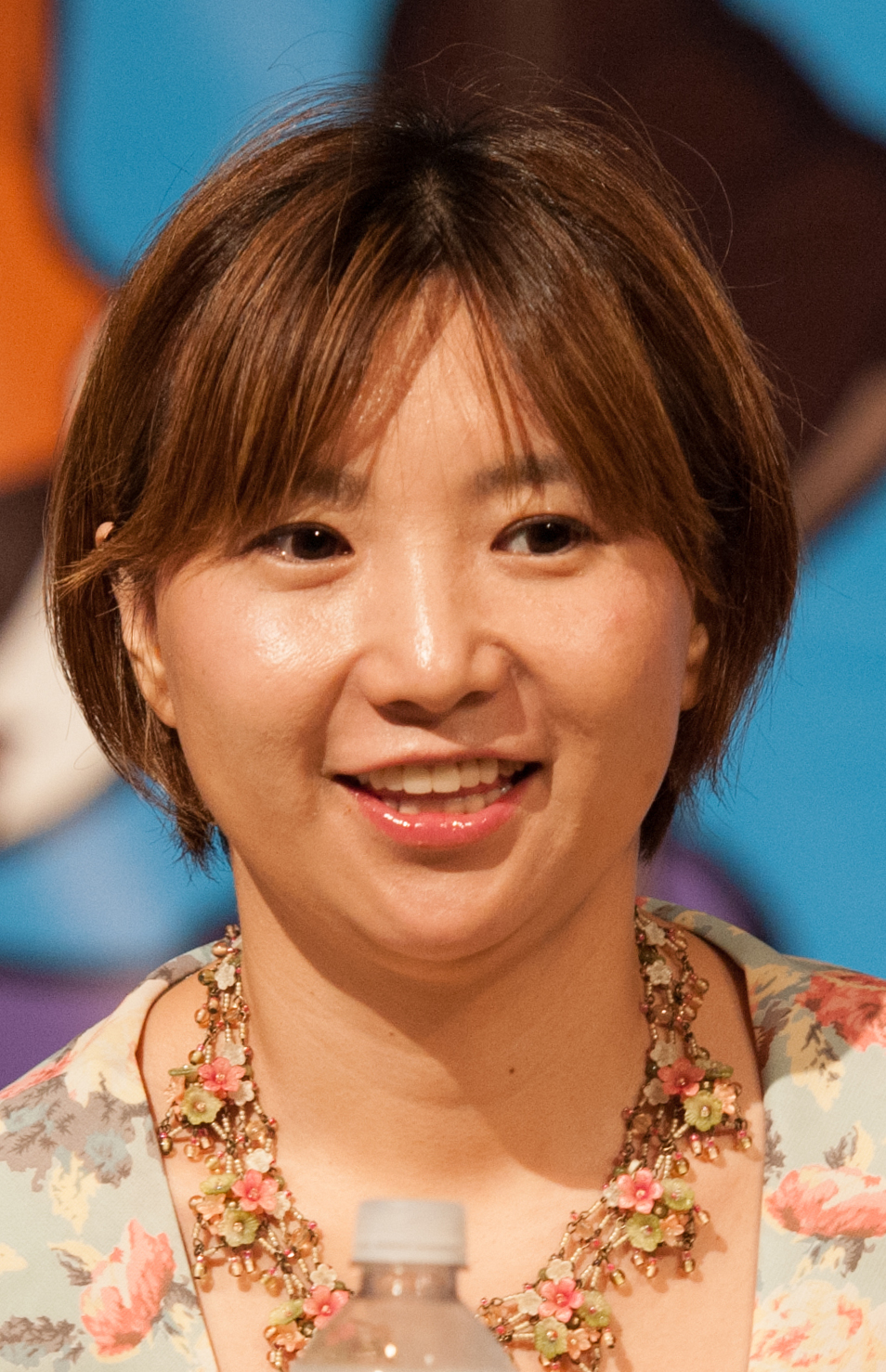
- Mayu Shinjo in 2012
- Born: January 26, 1973 (age 53); Sasebo, Nagasaki, Japan
- Occupation: Manga artist
- Known for: Sensual Phrase
- Website: Mayutan.com

Mayu Shinjo (新條まゆ, Shinjō Mayu; born 1973) is a Japanese manga artist. She debuted in 1994 in Shogakukan's Shōjo Comic with "Anata no Iro ni Somaritai". She continued writing for Shogakukan until 2007, with her works appearing in both Shōjo Comic and their other magazine Cheese!. She left the company to go freelance citing a dispute over working conditions and abusive treatment by her editor.

== Professional career ==
Shinjo made her debut at publisher Shogakukan in 1994, drawing series for Shōjo Comic magazine. In 2007 she left the company, noting that her editors were excessively demanding and abusive, creating a stressful work environment.

In her blog, Shinjo noted that though she was the actual creator of her manga titles, she was one of the last to know about any adaptation plans for her series, even learning about some through TV channel websites instead of her editor. When she decided to leave, one editor threatened to take all of her earlier series out of print, but Shinjo contacted a lawyer and the threat was never carried out.

In a 2014 interview with Hikari TV's online magazine, Katte ni Dokusho Densetsu, Shinjo announced her plans to no longer write shojo manga and instead to only focus on writing BL manga.

== Bibliography ==
Dates listed are dates for original serialization.

- (1995) Make Love shiyo!!
- (1996) Sexy Guardian (SEXYガ―ディアン)
- (1996) Suki Shite Sadist (すきしてサディスト; lit. Love Me Sadist)
- (1997) Kaikan Furēzu (快感 フレーズ); English translation: Sensual Phrase
- (2001) Akuma na Eros (悪魔なエロス; lit. Devilish Eros)
- (2003-2004) Kimi sae mo Ai no Kusari
- (2002-2004) Haou Airen (覇王・愛人; lit. Supreme King's Mistress)
- (2005) The Poisonous Flower
- (2004-2006) Rabu Serebu (ラブセレブ); English translation: Love Celeb
- (2006-2007) Ai wo Utau yori Ore ni Oborero! (愛を歌うより俺に溺れろ!)
- (2006-2007) SEX=LOVE^{2}
- (2008) Midnight Children
- (2008–2011) Ai Ore! – Danshikō no Hime to Joshikō no Ōji (愛俺! 〜男子校の姫と女子校の王子〜), English translation: Ai Ore: Love Me!
- (2008) Demon Love Spell
- (2009) Apple
- (2009) Hāto no Daiya (ハートのダイヤ; lit. The Diamond of Heart)
- (2010) Goshimeidesu

Next:

- After School Wedding
- Anata ni tsunagaretai (I want to be tied to you)
- Anata no Iro ni Somarita (I want to dye myself your color)
- Chou Ai Strip (Lavish Love Strip)
- City Romance (Short Story)
- Dame Ijiwaru H
- Dakishimete tokashite
- Doting Love Strip
- Haou Airen (Supreme King of Lovers or Despotic Lover)
- Hokenshitsu no My Darling
- Itai Ai
- I want to be a Fiancée
- Junai Strip (Honest Love Strip)
- Kinenbi tokubetsuna H
- Motto Oshiete (Teach Me More)
- Senpai amasugiru
- Side Seat Daite (Embrace me on the side seat)
- Summer Days 17
- Shonen no Susume
- TABOO ni Daite (Embraced by Taboo)
- Yasashiku mitene
- Zakuro no Mi wo abaite
- NEW!! The Poisonous Flower
