= Virginie Greiner =

French comic book scriptwriter (born 1969)

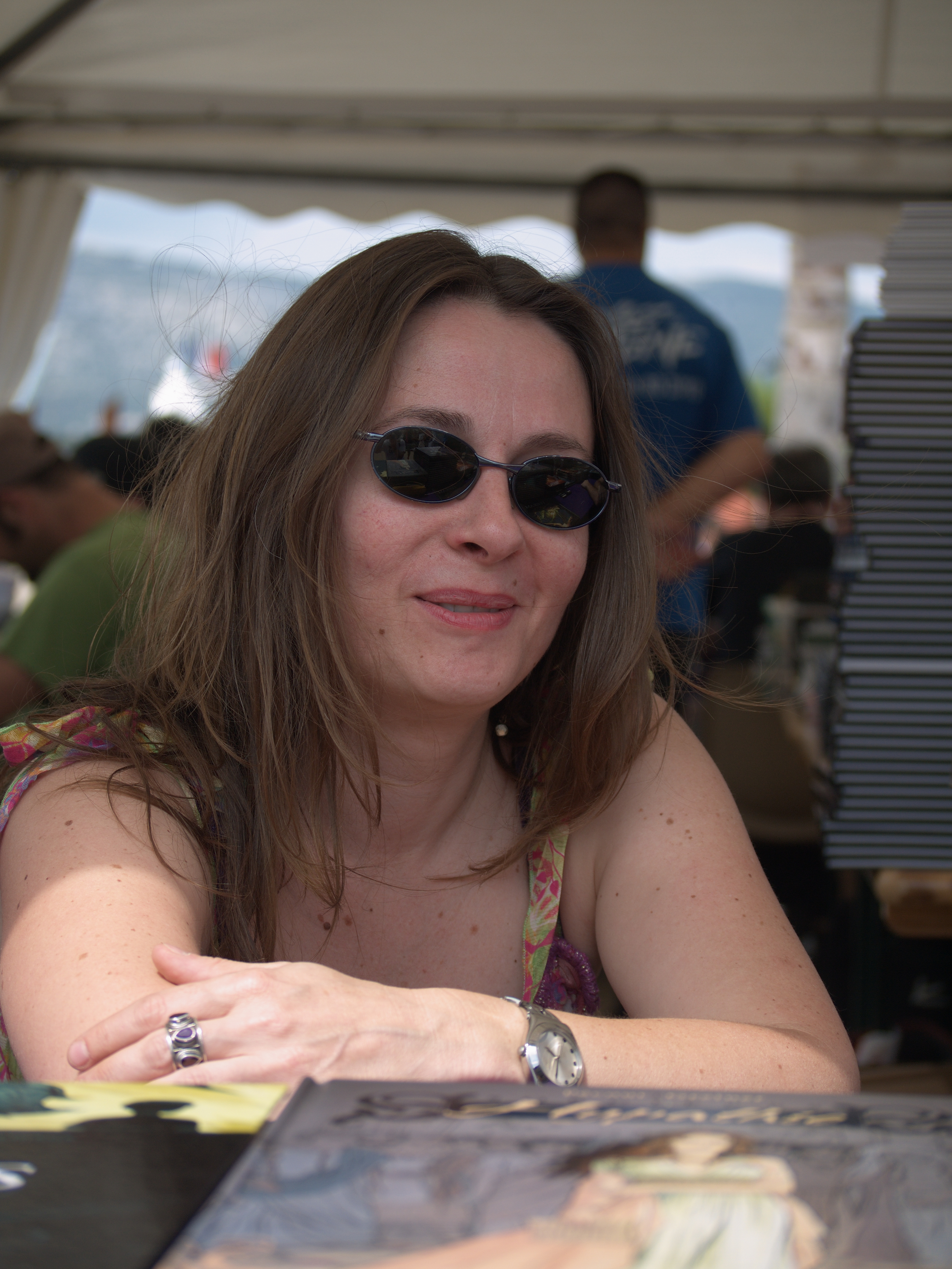
- (2010)
- Born: 3 September 1969 (age 56) Saint-Germain-en-Laye, France
- Occupation: comic book scriptwriter
- Genre: Bande dessinée
- Literary movement: collective of female comics creators against sexism
- Spouse: Frank Giroud

Virginie Greiner (born 3 September 1969) is a French comic book scriptwriter who lives in Montélimar, and is affiliated with the collective of female comics creators against sexism.

== Biography ==
Virginie Greiner was born in Saint-Germain-en-Laye, France. She studied law then worked for a time in bookshops and collaborated with BoDoï, a monthly magazine devoted to comics. In 2004, she wrote a short story in the collection Fées, Sorcières et Diablesses. Greiner frequently features heroines "whose merits are often overlooked or understated". A committed feminist, she is part of the collective of female comics creators against sexism and campaigns for gender equality in the world of bande dessinée.

In 2005, joining forces with Annabel, Greiner published her first album with the publisher, Clair de Lune, Willow Place, which was inspired by "the spiritualist writings of Arthur Conan Doyle". The following year, she wrote the texts for a collection of collective illustrations, En mâle de nus, which received a mixed critical reception.

In collaboration with her husband, Frank Giroud, Greiner co-wrote the script for the first volume of the Secrets series (2009), drawn by Marianne Duvivier, Pâques avant les Rameaux. Both are also writers of the second volume of the Destins series (2010), with drawings by Daphné Collignon. The same year, in tandem with Christelle Pécout, Hypathie appeared as the second part of a diptych entitled Sorcières, which relates to the eponymous character.

She took part in Delcourt's "Reines de sang" collection with the script for the diptych on Fredegund, with drawings by Alessia De Vincenzi (2014-16). Greiner resumed collaboration with Collignon to trace the youth of André Malraux and his wife Clara Malraux, based on Mrs. Malraux's autobiography: Nos vingt ans; the work is called Avant l'heure du tigre. The two authors published a biography in 2016: Tamara de Lempicka. After this work, Greiner was the guest of honor at the 28th Causons comic book festival in Cousance. Again in collaboration with Annabel, Greiner created the portrait of Isabelle Eberhardt, published in 2018. In 2019, Greiner wrote the script for Mata Hari, which offers the biography of the famous character, with drawings by Olivier Roman.

== Selected works ==
Unless otherwise stated, Greiner is the scriptwriter:

- Cadavres exquis, with Crisse, éd. Clair de Lune, 2004 ISBN 2-913714-64-1 BnF 39282758
- Willow Place : Réincarnations, designed by Annabel, éd. Clair de Lune, coll. "Fantasmagorie", March 2005 ISBN 2-913714-59-5 BnF 39946707
- En mâle de nus (text), collective illustrations, éd Attakus, 2006, ISBN 9782916518008 BnF 40152276
- Secrets, vol. 1 : Pâques avant les Rameaux, co-written with Frank Giroud, designed by Marianne Duvivier, Dupuis coll. Empreinte(s), February 2009 ISBN 978-2-8001-4104-6
- Destins, vol. 2 : Le Fils, co-written with Frank Giroud, design and colouring by Daphné Collignon, Glénat Editions, coll. Grafica, January 2010 ISBN 978-2-7234-6748-3 BnF 42195077
- Sorcières, vol. 2 : Hypathie, designed by Christelle Pécout, Dupuis, March 2010 ISBN 978-2-8001-4649-2 BnF 42170276
- En chemin elle rencontre... Les artistes se mobilisent pour l'égalité femme-homme, by Marie Moinard and collective, Vincennes/Paris, Des ronds dans l'O/Amnesty International, February 2013 ISBN 978-2-917237-46-5
- Les Reines de sang : Frédégonde la sanguinaire, design by Alessia De Vincenzi, Delcourt, coll. "Histoire & Histoires"
  - Volume 1, October 2014 ISBN 978-2-7560-3750-9 BnF 43497729
  - Volume 2, October 2016 ISBN 978-2-7560-5414-8 BnF 45132898
- Avant l'heure du Tigre, design and colouring by Daphné Collignon, Glénat, April 2015 ISBN 978-2-7234-9468-7 BnF F44313277
- Tamara de Lempicka, design and colouring by Daphné Collignon, Glénat, coll. 1000 Feuilles, November 2017 ISBN 978-2-344-00826-3 BnF 45395725
- Isabelle Eberhardt, design by Annabel, Glénat, coll. Explora, October 2018 ISBN 978-2-344-01934-4 BnF 45526135
- Rendez-vous avec X, vol. 3 : Mata Hari, design and colouring by Olivier Roman, Comix Buro, coll. Hors Collection, October 2019 ISBN 978-2-344-03262-6
