= Daphné Collignon =

French comics artist (born 1977)

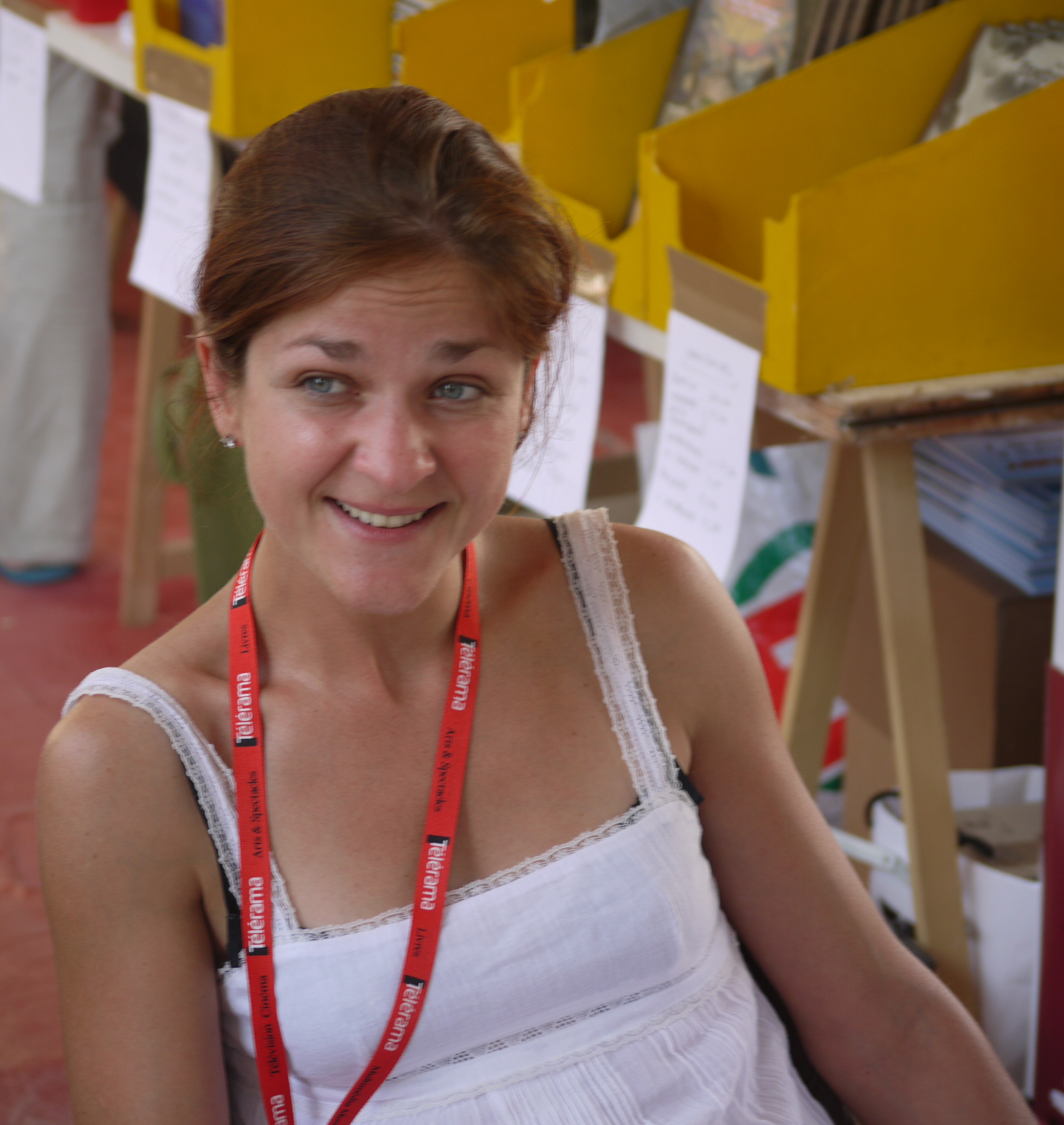
- (2009)
- Born: 8 September 1977 (age 48); Lyon, France
- Education: École Émile-Cohl
- Occupations: Comic book author; illustrator

Daphné Collignon (born 8 September 1977, Lyon) is a French comic book author. She also illustrates children's books.

== Biography ==
A graduate of the École Émile-Cohl, Collignon began by illustrating Isabelle Dethan's scriptwriter, Le Rêve de Pierres. Collignon continued with the two volumes of Cœlacanthes. In 2009, she collaborated with the reporter, Anne Nivat on the album, Correspondante de guerre.

In 2010, Collignon participated in the series created by Frank Giroud: Destins. Subsequently, she has collaborated regularly with scriptwriter Virginie Greiner. Collignon also illustrates children's books including Badésirédudou, Mélodie des Iles, Trois Gouttes de Sang, Chaân, La Petite Maison dans la Prairie, La Guerre de l'Ours, Calpurnia, Camille Claudel, and Marie Curia. Collignon also taught at the École Émile-Cohl in Lyon. She participated in the collective album, Cher corps (2019), resulting from the work of YouTuber, Léa Bordier.

== Awards and recognition ==
- Prix Ballon rouge, Quai des Bulles, 2004
- Selection of the Prix Artémisia, 2016 for Flora et les Étoiles Filantes with Chantal Van Den Heuvel

== Selected works ==
=== Bande dessinée ===
- Le Rêve de Pierres, with Isabelle Dethan (scriptwriter), Vents d'Ouest "Équinoxe", 2004
- Cœlacanthes - Vol. 1 : Noa (scriptwriter, drawing, and coloring), Vents d'Ouest "Équinoxe", 2006
- Récits Ferroviaires (scriptwriter, drawing, and coloring), collectif, Éditions Ouest-France, 2006
- Cœlacanthes - Vol. 2 : Emma (scriptwriter, drawing, and coloring), Vents d'Ouest "Équinoxe", 2007
- Correspondante de guerre (scriptwriter, drawing, and coloring), with Anne Nivat (scriptwriter), Soleil Productions, 2009
- Marie Moinard and collective, En chemin elle rencontre... : Les artistes se mobilisent contre la violence faite aux femmes, Des ronds dans l'O/Amnesty International, September 2009 ISBN 978-2-917237-06-9
- Destins - Vol. 2 : Le Fils (drawing and colors), with Virginie Greiner (scriptwriter), Glénat Editions "Grafica", 2010
- Sirène (scriptwriter, drawing, and coloring), Dupuis, 2013 ISBN 978-2-8001-5911-9
- Avant l'heure du tigre : La voie Malraux (drawing and coloring), with Virginie Greiner, Glénat, 2015 ISBN 978-2723494687
- Flora et les Étoiles Filantes (adaptation, staging, drawing, and coloring) with Chantal Van Den Heuvel, Le Lombard, 2015
- Tamara de Lempicka (drawing and coloring), with Virginie Greiner (scriptwriter), Glénat, 2017
- Calpurnia, with Jacqueline Kelly (scriptwriter) (adaptation), Rue de Sèvres (publisher), 2018
- Cher corps, with Léa Bordier (scriptwriter), Delcourt, 2019 ISBN 978-2-413-01359-4
- Calpurnia, Vol. 2, with Jacqueline Kelly (scriptwriter) (adaptation), Rue de Sèvres, 2020

=== As illustrator ===
- Douze histoires de la Bible, by Geneviève Laurencin, Flammarion, 2001 ISBN 978-2081600737
- Quinze histoires de la Bible, by Geneviève Laurencin, Flammarion, 2001 ISBN 2-08-161290-9
- Izmir, by Patrick Vendamme, Flammarion "Père Castor", 2002 ISBN 978-2081606470
- L'Ane et le Lion, by Jean Muzi, Flammarion "Père Castor", 2002 ISBN 978-2081612730
- Pas touche à mon copain, by Philippe Barbeau, Flammarion "Castor cadet", 2003 ISBN 978-2081624122
- Mamie mystère, by Marie-Sophie Vermot, Milan Presse "Cadet Plus", 2004 ISBN 978-2745911759
- La Danse de Fiona, by Nathalie Somers, Nathan édition "Premiers Romans", 2010
- Badésirédudou, by Marie-Claude Bérot, Flammarion "Père Castor", 2012 (illustrated reissue)
- Le B.A ba de la Savate - Boxe française, by Victor Sebastiao, Fleur de Ville Éditions, 2013
- Ma Vie de Chien, by France Quatromme, Fleur de Ville Éditions, 2014
- Sorcière des Brumes, by Lena Kaaberbol, Vol. 1, 2, and 3, Bayard "Jeunesse", 2016–17
- Calpurnia, Apprentie Vétérinaire (3 vol.), by Jacqueline Kelly, L'École des loisirs, 2017–18
- Camille Claudel, by Bénédicte Solle-Bazaille, Bayard "Roman Doc Art", 2019
