= Alfred-Henri Bramtot =

French painter (1852–1894)

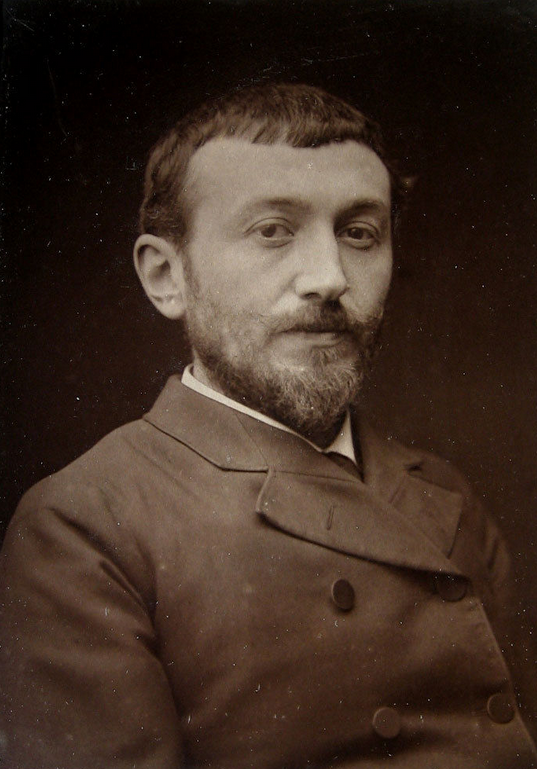
- Alfred-Henri Bramtot, carte de visite; (circa 1890).
- Born: 1852; Paris
- Died: 16 June 1894 (aged 41–42); Garennes-sur-Eure

Alfred-Henri Bramtot (French: [alfʁɛd ɑ̃ʁi bʁɑ̃to]; 1852, Paris – 16 June 1894) was a 19th-century French painter.

== Biography ==
A student at the École des Beaux-Arts de Paris in William Bouguereau's atelier, Alfred-Henri Bramtot won the Prix de Rome for painting in 1879 with La Mort de Démosthène. After his stay in Rome at Villa Medicis, he began a career as a painter and decorator. After competing unsuccessfully for the scenery of the town hall of Arcueil, he participated in the decoration of the council chamber of the town hall of Les Lilas in 1889 on the theme of the universal suffrage (See here) In 1893, he provided the cartoon to glassmaker master Félix Gaudin for the St. Catherine stained glass due to adorn one of the windows of the Sainte-Catherine church in Lille. He regularly exhibited at the Salon: he obtained a third class medal in 1876 and was out of competition after 1885. During the 1890s, he was also a professor at the Académie Julian.

On 24 April 1886, The New York Times informed its readers of his picture Les Amis de Job exhibited at the Salon.

With Georges Duval (died in 1915), he was the author of many drawings intended for paper currency emissions for the French colonies. He was master of drawing at the École polytechnique.

His Parisian studio was located at 3 rue Joseph-Bara in the 6th arrondissement.

== List of paintings ==
(partial list)

Painting	Title	Date	Size	Notes	Location
	Saint Sébastien	1875			Current location unknown (formerly at the city hall of Clermont-Ferrand)
	Aristée	1876			Location unknown
	Figure peinte	1877	81 x 65 cm		Paris, École nationale supérieure des beaux-arts
	Le Massacre des Innocents	1878			
	La Mort de Démosthène	1879	145 x 113 cm		Paris, École nationale supérieure des beaux-arts
	Le Sabbat	1880			
	Portrait of a man	1881	22,5 x 15 cm		Amsterdam Museum
	Le Supplice d'Ixion	1881	238 x 160 cm		Nîmes, Musée des Beaux-Arts
	Compassion	1882	257,4 x 174,7 cm		Newcastle, Laing Art Gallery
	Héliodore (copy after Raphael)	1883			Paris, École nationale supérieure des beaux-arts
	Le Départ de Tobie	1885	240 x 390 cm		Bourges, musée du Berry
	Les Amis de Job	1886			Location unknown
	Le panier d'oranges	1886	51,5 x 40,3 cm		Private collection
	Léda	1888	136 x 220 cm	Exhibited at the Salon of 1888	Location unknown (formerly in Paris, Institut de France)
	Les Fiancés. Les grands-parents	1888	45,5 x 135 cm		Paris, Petit Palais
	La Famille. Le repas de midi	1888	45 x 75 cm		Paris, Petit Palais
	Le Suffrage universel, esquisse pour la mairie des Lilas	1889	34,5 x 52 cm		Paris, Petit Palais
	Le Suffrage universel	1890–1891			Les Lilas, mairie
	Portrait de monsieur Ducros Aubert	1890	67 x 53 cm		Marseille, musée des beaux-arts
	Ruth et Noémie	1890			Location unknown
	Scène biblique. Le départ de Tobie	1890	96,5 x 149,9 cm		Location unknown
	La Pêche galante	1892	75,5 x 101 cm		Private collection
	La Préparation du repas		73 x 54 cm		Private collection
	Vénus et l'Amour		143 x 99 cm		Private collection
	Portrait d'une jeune italienne		21 x 14 cm		Private collection
	Le petit Saint Jean-Baptiste		30x 24 cm		Private collection
	Rêve de Marie				Mulhouse, Musée des Beaux-Arts

== Bibliography ==
- Catalogue premièrement des tableaux, études, dessins, etc. par Bramtot, deuxièmement des tableaux, aquarelles, dessins, pastels offerts à Mme Vve Bramtot par un comité d'artistes, expert : Eugène Féral, Paris, 1895 on Gallica.
