= Hôtel de Ville, Romainville =

Town hall in Romainville, France

Hôtel de Ville
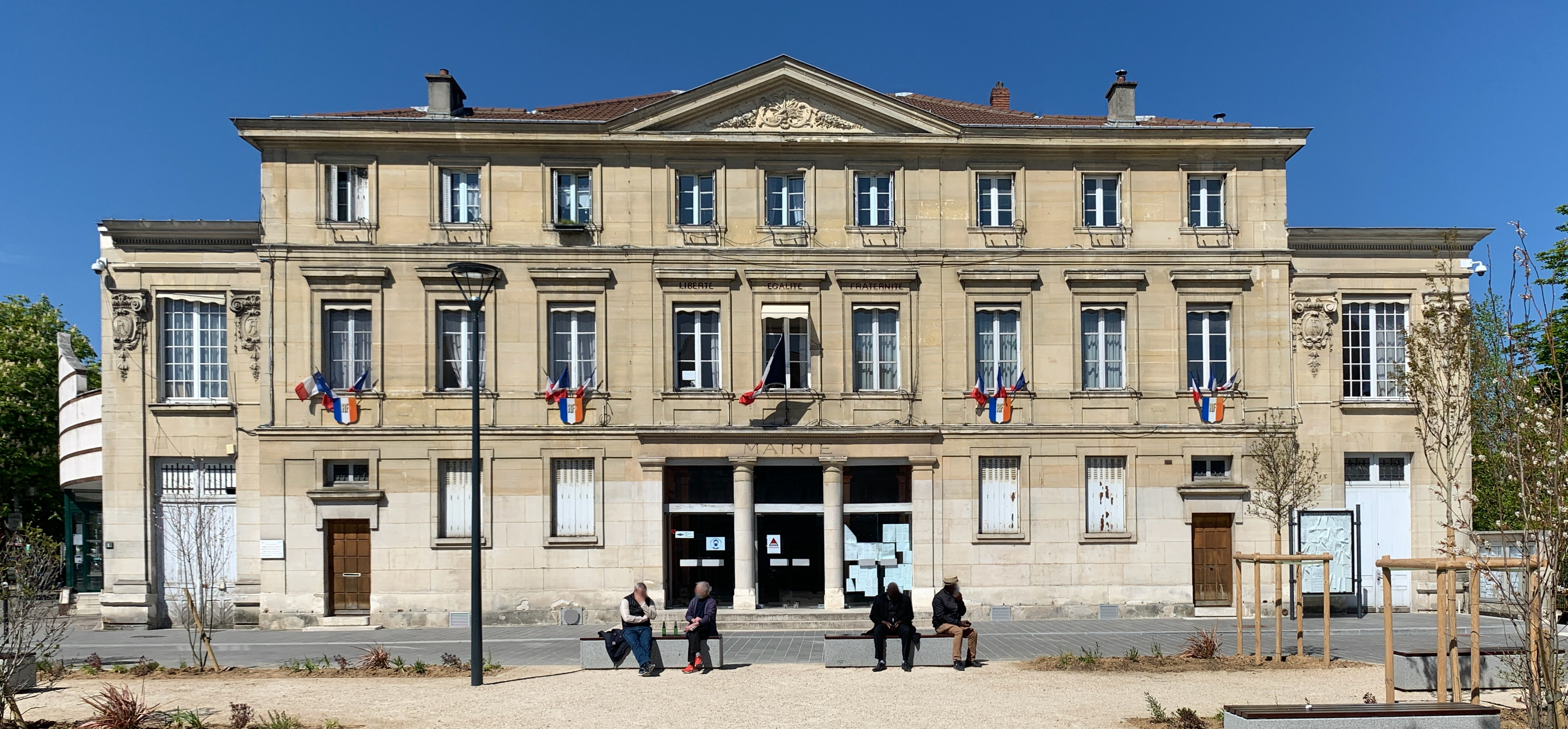
- The main frontage of the Hôtel de Ville in April 2021
- Interactive map of the Hôtel de Ville area

General information
- Type: City hall
- Architectural style: Neoclassical style
- Location: Romainville, France
- Coordinates: 48.8854°N 2.4354°E
- Completed: 1873

Design and construction
- Architect: Paul-Eugène Lequeux

The Hôtel de Ville (French pronunciation: [otɛl də vil], City Hall) is a municipal building in Romainville, Seine-Saint-Denis in the eastern suburbs of Paris, standing on Place de la Laïcité.

== History ==
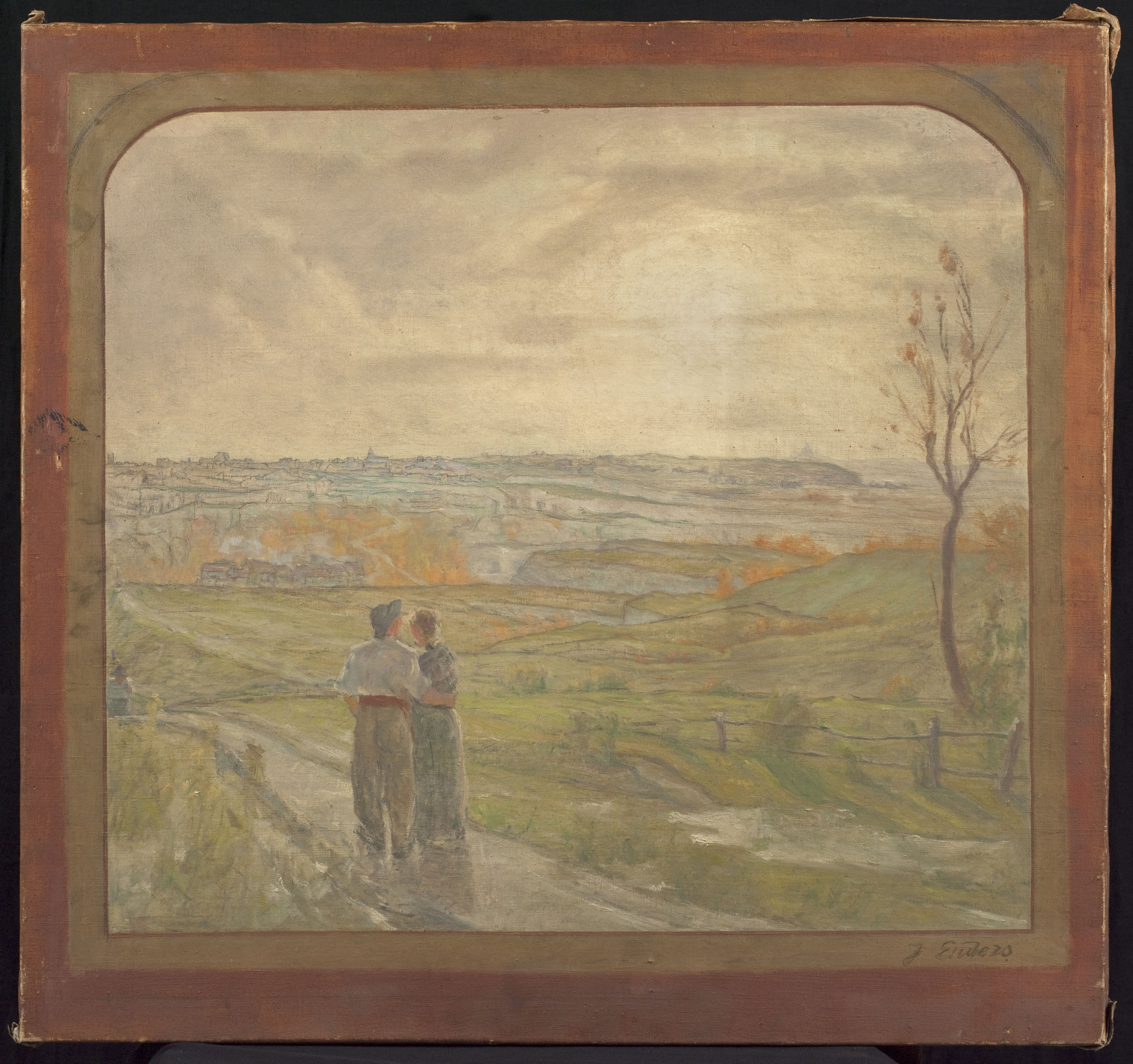
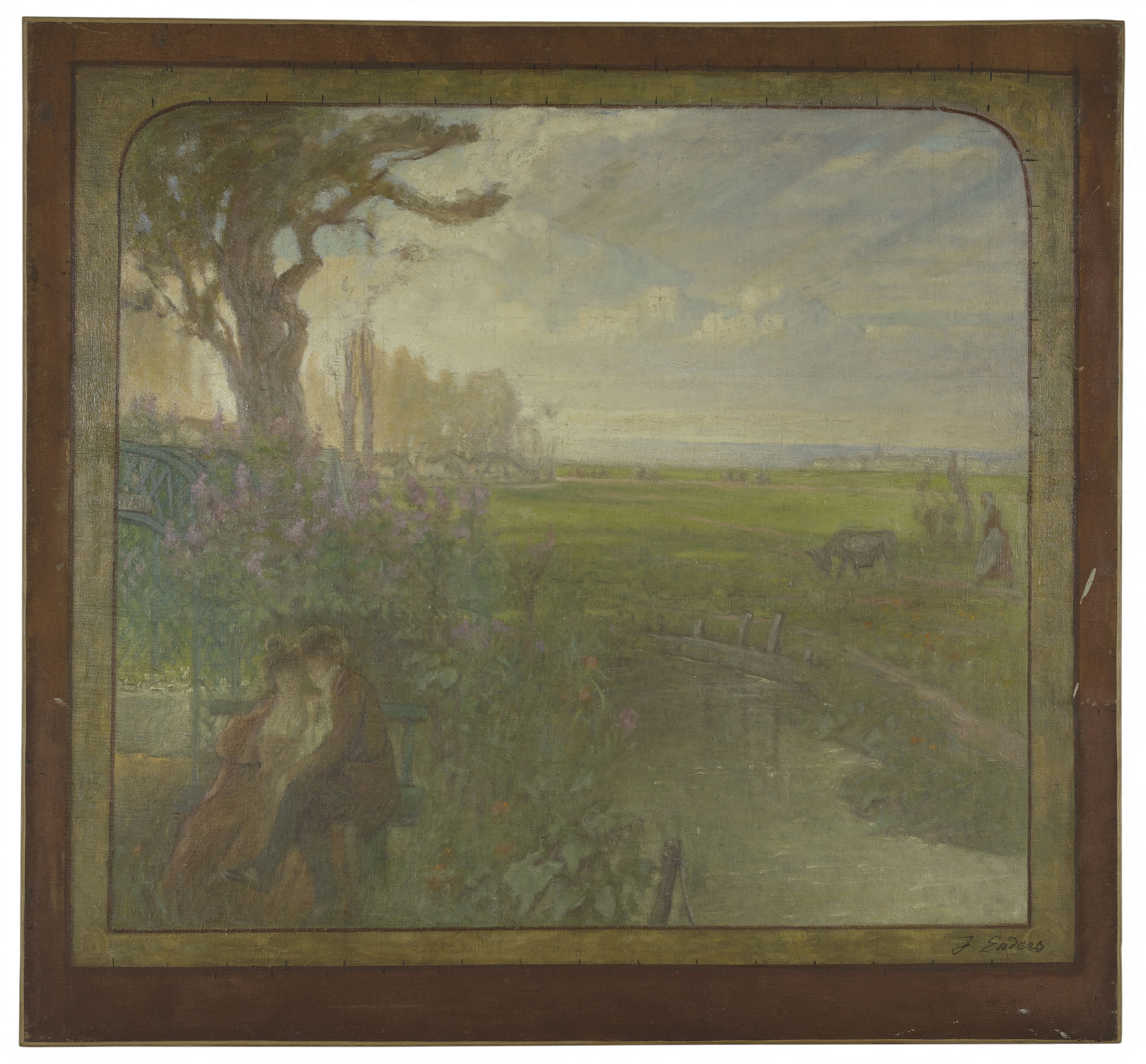
Murals by Jean-Joseph Enders c.1900

Following the French Revolution, the town council initially met in the house of the mayor at the time although public meetings were held in the Church of Saint-Germain-l'Auxerrois. This changed in the early-19th century, when a modest municipal office was established in a building on Place de l'Église (now Place de la Laïcité). In the 1820s, the town council decided to commission a dedicated town hall and in 1829, Paul de Noailles, 6th Duke of Noailles, whose seat was at the Château de Romainville, made a site available in the southeastern corner of his grounds. However, many of the wealthier residents of the town lobbied for a site further to the west. There were several unsuccessful attempts to resolve this before the western part of the town was detached to create the commune of Les Lilas in 1867. Although, this allowed the project to proceed on the site originally proposed, progress was further delayed by the intervention of the Franco-Prussian War in 1870.

Construction work on the new building started in 1871. It was designed by Paul-Eugène Lequeux in the neoclassical style, built in ashlar stone and was officially opened by the mayor, Émile Genevoix, on 20 December 1873. The design involved a symmetrical main frontage of nine bays facing onto Place de la Laïcité. The central section of three bays featured a wide opening formed by Doric order columns and pilasters supporting an entablature. There were three casement windows with cornices on the first floor and three smaller casement windows on the second floor, all surmounted by a pediment with fine carvings in the tympanum. The other bays were fenestrated in a similar style.

The building was extended by the addition of two small two-storey wings, to a design by Henri Viet, in 1905. Internally, the principal rooms were the Salle des Fêtes, which was decorated by Jean-Joseph Enders, and the Salle des Mariages (wedding room), which was decorated with four fine murals painted by Maton Wicart in 1917.

Following the Paris insurrection on 19 August 1944, during the Second World War, a police inspector, Louis de Riz, was shot dead by German troops in front of the town hall. This was a week before the official liberation of the town by the French 2nd Armoured Division, commanded by General Philippe Leclerc, on 25 August 1944.

The complex was extended along Avenue Paul-Vaillant-Couturier by the addition of an administration block, designed in the modern style in 1963.
