= Marianne Duvivier =

Belgian comic book artist

Marianne Duvivier (born 6 March 1958) is a Belgian comic book artist.

The daughter of the former right hand man to Patrice Lumumba, she was born in the former Belgian Congo and studied at the École supérieure des arts Saint-Luc in Brussels. Duvivier drew her first comic strips for the fanzine Oxygène. From 1984 to 1987, she drew the strip Stone for the magazine Circus, partnering with writer Jan Bucquoy.

== Selected work ==
- Lagune, L'abbaye des Dunes (1990), illustrator, written by Jacques de Pierpont
- Mauvaise Graine, series (1993-2001)
- L'Écharde (2004, 2006) 2 volumes in the series Secrets, script by Frank Giroud
- Heureuse vie, heureux combats in the series Secrets (2014)
