= Aude Massot =

French comics artist (born 1983)

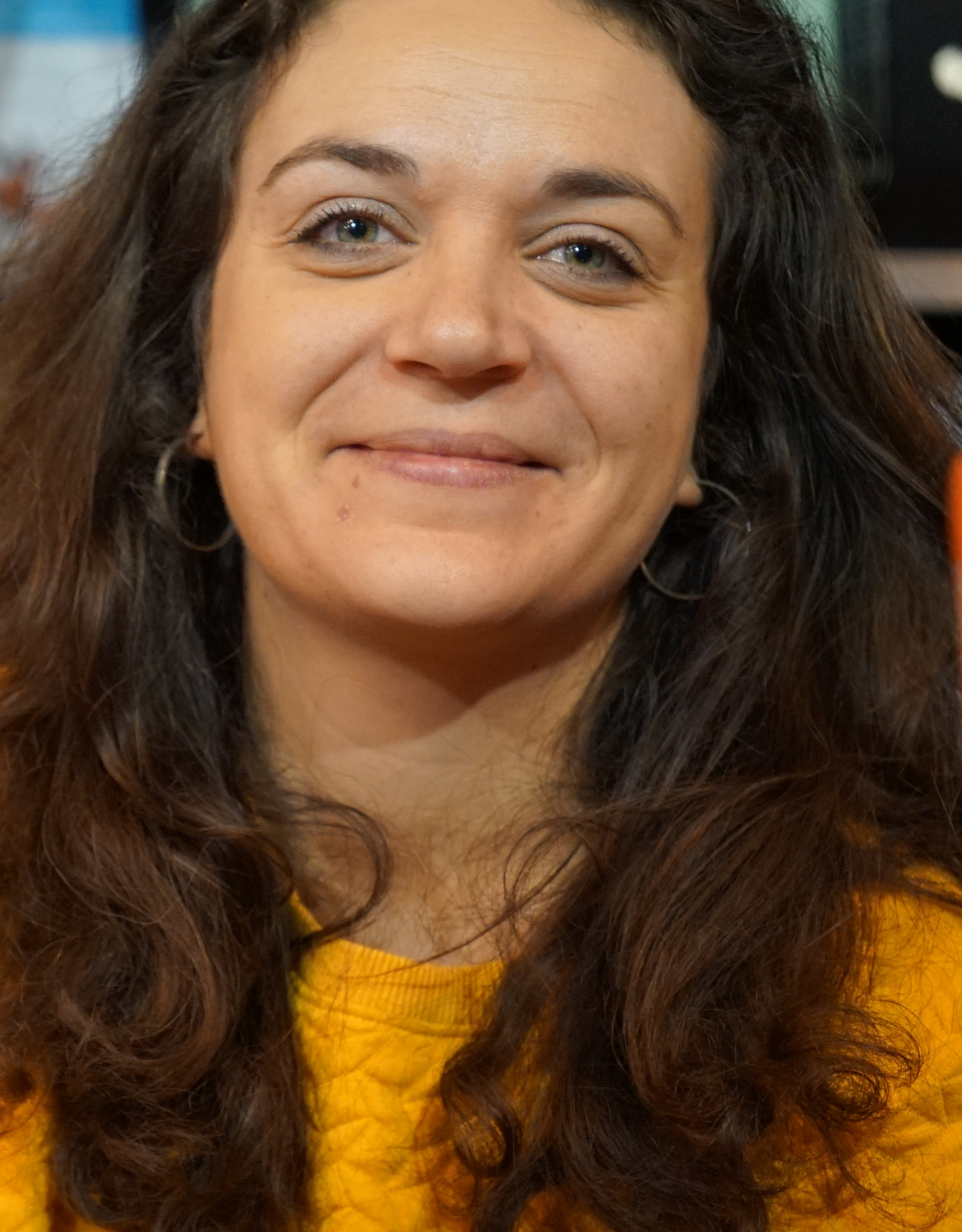
- Aude Massot at the Angoulême International Comics Festival (2017)
- Born: 27 September 1983 (age 42); Les Lilas, France
- Education: Institut Saint-Luc
- Notable work: Une saison à l'ONU, au cœur de la diplomatie mondiale
- Movement: Collective of female comics creators against sexism
- Awards: Shortlisted, France Info Prize (2019)
- Website: odemasso.ultra-book.com/accueil

Aude Massot (born 27 September 1983, Les Lilas) is a French bande dessinée comic book artist. She is a member of the Collective of female comics creators against sexism. Her non-fiction comics book with Karim Lebhour, Une saison à l'ONU, au cœur de la diplomatie mondiale (2018) was shortlisted for the France Info Prize (2019).

== Biography ==
Aude Massot studied for four years at the Institut Saint-Luc in Brussels, Belgium until 2006.

She then worked in Paris in advertising and animation. In 2009, she published her first album, Chronique d'une chair grillée (published by Les Enfants Rouges), which she drew on a script by Fabien Bertrand containing a "dark and cynical" narrative. With the same writer, she delivered La sulfureuse épopée des bandits Miki et Magda in 2011 and 2013, which, under a humorous angle, tells the story of a "couple of mythical robbers".

Next, Massot teamed up with Édouard Bourré-Guilbert and Pauline Bardin, who wrote the script for Massot's humorous Québec Land, published in 2014, which focuses on two young French expatriates. Originally from Le Mans, Bourré-Guilbert and Bardin moved to Montreal temporarily in 2011 and ran a column. They got in touch with Massot, who also spent time in Montreal. The episodes were broadcast for free on Delitoon for several months and met with some success before Éditions Sarbacane proposed a publication.

By herself, Massot undertakes non-fiction comics for SAMU Social, published by Steinkis Groupe in 2017, Chronique du 115, une histoire du Samu social. Inspired by the stories of a social worker, she meets and accompanies Xavier Emmanuelli while he does his work within SAMU Social.

She continued in the same documentary vein by collaborating with Karim Lebhour, Radio France Internationale's UN correspondent from 2010 to 2014, for a comic book about the United Nations, Une saison à l'ONU, au cœur de la diplomatie mondiale (2018). The book was reviewed by various media, such as Le Monde, France Inter, La Croix, ActuaBD, BoDoï, BD Gest', and Le Petit Journal. The album was shortlisted for the France Info Prize (2019).

== Selected works ==
- Chronique d'une chair grillée (design by Massot; script by Fabien Bertrand), Les Enfants Rouges, coll. "Coquelicot", 2009 ISBN 978-2-354-19019-4
- La sulfureuse épopée des bandits Miki et Magda (design by Massot; script by Fabien Bertrand), Les Enfants Rouges, coll. "Coquelicot"
1. La propagande par le fait, 2011 ISBN 978-2-354-19046-0
2. Quand la croix brûle, 2013 ISBN 978-2-354-19054-5
- Québec land (design by Massot; script by Édouard Bourré-Guilbert and Pauline Bardin), Éditions Sarbacane, 2014 ISBN 978-2-84865-707-3
- Chronique du 115, Steinkis Groupe, 2017 ISBN 978-2-368-46022-1
- Une saison à l'ONU, au cœur de la diplomatie mondiale (design by Massot; script by Karim Lebhour), Steinkis, 2018 ISBN 978-2-368-46128-0
- Robinson à Pékin (design by Massot; script by Éric Meyer), Urban Comics, 2021
- Ouagadougou Pressé (design by Massot; script by Roukiata Ouedraogo), Sarbacane, 2021
- Les grandes et les petites choses (design by Massot; script by Rachel Khan), Nathan bandes dessinées, 2022
