= Hôtel de Ville, Les Lilas =

Town hall in Les Lilas, France

Hôtel de Ville
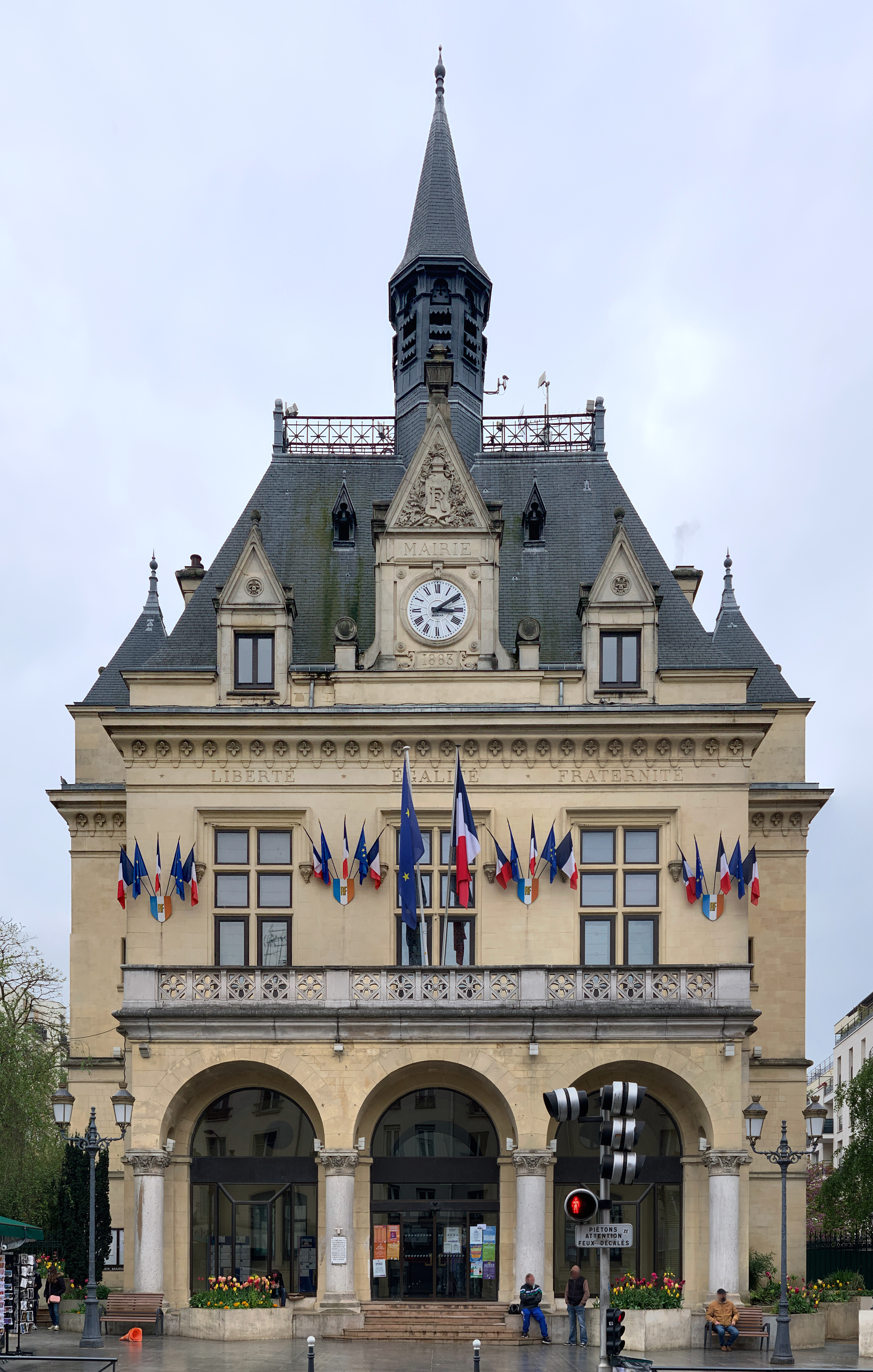
- The main frontage of the Hôtel de Ville in May 2021
- Interactive map of the Hôtel de Ville area

General information
- Type: City hall
- Architectural style: Neoclassical style
- Location: Les Lilas, France
- Coordinates: 48.8793°N 2.4158°E
- Completed: 1884

Design and construction
- Architect: Paul Héneux

The Hôtel de Ville (French pronunciation: [otɛl də vil], City Hall) is a municipal building in Les Lilas, Seine-Saint-Denis, in the northeastern suburbs of Paris, standing on Rue de Paris.

== History ==
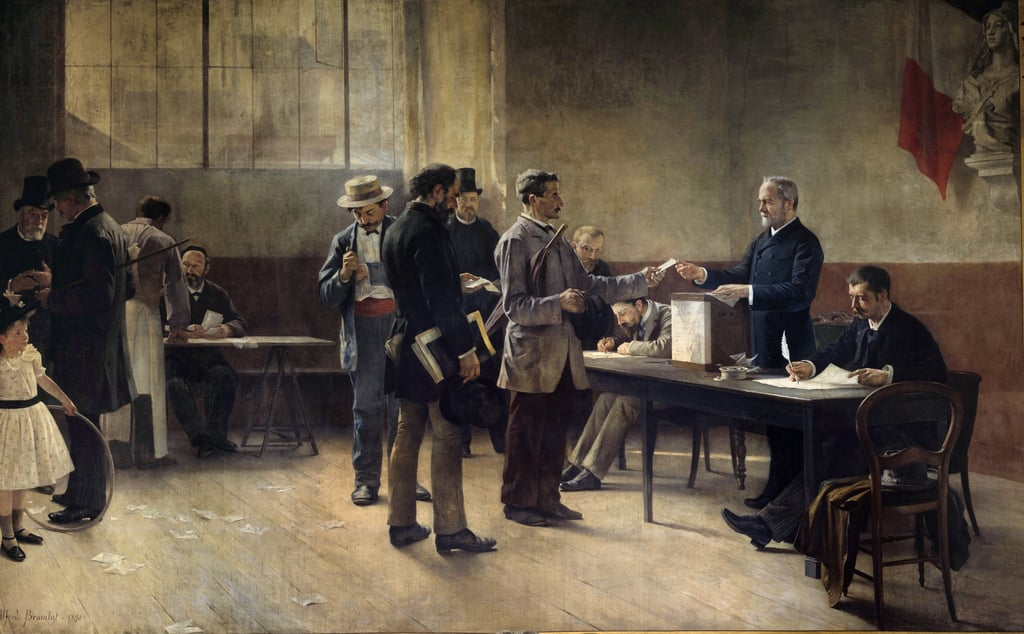
Painting by Alfred-Henri Bramtot depicting universal suffrage

After the commune of Les Lilas was created by detaching parts of Romainville, Pantin and Bagnolet in 1867, the new council led by the mayor, Victor Guérin-Delaroche, looked for a place in which to hold meetings. They initially rented offices on the ground floor at No. 45 Rue de Paris and then in a private house at No. 100 Rue de Paris. In June 1880, after finding this arrangement inadequate, the council led by the mayor, Edmond Jacquet, decided to commission a dedicated town hall. The site they selected, at No. 96 Rue de Paris, was acquired from Messrs Hurbe, Rozière, and Mallet for FFr 15,500. The foundation stone for the new building was laid by the Prefect of the Seine, Eugène Poubelle, on 19 August 1883. It was designed by Paul Héneux in the neoclassical style, built in ashlar stone and was officially opened by the mayor, François-Anselme Péan, in 1884.

The design involved a symmetrical main frontage of five bays with the end bays recessed. The central section of three bays featured a short flight of steps leading up to three round-headed openings formed by Ionic order columns, decorated with lilac flowers, supporting voussoirs. There were three mullioned and transomed windows on the first floor and a stone balcony in front. At roof level, there was a frieze, a cornice and a parapet surmounted by a clock with a tall triangular pediment flanked by a pair of dormer windows. Behind the clock, there a steep roof with an octagonal lantern. Internally, the principal room was the Salle de Conseil (council chamber).

During the Paris insurrection, part of the Second World War, members of the French Resistance seized the town hall on 17 August 1944. This was eight days before the official liberation of the town by the French 2nd Armoured Division, commanded by General Philippe Leclerc, on 25 August 1944.

Works of art in the building include a painting in the council chamber by Alfred-Henri Bramtot depicting universal suffrage and a painting on the grand staircase by Jean-Léon Gérôme depicting The French Republic. There are also canvases by Édouard Vimont depicting youth and family.
