= Audrey Spiry =

French animator, illustrator, and author (born 1983)

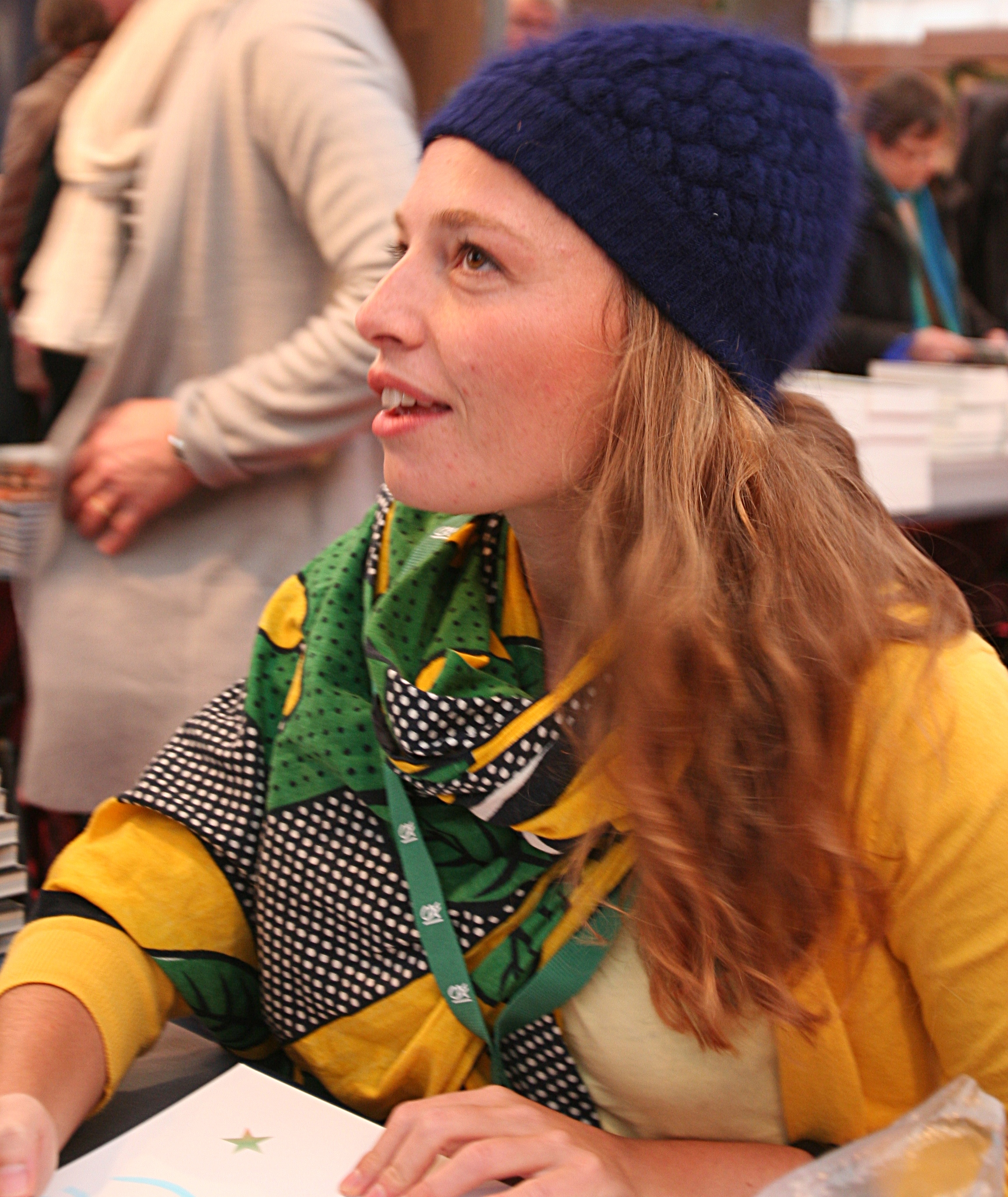
- Audrey Spiry during Quai des Bulles (Saint-Malo, 27 October 2012)
- Born: 17 May 1983 (age 43) France
- Areas: animator; illustrator; bande dessinée author
- Notable works: L'Expédition
- Awards: Prix Sorcières

Audrey Spiry (born 17 May 1983) is a French animator, illustrator, and comic strip author. Her first album, En silence, was released in 2012. L’expédition was honoured with the Prix Sorcières, category Carrément Beau Maxi (2023). She is a member of Collective of female comics creators against sexism and works in animation.

== Biography ==
Audrey Spiry's father was a magician. She first studied design at the École nationale supérieure des arts appliqués et des métiers d'art, before enrolling at the École des métiers du cinéma d'animation and finally, at the School of Beaux-Arts.

Her first comic strip album, En silence, (Casterman, 2012) took her two and a half years to complete. The work, drawn with "bright colors treated with the digital palette with a gouache effect", concerns characters who spend a day of canyoning. The album was one of the five finalists for the Prix de la BD du Point (2012) and the Grand Prix de la critique (2013). The work was favorably received in several media and was translated into Italian in 2016.

Spiry participates in the collective work Les Gens normaux, paroles lesbiennes gay bi trans (Casterman), directed by Hubert Boulard and containing testimonials and reference texts; the book was published in 2013. Subsequently, Spiry illustrated children's books. Spiry drew Lotte, fille pirate, on a screenplay by Sandrine Bonini; it appeared in Éditions Sarbacane in 2014. With the same screenwriter, she created Tempête (2015).

In 2022, she illustrated the children's book L'Expédition, based on a text by Stéphane Servant. The work won the Prix Sorcières 2023, in the Carrément Beau Maxi category.

== Awards and honours ==
- 2012, Finalist of the "Prix de la BD du Point", for En silence
- 2013, Finalist for the Prix de la critique, for En Silence
- 2023, Prix Sorcières, category Carrément Beau Maxi, for L’expédition, text by Stéphane Servant

== Selected works ==
=== Bande dessinée ===
- En silence, text, drawing, and colors, Casterman, collection KSTR, 2012 (ISBN 978-2-203-03272-9); translated into Italian by Elisabetta Tramacere for Diabolo Edizioni, 2016.
- In fine : résidence du 15 septembre au 15 octobre 2020, confinement 2, text and drawing, Editions of the Parc naturel régional de la Narbonnaise en Méditerranée, 2021

=== Drawing ===
- Lotte, fille pirate, text by Sandrine Bonini, Sarbacane, 2014 (ISBN 978-2-84865-702-8)
- Tempête, text by Sandrine Bonini, Sarbacane, 2015 (ISBN 978-2-84865-804-9)
- En ce temps-là, text by Gaia Guasti, Éditions Thierry Magnier, collection “Les Décadrés” 2016 (ISBN 978-2-36474-909-2)
- L'Expédition, text by Stéphane Servant, Thierry Magnier editions, 2022
