= Lycée Paul Robert =

Lycée Paul-Robert
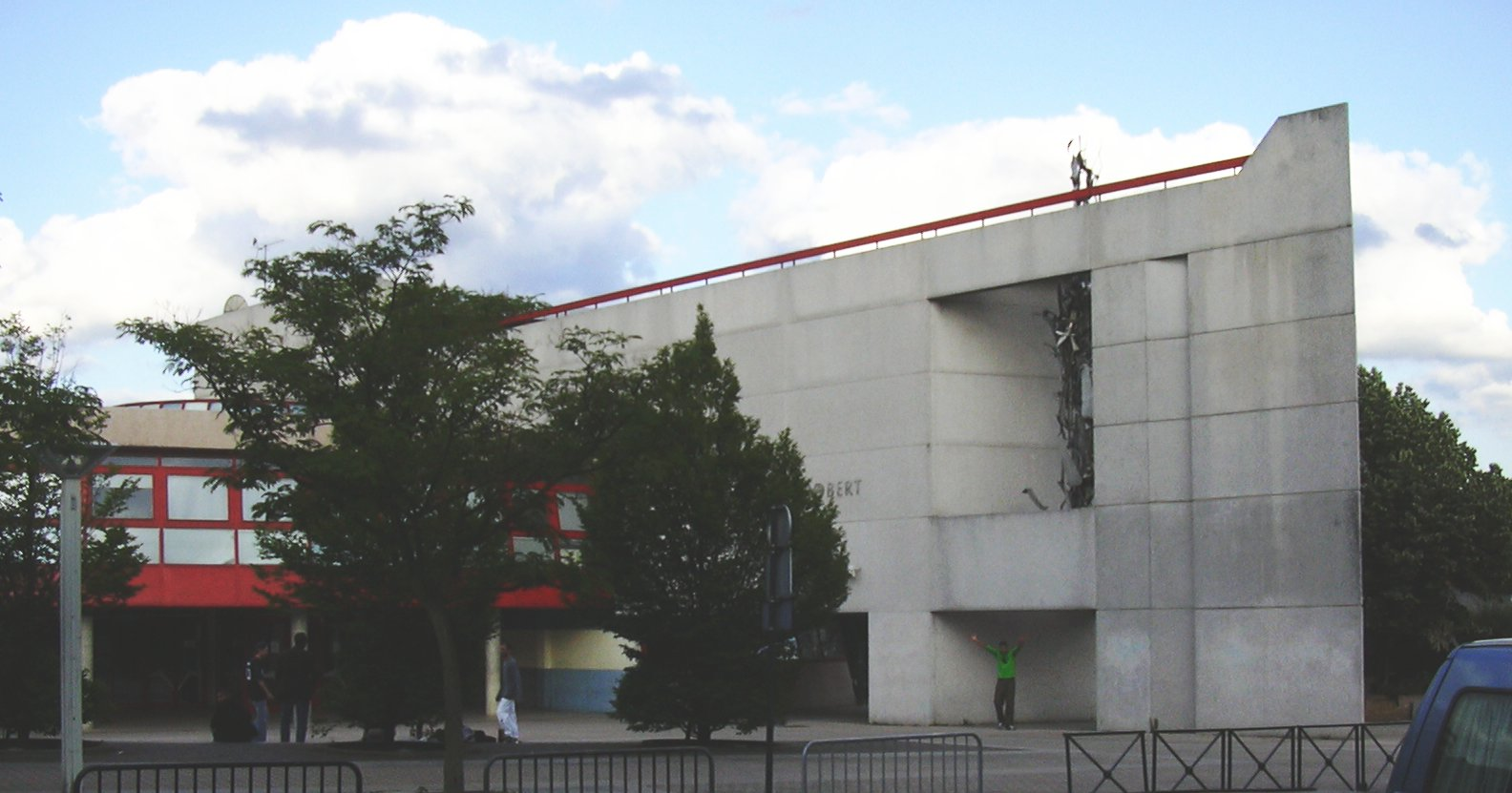

Information
- Type: Public high school

Lycée Paul Robert is a senior high school in Les Lilas, Seine-Saint-Denis, France, in the Paris metropolitan area. It is located in the Creteil Academy, that includes the departments of Seine-Saint-Denis and Seine-et-Marne

As of 2018 it has about 800 students. It opened in 1994. Roger Taillibert was the building's architect. He decides to build a building, which reminds one of a boat.
