= Barly Baruti =

Congolese comics artist

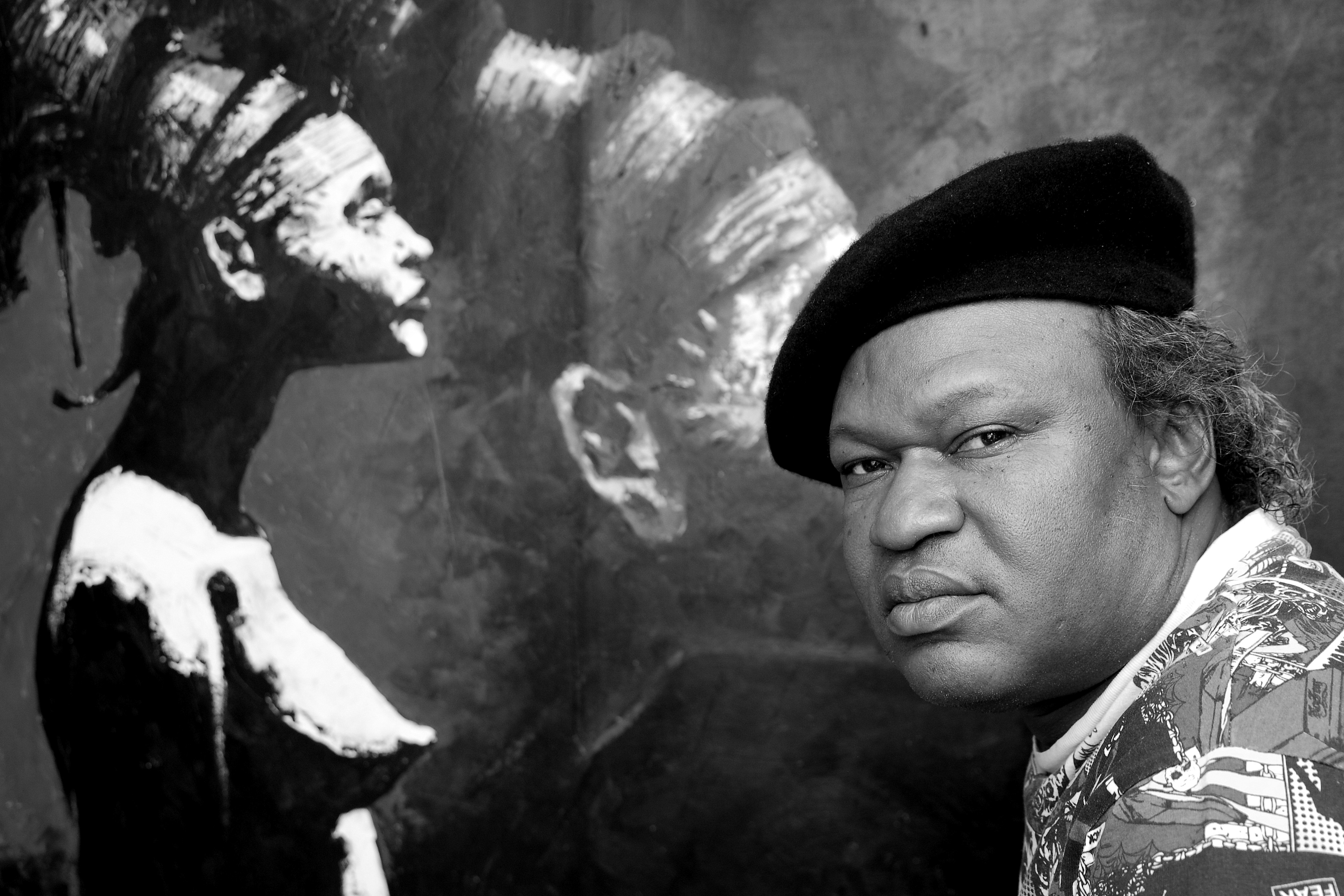
- Born: Baruti Kandolo Lilela; December 9, 1959 (age 66) Kisangani, Congo-Léopoldville
- Areas: Writer, Artist
- Pseudonym: Barly Baruti
- Notable works: Eva K, Mandrill

Baruti Kandolo Lilela, better known by his pen name Barly Baruti (born December 9, 1959, in Kisangani, in what was then the Congo-Léopoldville), is a Congolese (DRC) cartoonist. He has been described by the British Broadcasting Corporation as "the Congolese author best known outside his country".

== Biography ==
He studied pedagogy, then worked at the graphics studio of the French Cultural Centre in Kisangani. There, in 1982, he wrote and drew his first published comic, Le Temps d'agir (Time to Act), on environmental issues. In 1984, having won a comics competition, he was invited to study comics writing in Angoulême (France), then in 1987 worked for a few months at the Studios Hergé in Brussels. He returned to Congo, where he published several albums, then moved to Belgium in 1992. In 1994, the Cultural Centre in Kisangani published his album Objectif Terre! (Objective: Earth!), an environmental manifesto. In the late 1990s, he co-produced Eva K, a trilogy of comics albums, with Frank Giroud, followed by Mandrill, a series of seven albums. For these works, Baruti "replaced his semi-humorous clear line style with a more realistic one".

In December 2010, he was invited to participate in the first international exhibition of African comics, in Paris.

Baruti is the co-founder of the Atelier de Création et de l'Initiation à l'Art (Creative Workshop for an Initiation to Art) to encourage talented youth in Kinshasa.
