= Lisa Mandel =

French comics artist (born 1977)

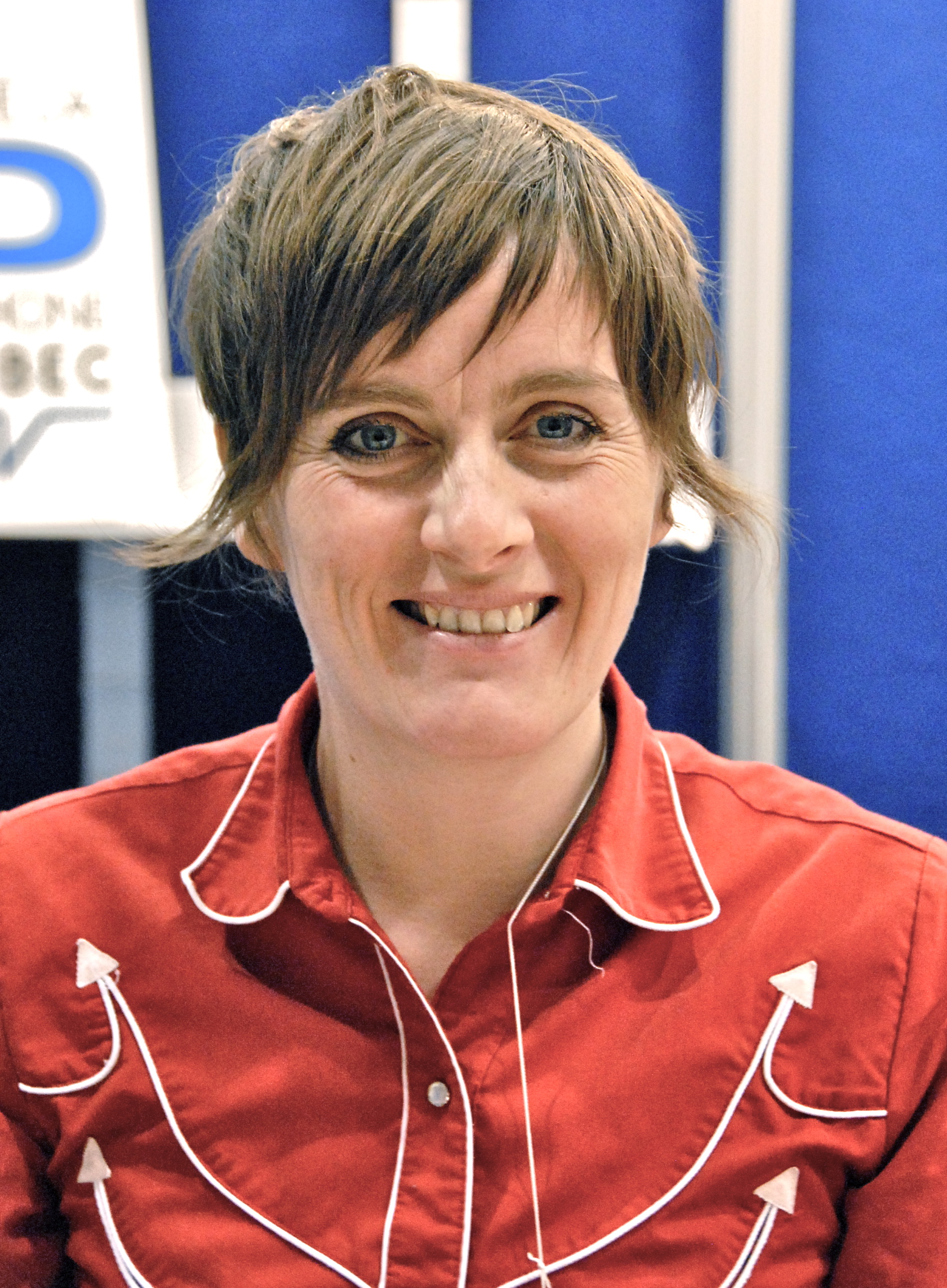
- Lisa Mandel, at the Salon international du livre de Québec, 2012
- Born: 23 April 1977 (age 49) Marseille, France
- Areas: Writer, Publisher
- Pseudonym: Lisa
- Notable works: Nini Patalo

Lisa Mandel (known as, Lisa; born 23 April 1977, Marseille) is a French bande dessinée comic book author. With Jul Maroh, Mandel co-founded the Collective of female comics creators against sexism (2015). In 2021, Mandel launched the Exemplaire publishing house, with the subtitle, La maison qui édite autrement (The house that publishes differently).

== Early life and education ==
Lisa Mandel joined the Lycée Denis Diderot in Marseille at the age of 15, to take a baccalaureate in Applied Arts, from which she graduated in 1995 to enter the École supérieure des arts décoratifs in Strasbourg. It was during her studies that she began to collaborate with various magazines at Milan Presse, such as Julie and Les Clés de l'actualité junior as well as the magazine Tchô! for which she regularly produces small strips and cartoons.

== Career ==
In 2001, she graduated and created the series Nini Patalo in the magazine Tchô!, and in the monthly Capsule cosmique, she imagined the character dʼEddy Milveux. These are her two youth series. In 2007, at the Salon du livre et de la presse jeunesse of Montreuil, Seine-Saint-Denis, the series Nini Patalo received the Prix Tam-Tam in the category bande dessinée for its volume 4, L'important c'est de gagner. Since 2010, Nini Patalo is adapted into an animated series by the animation studio Je suis bien content and is broadcast on channels such as France 3 or Canal J.

In the creation of Esthétique et filatures, Mandel collaborated with Tanxxx in the drawing, and in 2009, the authors received the Prix Artémisia for women's comics, and also the Prix de la meilleure BD adaptable au cinéma et à la télévision at the Forum international cinéma et écritures de Monaco. The album was in the official selection of the 2009 Angoulême International Comics Festival.

Since 2009, Mandel has been working on a series HP, published by L'Association, in which she explores the world of psychiatric hospitals through the testimony of her mother and father-in-law, psychiatric nurses for 35 years in a large hospital in Marseille.

She was a juror at the 2014 Angoulême International Comics Festival, alongside Bernard Willem Holtrop as president of the jury. In 2015, with Jul Maroh, Mandel co-founded the Collective of female comics creators against sexism, a protest movement against the marginalization of women authors. In January 2018, the collective gathered more than 250 signatories.

In 2016, with the sociologist Yasmine Bouagga, she launched the collection Sociorama at Casterman, whose principle is to adapt in comics the research of sociologists, such as the construction sites, the pornography industry, the flight crew, and the street pickers. Mandel herself created an opus within the collection, La Fabrique pornographique, based on the book by sociologist Mathieu Trachman, Le Travail pornographique. She also produces a humorous strip once a week, La Famille Mifa, in the mobile app la Matinale of the newspaper Le Monde.

From February to October 2016, Mandel and Bouagga followed the daily life of migrants in the Calais Jungle through a blog, Les Nouvelles de la jungle. In 2017, the comic book Les Nouvelles de la jungle de Calais was published by Casterman. The book was awarded the Coup de Coeur prize 2017 by the Centre national de la littérature pour la jeunesse, which wrote in its review: "this comic book offers a real historical perspective and a remarkable dive into the complexity of the problem. The satirical treatment of the drawing does not prevent a nuanced commentary, which provokes reflection on complex humanitarian, political and social issues16." The newspaper Le Figaro states: "Deplorable living conditions, personal stories, fear of the mafia, muscular dismantling or inter-community struggles... Lisa Mandel and Yasmine Bouagga have decided to tell the story of the "jungle" in a humorous way, without voyeurism or misery." For the critic of the newspaper Télérama, the authors sign an "enlightening collection of pedagogical, humanistic chronicles, both heartbreaking and funny."

In 2017, Mandel and the political scientist Julie Pagis met with children aged 7 to 11 in an elementary school to complete their blog on the presidential campaign. Mandel expresses the reactions and sometimes the disgust of these children from the Parisian suburbs in comic strips published in the daily newspaper Le Monde, with a rather childish and humorous tone. Since 2017, Mandel has often traveled to Lebanon and has also produced a comic book diary, Un automne à Beyrouth (Delcourt, 2018).

In 2019, Mandel began the webcomic series, Une année exemplaire, where she tries to overcome her addictions in one year, producing one page per day. This project was funded by a subscription. The entirety of the plates is published on the artist's Twitter, Instagram, and Facebook accounts. The work is in the selection for the 2021 Angoulême International Comics Festival Prize for Best Album.

In response to the pauperization of comic book authors, Mandel launched the Exemplaire publishing house in November 2020, based on participatory financing.

== Awards and honours ==
- 2007, Prix Tam-Tam, of the Montreuil book and youth press fair for the fourth album of Nini Patalo
- 2009 : Prix Artémisia de la bande dessinée féminine, with Tanxxx, for Esthétique et filatures
- 2009, Prix de la meilleure bd adaptable au cinéma et à la télévision for Esthétiques et filatures at the Monaco International Film and Writing Forum
- 2009, Official Selection, Festival d'Angoulême for Esthétique et filatures
- 2011, Nugget, Best Television Series, Montreuil Book and Youth Press Fair for the adaptation Nini Patalo (directed by Boris Guilloteau; scriptwriters, Lisa Mandel and Laurent Sarfati)
- 2012, Official Selection, Festival international du film d'animation d'Annecy for one episode of the television series, Nini Patalo
- 2017, Favorite, from the National Center for Children's Literature (BnF) for Les Nouvelles de la jungle de Calais, with Yasmine Bouagga

=== Event participations ===
- 2014, Jury, Angoulême Festival, alongside Bernard Willem Holtrop as president of the jury

== Selected works ==
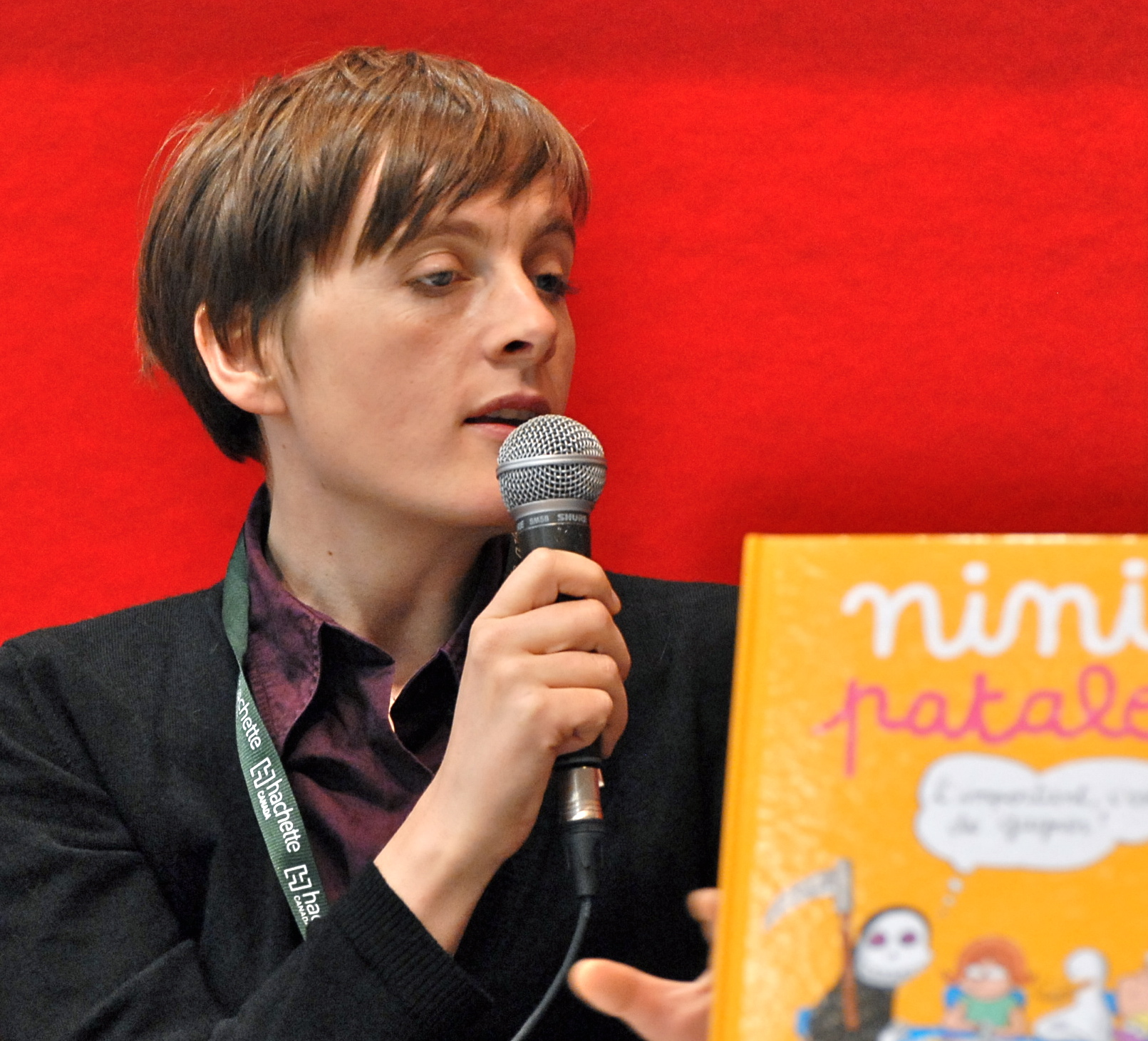
Lisa Mandel at the Salon international du livre de Québec, 2010

- Nini Patalo, Glénat
  1. Où sont passés mes parents ?, 2003 ISBN 2-7234-4184-9
  2. C'est parti mon Kiki !, 2004 ISBN 2-7234-4493-7
  3. Catch, espace et poireaux, 2005 ISBN 2-7234-5042-2
  4. L'Important c'est de gagner, 2006 ISBN 978-2723454094
  5. Coucou nous revoilou !!, 2009 ISBN 978-2-7234-5901-3
- Eddy Milveux, Milan
  1. Attention, blatte magique !, 2004 ISBN 2-7459-1424-3
  2. Eddy dans tous ses états !, 2005 ISBN 2-7459-1612-2
  3. À tes souhaits, 2015 ISBN 978-2-7459-5741-2
- Le Moustique qui voulait devenir célèbre, script by Olivier Ka, Lire c'est Partir, 2003
- L'Île du professeur mémé, drawing by Julien Hippolyte, Milan, 2006 ISBN 2-7459-1883-4
- Libre comme un poney sauvage, Delcourt, 2006 ISBN 2-7560-0410-3
- Boule de neige (collective), Delcourt, 2007
- Princesse aime princesse, Gallimard, collection Bayou, 2008 ISBN 978-2-07-057298-4
- Esthétique et filatures, drawing by Tanxxx, Casterman, collection KSTR, 2008 (Official Selection, Festival d'Angoulême 2009) ISBN 978-2-203-003996
- Brune Platine, drawing by Marion Mousse, Casterman, 2013
- HP, L'Association, collection Espôlette
  1. L'Asile d'aliénés, 2009 ISBN 978-2-84414-316-7
  2. Crazy Seventies, 2013 ISBN 978-2-84414-417-1
- Vertige, drawing by Hélène Georges, Casterman, 2012 ISBN 2-203-02589-1
- Mon lapin, issue no. 5 (collective), L'Association, 2014 ISBN 9782844144980
- Comicscope of David Rault (collectifve), l'Apocalypse, 2013
- Super Rainbow, Casterman, collection Professeur Cyclope, 2015 ISBN 978-2-203-09177-1
- La Fabrique pornographique, co-scriptwriter with Mathieu Trachman, Casterman, collection Sociorama, 2016 ISBN 978-2-203-09529-8
- Je me défends du harcèlement, text by Emmanuelle Piquet, Albin Michel Jeunesse, 2016
- Les Nouvelles de la jungle de Calais, co-scriptwriter with Yasmine Bouagga, Casterman, collection Sociorama, 2017
- La Famille Mifa, Glénat, 2017
- Prézizidentielle, co-scriptwriter with Julie Pagis, Casterman, collection Sociorama, 2017 ISBN 978-2-203-14962-5
- Un automne à Beyrouth, Delcourt, collection Shampooing, 2018 ISBN 978-2-413-00897-2
- Je me défends du sexisme, text by Emmanuelle Piquet, Albin Michel Jeunesse, 2018 ISBN 978-2-226-43515-6
- Je combats ce qui m’empêche d’apprendre, text by Emmanuelle Piquet, Albin Michel Jeunesse, 2019
- Allez les filles !, text by Emmanuelle Piquet, Albin Michel Jeunesse, 2020
- Une année exemplaire, self-published, 2020 ISBN 978-2-9573148-0-5
- Se rétablir, Exemplaire
  1. Volume 1, 2022 ISBN 978-2-492926-03-7 - Official Selection of Festival d'Angoulême 2023
