= Isabelle Dethan =

French comic book artist

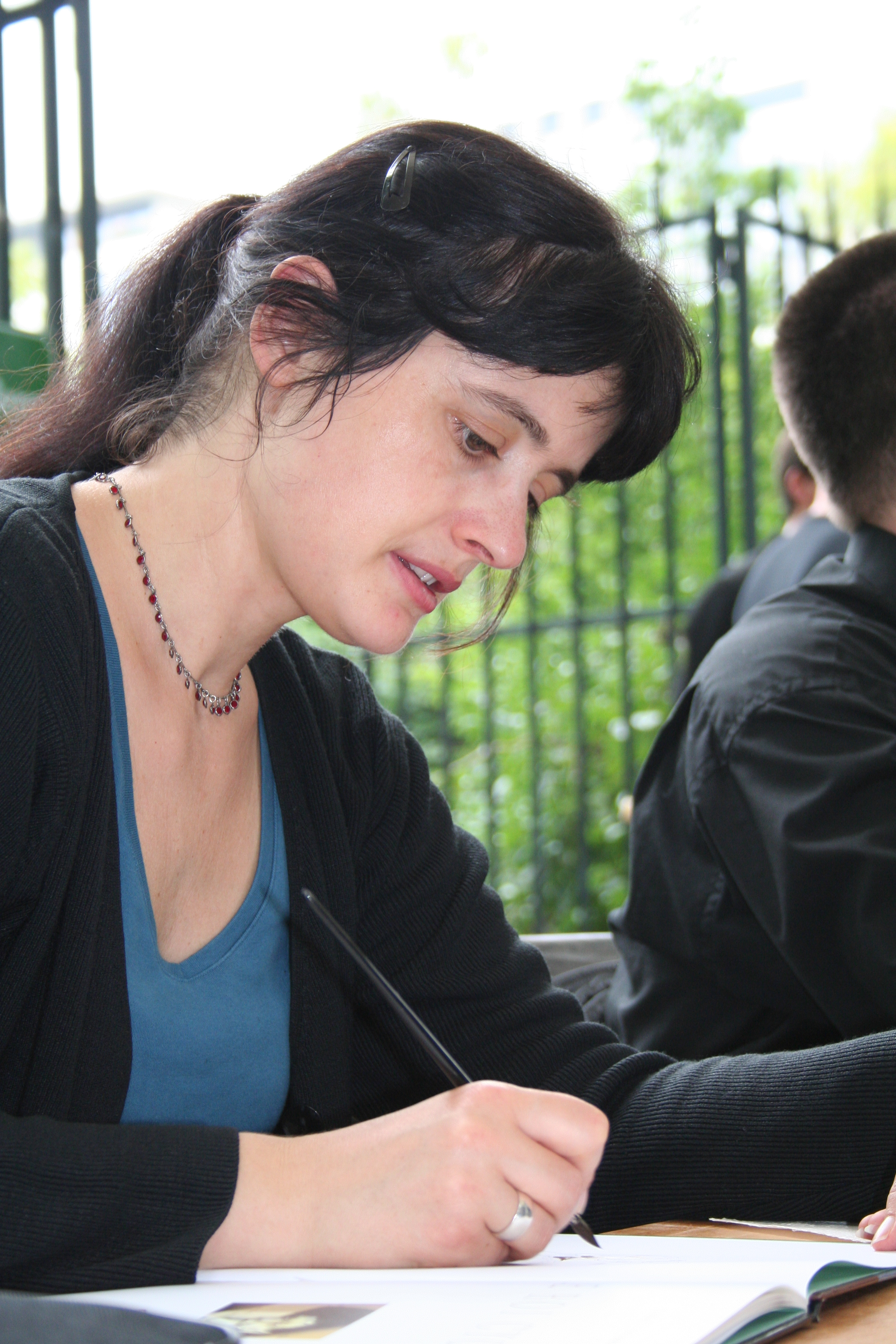
- Born: 28 December 1967 (age 58); Bègles, France
- Known for: comic book art

Isabelle Dethan (born 28 December 1967) is a French comic book artist.

She was born in Bègles, France and received a master's degree in literature and a Certificat d'aptitude au professorat de l'enseignement du second degré in library technology.

Her first comic was published in the German magazine Schwermetall. In 1992, Dethan received the Alph'Art Avenir prize at the Angoulême International Comics Festival. In 1993, she began her trilogy Mémoire de Sable. She is a contributor to the magazine Je bouquine. Dethan has also created a graphic novel based on Alice's Adventures in Wonderland.

In 2019, the Bédéciné festival in Illzach awarded her the grand prize; she became the first president of the festival.

In 2020, the Pôle Image Magelis awarded her a prize.

== Selected work ==
- Le Roi Cyclope, series (1997-)
- Tante Henriette ou l'Éloge de l'avarice (2000)
- Sur les terres d'Horus, series (2001-)
- Ingrid, series (2001-)
- Khéti, fils du Nil, series (2006-), with Mazan
- Le Tombeau d'Alexandre, series (2008-) with Julien Maffre
- Les Ombres du Styx, series (2011-)
