= Romainville =

- Commune
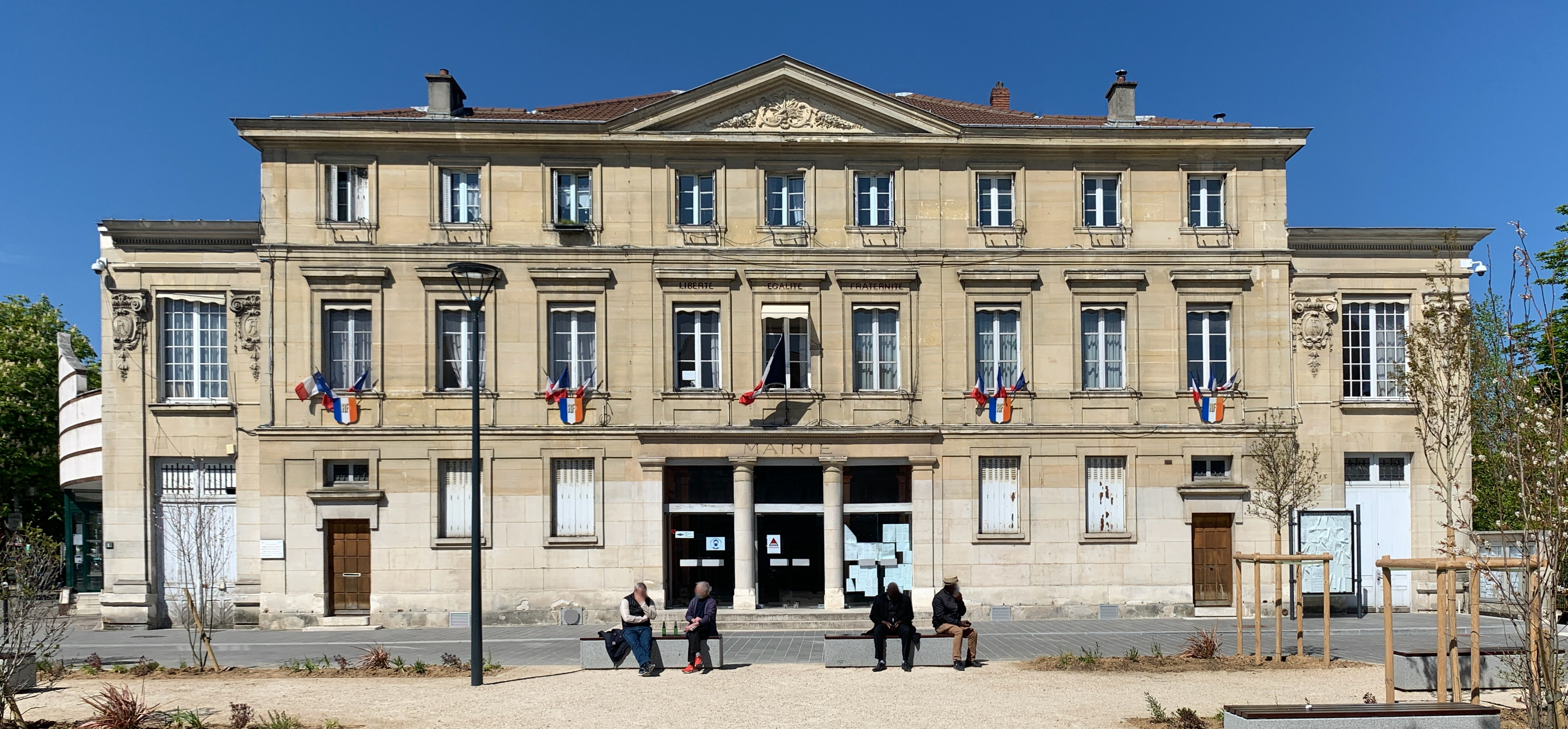
- The Hôtel de Ville, Romainville

- Coat of arms

- Location (in red) within Paris inner suburbs
- Location of Romainville
- Location within France Location within Île-de-France (region)
- Coordinates: 48°53′02″N 2°26′06″E
- Country: France
- Region: Île-de-France
- Department: Seine-Saint-Denis
- Arrondissement: Bobigny
- Canton: Bagnolet
- Intercommunality: Grand Paris

Government
  - Mayor (2026–32): François Dechy
- Area^{1}: 3.44 km^{2} (1.33 sq mi)
- Elevation: 117 m (384 ft)
- Population (2023): 37,152
  - Density: 10,800/km^{2} (28,000/sq mi)
- Time zone: UTC+01:00 (CET)
  - Summer (DST): UTC+02:00 (CEST)
- INSEE/Postal code: 93063 /93230
- ^{1} French Land Register data, which excludes lakes, ponds, glaciers > 1 km^{2} (0.386 sq mi or 247 acres) and river estuaries.

Romainville (French pronunciation: [ʁɔmɛ̃vil]) is a commune in the Seine-Saint-Denis department, located in the eastern suburbs of Paris, France.

== Location ==
It is located 7.2 km (4.5 mi) from the center of Paris.

== History ==
The name Romainville derives from Latin, and means 'Roman village'.

On 24 July 1867, a part of the territory of Romainville was detached and merged with a part of the territory of Pantin and a part of the territory of Bagnolet to create the commune of Les Lilas. The Hôtel de Ville was completed in 1873.

== Population ==
Historical population

Year	Pop.	±% p.a.
1793	1,011	—
1800	908	−1.52%
1806	1,035	+2.21%
1821	839	−1.39%
1831	1,012	+1.89%
1836	1,222	+3.84%
1841	1,672	+6.47%
1846	1,597	−0.91%
1851	1,499	−1.26%
1856	2,083	+6.80%
1861	4,289	+15.54%
1866	4,907	+2.73%
1872	2,044	−13.58%
1876	2,025	−0.23%
1881	1,854	−1.75%
1886	2,106	+2.58%
1891	2,106	+0.00%
1896	2,408	+2.72%
1901	2,961	+4.22%

Year	Pop.	±% p.a.
1906	4,472	+8.60%
1911	5,676	+4.88%
1921	8,087	+3.60%
1926	12,821	+9.65%
1931	18,449	+7.55%
1936	18,422	−0.03%
1946	17,022	−0.79%
1954	19,217	+1.53%
1962	23,494	+2.54%
1968	24,091	+0.42%
1975	26,260	+1.24%
1982	25,363	−0.50%
1990	23,563	−0.92%
1999	23,779	+0.10%
2007	25,563	+0.91%
2012	25,411	−0.12%
2017	27,567	+1.64%
2023	37,152	+5.10%

Source: EHESS and INSEE (1968-2023)

== Transport ==
Romainville is served by three station of the Paris Métro, which are Serge Gainsbourg, Romainville-Carnot, Montreuil-Hôpital. Also not far is Bobigny - Pantin - Raymond Queneau station on Paris Métro Line 5.

== Education ==
As of 2016 there were 1,147 preschool (maternelle) students and 1,637 elementary students in Romainville communal primary schools, making a total of 2,782 students.

Primary schools:

- Preschools: Marcel Cachin, Danielle Casanova, Charlie Chaplin, Jean Charcot, Youri Gagarine, Véronique et Florestan
- Elementary schools: Henri Barbusse, Marcel Cachin, Jean Charcot, Fraternité, Paul Langevin, Gabriel-Péri, Paul Vaillant-Couturier, Maryse-Bastié.

Junior high schools:

- Collège Gustave Courbet
- Collège Pierre-André Houël

Lycée Liberté, a vocational high school, is in Romainville.

== International relations ==
Romainville is twinned with:

- Casalecchio di Reno, Italy
- Jericho, Palestine
- Benfleet, England
Romainville at the beginning of the 20th century

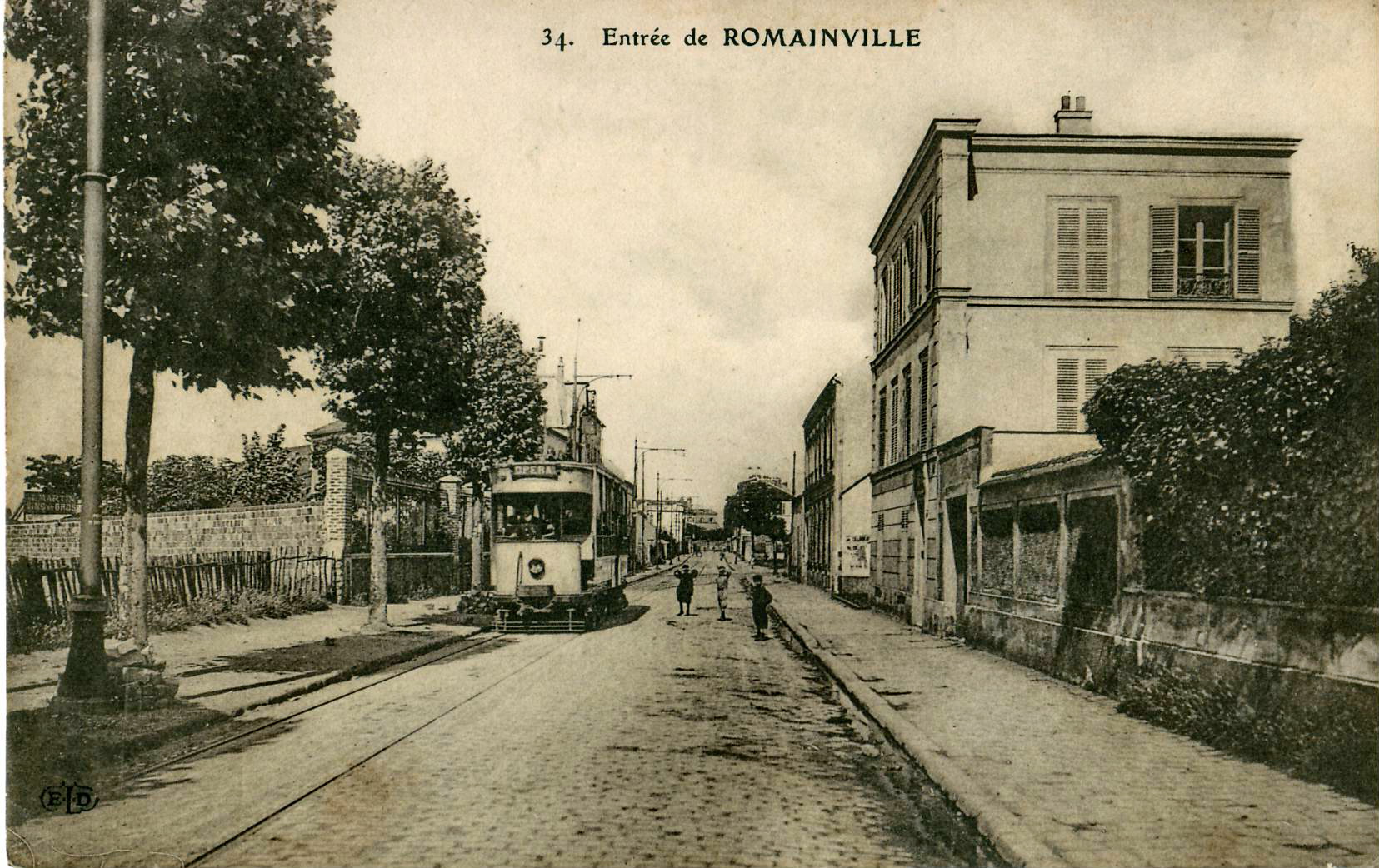
Entrance of the city of Romainville and the tramway in the direction of the Opera.

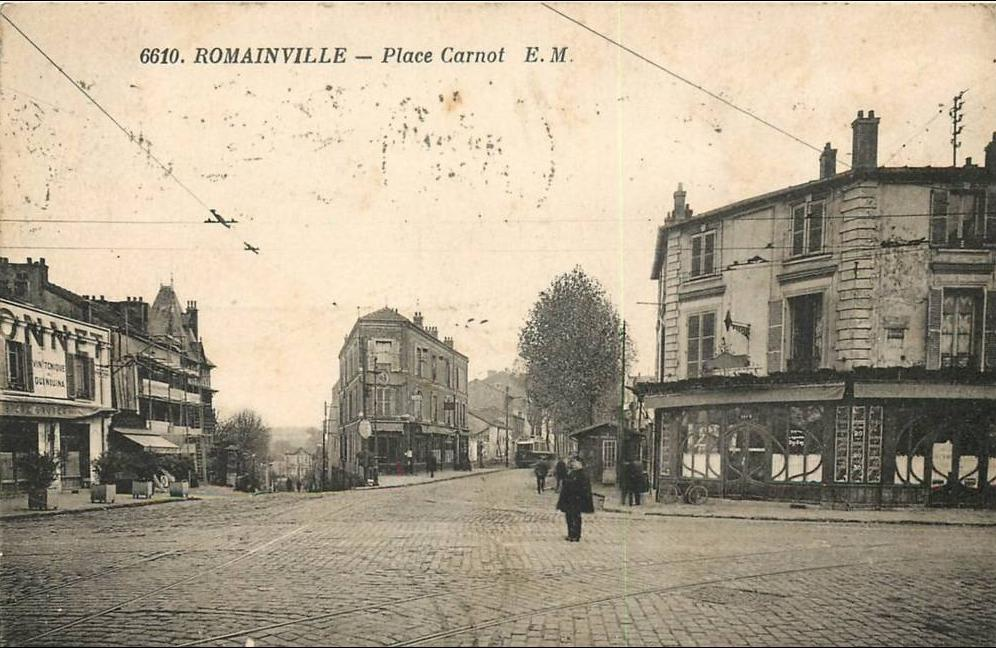
La Place Carnot.

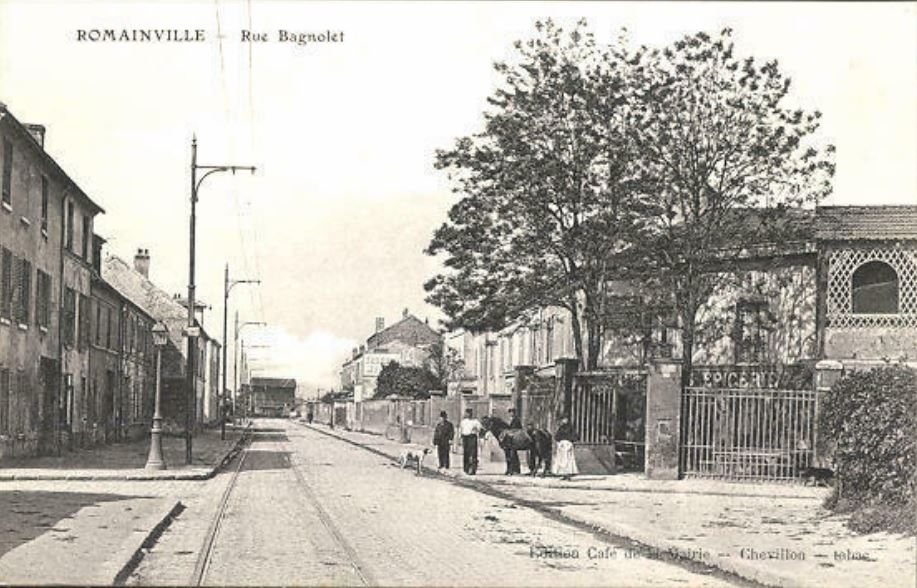
La rue de Bagnolet, today the rue de la République.

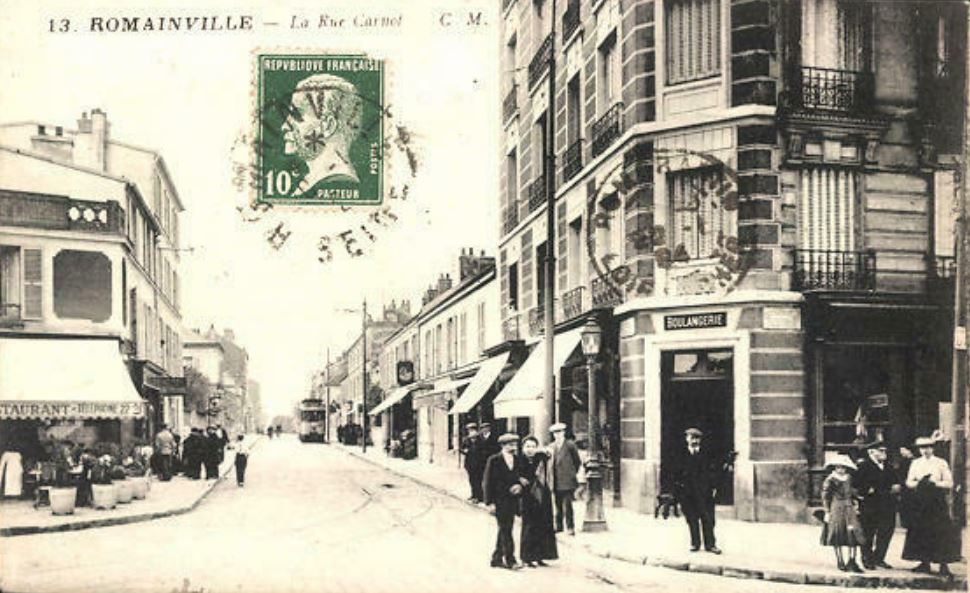
Rue Carnot.

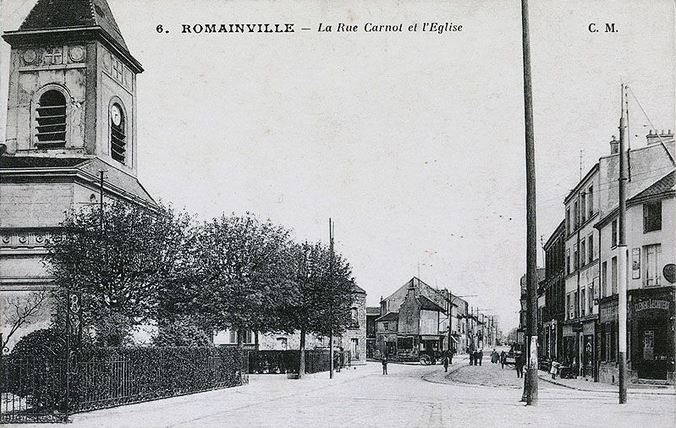
La rue Carnot and the church.

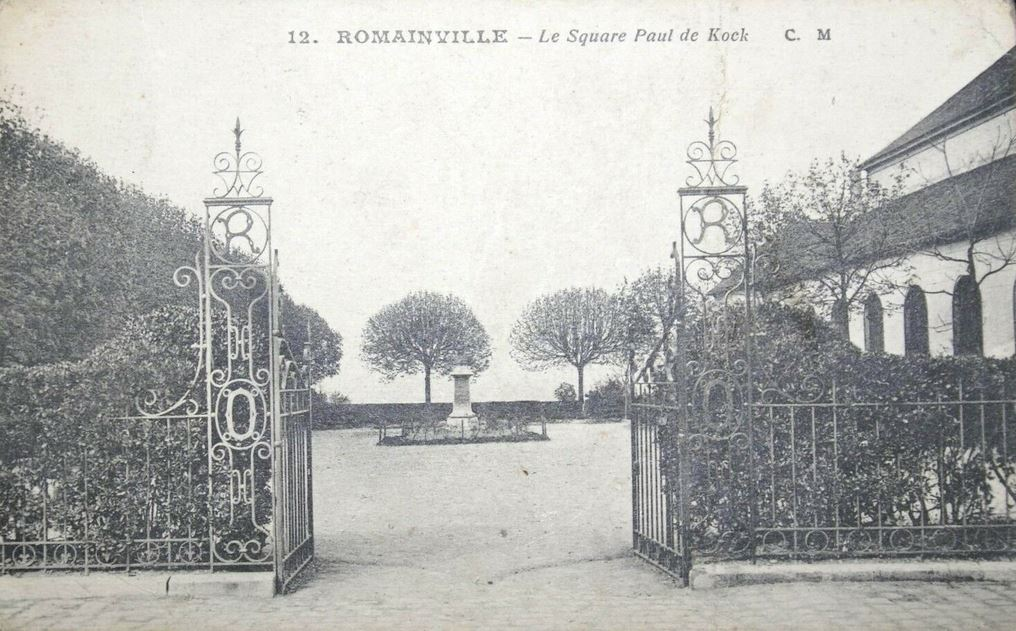
The Square Paul-de-Kock.

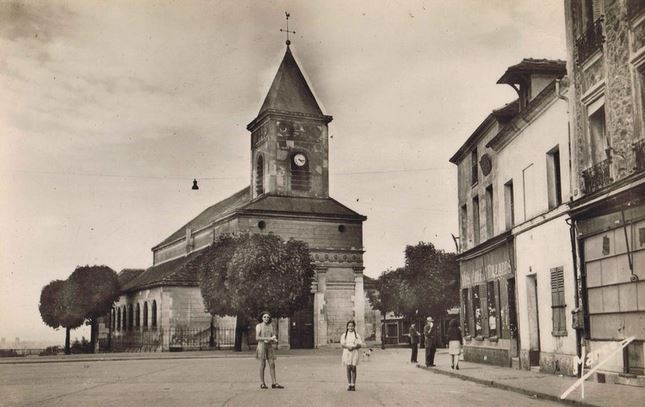
The church of Saint-Germain-l'Auxerrois, designed by Alexandre-Théodore Brongniart.

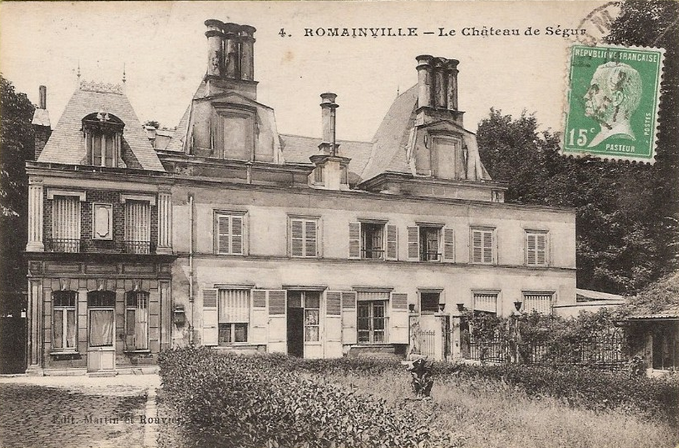
The Château de Ségur, also known as the Château de Romainville. Bought by Henri François, Comte de Ségur, in 1723.

== Heraldry ==
arms of Romainville	The arms of Romainville are blazoned : Per fess azure and Or, a castle argent, open pierced and masoned sable, and an oak eradicated vert.

== See also ==
- Communes of the Seine-Saint-Denis department
- Convoi des 31000
