= Musée du Berry =

Museum in Bourges, France

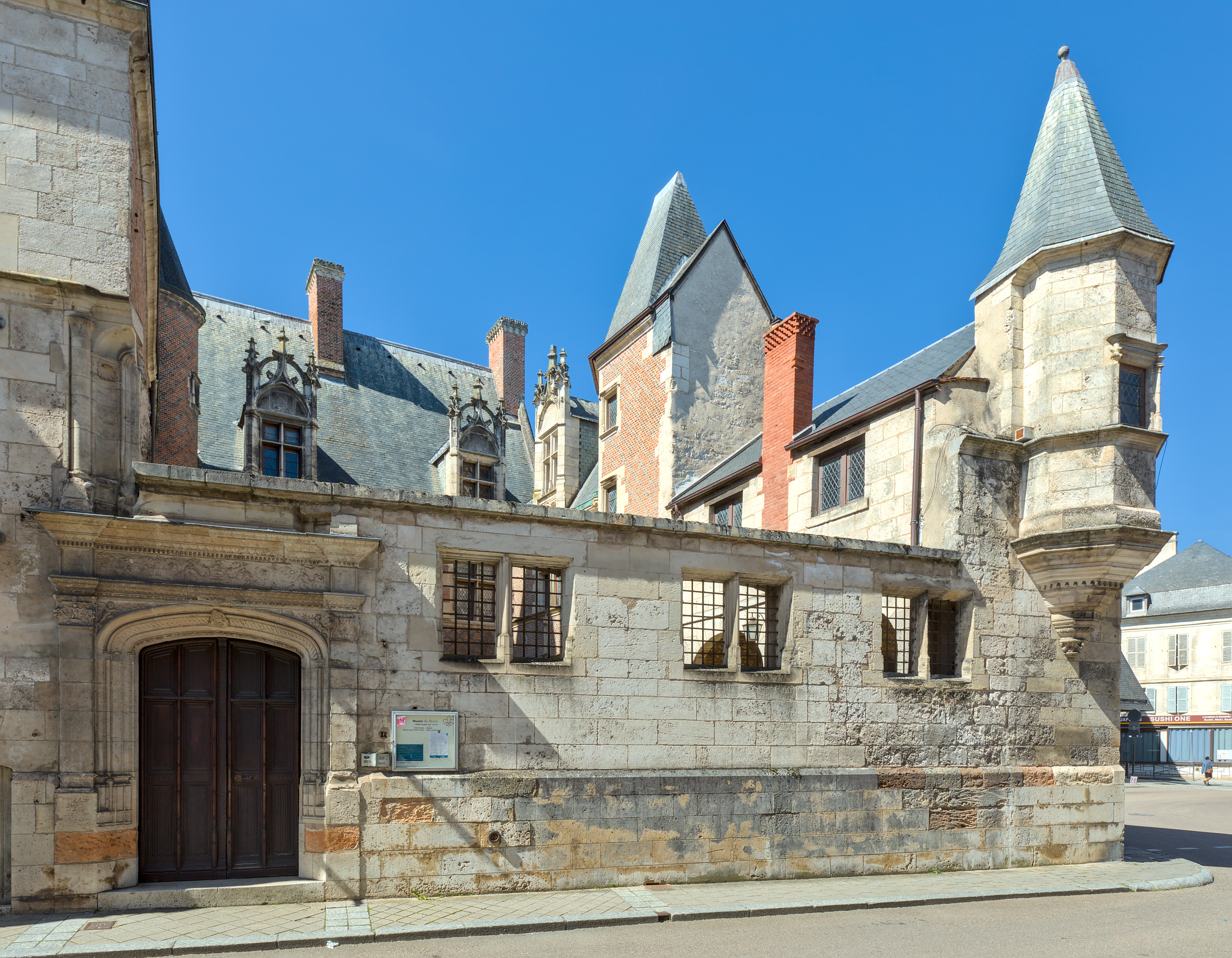
The Musée du Berry at the Hôtel Cujas

The Musée du Berry is a museum in Bourges, France. Its collection was founded by Claude-Denis Mater in 1834. At first, the museum was housed in part of the Palais Jacques-Cœur, and later in what is now the Hôtel d'Angleterre on rue Jacques Cœur. In 1891, it moved to its present home in the Hôtel Cujas. It was renamed the Musée du Berry in 1912.

== History ==
The original collection of the museum was founded by Claude-Denis Mater. The foundation of the museum was established by the prefect of Cher, the Count of Lapparent, by the decree issued on June 30, 1834. Installed first in a room of the Palais Jacques-Coeur until 1837, then in a house belonging to M. Pelletier, the current Hôtel d'Angleterre, rue Jacques Cœur, with a 6-year lease, but in 1844, the owner of the premises no longer wishing to continue this lease, the museum had to move in 1848, but the premises having been bought out, the new owner extended the lease. In 1856, the city sold the Jacques-Coeur Palace to the State to install various judicial services there. In 1862, on the death of Claude-Denis Mater, the museum almost disappeared before the prefect decided to reorganize its management by appointing an administrative commission, a new director, Jules Dumoutet, and giving the departmental museum the name of Musée Mater . In 1863, in a deliberation decided that the museum should not be called departmental museum but Museum of Bourges. The prefect appoints Alphonse Joseph Charmeil curator of the museum and Antoine Cougny, assistant curator. Finally, the general council decided to abandon the museum to the city of Bourges in 1864.

The mayor of Bourges, Pierre Planchat, has appointed a museum commission under the chairmanship of Alphonse Mater. Jules Dumoutet leaves his post. Since the origin of the museum, its installation in a building large enough to ensure the presentation of all its collections and allow it to receive their growth. Finally, the museum is housed from 1891 in the Cujas hotel. It was in 1912 that it took the title of “Musée du Berry”.

Originally made up of coins and works of art, the collection of the Musée du Berry has gradually been enriched in these disciplines, as well as in the fields of archaeology, natural history and medieval history. It was not until 1950 that a real regional ethnographic fund was created. Currently, the ground floor is devoted to archaeological collections, from prehistory to the end of Gallo-Roman times. One of these rooms exhibits 220 Gallo-Roman steles and decorations from ancient Bourges. Another room brings together a collection of Egyptian funerary objects, including the mummy of Djehdor, dating from the 4th century BC. J.-C. There are also Etruscan bronzes from the protohistoric period, mosaics, wall paintings, glass crockery, terracotta and bronzes from the Gallo-Roman period. Another wing is devoted to the arts of Berry: a room exhibits the mourners from the tomb of Duke Jean de Berry among other medieval works. There are also paintings by the painter Jean Boucher (1568 - 1632), known as Boucher de Bourges. On the first floor, there are works by Italian, Dutch and French painters with works dating from the 16th to the 19th century.

== Bibliography ==
- Antonin Cougny, Les Beaux-arts : revue nouvelle, 1^{er} semestre 1861, p. 340-343, 372-374
- Daniel Mater, Mémoires de la Société historique, littéraire et scientifique du Cher, 4^{e} série, vol. 20, 1905, p. 189-320
- Daniel Mater, Mémoires de la Société historique, littéraire et scientifique du Cher, 4^{e} série, vol. 22, 1908, p. 137-237
