= Jacques de Pierpont =

Belgian rock journalist

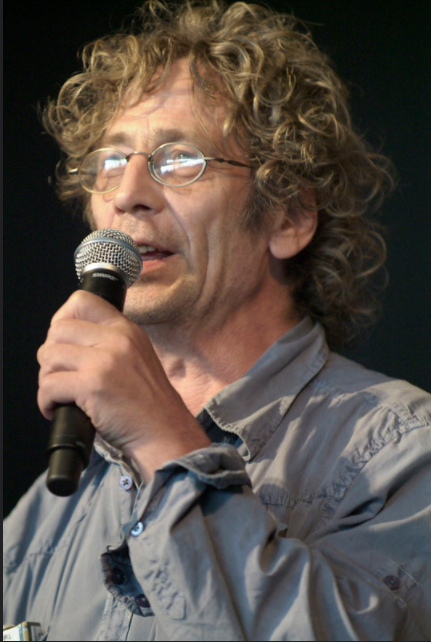
Jacques de Pierpont

Jacques de Pierpont is a rock journalist from Belgium.

He works for RTBF at the radio station Classic 21 where he presented Hell's bells. He retired in March 2015.
