= Les Lilas =

- Commune
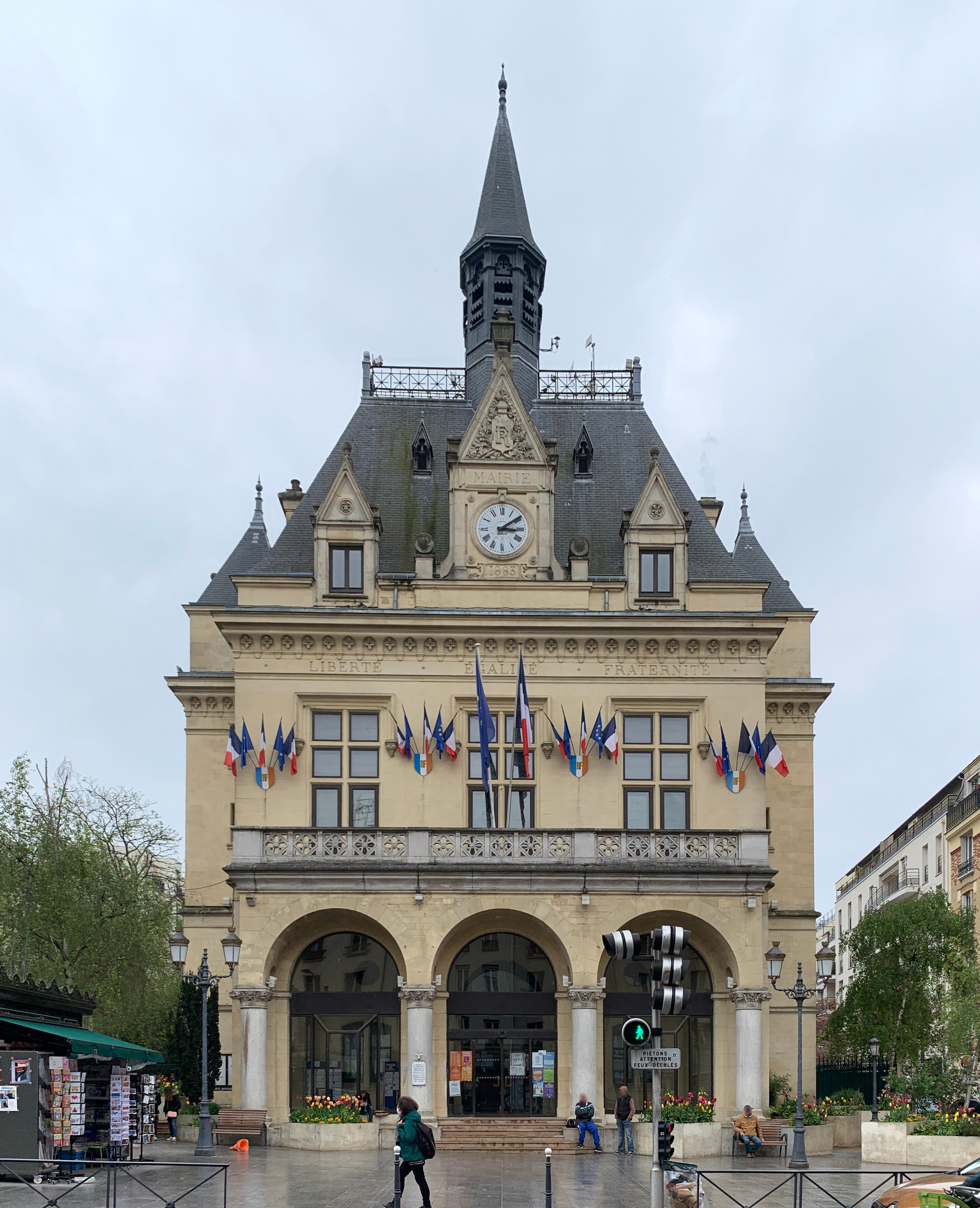
- The Hôtel de Ville

- Coat of arms

- Location (in red) within Paris inner suburbs
- Location of Les Lilas
- Location within France Location within Île-de-France (region)
- Coordinates: 48°53′N 2°25′E
- Country: France
- Region: Île-de-France
- Department: Seine-Saint-Denis
- Arrondissement: Bobigny
- Canton: Bagnolet
- Intercommunality: Grand Paris

Government
  - Mayor (2026–32): Lionel Benharous
- Area^{1}: 1.26 km^{2} (0.49 sq mi)
- Elevation: 126 m (413 ft)
- Population (2023): 23,843
  - Density: 18,900/km^{2} (49,000/sq mi)
- Demonym: Lilasiens
- Time zone: UTC+01:00 (CET)
  - Summer (DST): UTC+02:00 (CEST)
- INSEE/Postal code: 93045 /93260
- Website: www.ville-leslilas.fr
- ^{1} French Land Register data, which excludes lakes, ponds, glaciers > 1 km^{2} (0.386 sq mi or 247 acres) and river estuaries.

Les Lilas (French pronunciation: [le lila]) is a commune in the northeastern inner suburbs of Paris, France. It is in Seine-Saint-Denis, 5.7 km (3.5 mi) from the centre of Paris.

== History ==
The commune of Les Lilas (lit. 'the lilacs') was created under the Second Empire on 24 July 1867 amid Haussmann's renovation of Paris by detaching a part of the territory of Romainville and merging it with a part of the territory of Pantin and a part of the territory of Bagnolet. Les Lilas owes its name to the flower gardens that covered the hill on which the commune was established. The Hôtel de Ville was completed in 1884.

=== Heraldry ===
| Arms of Les Lilas | The arms of Les Lilas are blazoned: Or fretty vert, semy (in the spaces) of lilacs proper. Motto: J'étais fleur, je suis cité (Once a flower, now a city) |

== Population ==
Historical population

| Year | Pop. | ±% p.a. |
|---|---|---|
| 1872 | 3,699 | — |
| 1876 | 4,411 | +4.50% |
| 1881 | 5,690 | +5.22% |
| 1886 | 5,887 | +0.68% |
| 1891 | 6,417 | +1.74% |
| 1896 | 7,438 | +3.00% |
| 1901 | 8,925 | +3.71% |
| 1906 | 10,470 | +3.24% |
| 1911 | 11,654 | +2.17% |
| 1921 | 14,599 | +2.28% |
| 1926 | 18,109 | +4.40% |
| 1931 | 19,500 | +1.49% |
| 1936 | 19,467 | −0.03% |

| Year | Pop. | ±% p.a. |
|---|---|---|
| 1946 | 17,685 | −0.96% |
| 1954 | 18,590 | +0.63% |
| 1962 | 17,721 | −0.60% |
| 1968 | 15,817 | −1.88% |
| 1975 | 20,054 | +3.45% |
| 1982 | 20,354 | +0.21% |
| 1990 | 20,118 | −0.15% |
| 1999 | 20,226 | +0.06% |
| 2007 | 22,324 | +1.24% |
| 2012 | 22,920 | +0.53% |
| 2017 | 23,045 | +0.11% |
| 2023 | 23,843 | +0.57% |

Source: EHESS and INSEE (1968–2023)

== Transport ==
Les Lilas is served by Mairie des Lilas and Serge Gainsbourg stations on Line 11 of the Paris Métro.

== Notable residents ==
- It is the home of the exiled royal family of Montenegro.
- It is the birthplace of French actress Maïwenn Le Besco, French actor Marc Ruchmann and violinist Guillaume Latour, French comic book author Aude Massot.

== In popular culture ==
Les Lilas is known for the 1958 hit song by Serge Gainsbourg, "Le Poinçonneur des Lilas", about a ticket puncher at the Porte des Lilas Métro station. This Métro station is actually in Paris, one stop away from the Mairie des Lilas Métro station which is in Les Lilas.

== Education ==
Primary schools:

- Three public preschool-elementary schools (Calmette, des Bruyères, and Julie-Daubié)
- Three public preschools (Courcoux, Victor-Hugo and Romain-Rolland)
- Four public elementary only schools (Paul-Langevin, Romain-Rolland, École Waldeck-Rousseau, École Victor-Hugo)
- One private elementary school (École Notre-Dame)

Public secondary schools:

- Collège Marie Curie
- Lycée polyvalent Paul-Robert

There is also a public library, Bibliothèque André-Malraux.

== See also ==
- Communes of the Seine-Saint-Denis department
