= Frank Giroud =

French comics writer (1956–2018)

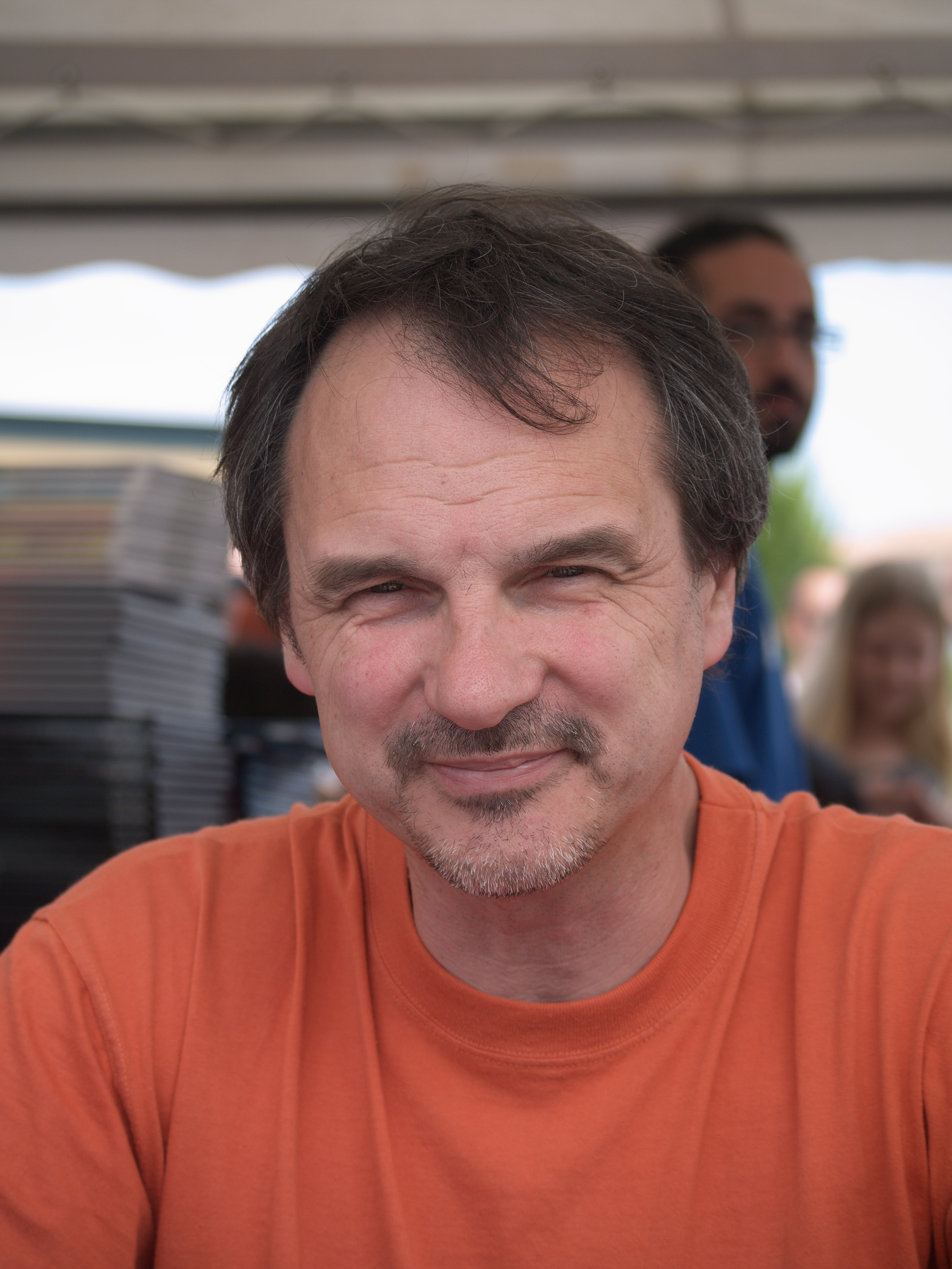
- Frank Giroud in 2010
- Born: 3 May 1956; Toulouse, France
- Died: 13 July 2018 (aged 62)
- Education: École Nationale des Chartes
- Occupation: Comics writer
- Spouse: Virginie Greiner

Frank Giroud (3 May 1956 – 13 July 2018) was a French comics writer.

== Early life ==
Giroud was born on May 3, 1956, in Toulouse, France. He graduated from the École Nationale des Chartes, and he passed the agrégation in History.

== Career ==
Giroud taught history in Milan and Grenoble.

Giroud was a comics writer. He wrote the text for Louis la Guigne, drawn by Jean-Paul Dethorey. He also wrote the text for Mandrill, drawn by Barly Baruti, as well as Oubliés d’Annam and Azrayen, drawn by Christian Lax. In 2000, he created Le Décalogue, published by Glénat Editions.

Giroud was awarded the Max & Moritz Prize for Best International Writer in 2002.

== Death ==
Giroud died on July 13, 2018, at 62.
