= Collective of female comics creators against sexism =

Feminist comics organization

The Collective of female comics creators against sexism (Collectif des créatrices de bande dessinée contre le sexisme), also known as BD Egalité, is a movement of female comics authors created to fight gender inequalities in comics publishing. Its creation was announced in September 2015. It gathered at the time 147 members (scenario writers, comic artists, illustrators, colourists) and has since grown bigger.

== Context ==
In 2017, female comic writers and artists represented only 12,8% of European authors of francophone comic books and 48% of colourists are women, according to a report of the French Association of Critics and Journalists of Comics (Association des Critiques et des journalistes de Bande Dessinée).

== Creation of the collective ==
In September 2013, Lisa Mandel prepared a parody exhibition : Men and comics (Les Hommes et la BD). She gathered the testimonies of thirty female authors on their situation as women in the comics world. In the spring of 2015, ahead of an exhibition entitled Girls' comics (La BD des filles) planned at the Belgian Comic Strip Center, Jul Maroh was asked to participate. The cartoonist believed that this project was misogynistic: there is no artistic genre called "female comics" (nor "male comics"). This categorization marginalizes female creators, even if some argue that it is a marketing niche. Maroh then contacted 70 female colleagues, half of whom had participated in the 2013 discussion with Mandel. A few days later, 100 professionals joined the debate. They drafted the "Charter of Women Comics Creators Against Sexism," speaking out against the gendered approach to their work and careers, calling on "creators, publishers, institutions, booksellers, librarians and journalists" to detach themselves from gendered stereotypes and denouncing "gendered marketing." The creation of the collective was announced on September 9, 2015 and opened its website: 147 female creators were members. By January 2018, the group had more than 250 members. The signatories refuse to be part of collections, exhibitions or "women" awards. Testimonials illustrate experiences of discrimination in their profession.

== Scandal of the Angoulême festival grand prize of 2016 ==
In 2016, the organizers of the Angoulême International Comics Festival proposed a pre-selection of thirty names for the grand prize of the city of Angoulême, which rewards the entire career of an author. Their list did not include any woman. After this was brought to light by the collective, and some of its members called for a boycott of the vote to denounce this lack of gender diversity, several short-listed artists asked for their withdrawal from the entirely male list. The company 9emeArt+, organizing the festival, first denied sexism, stating that "Unfortunately, there are few women in the history of comics art. It's a reality. If you go to the Louvre, you'll equally find very few women artists." The illustrator Alraun launched on Twitter the hashtag #WomenDoBD to make women with a career in comics more prominent. The festival then included six female nominees, before permanently changing the selection method, leaving authors to elect their peers: each Member of the Academy gets a free vote.

Jessica Abel introduced the debate to English speakers on social media. A few months later, Kelly Sue DeConnick, inspired by these events, launched the #VisibleWomen hashtag to campaign against the marginalization of women in comics creation.

== BD Egalité website and testimonies ==
From its beginning, the website of the collective, has included a section where female comic artists report misogynistic behavior encountered in their professional sphere. In 2017, the media reacted to the "Pay Your Bubble!" initiative based on these testimonials. This movement echoes other French-speaking feminist initiatives on misogyny in the workplace and at university ("pay your blouse", "pay your dress", "pay your college"...). Some of the testimonies are signed, others are anonymous and report verbal aggression, contempt or inappropriate gestures. This initiative of the Collective receives the support of the National Union of Authors and Composers of Comics.
