= List of Kyo Kara Maoh! episodes =

The Kyo Kara Maoh! anime series is based on the light novel series of the same name written by Tomo Takabayashi. It was directed by Junji Nishimura, animated by Studio Deen, and was produced by NHK. The first two seasons ran from April 3, 2004, to February 25, 2006. In 2007, they made a five-part OVA titled Kyo Kara Maoh! R, with each episode released separately directly to DVD. In 2008, the series was renewed for a third season which ran from April 3, 2008, to February 19, 2009.

The first two seasons were broadcast in America on ImaginAsian. The third season and OVA have been licensed for English release by Discotek.

== Episode list ==
=== Season 1 ===
Opening theme song: "Hateshinaku Tooi Sora Ni" (果てしなく遠い空に) by The Stand Up

Ending theme song: "Suteki na Shiawase" (ステキな幸せ) by The Stand Up

No.	Title	Original airdate
1	"Flushed Into an Alternate World!"; Transliteration: "Nagasarete Isekai" (Japanese: 流されて異世界)	April 3, 2004
Yuri Shibuya was just a normal Japanese high school kid who likes baseball and had a strong sense of justice until one day on his way home from school he sees a former classmate of his, Murata, being bullied. He steps in to try and stop the bullies but they just grab him instead and dunk his head in a toilet in the girls' bathroom. But for some reason, when his head enters the water, Yuri is sucked into the toilet and ends up in another world. When he wakes in an unfamiliar area, he initially assumes that he is at a theme park because of the medieval-style clothes the people are wearing. He tries to talk to the villagers but they attack him. Adalbert von Grantz rides up on a horse and saves him from the villagers and uses some form of magic to unlock the local language hidden in Yuri's soul. Conrad Weller then rides up and after a short fight Adalbert runs away. Conrad takes Yuri to a small village where he meets Günter von Christ who tells him that he is the new king of the Demon Kingdom. They then take Yuri to the castle where he meets Wolfram von Bielefelt and Gwendal von Voltaire, Conrad's two half-brothers (who do not look anything alike!).
2	"Duel! Pretty Boy vs. Baseball Boy"; Transliteration: "Kettou! Bishōnen VS Yakyuu Shōnen" (Japanese: 決闘! 美少年VS野球少年)	April 10, 2004
While attending a dinner party that the former Queen is holding, Wolfram insults Yuri's mother by saying she is dirty human and Yuri reacts to the insult by slapping Wolfram across the left cheek. From everyone's weird reaction to the slap he finds out that this is actually how the nobles of the Demon Kingdom propose. Wolfram then throws his silverware on the floor to challenge Yuri to a duel to contest the engagement and Yuri unknowingly accepts by picking up a knife. Yuri is allowed to choose how they fight the duel and so he decides they should fight through a sumo match. Yuri wins the match but Wolfram finds this type of fight unfair so he challenges Yuri to a sword fight. Yuri manages to win the sword fight also but Wolfram becomes angry and attacks him with magic. Even though no one thinks Yuri has any magic yet Yuri seems to transform and summons two water dragons to hold Wolfram back. Seeing the power that Yuri has, Wolfram finally accepts defeat and accepts Yuri as the rightful king.
3	"Yuri Shibuya! I AM the Demon King!"; Transliteration: "Shibuya Yuuri! Ore ga MAou Da" (Japanese: 渋谷有利! 俺が㋮王だ)	April 17, 2004
When Yuri wakes up after his first time using magic he finds out from Wolfram that Conrad and Gwendal have gone off to protect a human refugee village that is being attacked. Yuri convinces Wolfram to take him out to help. On the way they run into Adalbert who tells Yuri that it is humans that are attacking the town so it is a fight between humans. He tries to convince Yuri to come with him and leave the demons but Yuri decides he is going to help the demons. Yuri decides to become the demon king and when they return to the capital they hold a coronation ceremony. To complete the ceremony he has to stick his hand in a waterfall but when he does he gets sucked back to Earth.
4	"What's Next? The Ultimate Weapon!?"; Transliteration: "Kondo wa Saishuu Heiki!?" (Japanese: 今度は最終兵器!?)	April 24, 2004
Yuri awakens to finds himself in the girls' bathroom he originally disappeared from with Ken Murata in front of him with a police officer. Yuri decides to continue his interests in baseball by starting his own baseball team. While Yuri is at a baseball game, his mother, Miko, reminiscences about the past. After the game, Yuri is sucked back to the other world, where he finds out that some humans are threatening to start a war with them. Günter and Gwendal think it's a good idea for Yuri to hunt down the demon sword, Morgif, to make them so strong the humans will give up on wars.
5	"Sailors and a Spoiled Brat"; Transliteration: "Se-ra-fuku to Kikan Bou" (Japanese: セーラー服ときかん坊)	May 1, 2004
Yuri, Conrad, and Wolfram set sail on a ship to Van da Via island where the demon sword, Morgif, is rumored to be located. On the ship there Yuri meets a ships apprentice named Rick, a merchant named Heathcrife and his daughter Beatrice. That night a group of pirates board the ship they're on. Conrad hid Wolfram and Yuri in a closet from the pirates but Yuri makes a cat noise and gets them caught. Yuri tries reason them that their actions are wrong, but when he sees one of the pirates dragging Beatrice he is angered and brings out his magic. He successfully repels the pirates with a monster made of the bones the humans have thrown on the ground. Conrad, Wolfram, and Yuri are put in a cell but Jozak frees them and they escape in a boat.
6	"The Terror of Morgif, a Man-Eating Demon Sword"; Transliteration: "Hito Kui MAken, Morugifu no Kyoufu?" (Japanese: 人喰い㋮剣・モルギフの恐怖?)	May 8, 2004
Conrad, Wolfram, Yuri, and Jozak reach the Van da Via island. At the inn they are staying at they learn about a legend of a cursed hot spring in the mountain and they decide Morgif is probably there so they decide to go investigate it. They find the sword at the bottom of the hot spring and Yuri attempts to grab it but it has a face and it bites him and so he runs away scared. They give up and return to the inn but later in the night he overhears a conversation between Jozak and Conrad and so Yuri goes back by himself to prove that he is worthy of being king and this time he successfully obtains the sword.
7	"Runaway? Stray? Demon Sword in Motion!"; Transliteration: "Bousou? Nuisou? MAken Hatsudou!" (Japanese: 暴走?迷走？㋮剣発動!)	May 15, 2004
With Morgif now in his possession, Yuri finds out that the sword needs to absorb souls for energy. Jozak tricks Yuri to participating in a gladiator event so he can absorb souls when people die. Yuri is forced into a colosseum fight to the death and when he reaches the field he finds out that his opponent is Rick, the apprentice from the ship they were on. Yuri wins the battle and attempts to spare Rick's life but since Yuri won't kill him Rick is shot with an arrow by one of the guards. An old man in the audience has a heart attack and dies which activates the stone on Morgif's head causing him to suck in the man's soul. Yuri manages to bring Morgif under control and escapes with Jozak, Conrad, Wolfram, and Rick. They take the sword back to The Demon Kingdom and when they get back Celi looks at the sword and tries to hold it but she drops it and the stone on the swords forehead falls out. Without the stone Morgif will not absorb souls. Yuri entrusts Jozak to discard stone as he wishes. Yuri returns to earth.
8	"Moonlit Plot"; Transliteration: "Gekka no Inbou" (Japanese: 月下の陰謀)	May 22, 2004
While Yuuri is on Earth, Stoffel is in the other world hatching a plan. Yuri returns to the other world once again after a baseball game, arriving in the Original King temple's fountain. There he is met by his advisers, and the temple Maiden, Ulrike. Ulrike warns Conrad of an impending danger. At night, Conrad and his soldiers go to investigate some incidents of villagers being attacked. During the investigation, shadowy figures infiltrate the castle.
9	"Stolen Treasure"; Transliteration: "Nusumareta Hihou" (Japanese: 盗まれた秘宝)	May 29, 2004
In the morning, nothing appears to have happened. However one of the soldiers found the door to the treasure room was picked. They find that the gem of the dragon king, that was part of a crown, was stolen. Yuri attempts to find the gem which leads to some comical events. During the search, the shadowy figures reveal themselves and try to kidnap Yuri. Conrad and Wolfram interfere and manage to capture one of the criminals and they find out from the interrogation that Stoffel was behind the stealing of the gem. Later at night Conrad, Wolfram, and Yuri set off to find concrete evidence against Stoffel.
10	"The Hand of Evil Looms Closer!"; Transliteration: "Semari Kuru MA no Te!" (Japanese: 迫り来る㋮の手!)	June 5, 2004
As Yuri, Wolfram, and Conrad leave the castle to some soldiers, Stoffel and Raven start their next move. During the investigation, Conrad orders Wolfram and Yuri to stay put in a building. Yuri drags Wolfram and the remaining soldiers to conduct his own investigation of the missing dragon gem. Yuri's action led to his own abduction by Stoffel's men. Now Conrad and Wolfram head to Stoffel's castle to rescue Yuri.
11	"The War Begins in the Alternate World"; Transliteration: "Jigen no Mukou de Sensou ga Hajimaru" (Japanese: 次元のむこうで戦争がはじまる)	June 12, 2004
Yuri wakes to find himself in Stoffel's castle. Stoffel tries to persuade Yuri to join his side, but Yuri rejects. As Gwendal and Stoffel prepare their soldiers for war, Jozak, dressed as a maid, manages to sneak Yuri out of his room by dressing him as a maid as well. Yuri gives their position away when he hears that a civil war is about to start. After Yuri reunites with Conrad and Wolfram, Yuri proceeds to stop Gwendal and Stoffel's forces from engaging. Yuri uses his power to stop the two armies from clashing. After the short battle, Yuri returns home to Earth. P.S. It is later discovered in an IOU letter that Celi was the one who took the gem of the dragon king, wearing it as part of a necklace in order to woo men.
12	"Chains of Love and Destiny"; Transliteration: "Ai to Shukumei no Kusari" (Japanese: 愛と宿命の鎖)	June 26, 2004
Yuri goes to see a dolphin show, but when he is called up to the stage to shake hands with a dolphin he is then transported to the other world. After Yuri finds out about an imposter thought to be the Demon King, Yuri plans a trip to save the person, accompanied by Wolfram and Conrad. Along the way they met up with Gwendal. During the trip, they encounter a Sand Bear and Wolfram along with the rest of the soldiers except for Conrad and Gwendal fall into its sand trap. Yuri orders Conrad to rescue Wolfram. Gwendal and Yuri continue on to the country of Svelera. When Gwendal and Yuri stop at a town to gather water and provisions, they are mistaken to be an eloping couple and are chained together. They manage to escape.
13	"The Bride, Yuri and Gwendal"; Transliteration: "Hanayome to Yuuri to Guendaru" (Japanese: 花嫁と有利とグウェンダル)	July 3, 2004
Gwendal and Yuri enter the capital city of Svelera. When they enter a church they met Nicola, a bride, who then runs away from her own wedding ceremony with Yuri and Gwendal (both still chained together). A young boy gives refuge to Yuri, Nicola, and Gwendal from their pursuers. As they hide from their pursuers, Nicola reveals that she has the demon flute. Yuri tries to use it, but does not work. Their pursuers found their hiding place and so the boy and Nicola escape through the secret tunnel, while Yuri and Gwendal allow themselves to be captured as an eloping couple.
14	"Yuri Does Heavy Labor"; Transliteration: "Yuuri, Jyouroudousu" (Japanese: 有利、重労働す)	July 10, 2004
Gwendal and Yuri are sent to trial for Yuri eloping with a demon. Yuri is sentenced to work in the esoteric stone mines, while Gwendal is confined in a cell lined with esoteric stones. Conrad and Wolfram find the boy and Nicola who inform them of Yuri and Gwendal's possible locations. While Yuri was working at the mine, he sees some soldiers attempting to bury a beaten and bruised, but still alive baby. Angered by their actions, he then goes berserk and unleashes a mud monster on the soldiers. Gwendal manages to stop Yuri from causing any more damage.
15	"Rainfall in the Desert"; Transliteration: "Sabaku ni Furu Ame" (Japanese: 砂漠に降る雨)	July 17, 2004
After Yuri wakes up, he finds Norica digging through the cemetery looking for her son. Instead of a body they find the second part of the demon flute. As Yuri, the remaining women, and the brothers traverse the desert to escape the forces, they are trapped by the Sand Bear and prison guards. Yuri plays the Demon Flute which summons a storm that stops the prison guard army. Ryan then assists their escape with his partner, the sand bear. Back at the castle, Yuri tries to return home, but finds out he cannot go home.
16	"The Demon King Case File!"; Transliteration: "MAou torimono hikae" (Japanese: ㋮王捕物控!)	July 24, 2004
After Yuri studies and practices baseball with Conrad, the news of a demon stone being stolen perks Yuri's interest. Yuri sets off into the city to find the stone with Jozak, Conrad, and Wolfram. They find the missing Demon Stone in the hands of Rosetta and her family, but the family is using the stone's power to repair magic tools and restore magic to earn more money for food. Yuri then decides to help them to get enough food. While they were helping Rosetta, they found that some thieves are trying to reclaim the demon stone. That night they find out that the thieves kidnapped Rosetta's brother and Rosetta set off with the demon stone to exchange for her sibling. Yuri, Conrad, Wolfram, Jozak, and Günter arrive in time to get the demon stone and save Rosetta's brother. Conrad decides to let Rosetta use the Demon Stone for business.
17	"I am Remarrying"; Transliteration: "Watashi, Saikon Shimasu" (Japanese: 私、再婚します)	August 28, 2004
Stoffel and Raven attempt to appease Yuri by arraigning a celebration for him. Celi bursts into the room and declares she is marrying Raven, which shocks Raven and Stoffel. The past of Stoffel, Raven, and Celi are also revealed. During the ceremony, Ryan along with the sand bear, Keiji, arrive. Keiji's entrance however causes a sink hole which Stoffel, Raven, Celi, Yuri, Gwendal, and Conrad fall into. Raven and Celi reminisce their childhood memories at a crystal cave. Stoffel, Yuri, Gwendal, and Conrad find Celi and Raven. Then Keiji, Ryan, Günter, and Wolfram also manage to find them as well. Celi leaves again.
18	"In the Name of Love"; Transliteration: "Sono Ai no Tame ni" (Japanese: その愛のために)	September 4, 2004
Yuri and Wolfram enter the guesthouse to get rid of some monsters. They both fall to the basement of the building due to weak floors. There they meet some caterpillar creatures that soon transform into their cocoon stage. Wolfram and Yuri have an argument about killing the monsters or letting them live. Meanwhile Gwendal and Günter search for Wolfram and Yuri. The building was collapsing, but then the cocoons hatch into bear bees and they keep the building from collapsing.
19	"Hero vs. Demon King (part 1)"; Transliteration: "Yuusha VS Maou Zenpen" (Japanese: 勇者VS魔王 前編)	September 11, 2004
A fantasy world calls for a fantasy adventure, and Yuri has decided that he wants to see a dragon. He, Wolfram, Conrad, and Günter set out to the dragon preserve (dragons are an endangered species after all) to find one. Yuri quickly makes friends with one, just in time for some trespassing humans to attack looking to kill and sell a dragon. Unfortunately for Yuri, the group includes a young hero named Alford with a holy sword who decides to use the confusion to try and kill the "evil demon king".
20	"Hero vs. Demon King (part 2)"; Transliteration: "Yuusha VS Maou Kouhen" (Japanese: 勇者VS魔王 後編)	September 18, 2004
Alford learns what it truly means to be a Hero. Yuri and the others find the dragons a new nest to help shield them from possible future poachers.
21	"The Dangerous Visitor"; Transliteration: "Kiken na Boumonsha" (Japanese: 危険な訪問者)	September 25, 2004
A young girl shows up claiming to be Yuri's illegitimate child, and then tries to kill Yuri. Yuri, compassionate as always, decides to give the girl the benefit of the doubt and assures everyone that there must have been a good reason behind it. To recover from a twisted ankle he received during the assassination attempt, Yuri along with Conrad, Wolfram, and the little girl head to Hildyard to visit some healing hot springs. The city looks fun, but who is the mysterious, masked bodyguard and why does the little girl seem to know him?
22	"The Man of Fate"; Transliteration: "Unmei no otoko" (Japanese: 運命の男)	October 2, 2004
Greta spotted a man in town that she wanted to see again. Despite the fact that Conrad had told them to stay put, and still suffering from a twisted ankle, Yuri takes Greta into town. Yuri gets a sense of Déjà vu when he stops to defend a girl from some bullies and she promptly runs away. Yuri grabs Greta and runs and the same girl that ran saves them. However they are eventually caught. They get away from the cell, but while being chased they are saved by Conrad and Wolfram. Then a man Yuri met on the boat to Van da Via, Heathcrife, shows up wanting to get back all the property in this town that a man named Vuillon swindled and forced from their owners. After a masked man attacks Yuri, Conrad steps in to protects Yuri and fights him. But who is this masked man? And can Conrad defeat him?
23	"The Race of Flames"; Transliteration: "Honou no Re-su" (Japanese: 炎のレース)	October 9, 2004
The masked man turns out to be Hube, who now lays dying with Greta clinging to him. She tells the others that in her old home, Hube, who was in the dungeon, was the only one who would talk or listen to her. Yuri wants to heal him but Conrad tells him not to. Wolfram does only because it's what Yuri wants. The next day Yuri and the others go to a rare animal race. It turns out that after the fight between Conrad and Hube that Yuri demanded that Vuillon return everything he swindled from the people. Vuillon said he would if Yuri could beat him in a gambling contest. The stakes, if Yuri wins he'll return everything, if he loses Yuri becomes his! Conrad assures him that he'd pick him up and run if they lost. It seems it would be a race between Vuillon's Hell's Paradise Goala, that looks like a giant Koala, and Ryan and his Sand bear, Keiji. It seems that not only can the Goala run very fast, it's also carnivorous. Can Keiji and Ryan outrun and defeat the Goala or will Conrad have to keep his promise and take Yuri and run for it?
24	"Unforgivable"; Transliteration: "Yurusarezaru Mono" (Japanese: 許されざる者)	October 16, 2004
Hube is returned to the Demon Kingdom and it seems that no one likes him. Greta tells Yuri that Hube had once told her that he'd done something unforgivable. But what? Then they hear that it has something to do with a woman named Julia. But who was she? Yuri learns through Gisela what exactly happened to Julia and why everyone blamed Hube.
25	"Past and Future"; Transliteration: "Kako to Mirai" (Japanese: 過去と未来)	October 23, 2004
Hube once again attacks Yuri and Conrad defends him. Gwendal decides that Hube must die for his crimes. Both Greta and Nicola do their best to try to help Hube. But will their help be enough? Will Hube be killed or will he live to see his child born? After Nicola's baby boy is born Yuri decides to adopt Greta. Yuuri is finally able to return home.
26	"The Full Circle of Life"; Transliteration: "Meguru Inochi no Hate de" (Japanese: 巡る命の果てで)	October 30, 2004
Conrad thinks about how life seems to continue on, though more slowly, when Yuri is not around. He recalls a tragedy at the end of the war 20 years ago, and remembers the time he went to Earth to deliver the Maou's soul to a certain mother-to-be.
27	"Conrad's Arm"; Transliteration: "Konraddo no ude" (Japanese: コンラッドの腕)	November 6, 2004
Yuri is suddenly pulled back to the other world but instead of ending up in a water source as usual he ends up in a barrel of alcohol. Günter and Conrad soon arrive with Greta in tow. It seems there's unrest with the humans wanting to start a war and that Conrad and the others did not summon Yuri this time. If anything they are more desperate to send him back to Earth! Greta was riding with Conrad and Yuri with Günter when Günter is shot by an arrow! Conrad instructs Yuri and Greta to go to the church but as soon as he locks the door these weird guys with guns show up! Conrad tells him to throw holy water on a painting and that it will send him home. However during the battle Yuri witnesses Conrad fight and then lose his arm before he's knocked into the painting. He is sent home... or is he? What happened to Conrad and Greta did they make it out of the fire too?
28	"Atrocious Reunion"; Transliteration: "Kyouaku na Saikai" (Japanese: 凶悪な再会)	November 13, 2004
Yuri soon learns that for the first time he is not alone. Somehow Murata has also ended up in the other world with him. They are told about the owner of a nearby castle and go there. Adalbert and a man named Maxine also show up. Yuri hoped that Adalbert would not recognize him with a hat and sunglasses on but he does. When the country's guards appear Adalbert and Maxine run but then Yuri realizes that the weapons are the same as the ones from the battle Conrad was in. Upset, he uses his magic and takes care of the guards. Meanwhile Jozak who'd been in disguise in the same town sends a letter informing The Demon Kingdom of Yuri's location. Meanwhile, Günter's body recovers but now he has to deal with a new form for his soul to live in while his body recovers.
29	"Chilling Overture"; Transliteration: "Senritsu no Jyoshou" (Japanese: 戦慄の序章)	November 20, 2004
Yuri, Murata and Lady Flynn are on a ship carrying cargo, passengers and prisoners. They're heading towards Big Shimaron when it is attacked by Small Shimaron. Lady Flynn not wanting to lose Yuri, grabs him and they go overboard. Murata goes in after them, not wanting to be left alone. Jozak, in disguise, then releases all the sheep and prisoners. The sheep can become big flotation devices. But now that they're on land, are they really safe?
30	"A Forbidden Box"; Transliteration: "Kinjirareta Hako" (Japanese: 禁じられた箱)	November 27, 2004
Yuri learns of the Four Forbidden boxes that will bring destruction. Murata seems to know a lot more about this world than he should, raising questions as to his true identity. Murata and Jozak devise a plan to rescue Yuri and escape. However, in the end, when Murata's life is in danger, Yuri refuses to run away and leave anyone behind again.
31	"The Ends of the Earth"; Transliteration: "Chi no Hate" (Japanese: 地の果て)	December 4, 2004
It seems Murata may be someone of importance. We learn that Conrad's arm may be the key to releasing the power of the box. Yet, if it's not the right key, then the box will become out of control. If the box gets out of control, does Yuri have what it takes to stop it?
32	"The Locked Memory"; Transliteration: "Kagi Kakerareta Kioku" (Japanese: 鍵をかけられた記憶)	December 11, 2004
Ken Murata is something more than simply Yuri's friend; he also holds a high place in the Demon society. Thanks to Jozak, Gwendal comes to Caloria bringing with him aid for the wounded and homeless. Despite not wanting help from the Demons, the citizens of Caloria grudgingly accept their help after some persuasive talks. Finally a messenger arrives from Big Shimaron informing the populace that the Ultimate Tournament is about to begin.
33	"Run For It! The Snow Sled Race"; Transliteration: "Gekisou! Yuki Zori Re-su" (Japanese: 激走!雪ゾリレース)	December 18, 2004
Every four years the Ultimate Tournament is held and Yuri enters on Caloria's behalf. In order to qualify for the tournament he must win the preliminary race from East Nilson to Lambeil. Yuri races to become the winner of the preliminary but as he soon finds out many challenges await him including Maxine with his vengeful manju attack!
34	"Hot Battle Coliseum!?"; Transliteration: "Nettou Koroshiamu" (Japanese: 熱闘コロシアム!?)	January 8, 2005
The Ultimate tournament begins with Wolfram taking the first fighting position. After his battle Jozak battles with Adalbert who has entered this tournament solely for a chance to fight with Yuri. The group runs into trouble when Lady Flynn is captured and held as ransom for them forfeit the tournament. What can Yuri do to help Lady Flynn and who is the masked lady that claims to protect love?
35	"Snow Covered Earth"; Transliteration: "Yuki Furu Daichi" (Japanese: 雪降る大地)	January 15, 2005
Yuri is about to begin his battle, fortunately Lady Flynn is safe and he can fight the next opponent with all his might. But as he soon finds out his battle will become very complicated when someone he trusts is fighting on the opponents side. And when Adalbert joins the battle Yuri winds up fighting for his life!
36	"Farewell, Conrad"; Transliteration: "Saraba Konraddo" (Japanese: さらばコンラッド)	January 22, 2005
King Belar declares that Big Shimaron is the winner of this year's Ultimate Tournament and orders Caloria's representatives to be arrested. This leads Yuri and the others to make an escape with the help of Fanbalen, Lady Celi's current love interest. With Fanbalen's help they are able to escape with the box The End of the Wind in tow. Conrad is not with them and it looks as if he will not return to the Demon Kingdom.
37	"Whereabouts of the Boxes"; Transliteration: "Hako no Yukue" (Japanese: 箱の行方)	January 29, 2005
The episode starts with Conrad's dream, where someone appears to him an arm. Yuri is back on Earth depressed thinking about Conrad. Then later meets Murata at the park. Yuri tries to get Murata to help him get back to the other world, Murata decides to help Yuri back to the other world. When they reach the other would, Wolfram, Günter, Greta and Ulrike are there to greet them. Gwendal soon shows up and apologizes for Conrad's misconduct assuming he will get punished. It is revealed that Murata, or rather the great sage was the one who made the 4 forbidden boxes, so in turn Yuri wants Murata to explain them a little. As well as their connection to the Weller Family. Conrad is reading when he is summoned, he is soon informed that Big Shimaron is in contact with another Box. Yuri and the others become aware that Big Shimaron is after another Box and goes after it as well.
38	"Günter vs. Conrad"; Transliteration: "Gyunta- VS Konraddo" (Japanese: ギュンターVSコンラッド)	February 5, 2005
Yuri and his group travel to Cavalcade and meet Mr. Heathcrife who can help them get into a secluded land called Francia. The king of Francia refuses to choose either the Demon or the Big Shimaron side. Conrad with his Big Shimaron goons are also in Francia and are also after the box. Will Günter accept Conrad's betrayal or will he be forced to kill him?
39	"Your Name is Demon King"; Transliteration: "Kimi no Na wa MAou" (Japanese: 君の名は㋮王)	February 12, 2005
Lyla, the king's helper, takes it upon herself to show Yuri and the others around and to help them look for the forbidden box. After many hours of fruitless searching Yuri and the others are told that the box has been found in an old esoteric training ground. However when they arrive at the ruins they find the troops of Big Shimaron waiting to ambush them. Will they escape from this trap and manage to find the forbidden box?

=== Season 2 ===
Opening theme song: "Hateshinaku Tooi Sora Ni" (果てしなく遠い空に) by The Stand Up

Ending theme song: "Arigatou" (ありがとう～) by BON'Z

No.	Title	Original airdate
40	"For Our Bonds"; Transliteration: "Kizuna no Tame ni" (Japanese: 絆のために)	April 2, 2005
Big Shimaron has taken control of Francia making escape hard for Yuri and the others. Conrad forces Jozak off a cliff as an answer to the question of his betrayal. When King Belar shows up Conrad is told to execute Yuri.
41	"Conrad's Return"; Transliteration: "Konraddo no Kikan" (Japanese: コンラッドの帰還)	April 9, 2005
Francia has made Conrad a prisoner and decided to join in alliance with the Demon Kingdom. When Conrad escapes from his cell Yuri and the others must chase him down and hopefully find out his reasons for his betrayal. Can Conrad be forgiven and if he is will he be able to leave Francia with his life?
42	"Distant Promise"; Transliteration: "Tooi Yakusoku" (Japanese: 遠い約束)	April 16, 2005
Yuri's older brother Shori reminisces about a time in Yuri's youth when he would call him his "big brother." When things look bad for the Shibuya parents, Shori takes his little brother away for a day at the amusement park. Find out what happens when little Yuri accidentally spills his ice cream on a thugs pants.
43	"Baby Panic at Covenant Castle"; Transliteration: "Ketsumei Jyou Bebi- Panikku!" (Japanese: 血盟城ベビーパニック!)	April 23, 2005
Baby Ernst, Eru for short, the son of Hube, and several other noble born children are gathered at Covenant Castle for the "Great Birth Ceremony." After Yuri volunteers to look after baby Eru he finds out that taking care of a baby is harder than he expected especially when Eru turns out to be "special." What happens when Eru gets his hands on Anisina's latest invention, a device that allows the wearer to talk with animals?
44	"The Phantom Girl"; Transliteration: "Maboroshi no Shōjo" (Japanese: 幻の少女)	April 30, 2005
A mysterious girl who bears a strong resemblance to Ulrike is seen being mischievous around town. Meanwhile back in the Tomb of the Great One Ulrike is sick and unable to perform her normal tasks. When it turns out that the mystery girl has amazing magic powers it's up to Yuri, Conrad and Wolfram to get her under control.
45	"The Betrothed vs The Fiance"; Transliteration: "Iinazuke VS Konyakusha" (Japanese: 許婚VS婚約者)	May 7, 2005
Stoffel has plans to set up Yuri with an appropriate princess thereby cementing his ties with the current ruler of the kingdom. When Princess Elizabeth, the current winner of the Demon Kingdoms beauty pageant, shows up Yuri is faced with a battle between his current fiancé and the new princess. Will Yuri's devotions be transferred to this new princess or will this princess reveal an entirely different agenda?
46	"The Priestess in the Forest"; Transliteration: "Mori no Miko" (Japanese: 森の巫女)	May 14, 2005
Yuri and co. have gone through many boxes in order to find the last box but coming up empty. They learn of a box in a lake and go to investigate. There they meet a girl, who turns out to be Urike's predecessor. They find out that this lake and land were barren before the arrival of the box. If they remove the box the lake and the land will die. Yuri wants to leave it and just guard it but when Big Shimaron shows up to take it not knowing or caring if it's the real thing or not. Can they stop them and save the lake and the land or must it be sacrificed?
47	"Proof Of Life"; Transliteration: "Inochi no Akashi" (Japanese: いのちの証)	May 21, 2005
Dunheely, Conrad's father, has trouble getting along with Gwendal especially when Gwendal despises him. When Dunheely has Gwendal join him in helping a secluded town of outcasts Gwendal must learn to see his step-father as the person he truly is. Will Gwendal's prejudices get in the way of saving the mistreated villagers?
48	"Big Shimaron Strikes Back!"; Transliteration: "Gyakushou, Dai Shimaron!" (Japanese: 逆襲、大シマロン!)	May 28, 2005
After having their box stolen by the Maou, Big Shimaron finds a new way to impose power over the allied countries: an "overseas study exchange". However, The Great Demon Kingdom and the allied towns are not stupid. In order to put an end to Belal's ambitions, Gwendal offers himself to go negotiate with him on Van da Via island, hiding his true intentions to the Maou.
49	"The Lion and The Wolf"; Transliteration: "Shishi to Ookami" (Japanese: 獅子と狼)	June 4, 2005
Adalbert has taken King Yuri hostage and demands to know if Yuri does in fact have Julia's soul. Big Shimaron's troops try to capture Yuri prompting Adalbert to try and save him. They are caught against the side of a cliff with an active volcano as a backdrop. When the volcano decides to erupt will everyone be able to leave the island safely?
50	"My Beloved Julia"; Transliteration: "Ware ga Itoshiki Juria" (Japanese: 我が愛しきジュリア)	June 11, 2005
Panic consumes the troops of both nations and Big Shimaron's king decides to leave the children he already has in order to escape the volcano's fury. Adalbert decides to fight Conrad now and unleash all of his pent up sadness and fury over Julia's death. Will the children be saved and will Conrad be able to escape from Adalbert's emotions?
51	"Revenge Fiend? Maxine"; Transliteration: "Fukushouki? Makishi-n" (Japanese: 復讐鬼?マキシーン)	June 18, 2005
Maxine still has not given up hope of returning to his country and becoming wealthy and powerful. When he kidnaps Yuri and tries to escape he runs into one of Yuri's devoted subjects and is forced to abandon his plan. In his desperation he decides to hold the three maids as hostages. Will he make it out of this alive or will he be forced to take even more drastic measures?
52	"Conrad Standing Tall"; Transliteration: "Daichi Tatsu Konra-to" (Japanese: 大地立つコンラート)	June 25, 2005
When Yuri stumbles upon the "Demon Mirror" he's transported back to the time when Lady Celi ruled with the help of Stoffel. Yuri winds up meeting Lady Julia and comes to understand why she was loved by so many people. Yuri and Julia must watch as Conrad and the Luttenburg Division set out towards a suicidal battle in order to prove their loyalty to the kingdom. Yuri helps Julia to make a decision that she knows will hurt the one she loves most dearly.
53	"Dear King Yuri"; Transliteration: "Zenryaku, Yu-ri Heika" (Japanese: 前略、ユーリ陛下)	July 2, 2005
Günter sets off on a "Nationwide Tour" in order to better understand the "Common People." He comes to a town modeled after the old west and discovers that the town is full of fear and that only one person holding it together is a girl by the name of Gloria. Can Günter help this forgotten town survive and can he convince the people that the Demon King has not forgotten them?
54	"The Holy Sword and The Demon Sword (Part 1)"; Transliteration: "Seiken to Maken (Zenpen)" (Japanese: 聖剣と魔剣・前編)	July 9, 2005
A man cloaked in shadows shows up wielding the power of the holy sword. Yuri's followers suspect that Alford is behind a series of bandit attacks where the holy sword had been spotted. Who is the strange cloaked man? Why does he change people into heartless bandits?
55	"The Holy Sword and The Demon Sword (Part 2)"; Transliteration: "Seiken to Maken (Kouhen)" (Japanese: 聖剣と魔剣・後編)	July 16, 2005
Yuri and the others go to check out the rumors about the Holy Sword and stumble upon a man possessed with demonic energy who wields the Holy Sword. Alford shows up in search of his sword and winds up helping Yuri and the others retrieve it. It might take Morgif's full powers to defeat the new owner of the Holy Sword. Will Yuri be able to handle Morgif's new powers and why does Murata sense that they are running out of time?
56	"The Shadow Begins to Move"; Transliteration: "Ugokidasu Kage" (Japanese: 動き出す影)	August 27, 2005
A mysterious masked man with hypnotizing powers walks into King Belar's castle unhindered leaving us with many questions yet to be answered. Back in the Demon Kingdom Yuri is holding a party for the Alliance members. When Conrad's left arm and Gwendal's left eye begin to hurt they can not help but have a sense of looming disaster. Faceless puppets attack Yuri at the party and run off with Wolfram. Yuri follows them without thinking and rushes off to save him.
57	"The Creature From the Darkness"; Transliteration: "Yami Kara Kita Mamono" (Japanese: 闇から来た魔物)	September 3, 2005
Yuri is captured along with Wolfram and taken to Big Cimarion in order to be handed over to a hypnotized King Belar. Their transport is attacked by bandits who are led by a familiar face. The two of them are taken to the bandit's hideout where they find old enemies who have become reasonably good people. The masked figure sends a giant blue dog-like demon and several small dog-like demons to attack the hideout and retrieve Wolfram and Yuri. Yuri's power, in the form of water dragons, is little match for the power of the unusual beast master. Will Yuri be able to overcome these strange new foes and can anyone help him?
58	"The King of Chaos"; Transliteration: "Konton no Ou" (Japanese: 混沌の王)	September 10, 2005
Yuri decides to confront King Belar and try to convince him to stop fighting. He goes off with his crew and Adalbert in tow towards the King's Castle. After many confrontations with more puppets Adalbert tells Conrad and Wolfram to take Yuri to Belar while they finished off the puppets. When Yuri arrives in the king's throne room he learns that King Belar is being controlled also. When they are attacked by allies it's up to Yuri to use all of his skills and resources to save them all. Who is this enemy that has knowledge from the time of the Original King and where is the final missing forbidden box?
59	"Demons, to Earth"; Transliteration: "Mazoku, Chikyuu e" (Japanese: 魔族、地球へ)	September 17, 2005
Ulrike reveals that the final forbidden box is on Earth. Yuri, along with Murata, Wolfram, Conrad and Gwendal set off to locate and bring the box back to The Demon Kingdom. Günter was also dragged along by mistake. Yuri is shocked to discover that his family already knew about the other world the whole time. Meanwhile, Günter was separated from the rest of the group and is lost somewhere in the city.
60	"Big Brothers Anguish"; Transliteration: "Onichan no Nayami" (Japanese: お兄ちゃんの悩み)	September 24, 2005
Yuri takes the group on a sightseeing trip while waiting for Bob, the Maou of the Earth to contact them. Shori meets up with Rodriguez, who ask a favour from him. He asks Shori to persuade Conrad and the others to return to their own world. After seeing Shori's failed attempts, Rodriguez attacks Conrad with magic and tries to force him back to the other world. Why is Rodriguez doing this? And is he doing this on his own or following the orders of someone else?
61	"Another Demon King"; Transliteration: "Mou Hitori no Maou" (Japanese: もう一人の魔王)	October 1, 2005
Yuri and co. travel to Switzerland after discovering that Bob is currently staying there. Yuri is shocked when he finds his parents followed him there and they travel together to meet Bob on a bus that was sent to fetch them. When they reach their destination, Shori separates Yuri from the rest of the group and once again tries to persuade him to stop being the demon king and come home but he is interrupted. They then continue on to Bob's office, ignoring his warnings. Meanwhile, Günter, who was working as a model to earn money, is taken away during a blackout at a photo shoot.
62	"Entrusted Hope"; Transliteration: "Takusareta Kibou" (Japanese: 託された希望)	October 8, 2005
Yuri and Bob battle with magic and Yuri wins. Bob decides to entrust the final forbidden box to Yuri.
63	"Showdown! The Demon King VS The Boney Corps"; Transliteration: "MAou VS Kohhi Gundan" (Japanese: 対決!㋮王VSコッヒー軍団)	October 15, 2005
The Kohi and many animals are acting up due to the fear of all of the forbidden box's are gathered together. Yuri manages to gain their trust and calms them.
64	"The Return Of Snow Günter"; Transliteration: "Yuki Gyunta-Futatabi" (Japanese: 雪ギュンター再び)	October 22, 2005
Günter is poisoned again and Suzanna Julia's retired father visits the Demon Kingdom to release him and him and Yuri talk of Julia. But then, Günter's body unexpectedly moves on its own.
65	"One Who Braves Through the Snow"; Transliteration: "Shirogane wo Yukusha" (Japanese: 白銀を往く者)	October 29, 2005
It seems that one of the maids has been affected by miasma, a disease that makes the person unable to trust anyone. Yuri, Wolfram, Jozak and Conrad must obtain a rare herb on a mountain to cure the maid but how will they succeed if they are affected by it too?
66	"Willpower"; Transliteration: "Omou Chikara" (Japanese: 想う力)	November 19, 2005
Yuri along with Conrad, Murata, and Wolfram travel back to earth in order to get something Yuri left behind. They are unable to return to their world because of the box removed from Earth and they travel to Switzerland where Bob is to ask for assistance.
67	"A Bridge to Tomorrow"; Transliteration: "Ashita ni Kakeru Hashi" (Japanese: 明日に架ける橋)	November 26, 2005
Human villagers decide to build a bridge between the land of humans and the Mazoku. But they are being attacked by mysterious light wolves believed to be the ghosts of the war 20 years ago. Adalbert and his allies; who are hired by the villagers have some trouble defending the humans from the wolves. While defending the bridge, Adalbert and Günter put aside their differences in order to protect Yuri.
68	"The Glorious Era"; Transliteration: "Eikou no Jidai" (Japanese: 栄光の時代)	December 3, 2005
Günter teaches Yuri about the past of The Great Demon Kingdom. The founding king Shinou, the Great Sage as well as the four families with the keys to the boxes are shown. Afterwards, Wolfram seems to be acting strangely.
69	"What Must be Protected"; Transliteration: "Mamoru Beki Mono" (Japanese: 守るべきもの)	December 10, 2005
Shori goes to The Great Demon Kingdom by accident after the lake in Switzerland pulls him in. He asks Yuri to stop the ceremony of the forbidden boxes and questions the Original King's decisions, He meets Cecile, Greta and Anissina and is pulled to town my Yuri. There, he observes Yuri interacting with the children and his people. Despite Yuri quelling his worries, Shori attempts to interfere with the ceremony and is assisted by Conrad where he shows his buried powers. It is revealed that Shori was right about the boxes as the seal is dissipating.
70	"The Forgotten Race"; Transliteration: "Wasurerareta Tami" (Japanese: 忘れられた民)	December 17, 2005
A possessed Wolfram offers to give Shori magical power to protect Yuri but before Shori can answer, an unexpected visitor arrives interrupting the conversation. As Ondine, Ulrike's predecessor, lays unconscious a storm rages on. Meanwhile, mysterious figures attack the castle. It appears that Seraphine, Ondine's older twin sister, was filled with rage when she was not chosen to become the next Genshin Miko and left her sister. Now, she is back and believes it is her job to destroy the keys to the four forbidden boxes. Shori, being taunted for being powerless, accepts Wolfram's offer. He finds himself now being able to control water. Back on Earth, Seraphine and her comrades attack Bob and flee after realizing that he is not a key.
71	"Big Brother's Rampage"; Transliteration: "Onichan Dai Bousou" (Japanese: お兄ちゃん大暴走)	January 7, 2006
Shori can now manipulate water and practices. Miko attempts to go to her sons in scuba diving equipment and ends up dragging her husband into freediving. While practicing, Shori loses some control. Seraphine attacks the temple and asks to speak to Shinou. When Yuri tries to reason with Seraphine and she attacks, Shori defends him but his powers seem to have taken over his reasoning for mercy so he and Yuri battle. Miko manages to get her voice and view into the fighting water powers and stops her sons.
72	"The Sealed One"; Transliteration: "Fuujirareshi Mono" (Japanese: 封じられしもの)	January 14, 2006
Yuri forgives Shori for his misdeed and consoles him by telling his admiration for him to use maryoku and recover so quickly. Greta and him cheer him up and she calls him Uncle. Shori expresses his worries about the sealing ceremony and Yuri tells him that it'd be fine with everyone there. They all head over to The Original King's Temple so that Yuri can carry out the ceremony where the boxes are steady leaking out their power.
73	"The Heartbeat of Darkness"; Transliteration: "Yami no Kodou" (Japanese: 闇の鼓動)	January 21, 2006
Yuri starts the ceremony but Wolfram suddenly attacks Yuri, distracting Yuri into messing up the ceremony. A dark figure appears and takes Conrad's left arm movement, Gwendal's left eye's sight and Wolfram's heartbeat as the keys to open the boxes. It absorbs the power from three boxes, revealing the translucent form of The Original King! Fortunately, Muarat had a plan, calling in Jozak who jumps in in time and Murata activates a trap, imprisoning Shinou. They withdraw and Yuri is told by Conrad that Wolfram's heart has stopped beating.
74	"The Ruler of Truth"; Transliteration: "Shinjitsu no Shihaisha" (Japanese: 真実の支配者)	January 28, 2006
Shinou praises his handpicked strategist and Wolfram is taken to Blood Pledge and Greta wonders if he had died. Anissina speculates that Wolfram still is alive and plans to freeze his body like Günter's when he was poisoned. Muarata reveals having three keys born to Cecile is Shinou's plan and that Soushu had possessed Shinou during the fighting thousands of years ago when Soushu wounded him. In the present, Shinou had been attracted to the power leaking from the boxes and absorbed by Soushu. Yuri and everyone else returns to Covenant Castle to form a plan to defeat The Original King and save Wolfram since one box is still left unopened.
75	"The Sun and the Moon"; Transliteration: "Taiyou to Tsuki" (Japanese: 太陽と月)	February 4, 2006
Yuri and co. head back to The Original King's Temple to retrieve the keys from The Original King. However, they are attacked by Soushu's army of dolls when they enter. On Earth, Soushu's powers attack the group in Switzerland. The masked man controlling Belal was revealed to be Soushu's shadow from the box's leaking power. Yuri forces his way through to Soushu, who escapes the breaking barrier. He returns the keys to their owners, as they are no longer needed as keys. Murata apologizes then pushes Yuri towards Soushu, allowing him to be captured since the world " does not need two suns ".
76	"Inside the Darkness"; Transliteration: "Kurayami no Naka de" (Japanese: 暗闇の中で)	February 11, 2006
Soushu enters Yuri's body to take it over from the inside. Conrad, Gwendal, Jozak, Hube and Günter awaken outside the temple and return to the castle, where Wolfram had been revived with his heartbeat returned to him. Meanwhile, Shori successfully practices with Ulrike to control his powers since it is all he can do. Shori spectualtes that all of Shin Makoku had been deceived by Shinou as all the activity around the boxes and Yuri was too much to be coincidental. At various countries, Soushu's shadows attack and Yuri wakes up in an empty house of his heart with Shinou. Günter takes out Erhard Wincott's diary to form a plan based on a hint given by Murata.
77	"The Descent of the Demon King"; Transliteration: "Maou Kourin" (Japanese: 魔王降臨)	February 18, 2006
Soushu has successfully taken over Yuri's heart by revealing why he chose him as the Maou—to be his body. Meanwhile, Günter and Dorcacos travel to Morgif's birthplace in order for him to reveal his true powers. Shori now has full control over his powers and the rest of the group heads over to temple to save Yuri but are shocked to find Murata saying Yuri now belonged to Shinou and now are forced to fight him. He tries to use Yuri's blood as the key to the fourth box, but Julia's pendant reacts to the act and transmits a vision of Julia into Yuri's soul, where she shows him his acts of courage from before and tells him he can save everyone. Just then, Günter and Dorcascos arrive with Morgif at full power.
78	"Until the Day We Meet Again"; Transliteration: "Mata Au Hi Made" (Japanese: ㋮た会う日まで)	February 25, 2006
Soushu is forced out of Yuri's heart and Yuri defeats him, causing Soushu's troops to disappear as well as Shinou's soul together with him who thanks him. Murata told Yuri that they can not travel again to the other world because Shinou had disappeared. Shinou opened one last portal and Yuri, Murata, and Shori decided to go back to Earth. Wolfram cries and Yuri bids him farewell. On Earth, they reappear in Switzerland. Shori works with Bob as his successor and Yuri worries over his actions and the people back there. In Shin Makoku, everyday life goes on with Conrad remembering Yuri's legacy. When Yuri takes his necklace close to the fountain it shines, so he begins to realize something. Then Murata suddenly pushes him into the lake and they arrive in the other world since Yuri has now surpassed Shinou to the delight of everyone.

=== OVA ===
Opening theme song: "Romantic Morning" (ロマンチック・モーニング) by The Stand Up

Ending theme song: "Hitsuyou no Pocket" (秘密のポケット) by The Stand Up

No.	Title	Original airdate
1	"Young Boy King of Small Shimaron (Part 1)"; Transliteration: "Shou Shimaron no Shōnen Ou (Zenpen)" (Japanese: 小シマロンの少年王（前編）)	October 26, 2007
Yuri escapes from his brother's attempt to tutor him in world history but Günter then tries to teach him. He travels to Caloria and at a sheep hot spring resort with Conrad and Josak, meets the king of Small Shimaron, Saralegi where they discuss the conscripted soldiers and an alliance between Small Shimaron and Shin Makoku where Sara expresses his admiration for him and his desire for Yuri to come to his country with him for assistance. He appears to be hypnotizing Yuri when he removes his glasses. They all travel with Sara and Murata drags Shori to Shin Makoku at the request of Shinou.
2	"Who are the Laurels for" Transliteration: "Eikan wa dare ga tame ni" (Japanese: 栄冠は誰がために)	November 30, 2007
Günter decides to hold an open world-wide festival and tournament in honor of King Yuri. The group wanders around the booths with Greta and they see a Miss World Drag Queen Pageant where Yuri and Wolfram participate in for Cecile who is judging. Josak wins the title. Adelbert, Conrad, Alford, Wolfram and Hube compete in the fighting tournament. The maids discover a group of bandits and are encountered by Gwendol and Josak. They run into the match between Adelbert and Conrad. Everyone collaborates on fighting the bandits but one of the bandits get ahold of Nikola and Eru as a shield and Yuri gets angry. Gisela, Yuri and Conrad send Adelbert off as the night ends with a banquet.
3	"Dry Wind"; Transliteration: "Kawaita Kaze" (Japanese: 乾いた風)	December 28, 2007
An old invention from the temple that tells the futures of lovers comes to Blood Pledge and causes a buzz. Ulrike muses to Murata that it once caused great tragedy and she should have thrown it. Anissina tests it out on Hube and Nikola and it turns out to simply reveal lovers compatibility and later mentioned that if the Devil's Mirror is inserted into it, then it will reveal the future. The Mirror has gone missing and Wolfram kidnaps Yuri into the invention with the Mirror. Wolfram is revealed to be possessed by Shinou and he kisses Yuri activating the device which promptly burns out. It turns out to be Shinou's prank and he appears in miniature form to explain. Wolfram tells Yuri that he wanted to see Yuri's future where he sees himself competing with many maidens while Yuri hands out flowers and Yuri sees Wolfram with another man. It turns out to be the future the viewer fears the most; thus the tragedy of splitting up couples.
4	"Maiden love" Transliteration: "Ai no Shōjo" (Japanese: 愛の乙女)	February 29, 2008
Gwendal gives Greta a squirrel which she mistakes for a fox and she thanks him with a kiss. During reconstruction, a single pink Bear Bee cocoon is found. An uproar of dragons occurs who have been attacking a village has been asked to be exterminated. The pink cocoon is revealed to be a sign of a dragon rebellion. The only way to calm the dragons is to sacrifice the pink Bear Bee. Yuri must choose between sacrificing the cocoon or exterminating the dragons to stop their rampage. Yuri tries to reason with Pochi/Liesel but he ignores him so Yuri transforms and orders the sacrifice of the cocoon. The Bear Bee hatches and splits up into many pink Bear Bees which calm and kinden the dragons. Every thousand years in unison with the dragon rebellion, there is one who spreads love. A true maiden offered affection and respect. The success of the pink Bear Bees is credited to Gwendal's love.
5	"Young Boy King of Small Shimaron (Part 2)"; Transliteration: "Shou Shimaron no Shōnen Ou (Kouhen)" (Japanese: 小シマロンの少年王（後編）)	March 28, 2008
Ulrike remarks to Shori that Yuri's normally bright light was getting hard to see. Shori, Murata, Günter and Adelbert hurry to Small Shimaron to help Josak and Conrad protect Yuri from Sara who Adelbert describes as a scoundrel. Yuri comforts Sara about his loneliness and Wolfram gets jealous as Yuri held Sara's hand. Sara uses suggestive hypnotism to force Wolfram into bring Yuri to him. Meanwhile, Conrad fights Berius, Sara's bodyguard as they fight to get to Yuri's side, Sara wants to use Yuri's powers for himself. Yuri goes into Maou form and Murata borrows Shori to charge Morgif to assist Yuri. Yuri tells Sara that they are friends and Sara admits defeat.

=== Season 3 ===
Opening theme song: "Sekai Yo Warae" (世界よ笑え) by Yoshida Shougo with M-Tone

Ending theme song: "Going" by Yoshida Jungo

No. overall	No. in season	Title	Original airdate
79	1	"Demon King, Once Again"; Transliteration: "MAou, Futatabi" (Japanese: ㋮王、再び)	April 3, 2008
Yuri and Murata return to The Demon Kingdom. Günter is preparing for the Maou's 16th birthday where Yuri will determine his path as an adult, Wolfram is on his way back from the Bielefelt lands. It turns out that while Yuri was away, the Ten Noble Family had chosen a new Maoh, which turns out to be Wolfram!
80	2	"Demon King's Requirements"; Transliteration: "MAou no Jyouken" (Japanese: ㋮王の条件)	April 10, 2008
Yuri goes through with the ceremony and soon finds himself in The Original King's temple where he has to make the final decision. He meets The Original King himself, who tells Yuri that he will eliminate anyone who dares oppose Yuri being king.
81	3	"Demon King's Decision"; Transliteration: "MAou no Ketsui" (Japanese: ㋮王の決意)	April 17, 2008
After Yuri's decision is final, Wolfram brakes off the engagement in order to avoid any conflict and returns to the Bielefelt lands. Yuri pursues him and they have a duel. Yuri then uses his powers to defend himself and Wolfram, and to prove he is worthy of being king.
82	4	"Greta and Yuram"; Transliteration: "Gureta to Yu-ramu" (Japanese: グレタとユーラム)	April 24, 2008
When merchants come to The Demon Kingdom's capital to sell miniature bearbees, the whole town is turned upside down. Greta convinces Yuri and Wolfram to buy her one, but the merchants give her one piece of advice: never get her bearbee soaked in water. They soon discover why.
83	5	"Laila's Wedding"; Transliteration: "Raira no Kekkon" (Japanese: ライラの結婚)	May 1, 2008
During one of his study sessions, Yuri receives an invitation to attend Lyla and king Antoine Jean Le Pierre's wedding. However, the king announces that the special sword of his country, the one needed for them to get married, had gone missing. Yuri promises to find the lost sword.
84	6	"Infultrate! Big Shimaron"; Transliteration: "Sennyuu! Dai Shimaron" (Japanese: 潜入!大シマロン)	May 8, 2008
Murata, Jozak and Conrad travel to Big Shimaron to obtain something that Murata had left behind without Yuri's knowledge. Yuri and Wolfram find out and follow them in Celi's ship.
85	7	"The Night of the Banquet"; Transliteration: "Utage no Yoru ni" (Japanese: 宴の夜に)	May 15, 2008
Yuri and Wolfram attends a banquet disguised as girls. It is there where Yuri meets Saralegi for the first time. Yuri was exposed while Wolfram escaped with Adalbert's help.
86	8	"Captured Demon King"; Transliteration: "Toware no MAou" (Japanese: 囚われの㋮王)	May 22, 2008
Murata, Jozak and Conrad infiltrate the castle and manage to find a box full of swords. When an intruder alarm is sounded, Murata discovers it was not them that had been found. He realizes with dismay that Yuri had followed them there. They met up with Wolfram and Adalbert and return to their hideout to plan Yuri's escape. Meanwhile, Yuri was captured by the White Crows and imprisoned in a cell. Jeneus, a member of the White Crows, offers to help Yuri escape as he does not want a war between Big Shimaron and The Demon Kingdom but was turned down by Yuri who believed that Conrad would come to save him. Conrad, dressed in his old Big Shimaron military outfit pretends to come for the throne as he has a right to it, sneaks into the castle and waits for Murata's orders to save Yuri.
87	9	"Black Jeneus"; Transliteration: "Kuro no Jeneusu" (Japanese: 黒のジェネウス)	May 29, 2008
Lanzhil, in order to get rid of both Conrad and Yuri, orders Conrad to execute Yuri to prove his loyalty to Big Shimaron, knowing that he would not do it. Conrad cuts off the cuffs on Yuri's hands and prepares to fight as White Crow members appear and attack them with esoteric magic. Murata, Jozak and Wolfram arrive, helping Conrad who was not able to defeat the monsters created with esoteric magic. Meanwhile, Adalbert appears in front of Lanzhil, preparing to capture him. He is stopped by Yuri, who used his magic when Jeneus attacked Murata. He used up too much power and fell unconscious. Fortunately, they manage to escape successfully.
88	10	"Conrad and Günter"; Transliteration: "Konraddo to Gyunta-" (Japanese: コンラッドとギュンター)	June 5, 2008
Yuri and co. visits the academy where Conrad trained to become a soldier. After Yuri gives a speech which no one really understood, Conrad challenged Günter to a duel where Conrad gives his answer to a question that Günter asked him a long time ago.
89	11	"The Bride is Anissina!?"; Transliteration: "Hanayome wa Anishina!?" (Japanese: 花嫁はアニシナ!?)	June 12, 2008
It turns out that Anissina's brother has set her up with a suitor for her to marry.
90	12	"The Hero and the Three Swords"; Transliteration: "Yuusha to Sanbon no Ken" (Japanese: 勇者と三本の剣)	June 19, 2008
Yuri, while visiting Caloria, was attacked by members of the White Crow but fortunately was saved by Al while Wolfram and Conrad were busy fighting. It turns out that the White Crow had been in pursuit of Al for quite a while to obtain the sword that Al had with him. Jeneus appeared while they were staying and demand that the three swords to be handed over or else Caloria would be destroyed. Yuri later discovered with dismay that the whole thing was a delusion and was determined to get the swords back.
91	13	"Small Shimaron's King Saralegi"; Transliteration: "Shou Shimaron Ou Sararegi-" (Japanese: 小シマロン王サラレギー)	June 26, 2008
While trying to obtain the swords, Yuri and co. were tricked and attacked by the White Crows. Fortunately, Saralegi turns up and releases them from the trap. They then pursue the Jeneus in order to get back the swords. Yuri and Al managed to get their swords back but the third sword was still missing.
92	14	"Moon Reflected in the Water"; Transliteration: "Mizu ni Utsuru Tsuki" (Japanese: 水に映る月)	July 3, 2008
Yuri, Conrad, Wolfram and Murata returns to Earth so that Yuri is able to take his final exam. Due to Anissina's latest invention, Yuri and Shori ended up switching bodies!
93	15	"Wind's Lullaby"; Transliteration: "Kaze no Komoriuta" (Japanese: 風の子守歌)	August 7, 2008
Greta's past is revealed.
94	16	"The Wincott Inheritance"; Transliteration: "Uinkotto no Isan" (Japanese: ウィンコットの遺産)	August 14, 2008
An old invention that was created a long time ago is found.
95	17	"Invitation to Small Shimaron"; Transliteration: "Shou Shimaron e no Shoutai" (Japanese: 小シマロンへの招待)	August 21, 2008
Sara invites Yuri to Small Shimaron to make an alliance with The Great Demon Kingdom. They were attacked while having a discussion.
96	18	"Two Kings"; Transliteration: "Futari no Ou" (Japanese: 二人の王)	August 28, 2008
Yuri and Sara returns to the latter's castle where Yuri meets Sara's trusted subordinate, Gerard. It is later revealed that he had betrayed the king for Big Shimaron as he did not approve of the alliance. Sara and Yuri was separated from the rest of the group while escaping the army. After being cornered in Sara's room, he pushes Yuri out of the window to avoid being captured.
97	19	"King's Protector"; Transliteration: "Ou no Shugosha" (Japanese: 王の守護者)	September 4, 2008
Sara is captured while Yuri manages to escape with the help of his subjects but Yuri is determined to go back and save Sara. Murata and Günter distracts the army by acting as decoys while Yuri, Wolfram, Jozak and Conrad infiltrates the castle.
98	20	"For a Friend"; Transliteration: "Tomo no Tame ni" (Japanese: 友のために)	September 11, 2008
Big Shimaron has crossed over to Small Shimaron to capture Yuri. They were planning to escape but Yuri decides to observe the meeting between Sara and the Big Shimaron messengers through a hidden room. This plan went wrong when Gerard, under the influence of Sara's Houryoku, attacked Sara and Yuri bursts out to protect him. Sara is then forced to hand over Yuri while Conrad promises to rescue him. However, just as Yuri and Sara is nearing Big Shimaron's army, an arrow was shot and Sara takes the blow that was meant for Yuri. Yuri was enraged and went into a rampage to destroy Big Shimaron's army.
99	21	"Bitter Parting"; Transliteration: "Nigai Wakare" (Japanese: 苦い別れ)	September 18, 2008
It is revealed that Berias is the one who shot the arrow under the orders of Sara so that he can gain Yuri's trust. Meanwhile, Yuri and his group set off to return to The Great Demon Kingdom but were attacked by Big Shimaron's army. Fortunately, Gwendal arrives with reinforcements before Yuri is captured.
100	22	"People of the Round Table"; Transliteration: "Entaku no Hitobito" (Japanese: 円卓の人々)	October 9, 2008
After Yuri went to Small Shimaron, the heads of the ten noble families summons him to a meeting around the round table to know his motives. However, the meeting is shortened when Yuri decides to play a game of "Shinoued Away" with them.
101	23	"El's Kidnapping"; Transliteration: "Eru Yuukaijiken" (Japanese: エル誘拐事件)	October 16, 2008
Just as Yuri and Murata are about to head for The Great Demon Kingdom, Shori surprises them as he jumps in with them and ends up pulling them further away than they planned. They were surprised to see Nicola and Hube and were shocked when they found out that Nicola and Hube had not had their wedding yet. Yuri immediately decides to plan a wedding for them. El was kidnapped during the ceremony.
102	24	"The Chosen One"; Transliteration: "Erarebareshimono" (Japanese: 選ばれし者)	October 23, 2008
Shori chases the White Crows and manages to rescue El by using magic. For them, while Yuri and group was heading back to Covenant Castle, they were once again attacked by The White Crows. Shori jumps off the carriage to attack the White Crows and prevent them from attacking Yuri. But after an exhausting fight, Shori passed out and was captured by the White Crows.
103	25	"Pursuit Across the Plains"; Transliteration: "Arano no Tsuiseki" (Japanese: 荒野の追跡)	October 30, 2008
As Jeneus is about to escape with Shori through a ship, Yuri and co. arrives and attempts to stop him. Just as Yuri is about to blast the boat, he stops as he did not want to hurt Shori, allowing Jeneus to escape successfully.
104	26	"White Crows"; Transliteration: "Shiroi Karasu" (Japanese: 白い鴉)	November 6, 2008
Murata informs everyone that his memories of his past life has been transferred to Jeneus and that Jeneus is just a copy of the real person from the past. He then tells them that the White Crows had probably brought Shori to Big Shimaron as they were taking refuge there. They traveled there and met up with Jozak and Adalbert.
105	27	"Divine Sword"; Transliteration: "Shinken" (Japanese: 神剣)	November 13, 2008
Alazon explains the history of Seisakoku to Shori while Yuri and co. takes refuge at a hideout prepared for them. Adalbert reveals that he had managed to successfully infiltrate the White Crows with the help of Velma. Meanwhile, Shori debates whether to help and made his decision with the help of Jeneus.
106	28	"Into Motion"; Transliteration: "Hatsudou" (Japanese: 発動)	November 20, 2008
Shori follows Alazon and unleashes the power of the sword on Big Shimaron's army which had come to destroy the White Crows. He loses control of the sword and turns everyone into statues. Yuri, who was escaping, noticed the commotion and rushes back to save Shori. He manages to calm the sword and turned everyone back to normal. They then return to The Great Demon Kingdom. Meanwhile, Big Shimaron decides to wage war with The Great Demon Kingdom.
107	29	"The edge of Imagination"; Transliteration: "Omoi No Hate" (Japanese: 思いの果て)	November 27, 2008
The Ten Nobles gathered together to have a meeting and questioned Yuri's motive to travel to Big Shimaron. They were suspicious of Shori and placed him under house arrest for associating with the enemy. After being confronted by Conrad, Shori reveals the truth to The Ten Nobles. Meanwhile, Yuri receives a letter from Sara informing him that he might be able to arrange a meeting between Yuri and the king of Big Shimaron. Conrad sneaks away on his own and is on his way to Small Shimaron.
108	30	"The Start of the War"; Transliteration: "Kaisen" (Japanese: 開戦)	December 4, 2008
Big Shimaron is approaching faster than everybody thought and Waltorana's troops has been mobilized. When Yuri, Murata and Shori attempt to get to Lanzhil's ship, they overshoot and arrive on Sara's ship instead. Sara uses his power on Yuri and forces him to lose control over his powers, causing him to destroy Big Shimaron's ships.
109	31	"Demon King Retiring"; Transliteration: "Maou Yamemasu" (Japanese: ㋮王辞めます)	December 11, 2008
Murata and Shori stops Yuri by pushing him overboard, sending him back to Earth along with Shori while Murata is transported to The Original King's Temple. When Yuri awakens, he finds himself unable to return to the other world. Bob explains that it was probably because of Yuri's mixed emotions. Yuri is shocked to find himself all grown up after falling asleep and finds himself experiencing a normal life. He learns that Shin Makoku does not exist until he met Bob and realizes it was all an illusion. He was not afraid any more and is able to return to the other world.
110	32	"Blowing Blue Wind"; Transliteration: "Fukinukeru Aoi Kaze" (Japanese: 吹き抜ける青い風)	December 18, 2008
When Yuri comes back, he realizes that Conrad is still in Big Shimaron and Wolfram has gone to fetch him back. On the way back, Conrad is ambushed by Berias. Conrad wins and Berias is brought back to The Great Demon Kingdom.
111	33	"Unexpected Meeting"; Transliteration: "Yokisenu Saikai" (Japanese: 予期せぬ再会)	December 25, 2008
Yuri sends a letter to Sara, informing him on the capture of Beria and inviting him to The Great Demon Kingdom to get him back. During the night, a mysterious spell was cast and put everybody to sleep. Alazon had infiltrated the castle and intends to capture Yuri for his power. At that very moment, Berias appears and reveals himself to be Alazon's brother and Sara the son of Alazon. Alazon was shocked to see them there and fled the castle.
112	34	"Holy Kingdom"; Transliteration: "Seinaru Oukoku" (Japanese: 聖なる王国)	January 8, 2009
Berias explains the past of Seisakoku to Sara. Sara was not completely appeased by the truth and still felt furious towards Berias for keeping the truth from him. However, he got over his anger when Yuri introduced his family in the castle and showed him how much he loves his country.
113	35	"Unkeepable Promise"; Transliteration: "Kanawanu Yakusoku" (Japanese: 叶わぬ約束)	January 15, 2009
Jeneus attacks The Great Demon Kingdom in order to see The Original King once again as his last wish. He sends monsters as decoys to The Great Demon Kingdom and travels over to The Original King's Temple. Upon reaching there, he meets Murata, Shori and Ulrike. Ulrike stops him by casting a barrier around him and The Original King appears, intending to destroy Jeneus with his own hands. He attacks Jeneus and both him and Murata are in pain as they remember the past. Jeneus disappears.
114	36	"True Power"; Transliteration: "Shin no Chikara" (Japanese: 真の力)	January 22, 2009
Yuri invites Alazon to Covenant Castle as an honored guest. He agrees to help Alazon to the exasperation of his subjects. As he is about to take the Holy Sword, Sara snatches it from Alazon, releasing its power and causing plants to erupt around the whole castle. When Yuri tries to stop him, he attacks Yuri. Yuri orders him to stop and drop the sword but Sara, in his fit of anger, vanishes along with sword with Berias grabbing him at the last minute.
115	37	"Sad Yell"; Transliteration: "Nakashiki Houkou" (Japanese: 悲しき咆哮)	January 29, 2009
Sara appears in an alleyway with the Holy Sword lying next to him. When he takes out the sword, it leaves a faint trail on the ground. Sara follows it and finds Jeneus. In vengeance, Sara gives the power of the Holy Sword to Jeneus. Jeneus goes on a rampage and destroys everything in his path. However, when he attacks Sara, Alazon protects him and ended up getting hurt in the process. Sara then realizes that he had been wrong and his mother had rejected him to protect him. Meanwhile, The Great Demon Kingdom battles against Jeneus and his monsters. Yuri then joins the battle and transforms. Murata then arrives along with The Original King.
116	38	"Place to Return to" Transliteration: "Kaeru Basho" (Japanese: 帰る場所)	February 12, 2009
The Original King decides to disappear along with Jeneus but Yuri intervenes. After Yuri had lectured The Original King, they had let down their guard and Jeneus stabs The Original King. Yuri takes over and enters Jeneus' heart, ridding the indecision in it. Light falls from the sky, curing the injured and giving the Holy Sword power, allowing Sara to revive Alazon. Yuri reappears in front of the castle with Jeneus' soul in his hands and passes it over to Murata. Having used up too much power, Yuri loses consciousness.
117	39	"Until the Day We Meet Again"; Transliteration: "MAta Aeru Hi wo" (Japanese: ㋮た会える日を ＜終＞)	February 19, 2009
Everything has turned back to normal but anxiety hangs in the air as Yuri has not awaken. Sara appears, offering to help Yuri with the Holy Sword. Yuri awakens to the delight of everybody. It seems that he had used all his power and had no more Maryoku. Sara had also made the decision to help Alazon when Yuri apologizes for being helpless. After they had left for Seisakoku, Yuri is shocked when he realizes he can not get back to Earth as The Original King had also exhausted his power. Meanwhile, The Ten Nobles gathered together at the castle after hearing the news of Yuri's missing powers. After hearing Yuri's answer they decide to continue supporting him. Later, as Wolfram was chasing him for being disloyal to him, Yuri, Murata and Shori fell into the pond and return to Earth in a bathtub where Yuri realized he still has his powers.
