= List of Kyo Kara Maoh! characters =

The Kyo Kara Maoh! light novel, anime, and manga series features a cast of characters created by Tomo Takabayashi and Temari Matsumoto. The story mainly takes place in an alternate world, in a country called The Great Demon Kingdom (眞魔国, Shin Makoku). Yuri Shibuya, a Japanese high school student from Earth, travels between this other world and Earth by coming in contact with water. On Yuri's first visit to the other world he is informed he is the king of The Great Demon Kingdom.

The Demon Kingdom is split into 11 different sections. One section is ruled over directly by the king and each of the rest are ruled over by one of the ten noble families of The Demon Kingdom (Christ, Voltaire, Grantz, Bielefelt, Karbelnikoff, Wincott, Spitzweg, Gyllenhaal, Rochefort, and Radford). "Von" comes before the surname of anyone who is a member of one of the noble families.

The Original King's era took place 4000 years before the present storyline. Volume 1 was released on December 26, 2005, in Japan.

== Genres ==
Comedy, Fantasy

== Main characters ==
=== Yuri Shibuya ===
The Two Forms of Yuri: Maoh and teenager

Voiced by: Takahiro Sakurai (Japanese); Yuri Lowenthal (English)

Yuri Shibuya (渋谷 有利, Shibuya Yūri) is the protagonist of the story. He was born in the United States and grew up in Saitama, Japan. He is a high school student who enjoys baseball more than textbooks. The kanji Yuri's parents chose for his name Yūri (有利) means profitable, so people make fun of him by saying Shibuya Yūri, Harajuku Furi (渋谷有利原宿不利) (roughly translated meaning "If Shibuya is profitable, then Harajuku is unprofitable"). His mother insists that he is named Yuri because he was born in July and has nothing to do with money or the fact his father is a banker. In the English dub, this became the pun "Yuri is short for urine." He later finds out that Conrad inspired his mother to use the name since while she was in labor, he said that July is called "Yūri" where he comes from.

When Yuri first arrives in The Demon Kingdom, he is told that he is the 27th King of the Demons. Throughout the series, he strives to create a world in which demons and humans can live together in peace, something that progresses slowly but surely as the series goes on.

Yuri easily gets caught up in his emotions, to the point he loses control of himself. He is quick to anger, and cannot stop himself; when he is angry, sad, or feels a strong emotion, his powers emerge. Fans call this condition "Maoh mode" (literally, "Emperor-Mode" (お上様モード, Ouesama mo-do), and as Yuri is a huge fan of Japanese period drama, his speech becomes similar to expressions from that genre. In the novel, there is no note of his appearance changing, while in the manga and anime his eyes become thinner and his hair may grow longer.

At the beginning of the series, Yuri could access his magic only at the height of his emotions. He would usually pass out after using his powers, only to wake up later and not remember what happened. Later on in the series, Yuri learns to control his abilities, summoning powerful magic even in human lands, while most demons can only perform limited magic outside their country. He is unaffected in houseki-filled areas and can wield magic in those spaces, even while full-blooded demons have difficulty standing or breathing. Yuri has a contract with water and uses his magic to alter it into various monster-like forms, notably water dragons. He has also been known to make other messy magical "creatures" from mud, food scraps, etc., much to the horror of the other demons and everyone else.

Due to a misunderstanding, Yuri ends up engaged to Wolfram von Bielefeld on first meeting. Wolfram, angry at the idea that the half-human Yuri is supposedly the king, insults his mother for being human. In anger, Yuri slaps him: the etiquette of the demon nobility dictates that a slap on the left cheek is the way to propose marriage. Wolfram considers this insulting, so he challenges Yuri to a duel by throwing his knife on the floor. Yuri mistakenly picks it up, unaware he accepted Wolfram's challenge again because he is unknowledgeable in the local culture.

It is revealed fairly early in the series that Yuri is the reincarnation of Susanna Julia von Wincott, a blind healer who died in the war against humans 20 prior. Conrad gives Yuri a tear-shaped pendant that used to belong to her. When Yuri first arrives in the Demon Kingdom, Adalbert von Grantz, who was Susanna Julia's fiancé before she died, brought out his stored language memory from his soul so he could understand spoken demon language. While this helps Yuri understand the spoken form, he is still unable to read; he later realizes he can "read" if he runs his fingers over the print, as the blind Susanna Julia read this way (much like Braille in the human world). There is a time in the novels where Julia's consciousness overpowers Yuuri's body, and he temporarily loses his eyesight. Yuri's blood is also one of the keys of the forbidden boxes, another trait he inherited from Susanna Julia. In the anime, Yuri inherits the power to open the box through Christel Wincott, the ancestor of all Demons on Earth, to which he travelled with one of the forbidden boxes to 4,000 years before. This is never mentioned in the original novels.

In the anime, Yuri is called the greatest Demon King after defeating The Originator and freeing The Original King from the dark power. Because of that, Yuri is able to transit between worlds without the help of The Original King.

Mullem Desoive Eligh Morgif (モルギフ, Morugifu)
Voiced by: Takahiro Sakurai (voice altered)
Morgif is the demon sword which can only be wielded by the Demon King. It is a talking sword with the personality of a cheerful, lecherous old man. Murata, who knew the sword when he was the Great Sage, mentions that Morgif had changed much over the years. According to Murata, Morgif once had "a young and handsome face" and a "soothing counter-tenor voice". Morgif originally had a jewel on its 'forehead' that was the source of its power, but it fell out when Cheri dropped the sword while handling it. Yuri then gave the jewel to Josak and said to do whatever he wanted with it.
In the anime, the jewel is eventually replaced in Morgif when Yuri has to fight a powerful Holy Sword. While the jewel is the source of Morgif's true power, Morgif is still formidable without it. The extent of its powers without the jewel are a mystery, and his powers with it are said to be limitless. It is later explained that Erhard Wincott, the ancestor of Susanna Julia von Wincott, was an inventor who tested Morgif and researched its history. Morgif was created from powerful lava streaming from a particular volcano on Van da Via Island. If Morgif is thrown into the lava again, it would assume its original form: a heavily decorated black sword, which Yuri later uses to defeat The Originator.

=== Conrad/Conrart Weller ===
Voiced by: Toshiyuki Morikawa (Japanese); Doug Erholtz (English)

Sir Conrad/Conrart Weller (コンラッド/ウェラー卿コンラート, Konraddo / Werā kyō Konrāto) is the second son of the previous Demon Queen, Cecilie von Spitzweig. His given name is "Conrart", but Yuri calls him "Conrad" since it is closer to English and easier to pronounce. Conrad is only half-demon and because of this, he is unable to wield demon magic. His father was the human Dunheely Weller, famed for his swordsmanship. As his father was not a demon noble, Conrad does not bear "von" (a Germanic nobiliary particle) in his name. Conrad is captain of the Demon Kingdom's army and Yuri's personal bodyguard. When Yuri first arrives in the Demon Kingdom, it is Conrad who finds him and brings him to the castle.

Conrad fought on the front lines for the demons during the war against the humans in order to prove his loyalty to the Demon Kingdom. He and Jozak Gurrier were in an all-half-blood "Lütenburg Platoon", and are famous for being the only two survivors from the Battle of Arnold. Conrad thus gains the moniker "Lion of Lütenburg" from this battle for his heroics and bravery. In the anime, this battle is where Conrad receives his characteristic scar above his right eye.

Conrad and Susanna Julia had a close relationship prior to her death. 17 years before the series' events, after the war had ended, Conrad was put in charge of Susanna Julia's soul at her request, since it was going to be that of the new Demon King. He then took her soul to Earth so that it could be reborn in the body of Yuri.

At one point, Conrad loses his arm in battle, but later appears with a new arm. It is explained in the novels that this "new" arm originally belonged to his ancestor Robert Belal, who was transported to Earth in 1798. When Conrad's arm was cut off, The Original King took the other arm and gave it to Conrad. This arm is the key to the forbidden box named "The End of the Wind".

His ancestor, Lawrence Weller, fought alongside The Original King.

As Conrad stayed on Earth for a time when Yuri was being born, he is knowledgeable of certain Earth tendencies and the culture of Japan. Due to this, he also has an interest in baseball and frequently plays catch with Yuri. He is also known for his horrible puns.

=== Wolfram von Bielefeld ===
Voiced by: Mitsuki Saiga (Japanese); Mona Marshall (English)

Lord Wolfram von Bielefeld (フォンビーレフェルト卿ヴォルフラム, Fon Bīreferuto kyō Vorufuramu) is the youngest son of the former Demon Queen, Cecilie von Spitzweg, and the half-brother of Conrad and Gwendal. He is the only one of the previous queen's three sons who inherited her emerald green eyes and blonde hair, and thus bears a striking resemblance to her. It's also mentioned that he closely resembles The Original King. Celi says he inherited his selfishness from his father, but he can be very manly and reliable. His handsome appearance is so powerful that dying people in the hospital were miraculously healed after laying eyes on him. Wolfram is one of the country's leading practitioners of fire magic (a trait from his mother's side of the family), as well as great swordsmanship. The original author of the light novels, Tomo Takabayashi, has said that Wolfram is her favorite character in the anime version.

He finds himself engaged to Yuri after a misunderstanding. He is extremely upset at first, but the idea quickly grows on him to the point he takes it much more seriously than Yuri does. He follows Yuri practically everywhere so he can keep an eye on him, and even sneaks into Yuri's bedroom at night. He gets extremely jealous when Yuri talks to a girl or good-looking guy, and often accuses him of being unfaithful, a recurring thing used as comic relief.

He initially disliked humans, even Conrad's father, because of his demon pride. He does not like to admit that Conrad is his brother, even though he cares for him. In the novels, it is hinted that this hatred towards humans stems from his late father's own prejudice against humans. His attitude improves throughout the series, progressing to the point he adopts the human girl Greta as his daughter, acknowledges Yuri's parents as his future "in-laws", and runs into a raging fire to save a human child.

A major weakness is that he gets seasick. Yuri also says that Wolfram cannot paint well, even though he insists on it. For example, he tries to paint Yuri, although it turns out unintentionally impressionistic. However, in the novels and manga it is said he could paint very well when he was young when he painted realism, but has decided to change his style to cubism.

Near the end of the second season, there is a time when Wolfram is possessed by The Original King, who in turn was possessed by The Originator. The key he possesses, his heart, is ripped out by The Original King so he can open one of the four forbidden boxes, "Hellfire in Frozen Land". Because of this, Wolfram temporarily dies, and Anissina puts him in a special box to keep him alive. He is revived when The Original King returns the keys to their owners.

His ancestor, Rufus Bielefeld, fought alongside The Original King.

In a story original to the anime at the beginning of season three, Wolfram is chosen by the Ten Noble Families of The Demon Kingdom to become the next Demon King, due to a belief that Yuri would not be able to return to the Demon Kingdom. When Yuri does return, Wolfram's uncle Waltrana pressures Wolfram to seize the throne. Wolfram instead dissolves his engagement with Yuri and flees to his homeland to avoid being used against Yuri. When Yuri hears of Wolfram's predicament, he travels with retainers to Bielefeld lands, in the hopes of persuading Wolfram to return to Covenant Castl – only to be forced into a formal duel by Wolfram himself. In aiming a strong attack at Wolfram, Yuri realizes that Wolfram seems to be readying himself for death, and gives his final words: "Yuri. Be a good king." Seeing that Wolfram had planned the whole thing so Yuri could retake the throne, the latter absorbed the attack himself at the last moment, sparing Wolfram. The Ten Noble Families thus changed their decision to keep Yuri as king, while Waltrana abandons his plan of forcing Wolfram onto the throne. After a reconciliation between the two, Wolfram happily decides to reverse the dissolution of their engagement to a comically shocked Yuri, and proceeds to return to his normal attitude towards their relationship.

=== Gwendal von Voltaire ===
(sometimes translated as von Walde) Voiced by: Akio Ōtsuka (Japanese); Dan Woren (English)

Lord Gwendal von Voltaire (フォンヴォルテール卿グウェンダル, Fon Vorutēru kyō Guwendaru) is the eldest son of Cecilie. He is the current lord of Voltaire. He is a skilled tactician and is capable of using earth magic and can cast barriers. Gwendal is a tough guy except when it comes to his childhood friend, Anissina, and his brothers. He is afraid of Anissina and often hides from her so he can prevent being used in one of her crazy experiments. He is even seen sweating in panic at the thought of her. While he does not outwardly show much affection towards his brothers, he shows in times of great stress that he does care. When not otherwise busy, Gwendal indulges in his hobby of knitting but often his creatures look nothing like what they're supposed to (for example a bear got mistaken for a black pig or a cat that looks like a raccoon). He is adamant that knitting helps him sharpen his concentration but actually, it's been a stress reliever for him since childhood. He is also quite fond of cute animals or cute objects such as the dolphin key chain (Bandou-kun) Yuri received at the dolphin show and later gave to him. His childhood best friend is Anissina von Karbelnikoff, an inventor who often tests out her inventions on him, much to his displeasure. Anissina is also the one who taught Gwendal how to knit. Gwendal's left eye is a key to one of the four Forbidden Boxes, the "End of the Earth".

When he and Yuri were alone in the desert following a sand trap that sucked in Wolfram and Conrad, Gwendal showed certain care towards Yuri and smiled. Yuri later commented to Conrad that the siblings have similar smiles, even though Gwendal's is covered up by his "scary face". He is the commander of the demon army and often comes with reinforcements when Yuri finds himself in big trouble. He is also the one who does the paperwork and essentially runs the kingdom for Yuri. Often enough, when Yuri leaves the castle, Gunter is seen barging into Gwendal's office, demanding where Yuri is. Gwendal would usually look tired and suggest an idea that sounds appealing to Gunter, for example locking Yuri up in a room where no one will interfere.

When he was younger, Gwendal despised humans, a habit called the Demon Pride by Dunheely Weller. On Dunheely's last journey to a nameless village, he told Gwendal to enjoy the ride before their last duel. Upon arriving in the village, Gwendal is shocked that the village is not recognized by The Demon Kingdom, and leads the attack on the bandits which targeted the village. In this duel, Gwendal sees Dunheely for who he really was, an old man, not the agile man he knew when he was younger. Dunheely later dies of old age, and Gwendal buries him near the tree where Dunheely told Gwendal what he was looking for. Years later while on a picnic with his family and Yuri, Gwendal admits that Dunheely was a larger existence than anyone else within him because he hated that man.

Gwendal has no interest in love affairs and even points out that issues coming from love affairs are beyond his ability to influence. He does occasionally show care towards Greta, often being in charge of her while Yuri and Wolfram are in one of their adventures. Gwendal knows how to bake, as he does so for Greta when Günter, who would usually bake cookies for Greta, leaves the castle for a short journey. Greta comments that Gwendal's cookies look cute while Yuri comments Gwendal is good at baking as Gwendal's cookies are made into animal shapes, similar to the ones he knits.

His ancestor, Siegbert Voltaire, fought alongside The Original King.

=== Günter von Christ/von Kleist ===
Voiced by: Kazuhiko Inoue (Japanese); Sam Riegel (English)

Lord Günter von Christ (フォンクライスト卿ギュンター, Fon Kuraisuto kyō Gyuntā) is Yuri's adviser and teacher. Günter is a skilled swordsman and magician. He is an odd mixture of manly fighting skills and a stereotypically feminine personality, and as such is a comic presence in most episodes. In the light novels, he is discovered to be of the People of Lake Shore. He describes them as such: "There are many among them who are born with strong magical powers, and they act as teachers and guards here in the capital." They are identified by their purple-colored hair or eyes.

Very whimsical and poetic in his thoughts, he is Anissina's number 2 test subject. He has an extremely strong attachment to Yuri and tends to pine for Yuri when he is absent from the Demon Kingdom. 20 years prior to the story, he was an instructor at a military academy.

When shot with a poisoned arrow containing the Wincott Poison, Günter's soul was temporarily housed in an Okiku Doll that flies, shoots lasers from its eyes, and has hair that grows naturally. He referred to his temporary body as "Snow Günter" and it could be controlled by or released from the effects of the Wincott Poison by any one of the direct line of the von Wincotts like Susanna Julia's father and nephew.

When Günter accidentally travels to Earth, he briefly becomes a model in New York City so that he can earn money to find Yuri. He is very popular among both females and males because of his good looks.

Günter's only family seems to be his adopted daughter, Gisela.

=== Ken Murata ===
Voiced by: Kouki Miyata (Japanese); Grant George (English)

Some of the main characters in Kyo Kara Maoh!, left to right: Conrad Weller, Gwendal von Voltaire, Günter von Christ, Wolfram Bielefeld, and Yuri Shibuya.

Ken Murata (村田健, Murata Ken) was born in Hong Kong and raised in Japan. Murata met Yuri in middle school, where they were in the same class for two years. He now goes to a famous private school. Yuri states that his name is similar to his favorite historical drama actor Matsudaira Ken, so he is the only one of Yuri's former classmates that he actually remembers the name and face of, other than baseball club members. Murata is known to smile often and keep relatively quiet, except when he often tells jokes which do not suit his age.

He is the reincarnation of the Great Sage, the "double black" tactician and strategist to the Original King of The Demon Kingdom. He remembers the previous lives he has had over the past 4,000 years. As a child, he had great difficulty discerning his past lives from the present one, and so he had to take special lessons with José Rodríguez on how to keep those separate from his present self. Because of his past lives, he is able to speak many languages such as that of the Demon Kingdom, English and French. His parents are always busy with work, so he is often home alone. He also spends a lot of time with Yuri's family. Since Yuri saved him from getting mugged, they have become very close. Murata is now the co-owner and manager of Yuri's grass lot baseball team in the novels.

In Murata's most recent life, he was an adult film actress named "Christine" who lived in Hong Kong. Before that, he was a French doctor named Henri Régent who appeared in the extra story novel "Ojōsama to wa Kari no Sugata!" Murata's other past lives include a Spanish baker, a Venetian bakery worker, an Ancient Egyptian embalmer who made mummies, and a knight in the Crusades.

In the novels, 4,000 years before when The Originator was sealed in the boxes, they immediately took two of these to Earth and he was reincarnated there. In the anime, it seems like he and The Original King were closer and around 2,000 years ago, he was reincarnated as Jeneus and formed an organization in The Original King's memory called the White Crows.

It was established in a drama CD that he placed second nationwide in the entrance exams for the University of Tokyo. Also, even though he is still a high school student, he is already developing software and trading stocks.

Dr. José Rodríguez was responsible for handling his soul, around the time Conrad transported Susanna Julia's soul to Earth.

== Supporting characters ==
=== Three Great Witches of The Demon Kingdom ===
Cecilie von Spitzweg

Voiced by: Masako Katsuki (Japanese); Karen Strassman (English)

Cecilie von Spitzweg (フォンシュピッツヴェーグ卿ツェツィーリエ, Fon Shupittsuvēgu kyō Tsetsīrie) was the 26th Demon Queen and the mother of Wolfram, Conrad and Gwendal, each with different fathers. One of the three great witches of The Demon Kingdom. Commonly known as "Golden Celi." She can use fire magic. Although initially, Cecilie seems to be rather airheaded, she is actually very astute and intelligent and a very caring person. Having been replaced as the Demon King by Yuri, Cecilie takes advantage of her open schedule to hunt for men on a "free and easy quest for love." Cecilie is also quite powerful, and has admirable skill with a whip. When fighting she dresses in red leather and mask. This form and her skill tends to scare her enemies, and if they ever meet her the second time, they are usually unwilling to fight her again.

Cecilie likes flowers and grows new types of them in the Covenant Castle. She also names them, examples being "Beautiful Wolfram（麗しのヴォルフラム）", "Secret Gwendal（内緒のグウェンダル）", "Conrad Stands Upon the Earth（大地立つコンラート）", and "Celi's Red Sigh（ツェリの桃色吐息）", and also, in season 3 she makes a new one which she called "Filled with Yuri's Naivete".

She can take control of situations easily and effectively, however, and cares for her sons deeply. When Wolfram temporarily dies, she is devastated and throughout the series she can be seen doing her best to protect her sons without directly interfering.

Anissina von Karbelnikoff

Voiced by: Minami Takayama (Japanese); Michelle Ruff (English)

Anissina von Karbelnikoff (フォンカーベルニコフ卿アニシナ, Fon Kāberunikofu kyō Anishina) is one of the three great witches of The Demon Kingdom. Commonly known as Red Anissina. Self-titled poison woman. She has red hair and blue eyes. Anissina is an inventor and is also Gwendal's childhood friend. She often uses him to test out her inventions and it is for this reason that Gwendal seems to fear Anissina. When Gwendal is not around, Günter becomes her test subject. She is also the one who taught Gwendal how to knit and later Greta too. She is afraid of roosters.

Aside from her inventions, she spends her time writing adventure story books involving herself as a super-heroine figure.

She belongs to one of the 10 noble families of the kingdom and her brother Densham rules their area.

Susannah Julia von Wincott

Voiced by: Risa Mizuno (Japanese); Joan-Carol O'Connell (English)

Susannah Julia von Wincott (フォンウィンコット卿スザナ・ジュリア, Fon Winkotto kyō Suzana Juria) was one of the three great witches of The Demon Kingdom. Commonly known as white Julia. She was engaged to Adalbert. She was a tomboy who was a top class martial artist. She was also incredibly skilled at medical magic. During the war since she wanted to help so many people she over spent her magic, which resulted in her death. Gisela was one who remained by Julia's side during the latter's final moments. She was very close to Conrad, and she gave him her pendant, which Conrad then gave to Yuri.

In the anime, she was Wolfram's teacher. She met her future self, Yuri, just before the Lutenburg Division left for the battlefield. Her chance meeting with Yuri prodded her that she is making the right choice accepting her fate to be the soul of the next Demon King and that Yuri will heal the world in the future. Her ancestor, Erhard Wincott, was one of the chosen that was entrusted with one of the Four Forbidden boxes, "The Mirror at the Bottom of the Sea". The younger brother, Christel Wincott, brought the box to Earth for safe keeping. Julia's blood is the key to the box, and Yuri inherited this trait of being a key from her. When Yuri's body is taken over by The Original King, whose soul is taken over by The Originator, she saves Yuri by letting him remember that he has courage to fight and change the world.

=== Demon Kingdom ===
Stoffel von Spitzweg

Voiced by: Unshou Ishizuka (Japanese); Terrence Stone (English)

Stoffel von Spitzweg (フォンシュピッツヴェーグ卿シュトッフェル, Fon Shupittsuvēgu kyō Shutofferu) is Cecilie's older brother. He was the regent of the former Demon Queen. Since he dislikes humans he started the war between the humans and the demons. His own nephews do not trust him, as he was responsible for the last war against the humans. He tries to get close to Yuri but fails.

In the anime, Stoffel tried to regain his authority by kidnapping Yuri and trying to convince him that his three nephews were just using him to control The Demon Kingdom. This action almost resulted in a civil war with his nephews when they tried to rescue Yuri. Luckily, with Yosak's help Yuri escaped and prevented war from breaking out. Yuri made Stoffel's punishment, for waging war, house arrest in his own castle and lands. Later, he tries to win back Yuri's trust by celebrating Yuri's visit, though the plan backfires when his sister returns instead. By the end of the anime, he has given up his power struggles, and instead becomes a faithful noble willing to fight and protect the Demon King against The Originator's armies.

Lord Gegenhuber "Hube" Griesela

Voiced by: Hiroaki Hirata (Japanese); Richard Cansino (English)

Lord Gegenhuber Griesela (グリーセラ卿ゲーゲンヒューバー, Gurīsera kyō Gēgenhyūbā) is Gwendal's cousin from his father's side. Years ago, Hube's bigotry and ambition led to many deaths forcing Gwendal to banish Hube from the Demon Kingdom under the guise of searching for a lost artifact, the Demon Flute. Twenty years later, Yuri learns of Hube in Conansia Svelera (Suberera) from the human woman, Nicola, who is bearing Hube's child. Yuri struggles to learn details about Hube's past but no one wants to talk about the acts that were so terrible, even Conrad is content to watch him die. Hube becomes the bodyguard for a corrupt lord who swindles people into gambling and taking their shop deeds. When Yuri eventually discovers the truth, he forgave Hube for unintentionally trying to kill him, and begs Gwendel not to kill Hube. Gwendal eventually agrees not to, and Hube leaves for his own castle, but not before he tells Gwendal about a box he saw in Suberera. The incident left Hube without his left eye, indicating this box was one of the Four Forbidden Boxes.

In the anime, Hube swore loyalty to Yuri because Yuri chose to spare his life despite Hube's crime. As such, Hube would go to extreme lengths to protect Yuri, such as leaving Nicola to fight against the possessed Original King.

Yozak Gurrier

Voiced by: Masanori Takeda (Japanese); Marvin Lee (English)

Yozak Gurrier (グリエ・ヨザック, Guriē Yozakku) is a spy for The Demon Kingdom. He was born in Big Cimarron. He was born from a traveling demon and a human prostitute. His mother abandoned him at a young age and he was taken in by a local church. He inherited his orange hair and blue eyes from his father. Yozak and Conrad have been forced acquaintances since they were children. Yozak and Conrad are the only survivors of the Lütenburg platoon, a special division of The Demon Kingdom army created by Stoffel made completely of half-blood troops, who returned from the Battle of Arnold,

He is a kind-hearted man despite his huge appearance, and no matter how masculine he looks, enjoys cross-dressing and frequently dresses as a woman in his work as a spy. He says he carries a dress around as a good-luck charm because dressing as a female has saved his life many times.

He originally doubted Yuri, but Yuri eventually gains his trust by entrusting him with the jewel from Morgif's forehead.

Greta

Voiced by: Motoko Kumai (Japanese); Rebecca Forstadt (English)

Greta (グレタ, gureta) is the adopted human daughter of Yuri Shibuya and Wolfram von Bielefelt. She is a princess of the fallen kingdom of Zorashia. Before the kingdom fell her mother, Izura, sent Greta to her homeland (Svelera) as a hostage. Since it was going badly with her adopted parents she plotted to kill Yuri. At first Greta tried to kill Yuri by posing as his illegitimate daughter because her uncaring foster parents hated the Demon King and she believed she could earn their love by assassinating him. Not long after that Yuri forgives and adopts her. Wolfram follows suit, reasoning that as Yuri's fiancé he is also Greta's parent. In the novels she is currently studying abroad in Cavalcade.

Greta met and befriended Hube while he was imprisoned in her adoptive parent's castle and later helped him to escape.

Adalbert von Grantz

Voiced by: Masaki Terasoma (Japanese); Kirk Thornton (English)

Adalbert von Grantz (フォングランツ・アーダルベルト, Fon Gurantsu Ādaruberuto) is Julia's former fiance. He's from one of the 10 noble families but because of a personal grudge he hates demons. He refuses demon magic and learns how to use houjutsu. Adalbert is the first important character that Yuri meets in The Demon Kingdom.

Gisela von Christ

Voiced by: Hiroko Taguchi (Japanese); Karen Strassman (English)

Gisela von Christ is the adopted daughter of Günter. In the novels she has dark brown hair. She is a member of the healer tribe so she has green eyes and her blood is green so her skin is a bit of a different color. She is usually sweet and caring, but is strict and commanding when it comes to work. Her attitude toward work and her ability to order people around earned her the nickname "Sergeant" even though she's only an officer. Her 'Sergeant mode' have earned her respect and fear from Dakoskos, Keenan, Wolfram and others. A military physician, she was Julia's aid during the war so she cared for her and cremated her body when she died.

Dakoskos

Voiced by: Takashi Matsuyama (Japanese); Eddie Frierson (English)

Dakoskos (リリット・ラッチー・ナナダン・ミコダン・ダカスコス, Riritto Racchī Nanadan Mikodan Dakosukosu) is one of the men-at-arms of Covenant Castle, Dakoskos sacrificed his hair for one of Günter's schemes but ultimately remains a loyal subject - even as he's often the source of comic relief. Dakoskos often becomes emotional over good food.

In the anime, Dakoskos travels to Vandavia Island with Günter to help Morgif regain its original form.

Ulrike (ウルリーケ)

Voiced by: Yukana Nogami (Japanese); Lara Cody (English) Ulrike (ウルリーケ, Ururīke)

With the exception of the Great Sage, she is the only one with the gift of being able to hear The Original King's words. Though she looks like a young girl she is 800 years old. Ulrike comes from a long line of priestesses each chosen by The Original King to act as a channel between him and the people of The Demon Kingdom.

In the Anime, She succeeds Ondine, whose final assignment after retirement was to get Yuri to form a pact with the elements. Ulrike is the one who, at the order of and with additional powers from The Original King, transports Yuri to and from his world to The Demon Kingdom. Just like the other priestesses, she is not permitted to leave The Original King's temple. Yuri, however, once tried to take her out to show her the beautiful world outside, but Wolfram barged in thinking he was flirting with her. At one point in the anime, her "childhood spirit" escaped from her body and went outside to play. Her skills frightened the other children and caused chaos in the village. Ulrike chased after her younger form, and revealed her ability to take on the form of a young woman (as opposed to her current childlike one) to "comfort" her younger self.

Densham von Karbelnikoff (フォンカーベルニコフ卿デンシャム, Fon Kāberunikofu kyō Denshamu)

Voiced by: Hikaru Midorikawa

Anissina's older brother. The current ruler of Karbelnikoff. He has red hair and blue eyes. He really loves money and birds. He has many birds and chickens. He tried to marry his sister off for money until Gwendal intervened.

Dunheely Weller

Voiced by: Kenyuu Horiuchi (Japanese); Kirk Thornton (English)

Dunheely Weller was Cecelie's second husband and Conrad's father. At his time of death he was 89 years old. On his left arm he has a tattoo marking him as the last descendant of the exiled three continent royal family(大陸三王家). Despite resistance, he married Cecelie and had a son – Conrart. Celi herself admitted that their wedding was approved by The Original King. In his youth, Dunheely took Conrad on trips with him to the human lands. Dunheely championed the rights of half-human, half-demon and spent decades in making their lives better. It is known later on that an ancestor of the Weller family was entrusted with the key (left arm) for one of the Forbidden boxes. Dunheely Weller kept the family secret and became a wandering swordsman of amazing prowess.

In the Anime, Dunheely wanted proof of his life. Gwendal detested him, having the pride of a demon, as Dunheely stated. However, after taking Gwendal along for a trip to settle their duel, Gwendal changes his opinions of Dunheely. While appearing young to Gwendals' eyes, Dunheely was actually an old man by the time he and Gwendal fought off bandits to keep the Nameless Village safe.

Effe

Voiced by: Michi Niino

Effe (エーフェ, Ēfe) is a Chef. She is friends with Conrad. She has a lover who is in the guard. She has a younger brother. In the novels she is there from the beginning but in the anime they introduce her as a new maid in the third season.

The Original King

Voiced by: Shin-ichiro Miki

The Original King (眞王, Shin'ou; True King)is the first King of The Demon Kingdom. His soul watches over the lands of The Demon Kingdom, and priestess such as Ulrike and Ondine can communicate with him in a limited fashion, one they call "hearing His Majesty's voice". Murata also appears to be able to communicate with him, and is often seen scolding him for meddling in The Demon Kingdom's affairs.

4000 years ago, The Original King sealed The Originator into four boxes, which became known as the "Four Forbidden Boxes". However, while part of The Originator was sealed in the boxes, a small part of The Originator infected The Original King to the extent where his right arm seemed slightly decayed. The Original King knew that The Originator would eventually take over his mind and body completely, so The Original King came up with a plan along with his Great Sage to completely eradicate The Originator in the future. This involved sealing The Originator with a pure soul, and then destroying it. This soul turned out to be The Original King, but Yuri manages to eradicate The Originator without harming The Original King, earning Yuri the title of the greatest Demon King. The Original King commented that he was glad he chose Yuri as the Demon King.

The Original King appears to be well alive in the OVAs, having seemed to regain a physical body unlike his soul form at the end of Season 2.

The Original King told Yuri that with The Originator destroyed, his aim of choosing Yuri as the Demon King has been reached, and Yuri no longer needed to be the Demon King. Since Yuri can achieve his goal very well, The Original King said that he will not hold back the decision of choosing Yuri as the Demon King and blesses him. The Original King has stated he will reduce anyone who opposes Yuri as the Demon King to ash.

The Double Black Great Sage (双黒の大賢者)

Voiced by: Nozomu Sasaki

By The Original King's order he reincarnates while keeping memories from his previous lives. He inherited his black hair and eyes from his mother and he is the reason that double blacks are so highly regarded in The Demon Kingdom.

In the novel "Shin MA Koku Yori Ai wo Komete" it is revealed that he is actually The Original King's brother from another mother. He was sent to kill The Original King but on the way to do so he hit his head and lost his memories and so The Original King manages to convince him to help him.

=== Human Lands ===
Nicola

Voiced by: Yuki Masuda (Japanese); Philece Sampler (English)

Nicola (ニコラ, Nikola) first met Yuri and Gwendel at her "wedding" where she escaped after hearing Yuri's speech about gloves and mates. She was delighted to learn that her rescuers include her lover Hube's cousin. She was the one to change Hube's views about humans. The couple fell in love and she was already pregnant by Gegenhuber "Hube" Grisela when she met Yuri. Nicola kept half of the Demon Flute which she gave to Yuri and got mistaken as Yuri by Conrad.

In the anime, She has the baby which she names El (which is short for Ernst(エルンスト)). In the anime episode 101 Nicola states that El is their eldest son (長男), and it is also said in a character design book that he is a boy.

Lady Flynn Gilbit

Voiced by: Yoshino Takamori
Lady Flynn Gilbit (フリン・ギルビット, Furin Girubitto) assumed the role of her husband Lord Norman Gilbit to protect her small country, Caloria, and its lands after his death. She chose to wear a mask and pretend to be her husband because if she did not Small Cimaron would take over the land and Caloria would no longer exist since under their laws, women cannot inherit lands or titles, and adoptions are only valid before the death of the current ruler. Upon discovering that Big Cimaron has one of the Forbidden boxes ("The End of the Wind"), she assists Yuri and his group in retrieving it.

Nigel Weiz Maxine

Voiced by: Mugihito
Nigel Weiz Maxine (ナイジェル・ワイズ・マキシーン, Naijeru Waizu Makushīn) is a soldier of Small Cimaron. King Saralegi's faithful servant. Because of his hair style Yuri calls him Cropped-Pony. He accidentally falls under a spell which makes him believe that Adalbert is his father.

In the anime, Lord Maxine and Adalbert von Grantz encounter Yuri in Caloria during Maxine's attempt to bully Lord Gilbert around.

Saralegi

Voiced by: Akira Ishida
Saralegi (サラレギー) is the King of Small Cimaron. He is 17 years old. He has golden eyes and white gold hair. Rather than just Small Cimaron he wants to rule the world. He can see well in the dark but this makes him sensitive to light so he wears sunglasses most of the time. He is a child between his mother Alazon the former empress of Seisunakoku and The former king of Small Cimaron Gilbert. He has a twin brother Yelshi. He thought that since it appeared he did not have Houryoku his mother gave him to his father to raise in Small Cimaron but he later finds out that he was stillborn when he was born and his mother used one of the forbidden boxes to bring him back to life (though it's unknown if it actually had any effect) so his mother sent him away so he would not be near the box anymore.

In the Anime, he has the power of hypnosis, which he tried to use on Yuri, but with no effect.

=== Earth ===
Shori Shibuya

Voiced by: Katsuyuki Konishi (Japanese); D.C. Douglas (1st), Patrick Seitz (2nd) (English)
Shori Shibuya (渋谷勝利, Shibuya Shōri) is Yuri's older brother who goes to Hitotsubashi University. He likes to play dating simulators and is very protective of Yuri. He is Bob's successor to be the Demon King of Earth. When he was younger, he met Bob who rescued Yuri and him from bullies. While initially despising his parents for having an argument, he also resented the fact that Yuri will have to go to The Demon Kingdom eventually. Bob explained to him that that would happen in the future, and so Shori was contented being with Yuri for the time being. Shori communicates regularly with Bob, who he complains emphasizes his age more than anything else. His short term ambition is to become the governor of Tokyo.

Often carrying a cold attitude, he did not welcome having Wolfram and the others in his house. He seems especially distasteful to Conrad, and makes a point of demanding that Conrad returns his clothes to him properly cleaned (since the two of them are about the same build and size, Jennifer usually lends Shori's clothing to Conrad). Later, he and Conrad form an understanding based on their mutual desire to protect Yuri.

In the anime, Once Shori ends up in The Demon Kingdom, he becomes suspicious of The Original King, Murata, and the four forbidden boxes. Shori eventually goes to The Demon Kingdom where he learns to use the powerful magic he possesses. Wolfram gave Shori a pact to the elements, somewhat like how Odine gave a pact to Yuri to gain control of his magic. Shori's magic is like of Yuri's, the control of water, but initially Shori's magic takes the form of a giant hand. He is, however, seen to be able to shape his magic into water dragons after training with Ulrike, who comments that Shori is extraordinary because he learned to control his magic slightly in a short span of time.

Miko Shibuya

Voiced by: Yumi Kakazu (Japanese); Dorothy Elias-Fahn (English)
Miko Shibuya (渋谷美子, Shibuya Miko) is Yuri and Shori's human mother. During her school days, she was a fencer and was known as Jennifer of Yokohama. She went to Ferris University. She has known about Yuri becoming Demon King since before Yuri was born but did not tell him. She is very energetic, loves fantasy and has a big imagination. Miko had always wanted to have a baby girl, so when Yuri was young she let his hair grow long and dressed him in girls' clothes. Miko often gives strange advice to Yuri, and in some situations it really helps Yuri out. She likes to be called "Mama" instead of "Mom" or "Mother" by her sons. The only ones who actually call her "Mama" are not her sons, but Murata and Wolfram.

Shoma Shibuya

Voiced by: Kōji Tsujitani (Japanese); Joe Cappelletti (English)
Shoma Shibuya (渋谷勝馬, Shibuya Shōma) is the father of Yuri and Shori. He is an Earth born demon. He is well known in the banking world as "the demon king of banking". He originally knew about Yuri becoming Demon King when he met with Conrad shortly after Conrad came to Earth. Shoma was originally angered by Conrad's cold attitude, and told him to never let his son or wife see that unsmiling face. Conrad takes those words to heart, and later grows to become the 'smiling godfather' Yuri often sees. Shoma is much more soft-spoken than his wife, and a fan of the Boston Red Sox.

Bob

Voiced by: Takaya Hashi (Japanese); Steve Kramer (English)
Bob is an Earth born demon who is the Demon King of Earth. He is a financial investor who is called "the Demon King of the financial world". Yuri's mother always refers to him as "That demon who looks like a movie star" (Robert De Niro). He met Yuri and Shori when they were children and saved them from bullies.

In the anime it is said that he is a direct descendant of Christel Wincott (and that all Earth demons are related to him). Christel Wincott brought "Mirror's depth" from The Demon Kingdom to Earth. Bob was the keeper of the box, before he entrusted it to Yuri, who took it back with him to The Demon Kingdom.

Jose Rodriguez

Voiced by: Keiji Fujiwara
Jose Rodriguez (ホセ・ロドリゲス, Hose Rodorigesu) is an associate of the Demon King of Earth and also a friend of Conrad. Dr. Rodriguez is a pediatrician who loves Japanese anime and often travels to Akihabara to buy Gundam models. It seems he was close Christine and so he took care of her spirit after she died which was then born as Ken Murata. He became Murata's pediatrician when Ken was younger and began to remember his previous lives. Later on he is seen working for the Demon King of Earth.

=== Others ===
The Originator

The Originator according to Murata, is a formless being which is composed of the negative emotions of humanity. Due to its state, it can easily enter the hearts of people who have negative feelings. When the people of The Demon Kingdom began to rebel against The Original King, The Originator further infected The Original King due to his frustration with his people.

The Great Sage and The Original King came up with a plan to completely eradicate The Originator. This involved sealing The Originator with a pure soul, and then destroying it. This soul turned out to be The Original King, whose soul was sealed with The Originator into the Four Forbidden Boxes. The pair decided the Great Sage would be reincarnated so he could find and assist the person who would finally be able to destroy The Originator completely. The Originator (using The Original King's memories) tells Yuri that The Original King and the Great Sage intended that person to be Julia von Wincott, but she was, ironically, too pure for The Originator to possess. Yuri became the last, best hope for victory. With the help of Morgif in its original form, Yuri managed to destroy The Originator without harming The Original King. Yuri inherits The Original King's power, which earns him the title of the greatest Demon King.

The Originator's shadow was a tall gigantic masked figure which possessed Belar for a short time. When Yuri breaks the control spell on Josak, Adalbert and Keenan, the shadow of The Originator disappears, but not before it possessed Wolfram. When The Originator possessed Wolfram, Wolfram was forced to disrupt the sealing ceremony, and stay still while the key, Wolfram's heart, was ripped out by the form of The Original King.

== Characters from Novels and Drama CDs ==
Yelshi

- Drama CD voice: Yuki Kaida

Yelshi (イェルシー, Yerushī) is the emperor of Seisunakoku and Sararegi's twin brother. He has very powerful houryoku which he can use to translate foreign languages and to manipulate the dead. He pretends to be an obedient younger brother but he is just as ambitious as his brother. He has a mother complex.

Venera

- Drama CD voice: Hisako Kyouda

Venera (ベネラ, Benera) is the leader of the Seisunakoku slaves. It is revealed that she is actually Hazel Graves. One day in 1936 was pulled to the other world by the box's power. She is April Graves's grandmother.

Abigale Graves

- Drama CD voice: Houko Kuwashima

Abigale Graves (アビゲイル・グレイブス, Abigeiru Gureibusu) is April's great-grandchild. When she came to visit Bob in Japan she incidentally ran into Shori at the airport, after that they work together to search for the forbidden box mirrors depth. She speaks German and Japanese. She looks a lot like her great-grandmother. Her mother is Crystal.

Alazon

- Drama CD voice: Sumi Shimamoto

Alazon (アラゾン, Arazon) is the former empress of Seisunakoku. She is Sararegi and Yelshi's mother. Since Sararegi was stillborn she attempted to use the forbidden boxes to revive him and sent him to live with his father so he would be away from the box.

In the third season of the anime she is the leader of the "white crows" and kidnaps Shori.

Characters from the extra story novel 'Ojousama towa kari no sugata!'
April Graves

April Graves (エイプリル・グレイブス, Eipuriru Gureibusu) is an American business man's daughter. Born in 1920. 18 years old. She has dark brown hair and blue grey eyes. She is her grandmother's successor in the treasure hunter business and inherited the box "mirror depth". Later she marries Richard and their grandchild(Crystal) succeeds her.

Richard Dueter

Richard Dueter (リヒャルト・デューター, Rihyaruto Dūtā) is a young German SS officer. Born in 1911. 27 years old. He has brown hair and light brown eyes with specks of silver. He has the arm of an ancestor who died 100 years ago that had not rotted at all. He's the descendant of Robert Belal (ローバルト･ベラール, Rōbaruto Berāru) (Conrad's distant relative) who when Cimaron was destroyed he threw himself into the lake and came out in 1798 Earth. Since he has the key to "wind's end", He is forced to be one of Hitler's bodyguards. After the war he flees to America and marries April.

Henry Régent

Henry Régent (アンリ・レジャン, Anri Rejan) is a French doctor. He appears to be over 40. He is one of Murata's past lives.

== Anime Original Characters ==
Raven

Voiced by: Yasunori Matsumoto (Japanese); Doug Stone (English)
Raven (レイヴン) is a childhood friend of Celi and Stoffel. He advises Lord Stoffel and executes orders on the ex-Regent's behalf. Raven's strategies and ruthlessness endanger Yuri, however, in his heart Raven is more loving than malicious. Has a niece named Elizabeth.

Elizabeth

Voiced by: Fumiko Orikasa
Raven's niece. She claims she was engaged to Wolfram when they were children. When they were children, Wolfram accidentally slapped Elizabeth, on her left cheek. Elizabeth never forgot this incident, insisting that they swore everlasting love that day, while Wolfram insists he forgot why he slapped her in the first place. Elizabeth becomes Stoffel's tool to separate Yuri from the three brothers, pronouncing an engagement proposal to Yuri. Elizabeth's real goal is to marry Wolfram, but Wolfram says that his only fiance is Yuri. During the duel which ensues, (as Yuri accidentally picked up a knife and a fork pointing; symbolizing a duel to settle a love triangle), Yuri uses his magic to protect Wolfram from being hurt by fire magic that Elizabeth summoned. He proclaims that the two go on the date to remember their childhood memories. It is eventually learned that Wolfram slapped Elizabeth because he wanted to touch a butterfly that flew past, and Conrad was watching the entire event. He claimed he forgotten about it because he did not want to embarrass Elizabeth.

Alford Markina

Voiced by: Kentarou Itou (Japanese); Eddie Frierson (English)
Alford Markina (アルフォード・マキナー) is a human swordsman who owns a holy sword. He was originally an enemy of Yuri as the group he was travelling with misled him into thinking a dragon heart could cure any disease. He joins the side of the mazoku when he finds out the truth and sees how kind Yuri is. He says Conrad beat his father in a dual years ago and so he challenges Conrad to a duel.

King Belar

Voiced by: Kazuhiro Nakata
The power-hungry monarch of Big Cimaron knows no limitations to his ambitions of or the measures he will take to achieve them. However, his lust for power, Belar's cowardice undermines his chances for success. Belar is possessed by The Originator for a time. He was forced to abdicate and was replaced by Lanzhil the Second.

Jeneus

Voiced by: Nozomu Sasaki
Alazon's subordinate, and a clone of an incarnation of the Great Sage who lived in Cimaron two thousand years ago. The cloning process that created him is unstable, and he needs Alazon's houryoku to survive. In return, he assists her in her search for Seisakoku's holy sword, but his truest wish is to return to the Great Demon Kingdom and speak to the Original King one last time. He is nearly identical in appearance to the Great Sage's first incarnation of four thousand years ago.

Berius

Alazon's younger brother, and Saralegi's uncle, although Saralegi is initially unaware of their relationship. He is a pure-blooded Shinzoku, but disguises himself as a human. He acts as Saralegi's bodyguard and most trusted advisor, and is a swordsman whose skills approach those of Conrad Weller.

== Creatures ==
T-zou

T-zou is a sheep who has a birthmark on his face that resembles a "T," hence the name "T-zou."

He was first seen in Season 1, Episode 29. He has taken a liking to the Maou, but the opposite is apparent for the Great Wise Man. The reason for this is unexplained. However, when the Great Wise Man tried to be friends with him, he tried to feed him a manjuu. Yozak explained that the sheep in that region were terrified of manjuus. He further stated that when sheep eat a manjuu, a miracle would evidently occur. Yuri "destroyed" the manjuu by eating it, which made T-zou like him more.

In episode 33, Maxine of Small Cimaron tried to exploit the fact that it was deathly afraid of manjuus by scaring him in order to cheat off the race that Yuri and Yozak were trying to win. However, when on the verge falling over a cliff, Yuri took it upon himself to force T-zou to eat the manjuu. It was a good call, as T-zou was able to fly and take them to safety.

He was left in Caloria and never appeared in the subsequent episodes.

Bear Bees

Bear bees are an endangered species. They have a bee's body as an abdomen and bee antennae. However, their heads seem to be that of a bear as well as their arms and legs. Their cry is the nonsensical, "Nogisu".

The first sighting of these rare creatures was in Episode 18, where Yuri and Wolfram ended up in the guest wing of Blood Pledge Castle in order to exterminate the "monsters" who were apparently inhabiting the place. After Yuri and Wolfram saw to it that the Bear Bees hatched from their cocoons, the creatures mistook them as their parents.

Apparently, Wolfram's paint was extracted from the excrement of these creatures. However, once they saved the Bear Bees, he took it upon himself not to use them.

Another species of Bear Bees exist: the Pink Bear Bees. In the fourth OVA, it was found while fixing the new residence of the Maou. It was supposed to be a "sacrifice" for the dragons when they were in a maddened state and were unable to control their actions in the "Dragon Rebellion". Through a number of circumstances, however, this did not push through and they were able to survive without being sacrificed.

Dragons

Dragons are also an endangered species that exist in the Great Demon Kingdom. Their appearances vary as there are some with green, brown and blue skin, to name a few. They are protected from poachers in a special region in the kingdom, fortified by the demons, headed by Gunter von Christ.

The only named dragon in the series is Pochi, named by the Maou, Yuri Shibuya. However, Wolfram insists on a more ethereal name, Rhys-Er or Lizel, in other translations. He first appears in Season 1, Episode 19, when he was still a hatchling dragon. He appears again in Season 2, Episode 43 when baby Ernst, with his amplified powers from Lady Annissinna's inventions, summons him. At first, Yuri and Wolfram do not recognize him. But after Conrad explains that the dragon that appeared is much too small and cannot be an adult, it was clear that he is, in fact, Pochi.

He appears again in the fourth OVA, where he leads a flock of dragons to find the Pink Bear Bee in their maddened state in the "Dragon Rebellion" in order to kill it. However, he regains he consciousness back and he soon greets Yuri and Wolfram before departing once again.

He never appears in the anime again.

Kotsuhizoku

Kotsuhizoku, or Kohi for short (Flybone Tribe and Bony for short, in the English translation) are a type of non-humanoid demon that resemble skeletons with bat wings. Their minds are connected, so speaking to one is speaking to the collective whole. They are valued for their reconnaissance and spy skills due to this trait. They first appear in the anime in Season 1, Episode 1 as messengers for Conrad and Gunter. They appear yet again in the next episode to save Yuri from a death blow from Adalbert. It appears that they, too, have a liking for the Maou, as they take drastic measures to save and please him. Adalbert says as Yuri is saved by their kind, "I've never seen the Flybone Tribe behave this way before."

They also play an important role in the game "Hiding Shinou". This game is very much like the Japanese game, "Kick the Can". The ones who hide are meant to step on a head of the Kohi tribe while singing "The Hymn to Shinou, Maruma the Sixth" and the person who is "it" should crawl before the others are able to kick the head away. According to Gunter, "to have your head used for Hiding Shinou is considered the greatest honor to the Kotsuhizoku".

They can be shattered apart but not die because of it. It was revealed in Season 2, Episode 63 that there are specialists who place a sheet over their shattered bodies and, with a bit of magic power, are able to put their bodies back to normal.

Ao

Ao is Yuri's horse. She was so named because Yuri thought that "a Maou has got to have a horse named Ao". She has jet-black fur. Yuri describes her as "shorter and stouter" than racehorses, but with thicker legs, and the disposition of a warhorse. Her breed has two hearts, and it is said it will still carry its master on its back even if one of its heart stops.

== See also ==
- List of Kyo Kara Maoh! media
- List of Kyo Kara Maoh episodes
