= The Loudest Whisper: Uwasa No Futari =

Japanese manga series

ウワサの二人
- Genre: Romance, Yaoi
- Manga
- Written by: Temari Matsumoto
- Published by: Kadokawa Shoten
- English publisher: NA: Blu Manga
- Original run: March 26, 2004 – March 29, 2005
- Volumes: 2

The Loudest Whisper: Uwasa No Futari (ウワサの二人; "Rumored Couple") is the title of a yaoi manga by Temari Matsumoto. The manga is licensed in the United States by BLU, the Boys Love branch of Tokyopop, and was released in Germany by Egmont Manga in 2007.

== Plot ==
Aoyama, who is the student council president of Woods Ka Hill High School, and Vice President Akabane are the best friends. Although they intend to be ordinary friends with each other, for some reason those around them gossip that they are "well-matched couple." One day, Aoyama kisses Akabane on the pretext of an experiment...

== Manga ==
No.	Original release date	Original ISBN	English release date	English ISBN
1	March 27, 2004	4-04-853737-7	July 14, 2009	978-1427815743
2	April 1, 2005	4-04-853817-9	September 29, 2009	978-1427815750

== Reception ==
Carlo Santos, writing for Anime News Network, disliked the 'recycling' of character designs between stories, and felt that the plots were also repetitive. Katja Bürk, writing for animePRO, described the tales as "typical shonen-ai stories". Leroy Douresseaux described the stories as "well done stereotypical seme/uke tales" and found them " oh-so-fun to read". Michelle Smith found the age differences in some stories "disturbing", and found other stories were uninteresting.
