= Cause of My Teacher =

Japanese manga anthology

先生の事情 (Sensei no Jijō)
- Genre: Romance, Yaoi
- Manga
- Written by: Temari Matsumoto
- Published by: Libre Publishing
- English publisher: NA: Blu Manga
- Magazine: Magazine Be × Boy
- Published: June 1, 2007

Cause of My Teacher (先生の事情, Sensei no Jijō) is a Japanese manga anthology written and illustrated by Temari Matsumoto. The manga is licensed in English by Blu Manga, the boys love division of Tokyopop, and was released in September 2009.

== Plot ==
A student who is fond of eyeglasses tells his tender teacher of his feeling. The teacher kisses him but he is a little unsatisfied because the teacher takes the eyeglasses off when they kiss. One of the stories featuring Hiiragi and Asagi is continued in another work by Temari Matsumoto called Shinobu Kokoro: Hidden Heart.

== Reception ==
Leroy Douresseaux of Comic Book Bin felt that the stories in the anthology were too short, wishing some could have been expanded to their own volumes. Jennifer Dunbar, writing for PopCultureShock, felt that manga like Cause of My Teacher "reinforce most of the negative stereotypes of the genre", and disliked the student-teacher theme of the anthology. Johanna Draper Carlson felt that the book had poor characterization and "little plot", suggesting it is aimed at people who have a fetish for "guys with glasses", teachers or ninjas. Carlson felt that the book was a "waste of time" for anyone else.
