= Shinobu Kokoro: Hidden Heart =

Japanese manga

しのぶこころは (Shinobu kokoro wa)
- Genre: Yaoi
- Manga
- Written by: Temari Matsumoto
- Published by: Biblos
- English publisher: NA: Blu Manga
- Magazine: Magazine Be × Boy
- Published: March 10, 2004

Shinobu Kokoro: Hidden Heart (しのぶこころは, Shinobu Kokoro wa) is a ninja yaoi manga by Temari Matsumoto. The manga was licensed in the United States by BLU, the Boys Love branch of Tokyopop, in November 2005.

== Plot ==
Another work by Temari Matsumoto, called Cause of My Teacher also includes a story about Hiiragi and Asagi.

== Reception ==
Krista Hutley for the Library Journal said of Shinobu Kokoro: "Themes of passion and loyalty weave through the three romances, which are sweet if superficial." Tom Rosin for MangaLife noted the explicitness of the manga. Reviewer Julie Rosato disliked how young and compliant the ukes were in the stories, but enjoyed Matsumoto's semes.
