= Just My Luck (manga) =

Japanese manga

僕らの運勢 (Bokura no Unsei)
- Genre: Fantasy, Romance, Yaoi
- Manga
- Written by: Temari Matsumoto
- Published by: Kadokawa Shoten
- English publisher: NA: Blu Manga
- Published: October 3, 2003

Just My Luck (僕らの運勢, Bokura no Unsei; Our Luck) is a yaoi manga by Temari Matsumoto. The manga is one volume with three different one-shot stories and couples. The first is about a teacher and student relationship, the second a toymaker and an android, and the third a school nurse and a student. The manga was licensed in the United States by BLU, the Boys Love branch of TokyoPop, in October 2007.

== Manga ==
No.	Original release date	Original ISBN	English release date	English ISBN
1	October 3, 2003	4-04-853685-0	October 9, 2007	978-1427802798

== Reception ==
Carlo Santos, writing for Anime News Network enjoyed the "moments of comedy" and the drama in Asahi's backstory, but found the sex scenes superfluous and repetitive. Leroy Douresseaux writing for Comic Book Bin praised Matsumoto's art, saying it "captures the yearning and longing of young love with ease and the explicit scenes with a modicum of decorum", recommending it for readers who are looking for something between "non-graphic" stories and "explicit" stories. Ariadne Roberts, writing for Mania Entertainment, described it as "a little cheesy fluff", saying that she felt that the "explicit content" sticker on the front was unwarranted.
