= Temari Matsumoto =

Japanese manga artist

Temari Matsumoto 松本 テマリ
- Born: April 8 Nagano Prefecture, Japan
- Areas: Character design, writer, Manga artist, Illustrator
- Notable works: Kyo Kara Maoh!

Temari Matsumoto (松本 テマリ, Matsumoto Temari) born April 8, is a Japanese manga artist and illustrator from Nagano Prefecture.

She illustrates yaoi light novels and manga. She chose Temari as her pen name since the town she is from, Matsumoto, Nagano Prefecture, is known for making temari.

== Works ==
=== Manga ===
- Just My Luck (僕らの運勢, Bokura no Unsei; Our Luck), one volume, 2003
- Paradise e Oideyo! (パラダイスへおいでよ!; Come to Paradise) (Story by Barugo Hotaka), one volume, 2003
- Ōji-sama no Obenkyō (王子様のお勉強), one volume, 2004
- The Loudest Whisper: Uwasa No Futari (ウワサの二人, Uwasa no Futari; The rumored couple), two volumes, 2004
- Shinobu Kokoro: Hidden Heart (しのぶこころは, Shinobu Kokoro wa; A hidden heart is...), one volume, 2004
- Cause of My Teacher (先生の事情, Sensei no Jijō), one volume, 2005
- Kyo Kara Maoh! (今日からマのつく自由業!, Kyou Kara MA no Tsuku Jiyuugyou) (Story by Tomo Takabayashi) 16 volumes (ongoing) 2005
- Cubism Love (キュピズム・ラブ) 2011

=== Illustrations ===
- Kyo Kara Maoh! series(Story by Tomo Takabayashi)
- Seitouin Gakuen Fuuki (青桃院学園風紀録) (Story by Tatsuki Shindou)
- Grand Master! (グランドマスター！) (Story by Satomi Kikawa)
- Animate Concierge (アニメイト・コンシェルジュ)
