= Kyo Kara Maoh! =

Series of Japanese light novels

- Cover of the first light novel

今日から㋮王! (Kyō Kara Maō!)
- Genre: Fantasy comedy, isekai, boys love
- Light novel
- Written by: Tomo Takabayashi
- Illustrated by: Temari Matsumoto
- Published by: Kadokawa Shoten
- Imprint: Kadokawa Beans Bunko
- Original run: November 2000 – January 2010 (hiatus)
- Volumes: 22 (17 main story, 5 extra story)
- Anime television series
- Directed by: Junji Nishimura
- Produced by: Yūji Shibata
- Written by: Akemi Omode
- Music by: Yoichiro Yoshikawa
- Studio: Studio Deen
- Licensed by: AUS: Madman Entertainment; NA: Discotek Media
- Original network: NHK
- English network: US: Imaginasian
- Original run: April 3, 2004 – February 19, 2009
- Episodes: 117
- Original video animation

Kyo Kara Maoh! R
- Directed by: Junji Nishimura
- Produced by: Yūji Shibata; Sōmei Tanaka; Masato Aoyama
- Written by: Akemi Omode
- Music by: Yoichiro Yoshikawa
- Studio: Studio Deen
- Licensed by: AUS: Madman Entertainment; NA: Discotek Media
- Released: October 26, 2007 – February 27, 2008
- Episodes: 5
- Manga
- Written by: Tomo Takabayashi
- Illustrated by: Temari Matsumoto
- Published by: Kadokawa Shoten
- English publisher: NA: Tokyopop (expired); NA: Viz Media (kindle edition)
- Magazine: Asuka
- Original run: April 23, 2005 – July 23, 2016
- Volumes: 21
- Video game

Kyo Kara Maoh! Hajimari no Tabi
- Developer: Namco
- Publisher: Namco
- Music by: Akihiko Ishikawa; Go Shiina; Yusuke Beppu
- Genre: Action
- Platform: PlayStation 2
- Released: July 27, 2006
- Audio drama

Shin Makoku Radio
- icon

Kyo Kara Maoh! (今日から㋮王!, Kyō Kara Maō!; "Demon King from Today!") is a series of Japanese light novels written by Tomo Takabayashi and illustrated by Temari Matsumoto. The story follows the adventures of Yuri Shibuya, an average 15-year-old Japanese high school student, who is suddenly transported to another world where he is told that he is now the king of demons.

Yuri becomes the king of a nation where all of the citizens are demons, but they appear indistinguishable from humans. Their only distinguishing traits are their long lives and the ability to use magic. The people of the Demon Tribe are able to make a pact with an element after which they can then use magic of that element. Covenant Castle is in the capital of the Demon Kingdom and the residence of the demon king. The culture of The Great Demon Kingdom is very different from the Japanese culture Yuri is accustomed to, and the differences make for amusing mishaps with long-ranging consequences, such as an accidental proposal of marriage.

The series was adapted into an anime in 2004 by NHK and a manga in 2005 serialized in Asuka magazine. The manga was updated for release by VIZ Media and launched in North America on September 30, 2014.

== Plot ==
While on his way home from school, Yuri Shibuya sees his classmate, Ken Murata, being harassed by bullies. When Yuri intervenes, Murata runs away, and Yuri becomes their new target. They force him into the girls' bathroom and shove his face into a toilet, where a portal suddenly appears. Yuri is sucked in and is rendered unconscious. He wakes up to discover himself in a strange world where no one speaks Japanese. Yuri comes to find out that he is of demon (魔族, Mazoku) lineage and is the king (魔王, Maou; Mazoku King) of this world, The Great Demon Kingdom (眞魔国, Shin Makoku; True Mazoku Land).

He is taken to the capital by Günter and Conrad. When he arrives at the castle, he meets Wolfram and Gwendal, who find it hard to believe that Yuri is their new king. At dinner the next day, Yuri slaps Wolfram after the latter insults Yuri's mother for being human. Unknown to Yuri, among the nobles in the Demon Kingdom, a slap on the cheek is considered a marriage proposal. Wolfram is insulted and immediately challenges him to a duel by throwing his knife on the floor. Yuri, again being unfamiliar with the kingdom's customs, picks up the knife, unknowingly accepting the duel. After Yuri wins by using magical powers he was unaware he possessed, he is accepted as the true demon king.

The story follows Yuri on his adventures trying to learn the ways of the Great Demon Kingdom while battling discrimination and fear. He does not know much of the world but applies his moral judgment onto every situation in order to find a peaceful outcome. His ultimate goal is to bring peace to both demons and humans, hoping to one day live together while avoiding war at all costs. Even though he has the choice of leaving his responsibilities to his advisers, he continues to involve himself in most affairs in the belief that to be a great king he must be willing to know his subjects and risk everything to protect the kingdom.

Yuri also battles with the notion of belonging to one world. While he misses his home in Japan on Earth, he develops a family and home in the Great Demon Kingdom, which leads to some very hard choices.

Although romance is not a main focus of the story, the anime has been noted for its shōnen-ai undertones. For example, Yuri and Wolfram are engaged, and a number of jokes in the series revolve around misunderstandings that arise from this arrangement.

== Media ==
=== Light novels ===
Written by Tomo Takabayashi with illustrations by Temari Matsumoto. The novels are released under Kadokawa's Beans Collection. The first novel was released in November 2000. There are currently 22 books in the series. 17 are main story novels and the other 5 are extras and side stories which provide background and other information to the story.

=== Official Doujinshi ===
So far several doujinshi have been released by the author and artist under the title of APOLLO (アポロ) that have continuation of elements from the original series. In particular APOLLO 00 in 2008, APOLLO 0.1 in 2009, and APOLLO 01 in 2019. In these was the original planned ending in which most of the story was a dream, however this ending was discarded.

=== Manga ===
Drawn by Temari Matsumoto, the Kyo Kara Maoh! manga series (Titled Kyō Kara MA no Tsuku Jiyūgyō! (今日からマのつく自由業!) in Japanese) debuted in June 2005 issue of the monthly Asuka magazine on April 23, 2005, and ended on July 23, 2016. The first volume of the manga was released on December 26, 2005, and 21 volumes total have been released.

An English-language version of the manga was licensed by Tokyopop but when Tokyopop shut down their North American branch in 2011 all of their licenses were cancelled. They released seven volumes of the manga before they shut down. After 3 years, VIZ Media licensed a digital release in North America, releasing the seven volumes in 2014.

=== Anime ===
The anime adaptation of Kyo Kara Maoh was directed by Junji Nishimura, animated by Studio Deen, and produced by NHK. It aired across Japan on NHK. The series consists of 117 episodes and 5 OVA episodes. While much the first season follows the original story from the novels, the plot in the following seasons varies drastically.

The anime was originally licensed for release in North America by Geneon under the title Kyo Kara Maoh! God(?) Save Our King!, but when Geneon ceased production of their titles in late 2007, it left three volumes of the second season unreleased on DVD in North America. On July 3, 2008, Geneon Entertainment and Funimation Entertainment announced an agreement to distribute select titles in North America. While Geneon Entertainment will still retain the license, Funimation Entertainment will assume exclusive rights to the manufacturing, marketing, sales and distribution of select titles. Kyo Kara Maoh! was one of the titles involved in the deal. In August 2011, Funimation announced that the license expired and that they had no plans to renew the license. On February 22, 2019, Discotek Media announced its license of the first season for an April 30, 2019, Blu-ray release.

=== Musical ===
In April 2013 the series was adapted into a musical titled Kyo Kara Maoh! Birth of the Maou. It showed for 11 days during golden week at the Hakuhinkan theater. It was produced by Sōgō Vision.

A second musical adaptation titled Kyo Kara Maoh! Second Advent of the Demon King premiered in 2015. It ran in Tokyo's Space Zero from October 1 to October 11.

A third musical ran in 2016, titled Kyo Kara Maoh! The Demon King Runaway Edition. It featured an original story, running in Tokyo's Space Zero from November 3 to November 13.

== Reception ==
In the Animage Anime Grand Prix award, the anime placed seventh for best anime in the 2004 poll. In the 2005 poll, Season 2 of the anime placed second in the award for best anime, while Season 1 placed fifth. That same year, the anime held multiple rankings in the best episode poll, the best character polls, and the best anime song poll. The anime placed twelfth in the 2006 best anime poll, and eighteenth in the 2008 best anime poll.

Danica Davidson of Graphic Novel Reporter commented positively on the manga, stating that it was a "fun and whimsical read" with fascinating characters and a "strong" narrative.

Carlo Santos of Anime News Network called the anime "an unusual take on the fantasy genre" with its unique elements, and remarked that it would appeal to viewers tired of stories "taking themselves too seriously" and "need[ing] a good laugh". Chris Beveridge of Mania described the anime as a mix of various genres that worked "really well" together and praised its casting, humor, and action sequences. He concluded that the series' "interesting world" had "wide appeal" and "lots of promise".
