= Shizuka Gozen =

Japanese noble

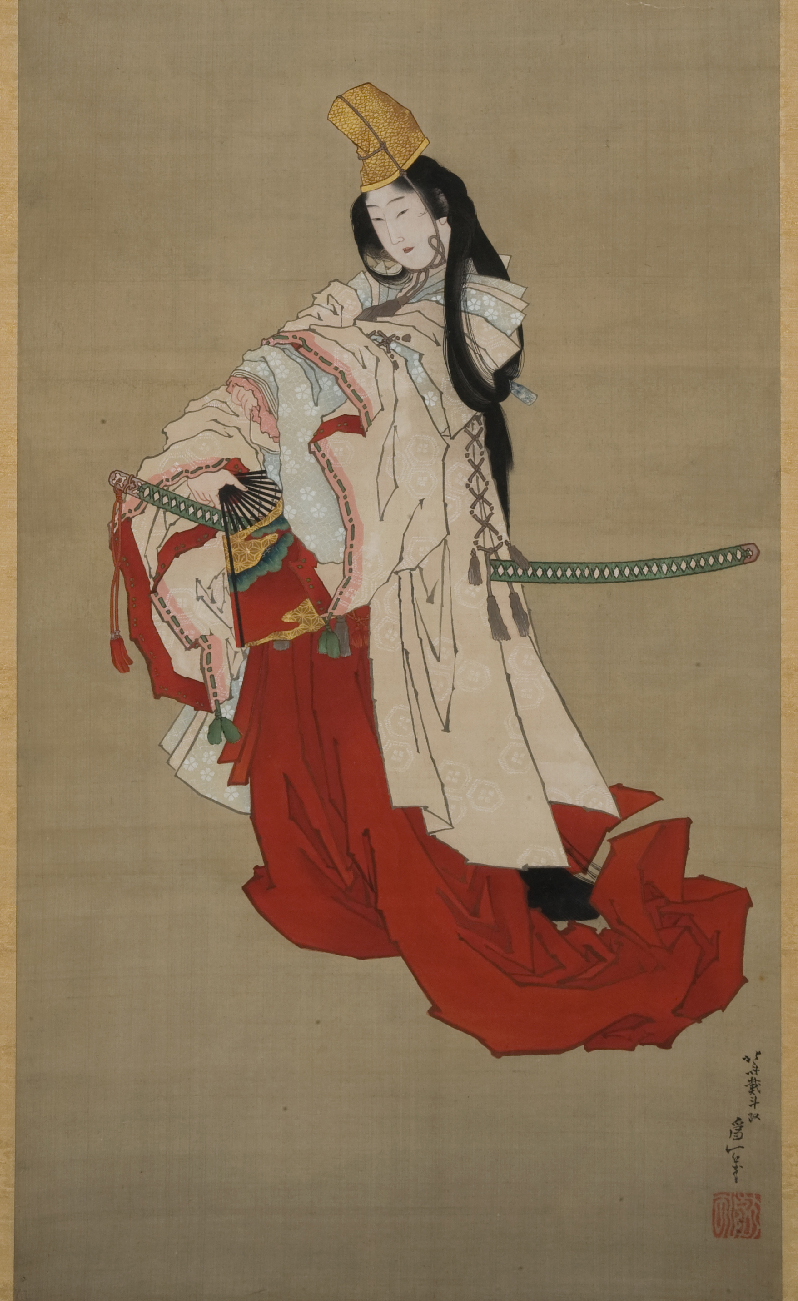
Painting of Shizuka Gozen (lady Shizuka) by Katsushika Hokusai of the most famous shirabyōshi

Shizuka Gozen (静御前) (1165–1211), or Lady Shizuka, one of the most famous women in Japanese history and literature, was a shirabyōshi (court dancer) of the 12th century, and a mistress of Minamoto no Yoshitsune. She is a prominent figure in Japanese literature and is frequently noted in traditional accounts for her exceptional skill as a dancer. Because she is featured in the Heike Monogatari (Tale of Heike), the Gikeiki (Chronicle of Yoshitsune), and numerous plays, her story is a familiar part of Japanese culture, though her legendary status makes it difficult to separate historical fact from fiction.

== Life ==
Her birthplace is generally accepted to have been the Iso (shoreline) district of the town of Aminochō in the historic Tango Province, where she is regarded as one of the "seven princesses of Tango". She still has a shrine in the town and represents its principal deity. Her mother, Iso no Zenji, was a shirabyōshi as well. According to the Gikeiki, Shizuka was invited at one point by Retired Emperor Go-Shirakawa, along with 99 other dancers, to dance for rain after the chanting of 100 Buddhist monks failed to bring that same result. Though the 99 dancers likewise failed to bring rain, Shizuka's arrival brought the desired effect. She was then praised by the Emperor, and it was at this time that she met Yoshitsune.

When Yoshitsune fled Kyoto in 1185, after the end of the Genpei War, and following a disagreement with his brother, Yoritomo, the first Kamakura shōgun, Shizuka was left behind in Mount Yoshino. The exact details of how far she traveled with Yoshitsune before being sent back, or whether she traveled further than Yoshino at all, differ from one literary work to the next, as do many of the other finer details of her tale. In any case, she was captured by Hōjō Tokimasa and forces loyal to Yoritomo, and, according to some versions of the story, forced to dance for the new shōgun at Tsurugaoka Hachiman-gū. There, she sang songs of her longing for Yoshitsune, which angered Yoritomo; but Yoritomo's wife Hōjō Masako was sympathetic, and helped assuage his anger.

However, she was by this point pregnant with Yoshitsune's child; Yoritomo declared that if it were a daughter she could live on peacefully, but if it were a son, he would have the child killed. A short time later, when Shizuka was 19, she gave birth to a son; Adachi Kiyotsune tried to take the child, who was instead given to Shizuka's mother. She then traveled back to Kyoto, where she became a Buddhist nun. Shizuka was later killed, however, along with her and Yoshitsune's child, by the order of Yoritomo.

According to some versions of the story, she did not become a nun upon her return, nor was she killed. Alternatively, she returned to Kyoto and was welcomed by Hōjō Masako back into court life, where she remained for a time. She then left the capital once more, committing suicide by drowning herself in a river, though versions differ on where this occurred.

== Commemoration ==
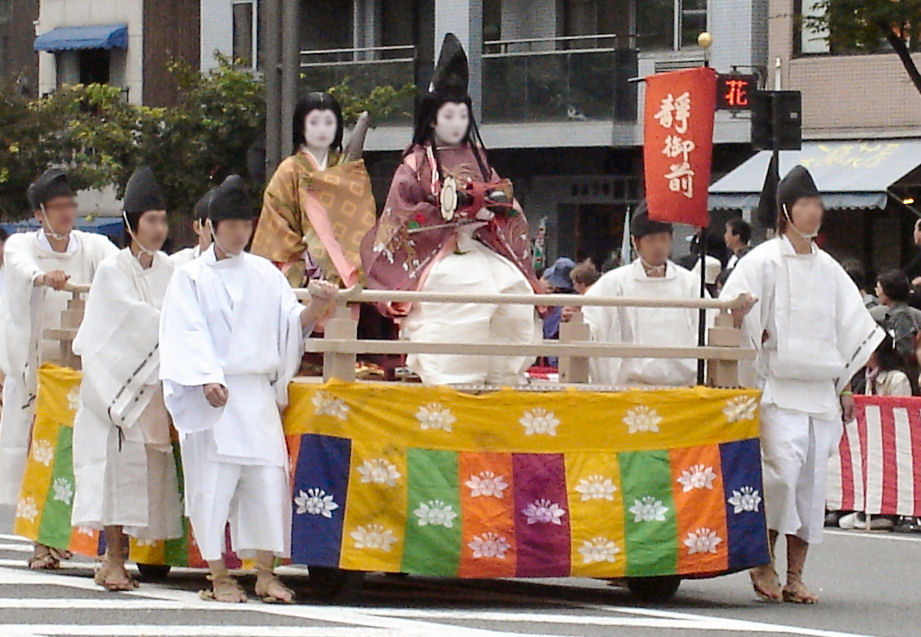
Shizuka Gozen portrayed in a festival.

Shizuka features prominently in the Noh play Funa Benkei and the bunraku play Yoshitsune Senbon Zakura, both of which were later adapted by kabuki, and in a number of other works of literature and drama, both traditional and modern. She is also celebrated throughout the country in various festivals; many towns across Japan claim to be the location for her religious exile, her death, or other significant events of her life.

== In popular culture ==
- Satomi Ishihara portrays her in her traditional narrative role in the 2005 Taiga drama Yoshitsune. The series incorporates the idea that she gave birth to Yoshitsune's son, who was subsequently killed by order of Yoritomo.
- Shizuka is represented in the 2005 video game Genji: Dawn of the Samurai, as "Gozen Shizuka" (Lady Shizuka), a character who aids the protagonist, Yoshitsune Minamoto and his ally (a former enemy) Saito Musashibo Benkei during the course of the game. She is the survivor who possesses the power of Yosegane, and she returns in the 2006 PlayStation 3 sequel, Genji: Days of the Blade as one of playable characters, where she is depicted similarly.
- In Michiyo Akaishi's manga Ten yori mo hoshi yori mo, main character Mio is implied to be the reincarnation of Shizuka. Her love interests Tadaomi and Shou are said to be the reincarnations of Yoritomo and Yoshitsune, respectively.
- Shizuka Gozen is the final boss of the 2019 entry in the Samurai Shodown series.
- In Otomate visual novel Birushana Senki, the protagonist Shanaou is loosely based on Shizuka Gozen, whereas her childhood friend and potential love interest Shungen is revealed to be the real Minamoto no Yoshitsune, in Shungen's route, Shanaou had disguised herself as a shirabyōshi dancer, a reference to the original Shizuka Gozen.

== Gallery ==
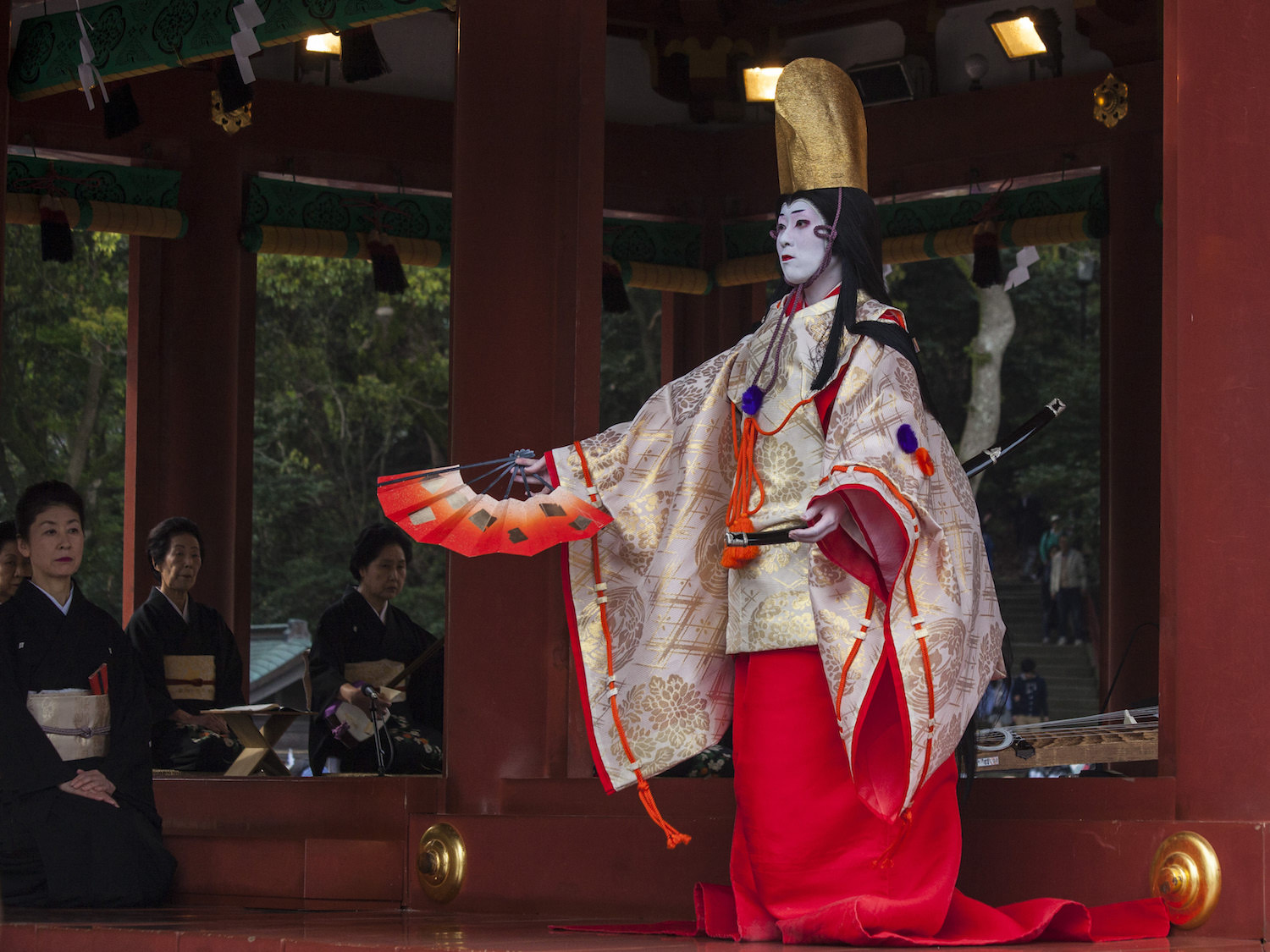
Shizukano Mai (Tsuruoka Hachimangu), 12 April 2015

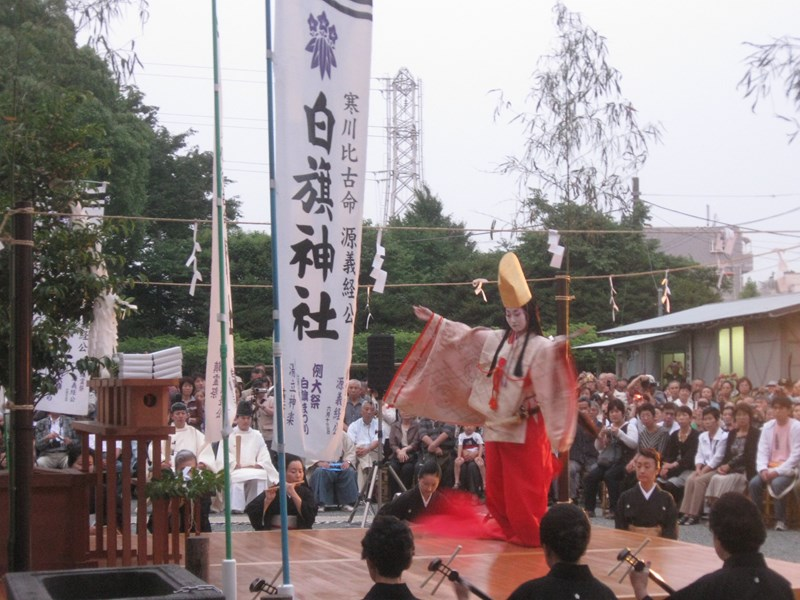
Dance of Shizuka (Fujisawa City), 13 June 2009

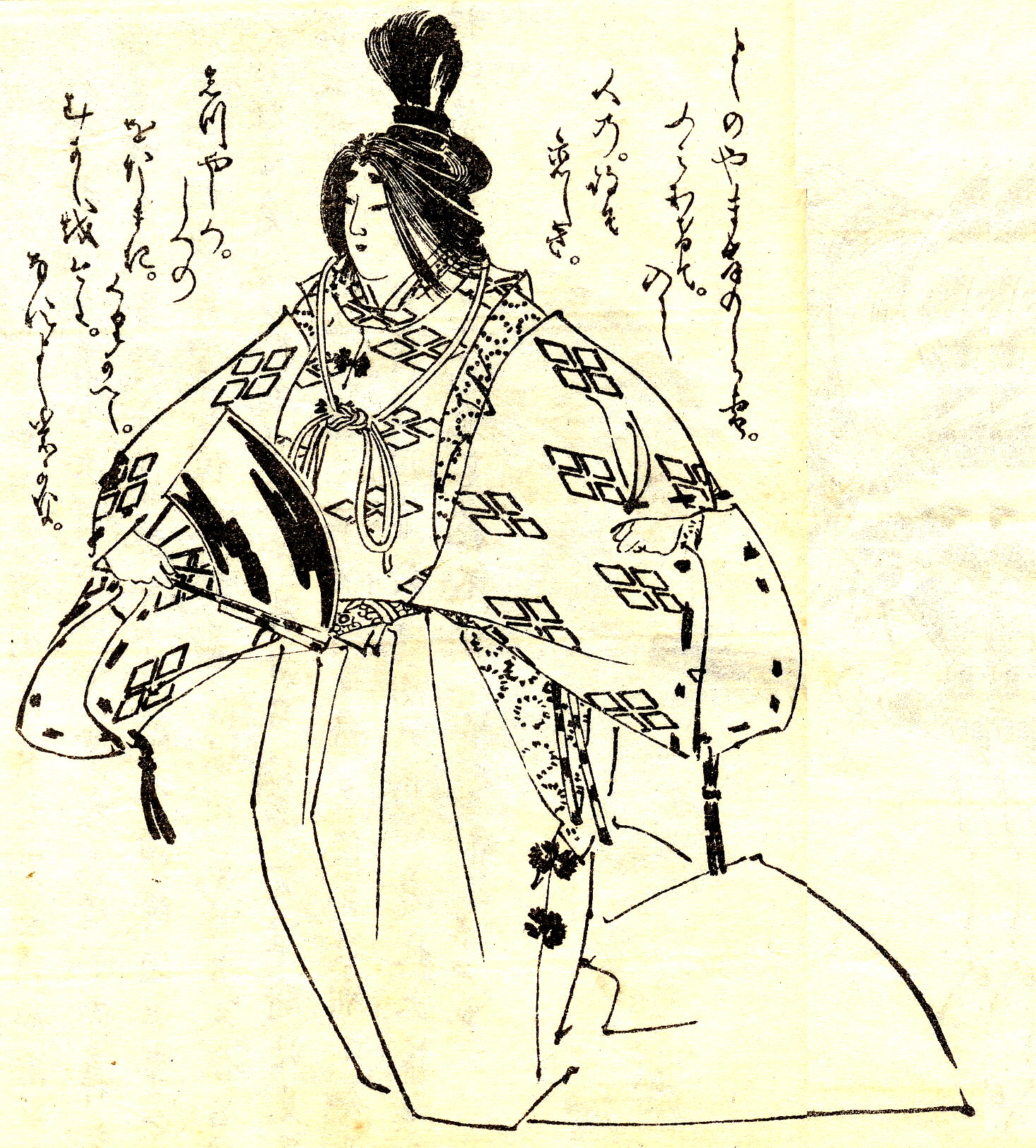
Lady Shizuka, in a book illustration by Kikuchi Yōsai

== See also ==
- Tomoe Gozen
