= Even If Tempest =

2022 video game

- even if TEMPEST
- Genre: Otome game, Visual novel
- Video game

even if TEMPEST
- Developer: unico
- Publisher: Voltage
- Directed by: Shio Ayane
- Designed by: Norita
- Music by: Shunsuke Tsuchiya
- Platform: Nintendo Switch; Steam
- Released: WW: June 9, 2022; WW: September 24, 2026 (Steam)
- Video game

even if TEMPEST: Dawning Connections
- Developer: unico
- Publisher: Voltage
- Directed by: Shio Ayane
- Designed by: Norita
- Music by: Shunsuke Tsuchiya
- Platform: Nintendo Switch
- Released: WW: October 26, 2023

Even If Tempest (even if TEMPEST 宵闇にかく語りき魔女, even if TEMPEST: Yoiyami ni Kaku Katariki Majo; lit. 'even if TEMPEST: The Witch Who Spoke Amidst the Twilight') is a Japanese otome game developed by unico and publoshed by Voltage. It was released on June 9, 2022.

A sequel titled Even If TEMPEST: Dawning Connections (even if TEMPEST 連なるときの暁, even if TEMPEST: Tsuranaru Toki no Akatsuki; lit. 'even if TEMPEST: The Dawn of Connection') was released on October 26, 2023.

== Characters ==
=== Protagonist ===
Anastasia Lynzel (アナスタシア・リンゼル, Anasutashia Rinzeru)
The protagonist who is 18 years old. Despite being born into a marquis family, she was shunned by her stepmother and forced to live a life of misfortune, residing in an attic since childhood. However, after obtaining the power to alter the past known as "Return by Death," her fate changes drastically. Characterized by her red hair, her hobby is physical training.

=== Love Interests ===
Lucien Neuschburn (ルーシェン・ノイシュバーン, Rūshen Noishubān)
Voiced by Kaito Ishikawa
18 years old, the third prince of the Kingdom of Historica. Although he holds rights to the royal succession, the past abuse he suffered from relatives due to his mother's low birth leaves him kind-hearted yet cowardly and prone to tears. However, a certain turning point completely reverses people's evaluation of him. He likes cats.

Crius Castlerock (クライオス・キャソロック, Kuraiosu Kyasorokku)
Voiced by Makoto Furukawa
26 years old, Vice Commander of the Garuda Wing Knights. A gentlemanly and caring leader who is deeply trusted by his subordinates. While he appears to have a flawless personality, unnatural behavior can occasionally be glimpsed from him. His hobby is swordsmanship.

Tyril I. Lister (ティレル・Ｉ・リスター, Tireru I Risutā)
Voiced by Noriaki Sugiyama
26 years old, head of the Inquisitors. Due to his role in condemning witches, he is shunned by citizens, but adored by his subordinates. An intellectual, logical mind. He has a very foul mouth, but is kind at heart. Crius and Zenn are his only friends. His hobby is drinking.

Zenn Sorfield (ゼン・ソルフィールド, Zen Sorufīrudo)
Voiced by Shunsuke Takeuchi
A mysterious figure. Large-framed, blunt, stern-faced, and intimidating. The protagonist does not know whether he is an ally or an enemy, but he appears wherever she goes. His hobby is wandering.

=== Other Characters ===
Maya Kirkland (マヤ・カークランド, Maya Kākurando)
Voiced by Suzuko Mimori
26 years old, a maid of the Lynzel family.

Conrad Neuschburn (コンラッド・ノイシュバーン, Konrad Noishubān)
Voiced by Yuichi Hose
24 years old, the first prince of the Kingdom of Historica.

Parker Neuschburn (パーカー・ノイシュバーン, Pākā Noishubān)
Voiced by Yuki Fujisawa
20 years old, the second prince of the Kingdom of Historica.

Evelina Lynzel (エヴェリーナ・リンゼル, Everīna Rinzeru)
Voiced by: Naomi Iida
40 years old, the second wife of Marquis Lynzel and biological younger sister of the King of Historica.

Aura Lynzel (オーラ・リンゼル, Ōra Rinzeru)
Voiced by Natsume Oki
16 years old, the protagonist's stepsister. Biological child of Evelina. Her hobby is interior decoration.

Hugo Spencer (ヒューゴ・スペンサー, Hyūgo Supensā)
Voiced by Shoya Chiba
17 years old, a knight candidate of the Garuda Wing Knights. His father is a clergyman.

Mitchell Howard (ミッチェル・ホワード, Mitcheru Howādo)
Voiced by Sho Nogami
19 years old, a knight candidate of the Garuda Wing Knights. Born into a merchant family, he is tactful and good at business.

Landon Woolley (ランドン・ウーリー, Randon Urī)
Voiced by Hiroyuki Tsunakawa
18 years old, a knight candidate of the Garuda Wing Knights. Has a rough personality, but possesses great reflexes. He harbor feelings for Maya.

Mel Diaz (メイル・ディアス, Meiru Diasu)
Voiced by Ryuichi Kijima
28 years old, a court painter. Acclaimed as a genius, he has numerous fans.

Rune (ルーン, Rūn)
Voiced by Tasuku Hatanaka
A mysterious figure living in an alternate world. Looks like a young boy and wields mysterious powers.

Witch of Ruin (破滅の魔女, Hametsu no Majo)
Voiced by Tetsuya Kakihara
A chaotic figure who appears before the protagonist. Hostile toward Rune, plunges humans into confusion.

Mr. Ender (エンダーさん, Endā-san)
A "creature" with a clown-like appearance. Appears in a certain route, but its true identity is shrouded in mystery.

== Production and release ==
Even If Tempest (even if TEMPEST 宵闇にかく語りき魔女, even if TEMPEST: Yoiyami ni Kaku Katariki Majo; lit. 'even if TEMPEST: The Witch Who Spoke Amidst the Twilight') was originally announced on October 21, 2021, to be in development for the Nintendo Switch, directed by Shio Ayane, with the art by the illustrator Norita, and music by Shunsuke Tsuchiya. The game's opening theme and official website were released on December 6, 2021. On April 20, 2022, a promotional video was released, and the game was later released worldwide on June 9, 2022. Voltage released the game on Steam on September 24, 2026.

Production of a fan disc titled Even If TEMPEST: Dawning Connections (even if TEMPEST 連なるときの暁, even if TEMPEST: Tsuranaru Toki no Akatsuki; lit. 'even if TEMPEST: The Dawn of Connection') was announced in October 2022. On May 19, 2023, the game's official website was released, alongside a trailer for the game. The game was originally meant to be released in the summer of 2023; however, it was delayed and later released on October 26, 2023.

Both games have been released in Chinese (Traditional and Simplified).

== Reception ==
By November 2022, the game had sold more than 10,000 copies. On May 29, 2024, Voltage announced that the original game had sold more than 30,000 copies. By March 2025, the games had sold over 50,000 copies worldwide.

Jenni Lada from Silliconera called Even If Tempest a "fairly graphic game." She talked about the constant investigations alongside the chosen love interests before going to the witch trial, searching for revelations, stating that it made it feel more like an adventure game. However, she wished that the revelations had been more spaced out instead of constantly rushing. Lada liked Anastasia as a "strong willed" individual and her design. However, Lada disliked the constant glitches faced in her gameplay, such as her personal protagonist still being referred to as Anastasia when she had changed the name, and the game crashing after Anastasia received her destiny. She called Even If Tempest an otome game that "dares to be different" in terms of gameplay, story, and tone. However, she disliked the more time spent on saving her progress when the game could potentially crash.
