= Makoto Furukawa =

Japanese voice actor and singer

- 古川 慎
- Born: September 29, 1989 (age 37); Kumamoto Prefecture, Japan
- Occupations: Voice actor, singer
- Years active: 2011–present
- Agent: Toy's Factory
- Notable credits: One-Punch Man as Saitama; Kaguya-sama: Love Is War as Miyuki Shirogane; Golden Time as Banri Tada; Fate/Apocrypha as Rider of Red/Achilles; Dr. Stone as Taiju Ōki; Mobile Suit Gundam: The Witch from Mercury as Shaddiq Zenelli; Blue Lock as Tabito Karasu; Honkai: Star Rail as Gepard Landau; Path to Nowhere as Levy

Makoto Furukawa (古川 慎, Furukawa Makoto; born September 29, 1989) is a Japanese voice actor and singer previously affiliated with Space Craft Entertainment. He became a freelancer in September 2018. He joined the record label Toy's Factory in December 2018. He made his solo singer debut under Lantis in July 2018 with the song "miserable masquerade" produced by Satoru Kuwabara. He portrayed Saitama in One-Punch Man, Miyuki Shirogane in Kaguya-sama: Love Is War, Banri Tada in Golden Time, Taiju Oki in Dr. Stone, Rider of Red/Achilles in Fate/Apocrypha, Shaddiq Zenelli in Mobile Suit Gundam: The Witch from Mercury, and Tabito Karasu in Blue Lock. He also played two different versions of Sherlock Holmes in Moriarty the Patriot and The Tale of the Outcasts.

== Voice roles ==
=== Anime series ===
2012

- Hidamari Sketch × Honeycomb, Yoshio

2013

- A Certain Scientific Railgun S, Kenji Madarame
- Gaist Crusher, Shiren Quartzheart
- Golden Time, Banri Tada
- Log Horizon, Smoking Thunder
- Sunday Without God, Menhim

2014

- Aldnoah.Zero, Shigō Kakei
- Haikyū!!, Yūtarō Kindaichi
- Bladedance of Elementalers, Kamito Kazehaya

2015

- Aldnoah.Zero Part 2, Shigō Kakei
- Haikyū!! 2, Yūtarō Kindaichi
- Is It Wrong to Try to Pick Up Girls in a Dungeon?, Miach
- High School DxD BorN, Diodora Astaroth
- Mikagura School Suite, Sadamatsu Minatogawa
- One-Punch Man, Saitama
- The Heroic Legend of Arslan, Kirus
- Anti-Magic Academy: The 35th Test Platoon, Reima Tenmyōji

2016

- Please Tell Me! Galko-chan, Bomuo
- PriPara, Ham
- Orange, Hiroto Suwa
- Taboo Tattoo, Justice "Seigi" Akatsuka
- The Disastrous Life of Saiki K., Male Ghost
- 91 Days, Arturo Tronco
- Digimon Universe: Appli Monsters, Yūjin Ōzora
- Touken Ranbu: Hanamaru, Ookurikara
- Duel Masters VSRF, Number 2

2017

- ACCA: 13-Territory Inspection Dept., Biscuit
- One Piece, Zappa
- Beyblade Burst God, Joshua Boon
- Akashic Records of Bastard Magic Instructor, Rainer
- Katsugeki/Touken Ranbu, Ookurikara
- Fate/Apocrypha, Rider of Red/Achilles
- Altair: A Record of Battles, Zaganos Zehir
- TSUKIPRO THE ANIMATION, Soshi Kagurazaka

2018

- Touken Ranbu: Hanamaru 2, Ookurikara
- My Hero Academia 3, Seiji Shishikura
- Hakyu Hoshin Engi, Nataku
- Banana Fish, Shorter Wong
- That Time I Got Reincarnated as a Slime, Benimaru
- Strike the Blood, Veres Aladar

2019

- Kaguya-sama: Love Is War, Miyuki Shirogane
- Fruits Basket, Hatsuharu Sōma
- Kono Oto Tomare! Sounds of Life, Michitaka Sakai
- One-Punch Man 2, Saitama
- Dr. Stone, Taiju Ōki
- Vinland Saga, The Ear
- Ahiru no Sora, Shingo Katori
- Stars Align, Takuto Murakami
- Demon Slayer: Kimetsu no Yaiba, Gotou
- The King of Fighters for Girls, Yomi

2020

- number24, Taisei Uchinashi
- Drifting Dragons, Faye
- Kaguya-sama: Love Is War?, Miyuki Shirogane
- Natsunagu!, Masayoshi Maezono
- Woodpecker Detective's Office, Bokusui Wakayama
- Fire Force, Ogun Montgomery
- No Guns Life, Colt
- Mr Love: Queen's Choice, Shaw
- MORIARTY THE PATRIOT, Sherlock Holmes
- The Misfit of Demon King Academy, Laos Kanon Jilfor
- By the Grace of the Gods, Tabuchi
- Yu-Gi-Oh! Sevens, Nanami Maguro
- IDOLiSH7 Second Beat!, Rinto Okazaki

2021

- Show by Rock!! Stars!!, Rikao
- Skate-Leading Stars, Hayato Sasugai
- That Time I Got Reincarnated as a Slime Season 2, Benimaru
- Dr. Stone: Stone Wars, Taiju Ōki
- Burning Kabaddi, Kei Iura
- Kuro-Gyaru ni Natta Kara Shinyū to Shite Mita, Rui Chihaya
- Mars Red, Rufus Glenn
- The Slime Diaries: That Time I Got Reincarnated as a Slime, Benimaru
- Odd Taxi, Yamamoto
- 86, Shourei Nouzen
- Re-Main, Takekazu Ejiri
- TSUKIPRO THE ANIMATION 2, Soshi Kagurazaka
- The Vampire Dies in No Time, Ronaldo
- Visual Prison, Guiltia Brion
- IDOLiSH7 Third Beat!, Rinto Okazaki
- Umamusume: Pretty Derby, Minamizaka

2022

- Fantasia Sango – Realm of Legends, Teiken
- Salaryman's Club, Naohiro Izumo
- Love All Play, Kōki Matsuda
- Aoashi, Eita Takasugi
- Kaguya-sama: Love Is War – Ultra Romantic, Miyuki Shirogane
- Fuuto PI, Ryū Terui
- Mobile Suit Gundam: The Witch from Mercury, Shaddiq Zenelli
- Play It Cool, Guys, Motoharu Igarashi

2023

- The Tale of the Outcasts, Holmes
- In/Spectre 2nd Season, Masayuki Muroi
- Technoroid Overmind, Kite
- The Angel Next Door Spoils Me Rotten, Shuuto Fujimiya
- Blue Lock, Tabito Karasu
- Hell's Paradise: Jigokuraku, Yamada Asaemon Eizen
- Opus Colors, Chiharu Sakaki
- Magical Destroyers, Otaku Hero
- Ao no Orchestra, Ichirō Yamada
- Pokémon Horizons: The Series, Spinel
- Zom 100: Bucket List of the Dead, Kenichiro Ryuzaki
- Reign of the Seven Spellblades, Joseph Albright
- I'm Giving the Disgraced Noble Lady I Rescued a Crash Course in Naughtiness, Cecil
- Tearmoon Empire, Dion Alaia
- Rurouni Kenshin, Shishio Makoto
- Beyblade X, Kadovar

2024

- Solo Leveling, Woo Jinchul
- Cherry Magic! Thirty Years of Virginity Can Make You a Wizard?!, Masato Tsuge
- Bucchigiri?!, Jabashiri
- The Elusive Samurai, Ashikaga Tadayoshi
- Bartender: Glass of God, Kelvin Chen
- A Salad Bowl of Eccentrics, Sōsuke Kaburaya
- Kaiju No. 8, Ryō Ikaruga
- How to Become Ordinary, Kengo Dōjima
- Twilight Out of Focus, Zin Kikuchihara
- The Do-Over Damsel Conquers the Dragon Emperor, Listeard

2025

- Rurouni Kenshin: Kyoto Disturbance, Makoto Shishio
- The Red Ranger Becomes an Adventurer in Another World, Azir Anuma Kukuja
- The Beginning After the End, Grey
- Lazarus, Doug
- Fermat Kitchen, Ichitarō Hirose
- Pass the Monster Meat, Milady!, Anbry Shal
- Ninja vs. Gokudo, Sako Hasegawa
- The Dark History of the Reincarnated Villainess, Ginoford Dandelion

2026

- An Adventurer's Daily Grind at Age 29, Shinonome Hajime
- Easygoing Territory Defense by the Optimistic Lord, Ortho
- Though I Am an Inept Villainess, Ei Gyōmei
- Reborn as a Space Mercenary: I Woke Up Piloting the Strongest Starship!, Hiro
- The Oblivious Saint Can't Contain Her Power, Edward

2027

- Blade & Bastard, Iarumas

=== Original net animation ===
- A.I.C.O. -Incarnation- (2018), Yoshihiko Sagami
- JoJo's Bizarre Adventure: Stone Ocean (2022), Rikiel
- Pokémon: Paldean Winds (2023), Arven
- Onimusha (2023), Gensai
- Bullet/Bullet (2025), Barrel

=== Original video animation ===
- Code Geass: Rozé of the Recapture (2024), Ash

=== Film ===
- The Anthem of the Heart (2015), Toshinori Iwaki
- Orange: Future (2016), Hiroto Suwa
- Fairy Tail: Dragon Cry (2017), King Animus
- Mobile Suit Gundam Narrative (2018)
- Blue Thermal (2022), Ryōhei Nanba
- That Time I Got Reincarnated as a Slime the Movie: Scarlet Bond (2022), Benimaru
- Kaguya-sama: Love Is War – The First Kiss That Never Ends (2022), Miyuki Shirogane
- Yamato yo Towa ni: Rebel 3199 (2024), Alphon
- Fuuto PI: The Portrait of Kamen Rider Skull (2024), Ryū Terui

=== Tokusatsu ===
- Kamen Rider Ghost (2015), Second Katana Gamma (ep. 13 (First Voiced by Takahiro Fujiwara (ep. 1))
- Shuriken Sentai Ninninger vs. ToQger the Movie: Ninja in Wonderland (2016), Dark Akaninger

=== Video games ===
2015

- THE iDOLM@STER: SideM, Asselin BB II
- Touken Ranbu, Ookurikara
- Yumeiro Cast, Kuroki Ryousuke

2016

- Shin Sangoku Musou Eiketsuden, Lei Bin
- Idolish7, Okazaki Rinto
- Ikemen Revolution, Kyle Ash
- Psychedelica of the Ashen Hawk, Lugus
- Steam Prison, Adage

2017

- Akane-sasu Sekai de Kimi to Utau, Mononobe no Moriya
- Fire Emblem Heroes, Sylvain Jose Gautier
- TSUKINO PARADISE, Soshi Kagurazaka

2018

- Charade Maniacs, Dazai Mei
- Fate/Grand Order, Achilles
- Mega Man 11, Fuse Man
- Steam Prison, Adage
- Warriors Orochi 4, Ares
- SHOW BY ROCK!!, Rikao

2019

- Bungō to Alchemist, Tokutomi Roka
- Samurai Shodown, Yoshitora Tokugawa
- Fire Emblem: Three Houses, Sylvain Jose Gautier
- Hero's Park, Nachi Touya

2020

- Cupid Parasite, Allan Melville
- Mr Love: Queen's Choice, Shō (Shaw)

2021

- Tsukihime -A piece of blue glass moon-, Arihiko Inui
- Alchemy Stars, Charon
- Lover Pretend, Kamikubo Kazuma

2022

- Birushana: Rising Flower of Genpei, Minamoto no Yoritomo
- even if TEMPEST, Crius Castlerock
- Fire Emblem Warriors: Three Hopes, Sylvain Jose Gautier
- River City Girls 2, Kunio
- Tengoku Struggle, Jack
- The DioField Chronicle, Shivat Malzin
- Touken Ranbu Warriors, Ookurikara
- Triangle Strategy, Exharme Marcial

2023

- Cupid Parasite -Sweet & Spicy Darling-, Allan Melville
- even if TEMPEST Dawning Connections, Crius Castlerock
- Honkai: Star Rail, Gepard Landau
- Path to Nowhere, Levy

2025

- Atelier Yumia: The Alchemist of Memories & the Envisioned Land, Viktor von Duerer
- Duet Night Abyss, Outsider

2026

- Genshin Impact, Valeriy
- Petit Planet, Mors

=== Commercials ===
- Toyota Raize (2020), Raize

=== Drama CD ===
- Golden Sparkle (2019), Gaku Asada
- Given (2016), Natsuki Kizu
- Given 2 (2017), Natsuki Kizu
- Given 3 (2018), Natsuki Kizu
- Given 4 (2018), Natsuki Kizu
- Given 5 (2019), Natsuki Kizu
- Paradox Live (2019), Yuto Inukai
- Fantastic Night (2021), Shirasu

=== Dubbing ===
- DC Super Hero Girls, Steve Trevor

== Discography (as a singer) ==
=== Singles ===
Date released	Title & track listing	UPC/product code
July 4, 2018	miserable masquerade 1. miserable masquerade 2. アンバランス (Unbalance); 3. 手紙 (Tegami); DVD version (Deluxe Edition); 1. miserable masquerade MV; 2. Making of miserable masquerade	LACM-34771 (Deluxe Edition); LACM-14771 (Regular Edition)
July 4, 2019	地図が無くても戻るから (Chizu ga Nakute mo Madorukara); 1. 地図が無くても戻るから; 2. 道化師と♠︎（sadness） (Doukeshi to♠︎（sadness）); DVD version (Deluxe Edition); 1. 地図が無くても戻るから MV; 2. Making of 地図が無くても戻るから	LACM-34875 (Deluxe Edition); LACM-14875 (Regular Edition)
May 13, 2020 (digital); July 29, 2020 (physical)	本日モ誠ニ晴天也 (Honjitsu mo Makoto ni Seiten nari); 1. 本日モ誠ニ晴天也; 2. パトスのカタチ (Pathos no Katachi); 3. 本日モ誠ニ晴天也-Instrumental-: 4. パトスのカタチ-Instrumental-; DVD version (Deluxe Edition); 1. 本日モ誠ニ晴天也 MV; 2. Making of 本日モ誠ニ晴天也	LACM-34002 (Deluxe Edition); LACM-24002 (Regular Edition)
February 16, 2022	我、薔薇に淫す (Ware, Bare ni Insu); 1. 我、薔薇に淫す; 2. first light 3. 我、薔薇に淫す-Instrumental-: 4. first light -Instrumental-; Anime Version; 1. 我、薔薇に淫す; 2. 光の回廊 (Hikari no Kairo); 3. 我、薔薇に淫す-Instrumental-: 4. 光の回廊 -Instrumental-	LACM-24241 (Artist Version); LACM-24242 (Anime Version)
June 22, 2022	荊棘輪舞曲 (Ibara Rinbukyoku); 1. 荊棘輪舞曲; 2. Onlynight Crown; 3. 薔薇輪舞曲 -Instrumental-: 4. Onlynight Crown -Instrumental-; Anime Version; 1. 荊棘輪舞曲; 2. その夜が明けるまで (Sono Yoru ga Akeru made); 3. 薔薇輪舞曲 -Instrumental-: 4. その夜が明けるまで -Instrumental-	LACM-24268 (Artist Version); LACM-24269 (Anime Version)
July 5, 2023	"Place your bets" 1. "Place your bets" 2. rainy day 3. "Place your bets" -Instrumental-: 4. rainy day -Instrumental-; DVD version (Deluxe Edition); 1. "Place your bets"-MUSIC VIDEO-: 2. MAKING of "Place your bets"	LACM-34394 (Deluxe Edition); LACM-24394 (Regular Edition)
June 12, 2024	カレイドスコープ (Kaleidoscope); 1. カレイドスコープ; 2. マーガレットの沈黙 (Margaret no Chinmoku); 3. カレイドスコープ – Instrumental -: 4. マーガレットの沈黙 – Instrumental -; Limited Edition Version A 1. カレイドスコープ; 2. Like a sunflower 3. カレイドスコープ – Instrumental -: 4. Like a sunflower – Instrumental -; Limited Edition Version B 1. カレイドスコープ; 2. incomplete 3. カレイドスコープ – Instrumental -: 4. incomplete – Instrumental -	LACM-34583/4 (Limited Editions); LACM-24583 (Regular Edition)

=== Albums ===
Date released	Title & track listing	UPC/product code
December 23, 2020	from fairytale 1.Overture -Act 1-: 2. 切嵌とfairytale (Kiriba to fairytale); 3. 道化師と♠︎（sadness） (Doukeshi to♠︎（sadness）); 4. miserable masquerade -Re:andante-; 5. スピカ (Spica); 6.地図が無くても戻るから (Chizu ga Nakute mo Madorukara); 7. Interlude -Act 2-; 8. 気ままに見えるかい？ (Kimama ni Mieru kai？); 9. パトスのカタチ (Pathos no Katachi); 10. 愚者の跳躍 (Gusha no Chouyaku); 11. 本日モ誠ニ晴天也 (Honjitsu mo Makoto ni Seiten nari); 12. 勝鬨 (Kachidoki); 13. for fairytale	LACA-35851 (Deluxe Edition); LACA-15851 (Regular Edition)
November 17, 2021	ROOM Of No Name; 1.Forsaken kiss 2. 灰硝子 (Hai Garasu); 3. 揺籠とクローバー (Yurikago to Clover); 4. 夕凪を連れて (Yūnagi wo Tsurete); 5. Craving	LACA-35914 (Deluxe Edition); LACA-15914 (Regular Edition)
June 18, 2025	Catch Me If You Can; 1. 口づけは Signed piece (Kuchizuke wa Signed piece); 2. Catch Me If You Can; 3. Hightail it 4. 嘘と月光 (Uso to Gekkou); 5. 白夜のLullaby (Byakuya no Lullaby)	LACA-35157 (Deluxe Edition); LACA-25157 (Regular Edition); LACZ-10291 (Limited Print Edition
