= Over Requiemz =

OVER REQUIEMZ
- Developer: Kogado Studio
- Publishers: JP: Otomate; WW: Aksys Games
- Director: Hiroko Hosoya
- Producer: Shingo Kuwana
- Artist: Kazeta Tayu
- Platform: Nintendo Switch
- Release: JP: April 17, 2025; WW: August 20, 2026
- Genres: Visual novel Otome game

Over Requiemz (styled in all caps) is a Japanese otome game developed by Kogado Studio and published by Idea Factory's Otomate brand.

== Plot ==
After a tornado, high school student Yuhiru ends up transported the Kingdom of Oz, which is ruled by four witches and one king. Because of her black eyes and hair (which are taboos in Oz), she is sentenced to death. However, her sentence is delayed on the condition she goes on a journey with four men on death row and their mysterious supervisor.

The game can diverge into two routes: the Fact Route (also known as the Truth Path), where Yuhiru helps her selected love interest heal from their trauma, and the Dark Route (also known as the Obsession Path), involving much darker, psychological, and yandere themes.

== Characters ==
Yuhiru (ユヒル, Yuhiru)
A high school student who wandered into the Land of Oz. Because of her black eyes and black hair, she is imprisoned as "demon-possessed." She confronts this unreasonable situation with resilience and mental strength.

Kaize Ozma (カイゼ・オズマ, Kaize Ozuma)
Voiced by Yohei Azakami
A prince feared as "demon-possessed" who spreads curses. Easily misunderstood due to his cold smile, but he is a shy person who cares about others. He killed his own father, the king, with his own hands.

Claude Grain (クロード・グレイン, Kurōdo Gurein)
Voiced by Makoto Furukawa
A researcher of ruins who was expelled from the Royal Society. He is caring, knowledgeable, and has gone through many hardships. He tends to keep his inner feelings to himself and not show them to others. He brutally slaughtered all the villagers of his hometown, including his family.

Molly Woodland (モリィ・ウッドランド, Morī Uddorando)
Voiced by Kaito Ishikawa
A mysterious undertaker. A young undertaker who never loses his smile even when looking at corpses. He is as beautiful and ephemeral as a fairy tale prince. For some reason, he is good at escaping from ropes and picking locks. It is said that he attacked a group of traveling merchants on the highway.

Noil Bestia (ノイル・ベスティア, Noiru Besutia)
Voiced by Ryota Suzuki
A rough, delinquent knight. A knight belonging to the Kingdom's Order of Knights, notorious as a troublemaker. Though crude and unconventional, he is honest and faithful to his duties. A warrior who values pride. He is said to have massacred the knights of the platoon he led.

Dorothy (ドロシー, Doroshī)
Voiced by Shun Horie
The politely rude Witch of the North. One of the government officials called "Witches," who accompanies them to monitor the sinners. He is lazy and irresponsible. For some reason, he is overprotective of the heroine. He dabbles in medicine.

Ackley (アクレイ, Akurei)
Voiced by Tasuku Akiba
The king-killing demon. An existence called a "demon" that is supposed to exist only in legends. He harbors an endless hatred toward the royal family.

Nenos Urau (ネノス・ウラウ, Nenosu Urau)
Voiced by Shinnosuke Tokudome
A young man close to madness. He became the Witch of the East at a young age due to his highly valued intellect. He has a tendency to look down on others and act selfishly.

Osser Woodland (オッサー・ウッドランド, Ossā Uddorando)
Voiced by Toshiki Iwasawa
An aloof tactician. The Witch of the West, who appears slovenly but is highly sharp-witted. He elusively drifts through life, never letting anyone read his true intentions.

Glinda Ferris (グリンダ・フェリス, Gurinda Ferisu)
Voiced by Natsumi Fujiwara
A noble Knight Commander. The Commander of the Kingdom's Order of Knights and the Witch of the South. A serious and earnest individual who takes pride in protecting the people.

Eugene Pulpo (ユージン・プルポ, Yūjin Purupo)
Voiced by Alban Shibata
A missing knight. A knight belonging to the Kingdom's Order of Knights. He is skilled, but tends to compare himself to others.

== Game ==
The game was announced on August 17, 2024, at the Otomate Party 2024, alongside a teaser announcing its production. On September 14, 2024, the game's official website was launched, containing information regarding the game. The release date was officially announced by Idea Factory on November 20, 2024. On December 12, 2024, the game's opening theme, Muted Expectations, sung by the singer Hisano, was officially released. On January 23, 2025, a promotional video for the game was released. In March 2025, Otomate released a set of videos showcasing the gameplay. On April 17, 2025, the game was officially released for the Nintendo Switch. The ending song, Tsubasa o Hirogeta Hekuiemu (翼を広げたレクイエム; lit. 'Requiem with outstretched wings') is sung by Hisano.

Aksys Games announced via their blog that they were going to release the game in English. The game was released in English on August 20, 2026.

== Reception ==
Famitsu reported that from April 14, 2025 to April 20, 2025, OVER REQUIMEZ ranked first place in physical purchases, with 7,286 copies sold.

Jenni Lada found the game to be different from the typical otome games, calling it "freeform." She wrote amount of freedom the player is given to play the main character in any way that they like, and to get to know the love interests better. She noted there are "few choices are the ones that matter," that the important choices are highlighted, which can allow the player to save as they wish. Lada stated that the routes of the game were only focused on the chosen love interest, with little insight into others, advising to save Dorothy's route for last, calling it "quite fascinating and well-written." She further noted that there were times were romance didn't feel like a priority, and was instead replaced with more dark and traumatic elements. However, she also warned about the dark routes of the game (specifically Molly's), listing that "violence, possessiveness, and general red flag, toxic behavior" is prevalent in the game.
