= Otome game =

Story-based video game for women

An otome game (Note: English: /ˈoʊtoʊmeɪ/) (Japanese: 乙女ゲーム, Hepburn: otome gēmu; lit. "maiden game") is a story-based romance video game targeted towards women, in which the player plays as the female protagonist or experiences the story from the perspective of a fully characterized female protagonist while making choices for her. Generally one of the goals, besides the main story goal, is to develop a romantic relationship between the female main player character and one of the secondary lead characters, who are male.

== History ==
The term "otome game" was not created upon the release of the first Angelique game in 1994. At the time of its launch, game developers had not yet coined the term, and early official promotional materials instead referred to Angelique as a "Neo Romance game". The term "otome game" did not emerge until late 2001 to around 2002, originating from the interactive ecosystem between print media and their readership. In the interactive sections—such as reader surveys, letters, and dōjinshi submissions—of gaming and anime magazines like Dengeki G's Magazine and B's-LOG, female players grew accustomed to using the word "otome" (maiden) to self-identify their demographic. To foster a closer relationship with their audience and strengthen commercial ties, publishers and game developers adopted this term, which initially described the "players behind the screen," and repurposed it as a definitive label for the genre itself.

The first otome game is generally acknowledged to be Angelique, released in 1994 by Koei in Japan for the Super Famicom, and created by Ruby Party, an all-woman development team division of Koei. The game was originally designed for pre-teen and younger teenage girls, but became unexpectedly popular with older teenagers and women in their 20s. In 2021, the series continues with Angelique Luminarise, in which the protagonist is a 25-year-old office worker. Angelique is credited with "set[ting] up the specifics and conventions of women's games: a focus on romance, easy controls and utilizing other multimedia." In 1997 the second otome game, Albaria no Otome was released by Gimmick House and Magical Craft for PC-FX and later for PlayStation. The game has a very similar dynamic to its predecessor Angelique, with the protagonist Ashanty, a young woman who will have to choose between being the new sacred protector of a kingdom, or falling in love and living happily with one of her knights who will help her during the game. In 2002, Konami released its very successful Tokimeki Memorial Girl's Side, which brought many new fans to the still-new genre. In 2006, Famitsu's listings for the Top 20 selling love games included seven otome games. Early games borrowed heavily from the iconography and story conventions of "retro shoujo manga", "the archetypical girly heroines, the emphasis on pure, sexless, tranquil romance and on a peaceful, stable setting", but as the category expanded, other narrative and gameplay elements were introduced, including action, adventure, combat and plots in which "the heroine can 'save the world' and 'get the guy' at the same time".

The first Japanese otome game to be officially translated and sold in English was the visual novel Yo-Jin-Bo in 2006 for the PC.

In 2024, the otome game Love and Deepspace, published by Infold Games, was noted for its use of more realistic 3D graphics.

Some publications that regularly cover otome games include B's LOG and Dengeki Girl's Style.

== Style ==
The genre has many style elements in common with shōjo manga and josei manga, and plotwise they are often similar to harem manga.

Otome games that are released on console and handheld platforms contain no pornographic content, as companies such as Sony and Nintendo do not allow it. There are games released on a PC platform which are rated 18+ for their sexual content. Some games were originally released for the PC with pornographic content, and were later toned down and re-released for game consoles.

Other common elements in otome games are the importance of voice acting, CG stills, and a small epilogue or set scene at the end of the game when a character is successfully finished.

== Characteristics ==
=== Gameplay ===
Traditionally, the goal of these games is to have the desired partner fall in love and have a relationship with the player character, but the requirements for gaining a "good end" differ from game to game. While the plots of otome games differ greatly, there is usually a single female main character, and several good-looking males of varying "types".

Gameplay occasionally does not particularly focus on romance, even if there are several characters whose "routes" can be followed.

In the visual novel examples of the genre, the player proceeds in the story by selecting dialogue or action choices which affect their relationships in a decision tree format. In simulation otome games, there is also other gameplay which affects the plot, either by playing minigames or by raising stats. The main character often has several parameters, such as looks, style, intelligence, talent, etc., that can be raised through various activities in normal gameplay. The potential partners usually require a certain parameter or parameters to be at a certain level for them to fall in love with the main character. There is also often a pure dating aspect of gameplay in simulations. This involves asking or being asked on dates by the love interest, doing an activity with them, and responding to their questions or comments. The player has a choice of responses, and a correct answer will raise your standing with that character.

One feature that has become common in otome games is "full voice" (フルボイス, furu boisu), which is to have voice acting throughout the entire game. The love interests are often voiced by well-known voice actors. At certain points, or when the player passes certain requirements, special events can occur, often with a "CG" (computer graphic) as a reward. This CG is a set picture featuring the love interest and sometimes the main character in a pose, and some dialogue.

Most otome games' heroines are not voiced, due to the budget concerns of voicing all their dialogue. However, there are some games featuring fully voiced heroines, such as Norn9 or Haruka: Beyond the Stream of Time.

=== Representation of women ===
In otome games, the main female character is generally categorized as either self-insert or non-self-insert. Self-insert does not have personality and backstory, giving players space to insert themselves into the game. In contrast, the non-self-insert main character has a more vivid personality and detailed story, whose characteristics do not depend on the player for existence.

However, in either case, the main character in most otome games has a fixed image. Usually, the game unfolds from the protagonist's first point of view.

In general, it is difficult to represent the female protagonist in simple terms, because the game character as an avatar of the player is ambiguous and complex, a state where subject and object coexist: they are both the player's "shoes" and admirable icon.

=== Representation of men ===
The main men characters who can develop a romantic relationship with vary from game to game. In general, however, the appearances of main male characters who can develop romantic relationships are conventionally handsome and attractive.

Typical male character archetypes in otome games include international tropes like the childhood friend, and anime-specific ones such as the tsundere.

== Other media adaptation ==
=== Manga ===
Otome games have strong links with shōjo manga, with popular titles often spawning a manga series (e.g. Neo Angelique and Meine Liebe), and popular manga series getting adapted to videogames (such as Nana). Some examples of simultaneous releases of a manga and otome game also exist, such as Angelique and Full House Kiss. It's also common to find dōjinshi featuring popular characters from otome games.

=== Anime ===
Some popular games have also been adapted to anime, OVAs, or series, such as Angelique, Diabolik Lovers and Uta no Prince-sama.

== Notable otome games ==
- 7'scarlet
- 9 R.I.P.
- Alice in the Country of Hearts (series)
- Amnesia (series)
- Angelique (series)
- Arabians Lost: The Engagement on Desert
- Bad Apple Wars
- Birushana (series)
- Brothers Conflict (series)
- Bustafellows
- Café 0 ~The Drowned Mermaid~
- Charade Maniacs
- Code: Realize
- Collar × Malice
- Cupid Parasite
- Dance with Devils (series)
- Diabolik Lovers (series)
- Duel Love
- Edel Blume
- Even If Tempest
- Full House Kiss (series)
- Hakuōki (series)
- Harukanaru Toki no Naka de (series)
- Hatoful Boyfriend
- Heileen (developed in Italy)
- Hiiro no Kakera (series)
- Homura: The Crimson Warriors
- Ikemen Sengoku
- Jack Jeanne
- Kiniro no Corda (La Corda d'Oro) (series)
- La storia della Arcana Famiglia (series)
- Last Escort (series)
- Love and Deepspace
- Lover Pretend
- Magic-kyun! Renaissance (series)
- Meine Liebe (series)
- Mistonia's Hope: The Lost Delight
- Mr Love: Queen's Choice
- Mystic Messenger
- Norn9
- Otometeki Koi Kakumei Love Revo!!
- Over Requiemz
- Palais de Reine
- Piofiore: Fated Memories
- Princess Debut
- Reine des Fleurs
- Starry Sky (series)
- Sympathy Kiss
- Taisho × Alice
- Tears of Themis
- Tokimeki Memorial Girl's Side (series)
- Ururun Quest: Koiyuuki
- Uta no Prince-sama (series)
- Vitamin (series)
- Virche Evermore: Error: Salvation
- Yo-Jin-Bo
- Your Memories Off: Girl's Style

== Notable otome game developers and publishers ==
- Aksys Games
- Broccoli
- D3 Publisher
- GREE
- Hanako Games
- HuneX
- Idea Factory (Otomate)
- Koei Tecmo (Ruby Party)
- Konami
- Mangagamer
- QuinRose
- Rejet
- sakevisual
- Sunsoft
- Voltage
- Winter Wolves

== See also ==
- Otomechikku, a genre of manga
