= Blue Orchestra =

Japanese manga series

- First tankōbon volume cover, featuring Hajime Aono

青のオーケストラ (Ao no Ōkesutora)
- Genre: Coming-of-age; Drama; Music
- Manga
- Written by: Makoto Akui
- Published by: Shogakukan
- Imprint: Ura Sunday Comics
- Magazine: Ura Sunday; MangaONE
- Original run: April 25, 2017 – present
- Volumes: 16
- Anime television series
- Directed by: Seiji Kishi
- Written by: Yūko Kakihara
- Music by: Akira Kosemura
- Studio: Nippon Animation
- Licensed by: SEA: Plus Media Networks Asia
- Original network: NHK Educational TV
- Original run: April 9, 2023 – March 1, 2026
- Episodes: 45
- icon

Blue Orchestra (Japanese: 青のオーケストラ, Hepburn: Ao no Ōkesutora) is a Japanese web manga series written and illustrated by Makoto Akui. It has been serialized in Shogakukan's Ura Sunday website and MangaONE app since April 2017. An anime television series adaptation produced by Nippon Animation aired from April to October 2023. A second season aired from October 2025 to March 2026.

By December 2021, the Blue Orchestra manga had over 3.3 million copies in circulation. In 2023, the manga won the 68th Shogakukan Manga Award for the shōnen category.

== Plot ==
Hajime Aono, a boy who loved to play his violin and one who used to win many prizes in violin competitions, had greatly admired his father a professional violinist. After a bittersweet divorce of his parents, caused by headlines of his father's scandalous affair, Hajime swears to never touch the violin again. In his last year of middle school, Hajime comes across an aspiring violinist Ritsuko Akine, who loves to play in the infirmary. After meeting a few times, and Hajime showing interest in her 'horrible' playing skills, he is set up to teach her by a teacher. This teacher later pushes him to regain his talent by joining the orchestra club at a prestigious high school, which have won national competitions eight years in a row. Once persuaded, Hajime and Ritsuko manage to get accepted to this prestigious school after diligently studying. After his opening ceremony into high school where the orchestra club gave a performance, he has a look around the orchestra club along with Ritsuko where he meets Nao Saeki, a violin genius who has achieved the top score in many competitions and was admitted to the school purely on musical talent. From there on, they compete in their violin skills within the orchestra club.

== Characters ==
Hajime Aono (青野 一, Aono Hajime)
Voiced by: Shōya Chiba
Hajime's violin performances are performed by Ryota Higashi.
Ritsuko Akine (秋音 律子, Akine Ritsuko)
Voiced by: Ai Kakuma
Ritsuko's violin performances are performed by Yurie Yamada.
Nao Saeki (佐伯 直, Saeki Nao)
Voiced by: Shimba Tsuchiya
Nao's violin performances are performed by Takuto Owari.
Haru Kozakura (小桜 ハル, Kozakura Haru)
Voiced by: Minako Satō
Haru's violin performances are performed by Kyoko Ogawa.
Ichirō Yamada (山田 一郎, Yamada Ichirō)
Voiced by: Makoto Furukawa
Ichirō's cello performances are performed by Harumi Sato.
Shizuka Tachibana (立花 静, Tachibana Shizuka)
Voiced by: Lynn
Shizuka's violin performances are performed by Karen Kido.
Yō Hatori (羽鳥 葉, Hatori Yō)
Voiced by: Shintarō Asanuma
Yō's violin performances are performed by Tomotaka Seki.
Sō Harada (原田 蒼, Harada Sō)
Voiced by: Junya Enoki
Sō's violin performances are performed by María Dueñas.
Ryūjin Aono (青野 龍仁, Aono Ryūjin)
Voiced by: Ryōtarō Okiayu
Ryūjin's violin performances are performed by Hilary Hahn.
Mari Tateishi (立石 真理, Tateishi Mari)
Voiced by: Konomi Kohara
Chika Yonezawa (米沢 千佳, Yonezawa Chika)
Voiced by: Kaori Maeda
Osamu Shibata (柴田 修, Shibata Osamu)
Voiced by: Jun Fukushima
Hajime's mother (青野の母, Aono no Haha)
Voiced by: Chiwa Saitō
Takeda-sensei (武田先生)
Voiced by: Hayato Kaneko
Hiroaki Ayukawa (鮎川 広明, Ayukawa Hiroaki)
Voiced by: Daisuke Ono
Mizuki Machii (町井 美月, Machii Mizuki)
Voiced by: Chika Anzai
Tsubasa Takahashi (高橋 翼, Takahashi Tsubasa)
Voiced by: Ruriko Aoki
Takami Kimura (木村 隆美, Kimura Takami)
Voiced by: Hisako Kanemoto
Himeko Susono (裾野 姫子, Susono Himeko)
Voiced by: Mai Kanazawa
Kayo Takimoto (滝本 かよ, Takimoto Kayo)
Voiced by: Mai Fuchigami
Sanae Iida (飯田 早苗, Iida Sanae)
Voiced by: Rumi Okubo
Tsutomu Kikuchi (菊池 努, Kikuchi Tsutomu)
Voiced by: Takahiro Mizushima
Yūsuke Sakuma (佐久間 優介, Sakuma Yūsuke)
Voiced by: Hiroshi Kamiya
Toshiki Tsutsui (筒井 俊樹, Tsutsui Toshiki)
Voiced by: Makoto Kaneko
Rika Tōgane (東金 梨香, Tōgane Rika)
Voiced by: Iori Saeki

== Media ==
=== Manga ===
Written and illustrated by Makoto Akui, Blue Orchestra started in Shogakukan's MangaONE app on April 25, 2017; it also started in Shogakukan's Ura Sunday website a week later on May 2. Shogakukan has collected its chapters into individual tankōbon volumes. The first volume was released on July 19, 2017. As of November 18, 2026, 16 volumes have been released.

Elex Media Komputindo has licensed the manga in Indonesia since 2019.

==== Volumes ====
No.	Release date	ISBN
1	July 19, 2017	978-4-09-127744-2
2	November 10, 2017	978-4-09-128019-0
3	May 11, 2018	978-4-09-128295-8
4	September 12, 2018	978-4-09-128517-1
5	January 18, 2019	978-4-09-128757-1
6	August 8, 2019	978-4-09-129378-7
7	May 12, 2020	978-4-09-850113-7
8	September 11, 2020	978-4-09-850239-4
9	April 19, 2021	978-4-09-850506-7
10	April 19, 2022	978-4-09-851078-8
11	March 31, 2023	978-4-09-851759-6
12	March 12, 2025	978-4-09-854033-4
13	October 17, 2025	978-4-09-854284-0
14	February 19, 2026	978-4-09-854428-8
15	April 10, 2026	978-4-09-854516-2
16	November 18, 2026	978-4-09-854892-7

=== Anime ===
In April 2022, an anime television series adaptation was announced. It is produced by Nippon Animation and directed by Seiji Kishi, with series composition by Yūko Kakihara, character designs handled by Kazuaki Morita, and violinist performances for the character Hajime Aono by Ryota Higashi. The series aired from April 9 to October 8, 2023, on NHK Educational TV. The opening theme song is "Cantabile", performed by Novelbright, while the ending theme song is "Yūsari no Canon" (夕さりのカノン, Yūsari no Kanon), performed by Yuika.

Following the final episode of the first season, a second season was announced to be in production. The season aired from October 5, 2025, to March 1, 2026. The opening theme song is "Amadeus" (アマデウス, Amadeusu), performed by Galileo Galilei, while the ending theme song is "Ao no Mahō" (青の魔法; lit. 'Blue Magic'), performed by ChoQMay.

Plus Media Networks Asia licensed the series in Southeast Asia for simulcast release on Aniplus Asia.

==== Episodes ====
===== Season 1 (2023) =====
No. overall	No. in season	Title	Directed by (Note: Production staff information is taken from the ending credits of each episode.)	Written by	Storyboarded by	Original release date
1	1	"Hajime Aono"; Transliteration: "Aono Hajime" (Japanese: 青野ハジメ)	Jinya Ichimura	Yūko Kakihara	Seiji Kishi, Kunpei Maeda & Takahiro Tanaka	April 9, 2023
2	2	"Ritsuko Akine"; Transliteration: "Akine Ritsuko" (Japanese: 秋音律子)	Kunpei Maeda	Yūko Kakihara	Kunpei Maeda	April 16, 2023
3	3	"Umimaku High Orchestra Club"; Transliteration: "Umimaku Kōkō Ōkesutora-bu" (Japanese: 海幕高校オーケストラ部)	Shigeki Awai	Yūko Kakihara	Jun Kamiya	April 23, 2023
4	4	"Nao Saeki" (Japanese: 佐伯直)	Masanori Miyata	Yūko Kakihara	Takahiro Tanaka	April 30, 2023
5	5	"So Harada" (Japanese: 原田蒼)	Jinya Ichimura	Yūko Kakihara	Kunpei Maeda	May 7, 2023
6	6	"Rainy Day"; Transliteration: "Ame no Hi" (Japanese: 雨の日)	Shigeki Awai	Yūko Kakihara	Jun Kamita	May 14, 2023
7	7	"Haru Kozakura" (Japanese: 小桜ハル)	Hiroto Miyagi	Yūko Kakihara	Jinya Ichimura	May 21, 2023
8	8	"Aria on the G String"; Transliteration: "G-senjō no Aria" (Japanese: G線上のアリア)	Takahiro Tanaka	Yūko Kakihara	Jun Kamiya	May 28, 2023
9	9	"Senior"; Transliteration: "Senpai" (Japanese: 先輩)	Kaoru Suzumura	Yūko Kakihara	Kunpei Maeda, Jun Kamiya & Jinya Ichimura	June 4, 2023
10	10	"Beginners and the Experienced"; Transliteration: "Shoshinsha to Keikensha" (Japanese: 初心者と経験者)	Eigetsu	Yūko Kakihara	Takahiro Tanaka	June 11, 2023
11	11	"Eve of the Showdown"; Transliteration: "Kessen Zenya" (Japanese: 決戦前夜)	Takuro Suzuki	Yuki Ikeda	Jun Kamiya	June 18, 2023
12	12	"Audition"; Transliteration: "Odishon" (Japanese: オーディション)	Koichiro Kuroda & Mao Yingxing	Mikiko Takahashi	Yasuhiro Irie	June 25, 2023
13	13	"My Own Tone"; Transliteration: "Jibun no Neiro" (Japanese: 自分の音色)	Jinya Ichimura	Mikiko Takahashi	Jinya Ichimura	July 2, 2023
14	14	"Compromise"; Transliteration: "Ayumiyoru" (Japanese: 歩み寄る)	Takahiro Tanaka	Yuki Ikeda	Yuji Moriyama	July 9, 2023
15	15	"True Feelings"; Transliteration: "Honne" (Japanese: 本音)	Kunpei Maeda	Yuki Ikeda	Takahiro Tanaka	July 16, 2023
16	16	"Worry"; Transliteration: "Shinpai" (Japanese: 心配)	Yoshihiro Mori and Mao Yingxing	Yūko Kakihara	Jun Kamiya	July 23, 2023
17	17	"More True Feelings"; Transliteration: "Mō Hitotsu no Honne" (Japanese: もう一つの本音)	Teppei Takeya	Yūko Kakihara	Hiroatsu Agata & Masayoshi Nishida	July 30, 2023
18	18	"Truth"; Transliteration: "Shinjitsu" (Japanese: 真実)	Ryouhei Endou and Mao Yingxing	Yūko Kakihara	Kunpei Maeda	August 27, 2023
19	19	"As Yourself"; Transliteration: "Kimi to Shite" (Japanese: 君として)	Takuro Suzuki	Yūko Kakihara	Takuro Suzuki	September 3, 2023
20	20	"Summer Location"; Transliteration: "Natsu no Ibasho" (Japanese: 夏の居場所)	Teppei Takiya	Mikiko Takahashi	Takahiro Tanaka	September 10, 2023
21	21	"Humoresque"; Transliteration: "Yūmoresuku" (Japanese: ユーモレスク)	Jinya Ichimura and Jun Kamiya	Mikiko Takahashi	Jinya Ichimura and Jun Kamiya	September 17, 2023
22	22	"Words to Give"; Transliteration: "Okuru Kotoba" (Japanese: 贈る言葉)	Ryouhei Endou	Yuki Ikeda	Tomomi Umezu	September 24, 2023
23	23	"The Regular Concert"; Transliteration: "Teiki Ensōkai" (Japanese: 定期演奏会)	Kunpei Maeda	Yūko Kakihara	Jun Kamiya and Jinya Ichimura	October 1, 2023
24	24	"From the New World"; Transliteration: "Shin Sekai Yori" (Japanese: 新世界より)	Kunpei Maeda and Takuro Suzuki	Yūko Kakihara	Kunpei Maeda and Takuro Suzuki	October 8, 2023

===== Season 2 (2025–2026) =====
No. overall	No. in season	Title	Directed by	Storyboarded by	Original release date
25	1	"Coming Apart"; Transliteration: "Hokorobi" (Japanese: ほころび)	Kunpei Maeda	Kunpei Maeda	October 5, 2025
26	2	"Ripples"; Transliteration: "Hamon" (Japanese: 波紋)	Ryosuke Niwa	Teppei Takeya	October 12, 2025
27	3	"Responsibility"; Transliteration: "Kejime" (Japanese: ケジメ)	Sai Ingai	Jun Kamiya	October 19, 2025
28	4	"Sports Day"; Transliteration: "Taiiku Matsuri" (Japanese: 体育祭)	Sumito Sasaki	Yoshimichi Hirai	October 26, 2025
29	5	"Issues"; Transliteration: "Kadai" (Japanese: 課題)	Toshihiro Nagao	Takuro Suzuki	November 2, 2025
30	6	"Regret and Progress"; Transliteration: "Kōkai to Ippo" (Japanese: 後悔と一歩)	Sumito Sasaki	Susumu Nishizawa	November 9, 2025
31	7	"Anger"; Transliteration: "Ikari" (Japanese: 怒り)	Takuro Suzuki	Takuro Suzuki	November 16, 2025
32	8	"Competition"; Transliteration: "Konkūru" (Japanese: コンクール)	Miyagi Hiroto	Takuro Suzuki	November 23, 2025
33	9	"Bacchanale"; Transliteration: "Bakkanāru" (Japanese: バッカナール)	Yoshimichi Hirai	Yoshimichi Hirai	November 30, 2025
34	10	"Identity"; Transliteration: "Rashisa" (Japanese: らしさ)	Kunpei Maeda	Kunpei Maeda	December 7, 2025
35	11	"Present"; Transliteration: "Purezento" (Japanese: プレゼント)	Kamadon	Susumu Nishizawa	December 14, 2025
36	12	"Choir"; Transliteration: "Gasshō" (Japanese: 合唱)	Hisato Shimoda	Romanov Higa	December 21, 2025
37	13	"Morning Mist"; Transliteration: "Asagiri" (Japanese: 朝霧)	Koji Kanzaki	Jun Kamiya	January 4, 2026
38	14	"Christmas Concert"; Transliteration: "Kurisumasu Konsāto" (Japanese: クリスマスコンサート)	Yoshihiro Ito	Romanov Higa	January 11, 2026
39	15	"New Scenery"; Transliteration: "Atarashii Keshiki" (Japanese: 新しい景色)	Sota Kono	Takuro Suzuki	January 18, 2026
40	16	"Genroku Iwatora"; Transliteration: "Iwatora Genroku" (Japanese: 巌虎玄六)	Daniel Ryusei	Susumu Nishizawa	January 25, 2026
41	17	"A Distinguished Father"; Transliteration: "Idai na Chichi" (Japanese: 偉大な父)	Koji Kanzaki	Kunpei Maeda	February 1, 2026
42	18	"Respective Signs"; Transliteration: "Sorezore no Kizashi" (Japanese: それぞれの兆し)	Takuro Suzuki	Takuro Suzuki	February 8, 2026
43	19	"True Nature"; Transliteration: "Honshō" (Japanese: 本性)	Daniel Ryusei	Jun Kamiya and Romanov Higa	February 15, 2026
44	20	"Surpass"; Transliteration: "Koeru" (Japanese: 超える)	Masato Miyoshi	Jinya Ichimura & Sophia Halfyard	February 22, 2026
45	21	"Graduation"; Transliteration: "Sotsugyō" (Japanese: 卒業)	Takuro Suzuki	Takuro Suzuki	March 1, 2026

=== Other media ===
A promotional video featuring Star Wars musical theme "The Imperial March", composed by John Williams, and including illustrations from the manga, was uploaded by Deutsche Grammophon's YouTube channel on May 4, 2022, to celebrate Star Wars Day and Williams' 90th birthday.

== Reception ==
By December 2021, the manga had over 3.3 million copies in circulation. In 2023, Blue Orchestra won the 68th Shogakukan Manga Award in the shōnen category, along with Call of the Night.
