= Last Escort =

Video game series

- Cover of the standard edition of Last Escort: Shinya no Kokuchou Monogatari

ラスト・エスコート (Rasuto Esuko-to)
- Genre: Otome, Romance, simulation
- Video game

Last Escort: Shinya no Kokuchou Monogatari (ラスト・エスコート～深夜の黒蝶物語～)
- Publisher: D3 Publisher
- Genre: Otome, dating sim, visual novel
- Platform: PlayStation 2
- Released: JP: January 26, 2006
- Video game

Last Escort: Kokuchou Special Night (ラスト・エスコート~黒蝶スペシャルナイト~)
- Publisher: D3 Publisher
- Genre: Otome, dating sim, visual novel
- Platform: PlayStation 2
- Released: JP: July 27, 2006
- Video game

Last Escort 2: Shinya no Amai Toge (ラスト・エスコート 2 ~深夜の甘い棘~)
- Publisher: D3 Publisher
- Genre: Otome, dating sim, visual novel
- Platform: PlayStation 2
- Released: JP: February 21, 2008
- Video game

Last Escort: Club Katze (ラストエスコート -Club Katze-)
- Publisher: D3 Publisher
- Genre: Otome, dating sim, visual novel
- Platform: PlayStation 2, PlayStation Portable
- Released: JP: February 18, 2010
- Video game

Mune Kyun Otome Collection Vol. 4: Last Escort: Club Katze (胸キュン乙女コレクション Vol.4 Last Escort -Club Katze-)
- Publisher: D3 Publisher
- Genre: Otome, dating sim, visual novel
- Platform: PlayStation Portable
- Released: JP: July 31, 2014

Last Escort is a series of host club-themed otome games by D3 Publisher for PlayStation 2 and PlayStation Portable.

== History ==
The first title was announced at Tokyo Game Show 2005 with a list price of 5040 yen, scheduled for a winter 2005 release. On August 6, 2006, D3 Publisher held an event, Twinkle Date~Ii Ase Kakouze-Natsu!~, featuring the voice actors from Last Escort, along with those of one of D3's other otome games, Bakumatsu Renka Shinsengumi. Merchandise for both series was sold at the event, and a corresponding DVD was released on October 20, 2006.

A web game spinoff optimized for mobile phones of the time, titled Last Escort ~Koisuru Mobile~, was released on January 26, 2006, and playable through a subscription to D3 Publisher's "Kochira Mune Kyun Otome" service, which cost 315 yen monthly. In order to play the game, an email address which is displayed in the PS2 game was required. A trial version was also published. The game is no longer available.

In 2010, Last Escort: Club Katze was the first multi-platform release in the series. An exclusive event limited to Mune Kyun Club members was held that same year with voice actors from the game, called Last Escort: Real Katze.

In a 2018 interview, voice actor Yūto Suzuki expressed interest in creating a VR installment of the Last Escort series.

== Last Escort: Shinya no Kokuchou Monogatari ==
=== Plot ===
Main character Akari Sagami has lived a meandering lifestyle ever since she graduated high school. However, one day, her father tells her, "If you're not interested in getting married, you need to get a part time job", so she must get a part-time job. As Akari goes out on the town in search of part-time work, she witnesses someone who seems to be her former high school classmate Yuichiro Kashimiya walking with a flamboyant woman. She loses sight of him on that day, but in the following days sees him once more. She follows him, arriving at the host club Akari's parents manage, which is scheduled to close down - Gorgeous.

== Last Escort 2: Shinya no Amai Toge ==
This is a computer game sequel to Last Escort. When the player has played the previous title, and there is save data with Chihiro's ending cleared, the player can then enjoy "Special Story", which shows a continuation of the storyline with Chihiro.

=== Plot ===
After graduating from college, Serika Andou works as an editor for a fashion magazine. One day, she meets Reiji, who lives in the same apartment building, in a state of starvation to the point he cannot move. Afterwards, invited by a senior at work, Serika visits host club Gorgeous and meets Reiji working as a host, which changes her lifestyle.

== Last Escort: Club Katze ==
=== Characters ===
Tsubasa (つばさ)
Age 23 with a cat-like, capricious personality. He works at his own pace and finds the women who go to host clubs confusing.
Voice actor: Shinnosuke Tachibana
Asato (亞沙斗)
At age 20, he is the newest host at Club Katze. He has a tall sense of pride and tends to get lonely.
Voice actor: Atsushi Abe
Rei (レイ)
Age 28, he is Club Katze's No.2 host. He pays attention to things Ryuusei overlooks. While initially reserved, he becomes dominant after getting to know him, and he bullies girls he likes.
Voice actor: Yuichi Nakamura
Ryusei (流聖)
At age 30, he is Club Katze's No.1 host, who is very trusted by his colleagues. Although he is a dandy, he may sometimes drop the pretense. He treats customers as if they were his little sister.
Voice actor: Masaki Terasoma
Kanade (奏)
Age 21. He has a feminine appearance and becomes embarrassed and blushes easily. He adjusts to his customers' feelings.
Voice Actress: Mitsuki Saiga
Hiragi Sannomiya (三ノ宮柊)
Age 28, he is the owner of Club Katze. As a manager, he is firm and bold. Although he seems quiet, he is rather sadistic and will smile while teasing the people he likes.
Voice actor: Junichi Suwabe
Johann (ヨハン)
Voice actor: Noriaki Sugiyama.

== Titles ==
- Last Escort: Shinya no Kokuchou Monogatari (ラスト・エスコート～深夜の黒蝶物語～)* (PS2) January 26, 2006
- Last Escort: Kokuchou Special Night (ラスト・エスコート~黒蝶スペシャルナイト~)* (PS2) July 27, 2006
- Last Escort 2: Shinya no Amai Toge (ラスト・エスコート 2 ~深夜の甘い棘~)* (PS2) February 21, 2008 Gorgeous Version
- Last Escort: Club Katze (ラストエスコート -Club Katze-)* (PS2, PSP) February 18, 2010 with limited edition box set for both platforms.
- Mune Kyun Otome Collection Vol. 4: Last Escort: Club Katze (胸キュン乙女コレクション Vol.4 Last Escort -Club Katze-)* (PSP) July 31, 2014 A limited promotional clear file was given away with the purchase of this version, which was part of a budget series of re-released otome games.

== Drama CDs ==
- Last Escort Dokidoki Romantic Birthday CD (February 1, 2006)
- Last Escort ~Shinya no Kokuchou Monogatari~ Drama CD (February 22, 2006, KDCA-0051)
- Last Escort 2 ~Shinya no Amai Toge~ Drama CD Ai ni Yogoreta Shirobaratachi no Amai Toge(March 25, 2008, FVCG-1023)
- Last Escort 2: Drama CD ~Naze ni Shirobara? Tsuyamachi Kugatsu no Yoru no Yume~ & Character Songs (May 28, 2008, KDSD-00208)

== Soundtracks ==
- Last Escort ~Shinya no Kokuchou Monogatari~ Original Sound Track featuring AN'S ALL STARS (January 25, 2006, KDCA-0048)
- Last Escort 2 ~Shinya no Amai Toge~ OP&ED Themes Alice/Again(March 5, 2008, KDSD-00183) - Limited edition first press contains DVD
- Last Escort 2: Original Soundtrack Vol. 1 (March 5, 2008, KDSD-00183)
- Last Escort 2: Original Soundtrack Vol. 2 (April 9, 2008, KDSD-195)
- Last Escort Club Katze Original Song Best (March 17, 2010)

== Books ==
- Last Escort ~Shinya no Kokuchou Monogatari~ Official Visual Fanbook (March 30, 2006, ISBN 4757726775)
- Last Escort Anthology Comic (May 1, 2006, ISBN 4-7577-2739-9)
- Last Escort Official Anthology Comic Shinya no Champagne Call (May 31, 2006, ISBN 4-89637-234-4)
- Last Escort ~Shinya no Kokuchou Monogatari~ Comic Anthology (July 25, 2006, ISBN 9784758003346)
- Last Escort Anthology Comic 2 (July 31, 2006, ISBN 4-7577-2903-0)
- Last Escort ~Kokuchou Special Night~ Complete Guide (August 18, 2006, ISBN 4757729332)
- Last Escort 2 ~Shinya no Amai Toge~ Official Visual Fanbook (March 28, 2008, ISBN 9784757741263)
- Last Escort -Club Katze- Official Visual Fanbook (March 15, 2010, ISBN 9784047264175)
