= Takahiro Mizushima =

Japanese voice actor (born 1976)

Daichū Mizushima Takahiro Mizushima(real name/old stage name)
- 水島 大宙
- Born: June 14, 1976 (age 50); Fujisawa, Kanagawa, Japan
- Other names: TAKA; Daichū (だいちゅう)
- Occupations: Voice actor, singer
- Years active: 2000–present
- Agent: Freelance
- Notable credit(s): Shrine of the Morning Mist as Tadahiro Amatsu; Romeo × Juliet as Romeo; My Bride Is a Mermaid as Michishio Nagasumi; Angel Beats! as Takamatsu; Kokoro Connect as Taichi Yaegashi; Charlotte as Jōjirō Takajō
- Height: 173 cm (5 ft 8 in)
- Website: www.marine-e.net/sp/taka/ 水島大宙Official site

Takahiro Mizushima (水島 大宙, Mizushima Takahiro; born June 14, 1976) is a Japanese voice actor and singer. When voicing adult games, he is known as Uta Kijima (木島 宇太, Kijima Uta). After leaving the former office AXL-ONE on March 31, 2022, he changed his stage name to "Daichū Mizushima" while keeping the kanji.

== Biography ==
Mizushima is a former Japan Ground Self-Defense Force official. He entered the JGSDF Youth Technical School, a boarding school for boys, as a member of the 38th class of JGSDF students, and graduated in 1994. He has been a member of Production Baobab since around 2000, and left at the end of May 2011 to become a member of Axlone in June 2011. In 2012, he became an instructor at Axl Zero, a training school directly under the Axlone office.

In 2014, he announced the start of his music career under the name TAKA, and made his debut as a singer with his first mini-album "Reflection" in March of the same year.

== Filmography ==
=== Anime television ===
2002

- Shrine of the Morning Mist – Tadahiro Amatsu
- Crush Gear Turbo – Rudolf Steiner
- Forza! Hidemaru – Golbo
- G-On Riders – Bankara, Man (C)
- Witch Hunter Robin – Witch, Security Guard

2003

- D.N.Angel – Eliot
- Full Metal Panic! Fumoffu – Kojima
- Hikaru no Go – Chinese Pro
- Machine Robo Rescue – Moriyama
- PoPoLoCrois – Billy
- Scrapped Princess – Christopher Armalite
- Stellvia of the Universe – Kota Otoyama

2004

- Detective Conan – Rescue Workers
- Desert Punk – Wataru Suiden
- Gokusen – Kinoshita
- Papuwa – Nagoya Willow
- Mermaid Melody Pichi Pichi Pitch Pure – Rihito Amagi
- Onmyō Taisenki – Hiragi no Tobee; Ryūji Kamiya
- Phoenix – Adam
- Pocket Monsters Advanced Generation – Fū
- SD Gundam Force – Blue Doga
- This Ugly Yet Beautiful World – Takeru Takemoto

2005

- Magical Kanan – Hazuna
- Major 2nd Season – Player

2006

- Burst Ball Hit! Crash B-Daman – Kazuma Miyoshi
- Bartender – Ryū Sasakura
- Tokyo Tribes 2 – Secretary Guard
- Gakuen Heaven – Ozawa Wataru
- Girl's High – Takanori Shimotakanani

2007

- Getsumento Heiki Mina – Ryū Sasaki
- KimiKiss: Pure Rouge – Kazuki Aihara
- Romeo × Juliet – Romeo Candore De Montague
- Sayonara, Zetsubou-Sensei – Jun Kudō/Takashi
- My Bride is a Mermaid – Nagasumi Michishio
- D.Gray-man – Bob
- Tengen Toppa Gurren Lagann – Tetsukan; Guinble

2008

- Code Geass: Lelouch of the Rebellion R2 – Rolo Lamperouge
- Monochrome Factor – Momiji Tateyama
- Our Home's Fox Deity. – Noboru Takagami
- Seto no Hanayome (OVA, sequel) : Insert Song Performance ("Soshite Otoko no Michi")

2009

- Hetalia: Axis Powers – Finland
- Inazuma Eleven – Hiroto Kiyama/Gran
- Nintama Rantaro – Tomoyoshi (First)

2010

- Angel Beats! – Takamatsu
- Night Raid 1931 – Murasawa Lieutenant
- Giant Killing – Daisuke Tsubaki
- SD Gundam Sangokuden Brave Battle Warriors – Chouryou Messala
- Seikimatsu Occult Gakuin – Fumiaki Uchida
- Stitch! ~Zutto taiko no Tomodachi~ Helzdonuts, Swapper, Couple Boy, Robot

2011

- Beelzebub – Takayuki Furuichi
- Guilty Crown – Yahiro Samukawa
- High Score – Akira Shibata
- Ground Control to Psychoelectric Girl – Nakajima
- Mashiroiro Symphony – Shingo Uryū
- Nurarihyon no Mago – Amezo
- Gosick – Gideon Lesglant

2012

- Aesthetica of a Rogue Hero – Tanaka
- Busou Shinki – Rihito Rihi
- Dog Days' – Callaway Risler
- Inu x Boku SS – Ayumu Warashibe
- Inazuma Eleven GO – Hiroto Kira
- The Knight in the Area – Kouji Yakumo, Shigeo Nishijima
- Kokoro Connect – Taichi Yaegashi
- Mysterious Girlfriend X – Ogata
- Love, Election and Chocolate – Moheiji Tatsumi
- Psycho-Pass – Masatake Mido
- Sword Art Online – Thinker
- Busou Chuugakusei: Basket Army – Tomonori

2013

- Love Lab – Satoshi Nagino
- Muromi-san – Takurō Mukōjima
- Silver Spoon – Shin'ei Ōkawa
- White Album 2 – Haruki Kitahara
- Tamagotchi! – Smartotchi
- Danball Senki – Takeru Kojō
- Little Busters! – Aikawa

2014

- Hamatora: The Animation – Takahiro Ito
- Hero Bank – Ryota Arashiyama
- Jinsei – Takao Ishikawa
- The Kindaichi Case Files R – Ikuma Shimomura

2015

- Assassination Classroom – Kōtarō Takebayashi
- Charlotte – Jōjirō Takajō
- Dog Days – Callaway Risler
- Fairy Tail – Tempesta
- Ninja Slayer From Animation – Scatter
- Saekano: How to Raise a Boring Girlfriend – Naoto
- Yona of the Dawn – Cheol-Ran

2016

- Ao Oni: The Animation – Takurō
- Aokana: Four Rhythm Across the Blue – Hayato Shirase
- Assassination Classroom 2nd Season – Kōtarō Takebayashi
- Beyblade Burst – Orochi Ginba
- Concrete Revolutio: Choujin Gensou – The Last Song – Ichiyū Wakamura
- Digimon Universe: App Monsters – Roleplaymon
- Erased – Jun Shiratori
- Haruchika: Haruta & Chika – Benjant
- Kiss Him, Not Me – Takurō Serinuma
- Puzzle & Dragons X – Torlie
- Soul Buster – Son Shin

2017

- Future Card Buddyfight X – Kesshōryū Atora
- Hozuki's Coolheadedness – Yomogi
- Tomica Hyper Rescue Drive Head Kidō Kyūkyū Keisatsu – Shun Kuroeda

2018

- Fate/Extra Last Encore – Gawain
- Inazuma Eleven: Ares no Tenbin – Tatsuya Kiyama
- Inazuma Eleven: Orion no Kokuin - Tatsuya Kiyama

2019

- Grimms Notes The Animation – Loki

2020

- Toilet-Bound Hanako-kun – Natsuhiko Hyūga

2021

- Heaven's Design Team – Mushibu
- Hetalia: World Stars – Finland
- Rumble Garanndoll – Megane

2023

- Ao no Orchestra – Tsutomu Kikuchi

=== Original net animation (ONA) ===
2023

- Fate/Grand Order: You’ve Lost Ritsuka Fujimaru – Sherlock Holmes

=== Original video animation (OVA) ===
- Kuro to kin no hirakanai kagi – Tomoomi Hasui
- Sentakuya Shinchan – Shinji Ohashi
- Ane Log: Moyako Neesan no Tomaranai Monologue – Akira Konoe
- Koe de Oshigoto! – Yukihira Yokoyama
- Kokoro Connect – Taichi Yaegashi
- Mizuiro – Student Boy (A)
- Mahō Sensei Negima: Mō Hitotsu no Sekai – Kotaro Inugami (adult form)
- Netrun-mon – Hiroyuki Nishimura
- Wet Summer Days – Hiroshi Inaba
- Tenbatsu! Angel Rabbie – Luka

=== Theatrical animation ===
2010

- Inazuma Eleven: Saikyō Gundan Ōga Shūrai – Hiroto Kiyama

2013

- Aura: Maryūinkōga Saigo no Tatakai – Dorisen

2014

- Inazuma Eleven: Chō Jigen Dream Match - Hiroto Kiyama/Gran

2017

- Ao Oni: The Animation – Shōichirō Murakami

2021

- Fate/Grand Order: Camelot – Wandering; Agaterám – Gawain

=== Video games ===
- Arcobaleno Portable – Nikichi Saotome
- Ao no Kanata no Four Rhythm – Hayato Shirase
- Berserk Millennium Falcon Arc: Chapter of the Holy Demon War – Serpico
- Code Geass Hangyaku no Lelouch R2: Banjou no Geass Gekijou – Rolo Lamperouge
- Cross Edge – Tōya Ijūin (Troy)
- Duel Savior Destiny – Selbium Bolt
- Edel Blume – Conrad Bartley
- Fate/Extra – Saber/Gawain
- Fate/Extra CCC – Saber/Gawain
- Fate/Grand Order – Gawain, Sherlock Holmes
- Fate/Extella – Gawain
- Mobile Suit Gundam: Extreme Vs. – Lane Aime
- Inazuma Eleven series – Hiroto Kiyama/Gran
- Jigsaw World: Daikettsu! Jigbattle Heroes – Mutekid
- Kimi to Study – Ryō Fujishiro
- Kokoro Connect Yochi Random – Taichi Yaegashi
- Lamento: Beyond the Void – Tokino
- Little Battlers Experience Wars – Takeru Kojō
- Rockman Zero series – X
- Rockman ZX series – Model X
- Mobile Suit Gundam: Spirits of Zeon – Dual Stars of Carnage
- Shōnen Onmyōji: With These Wings, Return to the Skies – Koshikage
- SD Gundam G GENERATION SPIRITS – Lane Aime
- SD Gundam G GENERATION WORLD – Sheld Foley, Lane Aime
- SD Gundam G GENERATION OVER WORLD – Sheld Foley, Lane Aime
- Shuugyo Ryokou: Koto Meisou Chizu – Shōhei Nanbu
- Simple2000 The Mystery: And Everyone Disappears – Kappa
- Star Ocean: Second Evolution – Noel Chandler
- Super Robot Wars Z2: Saisei-hen – Rolo Lamperouge
- Super Robot Wars V – Lane Aime
- Tales of Graces – Hubert Oswell
- White Album 2 – Haruki Kitahara
- Zettai Meikyuu Grimm – Ludwig Grimm

=== Tokusatsu ===
2014

- Ressha Sentai ToQger – Jack-in-the-box Shadow (ep. 20)

=== Dubbing ===
==== Live-action ====
- American Pie Presents: Band Camp – Ernie Kaplowitz (Jason Earles)
- Caravan of Courage: An Ewok Adventure – Mace Towani (Eric Walker)
- Chronicle – Andrew Detmer (Dane DeHaan)
- Detention – Mick Ashton (Corey Sevier)
- Ewoks: The Battle for Endor – Mace Towani (Eric Walker)
- Final Destination 2 (2006 TV Tokyo edition) – Rory Peters (Jonathan Cherry)
- Finding Forrester – Clay (Damion Lee)
- Geek Charming – Josh Rosen (Matt Prokop)
- Girls – Charlie Dattolo (Christopher Abbott)
- Gosford Park – Lord Rupert Standish (Laurence Fox)
- High School Musical 3: Senior Year – Jimmy "Rocket Man" Zara (Matt Prokop)
- JAG – Derrick Newton (Matt Newton)
- Malcolm in the Middle – Jerome (Andrew James Allen)
- Newcastle – Jesse Hoff (Lachlan Buchanan)
- Pretty Little Liars – Garrett Reynolds (Yani Gellman)
- Scott Pilgrim vs. the World – Scott Pilgrim (Michael Cera)
- Scream VI – Ethan Landry (Jack Champion)
- Sweet Sixteen – Side-kick (Gary Maitland)
- The Way, Way Back – Duncan (Liam James)

==== Animation ====
- Batman: The Brave and the Bold – Hawk
- Courage the Cowardly Dog – Ratatouille

=== Drama CD ===
- 17 Sai no Hisoka na Yokujou – Rin
- Aishitenai to Ittekure – Sakamoto
- Ai no Kotoba mo Shiranaide – Keiichi Kojima
- Ai to Bakudan 2: Kizudarake no Tenshi Domo ~Marked for Death Requiem ni Kabe wo Zenpen~ – Mitsuru Koga
- Ai wa Bara Iro no Kiss – Fisherman
- Akaya Akashiya Ayakashino – Tougo Tsubaki
- Baka na Inu Hodo Kawaikute – Kazuki Yano
- Barajou no Kiss – Itsushi Narumi
- Chiru Chiru, Michiru – Hiro Takahashi
- Chocolate Kiss
- Code Geass: Lelouch of the Rebellion R2 – Rolo Lamperouge
- Chiisana Koi no Melody – Nakazawa Tatsumi
- dear – Hanesto Subaru
- Drama CD Devil Survivor – Protagonist
- Girl's High Character Song & Drama as Takanori Shimotakanani
- Hanbun no Tsuki ga Noboru Sora – Looking Up at the Half Moon as Yūichi Ezaki
- Hetalia: Axis Powers – Finland
- Innai Kansen – Sou Tachibana
- Koi Dorobou wo Sagase!
- Koi no Iro – Nao
- Konna Otoko wa Aisareru – Keiichi Kojima
- Love-Berrish! – Kon Miyagi
- Melancholic Mellow Mellow – Yuuta
- Onmyō Taisenki Special Soundtrack – Ryūji Kamiya
- Oresama Teacher – Hayasaka
- Otokogokoro – Jun Shinomiya
- Otokonoko niwa Himitsu ga Aru – Chihaya Arisugawa
- Remastered Tracks Rockman Zero series - X
- Saint Beast Others 1 – Kanan
- Second Serenade
- Shimekiri no Sono Mae ni
- Shingouki Series – Orange no Kokoro – Muraji Tanaka
- Toritsu Mahō Gakuen – Tsukasa Takagi
- Wanko to Nyanko series – Junya Asou
- Warui Koto Shitai series – Aikawa Towa
- White Album 2 – Haruki Kitahara
- Yuki Kaen (Cute Person) – Yūichi Ezaki

=== Television ===
- Fuji TV's My Wife's Having an Affair This Week?
- Fanes (TBS's I'm Gonna Give It to You Straight! July 25, 2006)
