= 9 R.I.P. =

2023 video game

- Genre: Otome, romance
- Video game

9 R.I.P.
- Developer: Idea Factory, Design Factory
- Publisher: Otomate
- Genre: Visual novel
- Platform: Nintendo Switch
- Released: JP: June 29, 2023; WW: October 15, 2024
- Video game

9 R.I.P. sequel
- Developer: Idea Factory
- Publisher: Otomate
- Genre: Visual novel
- Platform: Nintendo Switch
- Released: JP: September 25, 2025; WW: October 27, 2026

9 R.I.P. is a Japanese otome game developed by Idea Factory and released under their Otomate brand on June 29, 2023, for the Nintendo Switch.

== Production and release ==
The game was originally announced at the Otomate Party 2022 (held between 3 and 4 September), where it was revealed that the game would be released in 2023. Idea Factory later announced that the game would be released on June 29.

A sequel titled 9 R.I.P. sequel was announced at the Otomate Party 2024 (August 18, 2024). It was released on September 25, 2025.

=== International release ===
9 R.I.P. was released in English by Idea Factory International on October 15, 2025.

Idea Factory International announced that 9 R.I.P. sequel will also be released in English. The game was released on October 27, 2026.

== Characters ==
Misa Isshiki (逸色 珠沙, Isshiki Misa)
The protagonist (name can be changed). A second-year high school student. Her life or death changes depending on the route. Her struggle with choosing her career path after high school graduation serves as the starting point of the story, and it holds significant meaning within each route as well.

Kureha (紅華, Kureha)
Voiced by Toshiki Masuda

Hibiki (響, Hibiki)
Voiced by: Shun'ichi Toki

Kōyō (香羊, Kōyō)
Voiced by: Ryōta Suzuki

Sena (星絆, Sena)
Voiced by: Tetsuya Kakihara

Minami (魅ナミ, Minami)
Voiced by: Nobuhiko Okamoto

Seiya (聖ヤ, Seiya)
Voiced by: Shinnosuke Tachibana

Yukimaro (幸麿, Yukimaro)
Voiced by: KENN

Koharu (狐春, Koharu)
Voiced by: Yōhei Azakami

Tōka (桃嘉, Tōka)
Voiced by: Kōhei Amasaki

Sayaka Hida (飛騨 咲耶果, Hida Sayaka)
Voiced by: Narumi Kaho

Tsubasa Isshiki (逸色 翼, Isshiki Tsubasa)
Voiced by: Tomoko Ikeda

Ayame Isshiki (逸色 絢芽, Isshiki Ayame)
Voiced by: Airi Ōtsu

Yui (優衣, Yui)
Voiced by: Ruriko Noguchi

Reika Misumi (美住 レイカ, Misumi Reika)
Voiced by: Saran Tajima

Kannushi (神主, Kannushi)
Voiced by: Takahiro Yoshizawa

== Music ==
- "eternal" (Ending theme for the School Ghost Stories arc) Artist: Pluto. Lyrics & Composition: tsuzuki
- "Rin'ne (輪廻; 'Reincarnation', Ending theme for the urban legend arc)" Artist: Williams' % Range. Lyrics: Ōma. Composition: Shayou
- "Memories" (Ending theme for the alternate world arc) Artist: Pluto. Lyrics and composition: kei
- "Hōai (法愛; 'Dharma-love', Ending theme for the Yō arc)" Artist: Williams' % Range. Lyrics: Ōma. Composition: Shayō

== Stage play ==
A stage play adaptation took place at the Zenrosai Hall/Space zero in Tokyo from 12 till 16 March 2025.

Cast
Character	Actor
Misa Isshiki	Uta Kawase
Benika	Kota Shiomi
Hibiki	Kaisei Abe
Koyo	Kosuke Naito (Note: Originally, Shinichi Hashimoto was cast to play, however, he withdrew from the performance.)
Sehan	Toshihiko Tanaka
Minami	DION
Seiya	Yamien
Yukimaro	Yudai Suzuki
Koharu	Soichiro Sorihashi
Hida Sayaka	Madoka Moriyasu

== Reception ==
Reception

Aggregate score
Aggregator	Score
Metacritic	84/100

Review score
Publication	Score
RPGFan	89/100

9 R.I.P. received generally favorable reviews from critics, according to the review aggregation website Metacritic.

Audra Bowling at RPGFan assessed the game, giving it a score of 89 out of 100. The game was praised for its "likeable protagonist," the character designs by Yuuya, the sound affects, the voice acting, and the theme songs. However, they also noted the insensitive themes, such as bullying, and gruesome scenarios.
