= Sympathy Kiss =

2022 video game

- Cover art
- Developers: Otomate (Idea Factory), Design Factory
- Publishers: JP: Idea Factory; NA/EU: Idea Factory International
- Platforms: Nintendo Switch, Android, iOS
- Release: Nintendo Switch: JP: November 17, 2022; NA/EU: February 27, 2024; iOS and Android: JP: January 18, 2024
- Genres: Visual novel, otome game
- Mode: Single-player

Sympathy Kiss is a 2022 otome game and visual novel developed by Otomate and Design Factory.

== Plot ==
Akari Amasawa, a designer for the mobile app company Estario, is suddenly asked to join another department to relaunch Estarci, the company's namesake and its worst-performing app. The Estarci planning department includes some of the company's most talented men, and Akari is set to work in a pair with a coworker of her choice.

== Gameplay ==
As Sympathy Kiss is a visual novel, gameplay consists of reading dialogue and making choices. Certain choices affect the protagonist's work-life balance, determining whether the player sees a Work End, a Love End, or a third ending that balances work and love. Some choices are made through the Emotion Select system, where the player chooses a reaction using a face symbol instead of traditional dialogue choices.

== Reception ==
Reception

Aggregate score
Aggregator	Score
Metacritic	78/100

Review scores
Publication	Score
RPGFan	88/100
Digitally Downloaded	4.5/5
Siliconera	7/10
Anime News Network	B

Sympathy Kiss received generally favorable reviews, according to the review aggregation website Metacritic.
