= Bustafellows =

2019 video game

- Developer: Nippon Cultural Broadcasting Extend
- Publishers: JP: Nippon Cultural Broadcasting Extend; NA/EU: PQube
- Platforms: Nintendo Switch, Windows, iOS, Android
- Release: Nintendo Switch, iOS, Android: JP: December 19, 2019; Nintendo Switch, Microsoft Windows: NA/EU: July 30, 2021
- Genres: Visual novel, otome game
- Mode: Single-player

Bustafellows (stylized as BU$TAFELLOWS) is a 2019 otome game and visual novel developed by Tokyo-based studio eXtend (Nippon Cultural Broadcasting Extend). It was released for Nintendo Switch and mobile devices in Japan, and an English version was released for Nintendo Switch and Microsoft Windows in 2021. A sequel titled Bustafellows Season 2 (stylized as BU$TAFELLOWS season2) was released in 2023 in Japan, and an English version was released in 2025. A third game called BUSTAFELLOWS FULLCIRCLE has been announced.

== Plot ==
Teuta is a 21-year-old freelance journalist who has the unique ability to briefly time travel to the past by inhabiting other people's bodies. After she happens to witness the murder of "crooked" lawyer Limbo Fitzgerald, she uses her ability to prevent his death and is drawn into the criminal underworld with Limbo and his teammates. There are five male characters that Teuta can enter a romantic relationship with, and the game has multiple endings based on the choices the player makes.

== Gameplay ==
Bustafellows is a visual novel where the player's decisions determine which route the story takes. Some choices have a time limit attached, and making certain choices grants "memorabilia" that can unlock "extra episodes" for the player to read.

== Reception ==
Reception

Aggregate score
| Aggregator | Score |
|---|---|
| Metacritic | 86/100 |

Review scores
| Publication | Score |
|---|---|
| Hardcore Gamer | 4.5/5 |
| RPGFan | 85/100 |
| Digitally Downloaded | 5/5 |
| Siliconera | 8/10 |

Bustafellows received "generally favorable" reviews, according to the review aggregation website Metacritic.

By 2024, over 100,000 copies of Bustafellows had been sold.
