= Ururun Quest: Koiyuuki =

2005 video game

Ururun Quest Koiyuuki
- Developer(s): Vingt-et-un Systems
- Publisher(s): D3
- Platform(s): PlayStation 2
- Release: JP: July 28, 2005
- Genre(s): Love Simulation+RPG
- Mode(s): Single player

Ururun Quest: Koiyuuki (うるるんクエスト恋遊記) is a fully voiced Japanese PS2 videogame classified as an 'Onna no Ko Senyou (Girl-targeted) Love Simulation+RPG' by its developer. It was released in 2005 and marketed as the first 'RPG targeted towards girls'. The player acts as the main character, Ruri, while she adventures around her world with her friends and finding new companions.

== Gameplay ==
UQ's gameplay is mostly RPG. The most time is spent leveling characters in random battles on an overworld map and in dungeons, leading up to difficult boss battles. The fighting party consists of three characters from a possible six characters at any one time.

There is also a simulation element seen in a cooking minigame while resting, and character interaction. Dialogue and actions chosen while resting outside or while in cities will affect the relationship of the main character with the other characters. When the relationship develops, the other characters will show their bond in battle by protecting or helping the main character. The relationship level also affects story events that occur while resting and in some dungeons.

== Plot ==
Ruri, Tsukishiro, and Shuka are childhood friends in the city of Soi. As a summer school project, Ruri decides to explore the history of their land. Tsukishiro and Shuka decide to go with her to protect her, since outside the town monsters attack travelers. As the story progresses, they travel to other continents using special map pieces and gain companions. They learn that the fog that covers the land, making it difficult to navigate, is caused by demons. Ruri decides to fight the demons and get rid of the fog.

== Characters ==
- Ruri 瑠璃 (Mayuko Kobayashi): Main character. Curious and cheerful, she starts out without a job class.
- Tsukishiro (Akira Ishida 石田彰): Childhood friend of the heroine. He starts out as a swordsman.
- Shuka (Aya Ishizu 石津 彩): Childhood friend. She begins as a mage.
- Shion 紫苑 (Takuma Takewaka 竹若拓磨): A strange mage that knows Tsukishiro, he joins the party near the beginning. He begins as a mage.
- Kurenai 紅 (Shoutarou Morikubo 森久保祥太郎): A seemingly lazy, selfish prince that joins the party in the second city. He starts out as a ninja.
- Shirogane (Katsuhiko Kawamoto): The personal bodyguard and knight of Kurenai, he has a strong sense of responsibility. He's also Kyara's older brother. Starts out as a knight.
- Miru (Makoto Ishii 石井 真): A brainy young alchemist who joins the party to expand his knowledge. Starts out as an alchemist.
- Kyara (Kayo Kikkawa): A young priestess who joins the party to help her older brother. Starts out as a healer.
- Shenri 深栗 (Jun Fukuyama 福山潤): A demon that has no will to live. He is an optional character that can be gained almost halfway through the game.
- Hisui (Akiko Yoshikawa):
- Muutan (Chika ) : Mysterious demon girl who shows up at night sometimes.
- Raoshia (Etsuko Ishikawa):
- Shanri (Ohmiya): Demon.
- Yuui-En (Kihiko): Demon prince.

== Reception ==
When UQ was first released, it was not very well received. Critics said that though it was billed as a love simulation RPG, the RPG elements dominated too much, and players that were used to other love simulations would find it too long to replay to get more characters. It was also criticized that the RPG was not up to the standard of contemporary RPGs, with an unforgiving save feature, slow traveling, and a confusing overworld map.

When it was later released cheaply as part of the Simple Ultimate series, opinion seemed to improve, since the game was a good value as a budget title.

== Related products ==
A comic was also released as Ururun Quest Koiyuuki Anthology Comic (ISBN 4-7577-2445-4) from Enterbrain under the B's Log Comics label on September 30, 2005.
