= Lover Pretend =

2021 video game

- North American cover
- Developers: Otomate (Idea Factory), Design Factory
- Publishers: JP: Idea Factory; NA/EU: Aksys Games
- Platform: Nintendo Switch
- Release: JP: March 25, 2021; NA/EU: December 1, 2022
- Genres: Visual novel, otome game
- Mode: Single-player

Lover Pretend is a 2021 otome game and visual novel developed by Otomate and Design Factory. It was released for the Nintendo Switch on March 25, 2021 in Japan, and on December 1, 2022 in western regions.

== Plot ==
Chiyuki Ueda is a young woman studying screenwriting at university, but she has trouble writing romance. After being given the opportunity to help with a new film directed by one of the few men who worked with her now-deceased mother, Chiyuki intends to discover the identity of her biological father, all while aiming to make the film a success alongside the sons of the men who worked on the film her mother wrote.

== Gameplay ==
As Lover Pretend is a visual novel, gameplay consists of reading dialogue and making choices that determine the protagonist's relationships with her possible love interests. At certain points in the story, Pretend Time events require the player to make choices within a time limit. There is a smartphone system with a RiNG messaging app, where you can interact with the characters.

== Characters ==
Chiyuki Ueda (宇枝 ちゆき, Ueda Chiyuki)
The main character who takes up a scriptwriting job while searching for her biological father. Her first name can be changed.

Kazuma Kamikubo (上久保 数馬, Kamikubo Kazuma)
Voiced by Makoto Furukawa
Chiyuki's childhood friend from middle school, he is a hairstylist who is bright and energetic.

Yukito Sena (瀬名 由稀人, Sena Yukito)
Voiced by Tatsuhisa Suzuki
A popular fashion model, despite being very social, he never neglects his responsibilities.

Harumi Makino (真木野 春三, Makino Harumi)
Voiced by Kengo Kawanishi
A cold and aloof third year at collage, he is secretly and otaku.

Riku Nishijima (西嶋 理玖, Nishijima Riku)
Voiced by Tomoaki Maeno
A popular actor who is kind and gentle, he is popular with both men and women, being a second-generation actor, his father manages his casting calls.

Eiichirou Asagi (浅木 詠一郎, Asagi Eiichirō)
Voiced by Toshiyuki Morikawa
The son of a famous screenwriter who is also a guest lecturer at Chiyuki's university.

Takaya Hanai (花井 隆也, Hanai Takaya)
Voiced by Susumu Chiba
A popular actor who has appeared in many films directed by Harumi's father.

Yuuzou Makino (真木野 雄三, Makino Yūzō)
Voiced by Shigeo Kiyama
A famous movie director who is Harumi's father.

Kousuke Nishijima (西嶋 浩介, Nishijima Kōsuke)
Voiced by Kōichi Tōchika
A former movie star, he is Riku's father.

Yuu Kayama (鹿山 ゆう, Kayama Yū)
Voiced by Kanoko Akahori
A professional stylist and makeup artist, she is Kazuma's colleague and mentor.

Kirari (綺羅梨, Kirari)
Voiced by Miho Ishigami
A confident magazine model, she is in love with Yukito.

== Development ==
Lover Pretend was originally announced at the Otomate Party 2018, with the intention of being released in 2019. In July 2020, it was announced that the game was delayed to 2021. The game was released on March 25, 2021, for the Nintendo Switch.

On August 6, 2021, Aksys Games announced at the All Aksys 2021 event that they had acquired thew license to release the game in English. The release date was announced as December 2022, and the game was released on December 1, 2022, in both North America and Europe.

== Reception ==
Reception

Aggregate score
Aggregator	Score
Metacritic	77/100

Review scores
Publication	Score
Nintendo World Report	7/10
RPGFan	84/100
Digitally Downloaded	4/5
Siliconera	8/10

Lover Pretend received generally favorable reviews, according to the review aggregation website Metacritic.
