= Taisho × Alice =

Video game series

大正×対称アリス (Taishō × Taishō Arisu)
- Genre: Otome game, Visual novel
- Video game

Taisho x Alice episode I
- Developer: Primula
- Publisher: JP: Primula / pencil; WW: 2E Gaming; WW: Primula
- Platform: PC
- Released: JP: February 20, 2015; WW: May 9, 2017 (2E Gaming); WW: November 28, 2019
- Video game

Taisho x Alice episode II
- Developer: Primula
- Publisher: Primula / pencil
- Platform: PC
- Released: JP: May 29, 2015; WW: September 18, 2020 (Steam)
- Video game

Taisho x Alice episode III
- Developer: Primula
- Publisher: Primula / pencil
- Platform: PC
- Released: JP: August 28, 2015; WW: March 3, 2021 (Steam)
- Video game

Taisho x Alice epilogue
- Developer: Primula
- Publisher: Primula / pencil
- Platform: PC
- Released: JP: December 25, 2015; WW: June 24, 2021 (Steam)
- Video game

Taisho x Alice: All in One
- Developer: Primula
- Publisher: Prototype
- Platform: PlayStation Vita, Nintendo Switch
- Released: JP: June 2, 2016 (PS Vita); JP: April 18, 2019 (Switch); WW: April 14, 2022 (Switch)
- Video game

Taisho x Alice HEADS & TAILS
- Developer: Primula
- Publisher: Primula / pencil Prototype
- Platform: PC, PlayStation Vita, Nintendo Switch
- Released: JP: April 21, 2017 (PC); JP: December 7, 2017 (PS Vita); JP: October 29, 2020 (Switch); WW: July 26, 2022 (PC); WW: September 21, 2023 (Switch)

Taisho × Alice (大正×対称アリス, Taishou x Taishou Arisu; lit. 'Taisho x Symmetrical Alice') is a series of Japanese otome games developed by Primula and originally released for Windows.

Four games were released from 2015 till 2021, along with a compilation game and fan disc.

== Characters ==
Yurika Arisu (有栖 百合花, Arisu Yurika)
The 17-year-old protagonist. She is modeled after Alice from Through the Looking-Glass.
While the initial design by character designer Mero featured a blue color scheme, it was changed to a white-based design at the request of scenario writer Fuji-fumi.
Cinderella (シンデレラ, Shinderera)
Voiced by Daisuke Hirakawa
Red Riding Hood (赤ずきん, Akazukin)
Voced by Tomoaki Maeno
Kaguya (かぐや, Kaguya)
Voiced by Toshiki Masuda
Gretel (グレーテル, Gurēteru)
Voiced by Takuya Eguchi
Snow White (白雪, Shirayuki)
Voiced by Shouta Aoi
Wizard (魔法使い, Mahoutsukai)
Voiced by Wataru Hatano
Alice (アリス, Arisu)
Voiced by Yoshitsugu Matsuoka
A boy Yurika meets; he wears a ribbon in his hair. He is lethargic and shows little interest in those around him, yet he possesses a sharp tongue and frequently makes shocking remarks. Like Yurika, his design is based on Alice, but it is crafted to serve as a counterpart to hers.

== Development and release ==
The first game, titled Taisho × Alice Episode I was released for Windows on February 20, 2015. The game was first published in English by 2E Gaming in May 2017, however, due to its negative reception, it was re-released in English by Primula on November 28, 2019.

The second game, Taisho × Alice Episode II was released on May 29, 2015. The game was released in English on September 18, 2020, on Steam.

The third game, Taisho × Alice Episode III was released on August 28, 2015. The game was released on Steam in English on March 3, 2021.

The fourth game, Taisho × Alice epilogue was released on December 25, 2015. The game was exclusively available via DMM.com starting February 6, 2016. The game was released on Steam on June 24, 2021.

A compilation game, Taisho x Alice: All in One was released on June 2, 2016, for the PlayStation Vita. The game was later released for the Nintendo Switch on April 18, 2019. The game was released in English on April 14, 2022.

A fan disc titled Taisho x Alice HEADS & TAILS was originally released on April 21, 2017, for Windows, and later ported to the PlayStation Vita on December 7, 2017. The game was later released on the Nintendo Switch on October 29, 2020. The game was released in English on Steam on July 26, 2022, and later released for the Nintendo Switch on September 21, 2023.

== Reception ==
By December 2025, the game had passed 320,000 total copies sold.

The original English translation of the first game by 2E Gaming in 2017 garnered negative reception due it's many errors, being described as "less than satisfactory."
