= Full House Kiss =

2004 video game

フルハウスキス (Furuhausukisu)
- Genre: Comedy, Romance, Slice of Life
- Manga
- Written by: Shiori Yuwa
- Published by: Hakusensha
- Magazine: Hana to Yume, The Hana to Yume
- Original run: 2004 – 2008
- Volumes: 6
- Video game
- Publisher: Capcom
- Genre: Visual novel
- Platform: PlayStation 2, PlayStation Network
- Released: PlayStation 2 July 22nd, 2004; PlayStation Network; October 17, 2012
- Video game

Full House Kiss 2
- Publisher: Capcom
- Genre: Visual novel
- Platform: PlayStation 2
- Released: February 23rd, 2006

Full House Kiss (フルハウスキス, Furuhausukisu) is a Japanese visual novel created by Capcom for the PlayStation 2. A manga adaptation wass created at the same time as the video game, and was drawn by Shiori Yuwa and published in Hana to Yume & The Hana to Yume. The video game used the same character designs and plot in a love simulation published by Capcom in 2004. A sequel to the video game, called Full House Kiss 2, was released in 2006.

== Plot ==
Suzuhara Mugi, a 15-year-old girl, is determined to get onto the campus of the elite Shoukei high school. Mugi is searching for her missing sister—her only remaining family—and she has been led to believe that someone or something on the campus of that school will help her in her search. Unfortunately the strict school security is preventing her from getting onto the school grounds.

However, her luck changes when she runs into Midou-kun, the son of a rich mega-corporation president, and an elite person at the school. Midou is smug and arrogant, but he eventually strikes up a deal with Mugi—he will get her onto the school grounds, but she must come to his house and work as a maid. He lives with 3 other boys, known as the La Princes in the super elite school.

Her optimism and cheerfulness makes her attractive to the four boys. As the manga progresses, the romantic feelings of the boys start surfacing.

== Characters ==
=== Principal female characters ===
Mugi Suzuhara (鈴原 むぎ)
Voiced by: Sanae Kobayashi (drama CD only)
She lost her parents and is looking for her sister who has disappeared. The only clue is Shoukei High School and there she meets Kazuya Midou who helps her, and asks her to be a maid, in exchange, he will help her to enter Shoukei High to investigate about the disappearance of her sister. She accepts the conditions and becomes a fake art teacher, whilst being a maid for four cute guys. When the series progresses she starts to have feelings for Kazuya. She is referred as "Princess" by Iori.
Nae Suzuhara (鈴原 苗)
Mugi's missing older sister. Some people think she eloped. It appears she might have disappeared with Shoukei Gakuen's Andou-san, but that may not be true.
Natsumi Okazaki (丘崎 夏実)
Mugi's best friend from her childhood. She's the daughter of the Okazuki Construction Company's president and has always been worrying about Mugi. She started going to Shoukei Gakuen not long before Mugi became the art teacher there. She also knows that Mugi entered the school to look for her missing sister and that she lives with the princes.

=== Princes of Shoukei Academy ===
Kazuya Midou (御堂 一哉)
Voiced by: Hideki Ogihara

3rd yr

Heir to the Midou Group who aims to become the managing director of it. He is the one that had asked Mugi to become a maid in the house he lived in, in exchange of him helping her out with finding her sister. He seems to be perfect at everything, one of the top students in the nation - but that may not be the case. Kazuya is not sure about his feelings towards Mugi, but has always been protective of her.
Iori Matsugawa (松川 依織)

19yrs old, 3rd yr

Voiced by: Nozomu Sasaki
He comes from a prestigious family of Kabuki actors and started out playing female roles. Due to his adult-like manner he's incredibly popular with the ladies. He thinks that one day everyone will love him, and treats Mugi like a princess. It was revealed that Iori has feelings for her too: when Mugi asked him if he is in love with someone right now, Iori answered by giving her a peck on forehead and telling her that he will try not to get mixed up in that.
Asaki Hanekura (羽倉 麻生)
Voiced by: Takahiro Sakurai
Heir to the Hanekura Bank. He likes playing billiards and riding his motorbike. He used to hate women till he met Mugi, who made him think otherwise. He has revealed his romantic feelings to Mugi many times indirectly.
Sei Ichimiya (一宮 瀬伊)
Voiced by: Makoto Naruse
A genius pianist and violinist. Loves playing pointless pranks. He likes to hug Mugi, even if she feels embarrassed every time he does this. Sei is very straightforward, and was the first person to ask Mugi out.

== Gameplay ==
Full House Kiss is an otome game with dating simulation elements. Every day after school, members of the protagonist's household have chore requests with a finite amount of time to get them done. Performance is determined by choices the player makes. At the end of the evening, the love interests all visit the player to report on how they did.

Doing the chores well will increase the protagonist's standing with the game's love interests, as will completing any relevant minigames. Scenes with the boys require the player to react effectively, and some events can only occur with the boy that the player has the highest standing with.

In addition to the chores, the player can also encounter boys in rooms around the house, which can lead to some minigames or conversations.

The larger aspect of the game is solving the disappearance of the protagonist's sister. Investigations are done while at school or after school hours by acting like a teacher to keep suspicion away.

== Games ==
The game was originally announced in April 2004. On July 17, a special event was held regarding the game with one of the voice actors regarding the game. The game was officially released on July 22, 2004, PlayStation 2. The game was also ported to mobile phone on January 21, 2010.

A sequel was announced on June 21, 2005. The game was released on February 23, 2006. The version of the sequel, titled Full House Kiss 2 ~Love Labyrinth~ (フルハウスキス2 ～恋愛迷宮(ラブラビリンス)～, Furu Hausu Kisu 2 ~Rabu Rabirinsu~), was released of PC on December, 20, 2007.
