= Edel Blume =

2008 video game

エーデルブルーメ (Ēderuburūme)
- Genre: Otome game
- Video game
- Developer: Idea Factory
- Publisher: Idea Factory
- Designed by: Usuba Kagero
- Platform: PlayStation 2
- Released: JP: April 24, 2008

Edel Blume (エーデルブルーメ, Ēderuburūme) is a Japanese otome visual novel developed and published by Idea Factory.

== Plot ==
Mary, a nun residing in a village, has been plagued by mysterious unexplainable nightmares of her doing something horrible. As she turns sixteen, a mysterious noble, Gerald, appears on the mountaintop, proclaiming "When Mary reaches the age of 16, offer her to me as my bride." (「メアリが16歳を迎えた暁に、彼女を花嫁として捧げよ」, "Meari ga jūroku-sai o mukaeta akatsuki ni, kanojo wo hanayome to shite sasageyo"). At the same time, strange things begin happening around the village.

== Characters ==
=== Main characters ===
Mary (メアリ, Meari)
The protagonist of this work. A nun in the village. She has no memories of her early childhood. As her 16th birthday approaches, she is plagued by nightmares.

Gerald Vielwind (ジェラルド・ヴィルベルヴィント, Jerarudo Viruberuvinto)
Voiced by Katsuyuki Konishi
A nobleman living at the mountain's peak in the village. His true identity is a vampire. He desires Mary as his bride.

Conrad Báthory (コンラッド・バートリ, Konrad do Bātori)
Voiced by Takahiro Mizushima
A calm and collected inquisitor.

Victor Friedrich (ヴィクトル・フリードリヒ, Vikutoru Fūridorihi)
Voiced by Hiroki Yasumoto
The protagonist's childhood friend. Shunned in the village as a delinquent. He harbor feelings for the protagonist.

Auguste Müller (オーギュスト・ミュラー, Ōgyusuto Myurā)
Voiced by Yoshimasa Hosoya
The protagonist's childhood friend and a village teacher. Like Victor, he has feelings for the protagonist and tends to spoil her.

Richard Cantemir (リチャード・カンテミール, Richādo Kantemīru)
Voiced by Kishō Taniyama
The village chief's son. A cheerful young man who has feelings for the protagonist.

Balázs von István (バラージュ・フォン・イシュトヴァーン, Barāju fon Ishutovān)
Voiced by Junichi Suwabe
A nobleman visiting the village. His true identity is a vampire, but he is opposed to Gerald.

=== Secondary characters ===
Daniela Brâncuși (ダニエラ・ブランクーシ, Daniera Burankūshi)
Voiced by Yuka Hirose
A nun at the church. She is a senior to the protagonist.

Realm (レルム, Rerumu)
Voiced by Naoko Sugiura
Gerald's familiar. Unlike his master, he is quite talkative.

Ilya Cantemir (イリヤ・カンテミール, Iriya Kantemīru)
Voiced by Meiko Kawasaki
The village chief's daughter. Richard's younger sister and the protagonist's best friend.

Virginia Moreno (バージニア・モレノ, Bājinia Moreno)
Voiced by Rie Takahashi
A nun at the church.

Jacob Cantemir (ヤコブ・カンテミール, Yakobu Kantemīru)
Voiced by Kiyoto Furukai
The village chief. Father of Richard and Ilya.

Gilbert (ギルベルト, Giruberuto)
Voiced by Ryōta Asari
A young man from the village.

Leo (レオ, Reo)
Voiced by Masayoshi Sugawara
A young man from the village.

== Game ==
The game was first announced on December 12, 2007. The character designs and artwork were done by Usuba Kagero (who also did Code: Realize).

The game was released on April 24, 2008, for the PlayStation 2.

== Music ==
The theme song is "Due destini", performed by love solfege.

== Fanbook ==
Edel Blume Official Fanbook (エーデルブルーメ 公式ビジュアルファンブック, Ēderuburūme kōshiki bijuarufanbukku; ISBN 978-4-7577-4353-3) was released by Enterbrain on June 30, 2008.

== Reception ==
Edel Blume was amongst the nominees for Famitsu's best game of 2008.
