= Birushana (otome game series) =

Video game series

ビルシャナ戦姫 (Birushana Senki)
- Genre: Otome game
- Video game

Birushana: Rising Flower of Genpei
- Developer: Idea Factory; Red Entertainment
- Publisher: Otomate
- Directed by: Ai Ito
- Designed by: Koji Haneda
- Platform: Nintendo Switch; Nintendo Switch Lite
- Released: JP: September 17, 2020; NA: June 28, 2022; EU: July 1, 2022
- Video game

Birushana: Winds of Fate
- Developer: Idea Factory; Red Entertainment
- Publisher: Otomate
- Platform: Nintendo Switch; Nintendo Switch Lite
- Released: JP: March 31, 2022; WW: May 26, 2026

Birushana (ビルシャナ戦姫, Birushana senhime; 'Birushana's Warrior Princess') is a Japanese otome game series by Idea Factory (under their Otomate brand) and Red Entertainment.

== Plot ==
The game is inspired by the Genpei War. Although the game features actual historical figures, their fate has been changed.

Fifteen years since the Heiji Rebellion, during which time the Heike clan reaches its height of power, Shanao, who will eventually go by the name of Yoshitsune, is dispatched to the Kurama-dera Temple without people knowing that she is female. Having learned warfare and the skills in martial arts as a girl from the Genji clan, she meets Yoritomo, Benkei, and others, until finally she challenges the Heike clan.

== Characters ==
=== Main Characters ===
Shanaou (遮那王, Shanaō) / Minamoto no Yoshitsune (源義経, Minamoto no Yoshitsune)
The female protagonist and player character. Shanaou is her childhood name, and she later takes the name Yoshitsune. Her surname is fixed, but her first name can be changed.
The illegitimate child of Minamoto no Yoshitomo. After her father was defeated and died in the Heiji Rebellion, she was placed in the care of Kurama-dera Temple to escape the purge of the Minamoto clan. Raised as a male since childhood, she received an elite education in expectation of defeating the Taira clan, but she herself does not wish for conflict and hesitates.
Minamoto no Yoritomo (源頼朝, Minamoto no Yoritomo)
Voiced by Makoto Furukawa
The legitimate son of Minamoto no Yoshitomo and Yoshitsune's older half-brother. Having lost his father and older brother in the Heiji Rebellion during his youth, he was also sent into exile. Due to his circumstances, he harbors a sense of loneliness and is cold and ruthless, risking his life for the revival of the Minamoto clan without showing his true feelings.
Taira no Tomomori (平知盛, Taira no Tomomori)
Voiced by Jun Fukuyama
The son of Taira no Kiyomori and the commander-in-chief of the Heike army. Calm, collected, and excellent in martial arts, he is deeply trusted by Kiyomori. Contrary to his gentle appearance, he ruthlessly annihilates enemies on the battlefield. Although he grieves over the state of the Heike, he remains a bystander.
Taira no Noritsune (平教経, Taira no Noritsune)
Voiced by Kengo Kawanishi
The nephew of Taira no Kiyomori and Tomomori's cousin. Brave and fierce, he is considered the greatest warrior of the Heike, yet he is never arrogant and takes great pride as a Heike samurai. Unlike Tomomori, he does not doubt the prosperity of the Heike. He views Shanaou, who is the same age, as his arch-rival.
Musashibo Benkei (武蔵坊弁慶, Musashibō Benkei)
Voiced by Yuichiro Umehara
A warrior monk who was formerly stationed at Mount Hiei's Enryaku-ji Temple. He has a straightforward, honest personality. He was hunting swords in the capital of Kyoto against the tyrannical Heike clan, but after being defeated by Shanaou, he became her retainer and swore his loyalty.
Shungen (春玄, Shungen)
Voiced by Soma Saito
The child of Minamoto no Shigenari, a retainer of Minamoto no Yoshitomo. Because he was placed in the care of Kurama-dera Temple along with Shanaou after his father's death in battle, he knows her secret. Bright, dignified, and well-versed in military strategy, he has a feminine appearance but possesses swordsmanship skills that rival Shanaou's.

=== Secondary Characters ===
Taira no Shigehira (平重衡, Taira no Shigehira)
Voiced by Ryota Osaka
The son of Taira no Kiyomori and Tomomori's younger brother. A man of refined taste who excels in traditional arts such as Waka poetry, he deeply admires his blood brother. On the other hand, he has a side that seeks fleeting pleasures, acting cruelly on the battlefield and becoming intoxicated by the combat rather than the victory or defeat.
Sato Tsugunobu (佐藤継信, Satō Tsugunobu)
Voiced by Takashi Kondo
The child of Sato Motoharu, a retainer of the Oshu Fujiwara clan. He serves Shanaou by order of Fujiwara no Hidehira, but his loyalty is overprotective to a fault. A soft-spoken individual and a samurai excellent in martial arts, he also has a calculating, dark side.
Sato Tadanobu (佐藤忠信, Satō Tadanobu)
Voiced by Katsuyuki Konishi
Tsugunobu's younger brother. Like his brother, he serves Shanaou as a samurai. The sight of him dynamically striking down enemies on the battlefield inspires his allies time and again. He has a big-hearted personality that enlivens the atmosphere, and he speaks straightforwardly to Shanaou.
Sasaki Takatsuna (佐々木高綱, Sasaki Takatsuna)
Voiced by Amatsuki
The child of Sasaki Hideyoshi, a retainer of Minamoto no Yoshitomo. He joined Yoritomo's army to overthrow the Heike and displays excellent martial prowess as a retainer to Yoritomo and Yoshitsune. With a young and honest personality, his innocent smile comforts his comrades.
Kakunichi (覚日, Kakunichi)
Voiced by Akihiro Mine
A disciple of Ajari Rennin of Kurama-dera's Toko-bo. He raised Shanaou and Shungen, who were left at the temple immediately after birth, as temple youths, teaching them martial arts and military strategy, and fostering their aspirations to revive the Minamoto clan.
Kichiji Nobutaka (吉次信高, Kichiji Nobutaka)
Voiced by Fumitaka Ishiguro
A wealthy merchant who sells gold mined in Oshu in Kyoto. Traveling through various provinces, he is well-versed in the movements of the world. He wishes to welcome Shanaou to Hiraizumi.
Taira no Kiyomori (平清盛, Taira no Kiyomori)
Voiced by Michitake Kikuchi
The leader of the Taira clan. A figure who rose to power after his active roles in the Hogen and Heiji Rebellions. His influence is immense, and he reigns at the apex of society while maintaining a cooperative relationship with the cloistered government.
Taira no Norimori (平教盛, Taira no Norimori)
Voiced by Kodai Sumi
Noritsune's father and Taira no Kiyomori's younger half-brother. He calmly accepts the prosperity of the Heike and is a person capable of voicing opinions on Kiyomori's actions.
Taira no Tokuko (平徳子, Taira no Tokuko)
Voiced by Rina Sato
The daughter of Taira no Kiyomori, younger sister to Tomomori, and older sister to Shigehira. Raised with doting affection by Kiyomori, she has a free-spirited personality. By entering the court as Emperor Takakura's consort and giving birth to an heir, she solidified the position of the Heike clan.
Fujiwara no Hidehira (藤原秀衡, Fujiwara no Hidehira)
Voiced by Shinosuke Ogami
The third head of the Oshu Fujiwara clan. A man of character who rules over the vast region of Oshu, where the power of the Heike does not reach, and cares deeply about his clan. He also watches over Shanaou's future with concern.
Kajiwara Kagetoki (梶原景時, Kajiwara Kagetoki)
Voiced by Kouichi Sakaguchi
A military commander descended from the Kamakura clan of Sagami Province. A tactician whose thoughts are difficult to read. He moved from the Taira side to become Yoritomo's close confidant, and also serves as Shanaou's supervisor.
Minamoto no Yoshinaka (源義仲, Minamoto no Yoshinaka)
Voiced by Chiharu Sawashiro
The son of Minamoto no Yoshikata, also known as Kiso Yoshinaka. Although he behaves in a rough manner, his swordsmanship skills are certain, and his majestic presence earns him the popularity and trust of others.

== Media ==
=== Games ===
The first game, titled Birushana: Rising Flower of Genpei (ビルシャナ戦姫 〜源平飛花夢想〜, Birushana Senki ~Genpei Hika Musō~) was announced on at the Otomate Part 2018, directed by Ai Ito, the character designs were done by Koji Hanaeda. A promotional video for the game was released on August 7, 2020. The release date was announced as September 17, 2020, with pre-orders beginning on August 5, the game was released for the Nintendo Switch. The games theme song, Kimi ni Saku Hana (君に咲く花; 'The flower that blooms for you') was performed by Amatsuki, who plays Sasaki Takatsuna as well as the ending song Kachō Fūei (花鳥諷詠; 'Singing of the beauty of nature'). Idea Factory International announced that the game would be released in English. The game was released in English on June 28 in North America and July 1 in Europe.

The second game, titled Birushana: Winds of Fate (ビルシャナ戦姫 〜一樹の風〜, Birushana Senki ~Ichiju no Kaze~), a sequel and fan disc to the first game, was announced in September 2021. The game was released on March 31, 2022. The opening song, Yumetsubaki (夢椿; 'Dream Camellia') was performed by WHiSANT, as was the ending song Koi no Hana (恋の華; 'Flower of Love'). Idea Factory International announced that the game would be released in English in 2026. The game was released on May 26, 2026, however, the physical for Europe was delayed until June 26, 2026.

=== Drama CD ===
- Birushana: Rising Flower of Genpei Drama CD Tales of the Scenic Route (ビルシャナ戦姫 〜源平飛花夢想〜 ドラマCD 道草綴り, Birushana Senki ~Genpei Hika Musō~ Dorama CD Michikusa Tsuzuri) was released on March 10, 2021.
- Birushana: Rising Flower of Genpei: Genpei Side-Tales (ビルシャナ戦姫 〜源平飛花夢想〜 ドラマCD 源平余話, Birushana Senki ~Genpei Hika Musō~ Dorama CD Genpei Yowa) released on December 22, 2021.

=== Reading play ===
The reading drama event "Otomate Dramatic Theater" Vol. 2, Birushana Senki ~Genpei Akikaze no Mai~ (ビルシャナ戦姫 〜源平秋風の舞〜) was performed on October 9, 2022, at the Ichikawa City Cultural Hall Grand Hall. There were two performances, one in the afternoon and one in the evening, and each performance featured different content, such as dramatic readings and talk segments.

=== Stage play ===
A stage play titled Birushana Warrior Princess ~The Genpei Drama of Flying Flowers~ (ビルシャナ戦姫～源平飛花戯曲～, Birushana Senki ~Genpei Hika Gikyoku~) was performed at Hikosen Theater from November 15 to 24, 2025.

Cast
Character	Actor
Shanao	Akari Kawasaki
Taira no Tomomori	Yusei Hiraga
Minamoto no Yoritomo	Kodai Kurihara
Taira no Noritsune	Ryunosuke Nagashima
Musashibo Benkei	Shota Onuma
Shungen	Shoichiro Oumi
Taira no Shigehira	Hinata Matsumoto
