= Charade Maniacs =

2018 video game

- Developer: Otomate (Idea Factory)
- Publishers: JP: Idea Factory; NA/EU: Idea Factory International
- Platforms: PlayStation Vita, Nintendo Switch, iOS, Android
- Release: PlayStation Vita: JP: August 9, 2018; Nintendo Switch: JP: September 16, 2021; NA/EU: June 27, 2023; iOS, Android: JP: October 27, 2022
- Genres: Visual novel, otome game
- Mode: Single-player

Charade Maniacs is a 2018 otome game and visual novel developed and published by Otomate/Idea Factory. It was released for the PlayStation Vita in Japan in 2018, released for the Nintendo Switch in Japan in 2021, released for mobile devices in Japan in 2022, and released in English for the Nintendo Switch in 2023.

== Plot ==
In the 22nd century, a teenage girl named Hiyori Sena is taken to an unknown location with nine other people, where they are forced to participate in the Other World Stream, a mysterious livestream whose cast members must act in fictional dramas. In order to return home, the cast members must either work together to identify the Producer hiding among them or individually earn Stream Points so they can request to leave.

== Gameplay ==
As Charade Maniacs is a visual novel, gameplay consists of reading dialogue and occasionally making choices that determine the events of the plot and the protagonist's relationships with other characters. Additional features include a flowchart of the various paths the story can take, a glossary, and a gallery of unlocked art and videos.

== Reception ==
Reception

Aggregate score
Aggregator	Score
Metacritic	69/100

Review scores
Publication	Score
Nintendo World Report	7/10
RPGFan	79/100
Digitally Downloaded	3.5/5
Pocket Tactics	7/10

Charade Maniacs received "mixed or average" reviews, according to the review aggregator website Metacritic.
