= Cupid Parasite =

2020 video game

- Developer: Otomate (Idea Factory)
- Publishers: JP: Idea Factory; WW: Idea Factory International
- Platform: Nintendo Switch
- Release: Nintendo Switch: JP: August 20, 2020; NA: November 2, 2021; EU: November 5, 2021; Microsoft Windows: NA/EU: September 22, 2026
- Genres: Visual novel, otome game
- Mode: Single-player

Cupid Parasite is an otome game and visual novel developed and published by Idea Factory. It was released for the Nintendo Switch on August 20, 2020 in Japan, and November 2021 in western regions. A fan disc titled Cupid Parasite: Sweet and Spicy Darling was released on November 30, 2023 in Japan, and May 28, 2024 in the west. Idea Factory International released a PC port of Cupid Parasite through Steam on September 22, 2026. The soundtrack CD "Cupid Parasite LosYork DREAM" was released by Capriccio Music Records on September 24, 2020.

== Plot ==
The game follows Lynette Mirror, a matchmaker who is secretly the goddess Cupid, having left Celestia to complete a divine mission on Earth. One day, she is tasked with creating a reality television series about the Parasite 5, a group of men who are infamously "hopeless" with romance.

== Adaptation ==
A stage play based on the game was performed in November 2021.

== Reception ==
Reception

Aggregate scores
Aggregator	Score
Metacritic	83/100
OpenCritic	79% recommend

Review scores
Publication	Score
Famitsu	33/40
Nintendo World Report	6.5/10
RPGFan	88/100
Digitally Downloaded	5/5
Siliconera	7/10

The game received "generally favorable" reviews, according to the review aggregation website Metacritic. Fellow review aggregator OpenCritic assessed that the game received "mighty" approval, being recommended by 79% of critics.
