= Voltage (company) =

Japanese video game company

Voltage Inc.
- Native name: ボルテージ
- Industry: Visual Novel
- Founded: September 1999
- Headquarters: Tokyo, Japan
- Subsidiaries: Voltage Entertainment USA
- Website: www.voltage.co.jp/en/

Voltage Inc. is a Japanese developer and publisher of interactive story apps, such as visual novels and otome games, for iOS and Android devices. They also previously developed games with their San Francisco based subsidiary Voltage Entertainment USA.

== History ==
The company originated in 1999, based in Tokyo, and began to expand to English-speaking audiences in 2011, releasing English-language versions of their games through the Apple Store and Google Play. They went on to establish a US subsidiary company, Voltage Entertainment USA, in 2012. Expanded versions of several of their games were previously released through GREE, however support for the GREE platform ceased in 2014.

Voltage's American subsidiary, Voltage Entertainment USA, have released adaptations of existing Voltage games which have been localized to appeal to Western audiences. Beginning in 2013, the subsidiary began producing original games marketed directly to their English-speaking audience. By 2014, it was reported that Voltage had an audience of 22 million across all its games. In 2017, Voltage Entertainment USA launched the multi-series app Lovestruck: Choose Your Romance and transitioned its AmeMix series into the app. In July 2020, Voltage Entertainment USA's writing staff went on strike and won increased wages and greater workplace transparency.

In December 2021, Voltage announced they would be shutting down Voltage Entertainment USA in 2022 to allocate resources more efficiently. In September 2024, Voltage founded AmuLit, a new publishing imprint and brand for their original console games, with The Red Bell's Lament as the first to be published under AmuLit in 2025.

== Games ==
Name	Release date(s)	Platform(s)
Celebrity Darling	2008	Android, IOS
Love Letter from Thief X	2011; 7 Sep. 2020 (Switch)	Android, IOS, Switch
My Forged Wedding	2011; 17 Sep. 2020 (Switch)	Android, IOS, Switch
My Sweet Bodyguard	2011	Android, IOS
Pirates in Love	2011	Android, IOS
Be My Princess	2012	Android, IOS
Kiss of Revenge	2012	Android, IOS
Class Trip Crush	2012	Android, IOS
A Knight's Devotion	2012	Android, IOS
Seduced in the Sleepless City	2012; 20 Oct. 2022 (Switch)	Android, IOS, Switch
In Your Arms Tonight	2012	Android, IOS
Metro PD: Close to You	2013	Android, IOS
10 Days with My Devil	2013	Android, IOS
Our Two Bedroom Story	2013; 5 July 2020 (Switch)	Android, IOS, Switch
Kissed by the Baddest Bidder	2013; 28 Nov. 2019 (Switch)	Android, IOS, Switch
Serendipity Next Door	2013	Android, IOS
Dreamy Days in West Tokyo	2013	Android, IOS
Office Secrets	2013	Android, IOS
Star-Crossed Myth	2014; 29 Aug. 2019 (Switch); 22 Mar. 2023 (Steam)	Android, IOS, Switch, Steam
Scandal in the Spotlight	2014; 25 Mar. 2021 (Switch)	Android, IOS, Switch
Sakura Amidst Chaos	2014	Android, IOS
Enchanted in the Moonlight	2014; 13 Jun. 2019 (Switch); 22 Mar. 2023 (Steam)	Android, IOS, Switch, Steam
Kiss Me on Clover Hill	2014	Android, IOS
True Love Sweet Lies	2014	Android, IOS
Be My Princess 2	2014	Android, IOS
Finally, in Love Again	2014	Android, IOS
First Love Diaries - A Kiss on the Beach	2014	Android, IOS
My Wedding and 7 Rings	2014	Android, IOS
Her Love in the Force	2014; 21 Jan. 2021 (Switch)	Android, IOS, Switch
Bad Boys Do it Better	2015	Android, IOS
My Last First Kiss	2015; 25 Nov. 2021 (Switch)	Android, IOS, Switch
Butler Until Midnight	2015	Android, IOS
Gossip Girl: Style Your Love	2015	Android, IOS
After School Affairs	2016	Android, IOS
Era of Samurai: Code of Love	2016	Android, IOS
Liar! Uncover the Truth	2016	Android, IOS
Dangerous Seduction	2016	Android, IOS
Irresistible Mistakes	2017; 18 Aug. 2022 (Switch)	Android, IOS, Switch
When Destiny Comes Knocking	2017	Android, IOS
Rose in the Embers	2017	Android, IOS
Our Private Homeroom	2017	Android, IOS
Kings of Paradise	2017; 27 May 2021 (Switch)	Android, IOS, Switch
In Your Arms Tonight Season 2	2018	Android, IOS
Love Brings you Home	2018	Android, IOS
Masquerade Kiss	2018	Android, IOS
A World with(out) You	2018	Android, IOS
Ayakashi: Romance Reborn	2018; 3 Apr. 2021 (Switch)	Android, IOS, Switch
Romance MD: Always On Call	2019	Android, IOS
Destined Mr.Almost Right	2019	Android, IOS
Love's Hella Punk	2020	Android, IOS

=== AmuLit ===
Name	Release date(s)	Platform(s)
even if TEMPEST	6 Sep 2022	Switch
even if TEMPEST: Dawning Connections	26 Oct 2023	Switch
The Red Bell’s Lament	5 June 2025	Switch
Neon Clash: Echoes of the Lost	11 Dec 2025	Switch
sins of KALEIDO	16 July 2026	Switch
Re:cord NOAH Fractal of Oblivion	2026	Switch

=== Voltage Entertainment USA ===
==== Adaptations ====
Year	Name	Adaptation of:
2012	My Lover's a Thief	Love Letter from Thief X
2013	My Killer Romance	10 Days with My Devil
2013	White Lies & Sweet Nothings	My Forged Wedding
2013	Knight of My Heart	A Knight's Devotion
2013	Intimate Business	Office Secrets
2013	Glass Stilettos in Manhattan	Seduced in the Sleepless City
2013	To Love & Protect	My Sweet Bodyguard

==== Original titles ====
Year	Name
2013	Speakeasy Tonight
2014	Queen's Gambit
2015	Astoria: Fate's Kiss (Note: Originally titled Labyrinths of Astoria.)
2016	Kisses & Curses
2016	Gangsters in Love
2016	Castaway! Love's Adventure
2017	Love & Legends
2017	Starship Promise
2017	Havenfall Is For Lovers
2018	Villainous Nights
2018	Astoria: Lost Kisses
2018	Sweet Enchantments
2019	Queen of Thieves
2019	Sin With Me
2019	Reigning Passions
2020	Wicked Lawless Love
2020	Tales of the Wild
2020	Ever After Academy
2021	Immortal Heart Society
2021	My Siren Crush
2021	Edge Case Love’s Pursuit

== Augmented and virtual reality ==
Voltage Inc. has a subsidiary, Voltage VR Inc. Their first app, "Let's Snuggle! AR" allows users to interact and talk with characters from other Voltage romance titles in a more personal setting.

Year	Name	Genre
2017	Let’s Snuggle! AR	Augmented Reality
2017	Intimate VR: Eisuke	Virtual Reality
