= Angelique (video game series) =

Japanese video game series

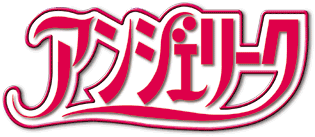
- The Angelique series logo.

- Angelique
- Angelique Limoges (left) and Rosalia de Catargena (right) on the image of the Super Famicom cartridge surface of the first Angelique video game.

アンジェリーク (Anjeri-ku)
- Genre: Otome, strategy, simulation
- Video game

Angelique
- Developer: Ruby Party
- Publisher: KOEI, NEC Home Electronics
- Genre: Otome, dating sim, visual novel
- Platform: Super Famicom,
- Released: JP: September 23, 1994
- Video game

Angelique Voice Fantasy
- Developer: Ruby Party
- Publisher: KOEI, NEC Home Electronics
- Genre: Otome, dating sim, visual novel
- Platform: Super Famicom,
- Released: JP: March 29, 1996
- Video game

Angelique Special
- Developer: Ruby Party
- Publisher: KOEI
- Genre: Otome, dating sim, visual novel
- Platform: NEC PC-FX, PC, Sega Saturn, PlayStation
- Released: JP: December 22, 1995; JP: March 29, 1996
- Video game

Angelique Special 2
- Developer: Ruby Party
- Publisher: KOEI
- Genre: Otome, dating sim, visual novel
- Platform: NEC PC-FX, PC, Sega Saturn, PlayStation
- Released: JP: December 6, 1996
- Video game

Angelique Duet
- Developer: Ruby Party
- Publisher: KOEI
- Genre: Otome, dating sim, visual novel
- Platform: PlayStation, Sega Saturn, Nintendo DS
- Released: JP: July 30, 1998; JP: February 2006
- Video game

Angelique Trois
- Developer: Ruby Party
- Publisher: KOEI
- Genre: Otome, dating sim, visual novel
- Released: JP: November 22, 2000
- Video game

Angelique Etoile
- Developer: Ruby Party
- Publisher: KOEI
- Genre: Otome, dating sim, visual novel
- Released: JP: 2003
- Video game

Angelique: Tenkuu no Requiem
- Developer: Ruby Party
- Publisher: KOEI
- Genre: Otome, RPG
- Platform: PlayStation, Sega Saturn, NEC PC-FX
- Released: JP: April 2, 1998
- Video game

Sweet Ange
- Developer: Ruby Party
- Publisher: KOEI
- Genre: Otome, simulation
- Platform: Game Boy Color
- Released: JP: December 17, 1999
- Video game

Fushigi no Kuni no Angelique
- Developer: Ruby Party
- Publisher: KOEI
- Genre: Otome, board game, dating sim
- Platform: NEC PC-FX, PC, Sega Saturn, Sony PlayStation, Game Boy Advance
- Released: JP: October 11, 1996
- Video game

Angelique: Maren no Roku Kishi
- Developer: Ruby Party
- Publisher: Idea Factory
- Genre: Otome, dating sim, visual novel
- Platform: PlayStation Portable
- Released: JP: November 17, 2011
- Video game

Angelique Retour
- Developer: Ruby Party
- Publisher: Koei Tecmo
- Genre: Otome, dating sim, visual novel
- Platform: PlayStation Portable, PlayStation Vita
- Released: JP: December 17, 2015
- Video game

Angelique Luminarise
- Developer: Ruby Party
- Publisher: Koei Tecmo
- Genre: Otome, dating sim, visual novel
- Platform: Nintendo Switch
- Released: JP: May 20, 2021

Angelique (アンジェリーク, Anjerīku) is a Japanese otome game series and media franchise. There are various OVAs, Drama CDs, Music CDs and Anime series, developed along with the base game, or broadcast on TV channels, etc. The series began in 1994 and has continued since. The latest entry in the series is Angelique Luminarise, released in 2021.

The first game was released in 1994 on Super Famicom. This is the first otome game (dating sim for women) known in the world. The Angelique series is also the first otome game series of the Neo Romance series by Ruby Party. Currently, the games in this series are only published in Japanese.

== Plot ==
The basic lore of the series is built around a Queen who fairly and wisely rules a Universe. By balancing elemental forces with the help of nine Guardians, she keeps the various planets in her domain stable and her people content. However, the powers of the Queen and the Guardians fade over time, and successors must be appointed. In the first game Angelique, the protagonist is a 17-year-old girl named Angelique Limoges who has been chosen by the current Queen and her aide Dia as one of two candidates from the Royal Smallney Girls' Academy to become the next Queen. She is transported to the Flying City to begin her final examination.

Each of the candidates is given a land to populate. Whoever finishes populating their land first wins and becomes the next Queen. It is done with the help of nine Guardians who use their powers to make the people of the candidate's land happy, or to devastate their rival's lands. Along the way, the candidates become friends with the Guardians and can fall in love. If they choose love, they forfeit their chance to become Queen, but will live happily ever after.

The story expands in later titles, but most entries in the series feature a girl named Angelique or a variant thereof (Enju or Ange) as the protagonist, with ever larger casts of characters. The roster of potential love interests swells to 19 characters in later titles (in Angelique Trois and Angelique Etoile).

== Gameplay ==
Through the Angelique series games, the story begins with some crisis of the Universe, or some troubles in the Universe. To resolve a crisis or troubles, one girl is selected to become a savior of these crisis or troubles.

The player takes on the role of this girl. In the first game, Angelique, the player becomes a candidate for the new queen who will be the savior of the universal crisis. The player is asked to complete her mission or task during the course of the game. If the player completes her mission in the scheduled period, before her rival candidate completes the mission, the player will win and become the new queen.

But while trying to complete the given mission or task, the player necessarily needs some help from the nine guardians, who know and control the spiritual powers of the universe. The player needs to win their favor. If they do not favor a player, they will not provide assistance to that player. To win favor from the guardians, the player should properly work in her mission. Thus, the guardians may favor her.

And when the player wins favor of the guardians and the male characters, she will be able to better perform her task, and at the same time, she is capable of establishing romantic relations with some of the male characters. At this point, there are two options for her. Working best in her mission with the help of the guardians, she can defeat her rival, and become the new queen. The other option is for her to fall in love with one of her favourite male characters. If her love is fulfilled, her rival will become the new queen instead, but she may win the love.

These are two main types of endings to this game.

1. Queen ending
2. Love ending

In the other games of this series, there is no rival, and the player should perform her mission alone. While trying to complete her mission or task, the same situations take place. To perform her task, the player needs the help of the guardians and other male characters, and she should win their favor. In this case, there are typically two endings, as in the first game:

1. Mission complete ending
2. Love fulfilled ending
3. Other ending

There are many candidates for romance. Typically, the nine guardians are all possible targets of the player's love. There are at least ten main endings, but there are other endings as well, where the mission and/or the romance may be broken. The number of endings ranges between 10 and 30.

The most interesting and difficult points of this game series are that there are many combinations of how to win favor from the guardians and how to complete the task. Sometimes the former and the latter are contradictory, yet the player needs them both to achieve good endings.

== Characters ==
The major characters appeared in the otome games: Angelique 1994, 1995 (Special), Angelique Special 2 1995, Angelique Trois 2000, Angelique Etoile 2003, and Angelique Luminarise (Anmina) 2021.

Legend:

- "Etoile+" indicates: Both in game Angelique Etoile and anime Koisuru tenshi Angelique.
- "Etoile anim" indicates: In anime Koisuru tenshi Angelique.
- "Etoile" indicates: In game Angelique Etoile.

Name	Version	Position	Role	Universe	Age	Voiced by
Angelique Limoges (アンジェリーク・リモージュ)	Angelique	Protagonist	Candidate for 256th queen	Original	17	(no voice)
Angelique Limoges (アンジェリーク・リモージュ)	Special 2	-	256th Queen of the universe	Original	17	Yuri Shiratori
Angelique Limoges (アンジェリーク・リモージュ)	3rd Trois	-	256th Queen of the universe	Original	17	Yuri Shiratori
Angelique Limoges (アンジェリーク・リモージュ)	4th Etoile+	-	256th Queen of the Shinchō	Shinchō	17	Yuri Shiratori
Rosalia de Catargena (ロザリア・デ・カタルヘナ)	Angelique	Rival	Candidate for 256th queen	Original	17	Kotono Mitsuishi
Rosalia de Catargena (ロザリア・デ・カタルヘナ)	Special 2	-	Aide of the queen Limoges	Original	17	Kotono Mitsuishi
Rosalia de Catargena (ロザリア・デ・カタルヘナ)	3rd Trois	-	Aide of the queen Limoges	Original	17	Kotono Mitsuishi
Rosalia de Catargena (ロザリア・デ・カタルヘナ)	4th Etoile+	-	Aide of the queen Limoges	Shinchō	17	Kotono Mitsuishi
Julious (ジュリアス)	Angelique	Target	Guardian of the light	Original	25	Shō Hayami
Julious (ジュリアス)	Special 2	Target	Guardian of the light	Original	25	Shō Hayami
Julious (ジュリアス)	3rd Trois	Target	Guardian of the light	Original	25	Shō Hayami
Julious (ジュリアス)	4th Etoile+	Target	Guardian of the light	Shinchō	25	Shō Hayami
Clavis (クラヴィス)	Angelique	Target	Guardian of the darkness	Original	25	Kaneto Shiozawa
Clavis (クラヴィス)	Special 2	Target	Guardian of the darkness	Original	25	Kaneto Shiozawa
Clavis (クラヴィス)	3rd Trois	Target	Guardian of the darkness	Original	25	Kaneto Shiozawa
Clavis (クラヴィス)	4th Etoile+	Target	Guardian of the darkness	Shinchō	25	Kaneto Shiozawa
Luva (ルヴァ)	Angelique	Target	Guardian of the earth	Original	26	Toshihiko Seki
Luva (ルヴァ)	Special 2	Target	Guardian of the earth	Original	26	Toshihiko Seki
Luva (ルヴァ)	3rd Trois	Target	Guardian of the earth	Original	26	Toshihiko Seki
Luva (ルヴァ)	4th Etoile+	Target	Guardian of the earth	Shinchō	26	Toshihiko Seki
Oscar (オスカー)	Angelique	Target	Guardian of the fire	Original	22	Kenyū Horiuchi
Oscar (オスカー)	Special 2	Target	Guardian of the fire	Original	22	Kenyū Horiuchi
Oscar (オスカー)	3rd Trois	Target	Guardian of the fire	Original	22	Kenyū Horiuchi
Oscar (オスカー)	4th Etoile+	Target	Guardian of the fire	Shinchō	22	Kenyū Horiuchi
Lumiale (リュミエール)	Angelique	Target	Guardian of the water	Original	21	Nobuo Tobita
Lumiale (リュミエール)	Special 2	Target	Guardian of the water	Original	21	Nobuo Tobita
Lumiale (リュミエール)	3rd Trois	Target	Guardian of the water	Original	21	Nobuo Tobita
Lumiale (リュミエール)	4th Etoile	Target	Guardian of the water	Shinchō	21	Nobuo Tobita
Olivie (オリヴィエ)	Angelique	Target	Guardian of the dream	Original	22	Takehito Koyasu
Olivie (オリヴィエ)	Special 2	Target	Guardian of the dream	Original	22	Takehito Koyasu
Olivie (オリヴィエ)	3rd Trois	Target	Guardian of the dream	Original	22	Takehito Koyasu
Olivie (オリヴィエ)	4th Etoile+	Target	Guardian of the dream	Shinchō	22	Takehito Koyasu
Randy (ランディ)	Angelique	Target	Guardian of the wind	Original	18	Nobutoshi Canna
Randy (ランディ)	Special 2	Target	Guardian of the wind	Original	18	Nobutoshi Canna
Randy (ランディ)	3rd Trois	Target	Guardian of the wind	Original	18	Nobutoshi Canna
Randy (ランディ)	4th Etoile+	Target	Guardian of the wind	Shinchō	18	Nobutoshi Canna
Zephel (ゼフェル)	Angelique	Target	Guardian of the steel	Original	17	Mitsuo Iwata
Zephel (ゼフェル)	Special 2	Target	Guardian of the steel	Original	17	Mitsuo Iwata
Zephel (ゼフェル)	3rd Trois	Target	Guardian of the steel	Original	17	Mitsuo Iwata
Zephel (ゼフェル)	4th Etoile+	Target	Guardian of the steel	Shinchō	17	Mitsuo Iwata
Marcel (マルセル)	Angelique	Target	Guardian of the green	Original	14	Hiro Yūki
Marcel (マルセル)	Special 2	Target	Guardian of the green	Original	14	Hiro Yūki
Marcel (マルセル)	3rd Trois	Target	Guardian of the green	Original	14	Hiro Yūki
Marcel (マルセル)	4th Etoile+	Target	Guardian of the green	Shinchō	14	Hiro Yūki
Angelique (アンジェリーク)	Angelique	-	255th Queen of the universe	Original	21	Masako Katsuki
Dia (ディア)	Angelique	-	Aide of the queen Angelique	Original	21	Atsuko Tanaka
Name	Version	Position	Role	Universe	Age	Voiced by
Angelique Collet (アンジェリーク・コレット)	Special 2	Protagonist	Candidate for new universe queen	Original	17	(no voice)
Angelique Collet (アンジェリーク・コレット)	3rd Trois	Protagonist	1st Queen of new universe	Original	17	(no voice)
Angelique Collet (アンジェリーク・コレット)	4th Etoile+	-	1st Queen of the Seijū	Seijū	17	Yoko Asada
Rachel Hart (レイチェル・ハート)	Special 2	Rival	Candidate for new universe queen	Original	16	Miki Nagasawa
Rachel Hart (レイチェル・ハート)	3rd Trois	-	Aide of the queen Collet	Original	16	Miki Nagasawa
Rachel Hart (レイチェル・ハート)	4th Etoile+	-	Aide of the queen Collet	Seijū	16	Miki Nagasawa
Alphonsia (アルフォンシア)	Special 2	-	The will of new universe	New universe	-	-
Alphonsia (アルフォンシア)	3rd Trois	-	(Mysterious Elda)	New universe	-	-
Alphonsia (アルフォンシア)	Etoile	-	(Male form spirit)	Seijū	16	Mitsuru Miyamoto
Elda (エルダ)	3rd Trois	-	The missed one (Sealed spirit)	New universe	-	-
Leonard (レオナード)	4th Etoile+	Target	Guardian of the light	Seijū	27	Rikiya Koyama
Francis (フランシス)	4th Etoile+	Target	Guardian of the darkness	Seijū	23	Tomokazu Sugita
Victor (ヴィクトール)	Special 2	Target	Tutor of the spirit	Original	31	Fumihiko Tachiki
Victor (ヴィクトール)	3rd Trois	Target	Tutor of the spirit	Original	34	Fumihiko Tachiki
Victor (ヴィクトール)	4th Etoile+	Target	Guardian of the earth	Seijū	34	Fumihiko Tachiki
Charlie Won (チャーリー)	Special 2	Target	Collaborator	Original	23	Mitsuaki Madono
Charlie Won (チャーリー)	3rd Trois	Target	Collaborator	Original	26	Mitsuaki Madono
Charlie Won (チャーリー)	4th Etoile+	Target	Guardian of the fire	Seijū	26	Mitsuaki Madono
Timka (ティムカ)	Special 2	Target	Tutor of the dignity	Original	13	Atsushi Kisaichi
Timka (ティムカ)	3rd Trois	Target	Tutor of the dignity	Original	16	Atsushi Kisaichi
Timka (ティムカ)	4th Etoile+	Target	Guardian of the water	Seijū	16	Atsushi Kisaichi
Mel (メル)	Special 2	Target	Collaborator	Original	15	Yumi Tōma
Mel (メル)	3rd Trois	Target	Collaborator	Original	18	Yumi Tōma
Mel (メル)	4th Etoile+	Target	Guardian of the dream	Seijū	18	Yumi Tōma
Heuye (ユーイ)	4th Etoile+	Target	Guardian of the wind	Seijū	17	Daisuke Namikawa
Ernst (エルンスト)	Special 2	Target	Collaborator	Original	27	Toshiyuki Morikawa
Ernst (エルンスト)	3rd Trois	Target	Collaborator	Original	30	Toshiyuki Morikawa
Ernst (エルンスト)	4th Etoile+	Target	Guardian of the steel	Seijū	30	Toshiyuki Morikawa
Sei-lan (セイラン)	Special 2	Target	Tutor of the sensibility	Original	19	Tetsuya Iwanaga
Sei-lan (セイラン)	3rd Trois	Target	Tutor of the sensibility	Original	22	Tetsuya Iwanaga
Sei-lan (セイラン)	4th Etoile+	Target	Guardian of the green	Seijū	22	Tetsuya Iwanaga
Arios (アリオス)	3rd Trois	Target	Mysterious man	Original	28	Ken Narita
Arios (アリオス)	4th Etoile+	Target	Shadow of the queen (Collet)	Unknown	28	Ken Narita
Name	Version	Position	Role	Universe	Age	Voiced by
Ange (Enju); Sakaki (エンジュ・サカキ)	4th Etoile	Protagonist	Legendary Etoile	Both universes	17	(no voice)
Ange (Enju); Sakaki (エンジュ・サカキ)	Etoile_anim	Protagonist	Legendary Etoile	Both universes	17	Yōko Honna
Constantan (タンタン)	4th Etoile+	-	Spirit of the monolith	Both universes	?	-
Conrad (コンラッド)	4th Etoile	-	Captain of space-ship	Seijū	46	-
Sacrea no seirei (サクリアの精霊)	Etoile_anim	-	Spirit of the sacrea	Seijū	?	Akimitsu Takase / Eri Ōno
Moira (モイラ)	Etoile_anim	-	Cosmic mind of Ange	Seijū	?	Yōko Honna
Name	Version	Position	Role	Universe	Age	Voiced by
Ange (アンジュ)	Anmina	Protagonist	Candidate for new queen	Reikyō	25	(no voice)
Reina (レイナ)	Anmina	Rival	Candidate for new queen	Reikyō	25	Ryōko Shiraishi
Yue (ユエ)	Anmina	Target	Guaridian of the light	Reikyō	25	Shimba Tsuchiya
Noah (ノア)	Anmina	Target	Guardian of the darkness	Reikyō	22	Hiroki Nanami
Lorenzo (ロレンツォ)	Anmina	Target	Guaridian of the earth	Reikyō	30	Ryōta Takeuchi
Shuri (シュリ)	Anmina	Target	Guardian of the fire	Reikyō	27	Takuya Satō
Kanata (カナタ)	Anmina	Target	Guardian of the water	Reikyō	18	Takeo Ōtsuka
Felix (フェリクス)	Anmina	Target	Guardian of the dream	Reikyō	25	Yūto Uemura
Vergil (ヴァージル)	Anmina	Target	Guardian of the wind	Reikyō	27	Yu Miyazaki
Xeno (ゼノ)	Anmina	Target	Guardian of the steel	Reikyō	19	Nobunaga Shimazaki
Milan (ミラン)	Anmina	Target	Guardian of the green	Reikyō	26	Shōhei Komatsu
Cyrus (サイラス)	Anmina	-	Butler	Reikyō -	28	Yūki Ono
Taira (タイラー)	Anmina	-	Chief of Royal Institute	Reikyō	25	Fumiya Imai

- In Angelique Etoile, Original universe is called "the universe of Shinchō (神鳥, the Divine Bird)" and New universe is called "the universe of Seijū (聖獣, the Sacred Beast)". Alphonsia is the spirit of New universe. Alphonsia appears in the form of a small animal, thus it is called "seijū".
- In Angelique Luminarise, the stage of the game is the third universe. "The universe of Reikyō (令梟, the Honorable Owl)".

== Titles ==
=== Main series ===
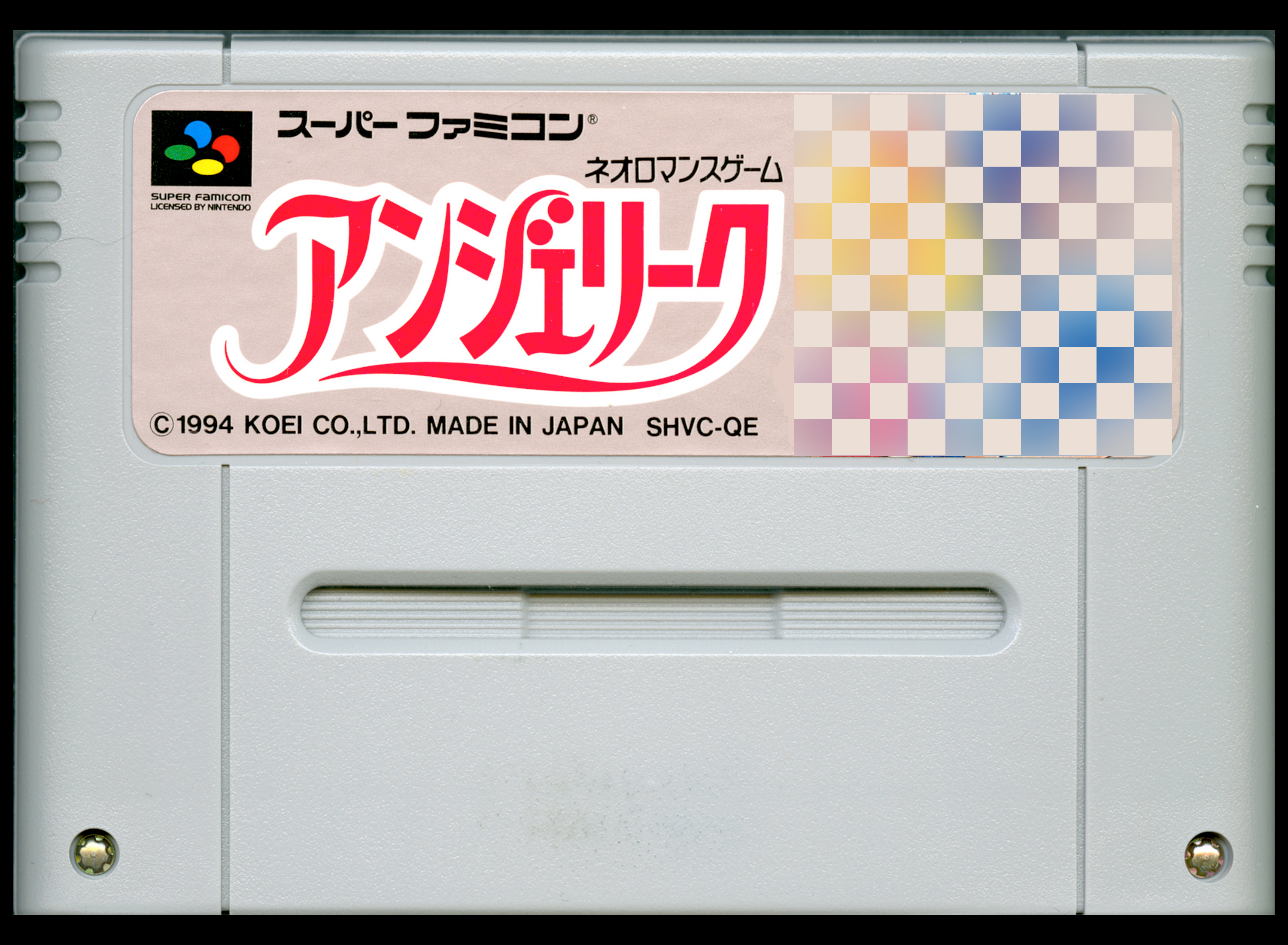
Super Famicom catridge, Angelique 1994, the image at upper right-hand is mosaic censored. This image is shown as the title image at the top.

- Angelique (アンジェリーク)
  First installment in the series developed by Ruby Party. The game follows Angelique Limoges, an ordinary high school girl, is chosen as a queen candidate. With help from the power of the nine Guardians, she aims to be the next Queen. Angelique is generally considered to have popularized the otome game market. Angelique Voice Fantasy, Angelique Special, and Angelique Duet are all different versions of this game. The game was released on September 23, 1994, for Super Famicom. A Game Boy Advance version was released on March 21, 2003. A full remake titled Angelique Retour (アンジェリーク ルトゥール) was released for PlayStation Portable and PlayStation Vita.

- Angelique Special is a revised version of the first game and features several new animated scenes, in addition to voice acting by several big-name voice actors. Among the new animated scenes were several love events that were not present in the original game. Others included the opening sequence and the endings. released on December 22, 1995, for PC-FX and published by NEC Home Electronics. The game was ported to PC, Sega Saturn, and PlayStation on March 29, 1996.

- Angelique Voice Fantasy included a special Audio CD and an add-on called Voicer-kun, which allowed for the addition of voice acting. The game contents are otherwise identical to the original version. It was released on March 29, 1996, for Super Famicom.

- Angelique Duet was released on July 30, 1998, for Sega Saturn and PlayStation. The game was ported to the Nintendo DS in February 2006 This version allows the player to choose the usual heroine, Angelique Limoges, or her rival Rosalia de Catargena, as the main character. The DS version introduced a messaging feature.

- Angelique Retour (アンジェリーク ルトゥール), a full remake with new artwork as well as two new characters, was released for PlayStation Portable and PlayStation Vita on December 17, 2015.

- Angelique Special 2 (アンジェリークSpecial2)
  Second installment in the series. Angelique Collet, a girl who lives in the universe that the heroine of the first game now rules, is chosen as a queen candidate for a new universe. The count of male characters increases to include the nine Guardians, as well as three Tutors and three Collaborators.
- Angelique Trois (アンジェリーク トロワ)
  Third installment in the series. Angelique Collet, now queen of a new universe, is drawn into a pocket universe, Arcadia, with the rest of the Angelique Special 2 cast. She develops the wilderness of Arcadia in order to free Elda, a strange being she finds there.
- Angelique Etoile (アンジェリーク エトワール)
  Fourth installment in the series. The main character is a girl from the universe ruled by Angelique Limoges named Ange, who must save the new universe (the Seojū universe) as the "Legendary Etoile". Includes all of the major characters from previous Angelique titles, plus three new "Seijū Universe" Guardians.
- Angelique Luminarise (アンジェリーク ルミナライズ)
  The first Nintendo Switch installment of the series, scheduled for release on May 20, 2021. The main character is a 25-year-old single office worker. It is the first new entry in the main Angelique series in 18 years.

=== Spin-offs ===
- Angelique Tenkū no Requiem (アンジェリーク 天空の鎮魂歌)

A traditional role-playing video game with dating sim events and multiple endings. Angelique Collet is the heroine. The universe which Angelique Limoges rules is under attack from a mysterious figure called the "emperor", and Angelique Collet must come to the rescue.

- Fushigi no Kuni no Angelique (ふしぎの国のアンジェリーク)
  Angelique Limoges is the main character. The goal is to explore the Flying City to find the Guardian's tea party. Though a board game, it has dating sim events and multiple endings.
- Sweet Ange (スウィートアンジェ)
  Features the first two heroines, their rivals, the nine Guardians and the tutors and collaborators as students attending the same high school. The goal is to make dessert dishes and get rewards for them. Though a board game, it has dating sim events and multiple endings.
- Angelique Maren no Roku Kishi (アンジェリーク 魔恋の六騎士) for PlayStation Portable

=== Games in non-Japanese language ===
As of May 2022, the game series has been released exclusively in Japanese, except for a Chinese PC version of the first game in 1994. Although KOEI is not opposed to releasing the games in other language(s) than Japanese, in order for such translations to be produced, the existence of enough demand must be shown.

== Related media ==
=== Software ===
- The first game series (Angelique 1994, Angelique Special 1995)
  - Angelique Bijutsukan (Angelique Museum) (アンジェリーク美術館): Released on July 21, 1995. Desktop accessories for Windows and Macintosh.
  - Letter Kōbō Angelique Post Clip (Letter Workshop Angelique Post Clip) (レター工房アンジェリークポストクリップ): Released in 1996. Multi-letter printing software for Windows 95.
  - Angelique Screen Cocktail (アンジェリークスクリーンカクテル): Released on January 31, 1997. Desktop accessories for Windows 95.
  - Angelique Love Love Mail (アンジェリークラブラブメール): Released on October 27, 2000. Email software for Windows95/98/Me and MacOS8.1/9.

=== OVA ===
- Angelique (Special, part 1, 2, 3) (アンジェリーク（スペシャル・上・中・下）) (Clavis: Hideyuki Tanaka)

=== Manga ===
- Angelique Serialized in Monthly Asuka by Kadokawa Shoten in 1996. This manga series was published as ten tankobon books series. Artist is Kairi Yura (由羅カイリ) who is the character designer of the game series Angelique.
- Guruguru Angelique (ぐるぐるアンジェリーク) (J.O. Oda)
- Angelique Retour (アンジェリーク ルトゥール). two volumes tankobon.
- Sengoku Angelique (戦国アンジェリーク), a 2010 spinoff published in B's LOG Comic Kyun

=== Anime, OVA series ===
There are 4 OVA series:

1. OVA 1 - Angelique: Shiroi Tsubasa no Memoire (アンジェリーク 白い翼のメモワール) (2000; 2 episodes) - sequel to game events
2. OVA 2 - Angelique: Seichi yori Ai o Komete (アンジェリーク 聖地より愛をこめて) (2001; 3 episodes)
3. OVA 3 - Angelique Twin Collection (アンジェリークTWINコレクション) (2002; 8 episodes)
4. OVA 4 - Angelique (オリジナルビデオアニメーション アンジェリーク) (2004; 3 episodes) - based on video game; first series chronologically, prequel to Shiroi Tsubasa no Memoire

Angelique Limoges and Rosalia de Catargena have been chosen as candidates in a Queen Examination - a test to see who is better qualified to be the next Queen of the universe. For this special examination, both girls are given their own continent on a planet. The girls must raise the continents into thriving civilizations and environments. Nine Guardians (who control various spiritual elements, such as fire, wind, and water) have been chosen to help the girls raise their continents during the Queen Examination.

=== Anime, Television series spin-offs ===
There was a Koi Suru Tenshi Angelique series (25 episodes) from 2006 to 2007.

1. Koi suru Tenshi Angelique: Kokoro no Mezameru Toki (恋する天使アンジェリーク 〜心のめざめる時〜) (13 eps) 2006 spinoff of the OVAs
2. Koi suru Tenshi Angelique ~ Kagayaki no Ashita ~ (恋する天使アンジェリーク 〜かがやきの明日〜) (12 eps) 2007 sequel to 2006 series

== CDs ==
=== Vocal and soundtrack CDs ===
- Angelique, Yasashī ai no melody (アンジェリーク 優しい愛のメロディ)
- Angelique, Fallin' love (アンジェリーク FALLIN'LOVE)
- Angelique, Soiree (アンジェリーク SOIREE)
- Angelique, Sing & Talk - Harmonia (アンジェリーク Sing&Talk～ハルモニア)
- Vocal collection, Angelique Luminarise Sparkle! 10 March 2022

=== Drama CDs ===
- Angelique, Hikari to yami no sacrea (アンジェリーク 光と闇のサクリア) (Clavis: Bin Shimada)
- Angelique, Tokimeki no hōseki-bako (アンジェリーク ときめきの宝石箱) (Clavis: Bin Shimada)
- Angelique, Koi wa Push & Push! (アンジェリーク 恋はPUSH&PUSH!)
- Angelique, Anata no hitomi ni yume-tenshi (sweet angel) (アンジェリーク あなたの瞳に夢天使（スウィート・エンジェル）)
- Angelique, Madowase naide sei-shōjo (innocent girl) (アンジェリーク 惑わせないで聖少女（イノセント・ガール）)
- Angelique duet, Hikōtoshi monogatari (アンジェリークデュエット 飛空都市物語)
- Angelique Luminarise, 1st step, 14 October 2020
- Angelique Luminarise, 2nd step, 11 November 2020
- Angelique Luminarise, 3rd step, 2 December 2020

=== Gaiden Drama series ===
- Angelique Gaiden: Infinite Scale (アンジェリーク外伝 無限音階)
- Angelique Gaiden 2: Outline in Crimson (アンジェリーク外伝2 緋の輪郭)
- Angelique Gaiden 3: Mirrors of the Forbidden Land (アンジェリーク外伝3 禁域の鏡)'
- Angelique Gaiden 4: Rainbow Memories (アンジェリーク外伝4 虹の記憶)

== Reception ==
Keiko Erikawa established the woman-based game developing team in the mid-1980s. This resulted in the birth of team Ruby Party and the first otome game Angelique in 1994.

The Angelique series greatly promoted and produced the development of otome games and their franchise markets.

The Angelique games sold over 850,000 copies in 2020. Koei-Tecmo has reported sales of the 2021 game Angelique Luminarise in the 30,000s in Japan and Asia in the first quarter of 2021 (April to June). According to Teitengame.com, the sales ranking of Angelique Luminarise is 132nd, and its total sales in 2021 were 14,506.

== Related game series ==
=== Neo Romance series ===
Neo Romance series is the otome game series developed by the women-based group Ruby Party in KOEI.

1. Angelique series (The otome game series in this article).
2. Harukanaru Toki no Naka de - Second game series of the Neo Romance.
3. Kin'iro no Corda - Third game series of the Neo Romance.
4. Neo Angelique - Fourth game series. This is totally different game from the series Angelique. Neither sequel nor spin-off. According to Ruby Party, the world of the series Angelique is the distant past of the Neo Angelique. Therefore, a bit similar gadgets appear, such that the stage of Neo Angelique is the continent Arcadia, which was the stage of Angelique Trois.

== Bibliography ==
- (ja) Naomi Tanizaki Angelique, Memorial book, 1995–0810, Koei ISBN 4-87719-245-X
- (ja) Naomi Tanizaki Angelique Special, Sweet guide, 1996, Koei ISBN 4-87719-349-9
- (ja) Naomi Tanizaki Angelique Special 2, Sweet guide, 1997, Koei ISBN 4-87719-446-0
- (ja) Naomi Tanizaki, Kio Okita Angelique Special 2, Memorial book, 1997–0930, Koei ISBN 4-87719-505-X
- (ja) Ruby Party ed. Angelique Trois, Sweet guide, 2000, Koei ISBN 4-87719-848-2
- (ja) Ruby Party ed. Angelique Trois, Memorial book, I, 2001–0707, Koei ISBN 4-87719-889-X
- (ja) Ruby Party ed. Angelique Trois, Memorial book, II, 2001–0904, Koei ISBN 4-87719-890-3
- (ja) Ruby Party ed. Angelique Etoile, Official guide, 2003–1230, Koei ISBN 4-7758-0143-0
- (ja) Ruby Party ed. Angelique Etoile, Handbook, 2004–0129, Koei ISBN 4-7758-0155-4
- (ja) Ruby Party ed. Angelique Etoile, Memorial book, 2005–0319, Koei ISBN 4-7758-0295-X
- (ja) Ruby Party ed. Neo Angelique, Memorial book, 2008, Koei ISBN 978-4-7758-0664-7
