= Koei Tecmo =

Japanese entertainment holding company

Koei Tecmo Holdings Co., Ltd.

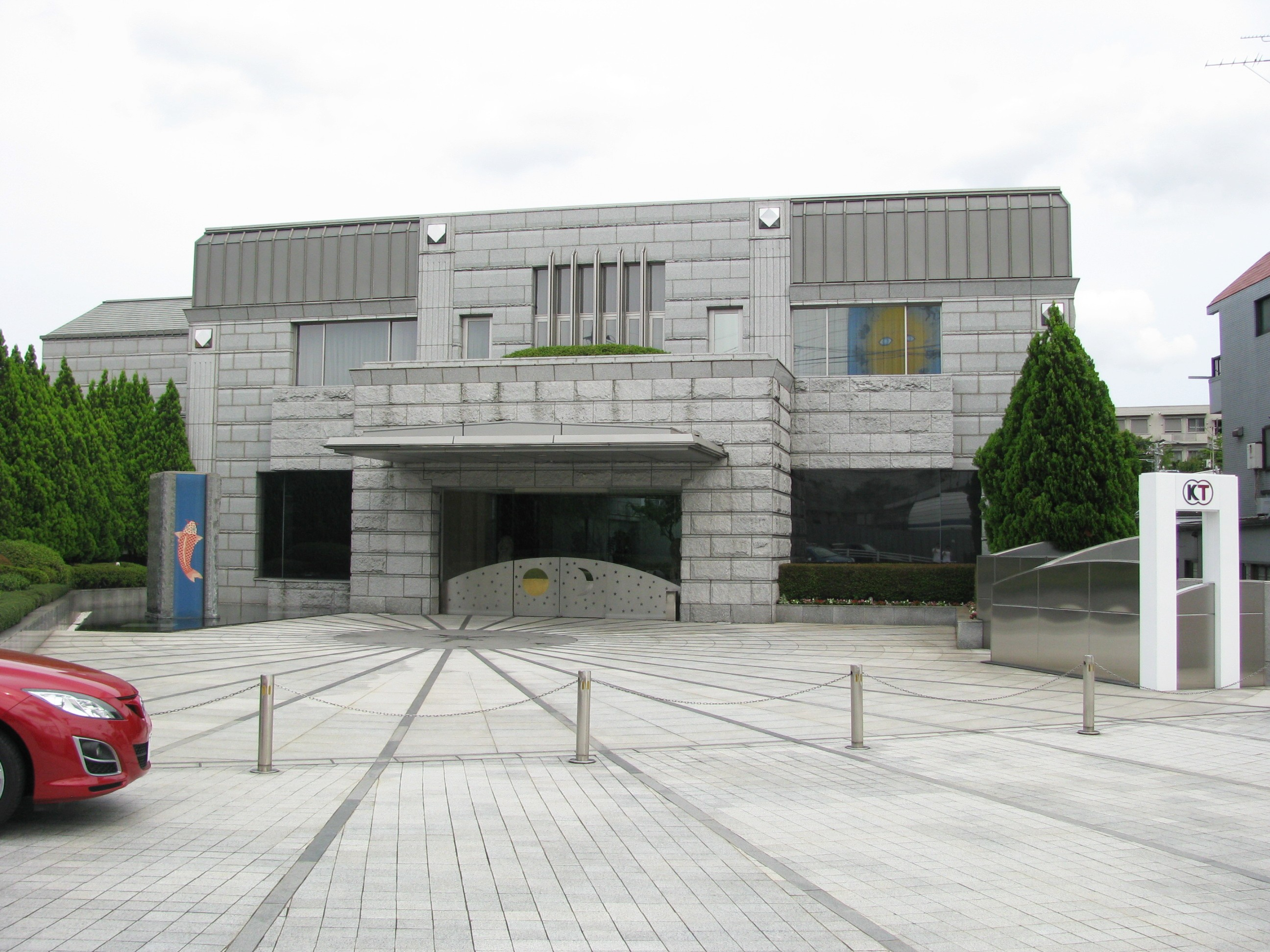
- Headquarters in Kōhoku-ku, Yokohama
- Native name: 株式会社コーエーテクモホールディングス
- Romanized name: Kabushikigaisha Kōē Tekumo Hōrudingusu
- Formerly: Tecmo Koei Holdings Co., Ltd. (2009-2014)
- Type: Public
- Traded as: TYO: 3635
- Industry: Video games, anime, amusement
- Predecessors: Koei; Tecmo
- Founded: April 1, 2009; 17 years ago (as Tecmo Koei Holdings)
- Headquarters: Kōhoku-ku, Yokohama, Kanagawa Prefecture, Japan
- Area served: Worldwide
- Key people: Hisashi Koinuma (CEO & President); Yōichi Erikawa (Chairman); Keiko Erikawa (Chairman Emeretus)
- Products: List of Koei Tecmo games
- Revenue: ▲¥84.5 billion (2023)
- Operating income: ▼¥28.4 billion (2023)
- Net income: ▲¥33.7 billion (2023)
- Number of employees: 2,835 (March 2026)
- Divisions: AAA Games Studio; CWS Brains; Koei Tecmo Pictures; Kou Shibusawa; Koei Tecmo Books; Midas; Omega Force; Ruby Party; Team Ninja; Gust
- Subsidiaries: Koei Tecmo Games; Koei Tecmo Wave; Koei Tecmo American Corporation; Koei Tecmo Europe; Koei Tecmo Taiwan; Koei Tecmo Singapore; Koei Tecmo Tianjin Software; Koei Tecmo Beijing Software; Koei Tecmo Software Vietnam; Koei Tecmo Shanghai Entertainment; Koei Tecmo Net; Koei Tecmo Quality Assurance; Koei Tecmo Liv; Koei Tecmo Music; Koei Tecmo Capital
- Website: www.koeitecmo.co.jp

Koei Tecmo Holdings Co., Ltd. (Note: Japanese: 株式会社コーエーテクモホールディングス, Hepburn: Kabushikigaisha Kōē Tekumo Hōrudingusu) is a Japanese video game, amusement and anime holding company created in 2009 by the merger of Koei and Tecmo. The holding company itself, as well as its subsidiaries and divisions, were known as Tecmo Koei until the names were reversed to Koei Tecmo in 2014 without any change to the logo.

Koei Tecmo Holdings owns many companies, the biggest one of them being its flagship video game developer and publisher Koei Tecmo Games that was founded in 1978 as Koei. Since 2010, Koei Tecmo Games has been the owner of the previous Koei and Tecmo franchises, and occasionally used both brand names on new video games for marketing purposes until 2016.

The company is best known for its Atelier, Dead or Alive, Dynasty Warriors, Samurai Warriors, Fatal Frame, Monster Rancher, Ninja Gaiden, Nioh, Nobunaga's Ambition and Romance of the Three Kingdoms franchises. They are also known for its work on external video game franchises, namely on Square Enix's Final Fantasy and Intelligent Systems' Fire Emblem.

== History ==
=== Independent era ===
==== Koei ====
Koei logo

Koei Co., Ltd. (株式会社コーエー Kabushiki gaisha Kōē, formerly 光栄 (Kōei)) was founded in July 1978 by husband-and-wife duo Yōichi and Keiko Erikawa. Yōichi was a student at Keio University, and when his family's rural dyestuffs business failed he decided to pursue his interest in programming. The company was (and, as Koei Tecmo, still is) located in the Hiyoshi area of Yokohama along with Yoichi's alma mater, and the company's name is simply a spoonerism of the school's.

The company initially focused on personal computer sales and made-to-order business software. In 1983 it released Nobunaga's Ambition (信長の野望 Nobunaga no Yabō), a historical strategy game set during the Sengoku period of Japanese history. The game went on to receive numerous awards, and Koei produced several more such games set against the backdrop of world history, including Romance of the Three Kingdoms, set during the Three Kingdoms period of Chinese history, and Uncharted Waters (大航海時代 Dai Kōkai Jidai; lit. Great Navigation Era), set in Portugal during the Age of Exploration.

In 1988, Koei established a North American subsidiary, Koei Corporation, in California. This subsidiary localized Koei games for export to all territories outside Japan, as well as producing original games and concepts with the leadership of designer Stieg Hedlund, like Liberty or Death, Celtic Tales: Balor of the Evil Eye, and Gemfire. After Hedlund's departure, this subsidiary ceased game development in 1995, focusing instead on localization, sales and marketing.

A Canadian subsidiary, Koei Canada, Inc. was established in early 2001, and a European subsidiary, Koei Limited was established in early 2003 in Hertfordshire, United Kingdom. In 2004, a Lithuanian subsidiary was formed.

==== Tecmo ====
Tecmo logo

Tecmo, Ltd., (Note: テクモ, Tekumo) formerly known as Tehkan Ltd., (Note: テーカン, Tēkan) was founded by Yoshihito Kakihara on July 31, 1967, as a supplier of cleaning equipment. Two years later, in 1969, it started to sell amusement equipment. Tecmo had its headquarters in Kudankita, Chiyoda, Tokyo. Tecmo's United States offices were located in Torrance, California.

In March 1981, a U.S. division was inaugurated as U.S. Tehkan, Inc.. A month later, in April 1981, Tehkan released in Japan its first arcade video game titled Pleiades (which was distributed in America by Centuri). When it was still called Tehkan, the company also released such classic games as Bomb Jack and Tehkan World Cup. On January 8, 1986, Tehkan officially changed its name to Tecmo. In 1989 Tecmo was named as co-defendant in a lawsuit, when Indianapolis Colts running back Eric Dickerson sued the NFLPA over use of his likeness in the game Tecmo Bowl.

In January 2006, Tecmo president, Junji Nakamura, resigns from the company while Yoshimi Yasuda was named his successor.

In 2006, Founder Yoshihito Kakihara died of interstitial pneumonia.

On June 3, 2008, Team Ninja head Tomonobu Itagaki resigned from the company and filed a 145 million yen ($1.3 million) lawsuit against Yoshimi Yasuda for "unpaid completion bonuses" and "emotional distress". This was followed by another lawsuit filed on June 16, 2008, by two plaintiffs on behalf of Tecmo's 300 employees for unpaid wages amounting to ¥8.3 million.

=== Merger and reorganization ===
On August 20, 2008, Tecmo announced the resignation of president Yoshimi Yasuda, to be replaced by current chairman of the board Yasuharu Kakihara as of September 1. On August 28, Square Enix announced plans for a friendly takeover of Tecmo by purchasing shares at a 30 percent premium with a total bid of ¥22.3 billion. They gave Tecmo until September 4 to either accept or reject the proposal. Upon hearing this news on August 31, Kenji Matsubara, President and COO of Koei, called a board meeting for the next day, September 1. The board discussed the possibility of a merger with Tecmo, and began discussions with Tecmo that same day. On September 4, 2008, Tecmo officially declined Square Enix's proposal, and later that same day announced plans to merge with Koei.

To survive and compete in this market, we need to have some sort of scale - it's critical. And that's the trigger of this consolidation. Square Enix had made an offer, and we had started a discussion with Tecmo as well. But Tecmo's founding family and Koei's founders' family have actually had a good relationship for many years, which is why we were able to make a deal in such a short time! We started the discussion on September 1st, and it was agreed two days after! Tecmo's founders and management team understands that while it is nice to stand alone, it is risky, and scale is critical.

— Kenji Matsubara

In November, the companies announced their specific plan of action, to complete the merger on April 1, 2009, forming Tecmo Koei Holdings. Koei stock was to be exchanged for Tecmo Koei stock at a rate of 1:1, and Tecmo stock exchanged at .9:1, giving Koei shareholders, in total, a three-quarter stake in the new company. Though the combined profits in 2007 were 8.5 billion yen, they anticipated that the merged company would net over 16 billion yen in the fiscal year ending March 2012. Effissimo Capital Management Pte, Tecmo's second-largest shareholder at 17.6%, openly opposed the merger. On January 26, 2009, the shareholders for both Koei and Tecmo reached separate agreements in favor of the merger. Effissimo raised some dissent during the meeting, and implied it may seek to sell its shares. Effissimo's director Takashi Kosaka stated "We have not had sufficient information from the company to make a judgment on the merger, such as the feasibility of their plan to raise shareholder value." On February 12, Kenji Matsubara liquidated KOEI France SAS. On February 13, Tecmo announced it had received a repurchase claim (a request for the company to buy stock back) from a major shareholder, 15.64% of the stock (3,890,700 shares) from a shareholder that stood in opposition to the firm's upcoming merger with Koei. While the requesting shareholder was not mentioned, Reuters stated that it was likely Effissimo.

Despite these misgivings, the holding company formed on April 1, 2009, as planned. Kenji Matsubara became CEO of the new company, and former Tecmo CEO Yasuharu Kakihara became board chairman. As of May 26, Tecmo Koei had still not reached an agreement with Effissimo, prompting the investment fund to seek mediation with the Tokyo District Court. While Tecmo Koei favored a stock value in the mid-600 yen range, Effissimo was expected to ask for at least 900, in part due to the rejected Square Enix offer of 920 per share.

On June 23, 2009, Tecmo Koei announced a planned restructure of its international subsidiaries. Koei Europe was renamed Tecmo Koei Europe in 2009 and became the first subsidiary to publish games under the new moniker, starting with Ninja Gaiden Sigma 2. In August 2009 Tecmo Koei announced that it was setting up a subsidiary in Hanoi, Vietnam. In January 2010, Tecmo's sole subsidiary, the American Tecmo Inc., and Koei's American branch, Koei Corporation, were moved under a newly formed Tecmo Koei America Corporation, itself a direct subsidiary to Tecmo Koei Holdings. Koei's Canadian, Korean, and Taiwanese subsidiaries were re-branded Tecmo Koei, and also moved to direct subsidiaries of the holding company. Later that month the Entertainment Software Association (ESA) announced that Tecmo Koei was now a member.

On April 1, 2010, Tecmo was declared disbanded in Japan. Koei absorbed Tecmo the same day to become Tecmo Koei Games. The development divisions of both companies were spun-out into separate subsidiaries of Tecmo Koei Games, created specifically for the planning and development of software. Koei Singapore was also re-branded as Tecmo Koei.

=== As Tecmo Koei ===
The continued operating loss prompted Kenji Matsubara, the former president and CEO of both Tecmo Koei Holdings and Tecmo Koei Games label, to render his resignation in November 2010. Yoichi Erikawa, co-founder of Koei, took over the four positions vacated by Matsubara.

On February 8, 2011, Tecmo Koei Holdings announced that the new individual developers Tecmo and Koei that were formed in March 2010 would be merged into Tecmo Koei Games in April 2011, though the company would continue to create games in the future under the Tecmo and Koei brands.

=== As Koei Tecmo ===
On July 1, 2014, the company and its related subsidiaries were renamed from Tecmo Koei to Koei Tecmo.

On February 18, 2016, Koei Tecmo announced a second reorganization of the company, to support the expansion of the company. Brand names Team Tachyon, Koei and Tecmo, amongst others, were dropped.

On February 10, 2025, Koei Tecmo announced that Hisashi Koinuma, who currently serves as the representative director and executive vice president of Koei Tecmo Holdings, will replace Yoichi Erikawa as company president and CEO, effective April 1, 2025. Yoichi Erikawa, co-founder of Koei and more commonly known as Kou Shibusawa, will transition to representative director and chairman of Koei Tecmo Holdings. His wife Keiko Erikawa, also a co-founder, will transition from representative director and chairman to director and chairman emeritus, as well as representative director and president of Koei Tecmo Corporate Finance, which will be established on April 1. Koei Tecmo Corporate Finance will take over the investment functions of Koei Tecmo Games through an absorption-type company split. The move aims to strengthen governance related to investments and improve cash management across the company.

== Koei Tecmo Games Brands ==
=== AAA Games Studio ===
AAA Games Studio was founded under Koei Tecmo in 2024, with Yosuke Hayashi announced to lead the company. Its first title was Hyrule Warriors: Age of Imprisonment, a collaboration between Koei Tecmo's own Warriors series and Nintendo's The Legend of Zelda series. It released on November 6, 2025, for the Nintendo Switch 2.

=== Gust ===
Gust Co. Ltd. was founded in 1993 and is known for developing RPGs like its long-running Atelier series, and other series including Surge Concerto, Nights of Azure, and BLUE REFLECTION. Koei Tecmo bought Gust Co. Ltd. in 2011 and absorbed it in 2014.

=== Kou Shibusawa ===
On February 18, 2016, as part of the companies reconstruction, Koei Tecmo announced the establishment of Kou Shibusawa, named after the stage name of Koei's founder. It has handled the historically based titles such as Nobunaga's Ambition series, Romance of the Three Kingdoms series, Uncharted Waters series and Nioh series, as well as horse racing simulation Winning Post series. The division also worked with Intelligent Systems and Nintendo on Fire Emblem: Three Houses.

=== Midas ===
Midas is a new division aiming to produce titles for smartphones and to create new IPs. Its only product as of 2025 is Shin Hokuto Musou, a Japan-only installment in the Warriors series based on the Fist of the North Star manga series for Android and iOS as part of the Fist of the North Star: Ken's Rage series.

=== Omega Force ===
Omega Force (ω-Force) is a division of Koei known for developing hack and slash games, monster-hunting action games, among other genres. Omega Force are most well known for its Dynasty Warriors series, including spin-offs such as Samurai Warriors, Warriors Orochi, amongst others. As well as non-Warriors titles such as Dragon Quest Heroes, WinBack, Attack on Titan and Toukiden.

=== Ruby Party ===
Ruby Party specializes in games labeled as Neoromance: otome game visual novels and dating sims, usually with extra side-quests. Out of the three Neoromance series, the best known is Angelique series, which has been in production since 1994. The first game of Angelique series was the first otome game (visual novel and dating sims for women) in the world.

=== Team Ninja ===
Team Ninja (stylised as Team NINJA) is a video game development studio of Tecmo founded in 1995 who develops masocore games, fast-paced action games, fighting games, among other genres. It was formerly led by Tomonobu Itagaki and is best known for the Dead or Alive, Ninja Gaiden, and Nioh series.

== Former subsidiaries ==
=== Team Tachyon ===
Team Tachyon is a Japanese video game development department of Koei Tecmo founded in 2007. Similar to Team Ninja, the group was formed to develop high-profile games, some of which relate to Tecmo Koei's classic franchises. The company says that it chose the name, "Team Tachyon", because a tachyon is a particle that exceeds the speed of light. Key members include Tecmo producers Keisuke Kikuchi (Rygar, Fatal Frame) and Kohei Shibata.

So far, Team Tachyon has aided in the development of the 2008 Fatal Frame IV: Mask of the Lunar Eclipse game for the Wii, 2008 Wii game Rygar: The Battle of Argus, has released Undead Knights for the PlayStation Portable, and Quantum Theory for the PlayStation 3 and the Xbox 360, released in 2010.

As of February 18, 2016, Team Tachyon was absorbed into Team Ninja, with some staff now moved to Gust.

=== Koei Tecmo Canada ===
Founded in 2001 as Koei Canada, Koei Tecmo Canada was the North American development arm of the company based in Toronto. It started out as a CG studio for Koei games but expanded into video game development in 2005, developing Fatal Inertia, Prey the Stars, and Warriors: Legends of Troy. The studio was closed at the end of March 2013.

== Franchises ==
- Atelier
- Dead or Alive
- Dynasty Warriors
- Fatal Frame
- Kessen
- Monster Rancher
- Ninja Gaiden
- Nioh
- Nobunaga's Ambition
- One Piece: Pirate Warriors
- Romance of the Three Kingdoms
- Samurai Warriors
- Toukiden
