= Sweet Ange =

1999 video game

- Developer: Ruby Party
- Publisher: Koei
- Series: Angelique
- Platform: Game Boy Color
- Release: JP: December 17, 1999
- Genre: Simulation
- Modes: Single-player, multiplayer

Sweet Ange is a Game Boy Color game from the Angelique series by KOEI. It is a cooking (confection making) simulation with some dating sim elements. The player is given a choice of four protagonists: Angelique Limoges, Rosalia de Catargena, Angelique Collet, or Rachel Hart. The story takes place several years before the events in the first Angelique game and all the characters are correspondingly younger. The Guardians are known as the Sweet Knights, each of them associated with a confection/drink category. The goal of this game is to win the Rose Contest - the Smallney Academy cooking contest and become friends with the Sweet Knights along the way. As it is in an alternate universe setting, it is generally not considered to be part of a story arc in the series.
