= Turpitude =

Turpitude, meaning baseness or depravity, can refer specifically to:

- Moral turpitude, a legal concept in the United States
- Gnostical turpitude, the crime of the protagonist in Vladimir Nabokov's Invitation to a Beheading
- Turpitude Design, a computer game design firm started by American game designer Stieg Hedlund
