= Balor (disambiguation) =

Balor may refer to:

- Balor, from Irish mythology
- Balor (Dungeons & Dragons), a creature from Dungeons & Dragons
- Finn Bálor, an Irish professional wrestler
- Celtic Tales: Balor of the Evil Eye, a 1995 video game
