= Balor of the Evil Eye =

can refer to:

- Balor, an entity from the Irish mythology
- Celtic Tales: Balor of the Evil Eye, a 1995 video game
