= Yu Miyazaki =

Japanese voice actor

- 宮崎 遊
- Born: 7 October 1991 (age 34)
- Occupation: Voice actor
- Years active: 2016–present
- Employer: Tokyo Actor's Consumer's Cooperative Society
- Notable work: Kiel in 100 Sleeping Princes and the Kingdom of Dreams; Itsuomi Nagi in A Sign of Affection
- Spouse: Atsumi Tanezaki (m. 2023)

Yu Miyazaki (Japanese: 宮崎 遊, Hepburn: Miyazaki Yū; born 7 October 1991) is a Japanese voice actor from Kanagawa Prefecture, affiliated with Tokyo Actor's Consumer's Cooperative Society. He is known for voicing Kiel in 100 Sleeping Princes and the Kingdom of Dreams and Itsuomi Nagi in A Sign of Affection.

== Biography ==
Yu Miyazaki, a native of Kanagawa Prefecture, was born on 7 October 1991. He became interested in narration after being impressed by the narration of a commercial for the Central Japan Railway Company's Sō da: Kyōto, ikō campaign. While looking for jobs as a college student, he recalled his memory of the commercial, which he saw when he was nine years old, and considered a voice acting career. However, he had no acting experience at all, so before entering a training school, he relied on the assistance of a friend of his to do a one-man show, which he wrote himself, in front of about a hundred guests. He graduated as part of the Haikyo Voice Actors Studio's 46th class in 2014, and he joined Tokyo Actor's Consumer's Cooperative Society in 2015.

Miyazaki made his voice acting debut as an English-speaking combatant in the 2016 anime Matoi the Sacred Slayer, later recalling in an interview that he said two English-language words as that character. In June 2018, he was cast as Kiel in 100 Sleeping Princes and the Kingdom of Dreams: The Animation. In March 2020, he was cast as Sachirō Hirugami in Haikyu!!. In July 2020, he was cast as Vergil in Angelique Luminarise. In September 2021, he was cast in The Heike Story. He voiced Tsubaki in "Akakiri", a 2021 episode of Star Wars: Visions. In August 2022, he was cast as Quartz in I'm the Villainess, So I'm Taming the Final Boss. In July 2023, he was cast as Itsuomi Nagi in A Sign of Affection.

Miyazaki substituted for Yūichirō Umehara on the 13 May 2018 episode of the Kōtarō to Yūichirō Hyorotto Danshi radio program.

Among Miyazaki's special skills are video production and video editing.

On 2 October 2023, it was announced that Miyazaki had married voice actress Atsumi Tanezaki.

== Filmography ==
=== Animated television ===
2016

- Matoi the Sacred Slayer, combatant

2017

- Little Witch Academia, Louis Blackwell

2018

- 100 Sleeping Princes and the Kingdom of Dreams: The Animation, Kiel
- Free! - Dive to the Future, Kotarō Terashima
- SSSS.Gridman, Hayakawa
- Tsurune, Daigo Sase

2019

- Mobile Suit Gundam: Hathaway's Flash , Civet Anhern

2020

- Dorohedoro
- Haikyu!!, Sachirō Hirugami

2021

- I'm Standing on a Million Lives, Lolle
- Star Wars: Visions, Tsubaki

2022

- Aoashi, Seikyō player
- I'm the Villainess, So I'm Taming the Final Boss, Quartz
- More Than a Married Couple, But Not Lovers
- The Heike Story, Taira no Shigehira
- The Prince of Tennis II: U-17 World Cup, Milky Milman

2023

- Heavenly Delusion, boar #9
- Revenger
- Zom 100: Bucket List of the Dead, Tatsuya

2024

- A Sign of Affection, Itsuomi Nagi

2025

- City the Animation, Kamaboko Oni

=== Original net animation ===
2021

- The Heike Story

2022

- Kakegurui, Ren Kochi

=== Internet drama ===
2025

- Glass Heart, Akane

=== Video games ===
?

- Heaven Inferno, Creed

2019

- 100 Sleeping Princes and the Kingdom of Dreams, Kiel

2020

- Life Is Strange: Before the Storm, Jacob
- Realive: Teito Kagura Dance Corps, Jin Shinonome

2021

- Angelique Luminarise, Vergil

2022

- Your Majesty, Stavka
- Genjū Keiyaku Cryptract, Casiel

=== Dubbing ===
==== Live-action ====
- Nam Joo-hyuk
  - Start-Up, Nam Do-san
  - Twenty-Five Twenty-One, Baek Yi-jin
- 100 Days My Prince, Lee Yul / Na Won-deuk (Doh Kyung-soo)
- Eddington, Michael Cooke (Micheal Ward)
- In Time (2025 BS10 Star Channel edition), Kolber (Brendan Miller)

==== Animation ====
- Arcane, Jayce
- Inside Job, Ron Staedtler
