= 100 Sleeping Princes and the Kingdom of Dreams =

Japanese smartphone game

- Cover art for the television series

夢王国と眠れる100人の王子様 (Yume Ōkoku to Nemureru 100-Nin no Ōji-sama)
- Video game
- Developer: GCrest
- Publisher: JP: GCrest; CHN: Bilibili
- Music by: Masafumi Takada
- Genre: Puzzle, role-playing, otome
- Platform: Android, iOS
- Released: JP: March 2015; CHN: September 2015; TW: September 2015; KOR: September 2016
- Novel
- Written by: Touri Kozuka
- Published by: Kadokawa
- Published: April 9, 2016
- Novel

夢王国と眠れる100人の王子様 〜The memory of Prince〜
- Published by: Enterbrain
- Published: July 15, 2016
- Manga
- Written by: Hana Ichika; Kazuhumi Sanada; Seira Yūgen
- Published by: Enterbrain
- Published: February 15, 2017
- Original net animation

Yume Oukoku to Nemureru 100-nin no Oujisama: Short Stories
- Directed by: Shin Katagai
- Written by: Sayaka Abe; Shin Katagai
- Studio: Satelight
- Released: March 25, 2017 – December 23, 2017
- Runtime: 9 minutes
- Episodes: 10
- Anime television series
- Directed by: Yukina Hiiro
- Produced by: Fumihiro Ozawa; Shōta Watase; Manabu Katō; Nobuyasu Nobe; Moe Mitani (Note: Unconfirmed romanization of 三谷萌.); Ai Sudō (Note: Unconfirmed romanization of 須藤愛.)
- Written by: Natsuko Takahashi
- Music by: Masafumi Takada
- Studio: Project No.9
- Licensed by: NA: Sentai Filmworks; SEA: Medialink
- Original network: AT-X, Tokyo MX, Sun TV, BS11
- Original run: July 5, 2018 – September 20, 2018
- Episodes: 12
- Manga

夢王国と眠れる100人の王子様 a little record
- Written by: Maika Narumi
- Published by: Hakusensha
- Magazine: Manga Park
- Published: August 3, 2018

100 Sleeping Princes and the Kingdom of Dreams (Note: Japanese: 夢王国と眠れる100人の王子様, Hepburn: Yume Ōkoku to Nemureru 100-Nin no Ōji-sama) is a Japanese puzzle and role-playing smartphone game published by GCrest. It was released on Android and iOS devices in 2015. An original net animation by Satelight was released in 2017. An anime television series adaptation by Project No.9 premiered from July 5 to September 20, 2018. Sentai Filmworks have licensed the anime and are streaming it on Hidive.

== Plot summary ==
A normal girl is transported to another world, known as the Dream World. Here, dreams are the energy of all beings living within it. The protagonist is revealed to be the long-lost Princess of Traumere and therefore the princess of the Dream World, and she must defend the world from creatures known as Dream Eaters, who steal people's dreams. Using a special ring, she must rescue the various princes of the world, trapped in eternal slumber within their own rings, and team up with them to save the Dream World.

== Gameplay ==
The game is a time-based match-3 strategy puzzle game. Players assemble a team of 5 princes and combat Dream Eaters in quests of varying difficulty. Princes are divided into 5 attribute categories: Sexy, Passion, Cute, Gentle, and Cool. The pieces on the game board reflect these attributes and erasing 3 or more pieces of the same color adds to the attack of princes on the player's team of the matching color. Players have a limited amount of time each turn to erase as many pieces as they can. Princes also have special skills that can be used during combat that can improve a player's chance of clearing the challenge. Weekly events and gacha allow players many opportunities to recruit more princes for their teams, and each event releases new variations of the princes.

Part of gameplay also involves a role-play element. Players will have the opportunity to name the protagonist at the beginning of the game, and this is the name that will appear throughout the game when referring to the player in their role as Princess of Traumere. Each prince has their own story interacting with the protagonist that can be read in its entirety when a prince is completely leveled up and 'awakened'. As players read through a prince's story, they will be given a dialogue choice at various points. Certain answers will award Sun Drops and others will award Moon Drops. Whichever there are more of at the end of the story will determine which route the prince can awaken to: Sun or Moon. At this point, the story will split and the conclusion for the Sun Route will be different from the Moon Route. This awakening will also affect a prince's stats and skills.

== Anime characters ==
- The Heroine (Voiced by: Haruka Kimura)
- Avi (Voiced by: Kenichi Suzumura)
- Navi (Voiced by: Daiki Yamashita)
- Gary (Voiced by: Satoshi Hino)
- Gilbert (Voiced by: Shinnosuke Tachibana)
- Douglas (Voiced by: Junichi Suwabe)
- Rosso (Voiced by: Masakazu Morita)
- Orion (Voiced by: Takahiro Sakurai)
- Kiel (Voiced by: Yu Miyazaki)
- Setique (Voiced by: Hidenori Takahashi)
- Kegaremaru (Voiced by: Seiichiro Yamashita)
- Frost (Voiced by: Tarusuke Shingaki)
- Graysia (Voiced by: Yoshimasa Hosoya)
- Schnee (Voiced by: Hiro Shimono)
