= Koei =

Japanese video game company

Koei Co., Ltd.
- Native name: 株式会社コーエー
- Romanized name: Kabushikigaisha Kōē
- Type: Kabushiki gaisha Subsidiary
- Industry: Video games
- Founded: July 25, 1978; 48 years ago
- Founder: Yōichi Erikawa; Keiko Erikawa
- Defunct: April 1, 2010; 16 years ago
- Fate: Merged with Tecmo
- Successor: Koei Tecmo Games
- Headquarters: Minowacho, Kōhoku-ku, Yokohama, Kanagawa Prefecture, Japan
- Products: List of Koei Tecmo games
- Parent: Koei Tecmo (2009–2010)
- Website: www.koei.co.jp/koei_home.html

Koei Co., Ltd. was a Japanese video game developer and publisher founded in 1978. The company is known for its historical simulation games based on the novel Romance of the Three Kingdoms, as well as simulation games based on pseudo-historical events.

Koei found mainstream success in its series of loosely historical action games such as Dynasty Warriors and Samurai Warriors, also known as the Musō series. It also owned a division known as Ruby Party, which focuses on otome games.

On April 1, 2009, Koei merged with Tecmo to create the Tecmo Koei Holdings holding company. After operating as subsidiaries of Tecmo Koei Holdings for exactly a year, Koei and Tecmo were combined as a single company on April 1, 2010 to form Tecmo Koei Games (with Koei as the actual surviving corporation).

== History ==
Koei was established in July 1978 by Yōichi Erikawa (also known as Kou Shibusawa) and Keiko Erikawa. Yoichi was a student at Keio University, who decided to pursue his interest in programming after his family's rural dyestuffs business failed. The company has since remained located in the Hiyoshi area of Yokohama.

Koei initially focused on personal computer sales and made-to-order business software. In 1982, the company released the erotic title (eroge) Seduction of the Condominium Wife (団地妻の誘惑, Danchi Tsuma no Yūwaku), which was an early role-playing adventure game with color graphics, owing to the eight-color palette of the PC-8001 computer. It became a hit, helping Koei become a major software company. In March of the same year, Koei released Underground Exploration, the earliest known Japanese RPG. In 1983, it released Nobunaga's Ambition (信長の野望, Nobunaga no Yabō), a historical strategy game set during the Sengoku period of Japanese history. The game went on to receive numerous awards. The company continued producing more games set against the backdrop of world history, including Romance of the Three Kingdoms, set during the Three Kingdoms period of Chinese history, and Uncharted Waters (大航海時代, Dai Kōkai Jidai; lit. Great Navigation Era), set in Portugal during the Age of Exploration.

In 1988, Koei established a North American subsidiary, Koei America Corporation, in California. This subsidiary localized Koei games for export to all territories outside Japan, and even produced original games and concepts with the leadership of designer Stieg Hedlund. These games included Liberty or Death, Celtic Tales: Balor of the Evil Eye, Gemfire, and Saiyuki: Journey West. After Hedlund's departure, this subsidiary ceased game development in 1995, focusing instead on localization, sales, and marketing.

Though none of Koei's historical simulations achieved mass market success, they acquired a loyal cult following that allowed them to remain profitable. They could reliably predict how many copies of their games would sell. This was especially important during the cartridge era; a surplus of unsold cartridges of a single game was often enough to bankrupt a company.

A Canadian subsidiary, Koei Canada, Inc., was established in early 2001, and a European subsidiary, Koei Limited, was established in early 2003 in Hertfordshire, United Kingdom. Koei also maintained subsidiaries in mainland China, Korea, Taiwan, and Lithuania. Koei later established a Singapore branch for game development, such as Sangokushi Online.

Koei's Ruby Party division specializes in games labeled as 'Neoromance', which are GxB dating sims usually with extra side-quests. Out of the three Neoromance series, the best known is Angelique, which had been in production since 1994. Harukanaru Toki no Naka de is a newer Neoromance hit, with many sequels and an anime television series. The newest game in the series, Kin'iro no Corda, gained popularity partially because the manga series it was based on had recently been licensed by Viz for English language publishing. An anime television series based on it began airing in October 2006. A sequel was also released on the PlayStation 2 in March 2007.

On September 4, 2008, Koei announced that it was in talks to purchase ailing competitor Tecmo. They agreed in November 2008 to merge on April 1, 2009, to form Tecmo Koei Holdings. On January 26, 2009, the two companies approved the merger. The holding company formed on April 1, 2009, as planned.

Koei changed its name to Tecmo Koei Games on April 1, 2010, by absorbing Tecmo. Koei's subsidiaries in the United States, Europe, and Korea already had their names changed months before their Japanese parent company. The developing operations of the original Koei and Tecmo companies were spun off on March 15, 2010, as new separate subsidiaries under the names of Koei Co. Ltd and Tecmo Co. Ltd, respectively. They were both absorbed the following year by Tecmo Koei Games, on April 1, 2011. On July 1, 2014, Tecmo Koei Games was renamed Koei Tecmo Games.

== See also ==
- List of Koei games
