= Helck (manga) =

Japanese manga series

- First tankōbon volume cover
- Genre: Adventure; Fantasy
- Manga
- Written by: Nanaki Nanao
- Published by: Shogakukan
- English publisher: NA: Viz Media; SEA: Shogakukan Asia
- Imprint: Ura Sunday Comics
- Magazine: Ura Sunday; MangaONE
- Original run: May 5, 2014 – December 18, 2017
- Volumes: 12
- Manga

Piwi: Fushigi na Ikimono
- Written by: Nanaki Nanao
- Published by: Shogakukan
- Imprint: Ura Sunday Comics
- Magazine: MangaONE
- Original run: July 16, 2018 – October 8, 2018
- Volumes: 1
- Manga

Völundio: Divergent Sword Saga
- Written by: Nanaki Nanao
- Published by: Shogakukan
- English publisher: NA: Comikey
- Imprint: Ura Sunday Comics
- Magazine: Ura Sunday; MangaONE
- Original run: August 24, 2020 – present
- Volumes: 10
- Anime television series
- Directed by: Tatsuo Sato
- Written by: Toshizo Nemoto; Mitsutaka Hirota
- Music by: Yoshihisa Hirano
- Studio: Satelight
- Licensed by: Sentai Filmworks
- Original network: Nippon TV (AnichU), BS NTV, AT-X
- Original run: July 12, 2023 – December 20, 2023
- Episodes: 24
- icon

Helck is a Japanese web manga series written and illustrated by Nanaki Nanao. It was serialized in Shogakukan's Ura Sunday website and MangaONE app from May 2014 to December 2017, with its chapters collected in 12 tankōbon volumes. Shogakukan published 12 new edition volumes that feature color pages from the original series run and new covers from April 2022 to July 2023. The manga has been licensed for English release in North America by Viz Media and by Shogakukan Asia in Southeast Asia. An anime television series adaptation produced by Satelight aired from July to December 2023.

== Plot ==
It has been three months since the Demon Lord was defeated by a lone human hero. While the humans celebrated their victory, the demon realm quickly organized a tournament to choose their next Lord. One peculiar contestant quickly rising up through the tournament is a human hero named Helck, who claims to hate his own kind. Vermilio the Red, one of the Four Elite Lords overseeing the tournament, immediately suspects Helck of being a saboteur and tries to rig the following matches into games of skill, but Helck continues to win. Vermilio soon finds out that Helck is a wanted criminal in the human realm, suspected of killing his brother, who happens to be the legendary hero Cless, the one who killed the Demon Lord. Vermilio still wants to know Helck's true motivation for entering the tournament, what happened in the human realm over the past three months, and what are these mysterious winged soldiers now threatening the demon realm in place of the humans.

== Characters ==
Helck (ヘルク, Heruku)
Voiced by: Katsuyuki Konishi (Japanese); Andrew Love, Luci Christian (young) (English)
Vermilio (ヴァミリオ, Vamirio)
Voiced by: Mikako Komatsu (Japanese); Kira Vincent-Davis (English)
Azudra (アズドラ, Azudora)
Voiced by: Yoshitsugu Matsuoka (Japanese); Joe Daniels (English)
Hon (ホン)
Voiced by: Akira Ishida (Japanese); John Swasey (English)
Asta (アスタ, Asuta)
Voiced by: Shiki Aoki (Japanese); Kara Greenberg (English)
Ista (イスタ, Isuta)
Voiced by: Haruka Shiraishi (Japanese); Annie Wild (English)
Kenros (ケンロス, Kenrosu)
Voiced by: Hiroyuki Yoshino (Japanese); Jack Stansbury (English)
Hyura (ヒュラ)
Voiced by: Rena Maeda (Japanese); Brianna Roberts (English)
Dorshe (ドルーシ, Dorūshi)
Voiced by: Takuya Nakashima (Japanese); Michael Wronski (English)
Rococo (ロココ, Rokoko)
Voiced by: Sora Tokui (Japanese); Karlii Hoch (English)
Piwi (ピウイ, Piui)
Voiced by: Shiori Izawa (Japanese); Jessica Boone (English)
Cless (クレス, Kuresu)
Voiced by: Motoharu Ono (Japanese); Houston Hayes (English)
Alicia (アリシア, Arishia)
Voiced by: Reina Kondō (Japanese); Melissa Engler (English)
Rafaed (ラファエド, Rafaedo)
Voiced by: Atsushi Miyauchi (Japanese); John Gremillion (English)
Mikaros (ミカロス, Mikarosu)
Voiced by: Daisuke Hirakawa (Japanese); Brandon Hearnsberger (English)
Shalamy (シャルアミ, Sharuami)
Voiced by: Yumiri Hanamori (Japanese); Cat Thomas (English)
Edil (エディル, Ediru)
Voiced by: Hiroki Nanami (Japanese); Adam Gibbs (English)
Zelgeon (ゼルジオン, Zerujion)
Voiced by: Shuta Morishima (Japanese); Ty Mahany (English)
Haraoul (ハラオル)
Voiced by: Satoshi Niwa (Japanese); Greg Cote (English)
Elise (イーリス, Īrisu)
Voiced by: Aimi (Japanese); Kelley Peters (English)
Witch (魔女, Majo)
Voiced by: Yukana (Japanese); Shelley Calene-Black (English)
Narrator (ナレーション, Narēshon)
Voiced by: Shūichi Ikeda (Japanese); Jay Hickman (English)

== Media ==
=== Manga ===
Written and illustrated by Nanaki Nanao, Helck was serialized on Shogakukan's Ura Sunday website and MangaONE app from May 5, 2014, to December 18, 2017. Shogakukan collected its chapters in 12 tankōbon volumes, published from August 2014 to May 2018. From April 2022 to July 2023, Shogakukan published a 12-volume edition that features color pages from the original series run and new covers.

In June 2022, Viz Media announced that they licensed the new edition of the series for English publication since January 2023. In July 2023, Shogakukan Asia announced that they also licensed the series for publication in Southeast Asia.

A spin-off manga titled Piwi: Fushigi na Ikimono was serialized in MangaONE from July 16 to October 8, 2018. It has been collected into a single tankōbon volume, published on November 12 of the same year.

A related manga titled Völundio: Divergent Sword Saga began serialization in MangaONE on August 24, 2020. It has been collected in ten tankōbon volumes as of November 2026. The series is licensed digitally in English by Comikey.

==== Volumes ====
No.	Japanese release date	Japanese ISBN
1	August 18, 2014	978-4-09-125236-4
2	December 12, 2014	978-4-09-125547-1
3	May 12, 2015	978-4-09-126138-0
4	August 12, 2015	978-4-09-126330-8
5	November 12, 2015	978-4-09-126630-9
6	March 11, 2016	978-4-09-127024-5
7	July 19, 2016	978-4-09-127359-8
8	November 18, 2016	978-4-09-127440-3
9	April 12, 2017	978-4-09-127587-5
10	July 19, 2017	978-4-09-127658-2
11	November 15, 2017	978-4-09-128025-1
12	May 11, 2018	978-4-09-128294-1

===== New edition =====
No.	Original release date	Original ISBN	English release date	English ISBN
1	April 12, 2022	978-4-09-851077-1	January 10, 2023	978-1-9747-3672-0
2	May 12, 2022	978-4-09-851103-7	March 14, 2023	978-1-9747-3673-7
3	June 10, 2022	978-4-09-851162-4	May 9, 2023	978-1-9747-3701-7
4	July 12, 2022	978-4-09-851196-9	July 11, 2023	978-1-9747-3746-8
5	August 10, 2022	978-4-09-851236-2	September 12, 2023	978-1-9747-4040-6
6	September 12, 2022	978-4-09-851282-9	November 14, 2023	978-1-9747-4080-2
7	October 12, 2022	978-4-09-851337-6	January 9, 2024	978-1-9747-4286-8
8	February 17, 2023	978-4-09-851634-6	March 12, 2024	978-1-9747-4319-3
9	April 18, 2023	978-4-09-852009-1	May 14, 2024	978-1-9747-4559-3
10	May 12, 2023	978-4-09-852063-3	July 9, 2024	978-1-9747-4607-1
11	June 12, 2023	978-4-09-852137-1	September 10, 2024	978-1-9747-4878-5
12	July 12, 2023	978-4-09-852546-1	November 12, 2024	978-1-9747-4923-2

==== Piwi: Fushigi na Ikimono ====
No.	Japanese release date	Japanese ISBN
1	November 12, 2018	978-4-09-128720-5

==== Völundio: Divergent Sword Saga ====
No.	Japanese release date	Japanese ISBN
1	February 12, 2021	978-4-09-850456-5
2	June 17, 2021	978-4-09-850597-5
3	February 17, 2022	978-4-09-850891-4
4	February 17, 2023	978-4-09-851633-9
5	July 12, 2023	978-4-09-852547-8
6	October 12, 2023	978-4-09-852866-0
7	February 9, 2024	978-4-09-853122-6
8	March 12, 2025	978-4-09-854034-1
9	January 19, 2026	978-4-09-854401-1
10	November 18, 2026	978-4-09-854891-0

=== Anime ===
An anime adaptation was announced by Nanaki Nanao on February 14, 2022, which was later revealed to be a television series. It is produced by Satelight and directed by Tatsuo Sato, with scripts written by Toshizo Nemoto and Mitsutaka Hirota, character designs handled by Yoshinori Deno, and music composed by Yoshihisa Hirano. The series aired for two continuous cours from July 12 to December 20, 2023, on Nippon TV's AnichU programming block and other networks. (Note: Nippon TV listed the series premiere on July 11 at 25:29, which is effectively July 12 at 1:29 a.m. JST.) For the first cour, the opening theme is "It's My Soul" by Hiroki Nanami, while the ending theme is "Statice" (スターチス) by Saji. For the second cour, the opening theme is "Help" by Aimi, while the ending theme is "Hikari" (ヒカリ) by Kanoerana. Sentai Filmworks licensed the series and is streaming it on Hidive.

==== Episodes ====
No.	Title (Note: All English titles are taken from Hidive.)	Directed by (Note: Information is taken from the ending credits of each episode.)	Written by	Storyboarded by	Original release date
1	"Helck the Hero"; Transliteration: "Yūsha Heruku" (Japanese: 勇者ヘルク)	Naomichi Yamato	Toshizo Nemoto	Kagetsu Aizawa	July 12, 2023
After the death of a local demon king, the Empire begins a tournament to select a new demon king for the region. Participants typically include demons of all talents; however, this time around, a human hero named Helck appears. While the demon audience is not bothered by a human participating, Vermilio, one of the 4 Heavenly Kings, specifically is wary that such a powerful human is attempting to win the competition.
2	"Anne from Management"; Transliteration: "Un'ei Sutaffu no An" (Japanese: 運営スタッフのアン)	Takaaki Ishiyama	Toshizo Nemoto	Hiroshi Hara	July 19, 2023
Vermilio goes undercover as "Anne" and intentionally has the tournament management try to sabotage Helck at every round of the competition. However Helck overcomes every challenge with ease, be it a cooking challenge where Vermilio herself was judging or a horse race where Helck was not provided an effective mount. Hyura becomes suspicious of Anne's identity and Kenros is further befriended by Helck throughout the competition. The competition ends early without a victor as a nearby castle is under attack; it is determined that the winner of the final round will be the person who defeats the human attackers.
3	"The Unknown Enemy"; Transliteration: "Michi no Teki" (Japanese: 未知の敵)	Masayuki Iimura	Toshizo Nemoto	Kagetsu Aizawa	July 26, 2023
Asta, a demon spy, is investigating the human kingdom. She is enjoying the lush vegetation and pretty landscapes; however, she finds the kingdom to be barren of humans. Helck, Hyura, Kenros, Dorshe and Vermilio, who is undercover as "Anne", are on their way to the castle when they run into a number of strong monsters. Helck and Vermilio easily dispatch the monsters and the group has a meal together. They eventually arrive at the castle and come across the winged soldiers besieging the building, and Hyura suddenly has her arm sliced off by one of them.
4	"Shock"; Transliteration: "Shōgeki" (Japanese: 衝撃)	Makoto Sokuza	Toshizo Nemoto	Manabu Yukawa	August 2, 2023
Hyura is down and Helck helps protect her by calling out the winged soldier's name "Edil". Helck and Edil have a conversation and the fight continues afterward. Vermilio has no issues with the winged soldiers and Hyura recovers her arm through regeneration. Although the winged soldiers are mostly defeated, they manage to open a gate near the barrier stone of the castle and in the process of opening the gate they send Helck and Vermilio to a remote island.
5	"The Remote Island Village"; Transliteration: "Kotō no Mura" (Japanese: 孤島の村)	Yasuyuki Fuse	Toshizo Nemoto	Hiroshi Hara	August 9, 2023
Hon reports to Azudra that Vermilio has gone missing, leaving him in shock. On the island, Vermilio is trying to determine how far she is from the Empire, but she has trouble determining the distance. She comes across a small green bird named "Piwi" and Helck, who appears to have prepared food and shelter. Back in the Empire, Azudra orders a search party to look for Vermilio and Helck. He uses a spell that pinpoints people's locations on a map; however, it appears to him that Vermilio and Helck are outside of the range of mapped territory. Back on the island, Helck and Vermilio learn there are other inhabitants on the island and they are set to meet the chief.
6	"Invasion"; Transliteration: "Shūrai" (Japanese: 襲来)	Masayuki Iimura	Toshizo Nemoto	Kenji Setō	August 16, 2023
Vermilio and Helck head to the village chief. Vermilio is apprehensive, as he seems threatening at first; however, it turns out that he and the rest of the village are peaceful and friendly. After a feast together, Vermilio learns of a great witch who may be able to tell them how to get back home; however, she is behind a barrier and they will have to wait for her to come down from the mountain. Helck and Vermilio have a conversation regarding their goals and Helck confirms that he is willing to fight humanity. Back in the Empire, a large number of winged human soldiers are attacking; however, Azudra defeats them easily with his giant root attacks.
7	"The Human King"; Transliteration: "Ningen no Ō" (Japanese: 人間の王)	Satoshi Ōsedo	Mitsutaka Hirota	Dashiyo Hatsumi	August 23, 2023
After Azudra easily captures the winged soldiers, Hon explains that Azudra's ability is to control the roots of all trees in the Empire. A large number of winged soldiers begin firing arrows from a distance; however, instead of focusing on the demons, they are killing their own soldiers, to the shock of Azudra and the other demons. Hyura mentions that this also occurred the last time they engaged the winged soldiers. Azudra questions one of the winged soldiers who gloats that they will not die but simply be resurrected to fight again. Back in the human empire, the winged soldiers who were killed respawn in the castle in front of the human king and brief him on their progress. After this discussion, Azudra, back in the Empire, explains to his team that while the winged soldiers are relatively weak, they actually pose an incredible threat to the empire if they continuously resurrect and continuously get stronger through combat; eventually, they will become the greatest threat the Empire faces. Azudra makes the decision to reinforce castles that the winged soldiers are likely to attack and to personally help in the defense. He also sends a number of items to Vermilio's location through a gate; however, these items are eaten by Piwi and never reach her.
8	"Back to the Continent"; Transliteration: "Tairiku e" (Japanese: 大陸へ)	Tōru Hamasaki	Mitsutaka Hirota	Tatsuo Sato	August 30, 2023
The great witch visits the village, but Vermilio misses her; however, the witch is told of their situation, understands their needs, and gives them permission to climb the mountain to reach her. When they reach the witch, she appears strikingly similar to Vermilio. She tells them to head northwest to get back to the continent and what steps they should take to navigate the ocean. She also warns Vermilio that Helck is incredibly dangerous. After a short while Helck and Vermilio have retrieved an animal that will help them with navigating the ocean and they have put together a small boat. They get on the boat and Piwi decides to accompany them despite the dangers of their journey. While they are heading off, they run into a thick fog, and a massive octopus-like creature appears.
9	"Barbarians of the Tothman Tribe"; Transliteration: "Banzoku Tōsuman" (Japanese: 蛮族トースマン)	Yasuyuki Fuse	Mitsutaka Hirota	Noriaki Saitō	September 6, 2023
Helck attempts to fight the octopus; however, it is quite durable against physical attacks. Eventually, Vermilio gets the boat free from the whirlpool, but they lose Helck, who gets pulled under the water. Vermilio eventually reaches the continent, upset at what happened to Helck, but when she walks onto shore, Helck is standing there with a goal sign, shocking her. She asks Helck to explain what happened and he tells her that he got free of the Octopus and simply swam to the shore. While heading deeper into a nearby forest, they are apprehended by barbarians who work for the Erille kingdom. The princess of the kingdom condemns the barbarians and tells them to free the three they apprehended. They explain that due to the actions of another faction, their own kingdom is facing ruin. The Tothmans, the other faction, appear and threaten to kill all the remaining members of the kingdom of Erille. Helck and Vermilio defend the kingdom and easily defeat the Tothman soldiers. The king of the Tothman then engages the two in combat but is also easily defeated. Enraged at his loss, he suddenly transforms into a much more powerful being.
10	"In Pursuit of a Map"; Transliteration: "Chizu o Motomete" (Japanese: 地図を求めて)	Masayuki Iimura	Toshizo Nemoto	Manabu Yukawa	September 13, 2023
While the transformed Tothman king is significantly stronger than before, Helck and Vermilio still defeat him with relative ease. Upon his defeat, all the people of Erille transform back to their regular appearances, freeing them from the state the Tothman imposed on them. After celebrating their victory, the two head off to a nearby town. In the new town, they find a map that could help them get back home; however, the seller charges an extortionate price for the map, forcing Vermilio and Helck to get creative to find the cash for it. Helck gets involved in a cooking contest, defeating the contest favorite in a very close match and winning the grand prize. After purchasing the map, they decide to move on towards the demon continent; however, a local musician warns them that the path they are taking will lead to a run-in with a warrior of darkness that could potentially kill them.
11	"The Troubadour's Song"; Transliteration: "Ginyūshijin no Uta" (Japanese: 吟遊詩人の唄)	Ken Morita	Toshizo Nemoto	Noriaki Saitō	September 20, 2023
While they have successfully obtained a map, the musician lets them know of the dark warrior in the region they will have to traverse in order to get back home. Helck and Vermilio move on towards the path on the map despite the dangers and run into a warrior of darkness. They engage the warrior in battle, and for the first time, Helck is severely injured and Vermilio is backed into a corner. Helck eventually becomes enraged and unleashes his full power, terrifying Vermilio, who manages to get him under control. Once the warrior is defeated, they move towards what appear to be abandoned ruins and the warrior explains his history. He tells the two his real name, Augis, and explains how the kingdom he fought for summoned dark warriors in order to fight a great threat and how the dark warriors could not be controlled and brought the kingdom to ruin. The musician the pair had talked to earlier, Iris, shows up and explains that Augis is her older brother. She thanks them for defeating him and sings him a final song, after which Augis gives his weapon to Helck and moves on.
12	"The Spirit of Faith"; Transliteration: "Shinjiru Kokoro" (Japanese: 信じる心)	Tsuyoshi Yoshimoto	Toshizo Nemoto	Hiroshi Hara	September 27, 2023
Azudra and his forces manage to defend Urum castle from the human army and capture some human soldiers without killing them. Asta observes the defeated humans back in their capital and notices that they are getting stronger and better at observation; given this, she has to be even more careful than she was before. Helck and Vermilio set up camp. Helck shows her a broken blade called the "hero killer" which he states that she should use to kill him if he loses control like before. Vermilio refuses to take the blade; however, Helck says he will explain his story and history, after which she can decide her answer.
13	"With Younger Brother in Tow"; Transliteration: "Otōto to Tomo ni" (Japanese: 弟と共に)	Yasuyuki Fuse	Mitsutaka Hirota	Tatsuo Sato	October 4, 2023
Helck begins recounting his past to Vermilio. In a flashback, Helck is shown with his younger brother Cless, protecting him from abusive noble children. He explains that they lost their parents to monsters and had moved to the city to find work, except there were no jobs for two children that paid a living wage. Due to his hero powers, Helck could endure abuse from nobility, as he recovered from all injuries shortly after they were inflicted; his goal was to make sure Cless at least had a tolerable childhood. One day, Cless gets very ill and nobody is willing to help. Helck falls into despair and is about to lose hope when a young blonde noble girl listens to Helck and takes Cless to her father, who brings in a renowned doctor to treat him. Cless recovers, and 15 years later he works as a captain in the military, while Helck works as a construction worker.
14	"The Mercenaries"; Transliteration: "Yōheidan" (Japanese: 傭兵団)	Tōru Hamasaki	Mitsutaka Hirota	Akari Ranzaki	October 11, 2023
Helck continues his flashback and explains that due to the increased monster threat, he also joins the military alongside Cless; they run into new world creatures but manage to defeat them. Helck explains how he met Edil and Alicia which led to them partnering up in a mercenary group. Despite the very determined defense of the kingdom, the sheer volume of monsters continued to threaten its existence; eventually, they decided to send a party to the demon king's castle to defeat him. In the present, Vermilio notes that this analysis was incorrect, as the demon king and his castle were actually delaying the monsters from leaving the demon continent. Cless and his party manage to defeat the demon king, but Cless comes back in a horribly injured state and is bedridden. Defeating the demon king, as Vermilio noted, led to more monsters attacking the kingdom, and this time Helck went to the demon king's castle under the assumption the demon king had come back to life.
15	"The Power of Heroes"; Transliteration: "Yūsha no Chikara" (Japanese: 勇者の力)	Ken Morita	Mitsutaka Hirota	Satoshi Ōsedo	October 18, 2023
Helck invades the demon king's castle, where he runs into Azudra and begins battling him. He asks Azudra why the demons continue to send monsters towards the human kingdom. Azudra tells Helck that this is not the case and that the demon army actually is stemming the flow of monsters passing through the continent. Azudra explains that the flow of monsters should be stemmed in the future once a new demon king takes over the castle and even gives him a notice about the new demon king contest, which Helck eventually participated in. Helck goes back to the kingdom but he does not tell anyone what he learned, because he knows the human side will not accept it. He witnesses humans torturing three captured demons in a public square and intervenes, calling it barbaric. The three demons somehow transform into greater monsters, but the winged soldiers appear and easily defeat them. The noble who saved Cless's life in the past appears and tells Helck that demons cannot be trusted and tells him that the greater demon empire needs to be destroyed. He explains that they will awaken more humans to the power of the winged soldiers to do this. Helck is unsure whom to trust, Azudra or the noble; however, another man approaches Helck, tells him that he fought alongside Cless, and asks Helck to help him.
16	"The Truth Behind Awakening"; Transliteration: "Kakusei no Shinjitsu" (Japanese: 覚醒の真実)	Makoto Sokuza	Mitsutaka Hirota	Noriaki Saitō	October 25, 2023
The man who accompanied Cless was named Zelgeon, an infantry commander. He explains to Helck that the awakening process is not what it seems and is very dangerous. He also explains that all who have gone through the process have lost their sense of self and free will. He states that the kingdom plans on casting the spell on everyone that is not nobility and enslaving the entire kingdom into a forced army. He tells Helck the spell caster Mikaros and the hero Cless both need to be defeated to prevent this plan, and explains to Helck that Cless is not aware of the plan and what it entails. Helck also tells his mercenary allies what Azudra told him; while they are not fully convinced, Alicia agrees to keep an open mind. The group infiltrate the castle and approach the nobles to ask them to give up the plan. The nobles refuse, and the mercenary group try to attack them, but the human king orders them all to kneel, and they all kneel immediately. Helck however is unaffected and breaks the grip the human king has over his allies. The king brings out Cless and orders him to attack everyone. Alicia manages to break Cless out of his controlled state using the hero killer sword; however, Mikaros manages to steal the sword from her.
17	"Traitors"; Transliteration: "Hangyakusha" (Japanese: 反逆者)	Masayuki Iimura	Mitsutaka Hirota	Masayuki Iimura	November 1, 2023
Mikaros, now wielding the Hero Killer sword, asks Helck to work with him, but Helck refuses. Mikaros attempts to kill Helck with the sword, but Cless intervenes and cuts off Mikaros's arms. Cless has temporarily broken out of the king's control, but the king regains his hold over Cless and tells him to kill Helck. Cless approaches Helck but defies the king's controlling ability and instead wounds himself lethally and says goodbye to Helck. After witnessing this, Helck becomes incredibly enraged, and the power unleashed from him threatens to destroy the whole kingdom. His allies manage to calm him down but he passes out. Later, he wakes up in a cave wondering where all his allies are. He learns from bounty hunters that he is wanted for betraying the kingdom with a huge price on his head. Helck realizes there is a chance his allies are still alive and so he rushes towards the kingdom with the intent of saving them.
18	"Smile"; Transliteration: "Egao" (Japanese: 笑顔)	Sō Toyama	Mitsutaka Hirota	Tatsuo Sato	November 8, 2023}
Helck defeats the bounty hunters and arrives to save Alicia. He is angered by the poor treatment of Alicia despite all she did for the kingdom. He asks her to come to the demon empire, but he learns the awakening has already started and is spreading through falling snow; Alicia and the regular civilians are all transforming. Alicia asks Helck to kill her so she does not transform into a monster; however, Helck is unable to bring himself to finish her off. They have a final talk where Alicia asks Helck to smile for her and so he smiles despite everything and walks away.
19	"Vermilio of the Four Elite Lords"; Transliteration: "Teikoku Shitennō Vamirio" (Japanese: 帝国四天王ヴァミリオ)	Yasuyuki Fuse	Toshizo Nemoto	Dashiyo Hatsumi	November 15, 2023
Helck comes across a large number of awakened humans, most have not retained their original personality, but among those who have, they have embraced their new awakened powers. In the present Vermilio asks why Helck did not kill the human king, but Helck says that will not solve the issue, as without the word of the king, the awakened humans would just turn into monsters that would rampage out of control. Helck runs into Mikaros and tries to defeat him after Mikaros explains he is still using Cless to drive the awakening, however Mikaros uses a portal to send Helck far away to the Demon Empire. Back in the present, Helck explains to Vermilio that due to his dormant power and rage, he wants Vermilio to hold onto the Hero Killer blade in case he loses control. Vermilio reveals that she was not telling him the full truth all this time and that she is one of the four heavenly kings of the Demon Empire. After talking about their goals and Vermilio telling Helck to fight with the goal of surviving the battle, they head to a railway and catch a ride on a train. In the new town they reach, the leader tells them about a dangerous monster, but Vermilio and Helck have already defeated it. While nearing the empire, they run into one of Azudra's scouts who hands them a letter telling them to head to the Human Kingdom instead of the Empire.
20	"The Mysterious Woman"; Transliteration: "Nazo no Josei" (Japanese: 謎の女性)	Ryōji Tanaka	Toshizo Nemoto	Noriaki Saitō	November 22, 2023
Azudra and the other demons are fighting off human forces while discussing whether the search party for Vermilio and Helck is adequate. Asta continues spying on the people in the castle and almost gets caught when the human soldiers randomly decide to attack windows where people could be hiding. She manages to avoid them and ends up meeting a young girl who has not transformed. The young girl introduces herself as Shalamy and says that she lives alone in the castle.
21	"Phase 2"; Transliteration: "Fēzu Tsū" (Japanese: フェーズ2)	Tsuyoshi Yoshimoto	Toshizo Nemoto	Hiroshi Hara	November 29, 2023
Vermilio and the search party members they ran into head towards the human base. The awakened humans attempt to infiltrate Shin castle but are intercepted by Shin's forces. The human leader, however, is carefree and indicates that the humans have started multiple massive rampages of monsters to head towards Shin's castle from different directions to overwhelm them. At a separate castle, other humans have infiltrated and are attempting to reach the barrier crystal; however, Hyura, along with a number of other demons, tries to stop them. Mikaros is among the human party and overwhelms Hyura. Edil shows up to finish the job while Mikaros moves forward. Azudra shows up, and Mikaros is shocked, thinking that Azudra was at Shin's castle; however, Azudra explains that a demon was wearing a disguise and acting as him. Mikaros tells Azudra of his past and how they first met, after which they fight, both of them declaring they will finish this now.
22	"Spell Breaker"; Transliteration: "Kaiju" (Japanese: 解呪)	Kōsuke Shimotori	Toshizo Nemoto	Takeshi Mori	December 6, 2023
Hyura and Edil continue their fight; while Hyura is badly injured from her battle against Mikaros, she is still barely holding on. Edil starts showing signs of sympathy towards her and seems conflicted on finishing her off as he likes having her as a rival combatant. Sharuami and Asta are exploring the castle and heading towards the human king. Asta learns that Sharuami is the one who spread the transformation snow due to her special ability; she seems unaware of the disaster she caused. Asta reaches the king; however, the king orders Sharuami to attack her, and due to the king's word of control, Sharuami is unable to resist. Asta is defeated by Sharuami and other transformed humans and then captured. Back on the demon continent, Azudra is fighting Mikaros and winning; however, Mikaros turns the fight around by unleashing all the transformed humans from the control of the king. This turns them all into new world monsters and forces Azudra to expend a great amount of power to defeat them. Edil himself has not transformed due to maintaining his sanity; however, Mikaros uses an ability that incapacitates Edil's thought process and forces him to transform into an exceptionally powerful new world monster.
23	"The Chosen Path"; Transliteration: "Eranda Michi" (Japanese: 選んだ道)	Yasuyuki Fuse	Toshizo Nemoto	Takeshi Mori	December 13, 2023
Helck and Vermilio are discussing what will happen after the king is defeated and if Helck will need to be prepared to kill all the remaining humans if they lose control. While approaching the demon base near the human Kingdom, a scout warns them that a demon attack has mostly wiped the base out. Helck and Vermilio rush towards the base, leaving Piwi and the scouts behind, and face off against a large number of awakened humans and one of the human generals along with an elite female knight.
24	"Towards a Hopeful Future"; Transliteration: "Kibō Aru Mirai e" (Japanese: 希望ある未来へ)	Sō Toyama	Toshizo Nemoto	Tatsuo Sato	December 20, 2023
Vermilio realizes the female knight is Alicia, one of Helck's former friends. While Vermilio has no issue dealing with the winged soldiers or the human general, she is worried Helck might have an emotional breakdown if he confronts and kills Alicia. She reaches out to him and tells him not to give up hope, that they do not necessarily need to kill all the humans and that she will personally work with him to save them if possible. Helck feels reassured after hearing this and calms down. They manage to repel the demon forces, but they hear that Azudra was slain. Vermilio denies that this happened, and they head towards the demon continent, to castle Shin to speak to Azudra.

== Reception ==
In 2015, Helck placed eighth in the first Next Manga Award. In 2017, the series placed fifth in the male category of the Hyakuman Hito ga Erabu Hontō ni Omoshiroi WEB Comic wa Kore da! polls. The series' prequel, Völundio: Divergent Sword Saga, was nominated for the Next Manga Award in the web manga category in 2022 and placed 18th out of 50 nominees.
