= Angelique Luminarise =

2021 Nintendo Switch otome game

- Developer(s): Ruby Party
- Publisher(s): Koei Tecmo
- Series: Angelique
- Platform(s): Nintendo Switch
- Release: JP: May 20, 2021
- Genre(s): Otome, dating sim, visual novel
- Mode(s): Single-player

Angelique Luminarise is an otome game, part of the Angelique series and the first for Nintendo Switch. It was released on May 20, 2021. A special box set version containing drama CDs, titled Angelique Luminarise Treasure Box, was released on the same day as the standard physical and download versions. It is the first new entry in the main Angelique series in 18 years. Publications, as well as KOEI Tecmo, have referred to the title as Anmina (アンミナ) for short. A trial version was published on the Nintendo eShop on May 6, 2021.

The main character is Ange (name can be changed), a 25-year-old single office worker who is beginning to feel at her limits in her third year of working life when she is chosen to become a queen candidate and taken to another world. Her rival is Reina, also a 25 year old worker from the same city. Similar to the original Angelique game (as well as the remake Angelique Retour), there are 9 guardians who can be petitioned for assistance, talked with, or invited or asked on dates. However, the game was updated to better reflect women of today.

An event based on the game, titled Angelique Luminarise: 1st Floating Stage and featuring the voice cast of the 9 guardians (including Hiroki Nanami, Shimba Tsuchiya, Takeo Ōtsuka, Takuya Satō, Yūto Uemura, and Yūki Ono) is scheduled to be held on July 24, 2021, at the Fuchu no Mori Geijutsu Gekijou Dream Hall.
