= Villagers & Heroes =

- Developer: Mad Otter Games
- Publisher: Mad Otter Games
- Director: Damon Slye
- Designers: Cameron England, Stieg Hedlund, Sean Ryan
- Programmers: Clark Fagot, Kevin Ryan, Patrick Ryan, Karan Shah
- Artist: Michelle Taylor
- Writer: Sarah Skibinski
- Engine: Torque 3D
- Platforms: iOS, Android, Microsoft Windows
- Release: October 27, 2011
- Genre: Massively multiplayer online role-playing game
- Mode: Multiplayer

Villagers & Heroes is a free-to-play online massively multiplayer online role-playing game (MMORPG) created by American developer Mad Otter Games. Originally titled A Mystical Land, it was released on October 27, 2011 as a multi-platform game using the Portalarium Player-Plug-In by Richard Garriott's social media games start-up Portalarium, it was later replaced by a standalone C++ client using the Torque-3D engine.

After announcing a name change to Villagers & Heroes on May 15, 2013 and having been greenlighted on December 5, 2013, the game was launched on Valves Steam platform on April 17, 2014 together with its first expansion called The Fury of the Stone Lord. Villagers & Heroes then went multi-platform by releasing a mobile port for Android on October 25, 2016 and for iOS on February 26, 2018.

Players play with all clients on the same server, there are only different servers for different regions like United States, Europe or Latin America, and players can seamlessly switch between different gaming devices in different game sessions.

As of December 2024, Villagers and Heroes has been installed more than 1 million times on Android devices and over 500,000 times on Steam. In total, over 4 million accounts were registered across all platforms. The game is still in active development on all platforms and the latest of what is now 10 expansions, called “The Crux”, was recently published on October 27, 2024. Additional expansions and content upgrades have already been announced.

== Gameplay ==
Villagers & Heroes takes place in the world of Ardent, a medieval fantasy world divided into seven different realms, united under their common ruler King Leo Ulrich. The Seven Realms derives its name from its seven distinct dominions, four eastern (Ardent, Stormhold, Greenhaven, Sunkentooth), and three western (Thorncrest, Halcyon, Glittermore) and are further subdivided into smaller zones. Players can travel throughout Ardent either on foot or mounts or through teleportation. Teleportation requires that the travel pad in the respective zone has previously been discovered. Each zone offers different types of monsters, resources, bounty bosses and quests to challenge players. Players interact with each other through trading, chatting, or by participating in cooperative or collaborative activities like raids, seasonal event zones or by defeating difficult boss-monsters. Villagers & Heroes has no Player versus player combat (PvP).

=== Starting a character or play session ===
Players are represented in the game with customisable avatars. Villagers & Heroes does not follow a linear storyline; rather, as is customary for a sandbox game, players set their own goals and objectives. Players can choose to fight non-player character (NPC) monsters, complete quests, or increase their experience in the available skills.

To enter the game, the player must, after having registered an account, first select a server. There are five different servers for different regions of the world: EU1 (Europe, English speaking), EU2 (Europe, German speaking), LatAm (Latin America, Spanish & Brazilian Portuguese speaking) and US2 and US3 (both North America, English Speaking). Players aren't restricted to a server by their region and can freely choose what server they want to play on. A Player can also play on more than one server, if they choose to. Each account has two character slots per server, but more slots can be acquired in the item shop. It is also possible to move characters between servers for a fee.

After having selected a server, the player then has to create a character according to their specifications. They can choose their appearance (gender, height, face, hair and after the last revision of the character creation in the Haunted Moors expansion also skin color), realm of origin, class and have to choose a unique name for their character. Character names are unique per server. At the end of character creation, players enter the game world in the Elden Forest tutorial zone, where they are then familiarized with the basics of the game with the help of a narrated tutorial quest.

=== Classes ===
Originally Villagers & Heroes offered only four different classes: warrior, wizard, hunter and priest. With "The Tale of Earth and Sea" expansion in 2019, another class, the shaman, was introduced to the game. Each class has two different subclasses, usually one more defensive and one more offensive, which determine the spells and talents the character can use.

By earning experience points through quests and by killing monsters, the character gains levels. Talent points are earned by the character and are used to invest in talents. One talent point is awarded for every level the character gains, and every rank of a talent requires exactly one talent point. On every level that ends in a seven, the character will receive a lucky seven. A lucky seven grants the hero a bonus talent point in additional to their normally awarded talent point. Every class has a unique talent tree where they can choose to invest in talents. Class talents can be proficiencies (traits that are always active and do not require activation), spells (for wizards and priests), or feats (for hunters and warriors).

=== Player interaction ===
Players can interact with each other through trading, chatting, or by participating in other activities that require cooperative or collaborative play like raids, seasonal event zones or by killing world bosses, called Elders in Villagers & Heroes. Players can trade items and gold coins with each other, either through a face-to-face trade or by using an automated auction house.

The chat system enables players to communicate with each other. Chat can either be used to broadcast text publicly, public chat broadcasts text to players in the local area, in world chat, or privately in the form of whispers. There also is a closed guild chat that only members of a guild can use and a separate public chat for trades and looking for group activities.

Groups of people can join in Villagers and Heroes to work as a team; this group is called a party. When players are in a party, the party shares kill credit. If one player of a party initiates an attack on an enemy, then all players in the party and within range will receive credit of the monster and share the rewards. Maximum party size is six players.

Players may also form and join guilds. Unlike parties, Guilds do not get disbanded. Once in a Guild, a character will remain in that guild until they decide to leave or are kicked. All players in a guild will receive a guild tag below their character name. Guilds can work as a group to form their own private village where only guild members can settle. Guild villages can be expanded through guild quests, with better developed villages offering greater advantages to their inhabitants. Players can move into houses in player villages, which can be entered and individually furnished and decorated in the Homestead expansion. Regular seasonal events and raids for groups of up to 15 players also serve to strengthen cooperation and the sense of community between players.

=== Non-player interaction ===
Non-player characters (NPCs) populate the realm of Ardent. Friendly NPCs, such as shopkeepers and quest givers, are unavailable for combat. An icon above the head of an NPC usually indicates that you can interact with them and what you can do. An "!", for example, indicates that you can get a new quest from them or an "*" that you can redeem a quest for a reward.

Most other NPCs can be attacked however and these NPCs are generally referred to as monsters. Monsters range from common, low-level creatures, such as rats or goblins, to unique and often much more powerful monsters, such as Elder Bosses or Zingaras. Most monsters have their own strengths and weaknesses, which makes finding the best attack type and tactic vital for winning the fight, especially when fighting special monsters like elder or event zone bosses. Monsters may either be aggressive or non-aggressive. Non-aggressive monsters ignore players unless attacked, while aggressive monsters may attack all players on sight or may only attack players with combat levels below a specified level. This can make certain zones dangerous and difficult to traverse if a player is lower than the level of the zone he wants to travel through.

=== Quests ===
Quests are an essential part of leveling up a characters combat skill. Quests are tasks that are given to you by non-player characters in the world. They often have requirements including minimum levels in certain skills, combat levels and/or the completion of other quests. Players receive various rewards for completion of quests, including experience points, ingame currency, gatherable materials, weapons or armor etc. All quests are localized on one character. If one character on a players account does a quest, another character can still do that quest! A quest journal exists that keeps track of all quests, including active, finished and abandoned quests. The quest journal also displays extra information such as what needs to be done, what has already been done, what an NPC said, where to go, etc. New quests are released periodically, usually in content upgrades.

== Development ==
=== Graphics and audio ===
Villagers & Heroes can be run with varying levels of graphical detail. High-detail graphics enhance texture and design, while low-detail graphics provide a cleaner look, but result in better performance on less powerful devices. Villagers & Heroes uses Torque 3D, an open-source cross-platform 3D computer game engine, developed and actively maintained by GarageGames. It was originally developed by Dynamix for the 2001 first-person shooter Tribes 2 and was released in September 2012 as open-source software under the MIT License. Torque 3D features PhysX support, modern shader features, an advanced deferred lighting model, as well as build support for Windows, macOS and Linux. According to a former Torque 3D developer, Villagers & Heroes was "probably the biggest and most complex Torque game ever written".

Villagers & Heroes features a character-customisation system. Player characters are human; however, players may choose gender, height, hairstyle, skin colour, origin and class (resulting in different clothing and weapon options). Players can express emotions through the use of emotes and specialized personality animations.

Villagers & Heroes uses royalty-free music and ambient soundscapes. Most tracks, close to 100, were composed by American composer and music producer Kevin MacLeod. Additional music tracks are provided by Geoff Harvey and Chris Martyn and Tiny Speck. Since the Reborn expansion in 2015 the game also incorporates voice acting in important areas of the game, e.g. in the character creation or during the tutorial and the main quest line.

=== List of Expansions ===
Patch	Date	Name	Content	Lvl Cap
2.23	April 17, 2014	Fury of the Stone Lord	Steam Launch, major graphic upgrade, 30 new zones	75
3.00	June 8, 2015	Reborn	Energy/Vim system removed, rebirth system, voiced dialogues	76
3.22	October 25, 2016		Android release	
4.00	September 20, 2017	Starfall	New talent system, 7 new zones, 5th rebirth, new loot system	77
	February 26, 2018		iOS release	
4.14	May 22, 2018	Wellspring	Complete village system, crafting and gathering overhaul	90
4.17	September 24, 2018	Wrath of the Black Thrush	Dungeons added, main story line quest expanded to lvl 35	90
4.28	July 18, 2019	A Tale of Earth and Sea	New character class (Shaman), wardrobe	90
4.32	October 17, 2019	The Haunted Moors	10 new zones, 100 new quests, 600 new bosses	95
4.42	May 18, 2020	Shadow of the Eclipse	Raid system replaces dungeons, new char create	95
5.24	May 15, 2023	Homestead	Fully customizable housing	95
5.32	October 28, 2024	The Crux Part 1	New highlevel zone, new frontier zone, lvl cap raise	97
5.43	April 3, 2025	The Crux Part 2	New highlevel zone, lvl cap raise, Common Sockets	98

== Reception ==
Reception

Aggregate score
Aggregator	Score
Metacritic	82/100

Review scores
Publication	Score
Gamezebo	70/100
TouchArcade	4/5
Mmohuts	3.83/5

Gamezebo stated on May 19, 2011, during the open beta, that "A Mystical Land is otherwise a very solid MMO that isn't really surprising, but does offer a lot of things to do and areas to explore as freely as you'd want. It's probably going to be an excellent diversion for younger players who'll enjoy the role-playing possibilities offered by all of the game's many types of jobs." and gave the game a 70/100 score.

In May 2014, Engadget stated, that "(...)Mad Otter really has something here. In a genre where AAA MMORPGs struggle to stand apart and Kickstarters crash and burn, a clean, successful, thriving indie is a rare delight." While in December of the same year f2p.com commented, that "Villagers and Heroes is an easily accessible, simple and casual theme-park MMORPG. It doesn't try to innovate or improve the genre, and just wraps the most loved elements and features from the classic WoW-style MMORPG formula in a light and family friendly package".

Mmohuts.com commented on the new Villagers & Heroes Android client, that "Overall, Villagers & Heroes Mobile will be a fantastic experience I suggest you head to the Play store as soon as its available and start playing!".

In their April 2018 article TouchArcade called Villagers & Heroes "(...) a traditional 3D MMO that not only looks beautiful, but also offers a plethora of great features and systems in what seems to be one of the most compelling mobile MMOs yet. With a world that draws inspiration from games like World of Warcraft both in terms of design and gameplay."

=== Awards ===
- Best Casual Download MMO - MMO of the Year 2012 Awards
- Bestest Ever - 2013 Friendie Awards
- Best MMORPG App of 2017 - Appliv
- Best Mobile MMO of 2017 Readers Choice - Massivelyop
- 2019 Indie MMO Of the Year - Massivelyop
- MMO Housing of the Year 2023 - Massivelyop
