= Stieg Hedlund =

American video game designer

- Stieg Hedlund
- Born: 1965 (age 60–61); Portland, Oregon
- Occupations: Game designer, video game artist, writer

Stieg Hedlund (born 1965) is a computer and video game designer, artist, and writer who has worked on more than thirty games in the video game industry. He is best known for his work in action RPGs, and has also worked on games on real-time strategy, tactical shooter, beat-'em-up and action-adventure games.

In 2009, he was chosen by IGN as one of the top 100 game creators of all time.

== Career ==
Hedlund began his career at Japanese publisher Koei in 1990, which had established a North American subsidiary, Koei Corporation, in California two years earlier. Working at Koei both in Northern California and Japan, he either created or was the lead designer for a number of games including Liberty or Death, Celtic Tales: Balor of the Evil Eye, Gemfire and Saiyuki: Journey West. In 1995, shortly after Hedlund left the company, the subsidiary ceased its game development efforts.

After working on an unreleased Lord of the Rings–based title for Electronic Arts in the early ’90s, Hedlund began working for the Sega Technical Institute (STI) in 1994, where, as an artist and game designer, he worked on titles like Comix Zone, The Ooze and Sonic X-treme. He also worked on Die Hard Arcade, collaborating with members of Sega’s AM1 division.

In 1996, three years after he first interviewed with the company, Hedlund joined Condor and took on the lead design role for Diablo; three months before its release, Blizzard acquired Condor and renamed the company Blizzard North. Diablo would go on to become one of the most highly rated games of 1996.

In the wake of Diablo’s success, Hedlund designed Diablo II which performed well (For more details, visit Diablo II Awards and Sales).

While at Blizzard, he also participated in the design of both StarCraft and the Diablo II: Lord of Destruction expansion pack. StarCraft was the best-selling PC game of 1998 and received numerous Game of the Year awards. Diablo II: LOD was released in 2001, and helped to “reinforce the staying power of an already legendary RPG”. It too received numerous awards, including several for Best Expansion Pack of the Year, and tied with Baldur’s Gate II for Best RPG of the Year.

On April 17, 2000, Hedlund announced that he would be leaving Blizzard North “as soon as his responsibilities for Diablo II (had) been fulfilled” in order to start a new game-development firm called Full-On Amusement Company with business partners, programmers, and artists from Virgin Interactive, Sega, Sony Computer Entertainment, Electronic Arts, and Maxis. During this time, Hedlund collaborated with director David Lynch on his unreleased Woodcutters from Fiery Ships game project.

Later in 2000, Hedlund joined Konami as the company’s Creative Director and worked on titles such as the Frogger and Contra series. In 2002, he went to work as Creative Director for Ubisoft/ Red Storm Entertainment on games such as Tom Clancy’s Ghost Recon 2 and Tom Clancy’s Rainbow Six: Lockdown, as well as contributing to Tom Clancy’s Ghost Recon: Advanced Warfighter. He also spent some time with Oddworld Inhabitants doing foundational work for Oddworld: Stranger’s Wrath.

Beginning in August 2004, Hedlund signed on with Perpetual Entertainment as design director for Gods & Heroes: Rome Rising, officially announced in March 2005. The game was shown at E3 2006 and received several “Best of Show” awards, with particular notice being paid to its innovative “minion” system. Although it was well into “content complete” beta testing by September 2007, the technology behind the game could not be stabilized, and after numerous delays and several rounds of layoffs the game was “indefinitely suspended” in mid-October 2007 even as further stability testing was underway. The game was published in June 2011.

After Perpetual closed in 2008, Hedlund continued his career in game development across both independent studios and large commercial publishers.

Seeing the growing mass-market potential of free-to-play and social games, Hedlund founded Turpitude, a design consultancy that worked with clients including Disney, Zynga, and Playdom on monetization systems and social gameplay design. He also presented talks on game design during this period, including Sticky from the Start at the 2008 Game Developers Conference, which examined player retention and engagement in social games.

In 2010, Turpitude secured seed funding and pivoted to social game development, releasing Wedding Street in partnership with The Knot magazine.

During this period, Hedlund also worked with Mad Otter Games as a designer on the MMORPG Villagers & Heroes, which was released in 2011.

Later in 2011, Hedlund joined San Francisco–based studio nWay Games, where he served as Vice President of Creative on the action role-playing game ChronoBlade. Developed for web and mobile platforms, the game was released internationally through regional publishing partnerships. In South Korea, ChronoBlade was published by Netmarble, with nWay expanding its development operations to include a studio in Seoul during the game’s global rollout.

In 2015, nWay announced a partnership with NetEase to publish ChronoBlade (simplified Chinese: 时空之刃, shíkōng zhī rèn pinyin, “Blade of Time and Space”) in mainland China, following its unveiling at a NetEase press event in Beijing. Hedlund worked extensively with development and publishing teams in Seoul and Hangzhou during this period.

Following his tenure at nWay, Hedlund held senior creative and design leadership roles at Zynga and its London-based subsidiary Gram Games, where he served as Vice President of Creative. During this period, he contributed to the development and live operation of mobile titles including Merge Dragons!, which became one of Gram Games’ most commercially successful releases and a significant part of Zynga’s mobile portfolio following its acquisition of the studio.

While living in London, Hedlund was recruited as Vice President of Design for King’s New Games division. Following Microsoft’s acquisition of Activision Blizzard, King leadership indicated that the company shifted focus toward maintaining and evolving existing titles rather than launching new games globally. In a 2024 interview, King’s president stated that several test projects remained under evaluation and that development on Rebel Riders had been paused to prioritize other initiatives.

In 2023, Hedlund was appointed Vice President of Design at UK-based fitness gaming company Quell for its debut title Shardfall, following a $10 million Series A funding round led by Tencent. Press coverage highlighted the game’s blend of fitness and gameplay, with reviewers noting its engaging mix of combat and cardio while also citing technical issues such as performance inconsistencies.

In 2024, Quell announced it would discontinue active development of the Impact hardware platform, citing financial sustainability concerns. The company transitioned Shardfall to a perpetual offline version following the discontinuation of live services.

== Recognition and awards ==
IGN named Hedlund as one of the top 100 game creators of all time (number 62). The Escapist ranked Hedlund fourth on its list of “Eight Game Design Legends,” while GamesRadar placed him fifteenth among the “30 game developers you should know.” His games have an average rating of 88%, and have received numerous awards including:

Die Hard Arcade was ranked number 25 on GamesRadar’s list of the best Sega Saturn games of all time.

Diablo received numerous awards upon release, including Game of the Year honors from Computer Gaming World, Computer Game Entertainment, and the PC Games Editors’ Choice Awards, as well as Role-Playing Game of the Year awards from Computer Games Strategy Plus, Computer Net Player, and others. The game was later inducted into GameSpot’s list of the greatest games of all time and named among the most important PC games by PCGamesN.

StarCraft: GameSpot’s Greatest Games of All Time, Academy of Interactive Arts & Sciences Game of the Year, Computer Gaming World Game of the Year, PC PowerPlay’s Game of the Year, PC Gamer’s Real-time strategy Game of the Year, Games Domain Strategy Game of the Year, GameInformer’s 35th Greatest Game of All Time.

Diablo II: Guinness Book of World Records Fastest Selling Computer Game Ever Sold, Interactive Achievement Awards Computer Game of the Year, Interactive Achievement Awards Computer Role Playing Game of the Year, Interactive Achievement Awards Game of the Year, PC Gamer No. 16 “50 Best Games of All Time”, PC Gamer No. 82 “Top 100 Games", Computer and Video Games No. 25, “The 101 Best PC Games Ever”, GamePro No. 11 “The 32 Best PC Games”, Destructoid No. 7 “Top Video Games of the Decade”.

Tom Clancy’s Ghost Recon: Advanced Warfighter received the BAFTA Games Awards for Best Game and Technical Achievement in 2006.

Gods & Heroes: Rome Rising was well received at the 2006 Electronic Entertainment Expo (E3), earning multiple show awards from independent media outlets, including Allakhazam’s Best of Show Award, TenTonHammer’s Best of Show Award, MMORPG.com’s Game of Show and Best Graphics Awards, Stratics’ Best Gameplay Award, and GameAmp’s Best Gameplay Award.
