= Hiroki Nanami =

Japanese actress and singer

- 七海ひろき
- Born: January 16, Mito, Ibaraki, Japan
- Education: Takarazuka Music School
- Known for: Acting, music, voice acting
- Website: hiroki773.com

Hiroki Nanami (七海ひろき, Nanami Hiroki) is a Japanese actress, singer, voice actress, and former otokoyaku (male role) star of the Takarazuka Revue (2003–2019).

== Troupe History ==
- 2003–2015, Cosmos Troupe
- 2015–2019, Star Troupe

== Biography ==
Unlike many Takarasiennes, Nanami Hiroki’s life pre-Takarazuka was not marked with an abundance of performing arts experience. Rather, with a brother two years older, from a young age she'd roleplay the heroes in stories and do other boys' things. She was class representative every year of elementary school, an honor student in whom the teachers placed great faith.

In her 6th year of elementary school, she happened to catch Takarazuka Moon Troupe's "Gone with the Wind" on television. She fell immediately in love with the star, Amami Yuuki, and began collecting all the shows she appeared in on video and watching them on repeat. A year later, Nanami went to see Amami Yuuki live for the first time in "Me And My Girl," and made the decision that she wanted to enter Takarazuka.

Though she had no previous dance experience, after entering middle school, Nanami enrolled in a ballet class in Tokyo that her father found specifically for those aspiring to enter the Takarazuka Music School. Once a week, she commuted 5 hours round trip from her home in Ibaraki to attend.

She entered a high-level high school and her parents gave her the ultimatum that she couldn't take the exam to enter the Takarazuka music school if her school grades slipped, so she worked hard on her studies and took her lessons simultaneously She passed the Takarazuka exam in her second year of high school on her second try.

Her stage name, "Nanami" takes one character from her real name ("Mi" from "海," "Sea"), combined with "Nana" ("七," "Seven") from the name of a character she liked from the anime "Tico of the Seven Seas." "Hiroki" (which can contain the character for "vast" in Japanese) comes from the vastness of the ocean.

After graduating from the Takarazuka music school, she made her onstage debut in 2003 in Moon troupe’s Takarazuka Floral Diaries/ Senor Don Juan. She was then assigned to Cosmos troupe, where she would stay until 2015. During her time in Cosmos troupe, she was given the opportunity to play many different background roles, and in 2009, she received her first and only shinjinkouen (young performers) lead role, Justin in Raindrops Fall on Roses. In 2011, she was cast in a female role, Natacha Rambova in Valentino- playing the wife to then-Top Star Oozora Yuuhi. In 2013, Nanami had her first true theatrical lead in a Western-themed musical titled The Wild Meets The Wild. Following this, she was cast as Scarlett O’Hara in Gone With the Wind.

During her time in Cosmos troupe, Nanami was also offered a voice acting role in an anime, an uncommon occurrence for a current Takarazuka actress, and in 2014, she voiced the character of Uesugi Kenshin in Satelight’s Nobunaga the Fool.

In 2015 Nanami was transferred from Cosmos troupe into Star troupe, where she would spend the rest of her time in Takarazuka. Through her time In Star troupe, Nanami progressed to playing larger roles, from the lead role of Takenaka Shigeharu in Strategist Takenaka Hanbei, to Shou Fu Kan in both the local productions and overseas tour of the stage adaptation of Thunderbolt Fantasy, a Taiwanese puppet drama. In 2019, Nanami decided to retire from the Takarazuka revue, stating that she had: “...decided I wanted to leave at the time when I could show my fans the best possible otokoyaku I could be."

Nanami Hiroki resigned from the Takarazuka revue on March 24, 2019, after sixteen years as an actress with the company.

== Post-Takarazuka career ==
Three months after her retirement from the Takarazuka Revue, Nanami announced her signing with Andstir entertainment and the King Records music label.

She made her post-Takarazuka artist debut with the release of her first mini album, 'Galaxy', and an accompanying one-man live show with a four-concert run in Tokyo and Osaka. At the same time, she announced her post-Takarazuka seiyuu debut as Shizuno in Satelight’s Somali and the Forest Spirit.

On November 8, 2019, she was instated as a cultural ambassador for Ibaraki Prefecture.

Her first theatrical performance post-Takarazuka was the titular role of Red, in Red and Bear, an original musical which ran from January 24, 2020, to February 2, 2020, at the Sunshine Theatre in Ikebukuro, Tokyo, Japan.

In addition to her voiceover, theatrical, and musical work, Nanami has hosted weekly radio shows such as 七つの海への大航海, (‘nanatsu no umi e no dai koukai’, A Voyage to the Seven Seas) on Tokyo FM, and a television program on the Takarazuka Revue’s television channel, Takarazuka Skystage. Her self-produced television program, ときめきタカラヅカSTYLE (‘Tokimeki Takarazuka Style’), originally slated for a limited eight-episode run, extended to twelve episodes and ended in September 2020.

In March 2021, Nanami announced her move to King Amusement Creative, a label shared by several well-known voice actors, including Megumi Hayashibara and Nana Mizuki, and a third musical album (FIVESTAR.)

== Notable Roles in Takarazuka ==
- Beside the Foggy Elbe / Estrellas, Tobias
- Thunderbolt Fantasy / Amazing Star☆Killer Rouge, Shāng Bù Huàn
- Another World / Killer Rouge, Kiroku
- Om Shanti Om, Mukesh
- The Scarlet Pimpernel, Maximilien Robespierre
- Strategist Takenaka Hanbei, Takenaka Shigeharu
- Guys and Dolls, Benny Southstreet
- Catch Me If You Can, Carl Hanratty
- Top Hat, Horace Hardwick
- The Rose of Versailles, Oscar
- Gone with the Wind, Scarlett O'Hara
- The Wild Meets the Wild, Benjamin Northbrook
- Legend of the Galactic Heroes, Paul von Oberstein, Wolfgang Mittermeyer
- Valentino, Natacha Rambova
- Gin-chan's Love, Makoto
- The Second Life, Mark White

=== Notable shinjinkouen (young star) roles ===
- Casablanca, Victor Laszlo
- Raindrops Fall on Roses, Justin
- Phantom, Phantom's Follower

== Notable post-Takarazuka works ==
=== Stage ===
- Reiwa Senbonzakura ~ Yoshitsune to Benkei / Korokke Monomane, Yoshitsune
- Elizabeth 25th Anniversary Gala, Rudolf
- Road 59, Hyuuga Shion
- Red and Bear, Red
- Frankenstein - cry for the moon, Frankenstein/ Mr Barefoot
- Gegege no Kitaro, Amanojaku - Rin

=== Touken Ranbu ===
- Kahakugeki Butai Touken Ranbu/ Tomoshibi - K̶i̶d̶e̶n̶ ̶I̶k̶u̶s̶a̶ ̶Y̶u̶ ̶n̶o̶ ̶A̶d̶a̶b̶a̶n̶a̶ - Kaihen Kiden Ikusa Yu no Adabana no Kioku, Hosokawa Gracia
- Kiden Ikusa Yu no Adabana, Hosokawa Gracia
- Guden Mujun Genji Monogatari, Kasen Kanesada

=== Live musical performances ===
- Summer Tour 2021
- Kingdom Online Summer Live
- Adachi House Festival “~You&I Peace&Love~”
- One-man LIVE 773 “GALAXY”
- Hiroki Nanami ZEPP Live tour "COLORS"

=== Albums ===
- FIVESTAR
- Kingdom
- Galaxy

=== Voice acting ===
- Nobunaga the Fool (2014), Uesugi Kenshin
- Somali and the Forest Spirit (2020), Shizuno
- Oda Cinnamon Nobunaga (2020), Hideto Mitsu
- Uchi Tama!? ~Uchi no Tama Shirimasen ka?~ (2020), Kai (episode 7)
- Gibiate (2020), Ayame Hatonami
- Pretty Boy Detective Club (2021), Rei
- Yasuke (2021), Nikiita
- Kageki Shojo!! (2021), Sei Satomi
- Night Head 2041 (2021), Naoto Kirihara (young)
- Visual Prison (2021), Eve Louise
- Shaman King (2021), Hao Asakura
- Insect Land (2022), Theo
- RWBY: Ice Queendom (2022), Shion Zaiden
- Mashle (2023), Abyss Razor
- Rokudo's Bad Girls (2023), Aoi Furukawa
- Helck (2023), Edil
- Good Night World (2023), Sasumata
- The Concierge at Hokkyoku Department Store (2023), Male Peacock
- The Apothecary Diaries (2023), Joka
- Sengoku Youko (2024), Senya
- Yatagarasu: The Raven Does Not Choose Its Master (2024), Hamayū
- Too Many Losing Heroines! (2024), Hibari Hōkobaru
- Aquarion: Myth of Emotions (2025), Sun
- Reincarnated as a Neglected Noble: Raising My Baby Brother with Memories from My Past Life (2025), Laala
- Gnosia (2025), Raqio
- Magical Sisters LuluttoLilly (2026), Uguisu
- Red River (2026), Satoshi Himuro, Narrator
- My Stepmother and Stepsisters Aren't Wicked (2026), Sadame Mikuriya
- Pickles the Frog
- Jack Jeanne (Nintendo Switch), Tancho Midori
- Angelique Luminarise (Nintendo Switch), Noa
- Arctic Dogs (Japanese dub), Swifty
- I Saw the TV Glow (Japanese dub), Maddy Wilson

=== TV Shows/Dramas ===
- Tokimeki Takarazuka Style
- Mystery Murders Theatre
- How I Attended an All-Guy's Mixer (2022), Suou

=== Books/other ===
- N (photobook)
- 恋って何ですか？ (essay compilation)
- Tokyo FM Radio Show: 七つの海への大航海
- .773 (photobook)
- TS ONE United Radio Show: ～☆でぃあれすと☆〜
- Takarazuka Personal Book volume 4- Nanami Hiroki
