= Liberty or Death (video game) =

1993 video game

- Developer: Koei
- Publisher: Koei
- Designer: Stieg Hedlund
- Platforms: PC-98, MS-DOS, Super NES, Genesis
- Release: PC-98: JP: September 27, 1993; MS-DOS: NA: 1993; Super NES: JP: March 18, 1994; NA: 1994; Genesis: NA: 1994
- Genre: Turn-based strategy
- Modes: Single-player, multiplayer

Liberty or Death is a turn-based strategy video game for NEC PC-9801, MS-DOS, Super NES, and Sega Genesis released by Koei in 1993 and 1994 respectively. It is part of Koei's Historical Simulation Series.

== Gameplay ==
The game is set during the American Revolutionary War. The player can choose to control any of six Commanders-in-Chief (C-in-C), three each on the American Continental Army or British Army sides.

For either side, the general objective is to eliminate all enemy troops throughout the Thirteen Colonies by defeating them in battle. The strategies used to accomplish this change are based on which side the player has chosen: the American side needs to hold out against the British and slowly gather its strength, while the British need to fortify their existing positions and quickly move against the Americans.

The gameplay focuses mainly on the military aspects of the conflict, but relationships with civilian, and particularly political, entities are of vital importance as their approval determines the budget for military spending, and in the worst-case scenario, they can vote for your ouster as C-in-C. Very historically accurate, the game faithfully reproduces the strategic situation of the war as well as many historical figures in great detail.

Liberty or Death is known among players for its thoroughly researched historical detail, great complexity, level of difficulty, and the immense amount of time it takes to complete one game (similar to the experience of other Koei games). One could easily spend upwards of 250 hours on one game and might still be defeated in the end. The user interface showed many improvements over previous Koei games, including mouse support. The game can be played in one-player mode, two-player mode, or zero-player mode (i.e., with two computer AIs playing against each other).

=== Beginning the game ===
The player begins by selecting which side to play, the British or the American, and then must select which Commander-in-Chief will represent their side. The choices are George Washington, Artemas Ward, or Charles Lee for the Americans, and Thomas Gage, Sir Henry Clinton, or William Howe for the British. (In the console versions, players cannot choose their Commander-in-Chief. George Washington and Thomas Gage are the leaders of their respective sides.) Each turn lasts half of a month, for a total of 24 turns per year. The Continental Congress or British Parliament (depending on which side the player has chosen) meets quarterly to set the budget for military spending over the next three months (equivalent to six turns), and the player chooses to allocate the funds between the navy, the districts he controls, to pay debts and salaries, and various other concerns. He can also set general strategy with his naval forces that are not under his direct control.

In each month, the player manages the military affairs for each district (as do any commanders they have authorized to do so on their own, as well as the enemy and his commanders). There is a number of actions that the player can take in each district he has, including purchasing materials, bribing enemy generals, holding parades to gain popular support, and training his troops, among many other options.

An interesting facet of Liberty or Death is that there are also Patriot and Loyalist militia regiments and German mercenary regiments, organized and paid for by the Americans and British, respectively, which will fight and collect resources on their own, unless they are recruited. These groups will continue to run the districts they are in and can also attack and annex adjacent districts if they choose to. If a regular commander for their side moves into the district, these militia units will place themselves under his authority if he is of equal or higher rank, swelling his ranks.

=== Battles ===
The strategy phase exists to set up the tactical battles, which take place on hex-grid battlefields, with each hex representing a terrain type, some of which also show seasonal changes. Allied troops in districts adjoining the one where a battle is taking place can be asked to join the fray as well. Commanders place their armies on the field depending on which district they have entered from (and the navy can be used to transport troops into battle as well if there is coastal access to the district). The troops can then be maneuvered around the battlefield and finally into combat.

There is a variety of unit types with different abilities, both in battle and in moving across the various types of terrain. Infantry is a basic ground unit, while guerrilla units can move through terrain impassable to others and use surprise attacks; cavalry requires open terrain, but their shock charges can be devastating to foot troops; engineers use cannons as artillery and can also create and destroy bridges. In coastal districts, naval barrages can also be brought to bear. Defenders have to protect their forts and towns from the enemy while attackers have to try to either take the cities and forts or eliminate the opposing troops before running out of men or materiel themselves.

== Reception ==
Reception

Review score
| Publication | Score |
|---|---|
| Electronic Gaming Monthly | 7/10, 7/10, 4/10, 4/10 (GEN) |

Liberty or Death met with mixed or average reviews from game critics. Reviewing the Super NES version, Andromeda of GamePro praised the historical accuracy but was reluctant to recommend the game due to the excessive minutiae of the gameplay, concluding, "Despite the more familiar history, Liberty or Death is still probably foreign fare for most gamers. The huge amount of detail makes these absorbing simulations an acquired taste." Electronic Gaming Monthly's team of five critics gave it a relatively modest score of 6.6 out of 10, but the review by Mike Weigand (who gave it a 7 out of 10) was thoroughly laudatory, commenting that "Koei is becoming the master of the historical strategy games."

GamePro's Bro Buzz declared the Sega Genesis version to be "exactly like the SNES version", but was more critical of the game than Andromeda, particularly the visual interface, commenting that "you must be content with studying changing numbers rather than watching exciting graphics or listening to satisfying sounds."
