= Gemfire =

1991 video game

- North American NES box art (Note: Similar cover art was later used for the Genesis and MS-DOS versions.)
- Developer: Koei
- Publisher: Koei
- Platforms: NES, Super NES, PC-88, PC-98, MSX, X68000, FM Towns, Genesis, MS-DOS, Windows
- Release: August 29, 1991: NES; JP: August 29, 1991; NA: March 1992 PC-88; JP: September 27, 1991 PC-98; JP: December 21, 1991 MSX; JP: 1991 X68000; JP: March 27, 1992 FM Towns; JP: May 1992 Genesis; JP: June 25, 1992; NA: November 1992 SNES; JP: October 22, 1992; NA: December 1992 MS-DOS; NA: 1992 Windows; JP: August 22, 2003
- Genres: Turn-based strategy, role-playing
- Modes: Single-player, multiplayer

Gemfire (Note: Known in Japan as Royal Blood (Japanese: ロイヤルブラッド, Hepburn: Roiyaru Buraddo). Titled Super Royal Blood in the Super Famicom version (Japanese: スーパーロイヤルブラッド, Hepburn: Sūpā Roiyaru Buraddo)) is a 1991 role-playing strategy video game developed and published by Koei for the Nintendo Entertainment System and later ported to Japanese home computers, Super NES, Genesis, MS-DOS, and Windows. The object in the game is to unify a fictional island by force. Players use a variety of units, such as archers, infantry and dragons, in order to capture the castle needed to control that particular territory.

A sequel, Royal Blood II: Chronicles of the Kingdom of Dinar, (Note: Japanese language: ロイヤルブラッドII 〜ディナール王国年代記〜) was released in Japan for Windows.

== Gameplay ==
The tactics screen is the place where a majority of strategic actions are performed. The right side of the screen shows the world map and which territories are controlled by whom. The left side of the screen shows the player's current resources and available actions they can take.

At the outset of the game, the player has the option of selecting a scenario and house. All four scenarios use the same game board, but they differ in which houses are present and what provinces, vassals and gems they have. Ultimately, the player must conquer the entire map to win the game.

Gameplay is divided into the main tactics screen and individual battle screens. On the tactics screen, the player is allowed one action per turn (in-game month) per territory. With that action, the player may hire or move troops, upgrade the territory's economy or defenses, engage in diplomatic actions (such as plunder an adjacent province or propose alliance with another house), or attack an enemy territory.

Only adjacent territories may be attacked. Upon attacking or being attacked by an enemy, the focus shifts to battle, wherein a player may field five units (archers, knights, horsemen, and either a wizard or a hired unit). The player moves individual companies of troops about the map in a turn-based tactics fashion; certain units may build fences to keep enemies out. One army wins if the enemy base is captured, all enemy units are defeated, or the enemy army runs out of food.

== Plot ==
Gemfire takes place on the fictitious Isle of Ishmeria. Long ago, six wizards, each wielding a unique brand of magic, used their powers to protect the island and maintain peace. This was disrupted when they were collectively challenged by a Fire Dragon, summoned forth by a wizard intent on plunging the country into darkness. The sea-dwelling dragon of peace known as the Pastha charged the six wizards with the task of fighting back. They succeeded, sealing the Fire Dragon away into a ruby at the top of a crown, and themselves became the six jewels around the crown's base. The crown, called Gemfire, became a symbol of utmost power and authority.

When Gemfire fell into the hands of King Eselred of House Lankshire, he sought to abuse the object's power, using it to embark on a tyrannical reign, instilling fear within his oppressed subjects. His young daughter, Princess Robyn, being unable to bear with her father's grievous misdeeds any longer, seized Gemfire and pried the six wizard gems loose, causing them to shoot upward into the sky before scattering themselves to different parts of Ishmeria. Before she could loose the ruby, she was caught by a furious Eselred, who had her locked away in a tower.

Meanwhile, the six wizard gems each took up residence with a prominent house of Ishmeria. The two most powerful of these houses are House Blanche, led by Prince Erin and supported by Zendor, Emerald Wizard and Wielder of Lightning; and House Lyle, led by Prince Ander and backed by Pluvius, Sapphire Wizard and Caster of Meteors. Four other houses (Flax, Coryll, Chrysalis and Molbrew) also have wizards (Scylla, Empyron, Chylla and Skulryk respectively) of Gemfire at their disposal in the beginning. There are also a few lesser houses who start without a wizard, but by performing well in the game, the Pastha may choose to offer support. With the breaking of the spell on Gemfire, each of these houses sets out to unseat Eselred, claim the throne as their own and restore order and peace to Ishmeria.

== Reception ==
Reception

Review scores
Publication	Score			
Publication	DOS	NES	Sega Genesis	SNES
Famitsu		24/40	25/40	23/40
PC Player	65/100			
Playtime			77/100	
Questicle.net		D		

Gemfire has received mixed reception from critics.

Writing for Questicle.net, Dylan Cornelius criticized the game for being too difficult to get into, citing the game as having an overwhelming amount of things to do. The reviewer concluded that, while the game could hold the attention of Koei and strategy game fans, because the game fails to teach its rules properly, it couldn't be recommended by them.

== Legacy ==
On May 21, 1999, a sequel to Gemfire entitled Royal Blood II: Chronicles of the Kingdom of Dinar was released exclusively in Japan for Microsoft Windows computer operating systems.
