= Keiko Erikawa =

Japanese businesswoman and game designer

- 襟川 恵子
- Born: January 3, 1949 (age 77); Yokohama, Kanagawa, Japan
- Education: Tama Art University
- Years active: 1978-present
- Employer: Koei Tecmo

Keiko Erikawa is a Japanese businesswoman and video game designer. She co-founded Koei Tecmo Holdings Co., Ltd., a Japanese game development company, with her husband Yoichi Erikawa in 1978.

== Career and education ==
Keiko is a design graduate of Tama Art University. She manages Koei Tecmo's assets across Japan, Hong Kong and the U.S. She retired from her place on Koei Tecmo's financial board, but is continuing to work as a CEO for one of their subsidiary projects.

== Philanthropy ==
Keiko contributes to charity through the Foundation of Erikawa Education. The organisation focuses on providing scholarships to students from single-mother families.
