= Celtic Tales: Balor of the Evil Eye =

1995 strategy video game

- Developer: Koei
- Publisher: Koei
- Designers: Julie Carlson; David Johnson; Stieg Hedlund
- Platforms: DOS, Windows
- Release: 1995
- Genre: Strategy
- Mode: Single-player

Celtic Tales: Balor of the Evil Eye is a 1995 strategy video game developed and published by Koei for DOS and Windows.

== Gameplay ==
Celtic Tales: Balor of the Evil Eye is a strategy game in which the player is a Celtic chieftain.

== Development ==
Celtic Tales: Balor of the Evil Eye was primarily created by a group of US designers for Japanese developer Koei. The lead, Julie Carlson, was originally hired by the company as a Japanese-to-English translator for in-game text and instruction manuals before expanding her roles into design and scenario writing for titles like Aerobiz, Romance of the Three Kingdoms III: Dragon of Destiny, and Genghis Khan II: Clan of the Gray Wolf. For Celtic Tales, she would remotely correspond with Koei via fax, sending work then receiving and making corrections each day. When devising the game's rune spells, Carlson hoped that the transition to CD-ROM technology would alleviate problems due to time constraints. The other main conceiver and designer, David Johnson, had been the US development manager of a majority of Koei releases starting in May 1990. He admitted that having an international team for Celtic Tales was not planned and that conflict was a regular hurdle with the collaboration, but that the process was ultimately helpful and stimulating. Koei released the game in Japan on Windows 3.1 as Celt no Seisan (ケルトの聖戦, Keruto no Seisen; "Celtic Holy War"). A novel adaptation written by Nadine Crenshaw was published Prima Lifestyles on December 22, 1995.

== Reception ==
Reception

Review scores
Publication	Score
Computer Game Review	91/100
Computer Gaming World	3.5/5
Next Generation	4/5
PC Gamer (US)	87%
Dimension-3	82%
Electronic Entertainment	2.8/5
Fusion	B
Level	80/100
PC Joker	69%
PC Player	58/100
Power Play	49%
Score	8/10
Secret Service	87.5%

Next Generation rated the game four stars out of five, and stated that "As well made as it is [...] Balor is not for everyone. The game's intense complexity of play will make it unaccessible for all but the most devoted and persistent of strategy gurus. If you're the kind of player who likes to rip into a game without the instruction manual, this game will leave you completely cold." Computer Game Review was strongly positive, awarding the game a "Golden Triad" score, and the magazine's Tasos Kaiafas wrote, "For a game that involves many hours to reach the end, Celtic Tales should hold your interest all the way to the finish."
