= Haruka: Beyond the Stream of Time (manga) =

Manga series

遙かなる時空の中で ～八葉抄～ (Harukanaru Toki no Naka De ~Hachiyou Shou~)
- Genre: Fantasy, romance
- Manga

Haruka: Beyond the Stream of Time
- Written by: Tohko Mizuno
- Published by: Hakusensha
- English publisher: US: Viz Media
- Magazine: LaLa DX
- English magazine: US: Shojo Beat
- Original run: July 1999 – January 2010
- Volumes: 17
- Anime television series

Haruka: Beyond the Stream of Time: A Tale of the Eight Guardians
- Directed by: Aki Tsunaki
- Studio: Yumeta Company
- Original network: TXN (TV Tokyo, TV Aichi, TV Osaka)
- Original run: October 5, 2004 – March 29, 2005
- Episodes: 26
- Original video animation

Harukanaru Toki no Naka de Hachiyō Shō
- Directed by: Aki Tsunaki
- Studio: Yumeta Company
- Released: December 23, 2005 – January 27, 2006
- Episodes: 2
- Anime film

Harukanaru Toki no Naka de: Maihitoyo
- Directed by: Toshiya Shinohara
- Studio: Yumeta Company
- Released: August 19, 2006
- Runtime: 104 minutes

Harukanaru Toki no Naka de (遙かなる時空(とき)の中で) is a Japanese shōjo manga series written by Tohko Mizuno who also worked on the video game of the same name, which was developed by Ruby Party and published by Koei. The manga was serialized in LaLa DX magazine from July 1999 to January 2010, and published by Hakusensha in 17 volumes. An English version was licensed by Viz Media under the title Haruka: Beyond the Stream of Time. The storyline initially follows the characters and events from the first installment of the video game series. An anime series titled Harukanaru Toki no Naka de ~Hachiyou Shou~ (遙かなる時空の中で ～八葉抄～) was developed by Yumeta Company with Aki Tsunaki directing, with 26 episodes broadcast from October 5, 2004, to March 29, 2005. The anime has been released in an English-subtitled version as Haruka: Beyond the Stream of Time: A Tale of the Eight Guardians.

== Setting ==
Although an exact time period is not given for Akane's arrival in Heian Kyou, it seems likely that the story is set in the earlier part of the era, when families such as the Tachibana-ke, Fujiwara-ke and Minamoto-ke were all in some prominence. Though the Fujiwara-ke and Minamoto-ke continued to hold significant position through until the Genpei war, the Tachibana-ke faded out of favor during the 9th and 10th centuries. This suggests that Harukanaru Toki no Naka de is set sometime in the 9th or 10th centuries. This would also fit with later continuations of the Harukanaru Toki no Naka de plot, since Harukanaru Toki no Naka de 2 is set a century later, and features prominently once more the Fujiwara-ke and Minamoto-ke, as well as the Taira-ke. The third installment, Harukanaru Toki no Naka de 3 is set in the period of the Genpei War, which came to an end in 1185. If it can be considered that the third installment is set a century on from the second, this would indicate that the original Harukanaru Toki no Naka de storyline is most probably set in the latter half of the 10th century.

== Plot ==
On her walk to school, ordinary Kyoto High school student Motomiya Akane hears a voice calling to her from an old well in an abandoned historical estate. The voice is that of the oni leader Akuram, and Akane finds herself summoned into another world that resembles the city of Kyoto during the Heian Period (approx. 800–1200). Here she is asked to be the Ryuujin no Miko (龍神の神子, Priestess of the Dragon God), a legendary figure who possesses the power of the gods. Akane is told that she must defend this world, called Kyou (京), from the encroachment of the Oni Clan (鬼の一族) before she can return home. Fortunately, her school friends Tenma and Shimon are on hand to help her out and along with six Kyou natives they become members of the Hachiyou (八葉, Eight Leaves), a group of specially chosen men who act as the Miko's protectors.

== Characters ==
=== Main characters ===
Akane Motomiya (元宮あかね, Motomiya Akane)
Voiced by: Tomoko Kawakami
A modern high school girl, Akane is transported to the Heian era and recognized as the Ryuujin no Miko, or Priestess of the Dragon God. She carries the power of the Dragon God within her body such that she can purify impurities from contact. Though reluctant to use her powers as priestess, Akane is determined to do the right thing. She is innocent and kindhearted, which sometimes leads her into trouble.

==== The Eight Guardians ====
Minamoto no Yorihisa (源頼久)
Voiced by: Shin-ichiro Miki
One of Princess Fuji's bodyguards, who comes to protect Akane as well. He becomes one of the Eight Guardians, as Seiryū of Heaven (天の青龍). He is the strong, silent type and will do anything his mistress asks of him.
Tenma Morimura (森村天真, Morimura Tenma)
Voiced by: Tomokazu Seki
A little bit of a tough guy, Tenma is Akane's close friend from school. He is one of the Eight Guardians, as Seiryū of Earth (地の青龍). He cares deeply for Akane and loves her, but doesn't really show it in the beginning. As the series progresses, he begins to reveal his feelings. He has a sister named Ran, who disappeared under mysterious circumstances.
Inori (イノリ)
Voiced by: Naozumi Takahashi
A hotheaded young man whose one goal in life is to destroy demons for ruining his and his sister's lives. He is Suzaku of Heaven (天の朱雀), one of the Eight Guardians.
Shimon Nagareyama (流山詩紋, Nagareyama Shimon)
Voiced by: Kouki Miyata
One of Akane's good friends from school, Shimon is a smart, cute, and very loyal. Along with Akane and Tenma, he is transported to the Heian era. Besides confused as an oni at first, having traits such as blond hair and blue eyes, he is recognized as one of the Eight Guardians, Suzaku of Earth (地の朱雀).
Fujiwara no Takamichi (藤原鷹通)
Voiced by: Shigeru Nakahara
Hardworking, studious, and chivalrous to all women, Takamichi works in the palace archives in Kyou. He becomes one of the Eight Guardians, as Byakko of Heaven (天の白虎).
Tachibana no Tomomasa (橘友雅)
Voiced by: Kazuhiko Inoue
Tomomasa is a general in Kyou, known for being flirtatious, nonchalant, and popular with the ladies. He is one of the last to become a Guardian, as Byakko of Earth (地の白虎).
Eisen (永泉)
Voiced by: Soichiro Hoshi
Eisen is the younger brother of the current emperor of Kyou. Though he had been eligible to inherit the throne, Eisen gave up his position to become a monk. He is an accomplished musician and is a sweet, thoughtful, timid man. Eisen fell deeply in love with Akane when they first met, and is willing to sacrifice his life for her safety. He is Genbu of Heaven (天の玄武), one of the Eight Guardians.
Abe no Yasuaki (安倍泰明)
Voiced by: Akira Ishida
A cool, intense guy and one of the Eight Guardians as Genbu of Earth (地の玄武), Yasuaki is a gifted apprentice to the famous sorcerer Abe no Seimei. Despite his expressionless exterior, Yasuaki is childlike in the sense he doesn't quite understand emotions; He even shed tears with a blank face when Akane was upset with him on one occasion. He holds Akane with high regard, and develops a certain fondness for her.

=== Oni Clan ===
Akuram (アクラム)
Voiced by: Ryoutarou Okiayu
The leader of the Oni Clan, who summoned Akane to Kyou in order to utilize her power to gain full domination over the city. Akuram is said to be the most powerful of recent leaders of the Oni Clan, and his power stretches to such a level that even his close associates aren't sure how to deal with it. Akuram inherited the mask of the Oni Clan, allowing him to lead them, because he had the greatest potential to do so as a young boy. Even now he is still young despite his position. On one occasion the mask is shattered, breaking his spell and forcing him to retreat, and it seems that the mask itself is a way of focusing the magic of the Oni.
Akuram's motivation is not always clear. Sometimes it appears that he simply wants to dominate all of Kyou, however on occasion he suggests that part of his motivation is revenge for the deaths of many of his kinsfolk over the past generations of conflict between the Oni and the people of Kyou. His interest in Akane seems to be predominately a matter of obtaining power, although he often refers to her as 'his' Miko, and gets quite angry when any of his subordinates bring harm to her without his permission.
Ikutidaru (イクティダール)
Voiced by: Koji Ishii
Ikutidaru is Akuram's right hand man and probably the oldest of the surviving oni. Of all of the oni clan he has the greatest sense of conscience, and is often torn between his loyalty to his people and his love for Inori's older sister Seri. In the anime, he once disobeyed Akuram and had his eye removed as punishment for the crime (although in the manga it is not yet explained how he came to lose his eye). Despite the fact he does not always agree with the things Akuram orders, he often carries them out with resolute seriousness, even though at times it makes Kyou's predicament worse. He has a strongly protective - almost paternal - instinct where Sefuru is concerned (although Sefuru is rarely appreciative of that fact). In the manga, Ikutidaru is currently working with Akane and Yorihisa against Akuram as they try to break the curse Akuram has placed over them. His defection was inspired largely by the way in which Sefuru was injured by Akuram when he was discarded.
Shirin (シリン)
Voiced by: Maria Kawamura
The only female among the surviving members of the Oni Clan, Shirin holds a strong affection for Akuram which will allow her to do pretty much anything he tells her to do. She is very jealous of Akane because of Akuram's interest in her, and on one occasion goes behind Akuram's back and assaults the Miko because of this jealousy. Akuram seems to have no affection for her, discarding her from the clan towards the end, however in the anime conclusion Shirin offers to exchange her life for Akane's in order to be with Akuram in the afterlife. Although this ending only occurred in the anime, not in the manga. Shirin's key power is the ability to use her beauty to seduce and then manipulate the actions of men, and therefore she is angered by Takamichi who refuses to submit to her seduction spell. She and Takamichi maintain a chemistry throughout the story on account of this, with Takamichi once saving her life despite her attempts to kill him. Shirin's physical attacks often involve a rose, whose vines and thorns she can manipulate at will.
Sefuru (セフル)
Voiced by: Yuu Asakawa
Sefuru is the youngest surviving Oni, probably no more than fourteen or fifteen years old. He is technically half and half, since his mother was a normal resident of Kyou. Sefuru is bitter and hates the people of Kyou because his mother abandoned him based on his appearance when he was just a small child. It was at this time that Akuram took him in and began to train him to use him for his own purpose. For this reason, despite his half blood, Sefuru has been accepted as an Oni by the rest of the clan. However, he has a deep rooted fear of being abandoned and alone again, which often drives him to desperate acts. At one point he befriends Shimon, thinking that he's an Oni in the same situation, though he becomes indignant when he thinks that Shimon has betrayed the Oni by joining up with people in the city and is even more perturbed when he discovers that Shimon is one of the Hachiyou. Despite his aggression, however, Shimon is sure that Sefuru is more hurt than anyone by the encounter, and refuses to bear him a grudge. In the end, Sefuru is shown with Ikutidaru, Seri and their new baby, indicating that his hatred is based in his loneliness, and all he really needed was a proper place to belong. In the manga, Sefuru is discarded by Akuram and taken in while in his injured state by Inori's sister Seri on Ikutidaru's request.
Morimura Ran (森村蘭)
Voiced by: Hoko Kuwashima
Technically not a blood member of the oni clan, Ran is actually Tenma's long lost sister from modern day Kyouto. She was summoned into Kyou by Akuram some time earlier, but was too frightened to be able to connect with Ryuujin and become Ryuujin no Miko. In her despair, she reached out instead to the black dragon Kokuryuu (黒龍) and became engulfed by its power, erasing her memories of her past life and putting her under Akuram's control. Ran continues to battle with her alter-ego throughout both manga and anime, though perhaps more significantly in the manga. Probably on account of her association with the oni clan, Ran's name is also occasionally written in Katakana as 「ラン」 and features this way on the anime credits. However, in the manga it is given in kanji, as shown above.

=== Other characters ===
Fuji-hime (藤姫)
Voiced by: Ikue Otani
The descendant of the Star Clan (星の一族) who assists the Ryūjin no Miko. She looks very young, and is in fact only ten years old, but she's also very wise for her age. She is the daughter of the Minister of the Left, an important ranking figure at the imperial court, and therefore speaks very formally at all times. The 'hime' in her name indicates that she is the daughter of a wealthy and influential individual. She is the first person Akane meets when she enters Kyou, appearing as she does in the Star Clan's mansion house.
Kotengu (小天狗)
Voiced by: Junko Shimakata
Kotengu (literally, "little tengu") is the nickname given to the Tengu of Mount Funaoka (船岡山 | Funaoka-zan), one of the northern mountains around Kyou. Although originally a fearsome creature, Kotengu's power was sealed by Yasuaki and he was confined to a miniature form in which he could not do any magic (but plenty of eating and complaining). He is semi-adopted by Akane and the Hachiyou and although he is constantly threatening revenge against Yasuaki, he settles down to often run errands for the group. In the anime, Kotengu's magic is unsealed by Yasuaki to let him fight against the possessed Byakko, and though defeated, he survives the encounter and returns to his miniature form at the end of the series. In the manga, his fate is more decisive. It appears that he was killed after a similar battle with Ikutidaru, in which Eisen mistakenly prevented Kotengu from attacking the oni, therefore leaving him defenseless.
Seri (セリ)
Voiced by: Aya Hisakawa
Inori's sister, who is in love with Ikutidaru despite knowing that he is a member of the oni tribe. Seri is weak physically, but mentally very strong. It is hinted (though not openly said) at several points in the anime that Seri is pregnant with Ikutidaru's child - and at the close of the anime it is shown that they have a newborn baby. In the manga, Seri is shown as a very sympathetic person who, despite her own weak health, has been secretly nursing the injured Sefuru on Ikutidaru's request.
Kyou no Mikado (京の帝)
Eisen's older brother and the current ruler of Kyou. A well-reasoned man, the Emperor is usually calm and composed even in the face of his subjects' panic about the future of the city. Although his position means that certain formalities must be observed, the Emperor is very close to his young brother and seeks to protect him, as he feels it's somewhat his fault that Eisen has been driven to hide himself in a religious life. He is also close friends with Tomomasa as far as their difference in status allows, and occasionally they can be found sharing a joke at Eisen's expense. Though he takes an active interest in Ryuujin no Miko's progress, the Emperor is entirely detached from her activities and often wishes he could be more involved in saving his people from harm. His name is never given - and even by Eisen he is only referred to as either 'okami' (a formal manner of addressing a King) or 'aniue' (a polite term for older brother). Other cast members refer to him as 'mikado' or 'okami'.
Minamoto no Sanehisa (源実久)
Voiced by: Horiuchi Kenyuu
Yorihisa's elder brother, who is deceased by the time Akane arrives in Kyou. There is a significant age gap between Yorihisa and Sanehisa and it appears that Sanehisa was largely involved in Yorihisa's training and his upbringing. The way in which Sanehisa's role in proceedings is portrayed varies from anime to manga, although he appears in flashback quite often when a situation relates closely to Yorihisa (for example his memories of the Nue). In the anime, Yorihisa and Tenma both receive a brief dream message from Sanehisa telling them to go East to find the Eastern Seal. This is then followed by a scenario surreally sinister to the events that led up to Sanehisa's death, for which Yorihisa holds himself responsible. By defending Tenma in a similar way to how Sanehisa defended him, Yorihisa feels he has somewhat 'atoned' and can at last share the story with his companions (Akane and later Tenma). In the manga, Yorihisa is afraid to face Sanehisa and receive the dream message because he feels to blame for Sanehisa's death, which is recounted as happening the same way as the anime depicts.
Unlike Yorihisa, who is generally quite serious and focused in how he deals with situations, Sanehisa is a lot more light-hearted and is willing to tease both Akane and Yorihisa in the manga when he visits them in dreams. It is clear that he and Yorihisa shared a close bond and that he does not hold his brother responsible for his death - rather he sacrificed his life to ensure that Yorihisa survived.
Though Sanehisa's name appears briefly in the anime, it is screamed rather than spoken, thus causing it to have been mis-heard and mis-written as a result. However on both anime credits and in the manga it is written as above, with the reading as given.

== Media ==
=== Manga ===
The manga was done by Mizuno. It was serialized in LaLa DX magazine from July 1999 to January 2010, and published by Hakusensha in 17 volumes. An English version was licensed by Viz Media under the title Haruka: Beyond the Stream of Time, they released the manga via their Shojo Beat imprint.

No.	Original release date	Original ISBN	English release date	English ISBN
1	July 5, 2000	978-4592177661	April 1, 2008	978-1421517711
2	January 5, 2001	978-4592177678	June 3, 2008	978-1421517728
3	June 5, 2001	978-4592174561	November 25, 2008	978-1421520346
4	December 5, 2001	978-4592174578	May 5, 2009	978-1421520377
5	June 5, 2002	978-4592174585	October 6, 2009	978-1421524337
6	December 5, 2002	978-4592174592	January 5, 2010	978-1421527970
7	June 5, 2003	978-4592174608	April 6, 2010	978-1421527987
8	February 5, 2004	978-4592174615	June 1, 2010	978-1421527994
9	December 5, 2004	978-4592174622	August 3, 2010	978-1421528007
10	August 5, 2005	978-4592183204	November 2, 2010	978-1421533155
11	March 3, 2006	978-4592183211	February 1, 2011	978-1421533162
12	November 2, 2006	978-4592183228	May 3, 2011	978-1421533179
13	July 5, 2007	978-4592183235	August 3, 2011	978-1421533186
14	March 5, 2008	978-4592183242	November 1, 2011	978-1421533193
15	December 5, 2008	978-4592183259	February 7, 2012	978-1421533209
16	July 3, 2009	978-4592186465	May 1, 2012	978-1421535838
17	March 5, 2010	978-4592186472	August 7, 2012	978-1421541310

=== Anime ===
An anime television series titled Harukanaru Toki no Naka de ~ Hachiyou Shou~ (遙かなる時空の中で ～八葉抄～) was developed by Yumeta Company with Aki Tsunaki directing, with 26 episodes broadcast from October 5, 2004, to March 29, 2005. The twenty-six episode anime series was licensed in English by Bandai Visual and released in a series of nine DVD volumes under the title Haruka: Beyond the Stream of Time – A Tale of the Eight Guardians. A new volume was released monthly with the first volume being released April 22, 2008, and the final volume January 13, 2009. The final volume of the DVD featured omake optional endings for each of the characters. This was so that, in keeping with the game's Neoromance theme, viewers could choose for themselves which of the Hachiyou Akane liked the best. In March 2017, Tubi added the anime to their steaming service.

Two OVA episodes were released as part of the anime series. Ten - Kokoro no yukue (天 - 心の行方, Heaven – Destination of the Heart) was released on December 23, 2005, and Chi - Omoi no ariko (地 - 想いの在処, Earth - Where the Heart Lies) was released on January 27, 2006. The Ten and Chi OVAs feature the characters from the anime, but its storyline is not based on the manga.

=== Film ===
An anime feature film, titled Harukanaru Toki no Naka de - Maihitoyo (遙かなる時空の中で ～舞一夜～) was produced and released in Japan August 19, 2006.
