= Harukanaru Toki no Naka de 2 =

2001 video game

遙かなる時空の中で2
- Genre: Romance, Fantasy
- Video game
- Developer: Ruby Party
- Publisher: Koei
- Designed by: Tooko Mizuno (characters)
- Genre: Otome Adventure
- Platform: Windows, PlayStation 2, PlayStation Portable
- Released: Windows: JP: September 28, 2001; PlayStation 2: JP: February 28, 2002; PlayStation Portable: JP: June 30, 2005
- Original video animation

Harukanaru Toki no Naka de 2: Shiroki Ryuu no Miko
- Studio: Yumeta Company
- Released: March 23, 2003 – February 2, 2005
- Episodes: 3

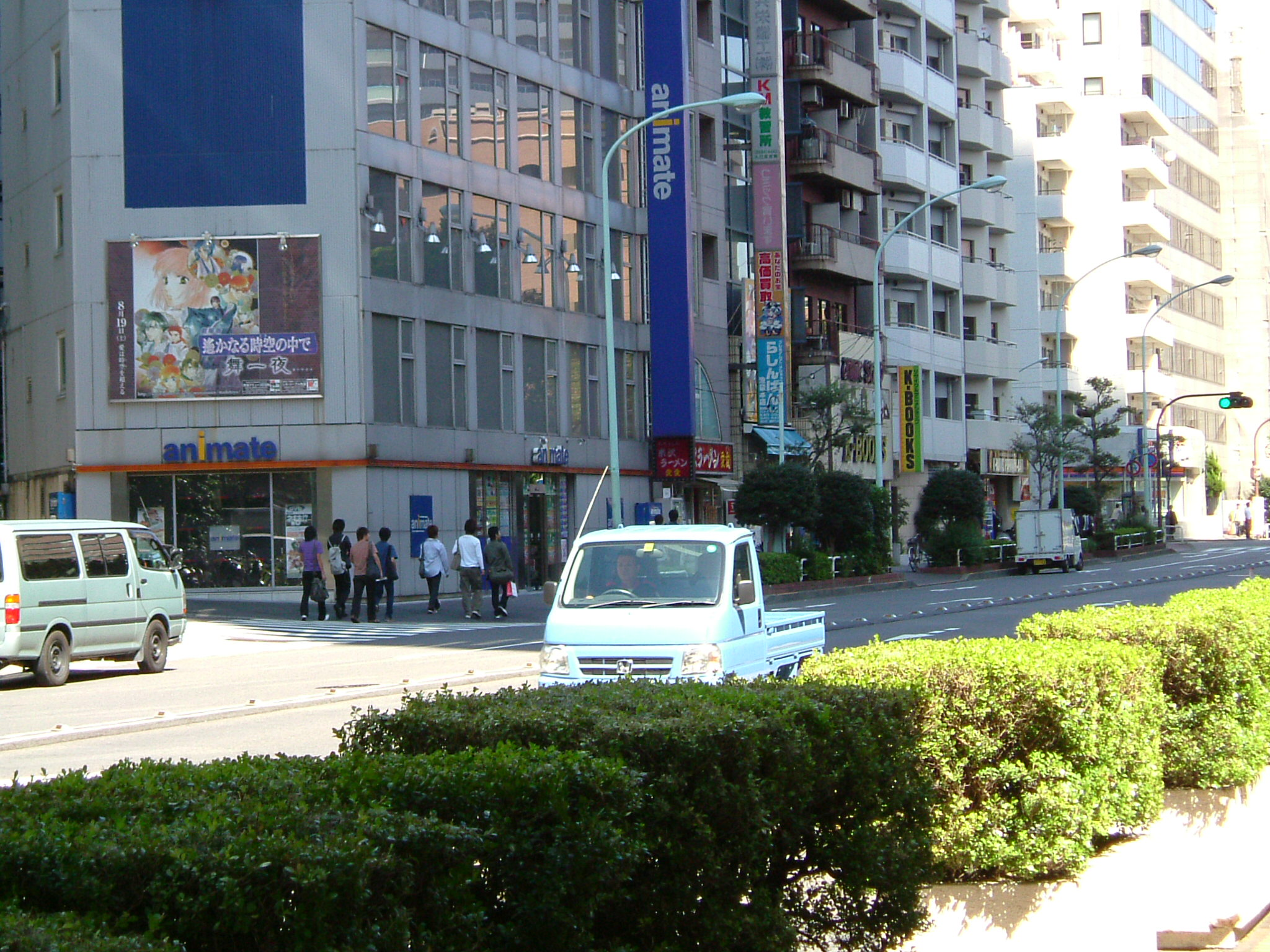
Otome Road in Ikebukuro, Tokyo, Japan

Harukanaru Toki no Naka de 2 (遙かなる時空の中で2, In a Distant Time 2) is an otome adventure game developed by Ruby Party and published by Koei. It was originally released for Windows, and has since been ported to PlayStation 2 and PlayStation Portable. Harukanaru Toki no Naka de 2 is the second installment of the Haruka series, and it is a part of Ruby Party's Neoromance label.

== Story ==
Harukanaru Toki no Naka de 2 takes place 100 years after the prior game, Harukanaru Toki no Naka de. Kyō, which resembles Kyoto in the Heian period, is in turmoil because of a power struggle going on between the emperor and the retired emperor, and the people of Kyō are falling into desperation, fearing the coming of the end of the world. Karin, a modern-day high school girl, is summoned to be the Ryūjin no Miko (龍神の神子, Priestess of the Dragon God) who will save Kyō. However, there is already a Ryūjin no Miko in Kyō who has been recognized by the retired emperor, and the eight men chosen as Karin's Hachiyō (八葉) do not believe that Karin is really the Miko.

== Characters ==
=== Main characters ===
- Karin Takakura (高倉花梨, Takakura Karin)
  - Voiced by: Tomoko Kawakami (川上とも子) (drama CDs and OVA only - Karin is unvoiced in the game)

The chosen Miko of the Ryūjin. Though Karin is known as the Hakuryū no Miko (白龍の神子, Priestess of the White Dragon), she fills the same position as the heroine of the prequel game. Though most of her character traits are determined by the player, she is generally portrayed as a straightforward, generous girl who is not overly concerned with minor details.

- Minamoto no Yoritada (源頼忠)
  - Voiced by: Shinichiro Miki (三木眞一郎)

Seiryū of Heaven (天の青龍). Yoritada is a swordsman in the retired emperor's army, the Hokumen no Bushi (北面の武士). He is calm and dependable, but he is also reticent, and has a difficult time expressing his emotions. Having decided that he need only obey the commands of his master, Yoritada avoids acting on his own will.

- Taira no Katsuzane (平勝真)
  - Voiced by: Tomokazu Seki (関智一)

Seiryū of Earth (地の青龍) and the older brother of Taira no Chitose, the other Ryūjin no Miko. A member of the Taira clan, a lesser noble family, Katsuzane works in the Imperial court. Sharp-tongued and short tempered, he is a lone wolf who avoids others. He and Isato are foster brothers, and while they were childhood friends, Katsuzane now feels indebted to Isato. Katsuzane dislikes court society, and scorns nobles who expect him to rise in rank because his sister is the Miko.

- Isato (イサト)
  - Voiced by: Naozumi Takahashi (高橋直純)

Suzaku of Heaven (天の朱雀). Isato is an apprentice sohei (warrior priest), and though neutral in the governmental power struggle, he leans toward the retired emperor. An energetic youth, he is easily angered, but has an essentially kind personality. He likes looking after others and loves children. Isato has a cold side as well, manifested in his prejudice against nobles.

- Akifumi (彰紋)
  - Voiced by: Kouki Miyata (宮田幸季)

Suzaku of Earth (地の朱雀). Akifumi is the current emperor's younger brother and the crown prince. Despite his high standing he is not at all prideful, and treats everyone he meets kindly. While on one hand he seems to be the ideal crown prince, gossip circulates in the court saying that his light-colored hair, reminiscent of the Oni Clan, makes him unsuitable. Akifumi also has a romantic side, and he lavishes praise on the main character, calling her a ten'nyo.

- Fujiwara no Yukitaka (藤原幸鷹)
  - Voiced by: Shigeru Nakahara (中原茂)

Byakko of Heaven (天の白虎). A successor of the line of Fujiwara regents, Yukitaka holds concurrent posts in the imperial court as assistant police commissioner and councillor. He sides with the retired emperor. He is dedicated to his work, serious, and has a thirst for knowledge. He strives to judge all things impartially. Though Yukitaka is generally calm and moderate in temperament, his past with Hisui can cause him to lose his cool.

- Hisui (翡翠)
  - Voiced by: Kazuhiko Inoue (井上和彦)

Byakko of Earth (地の白虎). Hisui is the chieftain of a group of pirates who headquarter in Iyo (modern Ehime Prefecture). He is neutral in the power struggle, but the emperor better serves his interests. Despite his rough profession he is a well cultivated and refined cassanova. Hisui is aloof, refuses to be tied down by any obligation, and it is difficult to predict his behavior. He will not involve himself in anything he finds uninteresting.

- Minamoto no Motomi (源泉水)
  - Voiced by: Soichiro Hoshi (保志総一朗)

Genbu of Heaven (天の玄武). Motomi is a nobleman of the Murakami branch of the Minamoto clan, and he works as a court official in the Ministry of Ceremonies. He sides with the retired emperor. A young man who deports himself with excessive modesty in order to avoid inconveniencing others, Motomi is unused to praise, and is bewildered when others do praise him. He is delicate and his feelings are easily hurt, but he longs to be of use to others.

- Abe no Yasutsugu (安倍泰継)
  - Voiced by: Akira Ishida (石田彰)

Genbu of Earth (地の玄武). Yasutsugu is an onmyōji from the same clan as Yasuaki in the prequel. He is neutral in the governmental power struggle, but favors the emperor. He is logical, and voices only facts and his true feelings, and so he tends to be perceived as being cold. Yasutsugu is a capable onmyōji, but he believes himself to be inferior to the previous Genbu of Earth, and this troubles him.

- Fujiwara no Yukari (藤原紫)
  - Voiced by: Ikue Otani (大谷育江)

A descendant of the Star Clan (星の一族), whose duty is to assist the Miko. Misono is her older twin brother. Everyone except Misono calls her Yukari-hime. She is the one person who believes that the main character is the Ryūjin no Miko from the very beginning. Yukari has a strong sense of duty and a serious personality that belies her age.

- Fujiwara no Misono (藤原深苑)
  - Voiced by: Ikue Otani (大谷育江)

Like his younger twin sister, Misono is a descendant of the Star Clan. He is very protective of Yukari. Misono possesses a maturity beyond his age, and tends to be haughty towards people of lower social standing. He has little interest in assisting the main character.

=== Secondary characters ===
- Kazuhito (和仁)
  - Voiced by: Yu Asakawa (浅川悠)

Kazuhito is a half-brother to the current emperor. He sides with the retired emperor. He is haughty and has a strong persecution complex as well as a hot temper. Kazuhito seems to act younger than his age. He believes that he was wrongly passed over for the position of Crown Prince, and hates Akifumi because of it.

- Minamoto no Tokitomo (源時朝)
  - Voiced by: Koji Ishii (石井康嗣)

Tokitomo was appointed Kazuhito's guardian by the retired emperor, and Tokitomo obeys Kazuhito's orders without question. Within his heart, he doubts that Kazuhito's ambitions are just, and his sense of duty wars with his conscience.

- Taira no Chitose (平千歳)
  - Voiced by: Hoko Kuwashima (桑島法子)

The Ryūjin no Miko whom the retired emperor acknowledges. In contrast to her ephemeral looks, she is an obstinate girl who possesses strong opinions. Chitose is the Kokuryū no Miko (黒龍の神子, Priestess of the Black Dragon) who represents the yin aspect of the Ryūjin. She is the younger sister of Taira no Katsuzane.

- Shirin (シリン)
  - Voiced by: Maria Kawamura (川村万梨阿)

A shirabyoshi dancer to whom the retired emperor has taken a fancy. While on one hand she acts on Chitose's behalf, there is inconsistency between her words and actions, as she herself denies doing so. Shirin loves Akuram, and would do anything, no matter how reprehensible, to win his affection.

- Akuram (アクラム)
  - Voiced by: Ryotaro Okiayu (置鮎龍太郎)

This mysterious man is the first person whom the main character meets upon being summoned to Kyō, and he appears before her occasionally throughout the game. Akuram is a perfectionist, and has a domineering nature. Though charismatic, he has no respect for anyone but himself.

== Reception ==
Reception

Review score
Publication	Score
Famitsu	7/10, 8/10, 8/10, 8/10

Harukanaru Toki no Naka de 2 was released for the PlayStation 2 in Japan on February 28, 2002.

== OVA ==
In 2003, a second OVA was made titled Haruka: Beyond the Stream of Time 2 ~Priestess of the White Dragon~ (遙かなる時空の中で2～白き龍の神子～, Harukanaru Toki no Naka de 2 ～Shiroki Ryū no Miko～), which covered the story line of the second video game.

== See also ==
- Harukanaru Toki no Naka de
- Harukanaru Toki no Naka de 3
- Angelique
