= Harukanaru Toki no Naka de 3 =

2004 PlayStation 2 Game

- Cover of Harukanaru Toki no Naka de 3

遙かなる時空の中で3
- Genre: Romance, Fantasy
- Video game
- Developer: Ruby Party
- Publisher: Koei
- Designed by: Tooko Mizuno (characters)
- Genre: Otome adventure
- Platform: PlayStation 2
- Released: JP: December 22, 2004
- Video game

Harukanaru Toki no Naka de 3: Izayoiki
- Developer: Ruby Party
- Publisher: Koei
- Designed by: Tooko Mizuno (characters)
- Genre: Visual novel
- Platform: PlayStation 2, PlayStation Portable
- Released: JP: September 22, 2005
- Video game

Harukanaru Toki no Naka de 3: Unmei no Labyrinth
- Developer: Ruby Party
- Publisher: Koei
- Designed by: Tooko Mizuno (characters)
- Genre: Visual novel
- Platform: PlayStation 2, PlayStation Portable
- Released: JP: March 23, 2006
- Video game

Harukanaru Toki no Naka de 3 Ultimate
- Developer: Ruby Party
- Publisher: Koei Tecmo Games
- Designed by: Tooko Mizuno (characters)
- Genre: Visual novel
- Platform: PlayStation Vita
- Released: JP: March 23, 2017
- Original video animation

Harukanaru Toki no Naka de 3 ~Kurenai no Tsuki~
- Directed by: Toshiya Shinohara
- Studio: Yumeta Company
- Released: December 28, 2007
- Runtime: 59 minutes + 7 minute Onsen Chibi Special
- Original video animation

Harukanaru Toki no Naka de 3 ~Owari Naki Unmei~
- Directed by: Shigeru Kimiya
- Music by: Yoshihisa Hirano
- Studio: Yumeta Company
- Released: January 3, 2010
- Runtime: 56 minutes

Harukanaru Toki no Naka de 3 (遙かなる時空の中で3; In a Distant Time 3) is a PlayStation 2 otome adventure game developed by Ruby Party and published by Koei. Haruka Toki no Naka de 3 is the third installment in the Harukanaru Toki no Naka de series.

The storyline takes place 100 years after the events in Harukanaru Toki no Naka de 2, and is a part of Ruby Party's Neo Romance label, the Second series.

== Story ==
The story occurs 100 years after Harukanaru Toki no Naka de 2.

On a rainy day, Nozomi Kasuga and her two friends encounter a strange boy at their high school who sends them hurtling across time and space to a place in another world called Kyō. This place bears a strong resemblance to Kyoto at the end of the Heian period, where the Minamoto clan (Genji), led by Minamoto no Yoritomo (based on the historical Minamoto no Yoritomo), is at war with the Taira clan (Heike), led by Taira no Kiyomori (based on the historical Taira no Kiyomori). The Heike hope to defeat the Genji by releasing vengeful spirits (onryō) to disturb the Earth's natural flow of energies and to terrorize the land. The boy that Nozomi met is revealed to be the human form of Hakuryū, the White Dragon God said to protect Kyō, whose powers have greatly weakened due to the presence of the onryō. Nozomi discovers that she has the power to seal the onryō as Hakuryū no Miko (白龍の神子, Priestess of the White Dragon). She allies herself with the Genji in order to seal the onryō, restore Hakuryū's powers, and return home to her own world.

== Characters ==
=== Main characters ===
Nozomi Kasuga (春日望美, Kasuga Nozomi)
Voiced by: Tomoko Kawakami (川上とも子, Kawakami Tomoko)
The main character. A girl in her second year of high school. Chosen by the god called Hakuryū (White Dragon) to be his priestess, she is brought to a strange world where the Genji and the Heike wage war with one another. In order to return home, she must fight alongside the Genji against the Heike. Having obtained the power to cross time, she is determined to save those friends she loses in battle. She grew up with the Arikawa brothers, and until recently the three of them have virtually always been together. In the anime, she harbours feelings for Masaomi.
Masaomi Arikawa (有川将臣, Arikawa Masaomi)
Voiced by: Shin-ichiro Miki (三木眞一郎, Miki Shin'ichirō)
Ten no Seiryū (天の青龍, Seiryū of Heaven). Nozomi's childhood friend and classmate, and Yuzuru's older brother. A charismatically bold and reliable young man. He is separated from Nozomi and Yuzuru when they are sent across time and space, and the only contact Nozomi has with him is through her dreams. When they finally meet again, Nozomi discovers that Masaomi arrived in this new world three years before them. Unknown to Nozomi and most of the other (Genji-allied) Hachiyō, he is actually in league with the Heike clan and is better known as the fearsome general Kaeri naifu (還内府). Masaomi and Nozomi have mutual feelings for one another, though they do not show it. Masaomi cares about Nozomi, when he gives her a gift (a musical antique watch) because she likes it, when they were in the human world.
Minamoto no Kurō Yoshitsune (源九郎義経)
Voiced by: Tomokazu Seki (関智一, Seki Tomokazu)
Chi no Seiryū (地の青龍, Seiryū of Earth). A general of the Genji army. Called "Kurō" (rather than "Yoshitsune"). He initially opposes Nozomi's wish to fight, believing that women should not be exposed to the dangers of the battlefield, but readily accepts her when she proves herself in battle. He is easily misjudged due to his blunt way of speaking, but, in reality, he takes very good care of his men and of other people. Kurō is an extremely hard worker, and because he deeply esteems his older brother, Minamoto no Yoritomo, he strives wholeheartedly to do everything he can for the Genji clan. In the anime, he loves Nozomi. He is based on the historical Minamoto no Yoshitsune.
Hinoe (ヒノエ)
Voiced by: Naozumi Takahashi (高橋直純, Takahashi Naozumi)
Ten no Suzaku (天の朱雀, Suzaku of Heaven). A mysterious young man who appears without reason during Nozomi's stay in Kumano. He seems to be a part of the Kumano navy. He is bright, fearless, and easygoing. Though he is young, no matter what the situation he always has levelheadedness to spare. Hinoe likes to flirt with girls, and upon learning that Nozomi is Miko, he seems to take an interest in her and goes out of his way to see her. His real name is Fujiwara no Tanzou, and he is the Kumano Bettou in charge of the Kumano Navy.
Musashibō Benkei (武蔵坊弁慶)
Voiced by: Kōki Miyata (宮田幸季, Miyata Kōki)
Chi no Suzaku (地の朱雀, Suzaku of Earth). Kurō is a confidant and military tactician who is well informed in many areas of knowledge. He is a seemingly calm-mannered young man. Originally a fighting monk from Mt. Hiei, he left the temple to be an herbalist. He helps the confused protagonist upon her arrival in the strange world. Benkei has sociable manners, but cannot help but to tease girls like Nozomi. He is based on the historical Musashibō Benkei.
Yuzuru Arikawa (有川譲, Arikawa Yuzuru)
Voiced by: Shigeru Nakahara (中原茂, Nakahara Shigeru)
Ten no Byakko (天の白虎, Byakko of Heaven). Nozomi's childhood friend and one year her junior. He is the younger brother of Masaomi, the Ten no Seiryū. Though only a first-year in high school, he is very mature. He is a perfectly behaved honors student who likes archery. Yuzuru suffers from unrequited love for Nozomi and is unable to tell her his feelings. He worries and fusses a lot, but he has a soft spot for her.
Kajiwara Kagetoki (梶原景時)
Voiced by: Kazuhiko Inoue (井上和彦, Inoue Kazuhiko)
Chi no Byakko (地の白虎, Byakko of Earth). The showy and frivolous army magistrate and a military commander of the Genji. He is the confidant of Kurō's older brother, Minamoto no Yoritomo. Although a soldier, Kagetoki also uses a gun-like tool to effect Onmyōji arts. He appears to be showing off, but he is careful and attentive to people's relationships. He is the thoughtful and protective older brother of Kajiwara Saku, the Kokuryū no Miko (黒龍の神子, Priestess of the Black Dragon). He is based on the historical Kajiwara Kagetoki.
Taira no Atsumori (平敦盛)
Voiced by: Sōichirō Hoshi (保志総一朗, Hoshi Sōichirō)
Ten no Genbu (天の玄武, Genbu of Heaven). A young nobleman of the enemy Heike clan. Nozomi finds him collapsed from his wounds on the battlefield and takes him in. A young man of few words, he refrains from associating much with other people. Atsumori joins Nozomi for the sake of helping purify and absolve the suffering onryō, but having to fight against his own clan pains him greatly. He is skilled at the flute. He is based on the historical Taira no Atsumori.
Ridvan (リズヴァーン)
Voiced by: Akira Ishida (石田彰, Ishida Akira)
Chi no Genbu (地の玄武, Genbu of Earth). Nozomi and Kurō's sword instructor. Sometimes called a tengu of Mt. Kurama. He gives off a silent, dark, cold impression, but he is in fact very gentle and kind. Because he is a descendant of the Oni Clan, the same clan that long ago plagued Heian Kyō with crises, he possesses special powers, such as the ability to teleport. He watches over Nozomi, and guides her in ways that are at times gentle and at others, harsh. Nozomi and Kurō call him "Sensei", and Saku and the other Hachiyou affectionately call him "Rid-sensei". Ridvan's character is loosely based on the tengu that folktales say taught Minamoto no Yoshitsune his swordsmanship.
Kajiwara Saku (梶原朔)
Voiced by: Hoko Kuwashima (桑島法子)
Younger sister of Kagetoki and only a year older than Nozomi, yet very mature. She is the Kokuryū no Miko (黒龍の神子, Priestess of the Black Dragon). She is romantically involved with Kokuryū until the day he mysteriously disappears. She is very fond of Nozomi, whom she calls her 'twin'. She is an excellent dancer and later imparts her knowledge in that area to Nozomi, giving her a fan to practice her performance.
Hakuryū (白龍)
Voiced by: Ryōtarō Okiayu (置鮎龍太郎) (adult form), Ikue Ōtani (大谷育江) (child form)
The Ryūjin who summoned Nozomi and the Arikawa brothers through time and space to a foreign world. Having lost all his powers, he first appeared in the form of a child when Nozomi met him. He deeply trusts Nozomi and is saddened by his powerlessness. Gradually as he gains more power, he takes the form of an adult (surprising Nozomi and the others) but he still retains his child-like innocence.

=== Genji Clan ===
Minamoto no Yoritomo (源 頼朝)
Voiced by: Koji Ishii (石井康嗣)
Leader of the Genji clan, older brother of Minamoto no Kurou Yoshitsune, the Chi no Seiryuu, and master of Kajiwara Kagetoki, the Chi no Byakko. He holds the title Kamakura-dono. He is a cool-headed and severe man who wields great political and military power. He is based on the historical Minamoto no Yoritomo.
Hojo Masako (北条 政子)
Voiced by: Maria Kawamura (川村万梨阿)
Wife of Minamoto no Yoritomo. She deeply adores Yoritomo and as his proxy does everything in her power to support him. While she appears gentle and kind, always speaking sweetly and respectfully, she actually hides a more sinister power. She is based on the historical Hojo Masako.

=== Heike Clan ===
Taira no Tomomori (平 知盛)
Voiced by: Kenji Hamada (浜田 賢二)
A commander of the Heike clan who exhibits little concern towards conventional moral guidelines. While educated and cultured, he loves the exhilaration of battle and is fiercely attracted to Nozomi's swordsmanship skills and determination. He is the son of Taira no Kiyomori. He is based on the historical Taira no Tomomori.
Taira no Tsunemasa (平 経正)
Voiced by: Eiji Hanawa (花輪 英司)
A commander of the Heike clan and the beloved older brother of Taira no Atsumori, the Ten no Genbu. Tsunemasa carries an air of nobility and believes in avoiding fighting when possible. He is gentle and refined and is a gifted biwa player. A man with a soft external appearance, he is also a close aide of Kaerinaifu. He is based on the historical Taira no Tsunemasa.
Taira no Koremori (平 維盛)
Voiced by: Yuki Matsuda (松田 佑貴)
Also a Heike commander. He has a pretty face and carries himself elegantly, unlike the wild Tomomori. He believes that destruction and chaos are beautiful, and has no hesitation in using cruelty in his methods. He is based on the historical Taira no Koremori.
Taira no Kiyomori (平 清盛)
Voiced by: Yuu Asakawa (浅川悠)
Leader of the Heike clan and father of Taira no Tomomori. He had died as an old man but was revived as an onryou in the form of a boy. He took in a lost and starving 17-year-old Masaomi because he resembled his late beloved son, Taira no Shigemori. He is based on the historical Taira no Kiyomori.

=== Others ===
Shirogane (銀)
Voiced by: Kenji Hamada (浜田 賢二)
A character that first appeared in the Izayoiki fan disc. An elegant and refined young man with no memories of his past, Shirogane is the loyal retainer of Fujiwara no Yasuhira and serves Nozomi thoughtfully and faithfully according to his orders. A mysterious warrior with a striking physical resemblance to Taira no Tomomori. He is eventually discovered to be Taira no Shigehira, Tomomori's younger brother and son of Taira no Kiyomori. He is based on the historical Taira no Shigehira.
Fujiwara no Yasuhira (藤原泰衡)
Voiced by: Kōsuke Toriumi (鳥海浩輔)
Also, a character that first appeared in the Izayoiki fan disc. Shirogane's master, the eldest son of the leader of Hiraizumi, Fujiwara no Hidehira, and an old acquaintance of Kurou, who had lived in Hiraizumi under Hidehira's care as a youth. Discerning, rational, and clever, Yasuhira treats Nozomi, the Hakuryū no Miko, with courtesy, but there are times when a cruel smile surfaces. He manages Hiraizumi's military forces and has a deep knowledge of sorcery and onmyōji arts. He is based on the historical Fujiwara no Yasuhira.

== Titles ==
- Harukanaru Toki no Naka de 3. (Main Game). Released on December 22, 2004, for PlayStation 2.
- Harukanaru Toki no Naka de 3, Izayoi-ki (十六夜記). Released on September 22, 2005, for PS2.
- Harukanaru Toki no Naka de 3, Unmei no Meikyū (Labirinth) (運命の迷宮). Released on March 23, 2006, for PS2.
- Harukanaru Toki no Naka de 3 with Izayoi-ki, Aizōban. Released on March 19, 2009, for PlayStation Portable.
- Harukanaru Toki no Naka de 3, Unmei no Meikyū, Aizōban. Released on March 23, 2006, for PSP.
- Harukanaru Toki no Naka de 3, Ultimate. Released on March 23, 2006, for PlayStation Vita. Full voiced version.

== TV Anime ==
- Kurenai no Tsuki (紅の月, The Moon of Scarlet). Broadcast in Kids-station on 28 December 2007.
  - Opening theme: Unmei no Tsuki wa Kurenai (運命の月は紅)
  - Ending theme: Gyakufū no Toki ni Hitori (逆風の時空にひとり)
- Owarinaki Unmei (終わりなき運命, The Endless Fate). Broadcast in AT-X on 3 January 2010.
  - Opening theme: Kirameki no Tsuki (煌めきの月)
  - Ending theme: Yūkyū no Gekkō (悠久の月光)
  - Inserted song: Dakuryū no Hotori, Seiryū no Fuchi (濁流のほとり 清流の淵)

== CDs ==
- BGM collection:
  - Harukanaru Toki no Naka de 3 - Original Soundtrack
- Drama CD:
  - Harukanaru Toki no Naka de 3 - Usudukiyo 1 ~ Reimei no shō ~
  - Harukanaru Toki no Naka de 3 - Usudukiyo 2 ~ Tasogare no shō ~
- Vocal variety CD:
  - Harukanaru Toki no Naka de 3 - Ariake no Uta
  - Harukanaru Toki no Naka de 3 - Izayoi-ki, Tsuki no Shizuku
  - Harukanaru Toki no Naka de 3 - Hanaduki no Yoi
  - Harukanaru Toki no Naka de 3 - Yukimachi-duki
  - Harukanaru Toki no Naka de 3 - Oborodukiyo
  - Harukanaru Toki no Naka de 3 Kurenai no Tsuki - Dai-1-ya
  - Harukanaru Toki no Naka de 3 Kurenai no Tsuki - Dai-2-ya
  - Harukanaru Toki no Naka de 3 Kurenai no Tsuki - Vocal Collection
  - Harukanaru Toki no Naka de 3 with Izayoi-ki Aizō-ban ~ Shinonome duki
  - Harukanaru Toki no Naka de 3 ~ Owarinaki Unmei ~ Vocal Collection, Eiketsu no Sakuraduki
