= Kōki Miyata =

Japanese voice actor (born 1972)

Koki Miyata
- 宮田 幸季
- Born: October 9, 1972 (age 53); Yokohama, Kanagawa Prefecture, Japan
- Other name: Harunori Miyata (宮田 始典)
- Occupation: Voice actor
- Years active: 1993–present
- Agent: 81 Produce
- Height: 165 cm (5 ft 5 in)

Kōki Miyata (宮田 幸季, Miyata Kōki; born October 9, 1972 in Yokohama) is a Japanese voice actor who works for 81 Produce. He was formerly credited as Harunori Miyata (宮田 始典, Miyata Harunori). He made his radio CM narration debut on 2 March 1993.

== Filmography ==
=== Anime ===
- Nintama Rantarou (1993), Kanzaki Samon
- Trigun (1998), young Vash the Stampede
- Neo Ranga (1998), Joel
- Bubblegum Crisis Tokyo 2040 (1998), Mackey Stingray
- Digimon Adventure (1999), PicoDevimon
- Hoshin Engi (1999), Nataku
- Magic User's Club (1999), Naoki Nakatomi
- Hamtaro (2000), Torahamu
- Gravitation (2000), Eiri Yuki (child)
- Super GALS! Kotobuki Ran (2001), Masato Iwai
- PaRappa the Rapper (2001), Prince Rotin
- Shaman King (2001), Ashil
- Angel Tales (2001), Rei
- RahXephon (2002), Souichi Yagumo
- GetBackers (2002), Jouya Kanou
- Bakuten Shoot Beyblade G-Revolution (2003), Mystel
- Wandaba Style (2003), Dr. Susumu Tsukumo
- Saint Beast (2003–2007), Suzaku no Rei
- Gilgamesh (2003), Toru Tsukioka
- Kyo Kara Maoh! (2004), Ken Murata
- Harukanaru Toki no Naka de Hachiyō Shō (2004), Shimon Nagareyama
- Tactics (2004), Kantarou Ichinomiya
- Bleach (2005), Hanatarō Yamada
- Suki na Mono wa Suki Dakara Shōganai! (2005), Sei Hashiba
- Emma (2005, 2007), Arthur Jones
- Tsubasa: Reservoir Chronicle (2005), Yukito Tsukishiro
- Noein (2005), Isami Fujiwara
- Doraemon (2005), Goro
- Karin (2005), Winner Sinclair
- Major (2005), Daisuke Komori – second season
- Marginal Prince (2006), Mikhail Nevsky
- Kenichi: The Mightiest Disciple (2006), Ryōto Asamiya (child)
- Naruto Shippuden (2007), Chōjūrō
- Bokurano (2007), Kunihiko Moji
- Goshūshō-sama Ninomiya-kun (2007), Mitsuru Hosaka
- Shugo Chara! (2008–2009), Rhythm – seasons two and three
- 07-Ghost (2009), Labrador
- Inuyasha: The Final Act (2009), Spirit of Mount Azusa
- Baka to Test to Shōkanjū (2010–2011), Kōta Tsuchiya
- Kami-sama no Memo-chō (2011), Hitoshi Mukai "Shōsa"
- Phi Brain: Puzzle of God (2011), Cubic Galois
- Beyblade: Metal Masters (2011), Toby / Faust
- One Piece (2011), Wadatsumi, Dellinger
- Shirokuma Cafe (2012), Badger, Red Squirrel Mama, Sea Otter
- Kingdom (2012), Chengjiao
- Magi: The Labyrinth of Magic (2012), Ahbmad Saluja
- Amnesia (2013), Ukyo
- Free! (2013–2014), Aiichiro Nitori
- Danganronpa: The Animation (2013), Chihiro Fujisaki, Alter Ego
- Meganebu! (2013), Mitsuki Kamatani
- Yowamushi Pedal (2013), Terufumi Sugimoto
- D-Frag! (2014), Hachi Shiō
- Nameko: Sekai no Tomodachi (2016), Robo-Nameko
- 100% Pascal-sensei (2017), Kawai (ep. 28)
- Boogiepop and Others (2019), Echoes
- Demon Slayer: Kimetsu no Yaiba (2019), Murata
- Star Twinkle PreCure (2019), Oliphio
- In/Spectre (2020), Nushi no Orochi
- Chainsaw Man (2022), Zombie Devil
- Digimon Tamers (????), Kumbhiramon
- Doraemon (????), Tora Arthur

=== Original video animation (OVA) ===
- Chocolat no Mahō – Cacao
- Air Gear: Kuro no Hane to Nemuri no Mori – Kilik
- Angel Tales: Tenshi no Shippo Chu! – Rei
- Angel's Feather – Anri Chikura
- Baka to Test to Shōkanjū: Matsuri – Kōta Tsuchiya
- Detective Conan: The Miracle of Excalibur – Akira
- Harukanaru Toki no Naka de~Ajisai Yume Gatari~ – Shimon Nagareyama
- Harukanaru Toki no Naka de2~Shiroki, Ryuu no Miko~ – Akifumi
- Harukanaru Toki no Naka de3~Kurenai no Tsuki – Musashibo Benkei
- Koisuru Boukun – Tomoe Tatsumi
- Saint Beast – Suzaku no Rei
- Suki na Mono wa Suki Dakara Shōganai! – Sei Hashiba
- Kirepapa – Riju

=== Films ===
- Haruka: Beyond the Stream of Time (2006), Shimon Nagareyama
- Bleach: Fade to Black (2008), Hanatarō Yamada
- Detective Conan: Quarter of Silence (2011), Tōma Tachihara
- Heart no Kuni no Alice (2011), Peter White
- Fairy Tail the Movie: Phoenix Priestess (2012), Duke Cream
- Boruto: Naruto the Movie (2015), Chōjūrō
- Free!: Timeless Medley (2017), Aiichirō Nitori – dilogy

=== Video games ===
- Alice in the Country of Hearts – Peter White
- Amnesia – Ukyo
- Amnesia Later – Ukyo
- Amnesia Crowd – Ukyo
- Blue Dragon – Jiro
- Crash Bandicoot: Bakuso! Nitro Kart – Real Velo
- Danganronpa: Trigger Happy Havoc – Chihiro Fujisaki, Alter Ego
- Glass Heart Princess – Hoshino Kanata
- Fushigi Yūgi: Suzaku Ibun – Chichiri
- Harukanaru Toki no Naka de – Shimon Nagareyama
- Harukanaru Toki no Naka de 2 – Akifumi
- Harukanaru Toki no Naka de 3 – Musashibō Benkei
- Harukanaru Toki no Naka de 4 – Nagi
- Magical Drop F – Magician
- Reijou Tantei Office no Jikenbo - Koji
- Silver Chaos – Pam
- Suto*Mani: Strobe*Mania - Keigo Kisaragi
- S.Y.K – Gyokuryuu
- The Saint of Braves Baan Gaan – Hiro Sakashita in Brave Saga
- Seishun Hajimemashita! – Ichitaka Enmei
- Touken Ranbu – Hōchō Tōshirō
- Danganronpa Another Episode: Ultra Despair Girls – Taichi Fujisaki
- Piyo tan ~Hausukīpā wa Cute na Tantei~ – Toru Ninomiya
- Piyo tan ~Oyashiki Sen'nyū ☆ Daisakusen~ – Toru Ninomiya
- Nightshade – Ieyasu Tokugawa
- Bleach Rebirth of Souls: Hanataro Yamada

=== Drama CDs ===
- Ai de Kitsuku Shibaritai ~Koi Yori Hageshiku~ – Kajika Fujimoto
- Amai Kuchizuke – Yuu Takamura
- Bad Boys! – Itsumu Suzuna
- Blue na Koneko – Kouhei Kuzumu
- Bukiyou na Silent – Satoru Toono
- Crimson Spell – Ruruka
- Damasaretai – Yuuma Matsusaki
- Danna-sama, Ote wo Douzo – Haruka Fujino
- Gouka Kyakusen de Koi wa Hajimaru series 4, 5, 7, 8 – Huang
- Himitsu no Kateikyoushi – Yuuya Sakurai
- Hisoyaka na Jounetsu Series side story 1: Iro no Aku – Shiki Nihako
- Kageki series 5: Kageki ni Tengoku – angel 1
- Kubisuji ni Kiss ~Hong Kong Yakyoku~ – Ryuutarou Imai
- Miwaku no Ringo – Yonekura Ken
- Munasawagi series – Akira Haneoka
- Niehime to Kemono no Ō - Set
- Pink na Koneko – Kouhei Kuzumu
- Saikyou no Koibito – Chihiro Kunika
- Tsuki no Sabaku Satsujin Jiken – Suzuya Takanashi
- Yosei Gakuen Feararuka -Futago no Sylph ni Goyojin- – Nyiru
- Youma na Oresama to Geboku na Boku – Masamichi Adachi
- Yuuwaku Sentiment – Yuuya
- Piyo tan ~Hausukīpā wa Cute na Tantei~ - Toru Ninomiya

=== Tokusatsu ===
- Bakuryuu Sentai Abaranger – Blastasaur Triceratops
- Bakuryū Sentai Abaranger DELUXE: Abare Summer is Freezing Cold! – Burstosaur Triceratops
- Bakuryū Sentai Abaranger vs. Hurricaneger – Burstosaur Triceratops
- Tokusou Sentai Dekaranger vs. Abaranger – Burstosaur Triceratops
- Tensou Sentai Goseiger – Datas (eps. 4 - 50)/Datas Hyper/Mystic Datas Hyper
- Kamen Rider Decade – Basshaa (ep. 4 - 5)
- Zyuden Sentai Kyoryuger – Debo Akkumuun (ep. 25, 37)

=== Dubbing ===
==== Live-action ====
- Boy Meets World – Stuart Minkus
- The Hobbit film series – Ori
- Horse Sense – Tommy Biggs
- Jumping Ship – Tommy Biggs
- The Nephew – Peter O'Boyce
- Now You See It... – Cedric
- Sam & Cat – Dice
- Sleepy Hollow – Young Masbath
- Small Soldiers – Alan Abernathy
- Spy Kids 3-D: Game Over – Francis
- Taken – Jacob Clarke (child)
- Twas the Night – Danny Wrigley
- The Virgin Suicides – Chase Buell

==== Animation ====
- The Batman – Prank
- Bob the Builder – Travis
- The Care Bears' Big Wish Movie – Grumpy Bear
- Care Bears: Journey to Joke-a-lot – Grumpy Bear
- Care Bears: Oopsy Does It! – Grumpy Bear
- Corpse Bride – General Bonesapart
- Exchange Student Zero – Max Cameron
- Garfield's Pet Force – Nermal
- Legend of the Guardians: The Owls of Ga'Hoole – Digger
- The Patrick Star Show – SpongeBob
- Pet Alien – Tommy Cadle
- Phineas and Ferb – Phineas Flynn
- Phineas and Ferb the Movie: Across the 2nd Dimension – Phineas Flynn, Phineas-2
- Phineas and Ferb the Movie: Candace Against the Universe - Phineas Flynn
- Plankton: The Movie – SpongeBob
- Romeo & Juliet: Sealed with a Kiss – Romeo
- Spider-Man – Randy Robertson
- Teen Titans – Beast Boy
- Teen Titans Go! - Beast Boy
- Thomas & Friends: All Engines Go - Skiff
- Watership Down – Fiver
- Young Justice – Beast Boy
- The SpongeBob Movie: Search for SquarePants – SpongeBob
- SpongeBob SquarePants – SpongeBob (Replacing the late Taiki Matsuno)
