= Buddy Mission Bond =

- Japanese cover art
- Developer: Ruby Party
- Publisher: Nintendo
- Directors: Tomoko Nakayama; Jun Miyauchi
- Artist: Yusuke Murata
- Composer: Kosuke Mizukami
- Platform: Nintendo Switch
- Release: JP: January 29, 2021; KR: August 20, 2021; TW: August 20, 2021
- Genres: Adventure, Visual novel
- Mode: Single-player

Buddy Mission Bond is a 2021 adventure video game developed by Ruby Party and published by Nintendo for the Nintendo Switch. The game was revealed at a Nintendo Direct Mini: Partner Showcase on October 28 and released on January 29, 2021 in Japan and August 20, 2021 in Korea and Taiwan.

== Gameplay ==
Buddy Mission Bond is a visual novel adventure game split up into several missions. Gameplay is split up into two different parts. The first part requires the player to choose two of the four main characters to form a pair of buddies that look for clues and interview citizens in a visual novel format. The second part sees the buddies infiltrate a villain's base in a traditional third-person view.

The infiltration route taken by the player depends on specific clues found in the first phase. Throughout each mission, a "Hero Gauge" is present, which acts as a score mechanism that increases or decreases based on dialogue choices, investigation methods, and infiltration methods used at the end of a mission. The overall score is displayed as a rank after each mission.

== Story ==
Buddy Mission Bond takes place on Mikagura Island, the international center for show business. The protagonist Luke Williams is a police officer who dreams of becoming a hero who and emulating his late father, a policeman who died in the line of duty. One day, the police station Luke works at is sent a video showing the kidnapping of a woman. Disobeying his superior's orders to not investigate, Luke tracks down and infiltrates the kidnapper's hideout. However, he runs into "Phantom Thief Beast" Aaron, a man who is alleged to have caused several hundred billion dollars' worth of public property damage.

The two team up to track down the kidnappers. Eventually they learn of the existence of a secret criminal syndicate “DISCARD” that operates from the shadows. To stop DISCARD, Luke and Aaron team up with the ninja Mokuma and conman Chesley in order to create the undercover investigation team called "BOND". Along the way, Luke slowly starts to uncover the truth behind his father's death.

== Development ==
During the development of the Nintendo Switch, seeking new avenues and genres to attract people to the platform, Nintendo approached Ruby Party to develop an otome game for the platform. Ruby Party, who at the time had no experience with home console development, pitched a romance game, which Nintendo greenlit around 2016. However, during the development of the title, the project's scale grew from a romance title, to one focusing on multiple, different kinds of bonds.

According to Mei Erikawa of Ruby Party, doing BMB was a challenge since most of the staff did not have experience in creating a game that can cater to male gamers. She also mentioned that most of the staff previously worked on Touken Ranbu Warriors.

On January 29, 2021, the game's official Twitter account went online.

Character designs were illustrated by Yusuke Murata.

== Reception ==
The game received fairly positive reviews from critics. Famitsu remarked that there was "a good balance between the ADV parts and the Action parts. They're both high quality."

Reception

Review score
Publication	Score
Famitsu	34/40
