= Haruka: Beyond the Stream of Time =

2000 video game

- Cover art from the Harukanaru Toki no Naka de PlayStation video game

遙かなる時空の中で (Haruka Naru Toki no Naka de)
- Genre: Romance, fantasy
- Video game
- Developer: Ruby Party
- Publisher: Koei (PS)
- Genre: Visual novel
- Platform: PlayStation, PlayStation 2
- Released: April 6, 2000 (PS)
- Original video animation

Haruka: Beyond the Stream of Time ~Ajisai Yumegatari~
- Directed by: Iku Suzuki
- Studio: Zexcs
- Released: March 27, 2002 – January 22, 2003
- Episodes: 2
- Other
- Haruka: Beyond the Stream of Time (manga, anime, and film); List of Haruka video games; Other Haruka video games

Harukanaru Toki no Naka de (遙かなる時空(とき)の中で; lit. 'Within the Expanse of a Distant Time') is an otome adventure game developed by Ruby Party and published by Koei. It is a part of Ruby Party's Neoromance label.

Because of Harukanaru Toki no Naka de's success, the game has given rise to a franchise including several sequels, numerous drama and music CDs, a manga series, two OAVs, a movie, and an anime television series, and a live-action theatrical.

== Plot ==
On the first day of a new school term, high school student Akane Motomiya, her classmate Tenma Morimura, and their underclass friend Shimon Nagareyama are sucked into a mysterious old well. When they awake, they are in Kyō (京), another world that resembles Kyoto during the Heian Period. According to the young scion of the Star Clan (星の一族), Fujihime, Akane is the Ryūjin no Miko (龍神の神子, Priestess of the Dragon God) who has come to save Kyō from the ambitions of the Oni Clan (鬼の一族). In this task, Akane has the help of eight beautiful and single men known as the Hachiyō (八葉), and her friends Tenma and Shimon number among them. Initially, Akane is bewildered by her new circumstances, but she gradually comes to face up to her own destiny and understand the world of Kyō.

== Gameplay ==
Harukanaru Toki no Naka de places the player in the role of a girl who is surrounded by attractive young men, and gives her the option of trying to win the heart of one and live happily ever after. The heroine must also fight evil with the help of the attractive young men. The result is a hybrid game with a visual novel–like interaction mode, a simple role-playing video game battle mode, and a board game–like map.

Haruka is made up of ten chapters, eight of which involve the core gameplay. These chapters take place over a two-week period and involve traveling around the Kyō map, searching for various key items. Kyō is made up of roughly 20 areas and it is possible to visit three in one day. However, most areas are possessed by onryō (怨霊) vengeful ghosts that must be dispelled before you can enter, and fighting them consumes one of the three visit chances.

Haruka's battle system is limited in comparison to most CRPGs of its day. The maximum party size is 3 characters, but only Akane is under the direct control of the player. Though Akane can attack and defend, her other abilities – the use of healing items and spells, and the ability to encourage her comrades, are more useful. There is no magic point system as such. Casting spells is based on the morale of the Hachiyō members and the number of elemental fuda (札) cards Akane has. Furthermore, there is no experience system and the character's hit points are refilled automatically between fights. The main reward for fighting, besides gaining entrance to a given area, is the chance to gain the trust of Hachiyō. The greater a Hachiyō member's rapport with Akane, the more effective he will be in battle.

== Characters ==
=== Main characters ===
- Akane Motomiya (元宮あかね, Motomiya Akane)
  - Voiced by: Tomoko Kawakami (川上とも子)

The main protagonist, she is a cheerful, forthright high school freshman. This character's default name is Akane, but the player can pick other names for her. Akane is summoned into the world of Kyō and becomes the Ryūjin no Miko (龍神の神子, Priestess of the Dragon God). She is the only person capable of communicating with the Ryūjin, and with the help of the Hachiyō, she can use the powers of the five elements to defeat the onryō that the Oni Clan has unleashed throughout Kyō.

- Minamoto no Yorihisa (源頼久)
  - Voiced by: Shinichiro Miki (三木眞一郎)

One of the Hachiyō, he is the Seiryū of Heaven (天の青龍). Yorihisa is a samurai in the service of the Imperial court. Serious and disciplined, he swears fealty to Akane as his master, and he always obeys Akane's commands. His elemental attribute is Wind, and his dragon jewel is located on his left ear.

- Tenma Morimura (森村天真, Morimura Tenma)
  - Voiced by: Tomokazu Seki (関智一)

One of the Hachiyō, he is the Seiryū of Earth (地の青龍). Tenma is Akane's classmate and friend, who is pulled into Kyō with her. He has little concern for formality and can be abrasive, but he has a strong sense of responsibility to others. Tenma's younger sister has been missing for some time. His elemental attribute is Thunder, and his dragon jewel is located on his left arm.

- Inori (イノリ)
  - Voiced by: Naozumi Takahashi (高橋直純)

One of the Hachiyō, he is the Suzaku of Heaven (天の朱雀). Inori is a blacksmith's apprentice. He has a fierce hatred of Oni. Though he can be hot-headed, Inori has an open, honest personality, and he values his family. His elemental attribute is Fire, and his dragon jewel is located on his forehead.

- Shimon Nagareyama (流山詩紋, Nagareyama Shimon)
  - Voiced by: Kouki Miyata (宮田幸季)

One of the Hachiyō, he is the Suzaku of Earth (地の朱雀). Shimon is a junior high student and a friend of Akane who also is pulled into Kyō. The Oni Clan is said to have blond hair and blue eyes, and because Shimon has a similar appearance, the people of Kyō often mistake him for an Oni. His elemental attribute is Earth, and his dragon jewel is located on the back of his right hand.

- Fujiwara no Takamichi (藤原鷹通)
  - Voiced by: Shigeru Nakahara (中原茂)

One of the Hachiyō, he is the Byakko of Heaven (天の白虎). Takamichi is a nobleman, and he works in the government as the Vice Minister of Civil Affairs. He has a serious but calm personality, and a strong sense of justice. His elemental attribute is Heaven, and his dragon jewel is located on the right side of his neck.

- Tachibana no Tomomasa (橘友雅)
  - Voiced by: Kazuhiko Inoue (井上和彦)

One of the Hachiyō, he is the Byakko of Earth (地の白虎). Like Takamichi, Tomomasa is a nobleman, employed as a Lieutenant of the Left Imperial Guard. He is aloof and easy-going, and though he hides it much of the time, he is a good judge of character. His elemental attribute is Swamp, and his dragon jewel is located between his collar bones.

- Eisen (永泉)
  - Voiced by: Soichiro Hoshi (保志総一朗)

One of the Hachiyō, he is the Genbu of Heaven (天の玄武). Eisen is the Emperor's half-brother who has left the Imperial Family and become a monk. He is a refined youth who hates conflict. He plays the flute skillfully. His elemental attribute is Water, and his dragon jewel is located in the palm of his left hand.

- Abe no Yasuaki (安倍泰明)
  - Voiced by: Akira Ishida (石田彰)

One of the Hachiyō, he is the Genbu of Earth (地の玄武). Yasuaki is an Onmyōji, and a disciple to the famous, historical Onmyōji Abe no Seimei. He is cold and analytical. Because he is an artificial human created by Abe no Seimei, Yasuaki lacks human emotions. His elemental attribute is Mountain, and his dragon jewel is located beneath his right eye.

- Fujihime (藤姫)
  - Voiced by: Ikue Otani (大谷育江)

She is the only remaining descendant of the Star Clan, who is destined to assist the Ryūjin no Miko. Fujihime is very responsible, and laments that her young age keeps her from being a greater help to Akane.

=== Oni Clan ===
- Akuram (アクラム)
  - Voiced by: Ryotaro Okiayu (置鮎龍太郎)

The leader of the Oni Clan, he summoned Akane to Kyō. Akuram intends to use Akane's powers to rule Kyō. Akuram is a callous leader, who sees his fellow Oni as pawns.

- Ikutidaal (イクティダール)
  - Voiced by: Koji Ishii (石井康嗣)

An Aide to Akuram, Ikutidaal is in love with Inori's older sister, Seri, and the divide between Oni and humans causes him to suffer.

- Shirin (シリン)
  - Voiced by: Maria Kawamura (川村万梨阿)

The only female among the Oni Clan, Shirin holds affection for Akuram. She flaunts her feminine charms as a shirabyoshi, and uses them to snare men. There was even a small chapter in the manga where she offered herself to Takamichi, but he refused her, sensing a sort of distrust about her when she danced for the officials. In the end of the chapter, he fights her to defend Akane and wounds her arm. Instead of killing her like most men would, he, instead, bandaged up her arm. If one were to look very closely at the scene, you could see her blushing and having a very thoughtful expression as she watches him wrap the sling around her forearm and as she leaves him to go back to Akuram.

- Sefuru (セフル)
  - Voiced by: Yuu Asakawa (浅川悠)

This half-human, half-Oni boy was abandoned at birth, but Akuram took him in and raised him. Sefuru has no love for the Ryūjin no Miko.

- Ran (ラン)
  - Voiced by: Hoko Kuwashima (桑島法子)

The one among the Oni Clan that can summon Onryō. Ran is actually Tenma's long lost sister, whom Akuram abducted. She is the Kokuryū no Miko (黒龍の神子, Priestess of the Black Dragon), and she controls the yin aspect of the Ryūjin.

== Themes ==
The world of Harukanaru Toki no Naka de is based on the height of the Heian Period of Japanese history, and many aspects of Heian culture, as described in the great literature of the time, are depicted in the game.

== Releases ==
All titles developed by Ruby Party and published by Koei / Koei Tecmo unless noted. List does not include limited editions, classic, or treasure box releases.

Title	Release date	Platform	Notes
Haruka: Beyond the Stream of Time (遙かなる時空の中で, Harukanaru toki no naka de)	April 6, 2000	PlayStation	Ported to Game Boy Advance on August 23, 2002
Haruka: Beyond the Stream of Time 2 (遙かなる時空の中で2, Harukanaru toki no naka de 2)	September 28, 2001	PS2	Ported to Windows in 2002 and PSP in 2005
Haruka: Beyond the Stream of Time 3 (遙かなる時空の中で3, Harukanaru toki no naka de 3)	December 22, 2004	PS2	
Haruka: Beyond the Stream of Time 3: Izayoiki (遙かなる時空の中で3 十六夜記, Harukanaru toki no naka de 3 izayoiki; lit. 'Chronicle of the Sixteen-Day-Old Moon')	September 22, 2005	PS2	
Haruka: Beyond the Stream of Time 3: Unmei no Labyrinth (遙かなる時空の中で3 運命の迷宮, Harukanaru toki no naka de 3 unmei no rabirinsu; lit. 'Labyrinth of Fate')	March 23, 2006	PS2, PSP	
Haruka: Beyond the Stream of Time 4 (ja:遙かなる時空の中で4, Harukanaru toki no naka de 4)	June 19, 2008	PS2, PSP, Wii	
Haruka: Beyond the Stream of Time 5 (ja:遙かなる時空の中で5, Harukanaru toki no naka de 5)	February 24, 2011	PSP	
Haruka: Beyond the Stream of Time 5: Kazahanaki (遙かなる時空の中で5 風花記, Harukanaru toki no naka de 5 kazahanaki)	February 23, 2012	PSP	
Haruka: Beyond the Stream of Time 6 (ja:遙かなる時空の中で6, Harukanaru toki no naka de 6)	March 12, 2015	PSP, PS Vita, Switch	
Haruka: Beyond the Stream of Time 7 (ja:遙かなる時空の中で7, Harukanaru toki no naka de 7)	June 18, 2020	Switch	

=== Other Haruka video games ===
All titles developed by Ruby Party and published by Koei / Koei Tecmo unless noted. List does not include limited editions, classic, or treasure box releases.

Title	Release date	Platform	Notes
Haruka: Beyond the Stream of Time: Banjo Yugi (遙かなる時空の中で 盤上遊戯, Harukanaru toki no naka de banjo yugi)	June 26, 2003	PlayStation	
Haruka: Beyond the Stream of Time: History (遙かなる時空の中で ヒストリー, Harukanaru toki no naka de hisutori)	April 1, 2005	PS2	
Haruka: Beyond the Stream of Time ~Hachiyosho~ (遙かなる時空の中で ～八葉抄～, Harukanaru toki no naka de hachiyosho)	April 1, 2005	PS2	Companion game to the anime television series.
Haruka: Beyond the Stream of Time: Maihitoyo (遙かなる時空の中で 舞一夜, Harukanaru toki no naka de maihitoyo)	September 21, 2006	PS2	Companion game to the anime feature film.
Haruka: Beyond the Stream of Time: Yume no Ukihashi (遙かなる時空の中で 夢浮橋, Harukanaru toki no naka de yume no ukihashi)	August 28, 2008	DS	
Haruka: Beyond the Stream of Time: Yume no Ukihashi Special (遙かなる時空の中で 夢浮橋 Special, Harukanaru toki no naka de yume no ukihashi supesharu)	January 29, 2009	PS2	

== Adaptations ==
=== Manga ===
The first Haruka: Beyond the Stream of Time game was adapted into a manga series serialized in the Japanese manga magazine LaLa DX. The series was also printed in volumes published by Hakusensha. The manga was illustrated by Tohko Mizuno, who was also the game's character designer.

The manga series was licensed in English by Viz Media as Haruka: Beyond the Stream of Time for serialization in their Shojo Beat magazine as well as tankōbon releases. The Japanese and English editions of the manga both were collected in 17 volumes.

The sixth video game series received a manga adaptation in Kodansha's Aria magazine by the game's character designer Tohko Mizuno in 2015.

=== Anime ===
There have been multiple anime adaptations of Haruka: Beyond the Stream of Time. The first OVA Harukanaru Toki no Naka de Ajisai Yumegatari (遙かなる時空の中で 紫陽花ゆめ語り, In a Distant Time: Hydrangea Dreamtale) was directed by Iku Suzuki and produced by Zexcs. It was released in 2002 in two episodes and was based on the first video game. Ajisai Yumegatari describes briefly Akane's coming to Kyou and her involvement with the Hachiyou.

An anime television series called Harukanaru Toki no Naka de Hachiyō Shō was produced by Yumeta Company and adapted Mizuno's manga adaptation of the story line of the first game. It was directed by Aki Tsunaki, and aired from 2004 to 2005 for 26 episodes. It was dubbed and released in English as Haruka: Beyond the Stream of Time: A Tale of the Eight Guardians. The anime series was followed by two OVA episodes Ten and Chi. On August 19, 2006, a feature film titled Harukanaru Toki no Naka de Maihitoyo (劇場版 遙かなる時空の中で 舞一夜) was released. Tubi TV later added the series.

Other Haruka installments received OVA adaptations. Haruka: Beyond the Stream of Time 2 ~Priestess of the White Dragon~ (遙かなる時空の中で2～白き龍の神子～, Harukanaru Toki no Naka de 2 ~Shiroki Ryū no Miko~) was produced by Yumeta Company and was released in three episodes from 2003 to 2005, covering the storyline of the second installment of the video game franchise. The third installment received several OVAs: Harukanaru Toki no Naka de 3: Kurenai no Tsuki (遙かなる時空の中で3 紅の月) was released on December 28, 2007, by Yumeta Company and was directed by Toshiya Shinohara. It was released as a single OVA with a bonus "Onsen Chibi special". On January 3, 2010, a sequel Harukanaru Toki no Naka de 3: Owari Naki Unmei (遙かなる時空の中で3 終わりなき運命, lit."Haruka: Beyond the Stream of Time 3: The Endless Destiny") was released. It was directed by Shigeru Kimiya.

=== Movie ===
A live action movie was also released in early 2008 in Japan.

=== Other games ===
The Koei Tecmo crossover game Warriors All-Stars is the first title featuring Haruka series elements to appear in an official release outside of Japan. The game features many characters from across Koei Tecmo's history of games, including the Haruka series itself, with characters from the sixth entry, Hajime Arima and Darius, included as playable. Arima is available as one of the initial playable characters, while Darius can only be unlocked under certain conditions.

== Related products ==
=== CD ===
==== Drama CD ====
- Harukanaru Toki no Naka de Hachiyō Houga no Maki (遙かなる時空の中で〜八葉萌芽の巻, In a Distant Time: Sprouts of the Eight Leaves (Hachiyō)) (two parts)
- Harukanaru Toki no Naka de Hachiyō Misato Ibun Ichi – Kenka no Maki (遙かなる時空の中で〜八葉みさと異聞 壱・剣花の巻, In a Distant Time: Hachiyō Capital Side Story 1 – Kenka Chapter)
- Harukanaru Toki no Naka de Hachiyō Misato Ibun Ni – Yuzuriha no Maki (遙かなる時空の中で〜八葉みさと異聞 弐・譲葉の巻, In a Distant Time: Hachiyō Capital Side Story 2 – Yuzuriha Chapter)
- Harukanaru Toki no Naka de Hachiyō Misato Ibun San – Matsuyoi no Maki (遙かなる時空の中で〜八葉みさと異聞 参・待宵の巻, In a Distant Time: Hachiyō Capital Side Story 3 – Matsuyoi Chapter)
- Harukanaru Toki no Naka de Hachiyō Misato Ibun Yon – Seiran no Maki (遙かなる時空の中で〜八葉みさと異聞 四・青嵐の巻, In a Distant Time: Hachiyō Capital Side Story 4 – Seiran Chapter)

==== Variety CD ====
- Harukanaru Toki no Naka de Hachiyō Misato Ibun – Hana no Utage (遙かなる時空の中で〜八葉みさと異聞 花の宴, In a Distant Time: Hachiyō Capital Side Story – Banquet of Flowers) (a mail-in present for buying the Hachiyo- Misato Ibun drama series)
- Harukanaru Toki no Naka de Kachōfūgetsu (遙かなる時空の中で 花鳥風月, In a Distant Time: Flower, Bird, Wind and Moon)
- Harukanaru Toki no Naka de Onban Sōshi: Hakkō no Maki – Seiran no Maki (遙かなる時空の中で〜音盤草紙 白虹の巻・青嵐の巻, In a Distant Time Musical Storybook: White Rainbow Chapter – Seiran Chapter) (LaLa magazine special)
- Harukanaru Toki no Naka de Onban Sōshi: Ten no Maki – Chi no Maki (遙かなる時空の中で〜音盤草紙 天の巻・地の巻, In a Distant Time Musical Storybook: Heaven Chapter – Earth Chapter) (LaLa magazine special)
- Harukanaru Toki no Naka de Uta Sōshi: Ryōfū no Utage (遙かなる時空の中で〜歌草紙 涼風の宴, In a Distant Time Vocal Storybook: Banquet of Cool Breezes)

==== Vocal and soundtrack CD ====
- Harukanaru Toki no Naka de Hachiyo- Misato Ibun – Miyabi no Hibiki (遙かなる時空の中で〜八葉みさと異聞 雅の響, In a Distant Time: Hachiyo- Capital Side Story – Echoes of Refinement)
- Harukanaru Toki no Naka de Hachiyo- Misato Ibun – Kimi Koi Furu Uta (遙かなる時空の中で〜八葉みさと異聞 君恋ふる歌, In a Distant Time: Hachiyo- Capital Side Story – Kimi Koi Furu Uta)
- Harukanaru Toki no Naka de Utagasane (遙かなる時空の中で〜うたがさね, In a Distant Time: Overlapping Songs)
- Harukanaru Toki no Naka de Ajisai Yumegatari: Otoshizuku (遙かなる時空の中で〜紫陽花ゆめ語り 音滴, In a Distant Time Hydrangea Dreamtale: Sound Droplets)
- Harukanaru Toki no Naka de Shishin Miniarubamu (遙かなる時空の中で〜四神ミニアルバム, In a Distant Time: Four Gods Mini Album)

== Reception ==
On release, Famitsu magazine scored the Game Boy Advance version of the game a 31 out of 40.

The manga adaptation was generally received poorly, with reviewers recommending other fantasy manga such as Inuyasha or Fushigi Yuugi instead. One reviewer said, "Looking past the fact that the plot is blatant rip-off of Fushigi Yûgi, Haruka is so poorly written as to be almost incomprehensible to anyone who hasn't played the game." Another stated that "The very ending of the [last] volume, and thereby the series as a whole, suffers from a lack of explanation", but did offer praise for the art, saying "Mizuno's drawings really are a pleasure to look at."

== See also ==
- Harukanaru Toki no Naka de Hachiyō Shō
- Harukanaru Toki no Naka de 2
- Harukanaru Toki no Naka de 3
- Angelique
- Kiniro no Corda
