= Yume Kira Dream Shoppe =

Japanese manga

- Yume-Kira Dream Shoppe
- Cover art for Yume Kira Dream Shoppe

ゆめゆめ煌々堂 (Yume-yume Kira-kira Dō)
- Genre: Fantasy
- Manga
- Written by: Aqua Mizuto
- Published by: Shogakukan
- English publisher: NA: Viz Media
- Magazine: Shōjo Comic
- English magazine: NA: Shojo Beat
- Original run: July 26, 2005 – ?
- Volumes: 1

Yume-Kira: Dream Shoppe (ゆめゆめ煌々堂, Yume-yume Kira-kira Dō) is a Japanese manga series by Aqua Mizuto. It originally ran in Shogakukan's manga magazine Shōjo Comic and then was serialized in Viz Media's Shojo Beat magazine from April 2007 to July 2007.

The manga composes of a collection of short stories connected by the concept of the Dream Shoppe; as a result, it introduces new characters with each chapter and how the Dream Shoppe comes to change the characters' lives.

== Story ==
Rin is the mysterious shopkeeper of the Yume Kira Dream Shoppe, a magical storefront shop which flies through the sky at dusk. Listening for wishes that travel on the wind and aided by an assistant named Alpha, Rin offers magical wares to grant these wishes at the cost of something dear to the customer.

== Characters ==
Rin
The mysterious but kind shopkeeper of the Yume Kira Dream Shoppe. Rin's shop is filled with wondrous items and Rin offers them to customers as a means to grant their wishes... at a price. Rin's gender remains ambiguous for most of the story and a conversation between Alpha and King implies that Rin is female. The author's notes at the end of the volume reveal that she prefers to leave Rin's gender undisclosed.
Alpha (α)
Rin's assistant, an excitable plush rabbit without a mouth though he can speak and move on its own. He originally belonged to a lonely girl named Noa, who confided in Alpha often. Wanting to end her loneliness, he wished to be able to speak and move to help her; Rin appeared to him, offering the means to do so until Christmas at the price of Alpha's red eyes. However, when the time came to collect his fee, Alpha fell into a river because he believed he was the reason Noa couldn't find her courage. Rin saves him and offers him a job as his assistant because it was lonely working at the shop with no one to talk to.
Hazuki
A tree who considers itself a failure because it is unable to blossom. It falls in love with a young composer, whose music gives it strength. Rin offers the tree the power to become a human so it may confess its love for the composer, but at the cost of all its beautiful leaves. When she finally blossoms, Rin gives her a drink of green tea containing the Wings of the Thousand Year Crane (since she paid too much) to allow her to continue living as a human.
Kana Shinya
A young composer who stays in a hospital because he has a tumour in his brain that slowly takes away the use of his hands. The sound of his music gives Hazuki strength to begin blossoming. He is initially cynical and cold because the pop group he was supposed to tour with found a replacement when he became hospitalized. He finds inspiration again when he falls in love with Hazuki, who wishes to give up her life to cure him of his disease.
Noa Ozawa
A shy girl who often confides in her plush rabbit, Alpha, and is happy when Alpha suddenly develops the ability to speak and move. While she was initially hindered by her dependence on relieving her loneliness with Alpha's company, the plush rabbit eventually helps her find the courage to admit her feelings to the boy she likes.
Yuki Umeda
The boy Noa likes, who has a slightly strange sense of humour. Yuki finds Noa's antics charming and likes her in return. He does not know Noa's own feelings for him until Alpha brings him a present that Noa had made for Yuki, but could not bring herself to give him.
Miki
A young woman in college who shows up at the Dream Shoppe, wounded and missing her memory. She is allowed to use the King's Hourglass to relive a portion of her past in hopes of changing it. She rediscovers her love for Renji, but is unable to reveal her doubts concerning their relationship. She is nearly run over a car until Renji saves her, though at the cost of his life - the event that caused her to lose her memory. However, Rin uses Miki's payment to change the outcome and save them both.
Renji Yakumo
A talented jewellery designer who goes to Miki's college and wishes to study art abroad someday. He and Miki start going out after they become friends. Though he is quite busy, he makes time for Miki and truly cares about her, despite the fact Miki feels as they have not become closer during the time they have spent together. He saves her from being hit by a car but is injured along the way. Fortunately, Rin had dropped the earring collected from Miki, redirecting the trajectory of the car and saving them.
Koyoru Hino
A girl who is too shy to even speak to the guy she likes and longs for a way to meet him. She finds herself in the Labyrinth Sea and is subsequently brought to the Dream Shoppe by Jack and King. Koyoru accepts the Nightmare Candy in hopes of finding a way to change herself in exchange for the forms she tries with the Nightmare Candy she chooses not to become. She realizes she wishes for the one she likes to call her by her name instead of telling her that he loves her in her dream and chooses her true self.
Eito Kudoh
An rising actor and model who attends Koyoru's school, though he is frequently absent because of his career. Koyoru is in love with him and to get closer to him, accepts the Nightmare Candy to enter his dreams and find a way to become closer to him. He appears to be kind and friendly, especially when he meets Koyoru in real life. During Koyoru's last dream, she smiles at him and thanks him for saying he loved her in her dream. The next day, in a magazine, he states that he would fall in love with someone with a beautiful smile like the girl in his dreams.
Jack
A pirate and King's older brother, a responsible and level-headed young man. Together, Jack and King sail across the Labyrinth Sea on their ship, the Silver Queen. He appears to have a close and understanding relationship with Rin. The brothers deliver goods to Rin's Dream Shoppe in the dusk sky.
King
Jack's younger brother, upbeat and somewhat reckless, but friendly and generous. He is infatuated with Rin and wishes to marry her. Though he first appears as a young adult, he is actually just a child. He was self-conscious about being younger than Rin, so he changed his appearance to look her age.

== Chapters ==
1. The Sound that Brings Blossoms
2. Beyond the Red Eye
3. A Promise to a Grain of Time
4. The Labyrinth Wave of Dreams

== Relics ==
- Silver Rabbit's Clock
- Moon Maiden's Tears - An item that allows the drinker use the moon's power to transform into anything it wants until the next full moon. According to Alpha, the "Maiden's Tears" series are a big hit at the Yume Kira Dream Shoppe.
- Wings of the Thousand Year Crane - The wings of a crane said to have lived for one thousand years. If drunk in green tea, it will grant the drinker one hundred years of life.
- Space Garnet - A jewel the colour of Alpha's eye that comes from a part of space not shared by any world. Its magical properties allows the plush rabbit to move and speak on its own. The effects work only until Christmas.
- Forest Maiden's Tears - Presumably part of the "Maiden's Tears" series of items. Alpha uses it to decorate a Christmas tree.
- Purple Coral - Alpha uses it to decorate a Christmas tree.
- Snow Ring - Alpha uses it to decorate a Christmas tree.
- King's Hourglass - An hourglass that can chisel time into golden sand, allowing someone to travel through time. As the grains of sand drop into the lower bulb, the past will move to the present, regardless of the actions of the person who uses it. Normally not for sale, Rin makes an exception to allow Miki to use it.
- Nightmare Candy - Take one and go to bed and one can enter someone else's dream in any form of their choosing. The candy allows a person to try different forms and become the form most to their liking in reality in exchange for the forms they have rejected. Should a person choose to remain as they are, the rejected dream forms return to being candy.
