= Marc Weidenbaum =

American editor (born 1966)

- Born: August 3, 1966 (age 60)
- Education: Yale University
- Occupation: editor
- Known for: Magazine editing
- Website: http://www.disquiet.com

Marc Weidenbaum (born 1966) publishes a webzine, Disquiet, about electronic ambient music and has contributed to the scientific journal Nature upon this subject. He was also a vice-president of magazines and an editor-in-chief for two of Viz Media's magazines.

== Career ==
Prior to his current position, he was a laundry room attendant at summer camp; an office manager at a graphic design company; a senior editor at Tower Records' Pulse! (and Classical Pulse!) magazine from 1989–1996, and as contributing editor to Pulse! from 1997–2002; and the editorial director for music at citysearch.com.

At Viz Media he was the managing editor of Shonen Jump. and was then promoted to editorial director after helping launch the Naruto Collector magazine. Later he became vice president and editor-in-chief of both Shonen Jump and the sister magazine Shojo Beat. He left the company in February 2009.

== Writing and editing ==
In 1991, he wrote for Pulse! upon the popularity of Gregorian chants with college dope-smokers. Pulse! magazine published a monthly cartoon and his editorial policy was to ask artists to submit three strip cartoons to choose from. He now writes for the journals Nature and his web magazine Disquiet on the subject of ambient sound and experimental music. In 2014 Bloomsbury published his book on the album Selected Ambient Works Volume II by Aphex Twin as part of its 33 1/3 series.
