= Crimson Hero =

Japanese manga series

- Crimson Hero volume 3

紅色HERO (Beniiro Hero)
- Genre: Sports, Romance, Comedy
- Manga
- Written by: Mitsuba Takanashi
- Published by: Shueisha
- English publisher: NA: Viz Media
- Magazine: Bessatsu Margaret
- English magazine: NA: Shojo Beat
- Original run: 2003 – 2011
- Volumes: 20

Crimson Hero (紅色HERO, Beni-iro Hīrō) is a Japanese sports-themed manga series written and illustrated by Mitsuba Takanashi. Crimson Hero is serialized in Shueisha's shōjo manga magazine Bessatsu Margaret.

== Plot summary ==
The series follows Nobara Sumiyoshi, a 15-year-old tomboy with a passion for volleyball. Her love of the sport is disapproved of by her mother, who wishes for Nobara to become the next hostess for their family's ryotei. Frustrated by her mother's constant pressure and frequent comparisons between herself and her sister, Nobara finally decides one day to move out and make it on her own. After seeking out her aunt for help, Nobara ends up living with four members of Crimson Field High School's boys' volleyball team as their dorm mother. What follows is a drama of a girl's dream of making it into volleyball, and her difficult journey in fulfilling that dream.

Unfortunately, the Crimson Field girls' volleyball team has been disbanded due to lack of interest and some meddling by her mother. Nobara successfully reinstates the team after challenging the boys' team in a three-on-three game, winning, and recruiting three more members to the team, including star setter Tomoyo Osaka.

Before her first official match, Nobara learns her sister Soka has been forced to go on a date with a politician's son. Soka calls Nobara two hours before the girls' volleyball team's first game and she runs to Soka's aid. Following Soka's rescue, she witnesses Nobara play volleyball and sees how truly happy Nobara is while playing. The sisters make a deal with her mother to allow Nobara to play volleyball until she graduates high school, when she will inherit the inn. Until then, her sister will assist their mother in running the inn.

== Characters ==
=== Crimson Field Girls' Volleyball Team ===
Nobara Sumiyoshi (住吉 のばら, Sumiyoshi Nobara)
The tomboy heroine of this manga, a first year at Crimson Field. Her favorite thing to do is to play volleyball and even left her family's house because her mother was against her playing. She has had no interest in boys, until she starts developing feelings for Yushin. Unexpectedly, one night at the training camp, she accidentally tells Kanako that she likes Yushin just as he and the other volleyball members come out. When Yushin rejects her, she unexpectedly tells Yushin that he is a coward and that she doesn't want him to do anything. She is also aware that Keisuke likes her, but does not reciprocate his feelings and tries to maintain her relationship with him as friends. Nobara later improves her techniques, and becomes Yushin's girlfriend.
Yui Suzushiro (鈴城 結, Suzushiro Yui)
A third year at Crimson Field, the captain of the girls' volleyball team. She only had one school term left to play volleyball before graduating and so when the girls are knocked out of their first tournament, Yui leaves the team and the team elects Tomoyo as their new captain. She still helps out with the team as their manager, often giving Tomoyo advice when she needs it. Yui, after her departure from the team, started dating Takahashi.
Tomoyo Osaka (桜坂 智世, Osaka Tomoyo)
A second year at Crimson Field, Tomoyo was known to be a star volleyball player in junior high until she suffered an injury during a game and was forced to take a break. She resolved that she should no longer play volleyball, despite the fact she is considered a "genius setter" on the court. After a lot of persuasion, Tomoyo joins Nobara's team as the sixth member required to form the team. After Yui's departure, she is elected team captain. She has previously dated Keisuke and still has feelings for him, though she also knows that he likes Nobara.
Ayako Mochida (持田 綾子, Mochida Ayako)
A second year at Crimson Field. She is an experienced player and, along with Yui and Nobara, is one of the first three members of the team. She is somewhat airheaded, but takes on more responsibilities after Tomoyo becomes team captain. Ayako shows the most concern over Nobara's developing ability as a volleyball player when she starts to think that Nobara is too good to play with them.
Rena Komizo (小溝 玲奈, Komizo Rena)
A first year at Crimson Field. She has no experience playing volleyball, but because of her admiration of Nobara from watching her play during her match against the boys, Rena joins the team as the fourth member. At first she appears airheaded and silly and Mochida even refers to her as a dog. Despite being very small and short, but has fast reflexes and played tennis in junior high.
Kyoka Goto (後藤 京香, Gotō Kyōka)
A first year at Crimson Field and the fifth member of Nobara's team, who joins at the same time as Rena. A quiet girl, she played volleyball regularly in junior high. Her parents have expressed the desire for her to quit sports and attend cram school instead. However, she possesses a strong desire to continue playing volleyball along with studying.
Kanako Noda (野田 加奈子, Noda Kanako)
The newest member of the volleyball team, an athletic girl who actually joins the team to become closer to Yushin. She is somewhat overconfident with her athletic ability, but picks things up quickly. Kanako specializes as jumping as a result of her history as a high jumper although Nobara can jump higher than her. Kanako becomes more competitive with Nobara, and so they both become rivals.
Ms. Fumi Shima (嶋 文, Shima Fumi)
An abrasive woman hired by Momoko to coach the Crimson Field Girls' team. She is intimidating and does not hesitate to criticize and punish behaviour she deems unworthy of a team that wishes to play in the Spring Tournament. She has a younger brother, Ryo, who is also a powerful volleyball player.
Yae (八重), Mikako Ikeya (池谷 美加子, Ikeya Mikako), and Jun (じゅん)
Kanako's friends. They were basketball players in middle school, but agree to join the Crimson Field girls' volleyball team to support Kanako.

=== Crimson Field Boys' Volleyball Team ===
Yushin Kumagai (熊谷 祐信, Kumagai Yushin)
A first year at Crimson Field. Another star player on the boys' volleyball team and lives in the dorm with Nobara and Keisuke. Nobara tries to tell him that she likes him, however, he explains that is unfair to Satomi Abe. Almost immediately after, Yushin and Nobara see Satomi with another guy - and Satomi weakly tries to apologize to Yushin. Yushin later breaks up with her, after Nobara convinces him to talk with her. Kanako and Nobara have a crushes on him and Nobara unexpectedly tells Kanako just as Yushin and the other volleyball team members come out. He rejects her at first though he later confesses his love for Nobara, and Nobara accepts, but they officially start dating after the tournament. He also loves pudding, as he has been seen demanding a couple of times where it was.
Keisuke Haibuki (灰吹 圭介, Haibuki Keisuke)
A first year at Crimson Field, he is reserved, aloof, and to the point, but not unkind. Considered one of the best players on the boys' volleyball team, and he lives in the same dorm as Nobara. He breaks up with Tomoyo Osaka shortly after Nobara comes to live in his dorm, and he mysteriously explains this by saying he has had a crush on Nobara since grade school. As a child, he was asthmatic, which ostracized him from other children and caused him to develop his aloof and reserved personality. Nobara's indifference towards his condition and positive attitude inspired him to play volleyball and overcome his physical problems. He eventually agrees to become friends with Nobara for the time being since he still has feelings for her. He doesn't like the fact that Yushin hurt her.
Naoto Tsuchiya (土屋 直人, Tsuchiya Naoto)
A first year at Crimson Field and a member of the boys' volleyball team. He lives at the same dorm as Nobara and went to middle school with Yushin.
Tomonori Ichiba (市葉 友典, Ichiba Tomonari)
A first year at Crimson Field and a member of the boys' volleyball team. He lives at Nobara's dorm. He also went to the same middle school with Keisuke.
Kazuya Takahashi (高橋 和也, Takahashi Kazuya)
The captain of the boys' volleyball team. He has been dating Yui and he gets easily angered when the girls interfere with the boys' practice.

=== Nobara's family ===
Momoko Sumiyoshi (住吉 桃子, Sumiyoshi Momoko)
Nobara's maternal aunt, the younger sister of her mother, who was apparently disowned by the Sumiyoshi family. Momoko works as the school nurse at Crimson Field and the sponsor of the girls' volleyball team. She helps Nobara when she can, but draws the line at giving her money or doing anything that might enrage her older sister. Momoko seems cold to Nobara but really she cares about her.
Shizuko Sumiyoshi (住吉 静子, Sumiyoshi Shizuko)
Nobara's mother and the current hostess of a famous ryotei, she is known to have turn business around for the better ever since the downfall of business from her great-grandmother's generation. She hopes her elder daughter will soon give up volleyball and take the family business seriously.
Soka Sumiyoshi (住吉 爽香, Sumiyoshi Sōka)
Nobara's younger sister, who is graceful, quiet, and obedient. Nobara has always admired her sister's ability to be ladylike while Soka finds that she can always rely on Nobara to protect her. Soka, after seeing how volleyball makes Nobara truly happy, helps persuade their mother into allowing Nobara to continue playing volleyball until she graduates from high school while Soka helps run the inn.
Nobara's father
While her father cannot help Nobara as much as he would like, he shows how much he loves her by giving her money to buy food when Nobara and Soka persuade their mother into letting Nobara remain at Crimson Field. Nobara's father is very supportive of her about volleyball and her independence.
Nobara's grandmother
A traditional woman and former hostess of the Sumiyoshi's ryotei. She blames Nobara's behavior on volleyball and disapproves of her older granddaughter's behavior, often commenting that Nobara should be more like Sōka.

=== Other characters ===
Ryo Shima (嶋 良, Shima Ryō)
Ms. Shima's younger brother, Ms. Shima describes Ryo to be a powerful but reckless attacker whose style is similar to Nobara's. Shima sends Nobara to train with Ryo, believing that Ryo is still a member of Central Sokai University's prestigious volleyball team, unaware that he has not attended practices in over a year as a result of a falling out with his team; none of the other players believed someone of his short stature would be able to continue as an attacker. He continues to play beach volleyball with a group of misfit but powerful players in the local area as a team known as the Eagles and proves to be a very perceptive individual. When he is not playing volleyball, he is somewhat of a womanizer.
Satomi Abe (阿部 里美, Abe Satomi)
Yushin's girlfriend, whom he has been with since middle school. They began to drift apart after they began attending different high schools, though Satomi continued to attend all of Yushin's volleyball games to support him. However, in her loneliness, she cheats on Yushin with another boy and her infidelity is discovered shortly after Yushin rejects Nobara. They eventually break up.

== Volumes ==
No.	Original release date	Original ISBN	English release date	English ISBN
1	June 25, 2003	4-08-847643-3	November 29, 2005	978-1421501406
2	October 24, 2003	4-08-847678-6	April 4, 2006	978-1421503967
3	March 25, 2004	4-08-847726-X	August 1, 2006	978-1421505770
4	August 25, 2004	4-08-847775-8	December 5, 2006	978-1421505787
5	December 24, 2004	4-08-847812-6	April 3, 2007	978-1421510125
6	May 25, 2005	4-08-847857-6	August 7, 2007	978-1421510132
7	January 25, 2006	4-08-846024-3	December 4, 2007	978-1421510149
8	May 25, 2006	4-08-846060-X	May 6, 2008	978-1421515656
9	October 25, 2006	4-08-846106-1	October 7, 2008	978-1421515663
10	April 25, 2007	978-4-08-846164-9	March 3, 2009	978-1421523637
11	August 24, 2007	978-4-08-846205-9	August 4, 2009	978-1421523644
12	December 25, 2007	978-4-08-846248-6	January 5, 2010	978-1421527963
13	May 23, 2008	978-4-08-846296-7	June 1, 2010	978-1421527970
14	September 25, 2008	978-4-08-846334-6	November 2, 2010	978-1421532301
15	April 24, 2009	978-4-08-846400-8	—	—
16	August 25, 2009	978-4-08-846434-3	—	—
17	February 25, 2010	978-4-08-846497-8	—	—
18	July 23, 2010	978-4-08-846551-7	—	—
19	February 25, 2011	978-4-08-846626-2	—	—
20	June 24, 2011	978-4-08-846666-8	—	—
