= Shojo Beat =

Shōjo manga magazine (2005–2009)

- Shojo Beat Volume 1, Issue 1, cover dated July 2005
- Editor-in-Chief: Hyoe Narita
- Former editors: Yumi Hoashi; Marc Weidenbaum
- Categories: Shōjo manga
- Frequency: Monthly
- Circulation: 38,000 (2007)
- Publisher: Hyoe Narita
- First issue: July 2005
- Final issue Number: July 2009; Volume 5, Issue 7
- Company: Viz Media
- Country: United States
- Based in: San Francisco
- Language: English
- Website: shojobeat.com
- ISSN: 1932-1600

Shojo Beat is a shōjo manga magazine formerly published in North America by Viz Media. Launched in June 2005 as a sister magazine for Shonen Jump, it featured serialized chapters from six manga series, as well as articles on Japanese culture, manga, anime, fashion and beauty. After its initial launch, Shojo Beat underwent two redesigns, becoming the first English anthology to use the cyan and magenta ink tones common to Japanese manga anthologies. Viz launched a related imprint of the same name for female-oriented manga, light novels and anime.

Targeted at teenage girls, the first issue of Shojo Beat launched with a circulation of 20,000. By 2007, the average circulation was approximately 38,000 copies, with half coming from subscriptions rather than store sales. It was well received by critics, who praised its mix of manga series and the inclusion of articles on Japanese culture, though some critics found the early issues boring and poorly written. In May 2009, Viz announced that it was discontinuing the magazine; the July 2009 issue was the last released. Fans were disappointed at the sudden news. Industry experts felt its loss would leave female comic fans without a magazine of their own but praised Viz for its choice to continue using the Shojo Beat imprint and branding for its shōjo manga and anime releases.

== History ==
In February 2005, the San Francisco-based Viz Media announced the creation of a new manga anthology, Shojo Beat. Marketed as a sister publication of Viz's existing Shonen Jump, the magazine started with six manga titles: Crimson Hero, Kaze Hikaru, Baby & Me, Godchild, Nana, and Absolute Boyfriend. Of the six titles, two each came from Japanese publishers Shueisha, Shogakukan, and Hakusensha. The first issue, released in June 2005, featured Nana Komatsu of Nana on its July cover.

Yumi Hoashi was the publication's original editor-in-chief. In November 2006, Hoashi left Viz, and Marc Weidenbaum replaced him as the magazine's editor-in-chief. Weidenbaum remained the magazine's editor until February 13, 2009, when Viz announced that he had left the company, though the magazine continued to list his name in the role through the May 2009 issue. Starting with the June 2009 issue, publisher Hyoe Narita was listed as the editor-in-chief.

The magazine's panda mascot, Moko, was first introduced in the October 2005 issue, though he remained nameless until the July 2006 issue. He later was given his own Myspace account run by Viz. With the July 2007 issue, a new mascot, Beat Girl, was introduced. Included in each issue on the "Editor's Letter" page as the magazine's "illustrated spokesperson," she was drawn by different artists each time. A third mascot, a star-shaped figure named Hoshiko, was introduced with the March 2008 issue as a friend for Moko.

With the magazine's first anniversary issue, dated July 2006, Shojo Beat switched to using cyan and magenta ink tones for the manga pages rather than black-and-white. Though this mirrors the format of Japanese manga anthologies, it was a first for manga anthologies published in North America. Shojo Beat launched another redesign with the January 2007 issue. The new design included more vivid color schemes and fonts and introduced a new "Girl Hero" column to spotlight women Viz felt were charitable and selfless and who would inspire readers. The existing columns were also expanded.

In May 2009, the magazine stopped accepting new subscriptions and ceased publication with the release of the July issue. Existing Shojo Beat subscriptions were transferred to Viz's Shonen Jump magazine. With the first copy of Shonen Jump sent to former subscribers, a letter informed them of the transfer and how to request a refund for the unfilled portion of their subscriptions if they would prefer. In a press release, Viz stated that the "difficult economic climate" was behind the magazine's cancellation.

== Features ==
As a manga anthology, the bulk of Shojo Beat's content was its manga chapters. Additional features included a letter from the editor, manga related news, a preview chapter from another Viz manga title being published under the "Shojo Beat" imprint, and articles on Japanese culture, current trends in Japan, and fashion and beauty. Sections toward the back of the magazine featured fan-related material, including fan art, letters from readers, manga drawing lessons, and cosplay how-to guides and highlights. The magazine's official website included additional articles, downloads of templates for dressing up the magazine's panda mascot "Moko", and online previews of many of the manga series being published under the "Shojo Beat" label.

=== Series ===
Shojo Beat contained chapters from six Japanese manga series licensed and translated to English by Viz. During its run, the magazine featured fourteen series, of which seven ended their runs and were replaced by other series. Only four of those replacements remained in the magazine until all of their chapters had been published. Each title serialized in the magazine was also published in tankōbon volumes under Viz's "Shojo Beat" label. Viz noted that it periodically removed incomplete series from the magazine to help "keep the magazine fresh" and to allow it to speed up publication of the individual volumes.

This is a complete list of all titles that were serialized in Shojo Beat. It does not include preview chapters. The titles that were running in the magazine when it was discontinued are highlighted.

| Title | Creator(s) | First issue | Last issue | Fully serialized? |
|---|---|---|---|---|
| Absolute Boyfriend | Yuu Watase | July 2005 | March 2008 | Yes |
| Baby and Me | Marimo Ragawa | July 2005 | September 2007 | No |
| Backstage Prince | Kanoko Sakurakoji | October 2006 | March 2007 | Yes |
| Crimson Hero | Mitsuba Takanashi | July 2005 | July 2009 | No |
| Gaba Kawa | Rie Takada | April 2008 | August 2008 | Yes |
| Godchild | Kaori Yuki | July 2005 | June 2006 | No |
| Haruka: Beyond the Stream of Time | Tohko Mizuno | October 2007 | July 2009 | No |
| Honey and Clover | Chika Umino | September 2007 | July 2009 | No |
| Honey Hunt | Miki Aihara | September 2008 | July 2009 | No |
| Kaze Hikaru | Taeko Watanabe | July 2005 | September 2006 | No |
| Nana | Ai Yazawa | July 2005 | August 2007 | No |
| Sand Chronicles | Hinako Ashihara | August 2007 | July 2009 | No |
| Shojo Eve: Eve's Applework 24 Hours | Arina Tanemura | August 2007 | August 2007 | Yes |
| Vampire Knight | Matsuri Hino | July 2006 | July 2009 | No |
| Yume-Kira: Dream Shoppe | Aqua Mizuto | April 2007 | July 2007 | Yes |

=== Imprints ===
With the launch of the Shojo Beat magazine, Viz Media created new imprints for its manga and fiction lines. The "Shojo Beat" imprint included series featured in the magazine as well as other shōjo manga titles licensed by Viz after the magazine's conception. Viz began releasing a few Japanese light novels under a "Shojo Beat Fiction" imprint that were related to its "Shojo Beat" manga titles. In February 2006, Viz launched the "Shojo Beat Home Video" line for releasing anime titles primarily designed for female viewers. The first title under the new imprint was Full Moon o Sagashite, the anime adaptation of the same titled manga that was also released by Viz. To promote the new anime line, Viz included a preview disc of the first volume of Full Moon in the June 2006 issue of Shojo Beat. Though the magazine itself has been canceled, Viz stated in May 2009 that it will continue releasing both existing and new series under the "Shojo Beat" manga and anime imprints.

== Circulation and audience ==
When Shojo Beat launched, it had a circulation of 20,000. In 2006, its average circulation had increased to 35,000, of which 41% were distributed through subscriptions, and the rest sold in newsstands and stores. In 2007, the circulation grew to 38,000, and subscriptions increased to 51%. The magazine's audience was overwhelmingly female, comprising 91% of its readers. Targeted towards "young women", Shojo Beat's "core audience" was between the ages of 13 and 19 and made up 61% of its readers; 47% of readers were 12–17 and 45% were 18–34.

== Reception ==
Shojo Beat was nominated for a 2008 Society for the Promotion of Japanese Animation Award in the category of "Best Publication", but lost to Japan's Newtype.

In reviewing the premiere release of Shojo Beat, IGN's Jessica Chobot sharply criticized the magazine. She felt it looked and read "like a teenie-bopper magazine" and referred to the issue's cover as a "bright, hot-pink, migraine-inducing, bubble-lettered spectacle". She considered the contents boring, and disagreed with Viz's selection of series, noting, "it's as if Viz had taken everything from their backed-up reject pile and tried to pull one over on the female populace. 90% of what I was reading was either poorly drawn or poorly written (more often than not, it was both)." Comic World News' David Welsh disagreed, as he felt that the magazine had several good series, with Nana, Absolute Boyfriend and Crimson Hero as his version of the top three series of the initial issue. Greg McElhatton, co-founder of Wizard: The Guide to Comics and former reviewer for iComics.com, praised the magazine's mainstream appearance, calling it a "smart" decision, as it would draw in its target audience by visually showing them that it's a magazine for teenage girls. While he felt that two of the manga titles in the premiere issue had weak openings, he found that the magazine was "off to a good, if not great start".

After its cancellation, Publishers Weekly's Heidi MacDonald reported that the common response she saw from fans was that "everyone liked it but nobody paid for it". She noted that many fans expressed sorrow over the magazine's demise while indicating that they did not subscribe to it. Katherine Dacey, the former senior manga editor for PopCultureShock, remarked that the magazine had offered "just the right mixture of new stories, continuing series, and articles" and praised it for having a "funky, DIY vibe". The staff of the School Library Journal called the magazine "one of a kind" and felt that its loss would leave a void for female fans, a generally under-acknowledged group of comic and manga readers. Staff member Brigid Alverson felt Shojo Beat was a great overall package that "featured intelligent articles that allowed the reader to be enthusiastic about Japanese pop culture without being geeky" making it distinct from other magazines for girls that were normally "filled with brainless celebrity stories or service articles tied to commercial products". Other participants praised the magazine's fashion articles for its educational articles on Japanese culture and for featuring girls of a variety of body types wearing affordable fashions. Two staffers questioned Viz's decision to drop the magazine and wondered if the company had unrealistically expected the magazine to have the same circulation numbers as Shonen Jump.

== See also ==
- List of manga magazines published outside of Japan
