= Tohko Mizuno =

Japanese manga artist

Tohko Mizuno 水野十子
- Born: Tokushima Prefecture
- Areas: Manga artist, character designer
- Notable works: Haruka: Beyond the Stream of Time

Tohko Mizuno (水野十子, Mizuno Tōko; born August 7) is a Japanese manga artist who wrote and illustrated Haruka: Beyond the Stream of Time, a manga series based on the video game of the same name, of which Mizuno had worked on the character design. Haruka was serialized in LaLa DX from 1999 to 2010, and had an English serialization in Shojo Beat magazine. Hakusensha published Haruka in 17 volumes, while the English translation was pushed by Viz Media. The series was also adapted into an anime television series and a feature anime film. She has worked on several other Haruka installments.

== Works ==
=== Manga ===
Title	Year	Notes	Refs
Haruka: Beyond the Stream of Time	1999–2010	Serlalized in LaLa DX magazine Published by Hakusensha in 17 volumes Also fan	
Kimi to XOXO (キミにXOXO)		Serialized in Hana to Yume comics Published by Hakusensha in 1 volume	
Mukashi, oboronaru otoko arikeri (昔、朧なる男ありけり)		Serialized in Hana to Yume comics Published by Hakusensha in 1 volume	
Haruka: Beyond the Stream of Time 3		one-shot in LaLa magazine	
Haruka: Beyond the Stream of Time 4 draft from Ruby Party		Serialized in Hana to Yume magazine Published by Hakusensha in 1 volume	
Haruka: Beyond the Stream of Time 5 draft from Ruby Party		Serialized in Hana to Yume magazine Published by Hakusensha in 2 volumes	
Haruka: Beyond the Stream of Time 6	2015	Serialized in Aria magazine Published by Kodansha in 1 volume	

=== Video games ===
List of works in video games
Year	Series	Crew role	Notes	Source
	Haruka: Beyond the Stream of Time series	Character design		
