= Ikue Ōtani =

Japanese actress (born 1965)

- 大谷 育江(おおたに いくえ)
- Born: August 18, 1965 (age 61); Tokyo, Japan
- Other names: Ikue Ootani; Ikue Ohtani; Iku-chan
- Occupations: Actress; voice actress
- Years active: 1986–present
- Agent: Mausu Promotion
- Notable work: Pokémon as Pikachu; One Piece as Tony Tony Chopper and young Vinsmoke Sanji; Detective Conan as Mitsuhiko Tsuburaya; Persona 5 as Morgana

Japanese name
- Hiragana: おおたに いくえ
- Katakana: オオタニ イクエ
- Shinjitai: 大谷 育江
Transcriptions
- Romanization: Saisho Atsushi

Ikue Ōtani (大谷 育江, Ōtani Ikue; born August 18, 1965) is a Japanese actress who specializes in voice acting. She is best known for her anime roles in the Pokémon series (as Pikachu), One Piece (as Tony Tony Chopper), Detective Conan (as Mitsuhiko Tsuburaya), Corpse Party (as Sachiko Shinozaki), Naruto (as Konohamaru Sarutobi), Cookie Run: Kingdom (as Pancake Cookie), Smile PreCure! (as Candy), Uchi no Sanshimai (as Fu), Konjiki no Gash Bell (as Gash), and Persona 5 (as Morgana). She is currently affiliated with Mausu Promotion. Her pet name is "Iku-chan". She is known for playing both male and female roles, sometimes playing multiple roles in a single production. She is a native of Tokyo, but grew up in Niigata Prefecture.

== Filmography ==
=== Television animation ===
Year	Title	Role	Note
1986	Ganbare, Kickers!	Kiyoshi Hara	Ōtani's TV debut
1991–1992	21 Emon	Monga	
1992	Hime-chan's Ribbon	Himeko Nonohara, Princess Erika	
1992	Nangoku Shōnen Papuwa-kun	Kotaro	
1992	Yu Yu Hakusho	Masaru, Natsuko, Fubuki, Shura	
1993	Nekketsu Saikyō Go-Saurer	Takako Kojima, Yuka Mizuhara	
1994	DNA²	Mashi	
1994	Sailor Moon S	U-Chouten	
1994	Haō Taikei Ryū Knight	Blue	
1995	Gulliver Boy	Edison	
1995	Juuni Senshi Bakuretsu Eto Ranger	Usagi, Butashichi	
1996	Bakusō Kyōdai Let's & Go!!	Jirōmaru Takaba	
1996	Detective Conan	Mitsuhiko Tsuburaya	
1996	Martian Successor Nadesico	Yukina Shiratori	
1996	Sailor Moon Sailor Stars	Sailor Tin Nyanko / Suzu Nyanko	
1996	Slayers	Kira	
1996	Reideen The Superior	Fujimaru Mushanokouji	
1996	The Vision of Escaflowne	Merle	
1997	Pokémon	Pikachu, Misty's Goldeen, Misty's Starmie	
1998	Brain Powerd	Girl of Orphan	
1998	Flint the Time Detective	Obiru	
1998	Nightwalker: The Midnight Detective	Guni	
1998	Shadow Skill	Kyuo	
1998	Super Doll Licca-chan	Catherine	
1999	Ojamajo Doremi series	Hana-chan, Majo Monroe	
1999	ToHeart	Rio Hinayama	
1999	One Piece	Tony Tony Chopper/Chopperman, Sanji (child), Enishida, Fake Nami	
2000	Banner of the Stars	Seelnay	
2000	Pokémon: Mewtwo Returns	Pikachu	
2000	Moonlight Mask	Yamamoto Naoto	2nd season
2001	Go! Go! Itsutsugo Land	Mikan	
2001	Nono-chan	Nonoko Yamada	
2001	The SoulTaker	Maya Misaki	
2002	Inuyasha	Koryu	
2002	Tokyo Underground	Ciel Messiah	
2003	Ashita no Nadja	Rita Rossi	
2003	Saiyuki Reload	Seika	
2003	Astro Boy: Mighty Atom	Nina	
2003	Naruto	Konohamaru Sarutobi	
2003	PoPoLoCrois	Papuu	
2003	Zatch Bell!	Zatch Bell	Episodes 1–141
2004	Doki Doki School Hours	Shizuka Nagare	Also known as "Chairman (Iincho)"
2004	Hamtaro	Oshare	
2004	Harukanaru Toki no Naka de	Fujihime	
2004	Kannazuki no Miko	Sister Miyako, Saotome Makoto	
2004	Monster	Eruza	
2005	Oh My Goddess!	Sora Hasegawa	
2006	Kujibiki Unbalance	Renko Kamishakujii	
2008	Naruto: Shippuden	Konohamaru Sarutobi	
2011	Sergeant Keroro	Terara	
2012	Naruto SD: Rock Lee and his Ninja Pals	Konohamaru Sarutobi	
2012	Poyopoyo Kansatsu Nikki	Poyo	
2012	Smile PreCure!	Candy, Smile Pact	
2012	Hunter × Hunter (Second Series)	Cheadle Yorkshire	
2014	JoJo's Bizarre Adventure: Stardust Crusaders	Mannish Boy	
2014	PriPara	Unicorn	
2015	Blood Blockade Battlefront	Nej	
2015	Crayon Shin Chan	Suika Chan	Episode 870
2016	The Morose Mononokean	Yahiko	
2018–19	Persona 5: The Animation	Morgana	
2019	The Morose Mononokean II	Yahiko	
2019	Dororo	Yokai Kozo	
2021	Wonder Egg Priority	Dot, Hyphen, Kirara Rodriguez Matured XVIII Evening Star SS Plum	
2022	Dance Dance Danseur	Sawako Murao	
2023	Pokémon Horizons: The Series	Captain Pikachu, Sango	
2023	The Family Circumstances of the Irregular Witch	Doku-Koala	
2024	Puniru Is a Cute Slime	Runrūn	
2025	The Too-Perfect Saint: Tossed Aside by My Fiancé and Sold to Another Kingdom	Elsa Nautilus	

=== Theatrical animation ===
Year	Title	Role	Notes	Source
1988	My Neighbor Totoro	A Girl		
1993	Dorami-chan: Hello, Dynosis Kids!!	Maisuke	Short film	
1997–present	Detective Conan films	Mitsuhiko Tsuburaya	except for Detective Conan: The Private Eyes' Requiem	
1998–2020	Pokémon films	Pikachu		
1998	Martian Successor Nadesico: The Motion Picture – Prince of Darkness	Yukina Shiratori		
2000	Ojamajo Doremi #: The Movie	Hana-chan		
2000	Ah! My Goddess: The Movie	Sora Hasegawa		
2002–present	One Piece films	Tony Tony Chopper	Except for Giant Mecha Soldier of Karakuri Castle	
2004	Konjiki no Gash Bell!!: 101 Banme no Mamono	Gash Bell		
2005	Zatch Bell: Attack of Mechavulcan	Gash Bell		
2009	Keroro Gunso the Super Movie 4: Gekishin Dragon Warriors	Terara		
2012	Pretty Cure All Stars New Stage: Friends of the Future	Candy, Smile Pact		
2012	Smile PreCure! The Movie: Big Mismatch in a Picture Book	Candy, Smile Pact		
2012	Gothicmade	Love		
2013	Pretty Cure All Stars New Stage 2: Friends of the Heart	Candy, Smile Pact		
2017	Mary and the Witch's Flower	Tib-cat		
2019	Doraemon: Nobita's Chronicle of the Moon Exploration	Aru		
2020	Over the Sky	Gimon		
2024	Ghost Cat Anzu	Pi-Pi-chan		

=== Original video animation (OVA) ===
Year	Title	Role	Other notes
1990	CB Chara Nagai Go World	Sayaka Yumi	
1991	Shakotan Boogie	Yumi	
1993	Oh My Goddess!	Sora Hasegawa	
1996	Twin Signal	Signal	All 3 volumes
1997	Variable Geo	Manami Kusunoki	
2000	Legend of the Galactic Heroes Gaiden	Margareta von Herxheimer	
2002	Gate Keepers 21	Ayane Isuzu	
2002	Harukanaru Toki no Naka de~Ajisai Yumegatari~	Fuji-hime	
2002	Nurse Witch Komugi	Koyori Kokubunji, Maya	
2003	Harukanaru Toki no Naka de 2 ~Shiroki Ryuu no Miko~	Fujiwara no Yukari, Fujiwara no Misono	
2004	Ojamajo Doremi Na-i-sho	Hana-chan, Majo Monroe	
2005	Majokko Tsukune-chan	Kanako	
2013	Corpse Party	Sachiko Shinozaki	
2016	Persona 5: The Animation - The Day Breakers	Morgana	

=== Original net animation (ONA) ===
Year	Title	Role	Other notes
2021	Powerful Pro Yakyū Powerful Kōkō-hen	Akio Yabe	
2022	JoJo's Bizarre Adventure: Stone Ocean	Green Baby	

=== Video games ===
- Another Eden (Morgana, Nopaew)
- Ar tonelico Qoga (Mute)
- Battle Stadium D.O.N (Tony Tony Chopper)
- Blood Will Tell (Dororo)
- Brave Fencer Musashi (Topo, Jam)
- Cookie Run: Kingdom (Pancake Cookie)
- Corpse Party: Blood Covered Repeated Fear (Sachiko Shinozaki)
- Corpse Party: Book of Shadows (Sachiko Shinozaki)
- Corpse Party:Blood Drive (Sachiko Shinozaki)
- Corpse Party - The Anthology - Sachiko's Game of Love Hysteric Birthday 2U (Sachiko Shinozaki)
- Daraku Tenshi - The Fallen Angels (Musuran (Yuiran)
- Detective Conan: Tsuioku no Mirajiyu (Mitsuhiko Tsuburaya)
- Fire Emblem Awakening (Tiki)
- Fire Emblem Heroes (Adult Tiki)
- FIST (Ai Momoyama)
- Granblue Fantasy (Tony Tony Chopper)
- Guardian Heroes (Nicole Neil)
- Gulliver Boy (Edison)
- Gunbird 2 (Marion)
- Gunparade March (Isizu)
- Harukanaru Toki no Naka de as Fuji-hime
- Harukanaru Toki no Naka de 2 as Fujiwara no Yukari and Misono
- Harukanaru Toki no Naka de 3 as Hakuryuu (Child)
- The Hundred Line: Last Defense Academy (NIGOU)
- Kingdom Hearts II (Vivi Orunitia)
- Konjiki no Gash Bell!! series (Gash Bell)
- League of Legends (Teemo)
- Martian Successor Nadesico (Yukina)
- Marvel vs. Capcom series (Hoover)
- Mega Man Legends series (Data, Bon Bonne)
- Musashi: Samurai Legend (Amestris)
- Nora to Toki no Kōbō: Kiri no Mori no Majo (Keke)
- Ojamajo Doremi series (Hana-chan)
- One Piece series (Tony Tony Chopper)
- Onmyoji (Kohaku)
- Persona 5 (Morgana)
- Persona 5 Strikers (Morgana)
- Persona 5 Tactica (Morgana)
- Pokémon series (Pikachu)
- Popolocrois: Narcia's Tears and the Fairy's Flute (Kirara)
- Power Pros series (Akio Yabe)
- Pretty Fighter (Ai Momoyama)
- Project X Zone 2 (Tiki)
- Sdorica (Maria)
- Shenmue II (Fangmei)
- Shironeko Project (Nanahoshi)
- Smile Precure! Let's Go! Märchen World (Candy)
- Sonic Shuffle (Lumina, NiGHTS)
- Super Smash Bros. series (Pikachu)
- Super Smash Bros. Ultimate (Tiki (Japanese voice), Morgana (Japanese voice)) ^{a}
- Tales of the Abyss (Ion, Sync, Florian)
- ToHeart (Rio Hinayama)
- Tokimeki Memorial Girl's Side (Mizuki Sudou)
- Wild Arms Alter Code: F (Jane Maxwell)

^a The Japanese vocal tracks for these characters also appear in the Chinese and Korean versions of the game.

=== Live-action film ===
- Love & Peace (2015) – Kame (voice)
- Detective Pikachu (2019) – Detective Pikachu (voice)
- Patalliro! (2019) – (voice)

=== Drama CD ===
- Ouran High School Host Club (Mitsukuni Haninozuka)
- Elemental Gelade (Cisqua)

=== Dubbing roles ===
==== Live-action ====
- The Addams Family (Pugsley Addams (Jimmy Workman))
- Election (Tracy Flick (Reese Witherspoon))
- Forrest Gump (Forrest Gump Junior (Haley Joel Osment))
- Fuller House (Stephanie Tanner (Jodie Sweetin))
- How the Grinch Stole Christmas (Cindy Lou Who (speaking voice) (Taylor Momsen))
- How to Marry a Millionaire (New Era Movies edition) (Schatze Page (Lauren Bacall))
- Interview with the Vampire (2000 TV Tokyo edition) (Claudia (Kirsten Dunst))
- Jaws 2 (2022 BS Tokyo edition) (Sean Brody (Marc Gilpin))
- Kindergarten Cop (Dominic Palmieri (Christian and Joseph Cousins))
- Look Who's Talking Now (Mikey Ubriacco (David Gallagher))
- Nanny McPhee and the Big Bang (Vincent Green (Oscar Steer))
- Mercury Rising (Simon Lynch (Miko Hughes))
- Milk Money (Frank Wheeler)
- Multiplicity (Zack Kinney)
- One Fine Day (Maggie Taylor (Mae Whitman))
- One Piece (Young Sanji (Christian Convery)), (Tony Tony Chopper (Mikaela Hoover))
- Ramona and Beezus (Ramona Quimby (Joey King))
- See Spot Run (James (Angus T. Jones))
- The Shining (Danny Torrance (Courtland Mead))
- Space Buddies (Gravity (Amy Sedaris))
- Stuart Little (George Little (Jonathan Lipnicki))
- Uptown Girls (Laraine "Ray" Schleine (Dakota Fanning))
- West Side Story (1990 TBS edition) (Consuelo (Yvonne Wilder))

==== Animation ====
- Elemental (Clod)
- Hotel Transylvania 2 (Dennis)
- Hotel Transylvania 3: Summer Vacation (Dennis)
- Hotel Transylvania: Transformania (Dennis)
- My Little Pony: Equestria Girls (Apple Bloom)
- My Little Pony: Friendship is Magic (Apple Bloom)
- Moominvalley (Little My)

=== Others ===
- Sanrio character ("Cinnamoroll") (Chiffon, Milk)
