= Akifumi =

- Gender: Male

Origin
- Origin: Japanese
- Meaning: Different meanings depending on the kanji used

Akifumi (written: 哲郁, 昭文, 聡文, 彰文 or 章史) is a masculine Japanese given name. Notable people with the name include:

- Akifumi Endō (遠藤 章史; born 1964), Japanese voice actor
- Akifumi Miura (三浦 哲郁; born 1981), Japanese actor
- Akifumi Sakamoto (阪本 章史; born 1982), Japanese BMX rider
- Akifumi Shimoda (下田 昭文; born 1984), Japanese boxer
- Akifumi Tada (多田 彰文; born 1964), Japanese anime and video game composer
- Akifumi Takahashi (高橋 聡文; born 1983), Japanese baseball player
