= Touken Ranbu Warriors =

- Developers: Omega Force; Ruby Party
- Publishers: JP: DMM Games; WW: Koei Tecmo
- Directors: Akane Matsuura; Osamu Mieda
- Producer: Tomohiko Sho
- Designer: Satoshi Kokubo
- Programmer: Yukihiro Yata
- Artist: Asami Yamamoto
- Composers: Shinichiro Nakamura; Tomomi Fujiyoshi; Yuki Matsumura; Gota Masuoka; Daichi Sugaya
- Series: Dynasty Warriors; Touken Ranbu
- Platforms: Nintendo Switch; Windows
- Release: JP: February 17, 2022; WW: May 24, 2022
- Genre: Hack and slash
- Mode: Single-player

Touken Ranbu Warriors (Note: Known in Japan as Tōken Ranbu Musō (Japanese: 刀剣乱舞無双).) is a 2022 hack and slash video game developed by Omega Force and Ruby Party for the Nintendo Switch and Microsoft Windows. It was published in Japan by DMM Games in Japan and in the west by Koei Tecmo. It is a spin-off based on the long-running Touken Ranbu series, crossing with the gameplay of the Warriors series.

== Gameplay ==
The gameplay is modeled after the hack-and-slash Warriors series, in which the player controls a single character to defeat enemies throughout a stage while trying to achieve a specific goal. Players control various characters from the Touken Ranbu series. Between missions, players can participate in various mini-games and dating sim elements, to grow the relationships between the characters.

== Story ==
In Touken Ranbu Warriors, the Touken Danshi, without their master Saniwa-to in sight, have been aimlessly drifting through time, until getting attacked by the History Retrograde Army. Approached by the Government of the Time, the Touken Danshi are sent out to stop the History Retrograde Army, who aim to change Japan's history. They time travel through Sengoku-era Japan to correct history itself.

== Development ==
In August 2021, Koei Tecmo announced that Touken Ranbu Warriors was in development. The game is jointly developed by Omega Force and Ruby Party, with Ruby Party handling the story and simulation aspects, and Omega Force handling the combat.

Ruby Party Producer Mei Erkawa mentioned that they have been wanting to expand globally, and with Touken Ranbu Warriors they were given this opportunity. Erikawa mentioned that the market for otome games used to be small, but has risen significantly in popularity in recent years with the advent of mobile and browser games such as Touken Ranbu. Touken Ranbu Warriors was made with the intention of appealing to those who wanted to play something more involved, hence why the game released on Nintendo Switch, and was also designed to be welcoming to players new to the action genre.

The game was released for the Nintendo Switch and Windows on February 17, 2022 in Japan. It was later released on May 24, 2022, in North America and Europe for the Nintendo Switch and Steam.

== Manga adaptation ==
A manga adaptation illustrated by Nashinoki is set to begin serialization on Media Factory's Monthly Comic Gene magazine in March 2024.

== Reception ==
Reception

Aggregate score
Aggregator	Score
Metacritic	68/100

Review scores
Publication	Score
Destructoid	6/10
Nintendo Life	5/10
RPGamer	2.5/5
RPGFan	91%
Shacknews	6/10
The Games Machine (UK)	8.1/10
TouchArcade	3.5/5
Screen Rant	4/5

According to a manufacturer survey in Weekly Famitsu, the game targets fans of the original work as well as fans of the Warriors series and action games in general. Freelance writer Chihiro Yuki attributes the success of the Warriors series to its role in making action games—which were previously difficult for casual gamers and younger audiences to approach due to their high difficulty—more accessible. She notes that the success of collaboration titles between the Warriors series and popular IPs stems from a deep love and respect for the partner IP, and expresses her expectation that this title will demonstrate the same qualities ahead of its release.
