= Aqua Mizuto =

Japanese manga artist

Aqua Mizuto 水都あくあ
- Born: September 28, 1973 (age 53) Nagoya, Aichi Prefecture
- Area: Manga artist
- Notable works: Milk Crown, Almighty X 10

Aqua Mizuto (水都 あくあ, Mizuto Akua) is a Japanese manga artist who debuted in Shōjo Comic Extra in 1997 with Sakura no Hanasaku Negaigoto. She has published well over 30 short series, though her most popular are Yume Kira Dream Shoppe (published in English by Viz Media), Tenjin, Ranmaki Origami, Nighting + Night, and Almightly X 10.

== Manga ==
- Almighty X 10
- Go! Virginal Hanayuuki
- My Boy My Love
- Milk Crown
- Milk Crown H
- Milk Crown Lovers
- Knighting Night
- Sakura no Hana-saku Negaigoto
- Tsukarete Happy?!
- First Step
- No Girl
- Mafuyu no Miracle
- Darling Smoker
- M.G. Darling
- Yume Kira Dream Shoppe
