= Ruby Party =

Japanese video game developer

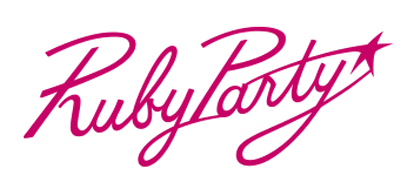
- Native name: ルビーパーティー
- Type: Division
- Industry: Video games
- Founded: 1990; 36 years ago
- Founder: Keiko Erikawa
- Headquarters: Yokohama, Kanagawa, Japan
- Key people: Mei Erikawa (president); Tōru Ogawa (Deputy Brand manager)
- Products: Angelique series
- Parent: Koei (1990–2010); Koei Tecmo (2010–present)

Ruby Party (ルビーパーティー, Rubī Pātī) is a Japanese video game developer and division of Koei Tecmo. The team was established around 1990 by Keiko Erikawa as a female-based team at Koei.

The team has mainly been producing the Neo Romance series, a series of otome games aimed at women. The first title released in this series is Angelique, released in 1994, and which is known as the first otome game in the world.

== History ==
In around 1985, Erikawa was developing various games with her husband Yōichi Erikawa. But the games in those days were all targeted to males. Erikawa thought it was strange that games aimed at women did not exist. There were almost no female staff in Koei at that point. Therefore, she started to recruit women as staff members, leading to an all-female development group within Koei, forming the Ruby Party team.

The first product of this team was the game Angelique in 1994. However, the team Ruby Party did not develop the game by itself. Yōichi Erikawa and his mainly male developing staff at Koei helped with the completion of Angelique.

In a 2018 Interview with Vice, Ruby Party president Mei Erikawa mentioned that, initially, there was strong resistance within Koei to develop a video game specifically marketed toward women, however Keiko Erikawa was firm in her belief that there's an untapped market, citing that "there are just as many women in the world as men". As at the time there weren't many female gamers, Keiko Erikawa also began experimenting with mixed-media, planning drama CDs and manga along the video game, instead of just magazine and TV advertisements, which were common at the time. Although it was not an immediate huge success, the mixed-media approach lent to Angelique gaining massive popularity after its release.

After the release of Angelique, Ruby Party has developed many otome games and planned various related projects such as OVAs, drama CDs, music CDs, anime, and live events. Ruby Party has since become one of the most influential developers of otome game visual novels and dating sims, as the Angelique series pioneered the otome game genre.

Harukanaru Toki no Naka de had become a major hit for Ruby Party, spawning multiple sequels and an anime television series. 2003's La Corda d'Oro had also become an international success for Ruby Party, also spawning multiple anime adaptions and sequels. A manga series based on it was picked up by Viz for English language publishing.

In 2021, Ruby Party released Buddy Mission Bond, published by Nintendo. They were approached by Nintendo during the development of the Nintendo Switch, who were looking to diversify the line-up of games for their upcoming video game console. The project was greenlit by Nintendo in 2016. At the time, Buddy Mission Bond was intended to be a traditional Ruby Party otome game, however during the game's development, the scale of the project continuously grew, until it went beyond its initial goal. Unlike Ruby Party's usual output, Buddy Mission Bond aimed for a wider appeal. Mei Erikawa said that it was a collaborative effort with Nintendo, as it wasn't an otome game, citing their inspiration to be shounen manga, and that the development was challenge for the team, which had never worked in that genre before.

=== Name ===
"Ruby Party" was named after the fact that the jewel ruby is considered to be the queen of jewelry, and it symbolizes passion and genuine love.

== Products ==
=== Neo Romance series ===
- Angelique series
- Harukanaru Toki no Naka de series (Haruka: Beyond the Stream of Time)
- Kin'iro no Corda series (La Corda d'Oro)
- Neo Angelique series
- Geten no Hana (下天の華),(2012, PlayStation Portable)
- Miss Princess, Mispri (MISS PRINCESS ミスプリ！),(2011, Nintendo DS) - Based on a manga from Nakayoshi
- Love phi Summit (ラブφサミット), (2010, mobile) - A cell phone game novel from the CWS Brains Ikebukuro Otome Kei service, defunct as of September 30, 2013. A side story was released as a light novel on October 15, 2010 by B's LOG Bunko. ISBN 978-4047268432 A manga version ran in Comic B's LOG Kyun alongside Neoromance title Sengoku Angelique. A Sapporo-exclusive anime was broadcast from November 27 to December 24, 2009, featuring theme song "Day by Day" by visual kei band D.

=== Other games ===
- FabStyle (2011, Nintendo DS and Nintendo 3DS)
- Attack on Titan: Escape from Certain Death (進撃の巨人死地からの脱出) (2017, Nintendo 3DS)
- Buddy Mission Bond (2021, Nintendo Switch)
- Touken Ranbu Warriors (刀剣乱舞無双) (February 17, 2022, Nintendo Switch and PC)
