= Naozumi Takahashi =

Japanese singer and voice actor

- 高橋 直純
- Born: December 6, 1971 (age 54); Ōshū, Iwate Prefecture, Japan
- Occupations: Voice actor, singer
- Years active: 1990s -
- Agent: T-Promotion

Naozumi Takahashi (高橋 直純, Takahashi Naozumi; born December 6, 1971) is a Japanese singer and voice actor who released the two popular singles "Soshite Omae ni Deaeta Dake De" and "Muteki na Smile". Naozumi's single "Ashita No Kioku" was used as an opening theme for Black Blood Brothers.

== Filmography ==
=== Anime ===
- Kamikaze Kaito Jeanne (1999) as Minazuki Yamato
- Ojamajo Doremi (1999) as Takurou
- Digimon Adventure 02 (2000) as Wormmon, Minomon, Mantaro Inoue, Operator
- Ashita no Nadja (2003) as Fernando
- Futari wa Pretty Cure (2004) as Ryota Misumi
- Konjiki no Gash Bell!! (2005) as Momon
- C (2011) as Ichiro Horii
- Scared Rider Xechs (2016) as Duesenberg
- Marginal#4: Kiss kara Tsukuru Big Bang (2017) as Rui Aiba
- Nanbaka (2017) as Ruka Gojou

Unknown date

- The Prince of Tennis (????) as Bunta Marui
- Harukanaru Toki no Naka de 1, 2, & 3 as Inori, Isato, & Hinoe respectively

=== OVA ===
- Growlanser (2005) as Crevaniel

=== Video games ===
- Harukanaru Toki no Naka de 1 as Inori
- Harukanaru Toki no Naka de 2 as Isato
- Harukanaru Toki no Naka de 3 as Hinoe
- Harukanaru Toki no Naka de 4 as Toya
- WebKare as Aiba Shun
- Super Robot Wars GC as Akimi Akatsuki
- Super Robot Wars XO as Akimi Akatsuki
- 12Riven as Omega Inose
- Gekka Ryouran Romance as Kano Atsumori
- MARGINAL#4 IDOL OF SUPERNOVA as Aiba Rui
- ALICE=ALICE [Cheshire cat]
- 8 bit lovers [Slime]
- Crimson Clan as Hu Shixiao

=== Voice actor on drama CDs ===
- Michael on Angel Sanctuary
- Coud in Elemental Gelade
- Nitta Kazuto in Dr. Hayami – Super Stylish Doctors Story (SSDS): Ai no Kaitai Shinshou, with Show Hayami, Hiyama Nobuyuki, Morikawa Toshiyuki, Seki Toshihiko, and other voice actors.
- Shinsengumi M/K Wasurenagusa (as Saitou Hajime)
- Seventh Heaven (as Itsuki)
- ALICE=ALICE (as the Cheshire Cat)
- Bad Medicine -Infectious Teachers-' (as Kazuha Kakeru)
- Oz to Himitsu no Ai (The fourth key: Shian )
- MARGINAL#4 (as Aiba Rui)
- Soubou Sangokushi (as Kakou Ton Xiahou Dun)
- Midnight Jiang Shis (as Rinrin)
- Exit Tunes Presents ACTORS franchise (as Shido Minori)

== Discography ==
=== Albums and Singles with Koei Music ===
- ~ Kiss You ~ EP: "Kiss You" / Alive / Stay / Kiss You Additional Private Session 2000 (Released 3/21/2002)
- Rainy Day / Skylight no Sora (Released 10/23/2002)
- A to Z (Released 12/11/2002)
- Kimi ni Aete Yokatta (Released 7/23/2003)

=== Albums with Realize Records ===
- INDICATE (Released 5/26/2004)
- scene ~Nokoshitai Fuukei~ (Released 8/5/2005)
- ism (Released 6/2/2006)
- one (Released 11/28/2007)
- ColorS [Standard and Special Editions] (Released 7/7/2009)
- infinity (Released 8/18/2010)
- MA-X (Released 9/28/2010)
- PLUS+ (Released 12/19/2012)
- Voice Rendezvous (Released 6/11/2014)
- Juicys (Released 2/22/2017)
- amorous (Released 7/18/2018)

=== Singles with Realize Records ===
- Keep on Dancin' (Released 4/21/2004)
- Itooshikute (Released 8/18/2004)
- hEAVEN (Promotion for h.Naoto – Released 11/26/2005)
- OK! (Released 3/24/2006)
- Gold Goal (Released 7/7/2006)
- Muteki na Smike (Released 8/9/2006)
- Ashita no Kioku (Released 10/25/2006)
- Te no Hira / Kimi to... (Released 6/20/2007)
- PE∀CE (Released 7/18/2007)
- Kaze ni Natte / Moshimo... (Released 2/6/2008)
- Palette [Standard and Limited Editions] (Released 9/24/2008)
- Time Capsule / Aruite Kaerou [Standard and Limited Editions] (Released 2/25/2009)
- Rashinban [Standard and Limited Editions] (Released 2/10/2010)
- Yumekibo Ressha [Standard and Limited Editions] (Released 12/8/2010)
- one on one [Standard and Limited Editions] (Released 8/25/2011)
- Taisetsu na Kimi (Released 2/1/2012)
- Karakuru / Subuta ni Pineapple ~Shakai Ninben (Released 2/8/2013)
- Fuurai Boukyou / Boueikyou (Released 9/17/2014)
- PON PON KING / BLUE [Standard and Limited Editions] (Released 1/13/2016)
- TRICK / AGAIN [Standard and Limited Editions] (Released 1/13/2016)
- MOB / MayQ [Standard and Limited Editions] (Released 1/13/2016)
- AXIS / GOBU/GOBU [Standard and Limited Editions] (Released 1/13/2016)

=== Compilation albums ===
- Decade Gold -Naozumi Takahashi 10th Anniversary BEST- (Released 10/10/2012)
- Decade Silver -Naozumi Takahashi 10th Anniversary BEST- (Released 10/10/2012)
