= Katsuyuki Konishi =

Japanese voice actor

- 小西 克幸
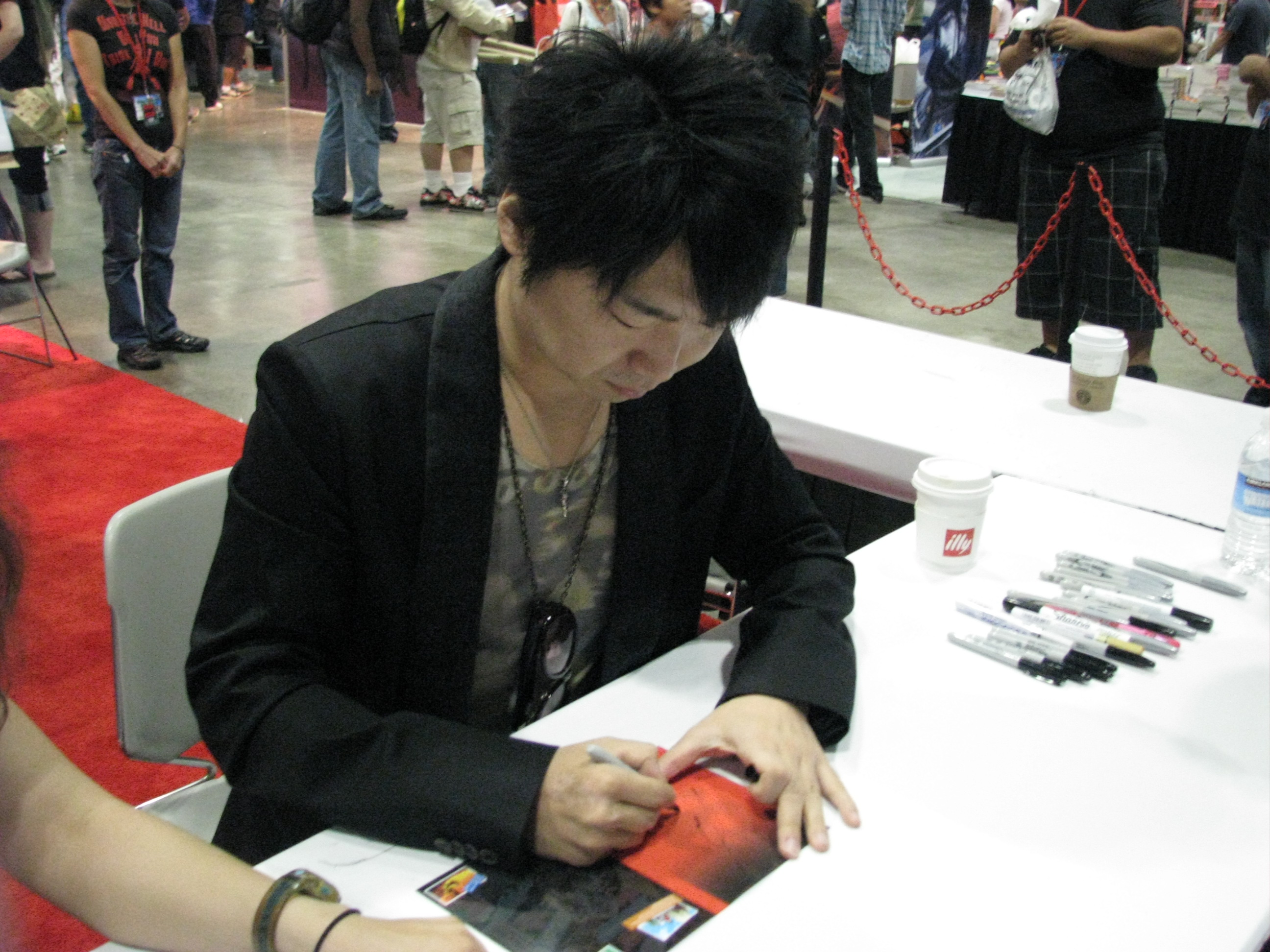
- Konishi at Anime Expo, 2010
- Born: Wakayama, Wakayama, Japan
- Other name: Konitan (こにたん)
- Occupation: Voice actor
- Years active: 1996–present
- Agent: Ken Production
- Notable work: Tengen Toppa Gurren Lagann as Kamina; Tales of Symphonia as Lloyd Irving; Fairy Tail as Laxus Dreyar; Beelzebub as Tatsumi Oga; Akame ga Kill! as Bulat; One Punch Man as Tanktop Master; Bleach as Keigo Asano and Shuhei Hisagi; JoJo's Bizarre Adventure: Golden Wind as Diavolo; Transformers: Energon as Optimus Prime; Demon Slayer: Kimetsu no Yaiba as Tengen Uzui; Kill La Kill as Tsumugu Kinagase; Black Clover as Fuegoleon Vermilion; Deca-Dence as Kaburagi; The King of Braves GaoGaiGar as Volfogg/Big Volfogg; Gachiakuta as Enjin; Fire Force as Takeru Noto; Samurai Deeper Kyo as Kyoshiro Mibu; Blood+ as Haji; Hetalia: Axis Powers as America; Honkai: Star Rail as Boothill

Katsuyuki Konishi (小西 克幸, Konishi Katsuyuki) is a Japanese voice actor from Wakayama, Japan. He is affiliated with Ken Production. His debut role was Volfogg/Big Volfogg in GaoGaiGar. He is most well known for portraying Kamina in Gurren Lagann, Laxus Dreyar in Fairy Tail and Tanktop Master in One Punch Man. In the early 2000s until the year 2008 he gave the voice to Phoenix Ikki in Saint Seiya throughout the Hades Saga. He is also known for voicing two characters, Keigo Asano and Shuhei Hisagi, both from Bleach. Konishi also voiced Diavolo from JoJo's Bizarre Adventure: Golden Wind, Jonathan Joestar from the Phantom Blood film, and Tengen Uzui from Demon Slayer: Kimetsu no Yaiba.

He was the special guest at the 2010 Anime Expo in Los Angeles, USA, where he met his fans and revealed that his favorite anime character was Kamina from Tengen Toppa Gurren Lagann; also adding that each character whom he voiced is important to him. Konishi was awarded the Best Supporting Actor Award in the 9th Annual Seiyu Awards on March 6, 2015.

== Filmography ==
=== Television animation ===
Year	Title	Role	Notes	Reference
1997	The King of Braves GaoGaiGar	VolFogg	debut role	
1997	Pocket Monsters	Raizō, Satoshi's Kentauros, Katsura's Boober, Dr. Akihabara's Porygon and additional voices		
1997	Case Closed	Minoru Ogata, Akira Hojima, Ryuji Mizuhara, Kitada, Morimura, Sonsaku Tsujiei		
1998	Bakusō Kyōdai Let's & Go!!	Masao		
1998	Sexy Commando Gaiden: Sugoi yo!! Masaru-san	Matsui		
1998	Cardcaptor Sakura	Spinel Sun (big), Yoshiyuki Terada (season 3)		
1998	Ojarumaru	Go Hiromu		
1998	Seiho Bukyo Outlaw Star	Mikey		
1999	Dai-Guard	Shinya Yokozawa, Hirotaka Ijuin		
1999	Pocket Monsters: Episode Orange Archipelago	Satoshi's Kentauros, Satoshi's Kabigon, Yūji's Kairyu, and additional voices		
1999	Pocket Monsters: Episode Gold & Silver	Raiden, Akito, Daizō, Satoshi's Kentauros, Satoshi's Kabigon, Satoshi's Heracros, Wataru's Kairyu, Shigeru's Hassam, Tsukushi's Strike, Yamato's Delvil, Kairyu (ep, 253) and additional voices		
2000	Ceres, Celestial Legend	Tooya		
2000	Hand Maid May	Dye-Dye Green (ep 6), Hiroshi Daimon		
2001	Touch: Cross Road	Brian		
2001	Dennou Boukenki Webdiver	Wyvarian, Garyun, Franberg H. Jacquard		
2001	Zone of the Enders	Sean		
2001	Shaman King	Amidamaru, Luchist Lasso, Blamuro		
2001	Geisters: Fractions of the Earth	Victor Tekius		
2001	Hikaru no Go	Hiroyuki Ashiwara		
2001	The Prince of Tennis	Takahisa Kajimoto		
2001	Hellsing	Mason Fox		
2001	Rune Soldier	Louie		
2001	Zaion: I Wish You Were Here	Kaneshiro		
2002	Full Metal Panic!	Satoru Shirai		
2002	Aquarian Age	Shingo Hirota		
2002	Rockman EXE	Kenichi Hino, MagicMan		
2002	Magical Shopping Arcade Abenobashi	Kohei, Masayuki Asahina (young)		
2002	Tokyo Mew Mew	Michelle (ep 29), Shintaro Momomiya		
2002	Digimon Frontier	Koji's Father, Piddomon		
2002	Samurai Deeper Kyo	Kyoshiro Mibu, Demon Eyes Kyo		
2002	Asobotto Senki Goku	Jetaime		
2002	Heat Guy J	Mitchal Rubenstein		
2002	Duel Masters	Knight		
2002	Tsuri Baka Nisshi	Yusuke So		
2002	Pocket Monsters: Advanced Generation	Robert, Izaki, Dee Dunstan, Satoshi's Kentauros, Satoshi's Kabigon, Satoshi's Heracros, Satoshi's Heigani, Satoshi's Onigohri, Kojirō's Sabonea, Haruka's Bursyamo, Harley's Ariados, Rocket-dan's Delibird, and additional voices		
2002	Pocket Monsters Side Stories	Takumi, Satoshi's Kentauros, Satoshi's Kabigon, Satoshi's Heracros		
2002	Weiß Kreuz Glühen	Berger		
2003	Shutsugeki! Machine Robo Rescue	Junichi Mizushima		
2003	Getbackers	Shunsuke Akutsu (eps 6–8), Toshiki Uryu		
2003	Crush Gear Nitro	Muto		
2003	Air Master	Yoshinori Konishi		
2003	Stellvia	Clark Commander		
2003	Bōken Yūki Pluster World	Might V		
2003	Dear Boys	Kenji Dobashi		
2003	Croquette!	Shibasuke, Ganmo, Gyuutan, Wasabi, Muffin Box		
2003	Scrapped Princess	Fulle		
2003	Tantei Gakuen Q	Obayashi Kazuki		
2003	Papuwa	Maka		
2003	Avenger	Garcia		
2003	Rockman EXE Axess	BrightMan		
2003	Bobobo-bo Bo-bobo	Kanemaru, Tarashi (ep 2)		
2004	Transformers: Energon	Grand Convoy (Optimus Prime), Overdrive (Cliffjumper)		
2004	Gokusen	Shinohara		
2004	SD Gundam Force	Ashuramaru		
2004	Monkey Turn	Yuusuke Enoki		
2004	Daphne in the Brilliant Blue	Giro		
2004	Kyo Kara Maoh!	Shori Shibuya		
2004	Duel Masters Charge	Night		
2004	Samurai Champloo	Daikichi	Episode 7	
2004	Monkey Turn V	Yusuke Enoki		
2004	Agatha Christie no Meitantei Poirot to Marple	Mr. Robinson	Episode 2	
2004	Galaxy Angel X	Kabao	Episode 20	
2004	Onmyou Taisenki	Taika no Yatarou, Souma no Chichi, Genbu no Ganzou		
2004	Rockman EXE Stream	Kenichi Hino, MagicMan, BrightMan		
2004	Zoids Fuzors	Rasutani		
2004	Samurai Gun	Daimon		
2004	Bleach	Keigo Asano, Shuhei Hisagi		
2005	Yakitate!! Japan	Carn		
2005	Aquarion	Shilha		
2005	MÄR	Ash, Jupiter		
2005	The Law of Ueki	Onimon		
2005	Loveless	Agatsuma Sobi		
2005	Best Student Council	Shimon Kurisu		
2005	Brave King GaoGaiGar Final Grand Glorious Gathering	Volfogg		
2005	Trinity Blood	Radu Barvon		
2005	Guyver: The Bioboosted Armor	Agito Makishima/Guyver III		
2005	Gunparade Orchestra	Shion Ryuuzouji		
2005	Shakugan no Shana	Merihim/Shiro		
2005	Immortal Grand Prix	Ricardo Montajio		
2005	Black Cat	Zaguine Axeloke		
2005	My-Otome	Sergay Wáng		
2005	Blood+	Haji		
2005	Karin	Kenta Usui		
2006	Pocket Monsters: Diamond and Pearl	Satoshi's Kabigon, Satoshi's Heracros, Satoshi's Heigani, Satoshi's Onigohri, Satoshi's Mukuhawk, Satoshi's Gliger/Glion, Takeshi's Gregguru, Haruka's Bursyamo, Haruka's Kameil, Kojirou's Sabonea, Shirona's Gaburias, J's Bohmander, Team Rocket's Delibird, Jun's Emperte, Kazunari's Alligates, Marble's Rentorar, Maximum Mask's Flowsel, Jun's Heracros, Jun's Airmd, and additional voices		
2006	Galaxy Angel Rune	Kuhen Bahm		
2006	La Corda D'Oro	Shinobu Osaki		
2006	Tokimeki Memorial Only Love	Ryoichi Kamino		
2006	Shonen Onmyouji	Guren		
2006	D.Gray-man	Komui Lee		
2007	Shattered Angels	Kyoshiro Ayanokoji		
2007	Hayate the Combat Butler	Kaede Nonohara/ Mr.Aizawa		
2007	Tengen Toppa Gurren Lagann	Kamina		
2007	Gegege no Kitarō	Azuki-arai, Dracula the 3rd, Kasa-Bake (1st), Shu no bon, Godou-Tenrin-Ou (ep 88), Gokan-Ou (ep 7), Kawa-Otoko (eps 42, 82)		
2007	Engage Planet Kiss Dum	Masaki		
2007	Oh! Edo Rocket	Genzou, Kazuki Nakashima, Knee		
2007	Polyphonica	Psyche Renbart		
2007	Kishin Taisen Gigantic Formula	Hasan Papas		
2007	Kaze no Stigma	Irwin Leszal		
2007	Devil May Cry	Simon		
2007	Potemayo	Matsuichi Kasugano, Takeji Kasugano, Umezo Kasugano		
2007	Bamboo Blade	Toraji Ishida		
2007	Suteki Tantei Labyrinth	Ryūsuke Inogami		
2007	Mobile Suit Gundam 00	Johann Trinity		
2007	Moyashimon	Kaoru Misato		
2008	Rental Magica	Sekiren		
2008	Kyo kara Maoh! 3rd Series	Shōri Shibuya		
2008	Macross Frontier	Ozma Lee		
2008	Monochrome Factor	Kō		
2008	Sekirei	Kaoru Seo		
2008	Blade of the Immortal	Eiku Shizuma		
2008	Skip Beat!	Ren Tsuruga		
2008	Tytania	Fan Hulic		
2008	Negibōzu no Asatarō	Hansuke		
2009	Kurokami The Animation	Reishin		
2009	Samurai Harem	Ukyo Saginomiya		
2009	Basquash!	Slash (young)		
2009	Hayate the Combat Butler!!	Kaede Nonohara, Mr. Aizawa		
2009	Polyphonica Crimson S	Psyche Renbart		
2009	Dragon Ball Kai	Captain Ginyu		
2009	Sōten Kōro	Li Tong		
2009	GA Geijutsuka Art Design Class	Uozumi		
2009	Hetalia: Axis Powers	America, Canada		
2009	A Certain Scientific Railgun	Wataru Kurozuma		
2009	The Book of Bantorra	Yukizona		
2009	Tegami Bachi: Letter Bee	Largo Lloyd		
2009	Tamagotchi!	Gotchiman, Narrator		
2009	Fairy Tail	Laxus Dreyar		
2009	Welcome to Irabu's Office	Arai		
2010	Okamikakushi	Miyuki Washiu		
2010	Durarara!!	Tom Tanaka		
2010	Hanamaru Kindergarten	The Boss		
2010	Sekirei: Pure Engagement	Kaoru Seo		
2010	Tegami Bachi: Reverse	Largo Lloyd		
2010	Togainu no Chi	Kiriwari		
2010	Tantei Opera Milky Holmes	Pero		
2011	Beelzebub	Tatsumi Oga		
2011	Duel Masters Victory	Narrator		
2011	Marvel Anime: X-Men	Kōichi Kaga		
2011	Toriko	Tengu Buranchi (ep 129-), Uumen Umeda		
2011	Sacred Seven	Yūji Kenmi		
2011	Nura: Rise of the Yokai Clan: Demon Capital	Ryūji Keikain		
2011	Maji de Watashi ni Koi Shinasai!	Shoichi Kazama		
2011	Shakugan no Shana III	Merihim a.k.a. Shiro		
2011	Sekai-ichi Hatsukoi	Masamune Takano		
2011	Last Exile: Fam, The Silver Wing	Kayvān		
2012	Natsume's Book of Friends	Natsume's Father		
2012	Amagami SS+	Inago Mask		
2012	Daily Lives of High School Boys	Chuo High Student Council Vice President		
2012	Saint Seiya Omega	Lionet Sōma		
2012	Medaka Box	Mahibi Moji		
2012	Polar Bear's Café	Full Time Panda, Adélie Penguin		
2012	Pocket Monsters: Best Wishes! Season 2	Shirona's Gaburias		
2012	Phi Brain	Whist		
2012	Jormungand	R		
2012	Inazuma Eleven GO 2: Chrono Stone	Zanark		
2012	Hyouka	Takeo Kaitō		
2012	Moyashimon Returns	Kaoru Misato		
2012	Ixion Saga DT	Adjutant Konitan		
2012	Jormungand Perfect Order	R		
2012	Initial D: Fifth Stage	Hideo Minagawa		
2013	Hetalia: The Beautiful World	America, Canada		
2013	Haganai NEXT	Hayato Hasegawa		
2013	Problem Children are Coming from Another World, aren't they?	Mandra		
2013	Karneval	Tokitatsu		
2013	Gargantia on the Verdurous Planet	Pinion		
2013	Arata Kangatari	Ohika		
2013	Cardfight!! Vanguard	Osamu Kishida		
2013	Danganronpa: The Animation	Daiya Ōwada		
2013	Mushibugyō	Mushikari Leader		
2013	Valvrave the Liberator	Delius Wartenberg		
2013	Silver Spoon	Shingo Hachiken		
2013	Diabolik Lovers	Reiji Sakamaki		
2013	Gaist Crusher	Volcan		
2013	Tanken Driland	Desmonos		
2013	Kill la Kill	Tsumugu Kinagase, Guts		
2013	Phi Brain: Kami no Puzzle	Hoist		
2013	Pocket Monsters: Best Wishes! Season 2: Decolora Adventure	Satoshi's Kentauros		
2014	D-Frag!	Kenji Kazama		
2014	Strange+	Mera		
2014	Wizard Barristers: Benmashi Cecil	Shizumu Ekusou		
2014	Hozuki's Coolheadedness	Beelzebub	Episodes 6, 12	
2014	La Corda d'Oro Blue Sky	Ritsu Kisaragi		
2014	Majin Bone	Dark Gryphon		
2014	Tokyo Ghoul	Kōtarō Amon		
2014	Akame ga Kill!	Bulat		
2014	Haikyū!!	Hiroki Kurokawa		
2014	Mobile Suit Gundam-san	Char-san		
2014	The Seven Deadly Sins	Dreyfus		
2014	Bonjour♪Sweet Love Patisserie	Ibuki Aoi		
2015	Cute High Earth Defense Club Love!	Wario Hashida		
2015	Durarara!!x2	Tom Tanaka		
2015	Diabolik Lovers: More, Blood	Sakamaki Reiji		
2015	The Heroic Legend of Arslan	Shapur, Esfan		
2015	The Rolling Girls	Shutendōji		
2015	Tokyo Ghoul √A	Kōtarō Amon		
2015	Prison School	Takehito "Gakuto" Morokuzu		
2015	Snow White with the Red Hair	Sakaki		
2015	Rampo Kitan: Game of Laplace	Keisuke Kagami		
2015	One-Punch Man	Tank Top Master		
2015	Ninja Slayer From Animation	Buster Tetsuo		
2015	Hokuto no Ken: Ichigo Aji	Kenshiro		
2015	Ushio and Tora	Kuin		
2016	Gate: Jieitai Kano Chi nite, Kaku Tatakaeri	Zorzal El Caesar		
2016	Magi: Adventure of Sinbad	Badr		
2016	Snow White with the Red Hair 2nd Season	Sakaki		
2016	Fairy Tail Zero	Yuri Dreyar		
2016	Heavy Object	Prizewell City Slicker		
2016	Onigiri	Narrator		
2016	Cheer Boys!!	Gen Hasegawa		
2016	One Piece	Sheepshead		
2016	Rin-ne	Refuto	Episode 34	
2016	Kuromukuro	Arthur Graham		
2016	Fate/kaleid liner Prisma Illya 3rei!!	Darius Ainsworth	Episodes 3, 5–6, 8-10	
2016	Days	Katsutoshi Nakazawa		
2016	Twin Star Exorcists	Kengo Ujii		
2016	Magic-kyun Renaissance	Chieri Tōdō		
2017	Sakura Quest	Takamizawa		
2017	Altair: A Record of Battles	Süleyman		
2017	Blue Exorcist: Kyoto Saga	Shima Jūzō		
2017	Black Clover	Fuegoleon Vermillion		
2017	The Royal Tutor	Café Owner		
2017	Mahōjin Guru Guru	Udberg Eldol/Kita Kita Oyaji	Episodes 1–5, 7–10, 13-	
2017	Puri-Puri Chiichan	Fukkun	Episode 16	
2017	Dive!!	Keisuke Fujitani		
2018-2023	Idolish7	Sousuke Yaotome	Also in Second Beat and Third Beat	
2018	Kakuriyo no Yadomeshi	Ōdanna		
2018	Killing Bites	Ryūji Shiina		
2018	Darling in the Franxx	Hachi		
2018	The Seven Deadly Sins: Revival of the Commandments	Dreyfus and Fraudrin		
2018	Hozuki's Coolheadedness 2	Beelzebub	Episode 20	
2018	Dorei-ku The Animation	Ataru Chuuou		
2018	Captain Tsubasa	Roberto Hongo		
2018	Food Wars! Shokugeki no Souma: The Third Plate	Soumei Saito		
2018	Isekai Izakaya "Nobu"	Berthold		
2018	Grand Blue	Ryujiro Kotobuki		
2018	Golden Kamuy	Second Lieutenant Koito		
2019	JoJo's Bizarre Adventure: Golden Wind	Diavolo / King Crimson		
2019	One-Punch Man 2	Tank Top Master		
2019	Star-Myu: High School Star Musical 3	Takafumi Chiaki		
2019	To the Abandoned Sacred Beasts	Hank Henriette / Ritsuto Han		
2019	Fire Force	Takeru Noto		
2019	BEM	Bem		
2019	Kengan Ashura	Naoya Okubo		
2019	Demon Slayer: Kimetsu no Yaiba	Tengen Uzui		
2019	Ahiru no Sora	Chiaki Hanazono		
2019	Kemono Michi: Rise Up	Genzō Shibata / Kemona Mask		
2019	Case File nº221: Kabukicho	Sherlock Holmes		
2019	Food Wars! Shokugeki no Souma: The Fourth Plate	Soumei Saito		
2020	Arte	Leo		
2020	Deca-Dence	Kaburagi		
2020	No Guns Life 2	Edmund Baker		
2020	Magatsu Wahrheit -Zuerst-	Professor Radovaud		
2020	The Misfit of Demon King Academy	Elio Ludowell		
2020	Wandering Witch: The Journey of Elaina	Young King		
2021	Sorcerous Stabber Orphen: Battle of Kimluck	Lapointe		
2021	World Trigger Season 2	Tatsuhito Ikoma		
2021	Shaman King (2021)	Amidamaru, John Denbat		
2021	Full Dive	Ginji		
2021	Backflip!!	Tōru Takase		
2021	Welcome to Demon School! Iruma-kun Season 2	Shichirou Balam		
2021	The Dungeon of Black Company	Kinji Ninomiya		
2021	The Faraway Paladin	Blood		
2021	Demon Slayer: Kimetsu no Yaiba – Entertainment District Arc	Tengen Uzui		
2022	Orient	Jisai Kanemaki		
2022	Arifureta: From Commonplace to World's Strongest 2nd Season	Freid Bagwa		
2022	Summer Time Rendering	Masahito Karikiri		
2022	Shinobi no Ittoki	Tokisada Kaga		
2022	Blue Lock	Jyubei Aryu		
2022	Eternal Boys	Naoki Ishida		
2022	Urusei Yatsura	Rei		
2022	Bleach: Thousand-Year Blood War	Shuhei Hisagi		
2023	The Tale of the Outcasts	Marbas		
2023	Reborn to Master the Blade: From Hero-King to Extraordinary Squire	The Black Masked Man		
2023	Kaina of the Great Snow Sea	Olinoga		
2023	Opus Colors	Rio Nakashizu		
2023	The Masterful Cat Is Depressed Again Today	Kaoru Orizuka		
2023	Helck	Helck		
2023	Firefighter Daigo: Rescuer in Orange	Daigo Asahina		
2023	The Family Circumstances of the Irregular Witch	Pond		
2023	Overtake!	Kōya Madoka		
2023	Bikkuri-Men	Maris		
2023	The Apothecary Diaries	Gaoshun		
2024	Shaman King: Flowers	Amidamaru		
2024	Brave Bang Bravern!	Segnitis		
2024	Mission: Yozakura Family	Kyōichirō Yozakura		
2024	Demon Slayer: Kimetsu no Yaiba – Hashira Training Arc	Tengen Uzui		
2024	The Ossan Newbie Adventurer	Kelvin Urwolf		
2024	The Elusive Samurai	Ashikaga Takauji		
2024	Kinnikuman: Perfect Origin Arc	Robin Mask, Iwao		
2024	No Longer Allowed in Another World	Tuxedo Man		
2024	Delico's Nursery	Gerhard Fra		
2024	Tower of God 2nd Season	Ha Jinsung		
2024	Orb: On the Movements of the Earth	Oczy		
2024	Yakuza Fiancé: Raise wa Tanin ga Ii	Taketo Hotei		
2025	Babanba Banban Vampire	Umetarō Sakamoto		
2025	Mashin Creator Wataru	Offline		
2025	Yaiba: Samurai Legend	Kenjūrō Kurogane		
2025	Umamusume: Cinderella Gray	Jō Kitahara		
2025	Witch Watch	Reiji Otogi		
2025	The Mononoke Lecture Logs of Chuzenji-sensei	Akihiko Chuzenji		
2025	Me and the Alien MuMu	Junichirō Anamori		
2025	Necronomico and the Cosmic Horror Show	Ghatanothoa		
2025	Gachiakuta	Enjin		
2025	Ninja vs. Gokudo	Kiwami Kimura		
2025	Fate/strange Fake	Hansa Cervantes		
2025	Tojima Wants to Be a Kamen Rider	Tanzaburo Tojima		
2025	Backstabbed in a Backwater Dungeon	Jack		
2025	The Apothecary Diaries Season 2	Gaoshun		
2026	Yoroi-Shinden Samurai Troopers	Ramaga		
2026	High School! Kimengumi	Takuma Sessa, Wakazō Temekono		
2026	Petals of Reincarnation	Xiang Yu		
2026	Killed Again, Mr. Detective?	Kaoruta Sozorogi		
2026	Witch Hat Atelier	Dagda		
2026	The World Is Dancing	Kan'ami		
2026	Kaiju Girl Caramelise	Kotaro Hibino		
2026	Mao	Daigo		
2026	The Apothecary Diaries Season 3 (part 1)	Gaoshun		
2026	Dandivine	Yūsaku Kuroiwa		
2026	Suikoden: The Anime	Viktor		
2026	Reincarnated as a Sword	Varuza		
2027	Kagurabachi	Togo Shiba		
TBA	Millennium Family	Hayden		

=== Drama CDs ===
Year	Title	Role	Notes	Reference
2004	7 SEEDS I NATSU NO SHOU	Semimaru Asai		
2004	7 SEEDS II NATSU NO SHOU	Semimaru Asai		
2004	Tales of Symphonia: A Long Time Ago	Lloyd Irving		
2004	Pyū to Fuku! Jaguar	Hammer		
2005	High School Debut	Fumiya Tamura		
2007	Only the Ring Finger Knows 4	Kazuki Shohei		
2007	Me & My Brothers	Takeshi Miyashita		
2007	Pandora Hearts	Gilbert Nightray/Raven		
2008	Tales of Symphonia: Rodeo Ride Tour	Lloyd Irving		
2008	Hetalia: Axis Powers	America		
2009	Nurarihyon no Mago: Sennen Makyou	Ryuji Keikain	Character CD Series (Ryuji Keikain & Akifusa Keikain) Special Drama Track	
2009	Shin Megami Tensei: Devil Survivor	Kamiya Eiji		
2010	Sekai-ichi Hatsukoi 4 ~Onodera Ritsu no Baai + Yoshino Chiaki no Baai	Masamune Takano/Saga		
2012	Sekai-ichi Hatsukoi Wonderful LOVE Year! Phase 1	Masamune Takano/Saga		
2012	Diabolik Lovers: Another Situation ～Whispering in Your Ear~	Sakamaki Reiji		
2012	Diabolik Lovers: Sakamaki Kyoudai☆Test Battle Breaks!	Sakamaki Reiji		
2012	Diabolik Lovers: Yoruno! Taiikusai★Kaisai	Sakamaki Reiji		
2013	Diabolik Lovers: Odessa no Noroi ～Oitsumerareshi Vampire Tachi～	Sakamaki Reiji		
2013	Diabolik Lovers: Karei Naru Shitsuji Kissae no Michi ～La・Vienna・Rose～	Sakamaki Reiji		

=== Original video animation (OVA) ===
Year	Title	Role	Notes	Reference
2000	The King of Braves GaoGaiGar Final	VolFogg		
2000	Refrain Blue	Matsunaga Yoshihiro		
2003	Tenchi Muyo! Ryo Ohki OAV 3	Sorunaru		
2003	Saint Seiya: The Hades Chapter - Sanctuary	Capella of Auriga		
2004	Night Shift Nurses	Dr. Sekigawa		
2005	Saint Seiya: The Hades Chapter - Inferno	Phoenix Ikki		
2006	TANK S.W.A.T. 01	Habana		
2007	Kyo Kara Maoh! R	Shouri Shibuya		
2008	Saint Seiya: The Hades Chapter - Elysion	Phoenix Ikki		
2008	Mobile Suit Gundam MS IGLOO 2: The Gravity Front	Rayban Surat		
2010	Beelzebub	Tatsumi Oga		
2010	H.H.H Triple Ecchi	Miyuki's father		
2011	Sekai-ichi Hatsukoi	Masamune Takano		
2012	Fairy Tail Memory Days	Laxus Dreyar		
2014	Magi: Sinbad no Bouken	Badr		
2015	Diabolik Lovers	Sakamaki Reiji		
2016	Tenchi Muyo! Ryo-Ohki	Nobuyuki Masaki	OVA 4	
2024	Code Geass: Rozé of the Recapture	Isao Monobe		

=== Original net animation (ONA) ===
Year	Title	Role
2006	The King of Fighters: Another Day	Maxima
2015	Kare Baka	Piisuke Kurosaki
2016	Monster Strike	Taiyou Shirahama
2019	7 Seeds	Semimaru Asai
2019	Knights of the Zodiac: Saint Seiya	Phoenix Ikki
2021	Oshiete Hokusai!: The Animation	Raijin
2021	Hetalia: World Stars	America, Canada
2023	Record of Ragnarok II	Heracles
2023	Onimusha	Heikuro
2024	Rising Impact	Kai Todoin
2025	Cat's Eye	Masato Kamiya

=== Theatrical animation ===
Year	Title	Role	Reference
1999	Pikachu's Rescue Adventure	Paras	
1999	Pocket Monsters the Movie - Mirage Pokémon: Lugia's Explosive Birth	Thunder	
2000	Pikachu and Pichu	Koratta	
2000	Cardcaptor Sakura Movie 2: The Sealed Card	Yoshiyuki Terada	
2001	Pocket Monsters the Movie - Celebi: Encounter Beyond Time	Vicious's Hassam	
2004	Pocket Monsters Advanced Generation the Movie - Sky-Splitting Visitor: Deoxys	Satoshi's Heigani, Rayquaza	
2005	Pocket Monsters Advanced Generation the Movie - Mew and the Wave Hero: Lucario	Satoshi's Heigani, Kojirō's Sabonea	
2006	Pocket Monsters Advanced Generation the Movie - Pokémon Ranger and the Prince of the Sea: Manaphy	Satoshi's Heigani	
2007	JoJo's Bizarre Adventure: Phantom Blood	Jonathan Joestar	
2007	Pocket Monsters Diamond & Pearl the Movie - Dialga VS Palkia VS Darkrai	Takeshi's Gureggru	
2007	Naruto Shippuden	Setsuna	
2007	Bleach: The DiamondDust Rebellion	Shūhei Hisagi	
2008	Gurren Lagann the Movie, The Lights in the Sky Are Stars	Kamina	
2008	Pocket Monsters Diamond & Pearl the Movie - Giratina and the Sky's Bouquet: Shaymin	Satoshi's Glion, Takeshi's Gureggru	
2008	Bleach: Fade to Black	Shuuhei Hisagi	
2008	Gegege no Kitarō: Nippon Bakuretsu!!	Arai Azuki	
2009	Pocket Monsters Diamond & Pearl the Movie - Arceus: To a Conquering Spacetime	Satoshi's Mukuhawk, Satoshi's Glion, Takeshi's Gureggru	
2010	Pocket Monsters Diamond & Pearl the Movie - Supreme Ruler of Illusions: Zoroark	Takeshi's Gureggur, Raikou	
2010	Bleach: Hell Verse	Keigo Asano	
2011	Macross Frontier: Sayonara no Tsubasa	Ozma Lee	
2011	Alice in the Country of Hearts: Wonderful Wonder World	Blood Dupre	
2012	Fuse Teppō Musume no Torimonochō	Dousetsu	
2014	Sekai-ichi Hatsukoi: Yokozawa Takafumi no Baai	Masamune Takano	
2017	Crayon Shin-chan: Invasion!! Alien Shiriri	Yao	
2019	Promare	Meis	
2020	My Tyrano: Together, Forever		
2020	BEM: Become Human	Bem	
2022	Mobile Suit Gundam: Cucuruz Doan's Island	Staff officer	
2022	Backflip!!	Tōru Takase	
2023	Gridman Universe	Max	
2023	Rakudai Majo: Fūka to Yami no Majo	Lloyd	
2023	Gekijōban Collar × Malice Deep Cover	Mitsuru Sowa	
2025	Virgin Punk: Clockwork Girl	Mr. Elegance	
2025	Demon Slayer: Kimetsu no Yaiba – The Movie: Infinity Castle	Tengen Uzui	

=== Video games ===
Year	Title	Role	Notes	Reference
1999	The Last Blade	Keiichiro Washizuka		
1999	Captain Love	Kumon Serizawa		
1999	The King of Fighters '99	Maxima		
2000	The King of Fighters 2000	Maxima		
2001	The King of Fighters 2001	Maxima		
2001	Goemon: Shin Sedai Shūmei!	Kojiro		
2002	Kaitou Apricot	So Mochizuki		
2002	The King of Fighters 2002	Maxima		
2003	Venus & Braves	Red, Melvin		
2003	Mega Man Network Transmission	BrightMan		
2003	Kin'iro no Corda	Shinobu Osaki		
2003	Tales of Symphonia	Lloyd Irving		
2003	Gakuen Heaven: Boy's Love Scramble	Tetsuya Niwa		
2003	The King of Fighters 2003	Maxima		
2004	Inuyasha: The Secret of the Cursed Mask	Utsugi		
2004	Shaman King: Spirit Funbari	Amidamaru		
2004	Monkey Turn V	Yusuke Enoki		
2004	ZOIDS VS. III	Rasutani		
2005	The Wings of Rean	Captain Kairaku		
2005	The King of Fighters XI	Maxima		
2006	Baten Kaitos II	Fuse		
2006	Shakugan no Shana	Merihimu		
2006	Gunparade Orchestra: Midori no Shou	Shion Ryuzoji		
2006	Gunparade Orchestra: Ao no Shou	Shion Ryuzoji		
2006	.hack//G.U.	Sakaki		
2006	Arabians Lost: The Engagement on Desert	Tyrone Vail		
2006	Blood+: One Night Kiss	Haji		
2006	Blood+: Final Piece	Haji		
2006	Summon Night 4	Subaru		
2006	Yoake Mae Yori Ruriiro na: Brighter than Dawning Blue	Sawajin Takami		
2006	Tales of the World: Radiant Mythology	Lloyd Irving		
2007	Saint Seiya: The Hades	Phoenix Ikki		
2007	D.Gray-man: Kami no Shitotachi	Komui Lee		
2007	Eternal Sonata	Crescendo		
2007	Reijou Tantei Office no Jikenbo	Kaijin Mikage		
2007	Tales of Fandom Vol.2	Lloyd Irving		
2007	Shounen Onmyouji: Tsubasa Yoima, Ten e Kaere	Guren		
2007	Gurren Lagann	Kamina		
2007	Assassin's Creed	Altair Ibn La Ahad		
2007	Samurai Warriors 2 Xtreme Legends	Toshiie Maeda		
2008	Your Memories Off: Girl's Style	Kuta		
2008	Mobile Suit Gundam 00	Johann Trinity		
2008	Warriors Orochi 2	Toshiie Maeda		
2008	Tales of Symphonia: Dawn of the New World	Lloyd Irving		
2008	Zero: Tsukihami no Kamen	Choshiro Kirishima		
2008	D.Gray-man: Sousha no Shikaku	Komui Lee		
2008	Macross Ace Frontier	Ozuma Lee		
2008	Mobile Suit Gundam 00 Gundam Meisters			
2008	Monochrome Factor Cross Road	Ko		
2008	Blazer Drive	Jonathan		
2008	Suikoden Tierkreis	Dirk		
2008	Togainu no Chi: True Blood	Kiriwari		
2008	Fushigi Yūgi: Suzaku Ibun	Hotohori		
2009	Tales of the World: Radiant Mythology 2	Lloyd Irving		
2009	Tales of VS.	Lloyd Irving		
2009	Killzone 2	Thomas Cebu Sebuchenko		
2009	Bamboo Blade: Sorekara no Chousen	Toraji Ishida		
2009	Arc Rise Fantasia	Sage		
2009	Ookamikakushi	Miyuki Washuu		
2009	Macross Ultimate Frontier	Ozuma Lee		
2009	Dragon Ball Raging Blast	Ginyu		
2009	Warriors Orochi Z	Toshiie Maeda		
2009	Samurai Warriors 3	Toshiie Maeda		
2009	Initial D Arcade Stage 5	Hideo Minagawa		
2010	Kin'iro no Corda 3	Shinobu Osaki		
2010	Fist of the North Star: Ken's Rage	Kenshiro		
2010	No More Heroes: Heroes' Paradise	Henry		
2010	The King of Fighters XIII	Maxima		
2010	GA: Geijutsuka Art Design Class -Slapstick Wonderland-	Uozumi		
2010	Another Century's Episode: R	Ozuma		
2010	Durarara!! 3way standoff	Tom Tanaka		
2010	Dragon Ball Raging Blast 2	Ginyu		
2010	Starry Sky: After Spring	Haru Oshinari		
2010	Samurai Warriors 3: Xtreme Legends	Toshiie Maeda		
2010	The Legend of Heroes: Trails from Zero	Guy Bannings		
2011	Another Century's Episode Portable	Ozma Lee		
2011	Macross Triangle Frontier	Ozma Lee		
2011	Tales of the World: Radiant Mythology 3	Lloyd Irving		
2011	Rune Factory Oceans	Joe		
2011	Killzone 3	Thomas Cebu Sebuchenko		
2011	Gakuen Hetalia Portable	America		
2011	Rewrite	Sakuya Otori		
2011	Saint Seiya: Sanctuary Battle	Phoenix Ikki		
2011	Assassin's Creed Revelations	Altair Ibn La Ahad		
2011	Initial D Arcade Stage 6 AA	Hideo Minagawa		
2011	Samurai Warriors: Chronicles	Toshiie Maeda		
2011	Samurai Warriors 3: Empires	Toshiie Maeda		
2011	Suto*Mani: Strobe*Mania	Hayato Natsume		
2011	The Legend of Heroes: Trails to Azure	Guy Bannings		
2011	Warriors Orochi 3	Toshiie Maeda, Shuten Douji		
2012	Genso Suikoden: Tsumugareshi Hyakunen no Toki	Ducasse		
2012	Fist of the North Star: Ken's Rage 2	Kenshiro		
2012	Solomon's Ring	Asmodeus		
2012	Initial D Arcade Stage 7 AAX	Hideo Minagawa		
2012	Samurai Warriors: Chronicles 2nd	Toshiie Maeda		
2013	Valhalla Knights 3	Carlos		
2013	Shin Megami Tensei IV	Walter		
2013	Super Robot Wars Operation Extend	Kamina, Ozma Lee		
2013	Metal Max 4: Gekkō no Diva	Lalo		
2013	Gaist Crusher	Borukan		
2013	Warriors Orochi 3 Ultimate	Toshiie Maeda		
2014	J-Stars Victory VS	Kenshiro		
2014	Call of Duty: Advanced Warfare	Gideon	Japanese dub	
2014	Samurai Warriors 4	Toshiie Maeda		
2014	Samurai Warriors: Chronicle 3	Toshiie Maeda		
2015	Yakuza 0	Jun Oda		
2015	Samurai Warriors 4-II	Naomasa Ii, Toshiie Maeda		
2015	Fire Emblem Fates	Xander		
2015	Initial D Arcade Stage 8 Infinity	Hideo Minagawa		
2015	Idolish7	Sousuke Yaotome		
2015	Bloodborne	Alfred		
2016	The King of Fighters XIV	Maxima		
2016	Gundam Breaker 3	Mr. Gunpla		
2017	Final Fantasy XIV: Stormblood	Hien		
2017	Fire Emblem Heroes	Xander/Marx, Hubert		
2017	Fire Emblem Warriors	Xander/Marx		
2018	Octopath Traveler	Olberic Eisenberg		
2018	Identity V	Thief/Kreacher Pierson		
2018	Dragalia Lost	Ranzal		
2018	Mega Man 11	Torch Man, Rush		
2018	Granblue Fantasy	Hooded Figure/Beelzebub		
2018	Warriors Orochi 4	Naomasa Ii, Toshiie Maeda, Shuten Douji		
2019	Jump Force	Kenshiro		
2019	The King of Fighters All Star	Maxima		
2019	The King of Fighters for Girls	Maxima		
2019	Arknights	SilverAsh		
2019	Fire Emblem: Three Houses	Hubert von Vestra		
2019	Ikemen Sengoku: Toki o Kakeru Koi	Motonari Mouri		
2021	Samurai Warriors 5	Toshiie Maeda		
2021	JoJo's Bizarre Adventure: Last Survivor	Diavolo		
2022	The King of Fighters XV	Maxima		
2022	Lost Judgment	Kyoya Sadamoto		
2022	JoJo's Bizarre Adventure: All Star Battle R	Diavolo		
2022	Fitness Boxing: Fist of the North Star	Kenshiro		
2024	Honkai: Star Rail	Boothill		
2025	Fate/Grand Order	King Ashoka		
2026	Marvel Tokon: Fighting Souls	Ghost Rider		
2026	Neverness to Everness	Chaos		
2027	Romancing SaGa 3: Destinies United	Khalid		
2027	The Apothecary Diaries: The False Imperial Brother	Gaoshun		

=== Dubbing ===
Original year	Title	Role	Original actor	Notes	Reference
1968	Night of the Living Dead	Bill Cardille			
2000	Coyote Ugly	Kevin O'Donnell	Adam Garcia		
2000	Final Destination	Billy Hitchcock	Seann William Scott		
2002	Showtime	Lazy Boy	Mos Def		
2006	The Fast and the Furious: Tokyo Drift	Sean Boswell	Lucas Black		
2007	Illegal Tender	Wilson DeLeon Jr.	Rick Gonzalez		
2016	Jason Bourne	Craig Jeffers	Ato Essandoh	2022 BS Tokyo edition	
2016	Misconduct	The Accountant	Lee Byung-hun		
2019–2022	Euphoria	Fezco	Angus Cloud		
2020	Vanguard	Zhang Kaixuan	Ai Lun		
2021	Leonardo	Bernardo Bembo	Flavio Parenti		
2021–2023	The Nevers	Augustus Bidlow	Tom Riley		
2022	Black Adam	Samir	James Cusati-Moyer		
2022	The Calling	Avraham Avraham	Jeff Wilbusch		

=== Live-Action Dramas/Movies ===
Year	Title	Role	Notes	Reference
2004	Ultraman	Beast the One (Voiced by Ken'ya Ōsumi)	Movie	
2009	Kamen Rider Decade: All Riders vs. Dai-Shocker	Othet Kamen Rider und Kaijin (Voiced by Tooru Ohmura, Yuuki Anai, Tetsu Sakakura, Satoshi)	Movie	
2010	Tensou Sentai Goseiger	Gosei Knight	Episodes 17-50	
2010	Tensou Sentai Goseiger: Epic on the Movie	Gosei Knight	Movie	
2011	Tensou Sentai Goseiger vs. Shinkenger: Epic on Ginmaku	Gosei Knight	Movie	
2011	Gokaiger Goseiger Super Sentai 199 Hero Great Battle	Gosei Knight	Movie	
2011	Tensou Sentai Goseiger Returns	Gosei Knight	OV	
2013	Unofficial Sentai Akibaranger Season Tsu	Smapho Monger (Ep. 4), Kunimasmaphogany (Ep. 5)	Episodes 4 & 5	

=== Vomics ===
Year	Title	Role	Notes	Reference
2009–2010	Beelzebub	Tatsumi Oga		
2011	Kuroko's Basketball	Taiga Kagami		
2012	Medaka Box	Mahibi Moji		
