= Kōji Ishii =

Japanese voice actor (born 1960)

- 石井 康嗣
- Born: Kōji Ishii (石井 浩司); July 1, 1960 (age 66); Wakayama, Wakayama Prefecture, Japan
- Occupation: Voice actor
- Years active: 1988–present
- Agent: Freelance (Business tie-up with AMBERnote)

Kōji Ishii (石井 康嗣, Ishii Kōji; real name Kōji Ishii (石井 浩司, Ishii Kōji) born July 1, 1960) is a Japanese voice actor. His major roles include: Koutaro Taiga in The King of Braves GaoGaiGar, Giovanni Bertuccio in Gankutsuou: The Count of Monte Cristo, Shigematsu in Toriko, and Prime Minister Honest in Akame ga Kill!. In video games, he is the voice of Ryuji Yamazaki and Sokaku Mochizuki in the Fatal Fury series. He also voices Kaji Hyogo in Lime-iro Senkitan, Barlowe in Castlevania: Order of Ecclesia, Ikutidaal in Harukanaru Toki no Naka de, and Matsunaga Hisahide in Samurai Warriors Chronicles 3 and Samurai Warriors 4.

== Filmography ==
=== Anime ===
List of voice performances in anime
Year	Title	Role	Notes	Source
1993	Nintama Rantaro	Kinoshita Tetsumaru, Yagyu Retsu-go		
1994–1995	Gatchaman 94	Joe Asakura	OAV series	
1995–2002	Fushigi Yūgi series	Mitsukake, Tokaki	TV and OVA	
1995–1998	El-Hazard	Masamichi Fujisawa	TV and OVA	
1997	The King of Braves GaoGaiGar	Koutaro Taiga		
1999	Black Heaven	Tanaka Oji		
1999	Now and Then, Here and There	King Hamdo		
2000	The King of Braves GaoGaiGar Final	Koutaro Taiga	OVA	
2000	Hunter × Hunter	Silva Zoldyck	1999 TV series	
2001	Beyblade	Soichirou Hiwatari		
2002	Haruka: Beyond the Stream of Time ~Ajisai Yumegatari~	Ikutidaal	OVA	
2002	Azumanga Daioh	Kimura		
2002	Bomberman Jetters	Mujoe		
2003–2004	Lime-iro Senkitan series	Kaji Hyogo	TV and OVA	
2003	Astro Boy	Lamp		
2003	Papuwa	Harada Umako		
2003	Fullmetal Alchemist	Balt		
2004	Gankutsuou: The Count of Monte Cristo	Giovanni Bertuccio		
2004	Harukanaru Toki no Naka de Hachiyō Shō	Ikutidaal		
2005–2006	Ginga Legend Weed	Hougen		
2006	Super Robot Wars Original Generation: Divine Wars	Nibhal Mubhal		
2006	Reborn!	Dendrobii Kimura		
2007	Bleach	Dordonii Alessandro Del Socacchio		
2007	Romeo × Juliet	Lord Montague		
2007	Darker than Black	Kenneth		
2008, 2010	Major	Saunders	TV season 4, 6	
2008	Yu-Gi-Oh! 5D's	Takasu		
2008	Vampire Knight series	Asato Ichijo	Also Guilty	
2008	Skip Beat!	Lory Takarada		
2009	Mainichi Kaasan	Pinyari-kun		
2010	Bakugan: New Vestoria	King Zenoheld		
2010	Rainbow: Nisha Rokubō no Shichinin	Ishihara		
2010	Super Robot Wars Original Generation: The Inspector	Nibhal Mubhal		
2011	Toriko	Shigematsu		
2012	Inazuma Eleven GO: Chrono Stone	Sakamaki-Togurou		
2013	Samurai Flamenco	Prime Minister Okuzaki		
2014	Akame ga Kill	Prime Minister Honest		
2014	Terra Formars	Narrator		
2016	Tonkatsu DJ Agetarō	Agesaku Katsumata		
	Kimezo キメゾー	Kimezo		
	One Piece	Fisher Tiger		
2016	91 Days	Scusa		
2017	Nobunaga no Shinobi	Kitabatake Tomonori		
2017	Tomica Hyper Rescue Drive Head Kidō Kyūkyū Keisatsu	Dr. Karigari		
2018	Xuan Yuan Sword Luminary	Emperor Long Xiao		
2020	Gibiate	Renjiro Hatonami		
2021	Hortensia Saga	Gaston		
2022	Shine On! Bakumatsu Bad Boys!	Teijirō Akizuki		
2023	Ultraman	Mephisto	ONA; season 3	
2024	The Fable	Hiroshi Hamada (Oyaji)		
2025	New Panty & Stocking with Garterbelt	Garterbelt		

=== Tokusatsu ===
List of voice performances in feature films
Year	Title	Role	Notes	Source
2011	Kaizoku Sentai Gokaiger	Chief of Staff Damaras	Eps. 1 - 14, 17 - 19, 22, 24 - 30, 31 - 34, 35 - 38, 41 - 43	
2011	Kaizoku Sentai Gokaiger The Movie: The Flying Ghost Ship	Chief of Staff Damaras	Movie	
2016	Kamen Rider 1	Dark Mind	Movie	
2019	Kamen Rider Reiwa The First Generation	Another 1/Another New 1	Movie	

=== Film ===
List of voice performances in feature films
Year	Title	Role	Notes	Source
1993	Rail of the Star ja:お星さまのレール	Interpretation		
1997	The day the earth has moved ja:地球が動いた日	Sakai-sensei		
2000	Sin: The Movie	John Blade		
2004	Yu-Gi-Oh! The Movie: Pyramid of Light	Anubis		
2005	Zeta Gundam A New Translation: Heirs to the Stars	Blex Forer		
2005	Zeta Gundam A New Translation II: Lovers	Blex Forer		
2005	Black Jack: Futari no Kuroi Isha	Gill		
2006	Zeta Gundam A New Translation III: Love is the Pulse of the Stars	Dogosse Gier Captain		
2008	Strait Jacket	Brian Meno Moderato	OVA series repackaged to feature film	
2008	Major: Yūjō no Winning Shot	Saunders		
2009	Redline	Machine head Tetsujin		
2010	Crayon Shin-chan: Super-Dimension! The Storm Called My Bride	KimuYu Electric CM narration		
2011	Gekijō-ban Anime Nintama Rantarō Ninjutsu Gakuen Zenin Shutsudō! no Dan ja:劇場版アニメ 忍たま乱太郎 忍術学園 全員出動!の段	Kinoshita Tetsumaru		
2011	Fullmetal Alchemist: The Sacred Star of Milos	Graz		
2012	Fairy Tail the Movie: Phoenix Priestess	Cannon		
2013	Doraemon: Nobita's Secret Gadget Museum	Dr. Hartmann		
2014	Space Battleship Yamato 2199: Odyssey of the Celestial Ark	Bodom Mace		
2019	Detective Conan: The Fist of Blue Sapphire	Ginzo Nakamori		
2019	Kamen Rider Reiwa The First Generation	Another 1		
2025	Doraemon: Nobita's Art World Tales	Isere		

=== Video games ===
List of voice performances in video games
Year	Title	Role	Notes	Source
1993	Samurai Shodown	Neinhalt Sieger		
1995	Fatal Fury 3: Road to the Final Victory	Sokaku Mochizuki, Ryuji Yamazaki		
1995	Real Bout Fatal Fury	Sokaku Mochizuki, Ryuji Yamazaki		
1997	Real Bout Fatal Fury Special	Sokaku Mochizuki, Ryuji Yamazaki		
1997	The King of Fighters '97	Ryuji Yamazaki		
1998	Tenchu	Akira		
1998	Real Bout Fatal Fury 2: The Newcomers	Sokaku Mochizuki, Ryuji Yamazaki		
1998	Daraku Tenshi: The Fallen Angels	Trigger		
1998	The King of Fighters '98	Ryuji Yamazaki		
1998	The King of Fighters: Kyo	Ryuji Yamazaki, Yagami's ancestor		
1998	Mikagura Shōjo Tanteidan	Moroboshi Daijiro	PS1/PS2	
1999	Fatal Fury: Wild Ambition	Ryuji Yamazaki		
1999	Garou: Mark of the Wolves	Gato		
2000	Harukanaru Toki no Naka de	Ikutidaal	PS1/PS2	
2002	Groove Adventure Rave: Mikan no Hiseki	Pumpkin Drew	PS1/PS2	
2002	The King of Fighters 2002	Ryuji Yamazaki	Also Unlimited Match	
2002–04	Lime-iro Senkitan series	Kaji Hyogo		
2003	Summon Night: Swordcraft Story	Rundle, Rob		
2003	The King of Fighters 2003	Ryuji Yamazaki, Gato		
2003	DreamMix TV World Fighters	Mujoe	GameCube, PlayStation 2	
2003	Fullmetal Alchemist and the Broken Angel	Wilhelm Eiselstein	PS1/PS2	
2004	Fullmetal Alchemist 2: Curse of the Crimson Elixir	Baldo	PS1/PS2	
2004	Tales of Rebirth	Dobaru		
2005	Harukanaru Toki no Naka de Hachiyō Shō	Ikutidaal	PS1/PS2	
2005	Shadow Hearts: From the New World	Killer	PS1/PS2	
2005	The King of Fighters XI	Gato		
2006	Final Fantasy XII	Ba'gamnan		
2006	Harukanaru Toki no Naka de Overnight	Ikutidaal	PS1/PS2	
2007	Lost Odyssey	Kakanasu	Xbox 360	
2008	Castlevania: Order of Ecclesia	Barlow	DS	
2008	Blazer Drive	Beast	DS	
2008	Tales of Hearts	Geo Sutorigau	DS	
2009–15	Atelier Rorona: The Alchemist of Arland	Meriodasu-Orukokku	Also Plus versions	
2011	The Last Story	Count Arganan	Wii	
2011	Growlanser Wayfarer of Time	Bauer	PSP	
2011	Dead Island	Rider		
2012	Under Night In-Birth	Waldstein	Reprised role in EXE:Late in 2014 and EXE:Latest in 2015	
2012	Soulcalibur V	Edge Master	PS3/Xbox 360	
2014	Samurai Warriors 4	Matsunaga Hisahide		
2014	Samurai Warriors Chronicles 3	Matsunaga Hisahide		
2015	Dissidia Final Fantasy NT	Garland	Arcade, PlayStation 4, Microsoft Windows	
2018	BlazBlue: Cross Tag Battle	Waldstein	PC/PS4/Switch	
2018	Soulcalibur VI		PC/PS4/Xbox One	
	Tomb Raider	Pierre		
2020	Granblue Fantasy	Agielba	Android, iOS, PC	

=== Drama CDs ===
List of voice performances in drama recordings
Title	Role	Notes	Source
Barbarian Quartetto		Drama and Talk CDs	
Dragon Quest	Carmen	Drama CD	
El-Hazard	Fujisawa-sensei	Drama, Talk CDs, radio	
Garou: Mark of the Wolves	Gato	Drama, Talk, Song CDs and Radio	
Maromaryu	Master carpenter	Drama CD	
Neo Geo DJ Station		Talk CD	
Rurouni Kenshin		Talk CD	
Sword World Heppoko Boukentai	Galgado	Drama CD	
The King of Fighters	Ryuji Yamazaki	Drama, Talk, Song CDs and Radio	

=== Overseas dubbing ===
List of dub performances in overseas productions
Title	Role	Voice dub for, Notes	Source
A Time to Kill	James Lewis Willard		
Chuck	Mr. Colt, Clyde Decker	Michael Clarke Duncan, season 2 and 4	
Cold Case	Thai Sugar	season 4	
Criminal Minds	Blake Wells	season 6	
Grimm	Baron	Reg E. Cathey, season 2	
John Carter	Tarusu Tarukasu	Willem Dafoe	
Léon: The Professional	Malky	Peter Appel	
The Looney Tunes Show	Yosemite Sam	Maurice LaMarche	
The Matrix	Ejonto Jones		
Nurse Jackie	Anthony	season 3	
The Pink Panther	Pink Panther		
The Powerpuff Girls	Mojo Jojo	Roger L. Jackson	
The Little Mermaid	Viking		
The Penguins of Madagascar	Kowalski	Jeff Bennett	
Shane	Rufus Ryker	Emile Meyer, New Era Movies edition	
Space Jam: A New Legacy	Yosemite Sam		
Storks	Alpha		
Tugs	Zebedee, Fire Tug, Mighty Mo, Old Rusty, Nantucket		
Wayward Pines	Christopher James Mitchum	Djimon Hounsou	
Wonka	Bleacher	Tom Davis	
