= List of Skip Beat! characters =

The Skip Beat! universe consists of a large array of characters. Yoshiki Nakamura has created a fictional world giving the country of Japan an alternate reality featuring imaginary actors, singers and other entertainers. The heroine, Kyoko Mogami, attempts to become a star in show business to get revenge on Shō Fuwa. As the protagonist surmounts obstacles on her journey to stardom, new situations and characters are introduced.

== Main characters ==
=== Kyoko Mogami ===
Voiced by: Miki Nagasawa (drama CD), Marina Inoue (Japanese); Caitlin Glass (English) (anime), Ivy Chen (live-action)
Instead of staying home and attending high school in Kyoto, Kyoko Mogami (最上 キョーコ, Mogami Kyōko) travels with her childhood friend Shō Fuwa to Tokyo to help him while he makes it big as an idol. When she finds out that he only invited her so she could be his maid, her heart and innocence are shattered. This results in her Pandora's Box opening and releasing a manifestation of hatred, as little demons. More vengeful than depressed, she swears to avenge herself. Shō comments the only way to do this would be to beat him in show business, so that's what she decides to do. She changes her hair style and begins the task of applying to Shō's rival company (Akatoki Agency), L.M.E. While her audition stood out (she performed katsura), the president of the company realized that she lacked the key point needed to become an idol: love, as without genuine love for this profession and for the audience, she cannot make it far in this world. However, despite her failure, she had such an impressionable audition that Kyoko is given a second chance. The L.M.E. "Love Me" section is thus founded. Lory makes a deal with Kyoko that if she wholeheartedly completes all the jobs given to her as a Love-Me employee to the client's satisfaction (which is determined by how many points they stamp onto her record book), by the end of a certain period of time, when she has accumulated enough points, she will be given a grand debut. Thus begins her journey into the show business world.
As an actress, Kyoko is unrefined but creative and spontaneous, able to impress talent scouts with her unique talents and improvisations. In her earlier jobs, she utilizes the skills she learned from working in an inn in Kyoto Prefecture (like cooking, walking "properly", and performing a traditional tea ceremony) to act the part of a wealthy, cultured lady. Though passionate and hot-tempered, Kyoko is able to show impressive professionalism and discipline when it comes to acting, even to the point of putting the job before her health. When forced to perform a tea ceremony in a movie scene with Ren, she is able to keep a serene face and act her part while kneeling on a badly fractured ankle. Yet despite the pain, she refuses to get up or stop until the scene is completed. Because of this, the director and everyone else was incredibly awed by her determination and strength. Later on, Shuhei (Kuu), Ren's father, says she was a "scary kind of actress", much like Ren. Her debut was for a soft drink commercial. Kyoko never liked to drink soda (even as a child) but she made herself drink it for the important commercial audition. Her first major role was Mio, the antagonist in the television drama Dark Moon.
Her character, disregarding her acting capabilities is shown to be very pure regardless of whether she's in a good or a bad mood, as seen when she was fuming after Shō stole her first kiss when she was hoping for her first kiss to be like what it was in fairy tales. Not long after that, she's thrown into a huge dilemma over Ren's attempted kiss on her cheek to get Shō out of her mind (which is now replaced with Ren and couldn't concentrate on the Dark Moon set later on). Before Ren tries to prove that the kiss doesn't have any hidden intentions behind it by stating that "Foreigners express their affection often using actions", Kyoko thought that Ren was a playboy, but has since retracted her statement because she believed his reasoning.
Kyoko has a fondness for cosmetics, fairy tales (aforementioned are linked to princesses) and anything magical (she was raised in a very strict manner due to being part of an inn, and thus such tales are one of the ways where she would get away from it), as seen when Kanae gave her a rare cosmetics set as a present on her birthday, which is December 25.
She becomes a regular in a show wearing a chicken suit for the character "Bo". She assumes this character on several occasions to talk to Ren, because he won't open up about his problems to anyone he knows. As Kanae is her first true friend, she likes to cling on to her and calls her "Moko"(because Kanae uses 'Mo' often as an interjection) (she doesn't have any friends before then because every girl hated Kyoko for her familiarity with Shō).
When she is in her room in "Darumaya" she is often seen explaining how she would exact revenge on the two men that make her life miserable to a large poster of Shōtaro and a small photo of Ren, the picture becomes much larger as the story progresses (the size of the picture reflects her level of hatred towards the person on it). She also carries with her many curse dolls of Ren and Shō, which she uses to vent her anger and perform curses. The dolls, incredible in the attention to detail, are handmade by Kyoko. They feature Shō and Ren in various state of fear, distress and submission. After her relationship with Ren improves, she often 'consults' her Ren doll during times of stress.
Kyoko seems to have a bad relationship with her parents. Her mother, Saena, was a strict and emotionally distant parent who eventually left her with the Fuwa family when Kyoko was still six. The effects of Kyoko's difficult childhood can be seen throughout the series, particularly in her acting. For example, when she was acting with Maria, she stated that parents that despise their children really exist. Kyoko's father has been absent throughout the series. As her parents were not able to give her love, she followed Shō with all her heart (before the start of the series), but after his betrayal, she has lost all hope and became very cynical when it comes to love and thus it is a taboo subject for her, with the slightest mention of it getting her all angry and depressed. Valentine's Day is also the most hated occasion for her, and she believes that all girls who give chocolate to men out of love will end up like her.
Kyoko has a noticeable crush on Ren later in the series but she mistakes it for respect sometimes and even denies it since she "couldn't possibly let herself fall in love again". After seeing the certain scene where "Katsuki" (played by Ren) is looking at the girl he loves in the play, Kyoko remembers the smile (he has shown it for her a couple of times before) and comes to the conclusion that Ren might not hate her or dislike her, as she thought before. It is shown that Kyoko does not know that Ren is "Corn" her "fairy-prince". Recently, she was the caretaker for Kuu (aka Shuhei), an actor who played in the previous version of the drama "Dark Moon". He is also Ren's father, although Kyoko does not know this.
After Dark Moon started airing, Kyoko was cast in a high school drama as Natsu, which is a "Bully Role"; however Kyoko runs into the problem of being type-cast, as the director asks her to do her "Natsu" role based on "Mio". This is in spite of the fact that two roles should be different, as Mio is an extremely embittered rich young heiress, while Natsu is a relatively normal girl from a normal family who merely likes to pick on her classmates. But after some training from Ren on "how to act like a model" she stuns the cast with her new appearance and attitude for the role of Natsu, easily impressing the director with this new representation of Natsu.
Later on, Kyoko was given a job by the president that she was to meet a scary person by the name of Cain Heel, who turns out to be Ren, who is into his character so much to the extent that Kyoko fell due to fear. After the incident, Ren confronted her and revealed who he was. He brought her back to the president and the president bestowed a job to Kyoko; she was to act as Cain Heel's younger sister, Setsuka, or better known as Setsu. She was given a complete makeover to complete the role of Cain's sister.
Kyoko was trying to find the correct method to portray Setsu, and was unable to get fully into character, as seen when she was tremendously worried about Ren (as Cain Heel)'s safety while he's fighting off 4 guys who attacked him after his refusal to allow them to hit on Kyoko (as Setsuka Heel) and when she was yelling at Ren to stop when he was about to lose it and injure one badly, which is different from her previous characters, when she's fully in character as Mio and Natsu even while off-set, and continued to act as Kuon even while meeting Ren and Yashiro at Sunrise TV. More recently, Kyoko has started to realize her "new feelings" for Ren. In one monologue, she talks about how all the locks on her "box", except onem fell off when Ren kissed her on the cheek. However, she was able to put them back on and seal back up her "box." She goes on to say that at the moment Ren took her hands and said "let's do this together", most of the locks came off easily. Kyoko constantly denies these feelings to herself, trying to convince herself (somewhat unsuccessfully) that Ren sees her as a child and not as a love interest.
Now, she seems to have 'found Setsu', as she is completely in character, even going so far as to walk into the bathroom when Ren (acting as Cain) is taking a bath, shocking the director who was the one who 'created' the character 'Cain Heel'. Previously, when she accidentally walked in on Ren while he was showering (she was worried about him since he wouldn't answer her) she panicked for a long time, though she covered it in front of Ren, causing him to wonder if she saw him as a man.
Currently, she's trying to find a way to help Ren come out of the darkness that's haunting him (his past). While on a break from acting as Setsuka, she is pondering over the situation and wonders if someone has lost their life because of Ren, though she never finishes the thought since Kijima (a well known actor whose interest in Kyoko is obvious to everyone but her) texts her.
After begin captured by Shō with the help of Mimori, Kyoko is forced to go to lunch with him, where after concerned with her punctuality makes him give her a lift to her next job (TMB). But when she meets eyes with an unexpected Ren Tsuruga who also has work there, Shō makes Kyoko tell him her real feelings for Ren Tsuruga. She tells Shō that she feels nothing for him and states "I don't want to turn into an idiot [(fall in love)] again. [...] and even if I were to become an idiot again for some reason... it still... wouldn't be because of Tsuruga-san" in chapter 191. Kyoko arrives at her job to play Bo still late even after the whole ordeal, Kyoko admits to herself that if she were to allow herself to become an "idiot" again she would be worse of an idiot with Tsuruga than she ever was with Shō.
The next day Kyoko is nervous because she knows that Tsuruga is bound to be angry at her but when she doesn't receive even a phone call, she can't help but worry. But now she must suppress the unwanted feelings and return to being Setsuka Heel and live with her awaiting dotting older brother and beloved senpai who is still dealing with his suppressed unresolved feeling of dismay (he's really mad at this point because of Kyoko's text message to Kijima, and seeing her with Shō) and the shadows which lurk from his past.
At first things appear normal between the Heel siblings in the hotel room. Setsu finds Cain lolling on an armchair and comments that Cain need not have waited for her in such an uncomfortable position. Cain replies that he gets restless when she's not with him and adds that he should "tie her up in chains so that she would think of nothing but him." Setsu remarks that it was a good idea but was interrupted by her cell phone ringing. She apprehensively picks it up, guessing it is Shō.
Cain notices her flustered expression and takes the phone. He realizes as well that the call is from Fuwa and flings it away in a fit of anger. The phone breaks and Shō is no longer able to make the call.
Shō spends some time ruminating over what could have possibly happened. By this time he has got cold feet over his actions as they might drive Kyoko closer to his rival.
Meanwhile, Ren angrily confronts Kyoko about the phone call and her meeting earlier with Shō. Kyoko freezes as she realizes that the person before her is not the Ren Tsuruga she knows. She starts to back away and falls on the bed. Ren pins her down and continues to question her. He gets depressed as he feels that Kyoko's lack of response is a confirmation of a rekindled relationship with Fuwa.
Kyoko then surprises him by flipping him over and straddling him. She didn't want Ren to fall into the darkness that she believes herself to be in. She wants him to possibly, remain on a pedestal, where she would never be able to reach him. She decides to tackle the situation at hand by continuing to act as Setsu, and teases Cain about his unreasonable jealousy. She assures him that it was nothing important. Cain was her most important person and for the first time in the manga Kyoko takes the initiative to kiss Ren on the forehead.
At this point, a stunned Kuon is brought to his senses. He realizes he broke character and immediately switches over to Cain, to Kyoko's relief.
Setsu comments that her lipstick mark was stuck on his head. Cain replied it wasn't permanent and so Setsu unzips his jacket, offering to make a permanent one on his chest. Kyoko used this scene from an old adult movie she had seen with Shōtaro where the girl sensually took off the man's shirt.
However, Kyoko starts to freak out now as she has no idea how to make a kiss mark and bites Ren's neck hard instead. Cain advises her on how to do it properly, and this angers Kyoko as she realizes that Ren must have had a lot of experience with other women. She hides her jealousy and continues as Setsu, saying that Cain will always be in her heart. She proceeds to kiss his neck at the same spot and lightly sucks it. Cain then assures her that he will never break out of character again or disappoint her. For him, too, she is his most important person in his heart.
At this point Kyoko looks up blushing. She realizes she has the wrong expression on her face but is immediately flipped over by Cain who offers to make a kiss mark on her shoulder as proof of his promise and also as a lesson on the proper technique.
Setsu stops him saying coldly that she does not want to experience the techniques that he has learnt from another woman. She pushes him away and gets off the bed saying she will find other men to practice on. Cain stops her and she replies she was only joking and wanted to go shopping for breakfast. Cain makes her stay in the room and goes out alone. In the elevator he finally accepts his true self. Ren and Kuon merge and a new Ren Tsuruga is born.
In recent chapters, Kyoko has subconsciously broken character while playing Setsu. In chapter 199, she has gotten mad at Ren (while playing Cain) because he touched/pat another girl's head/hair causing the girl to fall head over heels in love with Cain. She breaks character when she hides the fact that she is mad, something she did all the time in the past with Shō. Her character, Setsu would have been openly mad and Kyoko realizes this. She realizes also that her feelings for Ren which she had been denying for so long were starting to show through and it scares her. She thinks that he won't return her feeling and will be disappointed in her. She sees these feelings as poisonous and tries to bottle them up again. In chapter 200 however, her feelings accidentally show through while Ren acting as Cain is trying to comfort her and the L.M.E. president disguised as a construction worker sees. Kyoko is worried that he will tell Ren now. However, after a private chat with the president, Kyoko comes to terms with her feelings with Ren and accepts them, seeming more at peace now that she had done so. The locks on her box have been shown to all be off.
After finally confronting the enigmatic figure of her mother, named Saena, in-person for the first time, Kyoko questions her for some explanation behind her life-long hatred. Her mother agrees, and says she'll spare nothing. Kyoko acknowledges her feelings might be hurt, and learns the sad story of her conception. Saena is weak from depression for months before discovering her pregnancy; after going to clinics & hospitals for one willing to perform an abortion, none will perform the procedure due to her frail state. Saena passed the legal 6month limit & tried to commit suicide instead, and she & Kyoko were saved by concerned coworkers. Kyoko learns from her mother all about the dastardly man that betrayed her & work circumstances that drove her to unimaginable depths of despair and hatred. Kyoko tells her mother "I like this life of mine." and says she wishes she could stop hoping for Saena's love, but she can't, and she won't stop trying. She says "One day, you'll be proud to say I'm your daughter!" and asks Saena to pat her on the head and tell her Good Job on that day.
Saena responds, eyes watering slightly, "If that's what you want..."

==== Pandora's box ====
The Pandora's box is used metaphorically as the loss of innocence. Resulting in the box being opened after Shou's betrayal. It sets free a lot of little demons aka mini-mes. They have metaphysical properties in the context of the story, such as make people unable to move, choking them or scaring them to death. It is recognized as a spiritual ability in the context of the story, but that it is not really visible to people, except the ones with psychic powers such as Reino. It's a tool to insert humor in the story, more than physically playing a role in the metaphysical world. Though, it is the 'quirk' or 'superability' of the character.

=== Ren Tsuruga ===
Voiced by: Ken Narita (drama CD), Katsuyuki Konishi (anime) (Japanese); Robbie Daymond (English), Siwon (live-action)
Ren Tsuruga (敦賀 蓮, Tsuruga Ren) is, in outward appearances, an extremely nice and polite star. However, he shows his true self whenever he deals with Kyoko. He was originally unhappy with Kyoko, because she joined show business for revenge. However, he gradually warms up towards her. Realizing that she isn't just trying to become an actress for revenge and supports her growth as a budding idol. Although at times teasing, he is in love with Kyoko. For example, he does not allow himself to be near her alone sometimes, because the urge to hold her is increasing. (In volume twelve, when Kyoko falls, after trying to get a pot from the cabinet and, instead of crashing into the chair she was standing on, Ren catches her and hugs her despite himself). He quickly recovered so that Kyoko would not discover his mistake. He has also hugged her in Act 98–99 after Reino, Kyoko's stalker, tells her that "Corn" might be dead; not wanting to see Kyoko cry and, as a result of another one of his urges, he holds her tight and tells her that Corn, her childhood friend, is fine. He also hates Shō Fuwa, because of his ties to Kyoko. Some of the people closest to him have begun to notice his feelings for Kyoko, namely, Ren's manager, Yashiro, and the agency's president, Takarada.
Although he frequently dated in the past and has had a lot of girlfriends, he actually had zero experience with love. This fact caused him to struggle a great deal while defining his character's role in Dark Moon.
At the age of twenty, Ren has lived a large portion of his life in America. In fact, he began his acting career in the United States, albeit disastrously. Although he gained experience, he was fired so often that he has lost count, an experience which is in sharp contrast to the staunch and disciplined actor he is today. Fortunately, his past in America is unknown to the public as Ren Tsuruga is only a stage name. He is the son of a famous actor named Kuu Hizuri and his mother's name is Julie. Although there are hints of a dark past, his earlier years are shrouded in mystery (though it is noted that when he was in his teens, he felt a lot of pressure from his parents and therefore escaped from America to Japan). It has recently been revealed that he is constantly tormented by the death of his best friend, which he believes is his fault (though from the flashbacks it looks as though it was an unfortunate accident). Recent chapters show that his real name is Kuon Hizuri (久遠・ヒズリ, Kuon Hizuri). Back when he was a kid, he became friends with Kyoko. But to this day, Kyoko still pronounces his name wrong, calling him "Corn," though that is actually due to her memory of his name being "Corn" since their time as children. It is shown that at her current age, Kyoko pronounces his name as "Kuon" as what is seen at the end of Chapter 105 when Kuu Hizuri asked Kyoko to act as his son.
It has been shown repeatedly that Ren detests Shō more than anyone else, as seen when he became very angry after seeing "Hatred" written on one of Kyoko's chocolates because he assumed that those are for Shō.
Ren's birthday is February 10th, but Kyoko thought it was the 19th, because of a typo. She had ordered a present for him and asked if he would still accept it on the fourteenth. Ren said, "Of course, but I would be very happy Mogami-san smile for me as a present." Around this time, Ren received a lot of Valentine's Day chocolates that he decided not to eat because he'll feel like he'll have to eat all of them. Yashiro-san said he liked his fair attitude, but what if Kyoko made him chocolates, what would he do then? He doesn't get chocolates from her which makes him mad at first but later receives wine jelly from her which makes him happy that he reassures he won't be swayed by her actions. After Shō kissed Kyoko, he at first seems mean to her by snorting and saying she was acting stupid, but later tries to convince Kyoko what had happened was not a kiss. He later reveals his real intentions by warning to never let it happen again with a scary face. At the end of chapter 148, it appears as though he may kiss her. He does, but on the cheek, spiraling Kyoko into more worries. Ren seems to enjoy this a bit too much, knowing all too well that Kyoko can't put his kiss on the cheek out of her mind, which is true. He may be closest male that Kyoko allow her heart to open up to without knowing themselves.
He has been described and shown to be experienced in martial arts to a certain degree, described when his father Kuu Hizuri went with a shower of praises when asked by Kyoko to name him one of his characteristics while trying to act as Kuon, and shown in flashbacks when Kuon single-handedly beat up several guys who had been bullying him, and when he (as Cain Heel) handled four guys who attacked him after he stopped them from hitting on Kyoko (as Setsuka Heel).

=== Shō Fuwa ===
Voiced by: Nobutoshi Kanna (drama CD), Mamoru Miyano (Japanese); Grant George (English) (anime), Donghae (live-action)
With his real name being Shōtarō (松太郎), Shō Fuwa (不破 尚, Fuwa Shō) keeps it a secret because he finds it a very old-fashioned and traditional name. He is a typical stuck-up star and is also very ruthless. Shō had no qualms about tricking Kyoko into going with him to Tokyo so she could be a free servant for him. He also had even less qualms about being extremely cruel to her when she discovered this. Shō eventually figured out that Kyoko was in L.M.E. and was surprised to see her transformation. It is also revealed that he has more feelings for her than he originally thought, such as in Act. 82 when he personally brought some medical cream for the cut in Kyoko's face (caused by him), and apologized sincerely. Most notably during the Dark Moon shoot over a resort, Kyoko's stalker Reino announced in front of Shō, that he plans to steal her away from him. Reino from the band Vie Ghoul had stolen one of Shō's music sheets/songs previously planning to use it for their own success. When Reino chased Kyoko through the forest, Shō followed pursuit and was the one who protected Kyoko even calling Kyoko "his woman". Also, he tells Reino that he would not give up his position as the person Kyoko thinks about the most even if the emotion she feels for him is hatred. However this moment was not witnessed by Kyoko. Also, when confronted by Kyoko as to why he continues to help her, despite being enemies, he almost confesses that he loves her before being interrupted by Ren, who didn't want Shō to get close to Kyoko. Despite his ruthless and cold personality, Shō has a sense of humor that he keeps buried deep down, nearly busting a gut laughing in private to Kyoko's mispronouncing Vie Ghoul as Beagle. As Kyoko once commented, Shō has loved comedy Shōws on TV since they were both kids.
Initially, Shō acted with a general possessiveness for Kyoko, who had been his constant companion and servant since childhood. Further on in the series though, Shō begins to show a kinder side to her and hints that he has real feelings as opposed to just possessive feelings. Once he finds out that Ren Tsuruga is in love with Kyoko too, he gets extremely angry. Shō thinks of Ren as his rival and is extremely petty at times when they meet, even going as far as to pick a fight with him. Shō is also a big flirt and can be very shallow. He tends to like older women, but he is fine with women with big breasts and oozing pheromones. Shō has disliked Ren because he is the coolest guy in Show Biz. Shō says he's going to steal all of Ren's fans and the title of "The Coolest Male Celebrity" from him.
Despite his nature, Shō's talent as a singer is in fact, quite good. Shō's original songs attracted many fans as well as his looks, but that did not stop from these fans from quickly falling in love with the copy-cat band Vie-Ghoul. With the sudden revelation that his fans could easily leave him for another band if the sound was the same, Shō was deeply troubled that he could be surpassed so easily. With some unintended help/lecture from Kyoko, Shō realizes the deep feelings he has had for the situation and decides to put his heart into his singing. His consistent release of new hit songs signifies he is rising to the top of his singing career, devastating Kyoko. He has gone so far as being "untouchable" by the Vie-Ghoul, as their spy had stopped stealing Shō's lyrics due to new found respect and love for his job and Shō's determination to become a star.
Also, Shō has been extremely jealous (yet constantly denies this) after the order of Kyoko's chocolates got mixed up into saying that she loved the leader of Vie-Ghoul (where they actually stated she was annoyed at him). Because of this, he believes that Kyoko is in love with the Leader, someone he considers worse than Ren and is "unacceptable". Shō has gotten so angry that he takes on the appearance of Japanese demons. So in an effort to prove he is not jealous, he buys a very large bouquet of flowers as a "congrats" present to them. However, after discovering that Kyoko does not in fact love Reino, he forcefully kisses her, stunning the Dark Moon cast.
When Kyoko yells at him and pushes him away, Shō smirks at Ren. Ren is very angry, but manages to keep his emotions under control. According to Shō, he wanted a taste of the expensive chocolate he gave her and kissed her to get a piece of it from her mouth. Shō then walks away, confident that he has reassured his place as the one who has the biggest place in her heart even though she hates him. It is noted that Kyoko and Shō have an inescapable bond that can't be cut or replaced as they often meet under sudden circumstances. Most of the people who have developed feelings for Kyoko or Shō feel that they can't come between them.
Recently, in an attempt to keep Kyoko from falling in love with Ren, Shō has tricked Kyoko into making a bet that if she falls in love with Tsuruga Ren, she has to give up her dream of being an actress and return to their hometown and become a waitress in his parents' inn for life. He does this knowing fully well that, it would be the last thing that Kyoko would actually want and so she would resist falling in love with Ren.

== Supporting characters ==
Kanae Kotonami (琴南 奏江, Kotonami Kanae)
Voiced by: Yukiko Tagami (drama CD), Risa Hayamizu (Japanese); Erica Lindbeck (English), Bianca Bai (live-action)
Kotonami's character, at first glance, looks like she was being set up to be the villain to Kyoko's heroine, but as with all of the female characters in this series, Kanae is much more sympathetic than she appears. While there was fur flying about at the beginning, both girls have a need for a true friend, and ultimately find that in each other (albeit reluctantly on Kanae's part and too willingly on Kyoko's part). After their tag-team effort in winning an audition for a commercial, the two become best friends. Kyoko likes to call her "Moko". Despite some differences in their personality, both girls recognize that they are in fact very similar, most notably their desperate determination to reach the top of the show-biz pyramid. Both coming from a poor family, they strive endlessly to achieve their dreams. This, they recognize in each other, thus leading them to become friends. They are both incredible actresses with a great deal of respect for each other's talents. Kanae desperately wanted to be a star and was at the same audition as Kyoko, but although she did better than Kyoko, she also failed. She became the second member of Love Me, and has used that to her advantage. Kanae puts up a strong front, but is very self-conscious and is prone to self doubt. It is later revealed that Kotonami has problem dealing with kids, stemming from the fact that she comes from a large family with an obscenely large amount of younger nieces, nephews, and siblings. Although her attitude towards Kyoko may seem aloof at times, it is clear that she values their friendship, as she reluctantly shares her secret with Kyoko when she fears her unwillingness to share her troubles might drive Kyoko away. She figure outs that Ren is in love with Kyoko and tries to top things that will gain Kyoko's affection against Ren. Recently she has invited Kyoko over her house to make valentine's day chocolate for Hio. Hio helped her get away from a musician she detests, so she made chocolates for him. It seems that she has a soft spot for Hio as she has given him warm smiles from time to time. She and Chiori hit it off right away and also become really good friends.
Yukihito Yashiro (社 倖一, Yashiro Yukihito)
Voiced by: Masahito Kawanago (Japanese); Vic Mignogna (English) (anime), King Chin (live-action)
He is Ren's manager. When first seen he is a serious character, later on he is used largely for comic relief. We get a better understanding of Ren's subtle emotional shifts from Yashiro's not-so-subtle reactions to Ren's interactions with Kyoko. He fully supports a romantic relationship between the two and often needles Ren about his lack of progress in that area. To that goal, he sets up various situations where the two can be alone. (Act. 66 He tells Kyoko to go to Ren's place to make dinner for him.) And tells Kyoko of Ren's feelings for her (Act. 57, during the acting test when Kyoko got stuck. Kyoko was lost in thought and didn't hear him.) He must use latex gloves when handling any electronics because any electronic device that he touches directly will soon be rendered broken and useless. In particular, he has mentioned that a cell phone will die after about 10 seconds of direct exposure to his skin. (On at least one occasion, Yashiro attempted to coerce Ren into telling him Kyoko's secrets by holding Ren's own cell phone captive with his bare hand.) Kyoko has theorized that Yashiro naturally transmits strong electric waves. He seems to be an extremely dedicated manager, as he has much, if not all, of Ren's schedule planned out about one year in advance (Kyoko learns this when she briefly took over for him as Ren's manager when he was too ill to work). In an extra strip in volume 11, it is revealed that the main reason Ren has never been late to a job, despite the crowds of fans that appear nearly everywhere he goes and clearly wish to mob him, is that Yashiro can stop even the most fervid fans in their tracks with a mere cold glance. He doesn't know how to drive, which is why Ren is always seen doing the driving. The guilt of having Ren drive is the reason why he does not enforce a more balanced diet when the two are traveling between locations and allows Ren to choose what they eat.
Lory Takarada (ローリィ宝田, Rōri Takarada)
Voiced by: Banjo Ginga (drama CD), Kouji Ishii (Japanese); Richard Epcar (English) (anime), Allen Chao (live-action)
Lory is the extravagantly flamboyant president of L.M.E. He is one of the first people to recognize Kyoko's potential of being a great star, and created the "Love Me" section because of this. He seems genuinely concerned for Kyoko and wonders what could have happened in her past to cause her to lose the ability to love. He learns in Vol. 4 that Kyoko has never known her father and has a bad relationship with her mother, but does not know the details. Later, when he learned that she dropped out of school he arranges for her to attend a high school that specializes in accommodating students working in show business and their hectic schedules. Lory has a very deep voice, and often has a huge entourage with him to create the world's most striking and sometimes strangest entrances. He also has a granddaughter, Maria, who idolizes Kyoko. He also knows that Ren is really Kuon Hizuri, a secret everyone else doesn't know about except for himself, Ren, and Ren's family. In Act. 77 Access to the Blue, it is shown that President Takarada realizes that Ren is in love with Kyoko. He has a son, Maria's father, named Kouki, who is the polar opposite of him. They are similar in their work ethics, however. Lory loves Valentine's day so much he calls it "his spring". It was his idea to give 'Cain Heel' (Ren) a 'talisman' (Setsuka/Kyoko).
Reino (レイノ, Reino)
Voiced by: Shun Takagi (visual novel)
Reino is the lead singer in his band, Vie Ghoul. When he first met Kyoko, he snorts at her and states that she is plain. He was sent by his company to copy Shō Fuwa and take all his fans. Reino seems to have special powers to see ghost and apparitions and becomes intrigued with Kyoko when he catches one of her mini demons. Reino continually stalked Kyoko for a period of time, claiming that she will be his. He argued with both Shō and Ren because of Kyoko. Kyoko also seems to misunderstand Vie Ghoul's name referring to them as the "Beagles". Reino returns in chapter 138 for Valentine's Day expecting Kyoko to give him chocolates as a gesture of her love to him. It is also hinted in that same chapter that he is in love with Kyoko (he tells her that valentine's day is the day men receive chocolate from the women they are in love with, which is why he is expecting chocolates from her). Reino also claimed that Ren is tired of Kyoko running to him for help. He once held one of Kyoko's "apparitions" as hostage, affectionately calling it "pet". By using a special bracelet, he can make it visible to everyone, including Kyoko. He later returned it to her after he got the Valentines Day chocolates. Due to his spiritual powers, he was able to see Ren's past as Kuon and because of this he is afraid of Ren and wants nothing to do with him as he says that he (Ren) is a dangerous person.
Maria Takarada (宝田 マリア, Takarada Maria)
Voiced by: Hiromi Konno (Japanese); Mela Lee (English) (anime), Frances (live-action)
Maria is the granddaughter of the president of L.M.E. and used to use her cute appearance to get people's sympathy. She did so before Kyoko's audition; however Kyoko recognized this, and called her out on it. While some people would be angry at Kyoko, Maria began to idolize her, and views her as an ultimate big sister. Maria also suffered from a huge guilt complex from her believing that she is the cause of her mother's death. When she was five years old, Maria called her mom to come see her because she wanted to celebrate her birthday with her mother, since she (and her father) rarely bothered to before. Unfortunately, the plane that her mother took to return crashed, killing her. As a result, Maria was unable to talk or even be around her father, since she thought that he hated her. It didn't help that her father worked far away and never came to see her and that he voiced out loud to Lory at the funeral how he wished that Maria didn't call her mother. He tried reaching out to her in his own way, but it wasn't enough. Kyoko managed to make Maria understand that her father didn't hate her now, or think that Maria caused her mother's death. Maria also loves to dabble with black magic (alongside Kyoko) and has a large crush on Ren Tsuruga. Comically in the Christmas Special chapter, Kyoko's present for Maria was a 1/2-scale doll of Ren with different expressions (this shocking everyone else on how detailed she was).
Kuu Hizuri (クー・ヒズリ, Kuu Hizuri)
He is Ren's father and Julie's husband. He currently lives in America. He is also known by his former stage name, Shuuhei Hozu (保津 周平, Hozu Shuuhei). He acted as Katsuki in the original series of Dark Moon which coincidentally is the role Ren plays 20 years later. Kyoko is assigned to take care of him as a Love Me member. At first glance, Hizuri's character appears to be harsh but it is later revealed to be an act to get Kyoko to complain to Ren so that Ren will see him. Hizuri's goal is to get Ren to make a video of him as his "alter-ego", so to speak. Hizuri takes an instant liking to Kyoko and gives her very helpful acting advice. When Kyoko wanted to decline the roles that were "Mio" type roles because she didn't want to stick to just one role, Hizuri was the one who stopped her from doing so. He challenged her to do the role of his son "Kuon", giving a great number of adjectives to describe him (when Kyoko asked for only one). Kyoko's portrayal the role of "Kuon" stunned Hizuri and his son Ren. Kyoko grew closer to Hizuri in the time she spent "taking care" of him. Hizuri "adopts" her as his own child when she tells him her wish to continue being his "student". Kyoko shouted "Father" when Hizuri was departing to America and Hizuri embraced her and called her "Kuon". He received an appreciative glance from Ren which surprised him. His manner seems very similar to Ren's character.
Hiroaki Ogata (緒方啓文, Ogata Hiroaki)
Voiced by: Chris Patton (english) (anime)
He is the director of the Dark Moon drama. He was in the shadow of his father and believed that all his works were like copies of his father's work. His father is a famous director, who directed the original Tsukimori. Ogata was using Dark Moon to get rid of his father's shadow. Both Ren and Kyoko help him to accomplish this. He knows that both Ren and Sho are in love with Kyoko and wonders who Kyoko will choose.
Kyoko Apparitions (怨霊キョーコ, Onryō Kyōko)
Also known as Kyoko's demons. These vengeful ghosts were always with her, however they were kept at bay by her extreme love and devotion to Shō. When Shō's true impression of her came to light, so did these apparitions. The demons often scare everyone around her, which Kyoko uses to her benefit. They also help keep Kyoko's drive going, as she sometimes questions her motives for stardom. Most of the time, the demons are held back by Kyoko's remaining pure feelings whenever the "pure Kyoko" feels that the anger is getting out of line. The demons give Kyoko a dark aura that is frightening to passersby. She has also used them as kanashibari to trap Kanae Kotonami. Kyoko has also used them as projectiles to hit people. Whenever someone or something is emitting very negative emotions, Kyoko's demons would emerge to enjoy the hatred in the air. This behavior helps her identify when Ren is using the fake smile to hide his anger. Reino held one of these demons hostage in order to force Kyoko to give him chocolates for Valentine's by threatening to adore it from the bottom of his heart if she refused, much to Kyoko and the demon's horror. ("I'll hug it and nuzzle it and sleep with it.") There were also angels who looked like Kyoko from beginning of the series, but they were ultimately defeated and banished by the demons, who looked like Kyoko with the makeover and new hair-style.
Chiori Amamiya (天宮千織, Amamiya Chiori)
The third member of the LoveMe section. Unlike the first two members, Chiori volunteered herself to be placed in the department in order to rediscover the joy of acting. She thinks of Mogami Kyoko as an "Eternal Butterfly", the kind of actress that is able to immerse herself into any role she wishes to. Chiori has very little patience for people who do not earn their positions, and considers it an affront when someone (usually an actress) gains a role or popularity merely on the basis of their looks, especially when they have no talents to speak of. Chiori was once a child actress of amazing skill. However, a very dark role as Akari in "The Scarlet Dice", combined with an on-set accident that left her scarred, typecasted her into very dark and scary roles as a young girl, which in turn made her into a depressive and internally violent character. Because of this, she left acting for a while, eventually returning to the business after shedding her childhood stage name, Tendou Akari, in an attempt to escape her dark past and the typecasting. Her first impression is one of extreme vitriol, and she's been known to scribble threats and excessive criticism of colleagues in her "poison notebooks". She initially hates Kyoko and actually attacks her by pushing her down the stairs once. As time passes, Chiori seems to be letting go of her bitterness from her childhood and maturing as she becomes a better actress. She respects Kyoko greatly and is good friends with her. Her and Kanae also get along very well and share similar points of views. This is surprising since Kanae originally decided not to have any friends. Lory gave her the task of taking part in a comedy show, which she found humiliating and tried to use the excuse of her manager's injury to avoid it. With the help of Kyoko, she changed her attitude and now earnestly goes on the stage to be a comical person.
Hiou Uesugi (上杉陽桜, Uesugi Hiou)
An 11-year-old actor who appears much younger than his actual age. Kyoko at first believed he is the same age as Maria, who is in her second/third year of elementary school. He gets annoyed when people treat him as a child because he has been acting for nine years and comes from a long line of famous actors. At first, he is willing to use his family's influence in the entertaining world to destroy anyone who crossed him, such as targeting Kanae first and then Kyoko (the first for throwing him during a drama and the second for disrespecting him). His initial crush on Kanae has deepened and has gone so far as to protect her from a lecherous co-star since the man hates kids that appear to ride on their parents coattails. Hiou's grandfather runs a dojo and asks him to help train Kanae and Kyoko in fighting, which was needed for their auditions in an upcoming a drama set in feudal Japan. In addition, Hiou also asks his grandfather to be nice to Kanae which resulted in a huge difference in how he treats Kanae compared to Kyoko.

== Minor characters ==
Takenori Sawara (椹 武憲, Sawara Takenori)
Voiced by: Tomoyuki Kōno (drama CD), Kenji Hamada (japanese); Keith Silverstein (English) (anime), Charge Pu (live-action)
He is head of the talent section at L.M.E. and was tormented by Kyoko into getting her into an audition. Despite the initial meeting, he is actually very supportive of Kyoko, even through her penchant for tripping her own idol career up. Sawara continually misinterprets Kyoko's hate for Shō as extreme fandom. He also has a wife and daughter.
Nakazawa (中澤)
Voiced by: Joe Zieja (English) (anime)
Head of the singing section in the L.M.E., he was present during Kyoko's audition and acted as one of the judges. In the anime, he was the one who assigned Kyoko, as a member of the Love Me department, to the task of cleaning the hallway soiled with bubble gum spat everywhere by a disgruntled band that did not get accepted.
Matsushima (松島)
Voiced by: Kaiji Tang (English) (anime)
Head of the acting section in the L.M.E., he was present during Kyoko's audition and acted as one of the judges. In the anime, he was the one who assigned Kyoko, as a member of the Love Me department, to become Ren's manager in Yashiro's stead, who could not perform his duties due to colds.
Shoko Aki (安芸 祥子, Aki Shōko)
Voiced by: Karen Strassman (English) (anime)
Shoko Aki is Shō Fuwa's manager and implied lover. Before going to University, she has a passion for acting, but later realized that she is more capable of managing. She takes pride in her judgement and "knowing" Shō better than anyone else (except for Kyoko). Her relationship with Shō is rather flirtatious, but she encourages Shō's feelings towards Kyoko. Shoko misunderstands the LoveMe division in that she believes the members share love when really they are unable to love others. A running gag in the manga is that her well-meaning advice turns to devious ends once it is being misused or understood by Shōtaro.
Hidehito Kijima (貴島秀人, Kijima Hidehito)
Portrayed as a playboy, he has a noticeable interest in Kyoko since her makeover. He badgers Ren to give him details about her like her birthday but realizes Ren is in love with her.
