= Samurai Warriors 5 =

2021 video game

- Game cover featuring Nobunaga Oda (front), Mitsuhide Akechi (left), and Nō (right)
- Developer: Omega Force
- Publisher: Koei Tecmo
- Producer: Hisashi Koinuma
- Series: Samurai Warriors
- Engine: Katana Engine
- Platforms: Nintendo Switch; PlayStation 4; Xbox One; Windows
- Release: Switch, PS4, Xbox One: JP: June 24, 2021; WW: July 27, 2021; Microsoft Windows: WW: July 27, 2021
- Genre: Hack and slash
- Modes: Single-player, multiplayer

Samurai Warriors 5 (Note: Japanese: 戦国無双5, Hepburn: Sengoku Musou 5) is a hack and slash game by Koei Tecmo, and a reboot of the Samurai Warriors series, part of the long-running Warriors series of hack and slash games published by Koei Tecmo. As a "fresh re-imagining" of the franchise, the game features an all-new storyline, revamped character designs, and a new visual presentation. It was released in Japan in June 2021 for the Nintendo Switch, PlayStation 4, Xbox One, with a worldwide release in July for those platforms and PC via Steam. A version for Amazon Luna was made available on June 30, 2022.

== Gameplay ==
Like previous games, Samurai Warriors 5 is a hack and slash, in which the player faces against hundreds of enemy soldiers in a battlefield, with the objective usually being the defeat of an enemy commander. The game features a new Hyper Attack, which allows the player to traverse great distance while attacking enemies, and Ultimate Skill, augments that, depending on their type, can be used to continue combos, regenerate Musou Gauge, stun enemies, or deal a barrage of attacks. The game uses an art style resembling traditional Japanese painting.

== Story ==
The game's scope of the Sengoku period is limited in contrast to previous games. Samurai Warriors 5 focuses on events leading up to the Honnō-ji Incident, with Nobunaga Oda and Mitsuhide Akechi being the prominent figures of the story.

The story is divided between Nobunaga and Mitsuhide's POVs (referred to as Nobunaga's side and Mitsuhide's side). While Nobunaga's story focuses on his rise as an ambitious and charismatic underdog, and eventual death as the "Demon King" in Honnoji, Mitsuhide's story focuses on his personal friendships, relationship with Nobunaga and eventual falling out after Nobunaga refuses to send support to the Amago Clan, leading to their destruction by the Mori Clan.

The game introduces Mitsuki, a fictional kunoichi who is the orphaned daughter of Nobunaga's younger brother Nobuyuki Oda, who believes that Nobunaga is her real father and tries to win his approval by joining his cause while refusing to believe Nobunaga's continuous claims that he's not her father.

A major subplot is the mystery regarding the person inciting major rebellions against Nobunaga and Ieyasu Tokugawa following the fall of the Ashikaga Shogunate, which is eventually revealed to be the Iga ninja and Hanzo Hattori's friend Momochi Sandayu (a fictional character based on folklore) whose real motivation was the destruction of the Samurai-class. Momochi is later defeated by Ieyasu and Hanzo following Nobunaga's death but it's implied that he managed to cheat death.

Mitsuhide is later defeated by Hideyoshi Toyotomi at Yamazaki, with him dying from his wounds in Mitsuki's arms.

The game ends with both Hideyoshi and Ieyasu Tokugawa stating their desire to continue where Nobunaga left off and unite all of Japan, setting off their eventual rivalry.

== Characters ==
The entire cast of characters has been vastly redesigned from previous incarnations (with the exception of Katsuyori Takeda, who retains his original design from Samurai Warriors: Spirit of Sanada). The number of playable characters has also been cut when compared to the previous mainline game, Samurai Warriors 4 (which featured 55 playable characters), with only 37 playable characters being featured, 21 returning and 16 new (10 of the characters are supporting characters which means that they are not playable in Story Mode, and do not have unique Power Attacks, and a unique Ultimate Skill).

* Denotes supporting characters who are not playable in Story Mode, and do not feature unique Power Attacks, and a unique Ultimate Skill
** Denotes characters with two playable versions consisting of Youth, and Mature counterparts

SW	SW2	SW3	SW4	SW5
Hanzō Hattori	Ieyasu Tokugawa	Hanbei Takenaka	Hisahide Matsunaga	Dōsan Saitō*
Hideyoshi Hashiba	Katsuie Shibata	Kanbei Kuroda	Katsuyori Takeda*	Fujihide Mitsubuchi*
Kenshin Uesugi	Nagamasa Azai	Motonari Mōri	Takakage Kobayakawa	Kazuuji Nakamura
Magoichi Saika	Toshiie Maeda			Mitsuki
Mitsuhide Akechi**				Motoharu Kikkawa*
Nobunaga Oda**				Motonobu Okabe*
Nō				Nobuyuki Oda*
Oichi				Sandayū Momochi
Shingen Takeda				Sena
Tadakatsu Honda				Shikanosuke Yamanaka
Yoshimoto Imagawa				Terumoto Mōri*
				Toshimitsu Saitō
				Yasuke
				Yoshiaki Ashikaga*
				Yoshikage Asakura*
				Yoshitatsu Saitō*

== Music ==
Unlike the electronic and traditional Japanese music collaborations in the previous Samurai Warriors games, Samurai Warriors 5 largely replaces the electronic music in favor of rock and orchestral music, while keeping the traditional Japanese music entirely intact.

== Reception ==
Reception

Aggregate score
Aggregator	Score
Metacritic	NS: 78/100; PC: 74/100; PS4: 75/100; XONE: 77/100

Review scores
Publication	Score
Famitsu	35/40
IGN	7/10
Nintendo Life	8/10
Nintendo World Report	7/10
Push Square	8/10
Shacknews	8/10

Samurai Warriors 5 has received "generally favorable" reviews according to Metacritic, becoming the highest rated entry in the series. Famitsu gave all versions of the game scores of 9/9/8/9 for a total of 35/40. The game sold a total of 94,366 physical copies during its first week on sale in Japan (PS4: 55,675/Switch: 38,691) with the PS4 version being the second best-selling game of the week, and the Switch version being the third best-selling game of the week.
