= Monkey Turn =

Japanese manga series by Katsutoshi Kawai and its anime adaptation

- Manga volume 1 cover

モンキーターン (Monkī Tān)
- Genre: Sports
- Manga
- Written by: Katsutoshi Kawai
- Published by: Shogakukan
- Imprint: Shōnen Sunday Comics
- Magazine: Weekly Shōnen Sunday
- Original run: August 21, 1996 – January 1, 2005
- Volumes: 30
- Anime television series

Monkey Turn / Monkey Turn V
- Directed by: Katsuhito Akiyama
- Written by: Atsuhiro Tomioka
- Music by: Daisuke Ikeda
- Studio: OLM
- Original network: TV Tokyo
- Original run: January 10, 2004 – December 18, 2004
- Episodes: 50

Monkey Turn (Japanese: モンキーターン, Hepburn: Monkī Tān) is a Japanese manga series written and illustrated by Katsutoshi Kawai. It was serialized in Shogakukan magazine Weekly Shōnen Sunday from August 1996 to January 2005, with its chapters collected in 30 tankōbon volumes. The manga spawned two anime television series adaptations, Monkey Turn and Monkey Turn V, which were both produced by OLM and aired on TV Tokyo in 2004, totalling 50 episodes.

Monkey Turn won the 45th Shogakukan Manga Award in the shōnen category in 2000.

== Plot ==
The series follows Kenji Hatano, a young man who sets out to master the world of kyōtei (hydroplane racing). Over the course of the series he develops a serious rivalry with fellow racer Hiro Doguchi.

== Characters ==
Kenji Hatano (波多野 憲二, Hatano Kenji)
Initially a high school student who was dreaming of being a professional baseball player, Hatano quits after losing a match against another school. His coach, who sees talent in Hatano, then introduces him to the world of motorboat racing. Hatano promises to become the top racer in Japan within three years. He realizes this feat by mastering the "monkey turn," a high-speed cornering technique used in boat racing.
Takehiro Doguchi (洞口 雄大, Dōguchi Takehiro)
Hatano's principal rival. His style of racing is much reviled by other racers on the circuit.
Sumi Ubukata (生方 澄, Ubukata Sumi)
Hatano's childhood friend and romantic interest. She is very supportive of Hatano and attends all of his races.

== Media ==
=== Manga ===
Monkey Turn was written and illustrated by Katsutoshi Kawai. It was serialized in Shogakukan's Weekly Shōnen Sunday from August 21, 1996, to January 1, 2005. Shogakukan collected its chapters in thirteen tankōbon volumes, published from February 18, 1996, to February 18, 2005.

=== Anime ===
Monkey Turn was adapted into a 25-episode anime television series by OLM, Inc., which aired on TV Tokyo from January 10 to June 26, 2004. A second 25-episode season, titled Monkey Turn V, was broadcast from July 3 to December 18, 2004.

== Reception ==
The manga series won the 45th Shogakukan Manga Award in the shōnen category in 2000.
