= Samurai Warriors: Chronicles =

2011 video game

- European cover art
- Developer: Omega Force
- Publisher: Tecmo Koei
- Series: Samurai Warriors
- Platform: Nintendo 3DS
- Release: JP: February 26, 2011; EU: March 25, 2011; NA: March 27, 2011; AU: March 31, 2011
- Genre: Hack and slash
- Modes: Single-player, multiplayer

Samurai Warriors: Chronicles (戦国無双 クロニクル, Sengoku Musō Kuronikuru) is a hack and slash video game developed by Omega Force and published by Tecmo Koei for the Nintendo 3DS. It was released as a launch title in Japan in February 2011, and in Europe, North America and Australia in March.

== Gameplay ==
Samurai Warriors: Chronicles introduces several new features not included in prior Samurai Warriors games. While the top screen displays the main game, the bottom screen is used to display maps, KOs, and mission data. A player can switch between four characters during battle, switching the screen to their respective locations as well.

Unlike previous titles, where the player chooses one character and focuses on his or her story, in Chronicles the player chooses a male (wielding a katana and rifle) or female (wielding dual swords) character to play as a primary character in every story battle, following his or her own story and changing around different armies. Each battle also allows the player to have one to four (depending on the battle) side characters to switch between during the battle. Before a stage is cleared these are fixed on certain characters related to the story. After the mission has been cleared once, the player can change these characters out to any characters that have been unlocked for free play. Every character taking place in a battle receives XP, and the weapons found during the mission are divided out according to the player's choosing between these characters.

== Characters ==
Every playable character from Sengoku Musō 3: Moushouden/Z is playable in this game. There is a story mode that follows all the events in Samurai Warriors 3. There are no separate story lines for game characters, but game characters that star in the battle can be played. The two new officers, the main Hero and the main Heroine, are brand new original characters to the series, fully customizable by the player. The player will use either of them for all of the game (unless they replay the stage in which case all unlocked characters can be chosen), while switching control to the other returning officers during battles.

== Development ==
Samurai Warriors: Chronicles was first revealed during E3 2010 as Samurai Warriors 3D as a part of the Nintendo 3DS line-up. The game was subsequently renamed Samurai Warriors: Chronicles, which occurred during Tokyo Game Show 2010.

== Reception ==
Reception

Aggregate scores
Aggregator	Score
GameRankings	63%
Metacritic	61/100

Review scores
Publication	Score
Destructoid	6/10
Edge	6/10
Eurogamer	5/10
Game Informer	5/10
GamePro	3.5/5
GameSpot	4.5/10
IGN	5/10
Nintendo Life	5/10
Nintendo Power	7/10
Nintendo World Report	7/10

Samurai Warriors: Chronicles was met with mixed reception upon release; GameRankings gave it a score of 63%, while Metacritic gave it 61 out of 100. The game sold 49,327 copies within its first week of release in Japan.

== Legacy ==
The game was followed by two sequels. The first, Sengoku Musō Chronicles 2nd (戦国無双 クロニクル 2nd, Sengoku Musō Kuronikuru 2nd) was released only in Japan on September 13, 2012, also for the Nintendo 3DS. Being an overhaul of the original game, it has the same general storyline and several of the characters' movesets with expanded content. It features multiple story paths for the two protagonists, new events for returning characters, and a new competitive multiplayer mode akin to Challenge Mode. It also introduces three new characters: Munenori Yagyū, Naotora Ii, and Takatora Tōdō, all of whom would also be introduced to the main series starting on Samurai Warriors 4. In addition, several characters from other games in the Warriors series make appearance as NPCs.

The second, Samurai Warriors Chronicles 3 (戦国無双 クロニクル 3, Sengoku Musō Chronicles 3) features new scenarios and systems as well as over 50 characters from Samurai Warriors 4. It was released for the 3DS as well as the PlayStation Vita in Japan on December 4, 2014. Samurai Warriors Chronicles 3 has also been released digitally in Europe and North America in June 2015.

Both Sengoku Musō Chronicles 2nd and Samurai Warriors Chronicles 3 support the Circle Pad Pro when played on the Nintendo 3DS.
