= Samurai Warriors 4 =

2014 video game

- Game cover featuring Yukimura Sanada and Nobuyuki Sanada
- Developer: Omega Force
- Publisher: Koei Tecmo
- Director: Osamu Mieda
- Producer: Hisashi Koinuma
- Designer: Myamosu Iko
- Series: Samurai Warriors
- Platforms: PlayStation 3; PlayStation Vita; PlayStation 4; Windows; Nintendo Switch
- Release: Original: PS3, PS Vita, PS4; JP: March 20, 2014; JP: September 4, 2014 (PS4); NA: October 21, 2014; AU: October 23, 2014; EU: October 24, 2014; DX; Nintendo Switch, PS4; JP: March 14, 2019; Windows; WW: May 14, 2024; II: PS3, PS4, PS Vita; JP: February 11, 2015; NA: September 29, 2015; PAL: October 2, 2015 Windows; WW: September 29, 2015; Empires: PS3, PS4, PS Vita; JP: September 17, 2015; PAL: March 11, 2016; NA: March 15, 2016
- Genre: Hack-and-slash
- Modes: Single-player, multiplayer

Samurai Warriors 4 (Note: Japanese: 戦国無双4, Hepburn: Sengoku Musou 4) is a 2014 hack and slash game by Koei Tecmo for PlayStation 3, PlayStation 4, and PlayStation Vita, and the sequel to Samurai Warriors 3. Unlike past Samurai Warriors games, this one only has Japanese voice overs.

A revised version of the game titled Samurai Warriors 4-II (Note: Japanese: 戦国無双4-II, Hepburn: Sengoku Musou 4-II) was released the following year in 2015 for PlayStation 3, PlayStation 4, PlayStation Vita, and Windows via Steam. This version features Naomasa Ii as a playable character, an improved Story Mode which focuses on the various characters, Survival Mode, upgrade to action balance, cut-scenes and character development system.

An enhanced version of the games titled Samurai Warriors 4 DX (Note: Japanese: 戦国無双DX, Hepburn: Sengoku Musou 4 DX) was released for Nintendo Switch and PlayStation 4 in Japan in 2019, and for Windows (via Steam) worldwide with Japanese and English support in May 2024. This edition contains more than 150 previously released DLC from Samurai Warriors 4, including costumes, weapons, customization parts, scenarios, and background music.

A reboot of the series titled Samurai Warriors 5 was released in June and July 2021 for Nintendo Switch, Windows, PlayStation 4, and Xbox One.

== Development ==
Samurai Warriors 4 was made to celebrate the tenth anniversary of the series. While the game was confirmed to be in development for the PlayStation 3 as early as 2012, it was not until the SCEJA Press Conference in September 2013 that the game was officially announced, with a version for PlayStation Vita in addition to PlayStation 3, and was released on March 20, 2014, in Japan. The PlayStation 4 version port followed on September 4, 2014, and was later released for North America and Europe in October.

A revised version, Samurai Warriors 4-II (戦国無双4-II, Sengoku Musō 4-II) was released in 2015 on February 11 in Japan, in North America on September 29, and in Europe on October 2, but it does not contain the original stories from Samurai Warriors 4. A second expansion, Samurai Warriors 4: Empires (戦国無双4 Empires, Sengoku Musō 4 Empires) was released in Japan on September 17, 2015, and in North America and Europe in 2016.

== Gameplay ==
Samurai Warriors 4 features character-switching, similar to the spin-off, Samurai Warriors: Chronicles, with which players can take two characters into battles simultaneously, and freely switch between the two.

Two new moves, "Hyper Attacks" and "Rage Mode" are featured in this game:

- Hyper Attacks is a secondary moveset available to all characters that allows the player to sweep through and clear out crowd of enemies with a dashing animation, although it is useless against enemy officers, as they will either deflect it or are otherwise immune against it.
- Rage Mode renders the player invincible for a period of time, and also enhances the player's attacks as well as empowering their Musou attack by using the Spirit Gauge.

Duels are featured, which occur when player-controlled characters meet with enemy officers under specific conditions. The create-a-warrior mode is retained; it features much more expansive content, including the addition of two weapon movesets from the male and female protagonists from Samurai Warriors: Chronicles in addition to the three from previous games. Custom characters can also be played in the new "Chronicle Mode", where players can take requests for their custom generals. There is also an option that allows players to turn off female characters.

Story Mode is also revamped; it no longer uses the traditional story-per-character format from previous games and instead features ten stories based on clans and regions during the Sengoku period, akin to the kingdom-based story mode implemented in the recent Dynasty Warriors games.

Each stage offers a selection of playable characters for the player to use according to their participation in the battles; consequently, some characters do not appear in the story, although they still appear in the aforementioned Chronicle Mode. All of the stories lead to two separate stories: the "Unification", which mainly tells the conquest of Japan by Hideyoshi Toyotomi as well as the conflicts between the Eastern and Western armies after Hideyoshi's death that leads to the Battle of Sekigahara and the rise of the Tokugawa shogunate; and the "Sanada" story, a parallel story with Unification that focuses on the Sanada clan.

Musou Attacks now have new finishing animations separate from their True Musou, but they no longer allow free-action for their durations. Enemy generals still use the older shockwave finishers, and are no longer fully invincible for their durations (they instead are granted Hyper Armor).

== Story ==
Like previous games in the series, the setting and story of Samurai Warriors 4 are centered on the Sengoku period of Japan, a period of much military conflict and political warfare in which Japan was divided between regions ruled by daimyō that lasted from the middle of the 16th century to the early 17th century. The events depicted, however, are romanticized, and may or may not be factual; for example, Nobuyuki Sanada and his brother, Yukimura Sanada, are shown to participate in the battle of Kawanakajima, even though both of them had not yet been born at that time. Many figures with little relevancy to the period, particularly women who for the most part stayed out of battles, have larger roles; Koshōshō, notable for being Motochika Chōsokabe's wife in real life, becomes his primary rival in his conquest of Shikoku and is the representative of the Miyoshi clan in-game. Unlike the previous games, there are no hypothetical routes; as a result, the fates of the characters are played out as history stated.

The earliest battle depicted in the game is the battle of Itsukushima, fought between the Mōri clan and the Ōuchi clan in 1555, with the siege of Osaka, fought between the Tokugawa clan and the Toyotomi clan in 1614–1615, as the closing battle of the game.

== Characters ==
The original game features a total of 55 characters. Virtually all characters from previous games return, including three characters (Goemon Ishikawa, Kojirō Sasaki, and Musashi Miyamoto) that were cut from the main series in Samurai Warriors 3 (in Samurai Warriors 2 for Goemon). Three characters: Munenori Yagyū, Naotora Ii, and Takatora Tōdō also make their debut in the main series here after having been introduced in the spin-off Sengoku Musou: Chronicle 2; they are counted as new characters in promotional materials.

In addition to returning characters, the game also introduces nine new characters, some of whom are former generic non-playable officers. Other than full playable characters, several generic officers can be made pseudo-playable by recruiting them as partners in Chronicle Mode.

The II update adds Naomasa Ii to the roster, bringing the character count to 56.

* denotes characters added in expansions
Bold denotes characters who are available by default

SW	SW2	SW3	SW4
Goemon Ishikawa	Ginchiyo Tachibana	Aya	Hisahide Matsunaga
Hanzō Hattori	Gracia	Hanbei Takenaka	Kagekatsu Uesugi
**Hideyoshi Toyotomi**	Ieyasu Tokugawa	**Kai**	Kojūrō Katakura
Ina	Kanetsugu Naoe	Kanbei Kuroda	Koshōshō
**Keiji Maeda**	**Katsuie Shibata**	Kiyomasa Katō	**Lady Hayakawa**
Kenshin Uesugi	Kojirō Sasaki	Masanori Fukushima	Naomasa Ii*
**Kunoichi**	**Kotarō Fūma**	**Motonari Mōri**	**Nobuyuki Sanada**
Magoichi Saika	Mitsunari Ishida	Munenori Yagyū	**Takakage Kobayakawa**
Masamune Date	Motochika Chōsokabe	Muneshige Tachibana	Toyohisa Shimazu
Mitsuhide Akechi	Musashi Miyamoto	Naotora Ii	Yoshitsugu Ōtani
**Nobunaga Oda**	Nagamasa Azai	Takatora Tōdō	
**Nō**	Nene	**Ujiyasu Hōjō**	
**Oichi**	**Sakon Shima**		
Okuni	**Toshiie Maeda**		
Ranmaru Mori	Yoshihiro Shimazu		
**Shingen Takeda**			
Tadakatsu Honda			
Yoshimoto Imagawa			
**Yukimura Sanada**			

== Reception ==
=== Samurai Warriors 4 ===
Reception

Aggregate scores
Aggregator	Score
GameRankings	(PS4) 79.19%
Metacritic	(PS4) 76/100 (PSV) 76/100

Review scores
Publication	Score
Destructoid	8/10
Famitsu	34/40
Hardcore Gamer	3.5/5

The game has received positive reviews, at the time becoming the highest rated entry in the series (until the release of Samurai Warriors 5 in 2021), with Famitsu giving a score of 34 out of 40 in both PlayStation 3 and PlayStation Vita versions. During the first week of release in Japan, the PS3 version of the game sold 120,452 physical retail copies, ranking second place amongst all Japanese software sales within that week, whilst the PS Vita version sold 39,597 physical retail copies. The PS4 version, meanwhile sold 11,757 physical retail copies during its first week of release in Japan.

=== Samurai Warriors 4-II ===
Reception

Aggregate score
Aggregator	Score
Metacritic	(PS4) 73/100

Review scores
Publication	Score
Famitsu	36/40
IGN	(Spain) 6/10

Samurai Warriors 4-II has received average reception, scoring 73 out of 100 for the PlayStation 4 version on Metacritic. During the debut week of the release in Japan, the updated version of the original games has sold 44,574 units on PS3, 23,519 units on PS Vita and 22,468 units on PS4.

== Related media ==
=== Spin-offs and expansions ===
The game's cast of characters and visuals are used in Sengoku Musou Shoot (戦国無双 シュート, Sengoku Musō Shūto), a social spin-off game released on April 22, 2014, for the mobile phones also to commemorate the series' 10th anniversary. Koei Tecmo collaborated with the Japanese Racing Association (JRA) to release Derby Musō (ダービー無双) on May 25, 2014, for the PC. Derby Musō reuses assets from Samurai Warriors 4 to create a horse racing game, like that of the Winning Post series, with famous Japanese racehorses. Eight characters from Samurai Warriors 4 make up the playable cast, plus Matthew C. Perry (known in-game as just Perry).

The game received a revision, titled Samurai Warriors 4-II (戦国無双4-II, Sengoku Musō 4-II), which was released in 2015 for Japan on February 11, in North America on September 29, and in Europe on October 2. It is described as neither a continuation nor an Xtreme Legends expansion like previous games; instead, it provides a "different" focus of the same game. Players choose a character as their protagonist for a selected scenario, which has a different progression depending on the character selected. Dream Castle Mode, first introduced in Samurai Warriors: Chronicles 3 is also present in the game. The game adds one new character, Naomasa Ii, to the character roster. A second expansion, Samurai Warriors 4: Empires (戦国無双4 Empires, Sengoku Musō 4 Empires) was released in Japan on September 17, 2015, for the PlayStation 3, PlayStation 4, and PlayStation Vita, with a release in North America and Europe in 2016. The gameplay focuses more on strategy as in other Empires expansions, with players issuing commands and taking suggestions to and from their subordinate military officers. A new "Resident Domestic Administration" was added. Featuring more than 100 generic officers, including female officers, it incorporates the marriage system for the first time, which sister series Dynasty Warriors had also implemented in their Empires expansions. The game does not add a new character, but in return, many more new events, such as interactions between characters, were added. The game is also supported by DLC costumes for all characters (in the original game, the focus of DLC costumes is only on the female characters).

Sengoku Musō 4 DX (戦国無双4 DX) was released in March 2019 in Japan for the PlayStation 4 and Nintendo Switch. It includes over 150 DLC previously released for the game, including costumes, weapons, customization parts, and others. A "15th Anniversary" edition is also available, which includes an art book, a soundtrack and music video set, and a postcard set. The game was released worldwide with additional English support on PC Steam.

=== Anime ===
An animated TV special titled Samurai Warriors Special: Legend of the Sanada (戦国無双SP ～真田の章～, Sengoku Musō SP ~Sanada no Shō~) aired on March 21, 2014, as part of the series' 10th anniversary, directed by Kōjin Ochi and animated by TYO Animations with screenplay provided by Yuka Yamada. It features the original cast from the game series. It is based on an early battle in the game, namely, the siege of Ueda castle between the Sanada clan and the Tokugawa clan, featuring Yukimura Sanada and Nobuyuki Sanada as the main characters, and Tadakatsu Honda, Mitsunari Ishida, Kanetsugu Naoe, Kunoichi, Ina, and Ieyasu Tokugawa in supporting roles. The ending of the special, which features cameos by Kagekatsu Uesugi and Nobunaga Oda, teases a full anime adaptation, simply titled Samurai Warriors, again directed by Kojin Ochi and animated by TYO Animations, which aired between January 11 and March 29, 2015, for 12 episodes in total. It goes beyond the siege of Ueda castle and covers the entire timeline of the game starting from the siege of Odawara castle, and ending on the Osaka campaign, though it notably focuses on the Sanada clan. More characters are thus featured in the anime, including Hidetada Tokugawa and Hideyori Toyotomi, both of whom received new character designs since both have never been playable in any game of the series.
