= Neko =

Neko (ネコ or ねこ or 猫, cat) may refer to:

== People ==
- 4Batz (born 2003), American R&B singer, called Neko Bennett
- Neko Case (born 1970), American singer-songwriter
- Neko Hiroshi (born 1977), Japanese comedian
- Néko Hnepeune (born 1954), New Caledonian politician
- Neko Nitta (born 1978), Japanese retired professional wrestler
- Neko Oikawa, Japanese lyricist
- Neko Saito, (斎藤ネコ) (born 1959), Japanese violinist, conductor, composer and music arranger

== Characters ==
- Neko (K), an anime character from The K Project
- Neko Fukuta, a character in Hakobune Hakusho
- Neko, a non-player character in the Mana series of role-playing games
- Neko Kuroha, an anime character in Brynhildr in the Darkness
- Nekomusume or catgirl, a female character in Japanese anime and manga

== Manga ==
- Neko Majin, Japanese one-shot manga series
- Neko Rahmen, Japanese four-panel comic strip manga
- Neko ni Tensei Shita Oji-san, Japanese manga series
- Neko no Otera no Chion-san, Japanese manga series
- Neko to Watashi no Kinyōbi, Japanese manga series

== Technology ==
- Neko (software), a cat screenmate application
- Neko Atsume, is a mobile cat-collecting game
- Neko Entertainment, a video-game developer and publisher
- NekoVM is a virtual machine developed by Nicolas Cannasse

== Music ==
- Neko Jump, was a pop duo band in Thailand
- Neko nas posmatra, is the seventh and final studio album by Ekatarina Velika
- Neko ni Fūsen, Ai Otsuka's 9th single

== Other uses ==
- Néko, a village in Ivory Coast
- Neko language, a Trans–New Guinea language
- Neko, a submissive role in a relationship between females in yuri or shōjo-ai media
- Neko-dera, a name for Buddhist temples in Japan that are associated with cats
- Neko chigura, is a kind of cat house made of straw in Japan
- Neko Harbour, is an inlet of the Antarctic Peninsula on Andvord Bay

== See also ==
- Necco, a candy factory near Boston
  - Necco Wafers, a traditional American confection made by Necco
- Necho (disambiguation)
- Nekomusume (disambiguation)
- Niko (disambiguation)
