= Madō no Keifu =

Japanese manga series

- First tankōbon volume cover

魔導の系譜
- Genre: Fantasy
- Manga
- Written by: Sakura Satō
- Illustrated by: Hiro Inuzuka
- Published by: Mag Garden
- Magazine: Mag Comi
- Original run: September 25, 2019 – October 25, 2023
- Volumes: 6

Madō no Keifu (Japanese: 魔導の系譜; 'Truth Weavers') is a Japanese manga series adapted from the light novel of the same name written by Sakura Satō and illustrated by Hiro Inuzuka. It was serialized on Mag Garden's Mag Comi manga website from September 2019 to October 2023, with its chapters collected in six volumes, the first two volumes in tankōbon and the third to sixth volumes in Kindle edition.

== Publication ==
Adapted from the light novel of the same name written by Sakura Satōand and illustrated by Hiro Inuzuka, Madō no Keifu was serialized on Mag Garden's Mag Comi website from September 25, 2019, to October 25, 2023. Mag Garden collected its chapters in six volumes, the first two in tankōbon published from February 10, 2020, to August 7, 2020, and the third to sixth volumes in Kindle edition from March 10, 2021, to December 8, 2023.

In France, the manga is licensed by Komikku Editions.

=== Volumes ===
| No. | Release date | ISBN |
|---|---|---|
| 1 | February 10, 2020 | 978-4-80-000940-1 |
| 2 | August 7, 2020 | 978-4-80-001002-5 |
| 3 | March 10, 2021 (Kindle edition) | — |
| 4 | November 10, 2021 (Kindle edition) | — |
| 5 | August 9, 2022 (Kindle edition) | — |
| 6 | December 8, 2023 (Kindle edition) | — |
