= More Starlight to Your Heart =

Japanese manga series

- Cover of the third volume

もっと☆心に星の輝きを (Motto Kokoro ni Hoshi no Kagayaki o)
- Genre: Historical; Romantic comedy
- Manga
- Written by: Hiro Matsuba
- Published by: Mag Garden
- English publisher: NA: ADV Manga
- Magazine: Monthly Comic Blade
- Original run: 2002 – 2005
- Volumes: 8
- Manga

Zoku Kokoro ni Hoshi no Kagayaki o
- Written by: Hiro Matsuba
- Published by: Mag Garden
- Published: March 10, 2010
- Volumes: 1
- Manga

Shin Kokoro ni Hoshi no Kagayaki o
- Written by: Hiro Matsuba
- Published by: Mag Garden
- Magazine: Web Comic Beat's
- Original run: May 10, 2011 – March 10, 2013
- Volumes: 2

More Starlight to Your Heart (Japanese: もっと☆心に星の輝きを, Hepburn: Motto Kokoro ni Hoshi no Kagayaki o) is a Japanese manga series written and illustrated by Hiro Matsuba. It was serialized in Mag Garden's Monthly Comic Blade magazine from 2002 to 2005, with its individual chapters collected into eight volumes. A sequel, titled Zoku Kokoro ni Hoshi no Kagayaki o, was published in March 2010. Another sequel, titled Shin Kokoro ni Hoshi no Kagayaki o, was serialized in Web Comic Beat's from May 2011 to March 2013, with its individual chapters collected into two volumes.

== Plot ==
Set in the Heian period of Japanese history, the manga follows the adventures of Akane, the daughter of a high-ranked official, who enters the imperial court as a servant in order to be closer to her beloved Aogi.

== Publication ==
Written and illustrated by Hiro Matsuba, the series began serialization in Mag Garden's Monthly Comic Blade magazine's April 2002 issue; it is a sequel to one of Matsuba's previous works. The series completed serialization in the June 2005 issue of Monthly Comic Blade. The series' individual chapters were collected into eight tankōbon volumes. A one-volume sequel written by Matsuba, titled Zoku Kokoro ni Hoshi no Kagayaki o (続 心に星の輝きを), was published by Mag Garden on March 10, 2010. Another sequel, titled Shin Kokoro ni Hoshi no Kagayaki o (新 心に星の輝きを), began serialization on Mag Garden's Web Comic Beat's website on May 10, 2011. It completed its serialization on March 10, 2013. Its individual chapters were collected into two tankōbon volumes.

ADV Manga published the series in English.

== Reception ==
Liann Cooper of Anime News Network felt the plot was similar to those of shōjo manga, but nonetheless praised its artwork and characters. Megan Lavey of Mania praised the emphasis on historical accuracy in the setting. Lavey also liked the story, describing the manga as "an enjoyable read". In Manga: The Complete Guide, Jason Thompson felt the historical setting was "interesting", but nonetheless described the story as "bland".
