= Our Not-So-Lonely Planet Travel Guide =

Japanese manga series

- First tankōbon volume cover

僕らの地球の歩き方 (Bokura no Chikyū no Arukikata)
- Genre: Boys' love
- Manga
- Written by: Mone Sorai
- Published by: Mag Garden
- English publisher: NA: Tokyopop
- Magazine: Mag Comi
- Original run: December 30, 2019 – September 2, 2025
- Volumes: 7
- Manga

Bokura no Tabi no Yukusaki wa
- Written by: Mone Sorai
- Published by: Mag Garden
- Magazine: Mag Comi
- Original run: July 7, 2026 – present

Our Not-So-Lonely Planet Travel Guide (僕らの地球の歩き方, Bokura no Chikyū no Arukikata) is a Japanese manga series written and illustrated by Mone Sorai. It was serialized on Mag Garden's Mag Comi website from December 2019 to September 2025, with its chapters collected in seven volumes.

== Synopsis ==
Asahi Suzumura has just quit his job, and has decided to go on a world tour with his boyfriend Mitsuki Sayama. The duo made a vow together that once their world tour ends, they will get married once they return to Japan.

== Publication ==
Written and illustrated by Mone Sorai, Our Not-So-Lonely Planet Travel Guide was serialized on Mag Garden's Mag Comi manga website from December 30, 2019 to September 2, 2025. Its chapters were collected in seven tankōbon volumes released from July 14, 2020, to November 14, 2025. The series is licensed by Tokyopop for English publication.

A manga spin-off titled, Bokura no Tabi no Yukusaki wa began serialization on Mag Comi on July 7, 2026.

=== Volumes ===
No.	Original release date	Original ISBN	North American release date	North American ISBN
1	July 14, 2020	978-4-80000-995-1	April 20, 2021	978-1-42786-755-1
1. "JPN"; 2. "THA"; 3. "THA"; 4. "IND"; 5. "GEO"; 6. "GEO"; Bonus: "JPN"
2	May 14, 2021	978-4-80001-072-8	February 20, 2022	978-1-42786-850-3
7. "FIN"; 8. "DEU"; 9. "DEU"; 10. "DEU"; 11. "FRA"; 12. "ITA"; 13. "ITA"; 14. "ITA"
3	February 14, 2022	978-4-80001-175-6	January 19, 2023	978-1-42787-253-1
15. "GBR"; 16. "GBR"; 17. "GBR"; 18. "GBR"; 19. "ESP"; 20. "ESP"; 21. "MAR"; Bonus: "ESP"
4	December 14, 2022	978-4-80001-278-4	September 4, 2023	978-1-42787-502-0
22. "BRA"; 23. "BRA"; 24. "BRA"; 25. "BRA"; 26. "BRA"; 27. "ARG"; 28. "BOL"; 29. "BOL"
5	November 14, 2023	978-4-80001-390-3	June 25, 2024	978-1-42787-912-7
30. "PER"; 31. "PER"; 32. "PER"; 33. "PAN"; 34. "MEX"; 35. "MEX"
6	November 14, 2024	978-4-80001-390-3	June 24, 2025	978-1-42788-076-5
36. "New Mexico"; 37. "New Mexico"; 38. "New Mexico"; 38.5. "New Mexico"; 39. "California"; 40. "Arizona"; 41. "New York"
7	November 14, 2025	978-4-80001-660-7	June 30, 2026	978-1-42788-296-7
42. "CAN"; 43. "CAN"; 44. "SYD"; 45. "SYD"; 46. "CNS"; 47. "CNS"; 48. "AYQ"; 49. "JPN"; Extra

== Reception ==
The series' third volume was listed in the Young Adult Library Services Association's "Great Graphic Novels for Teens" list in 2024. The series' seventh volume was nominated for the Best Continuing Manga category at the 3rd American Manga Awards in 2026.
