= Beyond the Beyond (manga) =

Manga by Yoshitomo Watanabe

- Cover of the original Japanese release of the first volume Beyond the Beyond

その向こうの向こう側 (Sono Mukō no Mukōgawa)
- Genre: Adventure, Fantasy
- Manga
- Written by: Yoshitomo Watanabe
- Published by: Mag Garden
- English publisher: NA: Tokyopop; SG: Chuang Yi
- Magazine: Monthly Comic Blade
- Original run: March 2004 – February 2008
- Volumes: 6

Beyond the Beyond (その向こうの向こう側, Sono Mukō no Mukōgawa) is a Japanese manga series written and illustrated by Yoshitomo Watanabe. The story is about Futaba Kudo, a young boy who is pulled into a strange world when he rescues a girl named Kiara, a powerful girl whom many people wish to capture or kill. Futaba pledges to protect Kiara from her pursuers and help her find her missing master. The series first premiered in Japan in the monthly shōnen magazine Comic Blade in 2004, where it ran until February 2008. The individual chapters were collected and published in six tankōbon volumes by Mag Garden.

Tokyopop licensed the series for an English language release in North America, but cancelled the series after releasing four volumes.

== Plot ==
Sixth grader Futaba Kudo is short for his age with three extremely overprotective older siblings. As he's walking home from school one day, a strange girl, named Kiara, falls from the sky, calling Futaba her master. While Futaba is trying to figure out what is going on, a woman appears and attempts to kill Kiara. After trying to perform a spell and oddly sniffing Futaba's hand, Kiara realizes that Futaba is not her master. Kiara and Futaba run from the attacking creature and hide under a bridge. While under the bridge, Futaba's cell phone rings and Kiara borrows it and drops it into the river, opening a mysterious portal. They jump into the portal, narrowly escaping the monster and arriving in a fantasy-like world.

Futaba pledges to help Kiara find her master and protect her, while also searching for a way to return to his own world. They meet Lady Belbel, a rabbit-like magician who hates being called a rabbit. A powerful-magic user who decides to travel with them. Futaba learns that Kiara is actually not human but a flower called the "Amaranthine", and is much sought after because she has incredible powers that can only be activated by her master. She can also communicate with other flowers, plants, and at brief moments with her master. Kiara and Futaba make a deal that if he helps her find her master, she will ask her master to send him home when their quest is complete.

They eventually meet Virid Visette Viridian, also known as the "Mad" Prince Virid. The younger of twin princes of the land of Viridian, he was locked away since birth because the land does not need two princes and his mother prefers his older twin. At the age of thirteen, he is to battle his brother in a duel-to-the-death to determine the winner. His older brother released him from his cell with a message from his mother: "If you find the Amaranthine and bring it to me, you can both live." He finds Futaba and Kiara. However, before he can attack them, he is attacked by assassins sent to kill him. He kills both but is injured himself. Futaba finds him while trying to find water for Kiara and after a talk, and Virid seeing Futaba's kind nature, he instead joins them, wanting to stay at Futaba's side.

Now the group of four are on a quest to find Kiara's master and trying not to get killed along the way.

== Media ==
=== Manga ===
Written by Yoshitomo Watanabe, Beyond the Beyond premiered Monthly Comic Blade in the March 2004 issue. The thirty-fifth, and final, chapter was published in the February 2008 issue. The individual chapters were collected and published in six tankōbon volumes by Mag Garden, with the first volume published in April 2004; the final volume was released in June 2008. Each volume was also released in limited edition versions that featured different covers and additional items, such as CDs.

The series was licensed for an English language release in North America by Tokyopop in 2005. The first volume was released in January 2006; as of August 2007, four volumes have been released. The fifth English volume was solicited for release in September 2008, but the release was cancelled in July 2008. The series is also being released in English in Singapore by Chuang Yi under the title There, Beyond the Beyond; as of June 2008, it has released five volumes of the series, but due to licensing issues will not be releasing the sixth. Tokyopop also released German translations of its first four volumes of the series in Germany.

==== Volume list ====
No.	Original release date	Original ISBN	North America release date	North America ISBN
1	April 10, 2004	4861270383	June 13, 2006	978-1-59816-371-1
Chapter 1: The Way Back Home to Where You Fell From; Chapter 2: A Shortcut for the Long Way; Chapter 3: Birds That Won't Fly / Birds That Can't Fly; Chapter 4: The House Deep Inside the Forest; Chapter 5: Those Who Pick the Flowers
2	October 9, 2004	4861270839	October 10, 2006	978-1-59816-372-8
Chapter 6: Temptation; Chapter 7: The City That Reflects on the Surface of the Water; Chapter 8: Pottage of Lentils; Chapter 9: Even If It Is a Little Flower, It Is Still a Flower; Chapter 10: What a Little Light Wishes For; Chapter 11: After the Dream
3	July 8, 2005	4861271630	February 10, 2007	978-1-59816-857-0
Chapter 12: The Me That I Don't Know Is Me; Chapter 13: It Is Impossible To Fly; Chapter 14: Red Thunder; Chapter 15: Wizard's Apprentice; Chapter 16: Those Who Drown; Chapter 17: In the Mist; Chapter 18: Heart-hugging; Extra Chapters
4	October 10, 2005	4861273161	August 14, 2007	978-1-4278-0452-5
Chapter 19: Tears; Chapter 20: The Other Side; Chapter 21: Colorful forest; Chapter 22: Dream I Had a Long Time Ago; Chapter 23: Happy Item; Chapter 24: The Wing's Whereabouts; Chapter 25: You on the Other Side
5	October 10, 2007	4861274389	Canceled	978-1-4278-1280-3
6	June 10, 2008	4861275067	—	—

=== Other ===
A desk-top calendar featuring art work from the series was released in Japan on October 29, 2005.
