= Comic Blade Brownie =

Japanese manga magazine

- Cover image of January 2009 (Vol. 1) issue of Comic Blade Brownie featuring a character from docca. Illustration by Yoshitomo Watanabe.
- Categories: Shōnen and Shōjo manga
- First issue: December 2008
- Final issue: 2009
- Company: Mag Garden
- Country: Japan
- Based in: Tokyo
- Language: Japanese
- Website: Official website (archived)

Comic Blade Brownie (コミックブレイドブラウニー, Komikku Bureido Burauni) was a special Japanese spin-off magazine of Monthly Comic Blade published by Mag Garden that would feature both shōnen manga and shōjo manga, aiming at both boys and girls. The first issue was released on December 10, 2008. The release of the second issue, however, was postponed for unknown reasons.

== Serialized Manga ==
- 404 Not Found (Aya Sakamaki)
- Akumagari ~Uriel Gaiden~ (Seiuchirou Todono)
- docca (Yoshitomo Watanabe)
- Ima, Naguri ni Yukimasu (Moyamu Fujino)
- Kagerou Nostalgia ~ Shin Shou (Satomi Kubo) (from Monthly Comic Blade)
- Boukyaku no Cradle (Amnesia:Cradle) (Moyamu Fujino)
- Kodoku (Min Chishima, art by Machiko Mutou)
- Kodoku Gaiden (Machiko Mutou)
- Kyoraku Legion (Rin Asano)
- Nobunaga Santo (Miho Takano)
- R² [rise R to the second power] (Maki Hakoda) (from Monthly Comic Blade)
- Rosetta Kara no Shoutaijou (Neko Asari, art by Hajime Sato)
- Susukaburi (Kemuri Karakara)
