= Petals of Reincarnation =

Japanese manga series

- First tankōbon volume cover, featuring Haito Luo Buffett

リィンカーネーションの花弁 (Rīnkānēshon no Kaben)
- Genre: Action, supernatural
- Manga
- Written by: Mikihisa Konishi
- Published by: Mag Garden
- English publisher: NA: Mangamo
- Imprint: Blade Comics
- Magazine: Monthly Comic Blade; (May 30 – July 30, 2014); Comic Blade; (September 1, 2014 – December 25, 2015); Mag Comi; (December 25, 2015 – present)
- Original run: May 30, 2014 – present
- Volumes: 24
- Anime television series
- Directed by: Shun Kudō; Kōsuke Murayama (assistant)
- Produced by: Kouta Yoshimoto; Akiko Tarumi; Tetsuya Endou; Sayoko Hashizume; You Nakamura; Yutaka Kashiwagi
- Written by: Atsuo Ishino
- Music by: Kohta Yamamoto
- Studio: Benten Film
- Licensed by: Sentai Filmworks; SA/SEA: Medialink
- Original network: Tokyo MX, BS NTV, AT-X, CBC
- Original run: April 3, 2026 – June 26, 2026
- Episodes: 13
- icon

Petals of Reincarnation (Japanese: リィンカーネーションの花弁, Hepburn: Rīnkānēshon no Kaben) is a Japanese manga series written and illustrated by Mikihisa Konishi. It began serialization in Mag Garden's Monthly Comic Blade magazine in May 2014. After the magazine published its final issue in July, the series was transferred to the Comic Blade website in September that same year.

An anime television series adaptation produced by Benten Film aired from April to June 2026.

== Plot ==
The story follows the protagonist, Touya Senji, who joins the "Forest of the Greats" to fight against a rival organization, the "Sinners", who resurrect infamous and evil historical figures. The story explores identity, morality, and the struggle between embracing a past life and forging a new future.

== Characters ==
=== Main characters ===
Tōya Senji (扇寺東耶, Senji Tōya) / Ishikawa Goemon (石川五右衛門)
Voiced by: Shōya Chiba (Japanese); Stephen Alcalá (English)
A high schooler who has an excellent academic record, but with an inferiority complex over a lack of talent, which dates back to the time when his brother still lived. He got his hands on an artifact that allows him to gain a talent from an important person out of the entire history.
Haito Luo Buffett (灰都・ルオ・ブフェット, Haito Ruo Bufetto) / Miyamoto Musashi (宮本武藏)
Voiced by: Wakana Maruoka (Japanese); Ginger Sue (English)
A mysterious girl with gray hair and eyes. She is Touya's classmate, but does not attend school very often. She was invited to the kendo club as a scholarship student and is a master swordsman feared by those around her. She has a bright and combative personality and sometimes even enjoys fighting.

=== Forest of the Greats ===
John V. Neumann (ジョン・V・ノイマン, Jon V. Noiman)
Voiced by: Ayane Sakura (Japanese); Jessica Boone (English)
A girl who is always seated in a wheelchair. She is the leader of the group of wanderers known as the Forest of the Greats, whose goal is "world peace," and is one of the original members. Contrary to her youthful appearance, she is always calm, composed, and rational, and single-handedly takes charge of the chain of command for her comrades.
I. Newton (I・ニュートン, I・Nyūton)
Voiced by: Kaito Ishikawa (Japanese); Benjamin McLaughlin (English)
He possesses both the talent to fight and calm judgment, making him one of the two strongest alongside Einstein. For some reason, when he gets hurt, he shouts out the name of an apple variety.
A. Einstein (A・アインシュタイン, A Ainshutain)
Voiced by: Haruka Shiraishi (Japanese); Elissa Cuellar (English)
One of the original members of the Forest of the Greats. She primarily handles combat and movement, and is considered one of the two strongest alongside Newton. She has a strong dislike for men, to the point of being reluctant to even see other women interacting with men.
F. Nightingale (F・ナイチンゲール, F Naichingēru)
Voiced by: Reina Ueda (Japanese); Kristen McGuire (English)
A demure woman with long bangs that conceal her eyes. At the Forest of the Greats, she is mainly in charge of treating her fellow patients. She sometimes uses her talents by touching patients in a lewd manner during treatment, which has led Neumann to call her a "lustful nurse."
Jubei Mitsuyoshi Yagyu (柳生十兵衞三厳, Yagyū Jūbē Mitsuyoshi)
Voiced by: Marina Inoue (Japanese); Natalie Rial (English)
A woman wearing an eyepatch over her left eye. A member of the Forest of the Greats, she fights using the sword she carries at her waist as her weapon. A warrior who travels throughout the country, confronting traveling sword masters in various regions, in pursuit of the ultimate mastery of swordsmanship.
Hiroshi Funasaka (舩坂弘, Funasaka Hiroshi)
Voiced by: Shugo Nakamura (Japanese); Tyler Galindo (English)
A young man with an expressionless face and few words. He is the foremost combatant of the Forest of the Greats, having stood on and devastated battlefields around the world, but because he is immortal, he has little fear of death. He has a single-minded personality and speaks with a distinctive way of ending his sentences, "~de arimasu" (a formal, archaic way of saying "it is").
E. Schrödinger (E・シュレーディンガー, E Shurēdingā)
Voiced by: Jun Fukuyama (Japanese); Brandon Hearnsberger (English)
A gentleman with the appearance of a cat. A member of the Forest of the Greats, he fights using a handgun as his weapon. Although his shooting skills are low, he can inflict fatal wounds on his opponents by combining them with his talent.
P. Picasso (P・ピカソ, P Pikaso)
Voiced by: Chiemi Tanaka (Japanese); Cynthia Martinez (English)
H. Driesch (H・ドリーシュ, H Dorīshu)
Voiced by: Shinya Takanashi
Charles R. Darwin (チャールズ・R・ダーウィン, Chāruzu R Dāuin)
Voiced by: Ryunosuke Watanuki (Japanese); John Gremillion (English)
B. Fischer (B・フィッシャー, B Fisshā)
Voiced by: Toshiyuki Toyonaga (Japanese); Bobby Haworth (English)
S. Häyhä (S・ヘイヘ, S Heihe)
Voiced by: Riho Sugiyama (Japanese); Kara Greenberg (English)
Jean H. Fabre (ジャン・H・ファーブル, Jan H Fāburu)
Voiced by: Makoto Koichi (Japanese); Gabriel Regojo (English)
W. Wright (W・ライト, W Raito) and O. Wright (O・ライト, O Raito)
Voiced by: Aina Suzuki (W.) and Miharu Hanai (O.) (Japanese); Karlii Hoch (English)
Nobel (ノーベル, Nōberu)
Voiced by: Yoshinori Shimomura
N. Tesla (N・テスラ, N Tesura)
Voiced by: Kohsuke Toriumi
Yuri A. Gagarin (ユーリイ・A・ガガーリン, Yūrii A Gagārin)
Voiced by: Hiromu Mineta
Seiya Senji (扇寺西耶, Senji Seiya) / Leonardo da Vinci (レオナルド・ダヴィンチ, Reonarudo Davuinchi)
Voiced by: Miyu Irino (Japanese); Ty Mahany (English)
Tōya's deceased brother who became a Returner. He was a founding member of the Forest of the Greats.
Albert (アルベルト, Aruberuto)
Voiced by: Misaki Kuno
A Returner who claims to be the true reincarnation of Albert Einstein.

=== Sinners ===
A. Hitler (A・ヒトラー, A Hitorā)
Voiced by: Ayumu Murase (Japanese); Sarah Wiedenheft (English)
One of the Five Tiger Generals of the Sinners. A wanderer with overwhelming analytical and strategic thinking abilities, possessing a talent described as "omniscient."
Xiang Yu (項扇羽, Kōsenu)
Voiced by: Katsuyuki Konishi (Japanese); Aaron Campbell (English)
He is a wandering warrior with unparalleled martial arts talent and the leader of the Sinners, a group of wandering criminals. He is an enemy of the Forest of the Greats, but he is a mysterious figure who knows the origins of the Forest of the Greats.
M. D'Armont (M・ダルモン, M Darumon)
Voiced by: Miyu Tomita (Japanese); Molly Searcy (English)
A close associate of Xiang Yu, a member of the Sinners. A quiet woman who is always by Xiang Yu's side.
Pol T. (ポル・T, Poru T)
Voiced by: Masaaki Mizunaka (Japanese); Luis Galindo (English)
One of the Five Tiger Generals of the Sinners. A silent, expressionless wanderer with overwhelming offensive power and talent.
Hans U. Rudel (ハンス・U・ルーデル, Hansu U Ruderu)
Voiced by: Daisuke Namikawa (Japanese); Mike Yager (English)
One of the Five Tiger Generals of the Sinners. Possessing the talent of "unchanging immortality," he is a wanderer who finds himself bored.
Carlos N. Hathcock (カルロス・N・ハスコック, Karurosu N Hasukokku)
Voiced by: Takahiro Sakurai (Japanese); Adam Gibbs (English)
A sniper with an appearance covered in white feathers. He defected from the Forest of the Greats.
M. Nostradamus (M・ノストラダムス, M Nosutoradamusu)
Voiced by: Shūhei Sakaguchi (Japanese); Jay Hickman (English)
A strategist in the Sinners, wearing a bird-beak mask. He possesses a "book of prophecy" that allows him to foresee the future.
Gaius J. Caesar (ガイウス・J・カエサル, Gaiusu J Kaesaru)
Voiced by: Yūsuke Kobayashi (Japanese); Houston Hayes (English)
One of the Five Tiger Generals of the Sinners. He was sent to spy on the Forest of the Greats.
Albert H. Fish (アルバート・H・フィッシュ, Arubāto H Fisshu)
Voiced by: Tomokazu Seki (Japanese); Chris Hutchison (English)
Vlad III (ヴラド三世, Vurado Sansei)
Voiced by: Kenyu Horiuchi (Japanese); Jeremy Gee (English)
John W. Gacy (ジョン・W・ゲイシー, Jon W Geishī)
Voiced by: Hironori Kondo (Japanese); Rob Mungle (English)
Edward T. Gein (エドワード・T・ゲイン, Edowādo T Gein)
Voiced by: Kosuke Echigoya (Japanese); John Swasey (English)
A. DeSalvo (A・デサルボ, A Desarubo)
Voiced by: Hironori Kondo (Japanese); Cyrus Rodas (English)
Andrei R. Chikatilo (アンドレイ・R・チカチーロ, Andorei R Chikachīro)
Voiced by: Kosuke Echigoya (Japanese); Adam Gibbs (English)
Charles J. Whitman (チャールズ・J・ホイットマン, Chāruzu J Hoittoman)
Voiced by: Hiroyuki Endo (Japanese); Kyle Colby Jones (English)
Wild B. Hickok (ワイルド・B・ヒコック, Wairudo B Hikokku)
Voiced by: Yuki Ishikari (Japanese); Ty Mahany (English)
Okada Izō (岡田以蔵)
Jahangir (ジャハーンギール, Jahāngīru)
Voiced by: ??? (Japanese); Brittney Karbowski (English)

=== Duckweed ===
Gottfried V. Berlichingen (ゴッドフリード・V・ベルリヒンゲン, Gottofurīto V Berurihingen)
Voiced by: Masaaki Mizunaka
J. Henri (J・アンリ, J Anri)
Voiced by: Sora Tokui
Joshua A. Norton (ジョシュア・A・ノートン, Joshua A Nōton)
Voiced by: Kosuke Echigoya
Carl V. Linné (カール・V・リンネ, Kāru V Rin'ne)
Voiced by: Anna Mugiho
August F. Möbius (アウグスト・F・メビウス, Augusuto F. Mebiusu)
Voiced by: Hiroyuki Endo
Franz A. Mesmer (フランツ・A・メスメル, Furantsu A Mesumeru)
Leo L. (レオ・L, Rio L)
Kotaro Honda (本多光太郎, Honda Kōtarō)
Voiced by: Yoshinori Shimomura
Wallace H. Carothers (ウォーレス・H・カロザース, Uōresu H Karozāsu)
Voiced by: Yuina Yamada

=== Other characters ===
Itsuki Kitazuka (北束斎, Kitazuka Itsuki)
Voiced by: Yoshimasa Hosoya (Japanese); Joe Daniels (English)
He is the captain of the Self-Defense Force's Black Edge Unit and a close friend of Touya's older brother, Seiya. He is skilled in martial arts and is strong enough to subdue Haito after she has been reincarnated as Musashi. He claims to be the strongest human. He is investigating the Returners in order to uncover the truth behind Seiya's disappearance.
Yoshiki Minami (三並南毅, Minami Yoshiki)
Voiced by: Natsuki Hanae (Japanese); Shannon Emerick (English)
He is a member of the SDF's Black Edge Unit and the head of the "Traveler" Research Lab. He supports Kitazuka with his extensive knowledge and advanced engineering skills, but he often conducts experiments without regard for safety for the sake of research. He can cry out when extremely upset.
Alan Smithee (アラン・スミシー, Aran Sumishī)
Voiced by: Nobuo Tobita
The creator of the Branches of Reincarnation. An entity of unknown origin.

== Media ==
=== Manga ===
Written and illustrated by Mikihisa Konishi, Petals of Reincarnation began serialization in Mag Garden's Monthly Comic Blade magazine on May 30, 2014. After the magazine published its final issue on July 30 that same year, the series was transferred to the Comic Blade website on September 1. Its chapters have been collected in 24 tankōbon volumes as of July 2026. The series is set to end with the release of its 25th volume. The series is licensed digitally in English by Mangamo.

No.	Release date	ISBN
1	November 10, 2014	978-4-8000-0376-8
2	May 9, 2015	978-4-8000-0453-6
3	October 10, 2015	978-4-8000-0505-2
4	March 10, 2016	978-4-8000-0542-7
5	September 10, 2016	978-4-8000-0613-4
6	June 9, 2017	978-4-8000-0693-6
7	December 9, 2017	978-4-8000-0735-3
8	July 10, 2018	978-4-8000-0787-2
9	January 10, 2019	978-4-8000-0821-3
10	August 10, 2019	978-4-8000-0882-4
11	January 10, 2020	978-4-8000-0929-6
12	August 7, 2020	978-4-8000-1000-1
13	January 9, 2021	978-4-8000-1042-1
14	July 9, 2021	978-4-8000-1109-1
15	January 8, 2022	978-4-8000-1165-7
16	August 7, 2022	978-4-8000-1225-8
17	January 10, 2023	978-4-8000-1284-5
18	July 10, 2023	978-4-8000-1348-4
19	January 10, 2024	978-4-8000-1412-2
20	August 7, 2024	978-4-8000-1481-8
21	February 10, 2025	978-4-8000-1552-5
22	August 8, 2025	978-4-8000-1626-3
23	April 10, 2026	978-4-8000-1731-4
24	July 9, 2026	978-4-8000-1777-2

=== Anime ===
An anime television series adaptation was announced on August 1, 2024. The series was produced by Benten Film and directed by Shun Kudō, with Kōsuke Murayama serving as assistant director, Atsuo Ishino handling series composition, Haruna Katō designing the characters and Kohta Yamamoto composing the music. It aired from April 3, to June 26, 2026, on Tokyo MX and BS NTV. The opening theme song, "Glitch", is performed by eill, while the ending theme song, "ZERO", is performed by Sizuk. The series is also co-produced by Sentai Filmworks and streamed on Hidive. Medialink licensed the series in South and Southeast Asia for streaming on Ani-One Asia's YouTube channel. An English dub directed by Kyle Colby Jones premiered on HIDIVE on May 13, 2026.

==== Episodes ====
No.	Title	Directed by	Written by	Storyboarded by	Original release date
1	"Those Who Shed Petals"; Transliteration: "Hanabira o Chirasu Mono-tachi" (Japanese: 花弁を散らす者達)	Tetsuya Watanabe	Atsuo Ishino	Hiromitsu Kanazawa & Kentarō Azuma	April 3, 2026
Toya Senji is a high school student desperate to find a talent of his own. However, one night, he is attacked by a serial killer named Fish, but is saved by classmate Haito Luo Buffet. Haito uses a special knife called the Branch of Reincarnation to call upon the talent of one of her past lives, Miyamoto Musashi. As Haito battles Fish, Haito's superior Neumann explains to Toya that individuals who successfully achieve reincarnation are called "Returners", with Returners being divided between "Greats" who use their talents for good and "Sinners" who use their talents for evil. Haito defeats and kills Fish, while Toya takes a Branch of Reincarnation and uses it on himself despite the risk of death. Toya survives the process, and confides to Haito that he's desperate for talent due to always being compared to his late older brother Seiya. Neumann recruits Toya into the Forest of the Greats and tasks both him and Haito to gather intelligence on the Sinner Vlad III. Haito starts a battle with Vlad, but ends up being overpowered until Toya uses his talent, Hand of the Thief, to steal Vlad's talent. A mysterious force orders Vlad to retreat, and Neumann concludes the mission. Later that night, Vlad confronts Toya, demanding the return of his talent, but Toya instead kills him with his own talent. Toya then declares he will steal every talent he can so he can surpass Seiya. Meanwhile, Neumann muses that everything is going according to plan, and it is revealed she knows Seiya as well.
2	"The Way of the Returner"; Transliteration: "Motsu Mono Toshite no Arikata" (Japanese: 持つ者としての在り方)	Raita Sunaga	Atsuo Ishino	Hiromitsu Kanazawa	April 10, 2026
The next day, Toya and Haito are ordered to eliminate the Sinner Gacy, a serial killer dressed as a clown. Haito easily kills Gacy while a squad of soldiers spy on them from a distance. That night, a team of Greats, including Haito, Newton, Ein, Funasaka, and Driesch hunt down and kill the Sinner Gein. Neumann congratulates the team on their successful mission while Nightingale heals Funasaka's wounds. While most of the Greats welcome Toya to their ranks, Ein remains suspicious due to the nature of his talent. Toya and Haito return to his apartment and meet, Itsuki Kitazuka an old friend of Seiya's who is a martial arts expert and JSDF special forces soldier. Annoyed at Kitazuka's taunts, Toya and Haito reveal they are Returners, which only spurs him to insult them for relying on someone else's talent like a crutch. He then takes his leave and it is revealed he is leading the soldiers spying on the Returners. Haito confides to Toya that she was an orphan who was adopted by a kendo master. She was so desperate to have talent at swordfighting she became a Returner, but accidentally crippled her adoptive father. She plans to return home once she becomes a Complete Returner and stay as Musashi permanently. Feeling a kinship with Hatio, Toya shows her the true nature of his talent, and they promise to battle each other in the future to decide who has the superior talent. Elsewhere, Kitazuka confronts a Returner being held in his custody who has the power to predict the future.
3	"Declaration of War"; Transliteration: "Kaisen" (Japanese: 開戦)	Takahiro Tamano & Honoka Uehara	Atsuo Ishono	Hiromitsu Kanazawa	April 17, 2026
The captured Returner tells Kitazuka he achieved his objective in making the JSDF Black Ops aware of the existence of Returners and takes his leave, fending off their attacks. Meanwhile, the "King of Returners" contacts the Forest of the Greats, declaring war on them for trying to suppress evil talents when all talent should be free. Neumann explains the King of Returners is actually Xiang Yu, a former founder of the Forest of the Greats who is currently the most powerful Returner that now leads the Sinners. She further explains the Sinners plan to recreate every historical disaster all at once. With Xiang Yu having exposed himself, Neumann orders the Forest of the Greats to mobilize to fight him and his Sinner army. The Greats have great success in the initial wave of the attack, easily defeating the Sinners they encounter. Toya is teamed up with Funasaka and Fabre and they easily take out their opponent. Upon learning Fabre's talent is invisibility, Toya begins thinking of a way to steal it while Neumann secretly tasks Funasaka with keeping an eye on Toya due to his suspicious behavior. Meanwhile, the Greats suffer their first loss when the Wright Brothers are killed by White Feather, which cuts off communications. Xiang Yu then orders his four of his Tiger Generals to attack. Funasaka hesitates when he loses contact with Neumann, forcing Toya to use his talent to save him. However, Funasaka recognizes Toya's talent as one belonging to a Sinner and accuses him of being a spy.
4	"All-Knowing and Corruption"; Transliteration: "Zenti to Huhai" (Japanese: 全知と腐敗)	Nao Miyoshi	Tatsuhiko Urahata	Hiromitsu Kanazawa	April 24, 2026
Under pressure, Toya reveals the true nature of his talent and his desire to steal talents to surpass his brother. Toya's honestly is enough to convince Funasaka he can be trusted, as he can tell Toya has a good heart despite desiring talents. Funasaka also admits he doesn't remember why he desired a talent, as he has lost all his memories as a human. They then progress to the Earth Fort, which is defended by Rudel the Phoenix. Funaska decides to battle him, as they both have talents that make them immortal. Meanwhile, Hayha is challenged to a sniper duel by White Feather, who promises will reveal why he joined the Sinners. Elsewhere, Hitler and Pol T use the former's analytical talent and latter's corruption talent to kill Fabre, Darwin, Schrodinger, and Fischer. Hitler knows Ein can teleport but only to places she has personally traveled, while Newton figures out Hitler's seeming omniscience is due to spying on them through seals bearing his mark. Since Newton hasn't used his talent yet at all, he banks on it being their trump card. Back at the Earth Fort, Toya continues to watch Funasaka battle Rudel, confused as to why Funaska keeps throwing himself into battle.
5	"Farewell, Hearkening Soul"; Transliteration: "Sayōnara, Mimi o Katamukete Kureta Hito" (Japanese: さようなら、耳を傾けてくれた人)	Mineo Ōe	Tatsuhiko Urahata	Hiromitsu Kanazawa & Kentarō Azuma	May 1, 2026
Toya tries to convince Funaska to stop fighting, but Funasaka realizes what he truly desires is to fight a battle where he can truly die. Rudel agrees, pointing out how since they are both Complete Returners, they have no memories of their former lives, and therefore cannot escape the curse of their talents. Rudel also reveals he was ordered by Xiang Yu not to harm Toya, since as a Incomplete Returner, Toya still retains his human memories and therefore still has the potential to surpass his talent. Funasaka and Rudel then declare they will fight each other to the death for their own enjoyment rather than anybody else's cause. Meanwhile, Hathcock and Hayha end up mutually killing each other in their sniper duel. Haito storms another fort with Jubei and Caesar, only for Caesar to stab Jubei in the back and reveal he is the fifth Tiger General who had been spying on the Greats. Enraged, Haito attacks Caesar. In the forest, Hitler and Polt get the upper hand on Ein and Newton, but decide to spare them since they still possess their humanity. Hitler reveals they were only targeting Greats who are consumed by their talents. As Hitler and Polt destroy themselves, they warn Ein and Newton not to trust Neumann. They both confront Neumann about the real reason she declared war on the Sinners, only for Newton to be brainwashed by Nightingale and turn on Ein. Back at the Earth Fort, both Funasaka and Rudel are mortally wounded when their talents run out of energy. Rudel instructs Toya on how to reach Xiang Yu before dying, and Funasaka insists Toya steal his talent to use against Xiang Yu, which Toya reluctantly does. After passing a graveyard commemorating all of the Greats and Sinners who have died in the battle, Toya finally comes face to face with Xiang Yu.
6	"Seiya"; Transliteration: "Seiya" (Japanese: 西耶)	Tamano Takahiro Kobayashi & Shigeta Kobayashi	Atsuo Ishino	Hiromitsu Kanazawa	May 8, 2026
After a brief battle, Xiang Yu quickly overpowers Toya but spares his life, revealing that he and Seiya used to be friends, and that Seiya was also a Returner and fellow founder of the Forest of the Greats. Xiang Yu then shows his past with Seiya to Toya. Many years ago, Seiya became a Returner and inherited the talent of Leonardo da Vinci, allowing him to learn and master other talents. Initially, he just wanted to be a big brother Toya would be proud of, but Xiang Yu jokingly suggested he should try to achieve world peace, which Seiya agreed to. Seiya, Xiang Yu, Neumann, Ein, and Picasso ended up being the founding members of the Forest of the Greats, and Xiang Yu also arranged to have his Sinner followers join as well. However, Toya was attacked and nearly killed by a Sinner, causing Seiya to declare all Sinners must be eliminated. Xiang Yu dared Seiya to kill him first since he was a Sinner, and became enraged when Seiya hesitated, exposing his hypocrisy. Xiang Yu mortally wounded Seiya, who teleported them both to safety before the other Greats could intervene. Seiya apologized to Xiang Yu before dying, with the latter realizing Seiya was manipulated by Neumann. Back in the present, Toya's view of Seiya has completely changed, and he thanks Xiang Yu for showing him the memory. Xiang Yu then explains that he plans to allow all Sinners to be eliminated, including himself, and warns Toya to watch out for Neumann. Caesar then arrives with a wounded Jubei, chased by an enraged Haito who has awakened her full power.
7	"Reblooming Reincarnation"; Transliteration: "Saki Mawaru Ryinkānēshon" (Japanese: 咲き廻るリィンカーネーション)	Nao Miyoshi	Atsuo Ishino	Hiromitsu Kanazawa	May 15, 2026
Caesar and Nostradamus hold off Haito to buy time for Xiang Yu to prepare his attack. Haito kills both Returners, but Xiang Yu is able to trap her in his Omni-Receptacle and force her back to human form. Unwilling to see Haito die, Toya uses his arm to "steal" Haito and rescue her. Xiang Yu then teleports everybody to Kitazuka's secret base. Haito and Jubei are taken for medical treatment, while Neumann makes an announcement to the world that she and the Forest of the Greats plan to cull humanity to eliminate all Sinners once and for all and achieve world peace. She then has several Greats perform acts of mass destruction all over the world as a demonstration of their power before giving a grace period of three months before enacting her plan. Newton begins to resist his brainwashing, and realizes that Neumann is also being mind controlled by Nightingale, who is the true mastermind since she has a secondary talent that allows her to mind control anybody that she heals. Back at the secret base, Xiang Yu offers to let Toya steal his talent since he was mortally wounded by Ein and won't live much longer, but having learned the truth about Seiya, Toya decides to fight without having to rely on other people's talents. Satisfied, Xiang Yu entrusts Toya and his friends to save humanity and takes his leave to die alongside his lover d'Armont.
8	"Savior"; Transliteration: "Kyuuseishu" (Japanese: 救世主)	Chikara Inari	Tatsuhiko Urahata	Hiromitsu Kanazawa	May 22, 2026
As Haito and Jubei are being treated for their injuries, Toya offers to help Kitazuka fight the Forest of Greats, but he flatly turns him down. While he claims humanity must defeat the Returners with their own power, Kitazuka in reality is secretly testing Toya's resolve. Unsure of what to do next, Toya remembers Neumann once warning him not to turn on his phone if it has no network connection. He does exactly that, and discovers Neumann secretly implanted AI copies of herself in the Greats' phones as a failsafe feature. The AI Neumann, Neumann Mark-II, agrees to help Toya, and determines that the original Neumann is actually resisting Nightingale's control, since there's no other reason for her giving a three month grace period unless it's to buy time for humanity. Kitazuka then starts receiving reports of Returners appearing all over the world and engaging in combat with human militaries. Neumann Mark-II points out that there are many neutral Returners who see the Forest of the Greats' declaration of war as an opportunity to reveal themselves. Toya then volunteers to confront a Returner who has been kidnapping Kitazuka's men, and correctly deduces that it is Ein, who survived being attacked by Newton.
9	"All Begins and Ends at the Seed"; Transliteration: "Tanete Hajimari, Owari Ari" (Japanese: 種にて始まり、終わり有り)	Takahiro Tamano	Atsuo Ishino	Hiromitsu Kanazawa	May 29, 2026
Ein is brought back to the base, where she, Haito, and Jubei agree to appoint Toya as their leader. Kitazuka and Minami then meet with Toya, with Minami proposing a theory that the Branches of Reincarnation must come from a singular source thanks to clues left behind by Nostradamus. Neumann Mark-II admits that she never considered the possibility that someone may be creating the Branches and distributing them. Minami posits that the "Seed of Reincarnation" must exist, and if it is destroyed, will eliminate all Returners. Kitazuki adds that if they can neutralize Rogue Returners and take their Branches, they can use them to pinpoint the location of the Seed. Toya agrees to the plan and informs the other Returners, which angers Haito since she believes he forgot about their promise. She escapes the base, and Toya and Jubei give chase. Ein decides to stay behind and asks Minami to create a prosthetic leg while plotting to take the Seed to save the mind controlled Greats. Learning Ein is still alive, Nightingale allows Albert, another reincarnation of Einstein, to take Newton to hunt her down. At the beach, Haito is approached by a mysterious faceless man who introduces himself as Alan Smithee.
10	"The Faceless Man"; Transliteration: "Kao no Nai Otoko" (Japanese: 顔の無い男)	Nao Miyoshi	Tatsuhiko Urahata	Takanari Satō	June 5, 2026
Ein and Kitazuka try to look for rogue Returners they can subdue, but Ein is frustrated at their lack of firepower. Kitazuka reveals that they still have several of Xiang Yu's followers who had turned themselves in and are willing to fight on their side. However, as they arrive, they notice Alan Smithee has somehow arrived along with them. Elsewhere, Toya and Jubei also encounter Alan Smithee and he also appears in the Forest of the Greats to meet Nightingale. He reveals he is the creator and distributor of the Branches of Reincarnation, and confirms the existence of the Seed to Kitazuka and restores Jubei's memories as a human. However, when he disappears, everybody loses all memory of him except for Kitazuka who stabs his own hand to keep his focus, and Jubei who relives the destruction of her dojo and defeat at the hands of Haito, who had lost control of her Returner abilities at the time. Nightingale surmises Alan Smithee's existence due to losing one hour of memories, and decides to go into hibernation to collect more power while she orders the Greats to wait for her reawakening. Jubei leads Toya to the ruins of Haito's family dojo, where they find Haito in despair since she has learned her father has been long dead. Having lost her purpose, Haito no longer has the will to live, and Jubei gladly offers to end her life in order to get revenge on her.
11	"Tattered Talent"; Transliteration: "Sakareru Sai" (Japanese: 裂かれる才)	Tetsuya Watanabe	Tatsuhiko Urahata	Hiromitsu Kanazawa	June 12, 2026
Jubei engages in battle with Haito, who begins to fight back due to being possessed by her talent against her will. Thanks to a combination of her superior sword skills and her talent that allows her to speed up her reaction time, Jubei is able to maintain the upper hand despite Haito's significant advantage in pure strength. However, the side effects of her talents and her wounds cause Jubei to collapse mid battle, and Haito halts the fight since she does not fight unarmed opponents. Toya and Jubei withdraw, and Jubei explains Haito is consumed by her desire to attain more power, so the only way to free her is to defeat her in battle. Due to her condition, Jubei cannot fight Haito again, so she promises to train Toya to get him ready in three days, offering to let him steal her talent. Meanwhile, Ein leads leads the allied Returners in slaying the Three Conquistadors and taking their Branches. However, Ein is suddenly ambushed and captured by Albert and Newton. Albert proclaims herself the true reincarnation of Albert Einstein, and reveals that Nightingale is currently hibernating and vulnerable. She says she is willing to give away the location of their base if Ein's allies can land a single hit on her, before suddenly attacking them.
12	"Till My Voice is Heard"; Transliteration: "Koe ga Todoku Made" (Japanese: 声が届くまで)	Tōru Yoshida	Atsuo Ishino	Shun Kudō, Kentarō Azuma, Tōru Yoshida & Hiromitsu Kanazawa	June 19, 2026
Albert engages in battle with the allied Returners and is quickly able to defeat them all. She then focuses on torturing Ein in an attempt to force her to concede that she is the true reincarnation of Einstein. Seeing that Albert is unwilling or unable to kill Ein and the allied Returners, Kitazuka and his men intervene, distracting Albert and Newton long enough for Ein and the allied Returner to be safely evacuated. Kitazuka and his men then directly engage Albert in combat to buy time. Meanwhile, Toya completes his training under Jubei, though he decides to only steal Jubei's special sight rather than her sword skills out of respect to her, as well as due to his desire to defeat Haito with his own strength. Toya then challenges Haito to a duel and uses his training to focus on defending against Haito's attacks in a effort to wear her down in a battle of attrition so he can have a heart to heart conversation with her.
13	"In the End of Reincarnation"; Transliteration: "Rin'ne no Hate ni" (Japanese: 輪廻の果てに)	Nao Mitoshi & Kōsuke Murayama	Atsuo Ishino	Takanari Satō, Tōru Yoshida & Hiromitsu Kanazawa	June 26, 2026
The battle between Toya and Haito continues, with Toya gradually losing ground as he tires out. However, Haito suddenly stops attacking, wondering why Toya is risking his life like this, giving him his opportunity. He apologizes to Haito for breaking their promise, and asks for her assistance in carrying out his plan to destroy all Returners, pointing how they cannot just let the Forest of the Greats erase the futures of people like them who aspire to find their own talent. Haito comes back to her sense and agrees to help Toya. Satisfied that the duel has been resolved, Jubei encourages them to keep moving forward. Already mortally wounded, Jubei uses the last of her strength the cut the Moon in half in defiance before passing away. Toya and Haito then return to base, only to discover the battle against Albert had gone badly, with many of Kitazuka's men and almost all of the allied Returners having been killed except for Henri and Mesmer. Kitazuka and the survivors only managed to escape due to Nightingale awakening from her hibernation and forcibly recalling Albert, whose rogue action risked derailing her plan. She however does not show much concern that Toya is searching for the Seed, as it is protected by the Art Society who have eliminated every Great sent to find it. Meanwhile, Toya and Haito manage to narrow down the Seed's location to an island in the middle of the Atlantic Ocean, and together with Ein, Henri, Mesmer, and Kitazuka, depart on an expedition to find it.

== Reception ==
By August 2024, the series had over 3 million copies in circulation.
