= Wataru Murayama =

Japanese manga artist

Wataru Murayama (村山 渉; born on November 4) is a female Japanese manga writer. In the west she is mostly known for writing the manga Desert Coral.

== Profile ==
In the past she worked for Mag Garden's Monthly Comic Blade up until September 2006. Following that she became pregnant in September 2006, and the change in her condition caused Junkyard Magnetic's serialization to go on temporary hiatus. She delivered without complications in December 2006, and then finished Junkyard Magnetic.

== Manga list ==
- Desert Coral (Monthly Comic Blade, 5 volumes)
- Junkyard Magnetic (Monthly Comic Blade, 6 volumes)
- Hakaishin Ruruko (Monthly Comic Blade, 1 volume)
- Fukigen Cinderella (Dengeki Comic Japan, 1 volume)
- Hankyū Densha (Original novel by Hiro Arikawa, Wataru did the manga)
- Dysfunctional Family/Sonna Kazoku nara Sutechaeba (4 volumes, 1 in the works)
