= The Witch of Artemis =

Japanese manga series

- The cover of the first volume of The Witch of Artemis

星のウイッチ (Hoshi no Uitchi)
- Genre: Fantasy
- Manga
- Written by: Yui Hara
- Published by: Mag Garden
- English publisher: Tokyopop
- Magazine: Comic Blade
- Original run: January 30, 2006 – April 28, 2007
- Volumes: 3

The Witch of Artemis (Japanese: 星のウイッチ, Hepburn: Hoshi no Uitchi; lit. "Witch of the Star") is a Japanese manga series written by Yui Hara. The manga began serialization in Mag Garden's Comic Blade magazine in January 2006 and ended serialization in April 2007. Three tankōbon volumes of the manga were released between September 9, 2006, and July 10, 2007. The manga was licensed in North America by Tokyopop and the first volume was released on September 7, 2010.

== Reception ==
Reviewing the first volume, critics gave the manga lackluster reviews, comparing it to a standard fantasy story of a boy traveling to a different world, but found specific aspects to show potential. ComicBookBin called the story cute, saying that it is differentiated from other stories by the "interesting dynamic between Kazuki and Marie" and "Kazuki's unending optimism", but is otherwise average. Comics Worth Reading said that there was not much to say about the first volume since it is mostly setup, but called it "one of those books with lots of potential", adding that "[t]his volume is like cotton candy, a pleasant but substanceless treat." ICv2 said that points of interest in the manga were, "a surlier than usual heroine in Marie [and] a remarkably passive 'hero' in Kazuki", adding that the story concept was ubiquitous, but the manga is "done professionally enough this shouldn't bother the genre's many fans." Sequential Tart called the manga a "cute little story that will captivate readers younger than the recommended 13+", calling Kazuki an average character, but noting that Marie is a great character "hiding something dark", concluding that the manga was fun to read but does not offer anything unique to entice readers to read more. Manga Life called the manga "a little too... typical" in terms of the storyline and characters, but felt that there was potential in the series if the author went "a little deeper in the next volume".
