= Desert Coral =

Manga series by Wataru Murayama

デザート・コーラル
- Genre: Fantasy
- Manga
- Written by: Wataru Murayama
- Published by: Mag Garden
- English publisher: NA: ADV Manga
- Magazine: Monthly Comic Blade
- Original run: 2002 – 2004
- Volumes: 5
- icon

Desert Coral (デザート・コーラル) is a manga series by Wataru Murayama. Desert Coral has been published in six languages: Japanese, Thai, English, German, Spanish, and French. Currently, there are five volumes in Japanese, four volumes in Thai, three volumes in English, and five volumes in German, Spanish, and French. The fifth and final Japanese volume was released May 2004.

== Plot ==
The manga takes place on the fantasy world of Orgos. Naoto Saki is the main character. Naoto was summoned to Orgos by the sorceress Lusia during a battle with her rival, Camu. Naoto, who previously visited the world many times before through his dreams as an invisible entity, gains a body and becomes visible to everyone else in Orgos. Naoto is initially not a welcome visitor among the rest of Lusia's group (who call themselves "Desert Coral"), but their aloof and unfriendly attitude gradually changes over time. The group known as Desert Coral never clearly state what their intentions are, but they primarily seem to be together in order to destroy the Elphis, a sadistic semi-immortal race that lives in the 'superior levels' of Orgos. It is later revealed that Naoto had visited this world before when he was a child. These prior visits by Naoto were apparently a means to escape reality after the death of his little sister. The world of Orgos is also revealed to be a dream created by Naoto to escape reality. It is later discovered that Lotus, Lusia's older brother and in one way or another related to every member of Desert Coral, is trying to steal the world of Orgos from Naoto.

== Definitions ==
Lucavifate
A race (to which Lotus and Lusia belong) of people with a very short life span, rarely reaching twenty years of age. During the first ten years of their lives they are peaceful, obedient, and kept as pets by the Elphis. When they reach ten years of age, a dormant power awakens and their blood causes them to hate the Elphis. When their power awakens, they become a serious threat to the Elphis, so they are usually disposed of before that can occur. They are described as having a beautiful face, and silver hair with red strands (portrayed as pink in the manga).
Elphis
A race (to which Camu belongs) of semi-immortal beings who are sadistic, possess extreme magical potential, and control Orgos. They are one of the main antagonists of the story, with the exception of Camu, one of Desert Coral's members. In the manga, only four are seen. All of them have black hair and eyes.

== Characters ==
Naoto Saki (直人サキ)
An average high school student who had dreams about a world called Orgos. He is able to receive good grades in school despite the fact that he sleeps all the time in class. He was first summoned to Orgos by Lotus, but when Naoto went back to his world he lost his memories and power. This changes one day when Lusia used a spell to summon him back to Orgos during a fight with Camu. He gradually recovers his memory along with his power. In the world of Orgos Naoto is described as a "God". The Dimensional Dragon becomes attached to him when Naoto finds it buried beneath a dead dragon. The dragon said "It's interesting to see a human with the same ability I have." Epsilon describes him as an avatar of the Dimensional Dragon. He also described him as a "Monster" before Naoto lost his memories and power. He can create fire and then use it to make anything he thinks about become real.
Lusia
A girl with pink hair and pink eyes who summoned Naoto to Orgos. She is a Lucavifate. As stated by Camu she does not have long to live because she is draining her own life to keep Naoto in Orgos. She is the leader of Desert Coral. Lusia is the younger twin sister of Lotus. She was captured by the Elphis when she was little, then she was saved by Lotus. She has the power to control fire. She tells Naoto she loves him in volume 3. Her real name is Coral.
Lotus (蓮の花)
Lusia's older twin brother. When he was little he was raised by Camu. He wanted Camu to teach him how to summon so he could summon a god that would destroy the world. He accomplished that when he summoned Naoto. When Lusia was kidnapped by Elphis he went to their lair and traded places with Lusia with the help of Levinas, because Lusia was going to be killed. He is killed by Levinas after becoming poisoned by hate.
Epsilon (イプシロン)

An expert swordsman. He used to be a lone traveler who walked around Orgos killing whenever he felt like it. His behavior becomes calmer after he meets Lotus. Epsilon, Lotus, and Luna form the first Desert Coral (although not actually naming it as such at that point). He keeps his loyalty first to Lotus, and then to Lusia after Lotus is killed.

Levinas (レヴィナス)
A man who is also part cat. He has some experience in sword fighting, but not much. During the story he acts mostly as a mother figure to Desert Coral, and does most of the chores. He always stays by Lusia's side, having taken care of her from when he was a slave of Sildis. Lusia now regards Levinas as her pet.
Camu
An Elphis who lives in the lower levels of Orgos. She is shown to be a skilled sorceress, although at times she puts people in danger by being careless. She took care of Lotus when he was small. She is shown to love both Lotus and Lusia. Because of this, she resists showing them how to summon since this would shorten their lives.
Euro (ユーロ)
The youngest of the group. He Joined Desert Coral when he was saved by Lusia. He does not fight often during the course of the history, but does play an important role in keeping the group together. Although he acts like a male, probably due to his brother always treating him as such, he is shown near the end of the manga to be a girl.
Chisato (千里)
Naoto's childhood friend. She takes care of him most of the time.
Dimensional Dragon (次元龍)
A dragon who can cross between Orgos and Naoto's world. It has a special connection to Naoto and shows interest in him when the dragon first meets him. The Dimensional Dragon helped Lusia find the water spirit in volume 3. Near the end of the manga it is discovered that it was initially a cat who Chisato, Naoto, and Sa-chan took care of.

=== Minor characters ===
Sa-chan
Naoto's younger sister. She drowned in a river when Naoto was unable to help her.
Luna
A companion of Lotus and Epsilon when they first travelled. She is known to be in love with Epsilon. She is assassinated by Lotus for unknown reasons.
Alt
A member of the old Desert Coral, he accidentally kills Rekia and is then assassinated by Lotus. He is Euro's older brother.
Kahla
A member of the old Desert Coral and a powerful sorceress. She commits suicide after witnessing Lotus encouraging an old woman to suicide.
Rekia
A member of the old Desert Coral and cook. She believed blindly in everything Lotus said and is killed by Alt while protecting Naoto.
Sladis
An Elphis interested in Naoto's power. He is a sort of "mastermind" for the Elphis.
