= Tengai Retrogical =

Japanese manga series

天外レトロジカル (Tengai Retorojikaru)
- Genre: Fantasy
- Manga
- Written by: Rin Asano
- Published by: Mag Garden
- English publisher: NA: ADV Manga
- Magazine: Monthly Comic Blade
- Original run: 2002 – 2006
- Volumes: 7

Tengai Retrogical (Japanese: 天外レトロジカル, Hepburn: Tengai Retorojikaru) is a Japanese manga series written and illustrated by Rin Asano. It was serialized in Mag Garden's Monthly Comic Blade magazine from 2002 to 2006 and published in seven volumes.

== Publication ==
Written and illustrated by Rin Asano, the series began serialization in Mag Garden's Monthly Comic Blade magazine in 2002. It completed its serialization in Monthly Comic Blade in 2006. Its individual chapters were collected into seven tankōbon volumes.

In March 2004, ADV Manga announced that they licensed the series for English publication.

=== Volumes ===
No.	Original release date	Original ISBN	English release date	English ISBN
1	November 9, 2002	978-4-90-192617-1	December 14, 2004	978-1-41-390208-2
2	March 10, 2003	978-4-90-192649-2	—	—
3	January 10, 2004	978-4-86-127007-9	—	—
4	November 10, 2004	978-4-86-127089-5	—	—
5	December 10, 2005	978-4-86-127221-9	—	—
6	September 9, 2006	978-4-86-127309-4	—	—
7	March 10, 2007	978-4-86-127382-7	—	—

== Reception ==
Mike Dungan of Mania described the manga as "a very enjoyable story that is equal parts action, horror, fantasy, science fiction, historical drama, and comedy." He commended the manga's characterization, stating there was an "air of confidence in both the art and the storytelling". In Manga: The Complete Guide, Jason Thompson praised the artwork, though he felt the plot was too vague and withheld too much information from the reader. Liann Cooper of Anime News Network described the characters as "generic" and the environments as "bland". He concluded by describing the manga as "so unimpressive that just ends up being incredibly boring".

== See also ==
- Deaimon, another manga series by the same author
