= The First King Adventure =

Japanese manga series

賢者の長き不在 -THE FIRSTKING ADVENTURE- (Kenja no Nagaki Fuzai: Za Fāsuto Kingu Adobenchā)
- Genre: Fantasy
- Manga
- Written by: Moyamu Fujino
- Published by: Mag Garden
- English publisher: NA: ADV Manga
- Magazine: Monthly Comic Blade
- Original run: 2002 – 2005
- Volumes: 8

The First King Adventure (Japanese: 賢者の長き不在 -THE FIRSTKING ADVENTURE-, Hepburn: Kenja no Nagaki Fuzai: Za Fāsuto Kingu Adobenchā) is a Japanese manga series written and illustrated by Moyamu Fujino. It was serialized in Mag Garden's Monthly Comic Blade magazine from 2002 to 2005, with its individual chapters collected into eight volumes. The story follows the trials of Prince Varumu in his journey to create pacts with various spirit masters.

== Publication ==
Written and illustrated by Moyamu Fujino, the series began serialization in the April 2002 issue of Mag Garden's Monthly Comic Blade magazine. Its serialization was completed in the June 2005 issue. The series' individual chapters were collected into eight tankōbon volumes.

ADV Manga published the first two volumes in English.

== Reception ==
Eduardo Chavez of Mania liked the characters, though he "finds it hard to dig through all of the mediocrity [in the manga]". Malindy Hetfeld of Splash Comics praised the illustrations, which they felt were similar to the works of Yukiru Sugisaki. In Manga: The Complete Guide, Jason Thompson praised the illustrations and story, the latter of which he described as "surprisingly wistful".
