= M3: The Dark Metal =

Japanese anime television series

- Japanese Blu-Ray cover (V1) of M3: The Dark Metal

M3〜ソノ黒キ鋼〜 (Emu Surī: Sono Kuroki Hagane)
- Anime television series
- Directed by: Junichi Sato
- Written by: Mari Okada
- Music by: Hajime Sakita
- Studio: Satelight, C2C
- Original network: Tokyo MX, KBS, Sun TV, TV Aichi, TVh, TVQ, AT-X
- Original run: April 21, 2014 – October 1, 2014
- Episodes: 24
- Manga
- Written by: Kazuomi Minatogawa
- Published by: Mag Garden
- Magazine: Monthly Comic Blade
- Original run: April 30, 2014 – September 10, 2015
- Volumes: 2
- icon

M3: The Dark Metal (M3〜ソノ黒キ鋼〜, Emu Surī: Sono Kuroki Hagane; lit. 'M3: That Black Steel') is a Japanese anime television series produced by Satelight. It aired from April 21, 2014, to October 1, 2014. It is directed by Junichi Sato, written by Mari Okada and has mecha designs by Shōji Kawamori.

A manga adaptation with art by Kazuomi Minatogawa was serialized in Mag Garden's shōnen manga magazine Monthly Comic Blade from April 30, 2014, to September 10, 2015.

== Plot ==
The story focuses on a group of 4 boys and 4 girls (later on 5) who met, when they were younger, in a realm full of darkness. A mysterious substance called Necrometal devours or infects anything that comes within a certain distance of a place called the Lightless Realm. To counteract this threat, large combat robots called the Vess are produced. It starts at an ordinary school in a city of close proximity to the Lightless Realm and focuses on Akashi for the most part.

Akashi is number 1 in the school when using training versions of Vess to defeat schoolmates and is first seen fighting his best friend and defeating him. A man approaches him with an invitation to join a special force that is tasked with defeating the Corpses and uncovering the secrets of the Lightless Realm. Fast forward some time and a Corpse appears which has the power to "kill" people who hear its song. It sings a lovely melody and like a countdown, over the next few months it is discovered that Emiru has become infected by the Necrometal that has plagued the Lightless Realm for so long. It is now up to Akashi to use the device known as the Reaper or MA-Vess in order to defeat the Corpse and save everyone.

== Characters ==
=== Team Gargouille ===
Akashi Saginuma (鷺沼 アカシ, Saginuma Akashi)
Voiced by: Yoshitsugu Matsuoka, Marina Inoue (child)
A 2nd-year high-schooler from Kukonochi Academy, Akashi is a thin young male who is popular with the ladies. He has dark hair and eyes, but fair skin. Not much is understood about his family, but it is shown that his father had died during a former investigation of the Lightless Realm. In a flashback of the funeral, Akashi says to himself that he wished his brother had died instead. He is the pilot of the Argent and his brother's remains and soul were used in the creation of the Argent's LIM system. When he had joined the Special Investigation Team, the only person he showed real interest in was Sasame Izuriha because she resembles a girl from his childhood. Emiru Hazaki was constantly trying to attract his attention so that she would finally be important but due to circumstance's she becomes the second LIM. Akashi pilots the LIM containing Sasame during his final confrontation with Minashi and disagreed with his solution of uniting all of humanity with Necrometal, claiming humans can connect and understand each other without being one. When he visits Sasame at a hospital, he starts crying and shortly after that Sasame awakens.
Emiru Hazaki (破先 エミル, Hazaki Emiru)
Voiced by: Yoko Hikasa
Emiru Hazaki, a tall girl with long blonde hair in the style of two long ponytails that reach to her thighs, brown eyes and fair pale skin. Emiru had lost her parents in the Lightless Realm when she was little, and so she was adopted by her relatives. However, they only had the incentive of receiving the 'Disaster Security Type-One and Special Disaster Special Payment' (some form of life insurance). Because her guardians had no real love for her, she ended up neglected and bullied in school. Straight out of Junior High, she was forced to work and earn her own living. She is first seen in the show as a janitor in Akashi's school, watching his match. Out of the blue one day, a man offers her a position to join the Special Investigation Team Training Program. From the beginning of the program, she tries to seduce Akashi by planning her every move with him. Akashi, however, does not see her in the same light, and shuts her down every time she gives him an opportunity to bond with her. One night, she tricks him into meeting with her and tries to tell him her dark secret. That she was infected and bound to be an Admonition. However, she never manages to, and slowly sinks into despair. Her state only worsens as she finds out that she is synchronized with the psychotic killer, Heito Isaku. After hearing the Corpses song, she dies a tragic death traumatizing Heito, and the others. She mentioned to Akashi that she wants him to defeat the Corpse. First one to be affected by the Corpse song. Her remains and soul are used in the creation of the Sable's LIM system. She is the second person to become a LIM after Akashi's brother. After the Lightless Realm ends, she is slowly being restored to her normal self, with Mahmu as her partner in restoring her memories.
Sasame Izuriha (出羽 ササメ, Izuriha Sasame)
Voiced by: Kotori Koiwai
A young girl with short, silver hair and large brown eyes with pale looking skin. She was originally a priestess from Yomijima, together with Minashi and Tsugumi. They came to Tokyo to seek revenge on IX, the organisation that destroyed their hometown. She later met up with the other children and developed feelings for Akashi. However in the present time, she seemed to have lost memories of her childhood as she joined Team Gargouille under IX. She is the second person to be affected by the Corpse song and the third person to become a LIM. After the Corpse is purified, she is seen slowly regaining her normal form, and she finally woke up when Akashi started to cry.
Iwato Namito (波戸 イワト, Namito Iwato)
Voiced by: Tomoaki Maeno, Rina Satō (child)
Akashi's friend who is also a 2nd-year from Kukonochi Academy. He is tall, has brown hair and eyes and wears a red headband. He is paired with Raika, and develops feelings towards her later on.
Raika Kasumi (霞 ライカ, Kasumi Raika)
Voiced by: Sayuri Yahagi
A Vess test pilot. She has black hair and brown eyes. She is usually paired with Iwato and develops feelings towards him later on. She was a test pilot for IX but she now has to go through training again as she was selected as part of the elite team investigating the Lightless Realm.
Minashi Maki (真木 ミナシ, Maki Minashi)
Voiced by: Tetsuya Kakihara, Minami Tsuda (child)
The most cheerful and easy going member of Team Gargouille. He has brown hair and dark brown eyes. He is paired with Sasame and the one who understands her the most, as it turns out both came from the same hometown, Yomijima. He later becomes the pilot of the MA-Vess whose LIM contains Sasame. He is the only one in Team Gargouille who remembers the past and the sin of leaving behind Tsugumi in the Lightless Realm. He is also a Linker, being able to understand people's feelings and thoughts without speech. Minashi believed that all of humanity should have been turned into Necrometal by the Corpse and voluntarily allowed himself to be infected, but after fighting Akashi, he's nearly swallowed by the miasma of darkness, until he's saved by the rest of Team Gargouille. He survives with slight injuries, and Tsugumi is seen siting next to his hospital bed.
Maamu Yuzuki (弓月 マアム, Yuzuki Maamu)
Voiced by: Misato Fukuen
A 1st-year high-schooler from Kukonochi Academy. Has black hair tied into two low tails and big black eyes. Although soft spoken and shy, she tends to express her dark emotions in a notebook. Because of her lonely attitude, she is not paired with anyone. She also becomes Sable's second pilot replacing Heito. It takes her a while to accept Emiru as her LIM. While searching on her old writings, she finds her connection with Emiru; when they were kids she noticed her loneliness and her desire of being noticed, so she wrote in her notebook a note that expressed her understanding of their feelings that were similar. After that epiphany the MA-Vess fully accepts her.
Heito Isaku (伊削 ヘイト, Isaku Heito)
Voiced by: Ayumu Murase, Risa Taneda (child)
A tall young man who has ear piercings and a lower lip piercing. He has short, white hair and brown eyes. He killed his family when he was younger due to being stuck in the Lightless Realm. He was devoured by the Necrometal in his time there which caused him to go crazy. He is a psychopath hellbent on making everyone feel fear to make himself feel better. He is closely linked to Emiru and constantly wants to kill Akashi because he knows that she likes Akashi and not him. He addresses Emiru as his "terror" and she constantly stops him from killing Akashi multiple times when riding in the MA-Vess Sable. He went missing in the Lightless Realm but was able to survive, having only 40% of his body turning into Necrometal. At the end of the series, he is also slowly being restored to normal, with his old teddy bear as partner to restore his memories.

=== Other characters ===
Aoshi Saginuma (鷺沼 アオシ, Saginuma Aoshi)
Voiced by: Nobuyuki Hiyama
The older brother of Akashi. He is one of the first people to use a MA-Vess before the LIM system was created. He was turned into Necrometal and asked to become the first LIM. He is Akashi's LIM, although Akashi wanted him dead. Later on Akashi sees his brother's memories and comes to the realization that he was in pain all this time. In a flashback through Aoshi's memories we can see him and Kasane as lovers.
Thanks to the great synchronization between him and Akashi, he became capable of speaking through the Argent, much to the disbelief of team Gargouille, while protecting Kasane from a Corpse. The stress of the fight becomes too much for his LIM and dies after defeating the Corpse, while saying goodbye to Kasane.
Kasane Agura (阿倉 カサネ, Agura Kasane)
Voiced by: Ai Maeda
A scientist at the academy who used to be Aoshi's lover. It was revealed later on that she was the one who asked for Akashi to be on team Gargouille, but now regrets it. She seems to see Akashi as a replacement for Aoshi, but he can see right through her and gets angry with her.
Sadami Natsuiri (夏入)
Voiced by: Nobuo Tobita
A very eccentric scientist from IX in charge of the creation of the MA-Vess and the LIM system. He is very interested in finding out the truth about the Lightless Realm and doesn't hesitate about suggesting one of the pilots should become a LIM once their bodies become Necrometal. It is revealed that he once worked with Mimei, Minashi's older sister. His desire of pursuing more Linkers in his experiments to link people's thoughts led him to Yomijima. He made use of the inhabitants as test subjects and drove them to suicide. Mimei realized this and tried to leave, but ends up being captured by Natsuiri and became the first subject of his LIM project. He is attacked by a massive Corpse and uses his prototype MA-Vess to defeat it, until he realizes he's been infected with Necrometal. While at first excited, when he tries to communicate with Mimei, he realizes that she is long gone. He's then ripped to pieces by the Necrometal, while screaming for Mimei and that they should all be worshipping him.
Susan Suzaki (須崎)
Voiced by: Marina Inoue
A government military officer assigned to supervise the Team Gargouille. She used to be schoolmates with Kasane and dislikes being called by her first name. She assumes control over Team Gargouille's missions after the death of Natsuiri.
Tsugumi Izuriha (ツグミ)
Voiced by: Kotori Koiwai
Sasame's older sister with the same appearance as Sasame except with longer hair. She was also a priestess from Yomijima, but unlike the other children, she was left behind in the Lightless Realm. This caused her to bear hatred to the other children and she also vows to continue her revenge on IX. She usually appears with the Corpse, wearing a white sleeveless dress. She has been living in the Lightless Realm ever since by surviving on the Arbornine. She also saves Akashi in episode 15, preventing him from turning into Necrometal as she still harbors feelings for him since childhood. After realizing that the Corpse is crying for the sins, she deeply regrets pushing it so far and prays for Akashi's triumph over Minashi. She's later seen with the now harmless and purified Corpse, as well as visiting Minashi.
Mimei Maki (真木 ミメイ, Maki Mimei)
Voiced by: Rina Satō
Minashi's older sister who was a Linker. She used to work along with Natsuiri in the hopes of allowing people to understand one another without speech. However, due to Natsuiri's obsession in his experiments, she became the first subject in the LIM project.

== Episodes ==
No.	Title	Original release date
1	"Starry Night"; Transliteration: "Fu Hoshi no Yoru" (Japanese: 降星ノ夜)	April 21, 2014
2	"Embraced by the Reaper"; Transliteration: "Shinigami ni Ho Kare" (Japanese: 死神ニ抱カレ)	April 28, 2014
3	"Seam of the Past"; Transliteration: "Kako no Denbi" (Japanese: 過去ノ綻ビ)	May 6, 2014
4	"Danger, Do Not Mix"; Transliteration: "Kon Zeruna Kiken" (Japanese: 混ゼルナ危険)	May 12, 2014
5	"Self In Vain"; Transliteration: "Onore Kyo Shiku" (Japanese: 己虚シク)	May 19, 2014
6	"Terror Fading Into Death"; Transliteration: "Kie Shi Ku Kyōfu" (Japanese: キエ逝ク恐怖)	May 27, 2014
7	"Command of Solitude"; Transliteration: "Kodoku no Saihai" (Japanese: 孤独ノ采配)	June 2, 2014
8	"Reckless Forbidden Realm"; Transliteration: "Mubō Kin-Iki" (Japanese: 無謀禁域)	June 9, 2014
9	"Blue Heart of Steel"; Transliteration: "Aoi Ki-Kō Kokoro" (Japanese: 蒼キ鋼心)	June 16, 2014
10	"Your Song"; Transliteration: "Kimi no Uta" (Japanese: 君ノ歌)	June 24, 2014
11	"Red Lament of Cruelty"; Transliteration: "Akai no Dōkoku" (Japanese: 赤ノ慟刻)	July 1, 2014
12	"What Links Two People"; Transliteration: "Futari o Tsunagi Gumono" (Japanese: 二人ヲ繋グモノ)	July 11, 2014
13	"Roar of the Beast"; Transliteration: "Kemono no Hōkō" (Japanese: 獣ノ咆哮)	July 16, 2014
14	"Sounds of Regret"; Transliteration: "Shitau hi Zan Shino Oto" (Japanese: 思ヒ残シノオト)	July 23, 2014
15	"Vacant Heart of Morning Gray"; Transliteration: "Mimei no Ketsu Kokoro" (Japanese: 未明ノ欠心)	July 30, 2014
16	"Promised Together"; Transliteration: "Issho no Yakusoku" (Japanese: 一緒ノ約束)	August 6, 2014
17	"Light of the Lightless"; Transliteration: "Mumyō no Hikari" (Japanese: 無明ノ光)	August 13, 2014
18	"The Truth of Yomijima"; Transliteration: "Yomijima no Shinjitsu" (Japanese: 読島ノ真実)	August 20, 2014
19	"The Black Sunset"; Transliteration: "Kuroki Irihi" (Japanese: 黒キ入日)	August 26, 2014
20	"Overlapping Sound of Love"; Transliteration: "Ai no Jūon" (Japanese: 愛ノ重音)	September 3, 2014
21	"You Will, to the Birth Cry of the End"; Transliteration: "Shūen no Ubugoe Ni-kun wa" (Japanese: 終焉ノ産声ニ君ハ)	September 10, 2014
22	"Light, and then Light"; Transliteration: "Hikari, Soshite Hikari" (Japanese: 光、ソシテ光)	September 17, 2014
23	"Proof of the Strongest"; Transliteration: "Saikyō no Akashi" (Japanese: 最強ノ証)	September 24, 2014
24	"Original Sin, Past and Future"; Transliteration: "Genzai, Kakomirai" (Japanese: 原罪、カコミライ)	October 1, 2014

== Development ==
=== Music ===
The first opening theme is "Re:REMEMBER" by May'n while the second opening theme is "Replica" by Maaya Sakamoto. The first ending theme is "ego-izm" by La La Larks. The second ending theme is "Sable" by nano.

== Release ==
The series was acquired by Daisuki for online simulcast streaming with English, Traditional Chinese and Spanish subtitles worldwide except in Japan and China.
