= Chichi Kogusa =

Japanese manga series

- First tankōbon volume cover

ちちこぐさ
- Genre: Slice of life
- Manga
- Written by: Mi Tagawa
- Published by: Mag Garden
- Magazine: Monthly Comic Blade (January 2013–July 2014); Monthly Comic Garden (September 2014–March 2018)
- Original run: January 15, 2013 – March 5, 2018
- Volumes: 8

Chichi Kogusa (ちちこぐさ; lit. "Father & Child Grass") is a Japanese manga series written and illustrated by Mi Tagawa. It was serialized in Mag Garden's Shōnen manga magazine Monthly Comic Blade from January 2013 to July 2014, and continued serialization on Mag Garden's Monthly Comic Garden magazine from September 2014 to March 2018, with its chapters collected in eight tankōbon volumes as of July 2018.

== Premise ==
Torakichi, a traveling herbalist, spends most of his time on the road visiting his clients. As a result, he almost never saw his three-year-old son, Shiro... when his wife died, he made a decision that would change his life: to take the little boy with him on the roads, But if Torakichi is knowledgeable about medicinal plants, he knows nothing about children and is far from being a model father... why is Shiro crying? why does he wake up in the middle of the night? Between daily worries and his grueling work, the young father is completely overwhelmed. will the hazards of the trip and the various encounters help him to reconnect the lost bond with his son?

== Publication ==
Chichi Kogusa, written and illustrated by Mi Tagawa, started in Mag Garden's Shōnen manga magazine Monthly Comic Blade on January 15, 2013. When the Comic Blade magazine ceased print publication on 30 July 2014, the series was moved to Mag Garden's new Monthly Comic Garden magazine starting on 1 September 2014, while also continuing publication on Comic Blade's website. the manga finished serialization in the magazine on March 5, 2018. Mag Garden collected its chapters in eight tankōbon volumes, released from July 10, 2013, to July 10, 2018.

In France, the manga is licensed by Ki-oon; and in Spain by Milky Way Ediciones.

=== Volumes ===
No.	Release date	ISBN
1	July 10, 2013	978-4-80000-184-9
2	April 10, 2014	978-4-80000-271-6
3	January 10, 2015	978-4-80000-398-0
4	September 10, 2015	978-4-80000-496-3
5	April 9, 2016	978-4-80000-496-3
6	November 10, 2016	978-4-80000-629-5
7	June 9, 2017	978-4-80000-697-4
8	July 10, 2018	978-4-80000-789-6

== Reception ==
Chichi Kogusa wins the 2016 Shônen Tournament.
