= Mamotte Shugogetten =

Manga by Minene Sakurano and its adaptations

- Mamotte Shugogetten!
- Promotional image

まもって守護月天!
- Manga

Guardian Angel Getten
- Written by: Minene Sakurano
- Published by: Enix (1st edition); Mag Garden (2nd edition)
- English publisher: US: Gutsoon! Entertainment; Tokyopop
- Magazine: Monthly Shōnen Gangan
- English magazine: NA: Raijin Comics
- Original run: April 1996 – February 2000
- Volumes: 11 (Enix edition); 10 (Mag Garden edition)
- Anime television series

Moon Guardian
- Directed by: Yukio Kaizawa
- Produced by: Atsushi Kaji (TV Asahi); Tetsuya Watanabe (Dentsu); Nobutaka Nishizawa
- Written by: Yoshimichi Hosoi
- Music by: Joe Rinoie
- Studio: Toei Animation
- Original network: ANN (TV Asahi)
- Original run: October 17, 1998 – April 3, 1999
- Episodes: 22
- Original video animation

Moon Guardian: Denshin
- Directed by: Yukio Kaizawa (#1, 4, 5, 8); Harume Kosaka (#2–3); Hiroki Shibata (#6); Hidehiko Kadota (#7)
- Produced by: Hiroyuki Sakurada; Mitsuteru Shibata
- Written by: Nobuyuki Fujimoto (#1–5); Ayuna Fujisaki (#6–7); Minene Sakurano (#8)
- Music by: Hiroyuki Kōzu; Takeshi Yukawa (#5–8)
- Studio: Toei Animation
- Released: June 23, 2000 – November 30, 2001
- Runtime: 30 minutes
- Episodes: 8
- Manga

Mamotte Shugogetten Retrouvailles
- Written by: Minene Sakurano
- Published by: Mag Garden
- Magazine: Monthly Comic Blade
- Original run: March 2002 – March 2005
- Volumes: 6
- Manga

Kaifū no Shō
- Written by: Minene Sakurano
- Published by: Mag Garden
- Magazine: Mag Comi
- Original run: December 25, 2015 – present
- Volumes: 12

Mamotte Shugogetten (まもって守護月天!) is a Japanese manga series written and illustrated by Minene Sakurano, which was serialized in the monthly magazine Shōnen GanGan from 1996 to 2000. A continuation was published in Comic Blade titled Mamotte Shugogetten! Retrouvailles (まもって守護月天! 再逢, Mamotte Shugogetten! Retoruba) from 2002 to 2005. The manga was adapted into a 22-episode anime television series produced by Toei Animation titled in English as Moon Guardian and often simply titled as Shugogetten! (守護月天!) which aired from 1998 to 1999. An eight-episode OVA series, Denshin Mamotte Shugogetten (伝心まもって守護月天!), was released from 2000 to 2001.

The story involves Tasuke Shichiri, a 14-year-old boy who receives a gift from his father, Tarousuke, who is traveling in China. The gift is a ring, the shitenrin, and those pure of heart may gaze into it and receive a moon goddess named Shaolin.

An English adaptation of the first manga was serialized in Raijin Comics under the English title Guardian Angel Getten. TOKYOPOP later licensed the manga under its original title, which began publication in April 2008. But Mamotte Shugogetten Retrouvailles has yet to be released in English.

A sequel, subtitled Kaifū no Shō, began serialization on Mag Garden's Mag Comi manga website in December 2015.

== Characters ==
Shaorin (守護月天 小璘, Shugogetten Shaorin; Chinese Pinyin: Xiǎolín, Gutsoon spelling: Shao Lin)

A moon spirit who wears traditional-style costumes, she has little understanding of the human world after spending a few thousand years in the confines of the shitenrin. Throughout the anime, her purpose is to protect Tasuke, and she does so by summoning different assistants called Hoshigami (星神, literally "star gods") through the ring. She initially causes trouble for Tasuke by destroying harmless household objects in her efforts to protect him. She is banned from going to the school after destroying some of it. Because of this, Shaorin sends Rishu to protect Tasuke at school. In the manga, her misguided efforts to protect him on the first day cause Tasuke to order her to go away, saying that he can protect himself. A bit later, she apologizes and asks his permission to protect him from loneliness. On that basis, the manga continues. She develops feelings for Tasuke and gets jealous when Kaori shows up in anime episode 12 and in the last 2 episodes, she finally realizes what she feels for Tasuke. In the manga, as a spirit, she profoundly does not understand these feelings. Her guardian, the hoshigami Nankyuko-Jusei, counsels her that these are feelings that she should not learn. He means that it will make eternity harder for her when she must part from Tasuke. Her given name might be Rin, with "Shao-" being an affectionate suffix. Vol 5 of the manga shows that people casually familiar with her think that she's an ordinary person and her family name (last name) is "Shugogetten". She is voiced by Mariko Kouda.

Tasuke Shichiri (七梨太助, Shichiri Tasuke)

The main character. He is a high school (middle school in the manga) student, son of a globe-trotting archeologist father. Because his father and older sister travel and his mother left for a global trip when he was just a baby. He lives alone in his two-story home at the beginning of the story. He is decisive and intelligent, but beleaguered, and is a similar character to Keiichi Morisato in both personality and situation. He has a crush on Shaorin just after he first meets her, and his feelings for her develop even more throughout the series. Tasuke wishes to save Shao, though he is very uncertain how to save her or from what to save her. He is voiced by Daisuke Sakaguchi.

Keikounitten Ruuan (慶幸日天 汝昴, Keikōnitten Rūan)

Freed by Tasuke from a wand artifact, the kokutentou was found in the same area as the shitenrin and sent to Tasuke by his father. Ruuan's role as opposed to Shaorin's is not to protect Tasuke, but instead to make him happy, which she does by giving inanimate objects life to do her bidding. In the manga, she gets herself a job as Tasuke's homeroom teacher. Ruuan and Shao are sworn rivals and conflict often occurs as their roles of keeping Tasuke "safe" or "happy" aren't always equivalent. She falls in love with Tasuke, however, she takes a stronger approach, often trying to have sex with him. Rūa is voiced by Yumi Takada.

Rishu (離珠)

The tiny, pink-haired, telepathic hoshigami of Shaorin is given to Tasuke when he attends school. She also takes most responsibility for keeping the house clean and is called the "garbage gnome" by Ruuan. She is unable to speak at an audible volume to Tasuke so she communicates by drawing cartoons on palm cards with a paintbrush. Furthermore, she has a cute way of speaking, which includes saying "deshi" instead of "desu" and calling Tasuke "Tasuke-shama".

Bannanchiten Kiryū (万難地天 紀柳)

Freed from a small Chinese fan, also sent by Tasuke's father. She is an earth spirit, and her role is to put her master through trials by making things grow to several times their normal size. In the manga, she is first seen in chapter 39. In the animation, she only appears in the Denshin Mamotte Shugogetten OVA. Her stock phrase is, "It is a challenge. <Verb> it." When asked to tell a bit more about herself, she replied "It is a challenge. Look it up." (Shao answered and explained it to Tasuke). Kiryu is voiced by Houko Kuwashima (OVA).

Izumo Miyauchi (宮内 出雲, Miyauchi Izumo)

A man from the local Shinto shrine who is in love with Shaorin. In the manga, he also runs the school store, which provides more opportunities to see Shaorin and participate in stories. He is aware of Shaorin's nature. He has the cool, cheerful look whenever he is near cute girls, but has an evil look towards the boys, making the guys suggest he has a split personality. Furthermore, he is also not above using underhanded tactics to try to get Shaorin. Once he realized she was in love with Tasuke, he tried to manipulate her lack of understanding of these feelings into the belief that it was guilt. Overall, he proposed that she should leave him as she sees herself as a burden to Tasuke. He is voiced by Toshiyuki Morikawa.

Kouichirou Endou (遠藤 乎一郎, Endō Kōichirō) and Takashi Nomura (野村 たかし, Nomura Takashi)

Tasuke's classmates. Kouichirou is in love with Ruuan and Takashi is in love with Shaorin. They are aware of Shaorin's nature. Kouichiro is voiced by Omi Minami and Takashi is voiced by Ryōtarō Okiayu.

Kaori Aihara (愛原 花織, Aihara Kaori)

A student at Tasuke's school. She is one year behind Tasuke at the school that they attend. She is jealous of Shaorin and Ruuan and feels they are rivals to win Tasuke's heart. Furthermore, she first meets Tasuke in the anime after she wishes to Kami (God) that she will meet the man of her dreams, and she falls immediately in love with Tasuke when he saves her from tripping over. In the manga early in her first term at the school, on a rainy day, Tasuke sees that she doesn't have an umbrella and lends her his. He forgets for the moment that Shaorin and Ruuan aren't at the school that day. He can't replace his umbrella. She develops a big crush on Tasuke, and it keeps getting enlarged by inadvertent accidents. She is voiced by Eriko Hara.

Shouko Yamanobe (山野辺 翔子, Yamanobe Shōko)

She starts as a delinquent girl, but after befriending Shaorin, Shouko decides to try to bring her and Tasuke together. Her personality softens after she meets Shaorin, and it is seen that she becomes sensitive when it comes to understanding Tasuke and Shaorin's relationship. She is aware of Shaorin's nature. She has an odd habit of being able to appear anywhere, as well as enjoys playing "matchmaker" solely because of all the entertainment she gets from the situation. Shouko is voiced by Nami Miyahara.

Nana Shichiri (七梨 那奈, Shichiri Nana)

Tasuke's older sister, a world traveler. In chapter 16 she comes home. Tasuke tries to conceal all the spirits from his sister, while Ruuan tries to reveal Shao, in hopes that the older sister will kick Shao out of the house. Nana is favorably impressed by Shao. When she leaves again in chapter 17 she asks Shao to stay with and look after Tasuke. In chapter 51 she comes home again, bringing with her another woman named Sayuri, whom she had found on a sickbed in Mongolia. Nana thinks, correctly, that Sayuri is their mother. Sayuri leaves in chapter 52, but Nana stays. She is irked with Tasuke because he hadn't told her that Shao isn't human. She then fills much of the pot-stirrer role that Ruuan has filled until now. Factoid: Nana and Izumo had attended the same middle school.

Tarousuke Shichiri (七梨 太郎助, Shichiri Tarōsuke)

The father of Tasuke and Nana.

Sayuri Shichiri (七梨 さゆり, Shichiri Sayuri)

The mother of Tasuke and Nana.

== Music ==
Anime television series

Opening Themes
#	Transcription/Translation	Performed by	Episodes
	Saa!	Surface	All

Ending themes
#	Transcription/Translation	Performed by	Episodes
1	Soba ni iru dake de "I Just Feel so Love Again"	Sweet Velvet	All
2	Makenaide	Mariko Kouda	22 (Episode 22 has two endings)

OVA

Opening Themes
#	Transcription/Translation	Performed by	Episodes
1	Wish	Mariko Kouda	1-5
2	Magic	Mariko Kouda	6-8

Ending themes
#	Transcription/Translation	Performed by	Episodes
1	I'll Follow You	jyushi-ca	1-5
2	Hoshigami Rishu-deshi (星神 離珠でし)	Ayako Kawasumi	6-8
