= Neko Rahmen =

Japanese comic strip manga by Kenji Sonishi

- Cover of Neko Rahmen Vol.1

猫ラーメン (Neko Rāmen)
- Genre: Comedy
- Manga
- Written by: Kenji Sonishi
- Published by: Mag Garden
- English publisher: NA: Tokyopop
- Magazine: Comic Blade Masamune; Monthly Comic Blade
- Original run: 2006 – 2012
- Volumes: 5
- Anime television series
- Studio: Think Corporation
- Licensed by: AUS NA / UK: Vuze
- Original run: 24 December 2006 – August 2007
- Episodes: 13
- Anime

Neko Rahmen: Ore no Shouyu Aji
- Studio: Think Corporation
- Licensed by: AUS NA / UK: Vuze
- Released: 2008 – 2008
- Manga

Neko Ramen Monogatari - Koneko no Thomas
- Written by: Kenji Sonishi
- Published by: Mag Garden
- Magazine: Eden
- Published: 2011

Neko Rahmen (Japanese: 猫ラーメン, Hepburn: Neko Rāmen; lit. '"Cat Ramen"'), also known as Neko Ramen, is a Japanese four-panel comic strip manga created by Kenji Sonishi. The comedy centers around a cat (Taishō) and his encounters while running a ramen shop.

The yonkoma series has been adapted into a TV flash anime produced by Think Corporation, with 26 episodes to date. The original yonkoma is still being published in the monthly Japanese manga magazine Monthly Comic Blade. Neko Rahmen was the most watched short animation series on Yahoo! Japan in August 2007.

The series is also noted for being the first anime series to be licensed exclusively by a US IPTV company, Vuze, and made available as a free download without digital restrictions. Vuze also subtitled the first 13-episode season of the series into English. There was a live-action adaptation by Tornado Film titled "Neko Ramen Taishō," that utilizes both real cats and plush puppets.

== Principal characters ==
Taishō
Voiced by Rie Nakagawa
Taishō (大将, "boss" or "chief") is the entrepreneurial ramen chef and sole proprietor of Neko Rahmen, the only restaurant in Tokyo run by a cat. His primary goal is to make money and expand his ramen business, with a secondary plan of customer satisfaction, or at least entertainment. He was a former kitten model, who ran away from home and had a hard life on the streets before being saved by kind ramen shop owner who later served as Taishō's mentor. He takes pride in his noodles and is easily angered when customers are dissatisfied. Taisho also has a medical license and a driver's license. He and his family seem to be the only cats in the series who actually can talk. Taisho's real name is William Thomas Jefferson III, and he is a pure breed American Shorthair (though he dislikes both about himself). Taisho also owns and runs Neko Curry, a curry shop.
Kōichi Tanaka
Voiced by Atsushi Yamada
Kōichi Tanaka (田中康一, Tanaka Kōichi), who usually goes by as Tanaka (田中さん, Tanaka-san), is a young Japanese business man who is the only regular customer at Neko Rahmen, despite rarely receiving a decent meal. Tanaka plays the straight man to the easily excitable and scheming Taishō. He is extremely diplomatic and polite, but will try to intervene to soothe Taishō when he gets agitated.
Mii-chan
A "youngster" hired by Taisho to help him run his shop. As she is a cat, she usually will be sleeping instead of working. A recurring gag is she often has a new litter of kittens which Taisho tries to unload on Tanaka and other customers.
Mimi-chan
The only kitten of Mii-chan who has stayed with her. She is another cat working for Taisho, and like her mother, sleeps and plays more than actually works. A recurring gag is Amaiya can never tell the difference between the two.
Second-Shop Guy
Another part-timer hired by Taisho. He is an older man with glasses and a beard, who seems to accept working for cat treats like some of Taisho's other employees. Tanaka has commented his ramen is no better than Taisho's. Never officially named, he's nicknamed "the Second-Shop Guy" as he relocates to run Taisho's second location. A running gag is that every time Tanaka visits, its profession has changed (electronic shop, outlet mall, etc.) and its always packed. Another gag with him is he never says anything but, "Well...yeah,"
Shige-chan
A kleptomaniac bum who worked for Taisho. Taisho seems oblivious to when Shige-chan steals from the register or from customers. He eventually came back to work for Taisho's curry shop. Shige never says anything and has an unusual habit of striking a pot with a ladle. Despite his compulsion to steal, it is shown in a special manga chapter that he has a caring heart when he gave pieces of his only food to a hungry bird, dog, and baby and later saved Taisho from a fall.
Taisho's father
A successful kitten model drawn with very wide cute eyes and a bow on one of his ears. He tried to make Taisho follow in his footsteps, but seems to accept his son's ramen shop. Because of his cuteness, Tanaka first thought he was a girl. His real name is William Thomas Jefferson II. Taisho's father loves curry to the point he can forget about scolding Taisho for a misdeed.
Taisho's mother
She resembles Taisho aside from some aged marks and wearing a more feminine apron. She does not approve of Taisho's choice of work, and wishes him for to be married to a pedigree girl, much to his exasperation.
Taisho's brothers
Taisho's younger brothers, who often visit their elder brother's shop. They wish to become kitten models like their father, much to Taisho's annoyance.
Mariko (まりこ)
Tanaka's crush. She finds Taisho amusing, and continually ticks him off with innocent comments like being a dog person or seeing ramen as hobo food. Taisho considers her a witch for her insulting comments and how she seemingly ignores Tanaka's affections (as she is dating Akkun). Tanaka seems to lose some affection for her after seeing how she treats Akkun, restricting his diet to water and small fruits and forcing him to exercise.
Miki
A girl Taisho developed a huge crush on (though Tanaka had first believed it was her cat Taisho was talking about). She left overseas to study as a pianist, and has left her cat, Goro, under Taisho's care.
Goro
Miki's (male) cat that currently is living with Taisho. Tanaka had thought Goro was a girl and was Taisho's crush until Taisho (angrily) corrected him.
Tetsu
Taisho's muscular friend who is always playing weird card games with Taisho. His occupation is a truck driver. He was a construction worker that was saving his cash up to buy his own truck and began going to Taisho's ramen stand as Taisho kindly gave him ramen for a cheap price. The two quickly became friends as they talked about their dreams. After Taisho tried to teach Tetsu how to work a crane to help him get his truck faster, they accidentally wrecked his stand. Tetsu gave all his savings to help Taisho back on his feet, allowing him to open his shop. By the time Taisho finally opened his shop, Tetsu had now become a truck driver and was there to celebrate the opening.
Toku
An old man who works as a part-timer for Taisho. He is spacey and perhaps somewhat senile and is willing to work for glasses of milk (what Taisho was paying him). He has a twin brother named Taku.
Taku
Taku's twin brother who resembles him except for slightly thicker facial hair and a very short temper. He also works for Taisho's ramen shop.
Taiichi Amaiya
A full-time worker for Taisho, he was held back in high school for many years. Amaiya has had a face like an old man's since he was five years old, which has had people mistaken him for an adult. This led to shop owners believing he was at their stores to buy cigarettes and beer, which led to him having a reputation as a terrifying delinquent. However, Amaiya's face and reputation caused him to have a poor outlook at himself. However, Taisho was the first to ever call him a "boy", which has led to him becoming very respectful and idolizing of Taisho. He is one of the few people who absolutely adores Taisho's ramen and has seemed to become the second in management in the ramen stand after Taisho. A recurring gag is Amaiya can never tell Mii-chan or Mimi-chan apart, even when he has put a bow on one of them.
Akkun
Mariko's boyfriend who resembles a typical handsome bishounen. He has an enormous appetite and can eat anything, regardless of what it is made of or how it tastes. As such, he likes Taisho's ramen, even the weirdest of creations. Taisho often uses him for eating contests, such as offering customers free ramen if they can eat more than Akkun (which no human can). However, Mariko says he hanly good looks so she worries about him getting fat. As such, she forces crazy exercise regimens and dietary restrictions on him, which he seemingly accepts.
Soup
Taisho's pet Dachshund. She is the daughter of Mariko's dog, Mary, and was given to Taisho without his consent. Taisho initially thought she was a boy (Mariko told him later) and named her Soup after she enjoyed a bowl of soup he made when he had no other thing to feed her. Taisho eventually warmed up to the puppy and has kept her ever since.
Washio
Mariko's friend who adores ramen and cats. As expected, she immediately falls in love with Taisho and his shop and comes more than Taisho wants. She is overbearing and often intrusive on him, as she forces grooming and nail-clipping on him. Surprisingly, Washio is from a very rich family, as she can afford owning a purebred superstar cat like Patricia.
Patricia
Taisho's little sister who is a cat model like their father. He gets along with her the best. She resembles their father, but has the strict and tidy personality of their mother, which leads to her scolding Taisho about his cleaning and dietary habits. It was revealed later she is owned by Washio, who is rich enough to afford her.

== Adaptation ==
The manga was adapted in a 2008 feature film directed by Minoru Kawasaki, titled Pussy Soup is English.
