= Animal Academy: Hakobune Hakusho =

Japanese manga series

- Cover of Animal Academy: Hakobune Hakusho as published by Mag Garden

はこぶね白書 (Hakobune Hakusho)
- Manga
- Written by: Moyamu Fujino
- Published by: Mag Garden
- English publisher: NA: Tokyopop; JManga
- Magazine: Monthly Comic Blade
- Original run: October 30, 2005 – April 30, 2008
- Volumes: 7

Animal Academy: Hakobune Hakusho (Japanese: はこぶね白書, Hepburn: Hakobune Hakusho; lit. 'Noah's Ark White Paper') is a Japanese manga series illustrated and written by Moyamu Fujino. The manga was first serialized in the Japanese shōnen manga magazine Monthly Comic Blade on October 30, 2005, published by Mag Garden. It was first released in North America on May 12, 2009, by Tokyopop.

== Plot ==
Neko Fukuta is trying to enroll into a good high school, and finds Morimori Academy her last resort. She manages to get in after begging, and discovers that the academy is actually a school for animals that can shape-shift into humans, and has to pretend that she can change into a cat. The series follows Neko's adventures and experiences at the mysterious and prosperous Morimori Academy.

== Characters ==
Neko Fukuta
The series' protagonist. She has short, light brown hair and is depicted as cheerful and friendly to others, but is bad at her studies. She managed to get into Morimori Academy by begging to be let in and answering three odd questions: Can you keep cool if you know the truth? Can you get along with others? Can you conceal that you are a human? She met and befriended Miiko prior to enrolling when she was on a train. Neko is the one of only three humans at the academy, and keeps her true identity hidden by pretending to be a cat (her name literally means "cat" in Japanese). Though, as the series progresses, Neko begins to feel confused and most likely out of place, especially after learning that Yuichi is actually a fox. Feeling that she doesn't belong at Morimori Academy, Neko tearfully tells Miiko that she's a human and leaves. She spends time at her home, still deeply confused and lost and doesn't know how to fix her problem. When Kotaro helps her realize that she doesn't have to be an animal to be connected and be happy with her friends, she returns to the school with stronger confidence. Neko has a crush on Sasuke and confesses to him, but he's extremely dense in love and doesn't really notice anything different about her.
Miiko Suzuhara
The first person Neko befriended from Morimori academy. Miiko has wavy blue hair done up in two high ponytails, and is described by Neko to have eyes the color of a beautiful ocean. Miiko is rather quiet and unsociable, but is quite friendly towards her friends. She is actually a cat and dislikes others who are not her kind, often slapping them or yelling at them when they come too close to her. She is good friends with Neko, whom she affectionately nicknames "Fune" (the "fu" from "Fukuta" and "ne" from Neko), and often becomes jealous when Neko becomes friends with others. She seems to be completely oblivious when Neko tells her she's a human, and Neko has done so twice. The first time she thought Neko was joking, while the second time she believed it was only a dream. She is able to tell which animals people are by smell, and loves Neko's scent, whom she considers comforting. Over time, she slowly begins to mature a little bit and become more independent. The reason she comes to Morimori school is to be a human who can live with and say "I like you" to her beloved one-Teruo.
Kotaro Araki
Kotaro is one of Neko's classmates. He is a fox, and has spiky blonde hair in his human form. He is a bit of a troublemaker and has taken a liking to Miiko ever since she slapped the teacher when he pushed Kotaro into her desk. His affections are in vain, as Miiko often hits, slaps and frequently runs away from him, and dislikes him also because of his foxy smell. A first year student, class number one. It is thought he doesn't do well in school because his mind is always spinning.
Yuichi Takuma
A fox, but he mistook himself for a human. He is a short-haired redhead, is friendly and kind, does better in his studies than Neko, and says he is a lover of cats. He is good friends with Kotaro and becomes good friends with Neko soon after they meet. Neko's friendship with him causes some jealousy with Miiko at first, who seems to dislike Yuichi as well. After discovering that he was really a fox, he decided to leave the school and stated that he didn't want any of his friends to get hurt. Before leaving, he left Neko with tears, implying that he may have had feelings for her. Yuuichi also says he likes memorizing maps and locations. He's so good at transforming he doesn't realize he's doing it.
Umeka Kamaba
Very shy, polite, and meek, Umeka is the quietest of the class and has black hair worn in an unusual style: short at the front, fringe tied back in a flower clip (which she cannot transform into her human form without) and the rest left long and tied in two low ponytails. It is revealed in chapter 6 that she has a sister. She is a little flustered when around new people or people of the opposite gender, and is often too shy to ask people for help. Neko affectionately calls her "Ume-chan". She is a tanuki in her animal form and is omnivorous. She seems to look up to Kotaro.
Sasuke Sagami
Sasuke is quiet, rather aloof and expressionless, but has a caring side for others, such as finding Umeka's flower clip for her (he got Kotaro to give it to her) and tried to steal cold medicine for Neko when she got sick. Sasuke has a twin brother called Yusuke, and they look extremely alike. However, the two don't seem to be on good terms with each other, as he is actually Yusuke's enemy and is constantly counter-attacking his brother's actions. He has been seen smiling when talking to Neko, who he seems to greatly care about. He has sworn to protect Neko, and is doing whatever he can to make sure that she won't leave the academy. Sasuke is really a human and is using his trusted black cat, Kurou, to hide his identity. Sasuke regrets a lot of things in his past, and came to MoriMori because he wanted his feelings to be locked away by an old school headmistress.
Yusuke Sagami
Yusuke is Sasuke's twin brother, but despite looking extremely alike, he is quite different. Yusuke is a lot more outgoing and friendly. He is rather touchy-feely, doing things such as hugging Neko and Miiko unexpectedly. He is the only character so far that can hug Miiko (who dislikes him a lot) and emerge unscathed. Behind his "kind" personality is a rather dark and ominous nature. It isn't very clear if he cares for Sasuke's well-being, as he tends to roughly man-handle his brother, doing things such as pushing him, grabbing his collar, and even tying him to a tree with rope and threatening his life. He seems to be a dark character and won't let anyone get in his way, and seems to see Neko as an eyesore to his plans. Yusuke is actually a ninja who surveys the school to bring information to the human side, and is determined to rid the academy of humans, which is why he was trying to make Neko leave. To keep his true identity hidden, he's using his own black cat, Shirou, as a cover-up.
Watanuki
Watanuki is the homeroom teacher of the white class, and is one of the few people who know that Neko is human. Watanuki also doesn't hesitate to hit children on the head as punishment when they misbehave. He's a raccoon.
Reira Eisenji
Reira is a raccoon in her animal form, and a somewhat bossy girl, who is in the same class as Neko. She and two other friends entered Neko and Miiko's room when they discovered that it was open, to ask how to open doors. When first meeting Miiko, she was slapped across the face by her, who said that she stunk like a raccoon.
Silvino Karamatsu
Silvino likes to paint and is very serious. He doesn't like when people talk and prefers quiet. For some reason, Sasuke's personality changes when he talks to him. Silvino is a snake. Silvino is expressionless with others, and sometimes mean.
Wakaba Usuu
One of Reira's friends. She has long, straight, black hair and is presumably a raccoon. She hates humans, and does not wish to be one, but has a reason.
Umako Koyanagi
The class president of Neko's class. Her animal form is a fox.
Teruo Suzuhara
Teruo is Miiko's owner. He's her beloved person and the reason why she wants to be a human.
Giten
A white snake with a purple stripe that has a tendency to appear unexpectedly. When it follows Neko, Miiko tends to attack it. At first Neko assumes that it's a student, but she is not entirely sure. However, it may have a connection to the Morimori Handbook, which seems to always return to Neko after Yusuke steals it, much to his frustration. It turns out to be part of the headmaster, along with the handbook.

== Publication history ==
- Volume 1 ISBN 1-4278-1095-8 Release date: May 12, 2009
- Volume 2 ISBN 1-4278-1096-6 Release date: September 1, 2009
- Volume 3 ISBN 1-4278-1097-4 Release date: February 2, 2010
- Volume 4 ISBN 1-4278-1098-2 Release date: March 30, 2010
- Volume 5 ISBN 1-4278-1631-X Release date: August 3, 2010
- Volume 6 ISBN 1-4278-1632-8 Release date: November 29, 2010
- Volume 7 ISBN 1-4278-1633-6 Release date: March 1, 2011
