= Neco (name) =

Neco may refer to:

- Neco (1895–1977), Brazilian footballer Manoel Nunes
- Neco (footballer, born 1933), Brazilian footballer Manoel Tavares
- Neco (footballer, born 1964), Brazilian football winger and manager Manoel Carlos de Lima Filho
- Neco Brett (born 1992), Jamaican footballer
- Neco Celik (born 1972), Turkish-German filmmaker
- Neco Martínez (born 1982), Colombian football goalkeeper
- Neço Muko (1899–1934), Albanian singer and composer
- Neco Williams (born 2001), Welsh footballer
- Danilo Neco (born 1986), Brazilian footballer
- Necati Arabaci (born 1972), nicknamed "Neco", Turkish-German businessman, outlaw biker, gangster and high-ranking member of the Hells Angels Motorcycle Club
- Neco, a pharaoh mentioned several times in the Bible - probably Necho II (610–595 BC)

== See also ==
- Necho (disambiguation)
