= Pussy Soup =

- Poster
- Directed by: Minoru Kawasaki
- Cinematography: Fuminori Nishigaki
- Release date: November 28, 2008
- Running time: 80 minutes
- Country: Japan
- Language: Japanese

Neko Ramen Taisho (Japanese: 日猫ラーメン大将, Hepburn: Neko Ramen Taisho; lit. 'The Cat (who is a) Ramen-shop Owner'), also known in English as Pussy Soup, is a 2008 Japanese comedy film directed by Minoru Kawasaki. It is an adaptation of the manga Neko Ramen.

== Plot ==
A young white cat is promised to a life as a super-model cat like his father. But to escape the toxic relationship with the latter, he opens a ramenya.

== Reception ==
A review found that: "In the end, ‘Neko Ramen Taisho’ doesn't work simply because there just isn't enough to work with here. The story is weak as water and most of the humour falls flat, with even the puppet thing getting old very quickly. If you like the sound of the idea, do yourself a favour and pick up the series instead."

The film is ranked number 6 in the list of Asian cat films established by AsianMoviePlus, who warns the reader that the cat in the film is "a puppet who contemplates suicide and deals with father issues, fame and the search for himself. Let's just say that cuteness was never so paranoid."

The book The Planet According to the Movies states of Pussy Soup: "This is the best and most misleading movie title in this book." The film has been called a "criminally underrated work" and "a mixture of Garfield and Tampopo".

Pussy Soup was screened at the Nippon Connection Filmfestival, in Frankfurt in 2009.

== Home video release ==
A DVD version was released in Japan on May 29, 2009.
