= Deaimon =

Japanese manga series

- Cover of Deaimon volume 1 by Kadokawa Shoten

であいもん
- Manga
- Written by: Rin Asano
- Published by: Kadokawa Shoten
- Magazine: Young Ace
- Original run: May 2, 2016 – present
- Volumes: 20
- Anime television series
- Directed by: Fumitoshi Oizaki
- Written by: Reiko Yoshida
- Music by: Ren Takada
- Studio: Encourage Films
- Licensed by: Crunchyroll; SA/SEA: Medialink
- Original network: AT-X, Tokyo MX, KBS Kyoto, SUN, BS11
- Original run: April 6, 2022 – June 22, 2022
- Episodes: 12

Deaimon (であいもん) (Note: While deai (出会い) means "new encounter", "to meet someone new", mon (もん), as an abbreviation of mono (もの), means "thing", deaimon (であいもん) means the various seasonal food which is suitable to be cooked with each other.) is a Japanese manga series by Rin Asano. It has been serialized in Kadokawa Shoten's seinen manga magazine Young Ace since May 2016. An anime television series adaptation by Encourage Films aired from April to June 2022.

== Plot ==
The series is set in a Kyoto wagashi store. The protagonist is an only son, Nagomu Irino, who has dreams of becoming a member of a band, and ran away from home to live in Tokyo ten years ago. He receives a letter from home stating his father is in the hospital and asking him to take over the family shop, so he gives up on his dream and returns home.

While he's been gone, however, a ten-year-old girl named Itsuka Yukihira has started working in the shop. Nagomu's mom, having become a foster mom to Itsuka during the time that Nagomu was seeking his dream as a band member, declares that there will be a contest between Itsuka and Nagomu to see who will take over the family shop.

== Characters ==
Nagomu Irino (納野 和, Irino Nagomu)
Voiced by: Nobunaga Shimazaki
The protagonist. After graduating from college, Nagomu left Ryokushō (緑松)—the family wagashi store—in order to pursue his dream of becoming a musician in Tokyo. When his father was hospitalized ten years after he left, Nagomu returned home to work in the family store.
Itsuka Yukihira (雪平 一果, Yukihira Itsuka)
Voiced by: Kozue Yūki
A hardworking girl who lives at Nagomu's parents' home. Ten years old at the beginning of the story. She has been living in the Irino home for the past year, receiving room and board for helping out in the store. Nagomu's father wants her to inherit the store, and she's declared she won't lose the shop to Nagomu, the rightful heir to the store.
Heigo Irino (納野 平伍, Irino Heigo)
Voiced by: Rikiya Koyama
Nagomu's father. The owner of Ryokushō.
Fuki Irino (納野 富紀, Irino Fuki)
Voiced by: Sayaka Ohara
Nagomu's mother.
Masa Tatsumi (巽 政, Tatsumi Masa)
Voiced by: Hiroshi Iwasaki
Auntie Otsuru (お鶴さん, Otsuru-san)
Voiced by: Satsuki Yukino
Saki Seto (瀬戸 咲季, Seto Saki)
Voiced by: Takuma Nagatsuka
Mitsuru Horikawa (堀河 美弦, Horikawa Mitsuru)
Voiced by: Minori Suzuki
Kanoko Matsukaze (松風 佳乃子, Matsukaze Kanoko)
Voiced by: Minami Takahashi
Hiiro Kisaichi (私市 緋色, Kisaichi Hiiro)
Voiced by: Saori Hayami
Shinri Yukihira (雪平 真理, Yukihira Shinri)
Voiced by: Maaya Sakamoto
Itsuka's mother.
Tomoe Yukihira (雪平 巴, Yukihira Tomoe)
Voiced by: Yoshitsugu Matsuoka
Itsuka's father.
Masayo Irino (納野 倭世, Irino Masayo)
Voiced by: Miho Yoshida
Nagomu's grandmother.
Ikkō Irino (納野 一光, Irino Ikkō)
Voiced by: Izō Oikawa
Nagomu's deceased grandfather.

== Media ==
=== Manga ===
Deaimon is written and illustrated by Rin Asano. It began serialization in Kadokawa Shoten's seinen manga magazine Young Ace on May 2, 2016, and has been collected in twenty tankōbon volumes from Kadokawa Comics Ace as of November 2025.

No.	Japanese release date	Japanese ISBN
1	December 3, 2016	978-4-04-104880-1
2	May 2, 2017	978-4-04-105538-0
3	October 3, 2017	978-4-04-106092-6
4	March 2, 2018	978-4-04-106551-8
5	August 4, 2018	978-4-04-107160-1
6	December 29, 2018	978-4-04-107731-3
7	June 4, 2019	978-4-04-108234-8
8	December 28, 2019	978-4-04-108935-4
9	June 25, 2020	978-4-04-109467-9
10	November 4, 2020	978-4-04-109468-6
11	May 1, 2021	978-4-04-111365-3
12	October 4, 2021	978-4-04-111805-4
13	April 4, 2022	978-4-04-111806-1
14	September 2, 2022	978-4-04-112860-2
15	May 2, 2023	978-4-04-113514-3
16	October 4, 2023	978-4-04-114128-1
17	March 26, 2024	978-4-04-114752-8
18	March 4, 2025	978-4-04-115484-7; 978-4-04-115681-0 (SE)
19	May 2, 2025	978-4-04-116132-6
20	November 4, 2025	978-4-04-116677-2
21	June 4, 2026	9784041174326

=== Anime ===
An anime adaptation of the manga was announced on April 20, 2021. It was later confirmed to be a television series produced by Encourage Films and directed by Fumitoshi Oizaki, with Reiko Yoshida overseeing the series' scripts, Sakae Shibuya designing the characters and serving as chief animation director, and Ren Takada composing the music. It aired from April 6 to June 22, 2022, on AT-X and other networks. The opening theme song is "Sumire" by Maaya Sakamoto, while the ending theme song is "Koko ni Aru Yakusoku" by the special unit Deaimon. Crunchyroll streamed the series.

==== Episodes ====
No.	Title	Directed by	Written by	Storyboarded by	Original release date
1	"Nagomu and Itsuka"; Transliteration: "Nagomu to Itsuka" (Japanese: 和と一果)	Yūma Imura; Chuan Feng Xu	Reiko Yoshida	Fumitoshi Oizaki	April 6, 2022
Thirty year old Nagomu Irino is stopped by a ten year old girl who mistook him for her father. Nagomu had moved away to Tokyo to pursue a failed music career, but has returned to his family sweet shop in Kyoto thinking his father Heigo is ill. However, he finds Heigo robustly healthy. Heigo announces since Nagomu never learned sweet making he is an unworthy successor and the shop will be inherited by Yukihira Itsuka, the girl from the train who has been lodging and working at the shop. Nagomu learns Yukihira's father, a guitar player like Nagomu, abandoned her. Nagumo's mother, Fuki, tells Nagumo if he intends to stay he should support Yukihira like a surrogate father. Nagomu tells Yukihira his grandfather thought he didn't have the right temperament to be a sweet maker so he started learning music and eventually moved away. Yukihira takes an order for 100 handmade sweets that turns out to be a prank. Afraid of disappointing the family Yukihira tries to sell the sweets on the street and is surprised when Nagumo makes a fool of himself playing a silly song on his guitar to attract customers. While unsure if he is surrogate father worthy Nagumo decides to continue supporting Yukihira regardless.
2	"Echoing Through the Hydrangea"; Transliteration: "Yohira ni Hibiku" (Japanese: 四葩に響く)	Kenta Ōnishi	Reiko Yoshida	Fumitoshi Oizaki	April 13, 2022
Nagomu notices Mitsuru Horikawa, a worker at Ryokusho, who supports Ryokusho by allowing them to sell her handmade phone charms. It is revealed Mitsuru works at Ryokusho because her deceased grandmother loved their sweets. Mitsuru helps support her parents and four siblings but is also secretly the amateur online musician Neon. Itsuku notices Neon's phone charm on one of her videos and realises Neon is Mitsuru. Her fans also recognise the charm and Ryokusho is blitzed with phone calls by fans of Neon, causing a major inconvenience. Feeling guilty, Mitsuru offers to quit Ryokusho and quit performing as Neon. She is also afraid of telling her parents. Nagumo refuses to let her quit the guitar and to ensure she doesn't leave her family like he did, personally begs Mitsuru's mother to allow her to continue as Neon. Mitsuru is surprised when her parents support her desire for a musical career. The exposure has also generated higher sweet sales for Ryokusho so Mitsuro keeps her job. She also watches videos of Nagumo with his band and likes their music so she makes Nagumo a personalised phone charm. He in turn gives her misshapen sweets that can't be sold. Mitsuru believes Nagomu is a good person but Itsuku is still unsure.
3	"A Summer Night's Accompaniment"; Transliteration: "Natsuyoi Bayashi" (Japanese: 夏宵囃子)	Fumihiro Ueno	Reiko Yoshida	Keiei Yūzumi！	April 20, 2022
Yukihira awakens from a dream of her father promising to take her to the local festival. As the festival is soon Nagomu offers to take her but she refuses. On her way to school Itsuka sees another young man with a guitar and, desperately wanting it to be her father, follows him. Learning what happened, Nagomu goes to find her while Ryokusho's employees try to keep it a secret from Heigo. Itsuka becomes lost and is helped by a young woman named Matsukaze Kanoko, visiting from Tokyo, whose boyfriend had promised to take her to the festival before breaking up with her. Nagomu finds them and it is revealed he is Kanoko's ex. She is surprised he is learning the sweet business while trying to be a father figure for Itsuka and realises she missed him, though she hides this. Nagomu invites her to Ryokusho where Kanoko witnesses how incompetent Nagomu is and while angrily showing him how to perform customer service impresses his mother. Itsuka wonders why Nagomu hid her skipping school from Heigo and when the time comes for the festival she is convinced by Kanoko to go with Nagomu, as practise for when her real father can take her. Determined to stay in Kyoto, but not really knowing why, Kanoko gets a job at a tea shop nearby.
4	"A Blue Wind Rustling Fresh Leaves"; Transliteration: "Kaze Aoshi" (Japanese: 風青し)	Nanako Shimazaki	Hitomi Amamiya	Hitoyuki Matsui	April 27, 2022
4	"Beating the Summer Heat"; Transliteration: "Shokibarai" (Japanese: 暑気払い)	Nanako Shimazaki	Hitomi Amamiya	Hitoyuki Matsui	April 27, 2022
The Tsukiyami family suddenly cancels their weekly order. The heir to the Tsukiyami family, Tadashi, had seen a picture of a young woman on the phone of Saki, Ryokusho's employee, and fell in love with her. When Saki refused to reveal her identity Tadashi cancelled their order. Nagomu later spots the girl but realises it is Saki cross-dressing. Saki explains he does so to relieve stress, but now it has caused a problem for Ryokusho he decides to never cross-dress again. Nagomu has Heigo make a special sweet, which Saki gives to Tadashi while cross-dressing, claiming she is Saki's cousin but is engaged to be married. Tadashi is disappointed but moves on. During a heat wave Kanoko invites Itsuka, Saki and Nagomu to the pool. As he cannot swim Nagomu sits alone. He asks Kanoko why she decided to stay but she claims it just seemed right at the time. She asks about his guitar and he complains that learning the hand movements for sweet making has ruined his guitar movements, so playing has become difficult. Saki suggests water slides, revealing to Nagomu it was secretly Itsuka's idea so Nagomu could join in without sinking. At a concert nearby Itsuka's father, Tomoe is shown playing. Kanoko reveals to Itsuka seeing Nagomu finally committing himself to something makes her happy, despite their breakup.
5	"Welcoming the Spirits"; Transliteration: "Oshorai-san" (Japanese: おしょらいさん)	Sō Toyama	Hitomi Amamiya	Naotaka Hayashi	May 4, 2022
Itsuka separately meets Mitsuru and Kanoko and decide to go for lunch. Mitsuru and Kanoko are friendly but Itsuka is on edge as both girls know the other has some link with Nagomu. Visiting a shrine both Mitsuru and Kanoku draw bad luck O-mikuji but Itsuka draws a good luck that claims the person she is waiting for is merely running late but will arrive soon. They visit a second shrine dedicated to Tajimamori, the god of sweets. Itsuka hopes the two become friends but realises a lot of their true feelings, especially concerning Nagomu, are unspoken and so more worrying. Nagomu has several dreams about his deceased grandfather, Ikko, who originally opened Ryokusho. Ryokusho closes for an Obon for Ikko. His grandmother, Masayo, also attends. Nagomu sees Masayo tests their sweets to make sure they are maintaining the standards set by Ikko. Masayo decides to help instruct Nagomu, but she is an even more savage instructor than Heigo, striking Nagomu with a Keisaku stick to keep him in line. Nagomu is happy when Masayo is determined to see him grow into a sweet maker worthy to inherit Ikko's legacy, but for that she intends to train with her Keisaku so she can train Nagomu even more harshly.
6	"Autumn's Potato Moon"; Transliteration: "Imo Meigetsu" (Japanese: 芋名月)	Yūma Imura	Reiko Yoshida	Royden B	May 11, 2022
Itsuka's school holds its district sports festival in which whole families compete together. Heigo insists they will compete as Itsuka's family. Nagomu asks if Itsuka wants him for the parent/child race, but is rejected. On the day of the festival Itsuka is sad her real father is absent, yet Nagomu's cheering makes her feel better. Heigo injures his back and can't compete with Nagomu in the parent/child race, so Itsuka agrees to race with Nagomu, having overheard him earlier claiming Itsuka is a precious member of his family. Together they win the prize for best father/daughter team. Itsuka refuses to pose with Nagomu for a photograph but is shown smiling anyway. Itsuka's mother, Shinri, appears at Ryokushou. Shinri reveals thanks to her husband she had to hire a detective to find Itsuka and now wants Itsuka to live with her in France, especially as she considers Nagomu too similar to her husband to be a good role model. She finally reunites with Itsuka at a tea shop. Nagomu and his family are upset Itsuka will be leaving and are surprised when she comes back. Shinri explains that after talking with Itsuka she realised Ryokushou is actually the best place for her and so is letting her stay, though she makes Nagomu responsible for sending her photos of Itsuka as often as possible.
7	"Dancing in Autumn Colors"; Transliteration: "Shūshoku ni Mau" (Japanese: 秋色に舞う)	Chuan Feng Xu	Fukurō Kamiza	Chuan Feng Xu	May 18, 2022
Ryokushou hires a new apprentice, Kisaichi Hiiro, a serious young woman who is determined to work with her idol, Ryokushou's employee Tatsumi Masa. She is unimpressed with Nagomu. Heigo worries Hiiro is obsessed with perfection. Tadashi orders sweets for his family's next tea ceremony at the local school. Hiiro considers anything not directly related to sweet making pointless, so she struggles interacting with customers and insults Nagomu . Itsuka defends Nagomu as he at least cares about customers. Masa scolds them for arguing near customers, upsetting Hiiro who feels she has disappointed him. Masa advises her to learn from her mistakes and Hiiro is surprised Masa remembers her from her days as a confectionary student. The tea ceremony instructor becomes ill so Tadashi cancels his sweet order, until Nagomu suggests replacing the tea ceremony with a sweet making lesson. One of the students, Naruto Miyu, becomes upset that her mother laughs at her clumsy attempts. She claims it is because Miyu is cute when she sulks so she can't help smiling, until Nagomu points out that even good natured laughter can have an embarrassing effect on someone's self-confidence. The mother apologises and the lesson is a success. Hiiro is impressed by Nagomu and thanks him for including her in the lesson.
8	"Chestnut Retrospective"; Transliteration: "Kuri Kaiko" (Japanese: くり回顧)	Hisanori Kobayashi	Reiko Yoshida	Sō Toyama; Fumitoshi Oizaki	May 25, 2022
Kanoko remembers how she met Nagomu when she was drunk and began dating. Then when Nagomu decided to return to Ryokushou she broke up with him hoping it would make him stay, but he went anyway. She admits to herself she came to Kyoto to be near him. Visiting Ryokushou she finds Nagomu panicking over losing his chestnut helmet at the sports festival. Itsuka asks about the helmet and he explains when his band was struggling to come up with a band name they ate chestnut manjū, decided it was a perfect name, and had chestnut helmets made. Kanoko calls Takumi, one of Nagomu's former band-mates, about the helmet and while talking he admits the band all knew Nagomu wanted to return to Ryokushou, so they split up to let him go. He advises her that, since she went all the way to Kyoto to be near Nagomu, to try reconciling. On Halloween Itsuka spots a classmate wearing the helmet, trades her costume for it, and returns it to Nagomu. Nagomu reveals since Kanoko called Takumi they began texting and he is now talking to all his band-mates again, so he thanks her with chestnut manjū.
9	"Long-Awaited Warmth of Spring"; Transliteration: "Ichiyō Raifuku" (Japanese: 一陽来復)	Yūji Kanzaki	Fukurō Kamiza	Tomomi Mochizuki	June 1, 2022
With Christmas approaching Nagomu asks to spend Itsuka's birthday with her, but is rejected. Shinri asks to visit Itsuka on Christmas Eve. Itsuka is unsure as her mother has precedent for breaking promises at the last minute. Nagomu breaks the shop's wooden Yuzu juicer. Nagomu remembers that he was born on the 15th of December but came home from hospital on the 22nd, the winter solstice, so his grandpa bought the juicer as Yuzu is associated with that time of year. Nagomu decides to get the juicer repaired. Kanoko accidentally reveals the date of Nagomu's birthday to Itsuka, who feels guilty at not knowing it and invites him to spend her next birthday together in March. Itsuka spends Christmas Eve with her mother. While practising how to invite Nagomu to see the Christmas lights, Mitsuru is accidentally successful and Nagomu agrees to go, not realising it was supposed to be a date, so when Kanoko also asks to go with him he takes them both. Seeing how in love Mitsuru is with Nagomu Kanoko wonders if it might be better to step aside. Mitsuru wonders the same seeing how Nagomu and Kanoko have history and are comfortable together. After both girls give him gifts Nagomu decides to play a song as a gift in return which draws a crowd and even Itsuka stops to listen.
10	"Reminiscing About Waiting for Spring"; Transliteration: "Haru Machi Shinobu" (Japanese: 春待ち偲ぶ)	Fumihiro Ueno	Hitomi Amamiya	Hideki Futamura	June 8, 2022
Heigo decides to close Ryokushou for the New Year. Itsuka receives New Year's money from both Nagumo and his parents. An elderly man is disappointed they are closed as he wanted sweets for his mother's grave as he hasn't visited in years and doesn't want to go empty handed. Nagumo secretly gives him Hanabiramochi he made during training, since they can't be sold, and Itsuka helps. While visiting the shrine Heigo suggests he knows what they did and approves. For the beginning of Spring Ryokushou sells Japanese plum sweets. Nagumo's childhood friend Harumi, her mother Otsuru and children Yuu and Koume visit. Koume is upset after her friend Shige teased her about her name Koume containing the word Ume, a sour plum, so she insists on changing her name to Monaka after her favourite anime character. A girl named Umeka visits with a gift from her dying grandfather for a Geisha named Koume he met at Ryokushou 40 years ago. The Geisha is revealed to be Koume's grandmother Otsuru, who almost married Umeka's grandfather but was rejected by his parents. The gift is her hair ornament he kept for 40 years and is now returning. After hearing their story Koume decides she likes her name after all.
11	"Is It Good"; Transliteration: "Yoki ka na" (Japanese: よきかな)	Sō Toyama	Fukurō Kamiza	Keiei Yūzumi！	June 15, 2022
Nagomu falls ill and while sleeping dreams about an older student, his Senpai, in high school. Mitsuru brings him drinks but is so embarrassed at being near him she flees. Nagomu learned guitar from his Senpai who was grateful that Ryokushou helped convince him to move out of his father's house and start his own life. Kanoko also visits, exasperated at Nagomu not looking after himself. The Senpai left for Tokyo and Nagomu never saw him again. He awakens and finds Itsuka caring for him, so he tells her about his Senpai and hopes he might visit Ryokushou one day. The day before Valentine's Day it begins snowing so Nagomu makes Zenzai soup from mochi and kombu. Kanoko visits and tries the soup, happy it was made by Nagomu and wonders about giving him valentines chocolates. Itsuka acts strangely and Nagomu realises when her father left her at Ryokushou it was snowing and the first meal they gave her was Zenzai, giving her bad memories. He convinces Itsuka to play in the snow with him and they make snowmen, even though they are scolded by Fuki for risking their health and neglecting their work. They later warm up with the Zenzai. The next day Nagomu is happy when he receives chocolates from Itsuka.
12	"Red Sea Bream for a Spring Dawn"; Transliteration: "Shungyō ni Tai" (Japanese: 春暁に鯛)	Yūma Imura	Reiko Yoshida	Fumitoshi Oizaki	June 22, 2022
Itsuka's birthday approaches, meaning she must keep her promise to spend the day with Nagomu. The Ryokushou employees decide to make her cake from wagashi. A Hanami festival is also approaching so Heigo plans to make Sakuramochi and is impressed when Nagomu suggests edible gold leaf. Heigo also notices Nagomu has stopped making mistakes and so he starts teaching him more closely. Itsuka is likewise impressed Nagomu has matured from his unreliable past. Nagomu takes Itsuka to an amusement park and zoo, an activity she once did with her father. Nagomu panics upon realising he left his days schedule at Ryokushou but Itsuka assures him they can just improvise. After enjoying themselves Itsuka is distracted by a lost child, only to become lost herself when she loses sight of Nagomu and begins to panic as her memories of abandonment reappear. When she finds him she runs to him but hides how upset she was. Nagomu later gets a picture of Itsuka smiling he sends to her mother before returning to Ryokushou for the birthday party. Later, Nagomu reveals he noticed Itsuka was looking for her father at the park and assures her she will see him again and will just have to wait at Ryokushou until that happens.

== See also ==
- Tengai Retrogical – Another manga series by the same author
