= Necho =

Necho may refer to:

- Necho I (died 664 BC), Egyptian pharaoh of the 26th Dynasty
- Necho II (died 595 BC), Egyptian pharaoh of the 26th Dynasty
- Necho (crater), a crater on the Moon

== See also ==
- Neco (1895–1977), Brazilian footballer
- Neco (name), including a list of people
- Necco, a candy manufacturer
- Northern Essex Community College, or NECCO
- Neko (disambiguation)
