= Minene Sakurano =

Japanese manga artist

- 桜野 みねね
- Born: November 29, 1973 (age 52); Sendai, Japan
- Occupation: Manga artist
- Years active: 1995–present
- Notable work: Mamotte Shugogetten; Shōuindō no Emily: Sakurano Minene Short Story Collection; Jōshū Tōzoku Aratamegata Hinagiku Kenzan!; Healing Planet; Mamotte Shugogetten! Retrouvailles; Madoromyāna no Komoriuta; Yggdrasil Liveline; Hinagiku Kenzan: Ippon Ōkamachi-hen; Fairial Garden; Hoshi no Dai Circus

Minene Sakurano (桜野 みねね, Sakurano Minene; born 29 November 1973) is the pen name of a Japanese manga artist born on November 29 in Sendai, Miyagi Prefecture, Japan.

Sakurano made her debut in 1995 with her story Mother Doll, which tied for first place in the 1st Enix 21st Century Manga Prize contest, sharing the prize with Yasaka Mamiko's Kaze no Daidōzoku. Her representative work is Mamotte Shugogetten, which was adapted into an anime television series and an OVA series. After a dispute in 2001, Sakurano stopped publishing Shugogetten in Enix's Shōnen Gangan and moved the publication to Comic Blade, published by Mag Garden under the title Mamotte Shugogetten! Retrouvailles.

== Works ==
All works are listed chronologically.

=== Manga ===
- Mamotte Shugogetten! (11 volumes, 1996–2000, Shōnen Gangan)
- Shōuindō no Emily: Sakurano Minene Short Story Collection (1 volume, 1997, Gangan Comics)
- Jōshū Tōzoku Aratamegata Hinagiku Kenzan! (3 volumes, 1999–2001, Gangan Wing)
- Healing Planet (1 volume, 2000–2001, Shōnen Gangan)
- Mamotte Shugogetten! Retrouvailles (6 volumes, 2002–2005, Comic Blade)
- Madoromyāna no Komoriuta (2004, Comic Blade Masamune)
- Yggdrasil Liveline (2004–2005, Comic Blade Masamune)
- Hinagiku Kenzan: Ippon Ōkamachi-hen (1 volume, 2006–2007, Comic Blade Masamune)
- Fairial Garden (2007–2010, Comic Blade)
- Hoshi no Dai Circus (2011-ongoing, Comic Blade)

=== Art books ===
- Shitenrin (支天輪) (1999-04-18, Enix, ISBN 4-7575-0014-9)
- Days of Moonlight (2003, Mag Garden, ISBN 4-901926-95-0 (limited edition), ISBN 4-901926-97-7 (standard edition)

=== Anthologies ===
These are anthologies in which Sakurano's works appeared:

- Eris Futatabi... (エリス再び), (Super Comic Gekijō Vol.1: Tōshinden 2, Enix)
- Daichi no Ken (大地の剣), (Super Comic Gekijō Vol.2: Fire Emblem, Enix)
