= Monthly Comic Blade =

Japanese manga magazine

- July 2007 issue
- Categories: Shōnen manga
- First issue: February 2002
- Final issue: July 2014
- Company: Mag Garden
- Country: Japan
- Language: Japanese
- Website: Monthly Comic Blade; Online Magazine Comic Blade

Monthly Comic Blade (月刊コミックブレイド, Gekkan Komikku Bureido) was a Japanese shōnen manga magazine published by Mag Garden. It was first published in February 2002 and was sold on the 30 of each month until July 2014. It restarted in September 2014 as a free online magazine titled Online Magazine Comic Blade, which is updated on the 5, 15, 25 and 30 of each month. The manga series are published in tankōbon under the Blade Comics (ブレイドコミックス, Bureido Komikkusu) imprint.

== Serialized manga ==
- 13 Game (Misaki Ishikawa)
- A Girls (Masahiro Itabashi; art by Hiroyuki Tamakoshi)
- Akumagari (Seiuchirou Todono)
- Amanchu! (Kozue Amano)
- Amadeus Code (Mayumi Azuma & Tatsurou Nakanishi)
- Ame no Murakumono (Penguin Gunsō; art by Rusui Kazaniwa)
- Anime no Jikan (Toto Aoi)
- Ar tonelico -arpeggio- (ayamegumu)
- Ar tonelico II (ayamegumu)
- Ares (Narumi Seto)
- Aria (Kozue Amano)
- Atelier Rorona: Watashi no Takaramono (Houki Kusano)
- B.B. Girls (Kumichou)
- Babelheim no Shōnin (Shouichi Furumi)
- Bacchon Girls (Toshiko Machida)
- BaggataWay (Iroha Kohinata)
- Banana no Nana (Kakashi Oniyazu)
- Berry's (Sphere; art by Makoto Sakurai)
- Betsuni Iyarashi Imi Jyanaku Isshou ni Sun Demo Kamawanai yo Margaret (Hikaru Nikaidou)
- Beyond the Beyond (Yoshitomo Watanabe)
- Binchō-tan (Takahiko Ekusa)
- The Birth of Walküre (Hiroshi Fuji)
- Chichi Kogusa (Mi Tagawa) (transferred to Monthly Comic Garden)
- Clockwork (Yoshihiko Tomisawa; art by Sakaki Yoshioka)
- Corpse Party: Another Child (Team Gris Gris; art by Shunsuke Ogata)
- Crown (Tatsurō Nakanishi)
- Cry Eye (Akira Sorano)
- D.C. III: Kazami Gakuen Kōshiki Shinbun Bu - Okurairi Jikenbo (Circus & Jin Itou; art by Shizuma Miyano)
- Dance Dance Dance! (Yuzuka Morita)
- Datenshi Kanan (Yui Hara)
- Desert Coral (Wataru Murayama)
- Dorakuma (Seiuchirou Todono)
- Drc2 (Jin Itou; art by Makoto Fuugetsu)
- Dragon Sister! -Sangokushi Hyakka Ryōran- (Nini) (from Comic Blade Masamune)
- Dream Gold ~Knights in the Dark City~ (Tatsurō Nakanishi)
- E (Shinri Ōshiro; art by Sana Kirigaoka)
- Elemental Gelade (Mayumi Azuma)
- Eleven Soul (Seiuchirou Todono)
- Esprit (Taishi Tsutsui)
- Fatalizer (Ritz Kobayashi)
- Farial Garden (Minene Sakurano)
- Fukashigi Philia (Taishi Tsutsui)
- Gadget (Hiroyuki Etoh)
- Gakuen Psycho-Pass (Shina Soga)
- Gamerz Heaven (Maki Murakami)
- Ghost Hound: Another Side (adaptation; art by Kanata Asahi)
- The Glory of Walküre (Hiroshi Fuji) (from Comic Blade Masamune)
- Glory Road (Tatsurō Nakanishi; art by Sora Hiiragi)
- The Good Witch of the West (Noriko Ogiwara; art by Haruhiko Momokawa)
- Grisaia no Kajitsu ~L'oiseau bleu~ (Front Wing & Junichi Fujisaku; art by Taka Himeno)
- Gyakusatsu Mahō Shōjo Belial Strawberry (AKIRA; art by Sachi Kurafuji)
- Gyoukai Ijinden Jinkan: Hito no Aida wa Omoshiroku Ikiru - Kidani Takaaki Monogatari (Bushiroad & Satoru Akahori; art by Yasunari Ootsuki)
- Hakobune Hakusho (Moyamu Fujino)
- Hirameki Hatsume-chan (Daioki)
- Hitogatana (Onigunsou)
- Hoshi no Dai Circus (Minene Sakurano)
- Hoshi no Ue de Meguru (Yuusu Kurahashi)
- Hoshi no Witch (Yui Hara)
- Igazukin (Kanoka Tana) (from Comic Blade Masamune)
- Jagan Tantei Nekuro-san no Jikenbo (AKIRA; art by Sakura Kinoshita)
- Jinki: Extend (Sirou Tunasima)
- Junkyard Magnetic (Wataru Murayama)
- Kagerou Nostalgia ~ Shin Shou (Satomi Kubo)
- Kuroa Chimera (Kairi Sorano)
- Kimi to Shitai to Boku no Kaitou (Yogenme)
- Kyoraku Legion (Rin Asano) (from Comic Blade Brownie)
- Kyou, Curry! (Yae Shimano)
- Lost Seven (Kazuki Nakashima; art by Ko Yasung)
- M3: Sono Kuroki Hagane (Satelight; art by Kazuomi Minatogawa)
- Mahō Kabushikigaisha (Anri Sakano)
- Mahō Shōjo Pretty Bell (KAKERU)
- Mahō no Silver Bullet (Michihiro Matsuoka, Aotoki Kurobeni)
- Mahō Tsukai no Yome (Kore Yamazaki)
- Momo Tama (Nanae Chrono)
- Mamotte Shugogetten Retrouvailles (Minene Sakurano)
- Martyria (Misakikkusu Yumisaki)
- Meguraba (kirusu)
- Meiji Gasutou Youmushou Akaneya Yakumo (Kikori Morino)
- Minami Kamakura Kōkō Joshi Jitensha-Bu (Noriyuki Matsumoto)
- Mizunohe Monogatari (Miwa Mayuki)
- More Starlight to Your Heart (Hiro Matsuba)
- Mortal METAL Shibagane (Junichi Sato, Shoji Kawamori, and Satelight; art by Ryuuichi Sadamatsu)
- Mother Keeper (Kairi Sorano)
- MUZZLE-LOADER ~Wellber no Monogatari~ (BOYAKASHA; art by Naruse Takami)
- Neko Rahmen (Kenji Sonishi) (from Comic Blade Masamune) (ongoing)
- New Paradise (Sakura Kinoshita)
- Otogi-Jūshi Akazukin (Shogo Kumasaka; art by Hiiro Yuki)
- Otogizōshi (Narumi Seto)
- Paka RUN (Nanae Chrono; art by Takamasa Nakabayashi)
- Paradox Blue (Tatsurō Nakanishi; art by Nini)
- Pavane for a Dead Girl (Koge-Donbo*) (ongoing)
- Peacemaker Kurogane (Nanae Chrono) (ongoing)
- Petals of Reincarnation (Mikihisa Konishi)
- Pontera (Sankaku Head)
- Princess Lucia (Kouji Seo)
- Psycho-Pass: Kanshikan Shinya Kogami (Midori Goto and Production I.G; art by Natsuo Sai)
- Psycho-Pass 2 (Saru Hoshino)
- Puchi-Hound (nekoneko) (from Comic Blade Masamune)
- R² [rise R to the second power] (Maki Hakoda)
- Rain (Takumi Yoshino; art by Megumi Sumikawa)
- Repeat After Me (Manabu Yamamoto)
- Robotics;Notes (5pb.; story by Keiji Asakawa)
- Rolling Girls (Yōsuke Miyagi; art by Bonkara)
- Ro~lling Gi~rls: Inspiration x Traveler (Yōsuke Miyagi; art by Sheepbox)
- Rui-Rui (Makutsu)
- Rurigaki Yoruko no Yuigon (Miki Miyashita)
- Saint October (Shogo Kumasaka; art by Kiira~☆)
- Sengoku Youko (Satoshi Mizukami)
- Shimoneta to Iu Gainen ga Sonzai Shinai Taikutsu na Sekai: Manmaruban (Hirotaka Akagi; art by Yuzuki N')
- Shindou Gekijou Get Wild (Daisuke Shindou)
- Shirayuki PaniMix! (Izumi Kirihara) (from Comic Blade Masamune)
- Shikigami×Shoujo (Hiroshi Kubota) (from Comic Blade Masamune)
- Sketchbook (Totan Kobako) (ongoing)
- Softenni (Ryo Azuchi)
- Sōkō Akki Muramasa: Makai-hen (Nitro+ and Midori Gotou; art by Ganjii)
- Sousei no Gaokerena (Noriaki Kawazu)
- SoniComi (Nitroplus, art by Imusanjo)
- Sorejaa Yoshida-kun! (Natsuki Yoshimura)
- Space Battleship Yamato 2199: Scarlet-Eyed Ace (Mayumi Azuma)
- Steins;Gate: Bōkan no Rebellion (Kenji Mizuta)
- Steins;Gate: Hiyoku Renri no Sweets Honey (Taishi Tsutsui)
- Stigmata (Ko Yasung)
- Suashi no Meteorite (Mikihisa Konishi)
- Sumikko no Sora-san (Kanoka Tana)
- Super Danganronpa 2: Nanami Chiaki no Sayonara Zetsubou Daibouken (Spike Chunsoft; art by Karin Suzuragi)
- Tabi to Michizure (Kanoka Tana)
- Takeru ~SUSANOH: Sword of the Devil~ (Kazuki Nakashima; art by Kemuri Karakara)
- Tales of Symphonia (Hitoshi Ichimura)
- Tengai Retrogical (Rin Asano) (ongoing)
- The First King Adventure (Moyamu Fujimo)
- The Innocent (Avi Arad and Junichi Fujisaku; art by Ko Yasung)
- The Mythical Detective Loki Ragnarok (Sakura Kinoshita)
- Sky Crawlers: Innocent Aces (Yuho Ueji)
- Tobe!! Luck Rock Girl (Tanba Niwa)
- Tokumu Kikoutai Kuchikura (Yoshiki Sakurai and Production I.G; art by Youichirou Hinata)
- Toraneko Folklore (Mayumi Azuma)
- Totsukuni no Shoujo (Nagabe)
- Tsubakiiro Ballad (Hamao Sumeragi)
- Tsubura na Wakusei (Naoya Kaneko)
- Uchi no Isourou ga Sekai o Shouakushite Iru! (Tsuyoshi Nanajou; art by I~tou~)
- Uchū Roshin Muumo (Munekichi)
- Umi Monogatari ~Anata ga Ite Kureta Koto~ (Akira Katsuragi)
- Urawa Holy Order (Kazuo Yamamoto)
- Vaizard (Michihiro Yoshida)
- W Change!! (Hiro Matsuba)
- Wan Pagu! (Ryo Mitsuya)
- Your and My Secret (Ai Morinaga)
- Zodiac Game (Shinjirou)
