= Mag Garden =

Japanese publishing company

Mag Garden Corporation
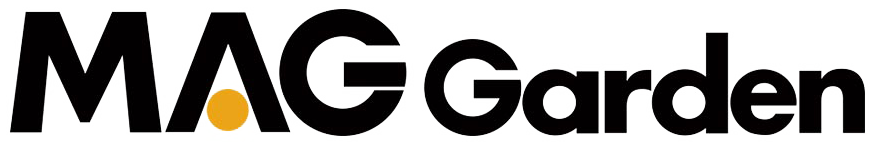
- Native name: 株式会社マッグガーデン
- Romanized name: Kabushiki-gaisha Maggu Gāden
- Type: Kabushiki gaisha
- Industry: Books, Magazines, Manga
- Founded: June 5, 2001; 25 years ago
- Founder: Yoshihiro Hosaka
- Headquarters: Chiyoda, Tokyo, Japan,
- Key people: Yoshihiro Hosaka (president and CEO)
- Parent: IG Port
- Website: mag-garden.co.jp

Mag Garden Corporation (マッグガーデン, Maggu Gāden) is a Japanese publishing company that focuses on manga-related publications and is also involved in the development of anime and live-action adaptations. It was founded on June 5, 2001, by Yoshihiro Hosaka along with former manga artists of Enix (now Square Enix). The company performed a merger with Production I.G on December 1, 2007, to form the new company IG Port, becoming one of IG Port's subsidiaries alongside Signal.MD and Wit Studio.

== History ==
Mag Garden was founded on June 5, 2001, by Yoshihiro Hosaka, who previously worked as an editor from Enix (now Square Enix) before leaving. It started out as a spin-out company from Enix's manga publishing division before the company merged with Square. The Square-Enix merger resulted in an uprising with some of the manga artist staff. Fearing their manga being dropped out of publication and tired of the harsh treatment, they left Square Enix to help create Mag Garden, where they would also continue serializing their series. The establishment of Mag Garden and the former manga artists' departure from Square Enix prompted legal disputes over copyright issues between the two companies. The legal battle was concluded in March 2003 and Square Enix agreed to contribute 50% of Mag Garden's capital. Manga that was once published under Enix from the former authors had to continue serialization under new titles. On September 22, 2003, Mag Garden became a separate, independent company and was admitted in the Tokyo Stock Exchange's "Mothers" market after Square Enix sold all of its remaining shares.

On July 4, 2007, the company announced a merger with Production I.G to form a new company called IG Port. Mag Garden has a steady relationship with Production I.G as they have both collaborated on such cross-media anime/manga projects like Ghost Hound and Sisters of Wellber. Previously, Production I.G was Mag Garden's #2 shareholder as they owned 15% of their stock. The merger was completed on December 1, 2007, in which Mag Garden has officially become a subsidiary of IG Port.

Among the manga artists who moved to Mag Garden were Kozue Amano, Rin Asano, Mayumi Azuma, Nanae Chrono, Moyamu Fujino, Maki Hakoda, Sakura Kinoshita, Satomi Kubo, Hiro Matsuba, Minene Sakurano, Kazusa Saitou, Kaili Sorano, Seiuchirou Todono, Sirou Tunasima, and Natsuki Yoshimura.

== Published magazines ==
Active

- Monthly Comic Avarus
- Monthly Comic Garden
- Eden
- Web Comic Beat's

Discontinued

- Comic Blade Masamune
- Comic Blade Brownie
- Comic Blade Gunz
- Comic Blade Zebel
- Monthly Comic Blade
