= List of Pita-Ten episodes =

The anime series Pita-Ten is based on the manga series of the same name by Koge-Donbo. The series is directed by Toshifumi Kawase and Yuzo Sato and produced by Madhouse. Nine DVDs were released by Bandai Visual in limited and regular editions between June 25, 2002, and April 25, 2003. The first DVD contained the first two episodes, and the other DVD volumes had three episodes each. Two pieces of theme music were used for the series: one opening theme and one ending theme.

The opening theme is "Wake Up Angel (Negaimashite wa (Mugen) Nari)" (Wake Up Angel 〜ねがいましては∞（無限）なり〜, lit. "Wake Up Angel: A Wish is Infinite") by Funta and the ending theme is "Chiisana Mahō" (ちいさなまほう, lit. "Little Magic") by Miyuki Sawashiro.

== Episode list ==
No.	Translated title Original Japanese title	Directed by	Written by	Original release date
1	"How To Get Along With an Angel"; Transliteration: "Tenshi to no Tsukiaikata" (Japanese: 天使とのつきあい方)	Yūzō Satō	Akemi Omode	April 7, 2002
Misha descends to earth and greets Kotarou. Kotarou freaks out at her greeting and runs away. After an ordinary school day, Kotarou finds Misha again, accidentally injuring her. He takes her in and explains to Misha about how he has to do most of the housework after his mother died. Misha, sad by the event, volunteers to be his new mother and follows him everywhere, causing numerous troubles.
2	"How To Make A Yummy Apple Pie"; Transliteration: "Oishii Appuru Pai no Tsukurikata" (Japanese: おいしいアップルパイの作り方)	Yoshiaki Okumura	Akemi Omode	April 14, 2002
Koboshi tries to win Kotarou back from Misha. Seeing gifts Takashi received from other girls as a sign of love, Koboshi bakes an apple pie for Kotarou. Koboshi finishes the pie but is hesitant to deliver it after hearing Kotarou's weariness from eating apples. Koboshi finally drops the apple pie at Kotarou after Misha volunteered to deliver the gift to him. Kotarou appreciates the pie, saying he has not tried cooked apples.
3	"How To Have Fun at 'Test Your Courage' Day"; Transliteration: "Kimodameshi no Tanoshimikata" (Japanese: きもだめしの楽しみ方)	Yūzō Yamada	Akemi Omode	April 21, 2002
Koboshi plans out a scary recreational event for "Test Your Courage Day". Kotarou, feared of ghosts, receives a charm from Misha in case he needs help. On the event day, Kotarou, not a participant of the event, sees ghosts flying around and runs away. He accidentally enters the haunted house and sees more scary visuals. Kotarou finally screams, causing the charm to activate and Misha to rescue him. Kotarou, Koboshi, and Takashi find out that Misha is an angel.
4	"How To Have Fun When Going Into an Onsen"; Transliteration: "Tanoshii Onsen no Hairikata" (Japanese: 楽しい温泉の入り方)	Asumi Matsumura	Yasuko Kobayashi	April 28, 2002
Misha wins hot spring tickets and invites everyone to come. Misha, misunderstanding Takashi's word about "cleaning your soul", forms a voodoo doll of Kotarou and washes it, making Kotarou unconscious. Shia attempts to practice demonic skills on Kotarou, but fails when Misha revives Kotarou. Learning the Shia lives alone, Misha invites her to join everyone else and to stay in her apartment.
5	"How To Look For A Part-Time Job"; Transliteration: "Arubaito no Sagashikata" (Japanese: アルバイトの探し方)	Kazuya Komai	Kazuyuki Fudeyasu	May 5, 2002
Shia tries hard to contribute in return for living in Misha's apartment. While Misha interferes with Kotarou at school, Shia looks for job. Unsuccessful, Takashi notes his uncle needing a replacement worker for his cafè called Tricot. At the cafè, Koboshi fights with Takashi and accidentally flips the sign to "Open", flooding the cafè with customers. With the help of others, Shia manages to serve everyone well during the rush.
6	"How To Make a New Friend"; Transliteration: "Atarashii Tomodachi no Mukaekata" (Japanese: 新しいともだちの迎え方)	Ryūichi Kimura	Hiroko Tokita	May 12, 2002
Hiroshi Mitarai, a rich boy, fights with Takashi about how he places above him in the National Mock Exams. Trying to compete with him in every subject, he becomes crazy about Misha when he almost kicked the ball at Kotarou. Using Misha as a prize, Hiroshi faces off with Takashi. Although Hiroshi trained hard and exits the test room with high confidence, Takashi still places above him on the National Mock Exam.
7	"How To Play Pranks"; Transliteration: "Itazura no Shikata" (Japanese: いたずらの仕方)	Hiroshi Matsuzono	Yuki Enatsu	May 19, 2002
Kaoru tries to make life miserable for Takashi in revenge for her brother. Mistaken Takashi for Kotarou, Kaoru attacks Kotarou, causing Misha to worry. Putting more pranks, she does not understand that Hiroshi is being held responsible for the pranks. Takashi eventually jumps out at her an identifies himself. Kaoru, crazy about Takashi, attacks Hiroshi instead for disrespect of Takashi.
8	"How To Fight Your Rival"; Transliteration: "Raibaru to no Tatakaikata" (Japanese: 対決の仕方)	Nobuo Tomisawa	Kenji Sugihara	May 26, 2002
Koboshi announces Princess Kaguya, the play they will put on for the school arts festival. Hiroshi competes with Takashi to win the main part but loses. Takashi accidentally hurts himself and hands the part to Kotarou even though Hiroshi argues that he is a better replacement. Kotarou has trouble memorizing the script and practices hard, losing his voice. Through Misha's encouragement, Kotarou finishes the play successfully.
9	"How to Catch an Angel"; Transliteration: "Tenshi no Mitsukekata" (Japanese: 天使の見つけ方)	Yūzō Yamada	Hiroko Tokita	June 2, 2002
Hiroshi dreams about Misha as an angel and tries to prove Kaoru in reality that Misha is an angel. Because of Misha's unawareness, Hiroshi gathers more evidence from her explanation of the "To Heaven" box and her flying outside. Kaoru, believing that everything is an illusion, tries to attack Misha for giving such illusion. Eventually, Takashi convinces Hiroshi that his present gives Misha powers to fly.
10	"How To Reconcile Skillfully"; Transliteration: "Jōzu na Nakanaori no Shikata" (Japanese: 上手な仲直りの仕方)	Shinji Satō	Yuki Enatsu	June 9, 2002
Misha breaks Kotarou's mother's cup which upsets him. Kotarou yells at Misha, causing her to be depressed. Misha tries to fix the broken cup using a glue she brought from heaven. However, Misha trips and squirts the glue on her friends. Kotarou, Koboshi, and Takashi all get stuck with unmatched pairs: Kotarou-Misha, Koboshi-Nyaa, and Takashi-Hiroshi. To break away from the glue, each pair must get along.
11	"How to Invite Someone to a Wonderful Dance"; Transliteration: "Suteki na Dansu no Sasoikata" (Japanese: 素敵なダンスの誘い方)	Yasuhito Mizobuchi	Kazuyuki Fudeyasu	June 16, 2002
Takashi's performance has dropped recently as he starts to be concerned about his feelings towards Shia. Karou tries to relieve Takashi with many Mitarai items, but nothing relieves Takashi. His friends give him a cheer up party, but Takashi still feels depressed. Takashi meets Shia in the park and asks her for a dance. He eventually cheers up receiving advice from Misha. Upon visiting Tricot, they find out that Shia is a demon.
12	"How to Collect Trifles"; Transliteration: "Garakuta no Atsumekata" (Japanese: ガラクタの集め方)	Takeo Takahashi; Jun Shishido	Yasuko Kobayashi	June 23, 2002
Takashi is troubled about Shia being a demon, spending hours researching about demons and figuring out consequences and dangers of being with a demon. When Kotarou and his friends went to collect junk for an assignment, Misha tries to help Kotarou secretly, creating more junk and causing trouble for the town. Takashi thinks that Shia is behind the whole situation, but learns that Misha is doing it instead.
13	"How To Walk Into A Castle"; Transliteration: "Oshiro no Arukikata" (Japanese: お城の歩き方)	Ryūichi Kimura	Hiroko Tokita	June 30, 2002
Kotarou and his friends go to Hiroshi's mansion to access resources for an assignment. Hiroshi, making Takashi unwelcome, forces all to study inside a jungle environment. Kotarou and Koboshi go and get more books but gets trapped inside Hiroshi's training room. Kotarou arrives in the Mitarai hall and Hiroshi explains his duty of being a Mitarai leader. Later that night, Kotarou learns that angels also have exams.
14	"How To Feel Happy"; Transliteration: "Shiawase no Kanjikata" (Japanese: しあわせの感じ方)	Keisuke Ōnishi	Hiroko Tokita	July 7, 2002
School exams are coming. Misha disrupts Kotarou to study for her exam, which is about happiness. Failing to succeed, Misha gives Kotarou a special pencil, believing that good grades make Kotarou happy. However, Kotarou gets scolded and has to retake the test. Shia presents Kotarou meat buns and encourages him to talk to Misha, who is studying on the roof. Kotarou and Misha help each other out. Takashi still places above Hiroshi in the results. Kotarou improves his placement.
15	"How To Play In The Amusement Park"; Transliteration: "Yūenchi no Asobikata" (Japanese: 遊園地のあそび方)	Keiichirō Furya	Yuki Enatsu	July 14, 2002
Shino, a troublesome cousin, visits Kotarou. Angry that her father has a business trip, Shino goes to the amusement park with Kotarou and his friends. Kotarou and his friends pass out being unable to handle Shino and Misha's tremendous energy. Hearing that Shino's father actually had to go to the hospital, Shino runs away. Without hope finding Shino, Misha flies up into the air with Kotarou and finds Shino, crying to go to the hospital. Misha transports Shino to the hospital.
16	"How To Walk like a girl." Transliteration: "Gekai no Arukikata" (Japanese: 下界の歩き方)	Keiichirō Furya	Hiroko Tokita	July 21, 2002
Sasha, Misha's sister, visits Earth to observe Misha. Sasha is horrified to see Misha living with a demon in her apartment. After repeatedly fighting with Nyaa about whose apprentice is better, Sasha accidentally casts her spell on Kotarou, causing him to excel the next day. As a demon, Nyaa tries to cast an opposite spell. Fighting between evil and good over Kotarou and his friends, the spells cancel out, leaving them with a draw.
17	"How To Enjoy Your Holiday"; Transliteration: "Kyūjitsu no Tanoshimikata" (Japanese: 休日の楽しみ方)	Yukio Okazaki	Yuki Enatsu	July 28, 2002
Takashi's uncle gives Takashi movie tickets for their hard work. Takashi and Shia choose a romance movie while Kotarou and Koboshi follow Misha to a dinosaur movie. Nyaa, trying to give practice to Shia, possesses Kaoru, causing her to destroy the romance movie screen. Misha, Koboshi, and Kotarou arrive late to find Kaoru chasing all of them to the park. Shia tries to confront her but fails. Hiroshi receives a tool that will cure Kaoru.
18	"How To Spend Your Vacation"; Transliteration: "Bakansu no Sugoshikata" (Japanese: バカンスのすごし方)	Asumi Matsumura	Kazuyuki Fudeyasu	August 4, 2002
Kaoru invites Takashi to Mitarai's family beach resort but reluctantly accepts all his friends at Takashi's request. At the beach, Hiroshi wears a flotation device and refuses to enter the sea water. Kaoru explains that Hiroshi was chased by a whale, giving him the fear of swimming. Misha uses her spell to give Hiroshi swimming lessons in the sea water. They end the vacation with fireworks.
19	"How An Apprentice Angel Does Her Best"; Transliteration: "Minarai Tenshi no Ganbarikata" (Japanese: 見習い天使のがんばり方)	Keiichirō Furya	Yasuko Kobayashi	August 11, 2002
Today is Misha's angel qualification exam. Her task is to become an Angel-For-One-Day and is examined by Sasha to see if she qualifies as an angel. Misha makes numerous mistakes, resulting in numerous deductions. Sasha then finds Nyaa trying to disrupt Misha's exam and fights with Nyaa. Misha's mistakes start a large tomato fight, joined by Takashi, Koboshi, and Hiroshi. Kotarou shouts out, causing Misha to hug Kotarou and end the fight.
20	"How To Find Things You've Lost"; Transliteration: "Nakushita Mono no Mitsukekata" (Japanese: なくしたものの見つけ方)	Gō Masui	Kenji Sugihara	August 18, 2002
Misha suddenly disappears. Kotarou starts happy as Misha will stop distracting him, but turns sad. Koboshi and Takashi try to find her without success. Hiroshi also participates but is thwarted by Kaoru. After a week when Kotarou almost gives up, Misha returns from heaven after registering for another angel exam. Misha does not know time passes slower in heaven. Kotarou feels relieved about the current situation.
21	"How Girls Do Their Best"; Transliteration: "Onna no Ko no Ganbarikata" (Japanese: 女の子のがんばり方)	Keiichirō Furya	Hiroko Tokita	August 25, 2002
Koboshi feels left out because Kotarou has feelings for Misha. Shia and Misha also live next to him and have many qualities and skills. Koboshi volunteers to do Kotarou's housework, but fails. Hearing Takashi and Kotarou explain about her ungirly past, Koboshi tries to change her personality to become more pretty and less violent. Koboshi goes overboard and passes out from hunger. Kotarou explains that he likes Koboshi acting normally.
22	"How To Burn For The Sports Meeting"; Transliteration: "Undōkai no Moekata" (Japanese: 運動会の燃え方)	Masahiko Ohta	Kazuyuki Fudeyasu; Yasuko Kobayashi	September 1, 2002
Kotarou and the others compete in the town's annual sports meeting to win an automatic dishwasher for Shia in response to Misha breaking her favorite bowl. However, Shia struggles when she runs. Hiroshi also enlists in the sports meeting to rival Takashi while Kaoru enlists as a chance for her to express her love at Takashi. During the main event, a surprise former champion approaches one of the lanes.
23	"How To Enjoy Hiking"; Transliteration: "Haikingu no Tanoshimikata" (Japanese: ハイキングの楽しみ方)	Kō Matsuo	Kenji Sugihara; Yasuko Kobayashi	September 8, 2002
Kotarou and the others are going on a hiking trip. At the bus station, Takashi overreacts about his favorite lunch box from Shia. Kotarou knocks it over by accident, separating Takashi and Kotarou. Misha and Koboshi try to fake a drowning incident, but Hiroshi interferes. As the weather gets harsher, Kotarou tries to return to the bus station alone but slips. Takashi saves Kotarou and they both reconcile their friendship.
24	"How To Visit A Patient"; Transliteration: "Omimai no Ikikata" (Japanese: お見舞いの行き方)	Yukio Okazaki	Yuki Enatsu	September 15, 2002
Takashi is hospitalized and Kotarou and his friends visit him. Miku, another patient, unsuccessfully tries to escape her injection. Shia draws on Miku's bandage to help relieve her pain. The next day, other kids started asking Shia to draw pictures on their casts and bandages as well. Misha brings in cookies that grants them their wish. Transforming the hospital to a happier place, Shia faces a surprising announcement from Nyaa.
25	"How To Separate"; Transliteration: "Owakare no Shikata" (Japanese: お別れの仕方)	Osamu Sekita	Hiroko Tokita	September 22, 2002
Shia gets fired as a demon apprentice. Nyaa convinces her to revert to doing demonic activity, but Shia decides against it and vanishes. Everyone forgets about Shia except for Misha. Kotarou does not understand Misha's sad feelings until Misha forces memories of Shia back into Kotarou's mind. Shia's vanish also helped Misha pass part of her final angel exam; the second part is to make sure the demon never returns.
26	"How To Connect Your Feelings"; Transliteration: "Omoi no Tsunagikata" (Japanese: 想いのつなぎ方)	Yūzō Satō	Yasuko Kobayashi	September 29, 2002
Misha tries to make everyone remember Shia and bring her back. Misha uses an item from heaven, but it backfires, making everyone but Kotarou forget about Misha. Misha tries it again, but is warned by her sister, Sasha, that this violates the conduct of angels. Misha resumes anyway and revives Shia. As a consequence, Misha gets fired and vanishes from existence. Two weeks later, Sasha rethinks about what Misha did and she comes back. Everyone is happy thus ending the story and series.

== Media release ==
Bandai Visual (Japan, Region 2)
Volume	Episodes	VHS release date	DVD release date
Volume 1	1-2	June 25, 2002	June 25, 2002
Volume 2	3-5	July 25, 2002	July 25, 2002
Volume 3	6-8	August 25, 2002	August 25, 2002
Volume 4	9-11	September 25, 2002	September 25, 2002
Volume 5	12-14	October 25, 2002	October 25, 2002
Volume 6	15-17	November 25, 2002	November 25, 2002
Volume 7	18-20	January 25, 2002	January 25, 2002
Volume 8	21-23	March 25, 2002	March 25, 2002
Volume 9	24-26	April 25, 2002	April 25, 2002
Box	1-26	None	December 22, 2011
