= Eden (magazine) =

Online manga magazine

WEB Comic EDEN
- Available in: Japanese
- Owner: Mag Garden
- Website: http://comic.mag-garden.co.jp/eden/
- Registration: Optional
- Launched: September 18, 2009
- Current status: Active

Web Comic EDEN (ウェブコミックエデン, Uebu Komikku Eden) is a free manga and light novel web magazine published by Mag Garden and formerly distributed by Yahoo! Comics Japan (Now MAGCOMI). It was launched on September 18, 2009, under the name EDEN & Blade Comic Archive (EDEN&ブレイドコミックアーカイブ, EDEN & Bureido Komikku Aakaibu), about a year after on October 8, 2010, the name was changed to EDEN. EDEN (short for Everybody Delightful Entertainment Network) distributes original manga and light novel content, while Blade Comic Archive redistributes selected works published from Monthly Comic Blade to be viewed online for a limited time. The development of the web magazine also led Mag Garden to collaborate on a joint project with Toei Animation.

Currently it is distributed on Mag Gardens free manga site called MAGCOMI, and functions as a label.

== Serialized media ==
=== Manga ===
- Ashi Tsuma Monogatari (Julie Okamoto)
- Captain Yamada (Kenji Sonishi)
- Cha no Namida ~Larmes de the'~ (Kaeru Minamo)
- Chiku-Chiku Nui-Nui (Yamato Hazaki)
- Domino (Note Tono)
- Dounimo Kounimo (Naoko Kusaka)
- Fukinshin-chan (Yuu Nagashima)
- Gokuraku Nagaya (Tetuzoh Okadaya)
- Jockey (Takeshi Matsuki; art by Yoshimi Kurata)
- High-Leg Panda (UrumaDelvi, Kanko Amanatsu)
- Hon no Koi Nado (Koma Kawakami)
- Irochigai (Izumi Okaya)
- Kanbi Danshi (Yū Shimizu)
- Kētai Sōsakan 7 ~rare metal hearts~ Sonna Anata ga Suki Dakara (Miyako Tachikawa)
- Ketsu-Inu (LifeStyleTSUNODA)
- Kikumon Koukou Mote Bu (Zecchou)
- Kinakomochi (Iko Kimura)
- Kohi Ikaga Deshou (Misato Konari)
- Mayple-san no Koucha Jikan (Kuuta Aoi)
- Metro (Chika Ishikawa)
- Mousou no Aki (Tarako)
- Musunde Hiraite (Mayu Minase)
- Nantoka Yattemasu. (LifeStyleTSUNODA)
- Neko Ramen Monogatari: Koneko no Thomas (Kenji Sonishi)
- Nigakute Amai (Yumio Kobayashi)
- Nōgyō Musume! (Minori Kagura)
- Nōgyō Musume! ~Ibuki no Farmer's Life~ (Tooru Makari)
- One Off (Junichi Sato, art by Mahito Ōta)
- Remake (Ikumi Rotta)
- Shin Bukatsudou (Rie Nishida)
- Suki Mameshi (Izumi Okaya)
- Tamayura (Junichi Sato; art by momo)
- Tamayura: Hitotose (Junichi Sato; art by momo)
- Taranome Koukou Suisou Gaku-Bu (Seiji Takanashi)
- Tokyo Yoga Girls (Reinina)
- Tsubakisou 101 Goushitsu (Yūko Uramoto)
- Uchi to Okan. (Yu Yabuuchi)
- Yome-san wa Moe Mangaka (Koge-Donbo*)
- "Production I.G×Mag Garden" Comic Award
  - Japanese Family (Fumitake Shiraishi)
  - Rojiura Neon (Yumio Kobayashi)
  - Kuon no Higashi (Masatoru Yokoya)

=== Light Novels ===
- Akuma no Fukuin (Shion Asakawa)
- Kyouka no Youkai Senki (Goru Koganei)
- Meidonoana: Hagoromo wa Kaeri Kitariki! (Miruka Sakamoto)

== Blade Comic Archive ==
- Elemental Gelade (Mayumi Azuma)
- Naki Shōjo no Tame no Pavane (Koge-Donbo)
- The Mythical Detective Loki (Sakura Kinoshita)
- Shinsengumi Imon Peacemaker (Nanae Chrono)

== See also ==
- pixiv
- Web Comic
- Monthly Comic Blade
- Monthly Comic Avarus
