= Marble (band) =

- Origin: Japan
- Genres: Pop
- Years active: 1999–present
- Labels: Warner Music Group (1999–2003, as The STUDENT'S), Lantis (2007–present)

marble is a Japanese musical duo, originally named The Student's and formed in 1999. The members, Micco and Tatsuya Kikuchi, met and became friends while they were both enrolled in music school. Kikuchi was the main musical support for Micco at that time, who was acting as a solo artist. As they got to know each other better, they decided that they could both make better music if they performed together, and formed The Student's. After getting signed to Warner Music Group's indie label in 1999, they had two releases, but got increasingly more involved in production for other artists and gradually did less and less of their own activities. However, the urge to write and perform their own music came back, and to commemorate this change in attitude, they resigned from the company and renamed themselves 'marble' in 2003 and played shows with a backup band, but they split from the band in 2005, and Micco and Kikuchi continued their performances as a duo.

Since their major debut in 2007 with Lantis, they have had a number of releases, including their first album in February 2008. Their songs have been featured in such anime as Hidamari Sketch, Kamichama Karin, KimiKiss pure rouge and Tamayura ~hitotose~.

Their sound is described as calm and soothing "organic pop", most likely because they use very few synthesized instruments and the main instrument is an acoustic guitar.

== Members ==
- Micco (みっこ, Mikko; born February 8) – vocals, lyrics, and occasional composition.
- Tatsuya Kikuchi (菊池 達也, Kikuchi Tatsuya; born October 13) – acoustic guitar, bass guitar, composition and arrangement.

== Discography ==
=== Singles ===
- deep breath (released 2003) – limited pressing, 100 copies.
1. Chikyū (地球, lit. the Earth)
2. Paper Plane
3. Durari (ドゥラリ)
4. Yurikago (ゆりかご, lit. Cradle) (acoustic version)
5. Tenohira (てのひら, lit. Palm of the Hand) (acoustic version)
- Free CD (released 2003) – only 50 copies exist. It was handed out at a gig.
1. frail
2. Toki o Koete (時を越えて, lit. Time is Passing By)
- Is it over? (released 2005)
1. Is it over?
2. Ajisai-iro no Heya (紫陽花色の部屋, lit. Hydrangea Colored Room)
3. Kioku wa Umi no Soko no Shiro (記憶は海の底の城, lit. Memories of the Castle at the Bottom of the Sea)
- Christmas Gentei Free CD (released 2005.12.24) – handed out only at their gig at Yotsuya Tenmado on Christmas Eve, 2005.
1. Rin (凛, lit. Cold)
2. Early Christmas Morning – Cyndi Lauper cover
- Senritsu no Kanata (旋律の彼方, lit. Beyond the Melody) (released 2005)
1. Senritsu no Kanata (旋律の彼方, lit. Beyond the Melody)
2. Wind Thread on a Spool
3. Kazane (風音, lit. Sound of the Wind)
- Rin (凛, lit. Cold) (released 2006 summer)
1. Rin (凛, lit. Cold)
2. Ao no Tobira (青の扉, lit. Blue Door)
3. I'm free
- Mebae Drive (芽生えドライブ, Mebae Doraibu; lit. Sprouting Drive) (released 2007.2.21) – ending theme of Hidamari Sketch
1. Mebae Drive (芽生えドライブ, lit. Sprouting Drive)
2. Rin (凛, lit. Cold)
3. Mebae Drive (instrumental)
4. Rin (instrumental)
- Kūchū Meiro (空中迷路, lit. The Sky Labyrinth) (released 2007.7.25) – second ending theme of Kamichama Karin
1. Kūchū Meiro (空中迷路, lit. The Sky Labyrinth)
2. Rain Drop
3. Hoshizora (星空, lit. Starry Sky)
4. Kūchū Meiro (instrumental)
- Aozora loop (青空loop, lit. Blue Sky loop) (released 2007.10.24) – opening theme of KimiKiss pure rouge
1. Aozora loop (青空loop, lit. Blue Sky loop)
2. clover
3. Aozora loop (instrumental)
4. clover (instrumental)
- Ryūsei Record (流星レコード, Ryūsei Rekōdo; lit. Shooting Star Record) (released 2008.8.6) – ending theme of Hidamari Sketch × 365
1. Ryūsei Record (流星レコード, Ryūsei Rekōdo; lit. Shooting Star Record)
2. Hummingbird (ハミングバード, Hamingubādo)
3. Ryūsei Record (instrumental)
4. Hummingbird (instrumental)
- Suisai candy – Mashiro-Iro Symphony ~Love Is Pure White~

=== Albums ===
- Niji-iro Humming (虹色ハミング, Niji-iro Hamingu; lit. Rainbow Colored Humming) (released 2008.2.6)
1. Anemone: Melancholy of marble Version (アネモネ～Melancholy of marble Version～, Anemone ~Melancholy of marble Version~)
2. Kūchū Meiro (空中迷路, lit. Sky Labyrinth)
3. Aozora loop (青空loop, lit Blue Sky loop)
4. Kimi to Slow (君とスロー, lit. You and Slow)
5. Move
6. Ao no Tobira: Album Version (青の扉 ～Album Version～, lit. Blue Door ~Album Version~)
7. Niji-iro Humming (虹色ハミング, Niji-iro Hamingu; lit. Rainbow Colored Humming)
8. Watabōshi (綿帽子, lit. Bride's Headdress)
9. Hodoita Te (ほどいた手, lit. Unheld Hand)
10. Saigo wa Shiro ni Naru. (最後は白になる。, lit. It's White in the End.)
11. Hoshizora featuring Lil': Train to Stella mix (星空 featuring Lil' ～Train to Stella Mix～, lit. Star Sky featuring Lil' ~Train to Stella Mix~)
12. Tsubomi (蕾, lit. Plant Bud)
13. Clover: Ble Nova version (クローバー ～Ble Nova Version～, Kurōbā ~Ble Nova Version)
14. Mebae Drive (芽生えドライブ, Mebae Doraibu; lit Sprouting Drive)
- Senritsu no Yukue, Sora no Kanata (旋律の行方、空の彼方, lit. Melodies Beyond the Sky) (released 2008.10.15) – This is their first entirely acoustic album, released exclusively on iTunes Japan. It includes previously unreleased songs.
- Tenohira (手のひら, lit. Palm of the Hand) (released 2009.1.21) – this is a selection of their earlier indie works, many of which are otherwise no longer available.

=== Collaborations ===
- Nana Kitade's song "Shunkan" (瞬間, lit. Moment) was originally created by marble and named "Tenohira (てのひら)".
- mona records / Subarashiki Jishu Seisaku no Sekai Vol.4 (released 2006)
  8. Rin (凛)
- Mai Nakahara's songs "Anemone" (アネモネ), "Sazanami no Koe" (漣の声, lit. Voice of Ripples), "Hikari no accord" (光のaccord, lit. The Light Accord), "Aera no Kaze" (アエラの風), "Merry-go-round", and "Twinkle"
- Ryōko Hirosue's song "Kajitsu" (果実, Fruit)
