= Comi Digi + =

Japanese manga magazine

- Cover of the first issue
- Categories: Seinen manga
- Frequency: Bimonthly
- Publisher: Flex Comix
- First issue: April 2003
- Final issue: August 21, 2008
- Country: Japan
- Language: Japanese
- Website: Comi Digi +

Bimonthly Comi Digi (隔月コミデジ+, Kakugetsu Komi Deji +; read as Bimonthly Comi Digi Plus) was a Japanese seinen manga magazine edited by Broccoli, published by Flex Comix, and sold through Soft Bank Creative. The magazine is sold bimonthly on even-numbered months on the twenty-first. The magazine was originally published in April 2003 under the title Quarterly Di Gi Charat (季刊デ・ジ・キャラット, Kikan De Ji Kyaratto), after the series Di Gi Charat published by Broccoli Books. The magazine was suspended in July 2004, but restarted publication in October 2004 under the new title Comic Di Gi Charat (コミック デ・ジ・キャラット, Komikku De Ji Kyaratto) and was sold bimonthly as a special edition version of Comic Rush. The title was changed again in October 2005 to simply Comi Digi (コミデジ, Komi Deji), and lasted for two issues until the title was changed a final time to the current Comi Digi + on April 21, 2006. The final issue was released 21 August 2008.

Despite being targeted toward seinen audiences, it is composed of girly manga.

== Serialized titles ==
- Chitose ga Iku!
- Chitose Meshi Mase
- Clannad
- Gema Gema Gekijō Di Gi Charat
- Ekorōgu 46
- Emiru Miracle
- Fushigi no Kuni no Mint-chan
- Galaxy Angel
- Galaxy Angel 3rd
- GGBG!
- Gokukō Kōshinkyoku
- Hokke Mirin no Hi
- Idol Tantei Akari
- Kamichama Karin +
- Koi Cupid
- Kon Kon Kokon
- Majiponi!
- Mimitsuki G.A. Double Neko Maid
- Miracle Twin Star
- Piyo Piyo Piyoko-chan
- Princess Concerto
- True Tears
- Yoki Koto Kiku
