= Kon Kon Kokon =

Japanese manga series

- Japanese cover of Kon Kon Kokon, showing Kokon.

こんこんここん
- Genre: Mythic fiction, Supernatural, Romance
- Manga
- Written by: Koge-Donbo
- Published by: Broccoli Books
- Magazine: Comi Digi +
- Original run: December 2006 – September 2007?
- Volumes: 1

Kon Kon Kokon (こんこんここん; "Yelping Kokon") is a Japanese manga series written and illustrated by Koge-Donbo. The plot centers around a boy named Ren, who just wants to be popular in school but is secretly a nerdy monster fanatic. One day a young girl named Kokon shows up. She claims to be a fox that he had helped years ago, and now she wants to return the favor. The manga was serialized in Broccoli Books's magazine, Comi Digi + and was later compiled into a single volume. In North America, the manga was released by Broccoli Books USA. This series remains unfinished as both Comi Digi +, and Broccoli Books USA have since become defunct. The single English language manga volume has since received positive reviews.

== Plot ==
The series starts with Ren in school, getting high grades, and wishing Himeka would notice him. However, this is all interrupted when Kokon comes in and jumps on Ren, saying that she "has come to repay him". At first, Ren is indifferent towards Konkon, but that quickly changes when after Himeka asks Ren to explore the school with her because she had heard about an obake while exploring he discovers that Konkon is actually a Kyubi-no-Kitsune, a nine-tailed fox, something he hides from Himeka.

Later, Kitsuneko, another fox demon from the same clan as Kokon, makes a similar appearance as Kokon first did. She demands that Ren let Kokon go with her. Ren refuses, and Kitsuneko challenges Ren to a contest for Kokon to stay or not, which Ren wins when Kokon saves him. During the contest, Ren finds out that Kokon is a god of the fox clan called a "Miko" which is chosen by one of the other fox yokai. Kitsuneko also develops a crush on Ren and ends up staying with Konkon and Ren.

During a swimming contest, Kitsuneko gets jealous at seeing Himeka together with Ren and shoots at Himeka. She ends up hitting an umibōzu instead. Kokon then sees that it is an Ocean Miko. She also realizes that it is sad, something that Ren fixes by pulling its power source out of black goop. The umibōzu, who looks a bit like Himeka, later pays a visit to Ren at his house while saying that she needs to pay him back for his kindness, something that does not go well with Kokon. From Umibozu's payback promise to Kitsuneko's flirting with Ren, she becomes sad and determined to get Ren's attention back. She does that by accident by blowing up food in the kitchen and getting herself covered in it. Ren, pleased that Kokon is acting more like a yokai than a foxgirl, is happy, but Kokon is not, saying she "became human in order to be his wife".

== Characters ==
Kitsuneko and Kokon from Kon Kon Kokon

Ren Hinonishi (日野西 蓮, Hinonishi Ren) - Ren is a country bumpkin who recreates himself as a smart and cool guy in Tokyo so as not to reveal his secret, which is that he is a Japanese demon otaku.

Kokon (ここん, Kokon)- Kokon is a fox-demon girl who comes to Tokyo to repay her debt to Ren, a boy who saved her life. At the ending of the first volume, she claims that she became human in order to be his wife.

Kitsuneko (きつね子, Kitsuneko) - Kitsuneko is a fox-demon girl from the same fox-demon clan as Kokon. She appears to take Kokon back to her clan and challenges Ren to a race to find a charm. But after meeting Ren, she gains a new agenda: staying as close to Ren as possible.

Himeka Kujou (九条 姫香, Kujō Himeka) - Himeka is Ren's classmate and Kazune's cousin. Because she is Ren's crush, he is always trying to act cool in front of her. She is also a main character in Koge-Donbo's Kamichama Karin and a minor character in Koge-Donbo's Kamichama Karin Chu.

Kazune Kujou (九条 和音, Kujō Kazune) - Kazune is Ren's classmate who is smart, good-looking, popular with girls, and cool. He is also a main character in Koge-Donbo's Kamichama Karin/Kamichama Karin Chu series.

Umibozu (海坊主, Umi-bōzu) - Umibozu is an ocean-dwelling demon. During a trip to the beach, Ren helps her, and she soon chases after him with a desire to repay him for what he did. It is later discovered that Umibozu is actually male.

== Manga ==
Only a single manga book has ever been released for this series which was later translated into English and released in North America. The series was originally compiled in the manga magazine Comi Digi + sometime in 2006 before the first and only volume was released in Japan on December 21, 2006. In North America, Broccoli Books USA released an English version on June 13, 2007. Sometime in September 2007, the official Japanese page for Kon Kon Kokon was shut down. The last issue of Comi Digi + came out on August 21, 2008, before it became defunct, and Broccoli Books USA went under in December 2008. There is no information given through reliable sources if there will be a second volume, which leaves the series unfinished.

== Reception ==
The English language adaptation of Kon Kon Kokon received positive reviews from those in the field. Mania.com's Ariadne Roberts commended the manga for its "delicately textured and soft to the touch" cover as well as its "reprinted with exquisite clarity" "black & white pages". In a review by Carlo Santos from Anime News Network, he said that the artwork "may be Koge Donbo's best yet", but called the storyline "candypop fluff" when it comes to depth. Santos concluded by stating "Not the most fulfilling story, but the extensive use of folklore, the quick humor, and the energetic art lift it up to a B+."
