= 35S =

35S or 35-S may refer to:

- Wasco State Airport (FAA identifier: 35S), an airport in Sherman County, Oregon, U.S.
- 35th parallel south, a geographical latitude
- Rollei 35 S, a 35 mm camera
- Sulfur-35 (^{35}S), the most stable radioactive isotope of sulfur, used in biochemical research to radioactively label proteins
- HP 35s, a scientific calculator
- the 35S promoter from the cauliflower mosaic virus, used for constitutive expression in plants

== See also ==
- S35 (disambiguation)
