= Pavane for a Dead Girl =

Japanese manga series

- Cover of the first volume of the English release

亡き少女の為のパヴァーヌ (Naki Shōjo no Tame no Pavāne)
- Genre: Romantic fantasy
- Manga
- Written by: Koge-Donbo
- Published by: Mag Garden
- English publisher: NA: Tokyopop
- Magazine: Monthly Comic Blade
- Original run: July 30, 2008 – present
- Volumes: 7

Pavane for a Dead Girl (Japanese: 亡き少女の為のパヴァーヌ, Hepburn: Naki Shōjo no Tame no Pavāne) is a Japanese manga series written and illustrated by Koge-Donbo. The manga began serialization in Mag Garden's magazine Monthly Comic Blade in July 2008. As of May 2011, seven volumes have been released.

== Plot ==
Takenomaru Sagami is a violinist prodigy with a contract to fulfill. When he was 11 years old, Takenomaru contracted smallpox and became critically ill. Constantly feeling unwanted and hated throughout his life, he looked towards death as an escape. In his weak condition, he discovered hope in life from world-famous violinist and soldier Lieutenant Sagami, who encouraged him to learn the violin once he recovered from his illness. He told him music had nothing to do with race, which Takenomaru was used to seeing criticism for because of his foreign blood. Not long after finding his hope and purpose, Takenomaru stood before the entrance of death and made a contract with "an angel" in order to continue living. In exchange for being allowed to live and two other certain gifts he must sacrifice others by collecting the twelve Tears of Maria. Out of his resentment for the world, he agrees readily. Seven years later, at the music school where his foster father (Sagami) teaches, he pursues twelve girls to attain the jewels that represent each girl's feelings for him. He gives them each a brooch that changes color by the intensity feelings they have for him. Once they fall in love with him, the girls must face their death in order for Takenomaru to collect the Tear of Maria hidden in the girls' hearts.

== Characters ==
Takenomaru Sagami
He is 18 years old and adopted by Mr. Sagami. He is also a master of the violin (a "prodigy"). When he was younger, he was bullied and mistreated because of his "white man's blood" by the town's children and adults, even by the old man who took him in after his father and then mother abandoned him. When he was at the verge of dying, he made a pact with an "angel" and gained his lifeforce back, as well as two gifts, those of musical talent and good looks (the latter ridding him of potential pockmarks from his deadly case of smallpox); but as part of the contract he must attain the twelve Tears of Maria.He resembles Kazune and Suzune Kujyou from Kamichama Karin.
Mr. Sagami
The adoptive father of Takenomaru, he is skeptical of his activities. His relationship with Takenomaru is complicated. He lost his left hand in the war and his wife also died, so he holds high expectation of "Take" (as he calls Takenomaru) to become a great violinist and make him proud.
Nakae Wakabayashi
Childhood friend of Takenomaru who protected him and was his only companion. She came from their hometown to live and work in the city. She ends up working at Takenomaru's and Mr. Sagami's house as a maid. Even after seven years, when they reconnect, Nakae still calls Takenomaru by the childish nickname "Take-chan" and acts as if she was his older sister.
Nanao Kaga
A naive girl who, against her father's wishes and future arranged marriage, joins the music school in pursuit of Takenomaru, whom she once heard playing the violin and ended up moved by his performance. In the beginning, she calls him "Takenomaru-sama," but changes it to "Takenomaru-san" after she finds out he is younger than her (putting her anywhere between 19 and 21 years of age). She is the first to fall in love with him and is then stabbed by Takenomaru in a church building so that he may gather the first Tear of Maria from her.
Misaki Kanda
A young girl who becomes friends with Nanao after they met and thinks of her even after her death, although she and a few others assume it is either a "disappearance" or a transference.
Rumoi Matsumae
A young girl who is blind in one eye and extremely smart, considered a genius. Because of her intelligence, she is allowed to be at the school as an exception for someone of her young age. She carries a pink bunny doll.
Chigusa Nakamura
A quiet, mysterious and mature student who likes archery. She seems to know something about what is going on with Takenomaru and the Tears of Maria.
Hikari Hagi
This spunky girl holds great admiration for Takenomaru. In volume three, she and Takenomaru go on a date which eventually leads to them sleeping together. Then, the day after they get in a fight and Hikari commits suicide.
Mine Shimabara
Twin sister of Miwa and her polar opposite, she dislikes the idea of having a male student in the all-girls music school. She becomes Takenomaru's second Maria and victim, suffering the same fate as Nanao.

== Production ==
The series' title is derived from the piano piece Pavane pour une infante défunte by Maurice Ravel.

== Publication ==
Written and illustrated by Koge-Donbo, the series began serialization in Mag Garden's Monthly Comic Blade magazine on July 30, 2008. As of May 2011, the series' individual chapters have been collected into seven tankōbon volumes.

At San Diego Comic-Con 2010, Tokyopop announced that they licensed the series for English publication.

== Reception ==
Snow Wildsmith of ICv2 rated the first volume one out of five stars. Her main complaint was the jarring discrepancy between the dark story and the cute style of both the art and dialogue. Carlo Santos of Anime News Network praised the attention to detail in the drawing of violins. He also felt the story was "emotionally gripping".
