= Tamayura =

Japanese anime series

- Cover of the first manga volume featuring (clockwise from bottom right) Fū, Kaoru, Maon, and Norie.

たまゆら
- Genre: Iyashikei
- Created by: Junichi Sato
- Manga
- Written by: Junichi Sato
- Illustrated by: Momo
- Published by: Mag Garden
- Magazine: Eden
- Original run: October 8, 2010 – March 11, 2011
- Volumes: 1
- Original video animation
- Directed by: Junichi Sato
- Produced by: Asuka Yamazaki; Hidemasa Tasaka; Kentarō Kai; Masao Itō; Shigehiro Kurita
- Written by: Junichi Sato
- Music by: Nobuyuki Nakajima
- Studio: Hal Film Maker
- Licensed by: NA: Nozomi Entertainment
- Released: November 26, 2010 – December 23, 2010
- Runtime: 15–20 minutes
- Episodes: 4
- Anime television series

Tamayura: Hitotose
- Directed by: Junichi Sato; Assistant director: Takahiro Natori
- Produced by: Asuka Yamazaki; Hidemasa Tasaka; Kentarō Kai; Masao Itō; Shigehiro Kurita; Kōji Sone
- Written by: Junichi Sato
- Music by: Nobuyuki Nakajima
- Studio: TYO Animations
- Licensed by: NA: Nozomi Entertainment
- Original network: AT-X
- Original run: October 3, 2011 – December 19, 2011
- Episodes: 12 + OVA
- Manga

Tamayura: Hitotose
- Written by: Junichi Sato
- Illustrated by: Momo
- Published by: Mag Garden
- Magazine: Eden
- Original run: October 5, 2011 – January 20, 2013
- Volumes: 3
- Anime television series

Tamayura: More Aggressive
- Directed by: Junichi Sato; Assistant director: Takahiro Natori
- Produced by: Asuka Yamazaki; Hidemasa Tasaka; Kentarō Kai; Masao Itō; Shigehiro Kurita; Kōji Sone
- Written by: Junichi Sato
- Music by: Nobuyuki Nakajima
- Studio: TYO Animations
- Original network: AT-X, Tokyo MX, TV Aichi, NHK Hiroshma, tvk, SUN-TV, TVQ
- Original run: July 3, 2013 – September 18, 2013
- Episodes: 12 + OVA
- Anime film series

Tamayura ~Sotsugyō Shashin~
- Directed by: Junichi Sato; Assistant director: Takahiro Natori
- Produced by: Asuka Yamazaki; Hidemasa Tasaka; Kentarō Kai; Masao Itō; Kōji Sone; Tsutomu Yanagimura; Takuya Yamagata (Part 1); Akira Kubota (Part 2); Etsuhiko Taketomi (Parts 3 and 4)
- Written by: Junichi Sato
- Music by: Nobuyuki Nakajima
- Studio: TYO Animations
- Released: April 4, 2015 (Part 1); August 29, 2015 (Part 2); November 28, 2015 (Part 3); April 2, 2016 (Part 4)
- Runtime: 51–57 minutes
- Films: 4

Tamayura (たまゆら) is a Japanese anime series written and directed by Junichi Sato. The initial four-episode original video animation (OVA) series was produced by Hal Film Maker and released over two Blu-ray Disc and DVD volumes in November and December 2010. A 12-episode anime television series produced by TYO Animations, titled Tamayura: Hitotose, aired in Japan between October and December 2011. A second TV anime season, Tamayura: More Aggressive, aired between July and September 2013. A four-part animated film series, Tamayura: Sotsugyō Shashin, was released between April 4, 2015, and April 6, 2016. Two manga adaptations illustrated by Momo have been published by Mag Garden.

== Plot ==
Tamayura centers around a young girl named Fū Sawatari who moves to Takehara, Hiroshima to begin her first year of high school. Her late father grew up in Takehara and this is her first time back in the town in five years. Fū enjoys photography and is often engrossed with taking pictures with her father's old Rollei 35 S film camera. A shy girl, Fū tries her best to make friends early on, spurred on by her childhood friend Kaoru Hanawa. She quickly becomes friends with two other girls, Maon Sakurada and Norie Okazaki. After a year has passed, Fū forms a photography club and meets fellow photographer Kanae Mitani.

== Characters ==
=== Main characters ===
Fū Sawatari (沢渡 楓, Sawatari Fū)
Voiced by: Ayana Taketatsu
A high school girl with a love of photography. She uses a Rollei 35S camera passed on to her by her late father and is particularly interested in finding pictures containing specks of lights which she refers to as 'Tamayura'. She is a little clumsy and often trips and falls while trying to find the perfect shot. She has a habit of adding 'na no de' to her sentences. She especially likes to try to photograph Momoneko, a cat in the neighborhood. Her friends call her "Potte" (ぽって) after the noise she makes when she nervously walks.^{OVA ep. 1}
Kaoru Hanawa (塙 かおる, Hanawa Kaoru)
Voiced by: Kana Asumi
Fū's childhood friend who used to play with her back when Fū first lived in Takehara. Her reddish-brown hair is styled in a ponytail. She has a self-proclaimed 'smell fetish', taking interest in all sorts of smells, and her hobby is making various blends of pot pourri. She has not decided on that for a career though.^{OVA ep. 1}
Maon Sakurada (桜田 麻音, Sakurada Maon)
Voiced by: Yuko Gibu
A somewhat quiet girl who prefers to just whistle in her conversations.^{OVA ep. 1}
Norie Okazaki (岡崎 のりえ, Okazaki Norie)
Voiced by: Yuka Iguchi
An excitable girl with light brown hair and twin tails. She is infatuated with Fū's little brother, Kou. She enjoys making various sweets and cakes, and thinks about becoming a patissiere.^{OVA ep. 1}
Kanae Mitani (三谷 かなえ, Mitani Kanae)
Voiced by: Ai Kayano
Introduced in Tamayura: More Aggressive. A local girl who is Fū's senior in high school, who joins her photography club. Like Fū, she also enjoys photography and uses a Pentax Q camera.

=== Family members ===
Kou Sawatari (沢渡 香, Sawatari Kō)
Voiced by: Kanako Miyamoto
Fū's little brother, who is sometimes mistaken for a girl. He is the one who rekindled Fū's love of photography following their father's death.^{OVA ep. 1}
Tamae Sawatari (沢渡 珠恵, Sawatari Tamae)
Voiced by: Megumi Ogata
Fū and Kou's mother who decided to move to Takehara after Fū expressed a desire to return there. She works in her mother's café, often trying out new recipes.^{OVA ep. 1}
Fū's grandmother (楓の祖母, Fū no Sobo)
Voiced by: Yoshiko Matsuo
Fū and Kou's grandmother who runs a café where Fū and her family live.^{OVA ep. 1}
Kazuma Sawatari (沢渡 和馬, Sawatari Kazuma)
Fū's father, who died before the start of the story.^{OVA ep. 1}
Sayomi Hanawa (塙 さよみ, Hanawa Sayomi)
Voiced by: Sayaka Ohara
Kaoru's older sister and the one who gave Fū her nickname. Her hobby is exploring small, undiscovered places and she often takes Fū and her friends on lengthy trips.^{OVA ep. 3}

=== Supporting characters ===
Riho Shihomi (志保美 りほ, Shihomi Riho)
Voiced by: Erino Hazuki
A professional photographer who took an interest in Fū after she sent her some of her photos. She gave Fū a train ticket with no destination, which is a symbol of the direction one wants to take in life.^{OVA ep. 2}
Chihiro Miyoshi (三次 ちひろ, Miyoshi Chihiro)
Voiced by: Minako Kotobuki
Fū's middle school friend during her time in Shioiri, who nicknames her "Fū-nyon". She often makes various stuffed animals and often cries easily. She made the cat shaped camera case that Fū keeps her father's camera in.
Hinomaru (日の丸) /Maestro (マエストロ, Maesutoro)
Voiced by: Jōji Nakata
The owner of a photo shop who is skilled with cameras and often flirts with female customers.^{OVA ep. 1}
Chimo Yakusa (八色 ちも, Yakusa Chimo)
Voiced by: Miyu Matsuki
The owner of the Hoboro okonomiyaki store, who is affectionately known as Hoboro-san. She is quite passionate about making okonomiyaki.^{OVA ep. 1}
Kazutarou Dougou (堂郷 和太郎, Dōgō Kazutarō)
Voiced by: Junji Majima
Fū's homeroom teacher who is quite passionate and often makes puns based on place names. He has a crush on Chimo and eventually marries her.
Komachi Shinoda (篠田 こまち, Shinoda Komachi)
Voiced by: Ryō Hirohashi
Kou's classmate who has a crush on him, sporting a rivalry against Norie for Kou's affections.
Mutsuko Shimokamiyama (下上山 むつこ, Shimokamiyama Mutsuko)
Voiced by: Chinami Nishimura
A new teacher at Fū's school who becomes the advisor of her photography club. She is also quite excitable and often tries to get Fū and Kanae to enter various contests.
Tomo (ともちゃん, Tomo-chan)
Voiced by: Nao Tōyama
Chihiro's friend and classmate, who helps her design characters based on her ideas. She speaks in a kansai dialect and gets over-excited when something piques her interest.
Momoneko (ももねこ)
Voiced by: Yukari Fukui
A strange, pink, fluffy cat that Fū is always trying to take pictures of, but can never get a good shot.
Takumi Shindou (進藤 巧美, Shindō Takumi)
Voiced by: Aya Uchida
A freshman who joins the Photography Club in Sotsugyou Shashin. She is rather aggressive and is sometimes invasive with her photography.
Suzune Maekawa (前川 すずね, Maekawa Suzune)
Voiced by: Mayu Iizuka
Takumi's friend who also joins the Photography Club. She is rather shy.

== Media ==
=== Manga ===
A manga adaptation titled Tamayura, illustrated by Momo, was serialized in Mag Garden's online Eden magazine between October 8, 2010, and March 11, 2011. A single tankōbon volume was released on May 14, 2011. A second manga adaptation titled Tamayura: Hitotose, again illustrated by Momo, was serialized in Eden between October 5, 2011, and January 20, 2013. Three volumes were released between February 14, 2012, and February 14, 2013.

=== Anime ===
Tamayura was first produced as a four-episode original video animation (OVA) series produced by Hal Film Maker and directed by Junichi Sato. The episodes were released over two Blu-ray Disc (BD) and DVD volumes on November 26 and December 23, 2010. Each episode is about 15 minutes long and is combined in a single video in two parts: the first two episodes in volume one, and the latter two episodes in volume two. The episodes had previously aired on AT-X between September 6 and December 6, 2010.

A 12-episode anime television series based on the OVAs titled Tamayura: Hitotose (たまゆら〜hitotose〜, Tamayura: The First Year) aired in Japan between October 3 and December 19, 2011. The TV series is produced by TYO Animations and directed by Junichi Sato. The TV series is being released on seven BD/DVD compilation volumes between December 21, 2011, and June 27, 2012. A 13th episode for Tamayura: Hitotose, which takes place between episodes five and six, was released on the final BD/DVD volume. Nozomi Entertainment released both the OVA series and Hitotose in North America on October 6, 2015, via distributor Right Stuf Inc.

A 12-episode second season, titled Tamayura: More Aggressive (たまゆら～もあぐれっしぶ～, Tamayura: Mo Aguresshibu), aired on AT-X between July 3 and September 18, 2013. An OVA episode was released on June 14, 2014.
A four-part animated film series, titled Tamayura: Sotsugyō Shashin (たまゆら〜卒業写真〜, Tamayura: Graduation Photo), covers the final year of the story. The first of these films was released in Japanese theaters on April 4, 2015, with the second film released on August 29, 2015, the third film released on November 28, 2015, and the fourth and final film released on April 2, 2016.

=== Music ===
Opening themes

- "Yasashisa ni Tsutsumareta nara" (やさしさに包まれたなら, Wrapped in Kindness) by Maaya Sakamoto (OVA)
- "Okaerinasai" (おかえりなさい, Welcome Home) by Toshiyuki Mori (Hitotose)
- "Hajimari no Umi" (はじまりの海, The Sea of Beginnings) by Maaya Sakamoto (More Aggressive)

Ending themes

- "Melody" (メロディ, Merodi) by Megumi Nakajima (OVA, eps 1–3)
- "Natsudori" (夏鳥, Summer Bird) by Megumi Nakajima (OVA, ep 4)
- "Kamisama no Itazura" (神様のいたずら, God's Mischief) by Megumi Nakajima (Hitotose, eps 1, 3–6, 8–10)
- "Natsudori (Uta to Piano)" (夏鳥-うたとぴあの-, Summer Bird -Voice and Piano-) by Megumi Nakajima (Hitotose, ep 2)
- "Hoshizora" (星空, Shooting Star) by Megumi Nakajima (Hitotose, ep 7)
- "Ashita no Hidamari" (あしたの陽だまり, Tomorrow's Sunshine) by Ayana Taketatsu, Kana Asumi, Yuko Gibu and Yuka Iguchi (Hitotose, ep 11)
- "A Happy New Year" by Maaya Sakamoto (Hitotose, ep 12)
- "Hanabi" (花火, Fireworks) by Natsumi Kiyoura (Hitotose, ep 5.5)
- "Arigatō" (ありがとう, Thank You) by Megumi Nakajima (More Aggressive, ep 1–10)
- "Kazeiro no Film" (風色のフィルム, Wind-colored Film) by Megumi Nakajima (More Aggressive, ep 11)
- "Saigo no Haruyasumi" (最後の春休み, The Final Spring Holiday) by Haruka Chisuga (More Aggressive, ep 12)

Insert songs

- "Naisho no Hanashi" (ナイショのはなし, A Secret Talk) by Megumi Nakajima (OVA, ep 2–3)
- "Yasashisa ni Tsutsumareta nara" (やさしさに包まれたなら, Wrapped in Kindness) by Marble (Hitotose, ep 4)
- "Himawari" (ヒマワリ, Sunflower) by Ayana Taketatsu (Hitotose, ep 5)
- "Yume no Kizashi" (夢の兆し, Sign of Dreams) by Yuko Gibu and Yuka Iguchi (Hitotose, ep 6)
- "Zutto Issho (Uta to Guitar)" (ずっと一緒 -うたとギター-, Together Forever -Voice and Guitar-) by Megumi Nakajima (Hitotose, ep 9)
- "Momoneko Ondo" (ももねこ音頭, Momoneko's Dance) by Yukari Fukui (Hitotose, ep 9–10)
- "Kibō no Katachi" (希望のカタチ, The Shape of Hope) by Kana Asumi (Hitotose, ep 10)
- "Tsutsumareta" (つつまれて, Wrapped) by Marble (More Aggressive, ep 7)
- "Okaerinasai (Acoustic Ver.)" (おかえりなさい 〜Acoustic Ver.〜) by Toshiyuki Mori (More Aggressive, ep 8)
- "Kamisami no Itazura (Uta to Piano)" (神様のいたずら 〜うたとぴあの〜, God's Mischief -Voice and Piano-) by Megumi Nakajima (More Aggressive, ep 9)
- "Kibō no Katachi" (希望のカタチ, The Shape of Hope) by Marble (More Aggressive, ep 10)
