= Yoki Koto Kiku =

Japanese manga series by Koge-Donbo

- Cover of the English version of Yoki Koto Kiku, featuring the triplets, Yokiko, Kotosuke, and Kikuno Nekogami.

ヨキ、コト、キク。
- Genre: Black comedy
- Manga
- Written by: Koge-Donbo
- Published by: Jive
- English publisher: NA: Broccoli Books
- Magazine: Comi Digi + (former)
- Original run: 2006 – ?
- Volumes: 1

Yoki Koto Kiku (ヨキ、コト、キク。) is a Japanese shōnen manga series by Koge-Donbo. The manga was serialized in the Comic Di Gi Charat magazine and its successor, Comi Digi + magazine, and it was published in Japan under the CR Comics (Comic Rush Comics) imprint of Jive.

The English language translation of the manga is published by Broccoli Books.

== Plot ==
The patriarch of the Nekogami family dies, and he leaves his fortune to his eldest grandson Sukekiyo, who is away at war. If he does not return in 6 months, one of the younger grandchildren or Sukekiyo's fiancėe, Tamayo, will inherit the fortune. Triplets Yokiko, Kotosuke, and Kikuno plot to take out Tamayo and each other in order to claim the fortune for themselves.

== Main characters ==
Yokiko Nekogami (猫神良子, Yokiko Nekogami)
Also known as Yoki, she is the eldest of the triplets. She attends a girls' music school and dreams of becoming a star on stage. Her weapon of choice is an axe.
Kotosuke Nekogami (猫神琴介, Kotosuke Nekogami)
Also known as Koto, he is the second and only boy of the triplets. Born with a weak heart, he wishes for a cure for his sickness. He is an expert koto player. His weapon of choice are koto strings.
Kikuno Nekogami (猫神菊乃, Kikuno Nekogami)
Also known as Kiku, she is the youngest of the triplets. She admires her older sister Yoki and wishes to attend the same music school to become a songstress. She likes to arrange flowers and dress up her hair in curls. Her weapon of choice are the flower arrangement needles.
Tamayo (珠世, Tamayo)
Tamayo is the housekeeper of the Nekogami family and the fiancée of Sukekiyo Nekogami. She has a pet named Saruzo, who has the head of a monkey and the body of a miniature elephant. She and the triplets have promised Sukekiyo that they will protect the family and the house.

== Inspirations for the manga ==
=== Inugami Clan ===
Yoki Koto Kiku is a parody of Inugami Clan (犬神家の一族, Inugamike no Ichizoku), a mystery novel by Seishi Yokomizo. Inugami Clan is one of many mystery novels featuring the detective Kōsuke Kindaichi (金田一耕助, Kindaichi Kōsuke). The story begins with the death of Sahei Inugami, the patriarch of the Inugami family. Instead of leaving his fortunes with his three daughters from three different marriages, Sahei leaves the family heirlooms yoki (axe), koto (Japanese zither), and kiku (chrysanthemum) to Tamayo Nonomiya, the granddaughter of his close friend. The will read by the family lawyer states that the grandson that Tamayo selects as her husband will inherit the family fortune. The battle between the three daughters and their sons, Sukekiyo, Suketake, and Suketomo begins.

== Reception ==
Carl Kimlinger feels the story's repetitiveness is highlighted in the book. Janet Houck described the work as a doujinshi of Inugami-ke no Ichizoku. Erin Finnegan felt that the manga wasn't funny. Brigid Alverson felt the ending was unsatisfying.
