= SS-35 =

SS-35, SS 35 or SS35 may refer to:

- USS K-4 (SS-35), a K-Class submarine of the United States Navy which saw service during World War I
- BAP Islay (SS-35), a Type 209/1100 submarine of the Peruvian Navy commissioned in 1974

== See also ==
- S35 (disambiguation)
