= KimiKiss =

Franchise

- Cover art of the PlayStation 2 game featuring Yūmi Hoshino, one of its heroines

キミキス (KimiKisu)
- Video game
- Developer: Enterbrain
- Publisher: Enterbrain
- Genre: Dating sim
- Platform: PlayStation 2
- Released: May 25, 2006
- Manga
- Written by: Masashi Kokura
- Published by: Enterbrain
- Magazine: Famitsu PS2
- Original run: June 30, 2006 – unknown
- Light novel
- Written by: Chabō Higurashi
- Illustrated by: Kisai Takayama; Kamo
- Published by: Enterbrain
- Magazine: Famitsu Bunko
- Original run: July 2006 – August 2006
- Volumes: 2
- Manga

KimiKiss: Lyrical Contact
- Written by: Mimei Kuroi
- Published by: Square Enix
- Magazine: Gangan Powered
- Original run: August 22, 2006 – February 22, 2007
- Volumes: 1
- Manga

KimiKiss: Various Heroines
- Written by: Tarō Shinonome
- Published by: Hakusensha
- English publisher: NA: Tokyopop
- Magazine: Young Animal
- Original run: August 25, 2006 – March 27, 2009
- Volumes: 5
- Manga

KimiKiss: Sweet Lips
- Written by: Masahiro Itosugi
- Published by: Akita Shoten
- Magazine: Champion Red Ichigo
- Original run: December 26, 2006 – June 5, 2008
- Volumes: 1
- Anime television series

KimiKiss: Pure Rouge
- Directed by: Ken'ichi Kasai
- Produced by: Atsushi Yukawa; Kenta Suzuki; Osamu Hosokawa; Tetsuro Satomi; Yuji Matsukura
- Written by: Michihiro Tsuchiya
- Music by: Hikaru Nanase; Masaru Yokoyama; Noriyuki Iwadare
- Studio: J.C.Staff
- Licensed by: NA: Sentai Filmworks
- Original network: CTC, tvk, TV Saitama, TV Aichi, MBS, RKB
- Original run: October 6, 2007 – March 24, 2008
- Episodes: 24 + Special
- Light novel

KimiKiss: Pure Rouge
- Written by: Asaka Asahi
- Illustrated by: J.C.Staff; Mario
- Published by: Enterbrain
- Magazine: Famitsu Bunko
- Original run: October 2007 – January 2008
- Volumes: 2
- Manga

KimiKiss: After Days
- Written by: Rechi Kazuki
- Published by: Square Enix
- Magazine: Gangan Powered
- Original run: December 2007 – April 2008
- Volumes: 1

KimiKiss (キミキス, KimiKisu; lit. "Your Kiss") is a Japanese dating simulation game for the PlayStation 2. Developed by Enterbrain in 2006, KimiKiss has become a media franchise, which includes five manga adaptations, a light novel, and an anime television series directed by Ken'ichi Kasai.

== Story ==
Kouichi Aihara is a high school student who just came back from summer vacation. He has never been kissed and after returning to school he decides to develop a romantic relationship with a certain girl during 30 days.

== Characters ==
Kōichi Aihara (相原 光一, Aihara Kōichi)
Voiced by: Takahiro Mizushima (Drama CD)
The protagonist in the game and the Various Heroines manga. Kōichi is in class 2A and is the older brother of Nana. In the game his given name and surname can be customized by the player. In the anime his character was split in two characters - Kouichi Sanada (who received the original protagonist's looks and given name) and Kazuki Aihara (who received the original protagonist's soccer skills, surname, Nana as little sister, and voice actor from the Drama CD).
Yūmi Hoshino (星乃 結美, Hoshino Yūmi)
Voiced by: Ami Koshimizu
The main heroine in the original Visual Novel. Kouichi's classmate, who works in school library. In anime she is Kouichi's love interest. She has always been shy but the help of Mao and the others, she becomes more outgoing. She also has feelings for Kouichi and they begin to date. However, she realizes that he has feelings for Mao even before he breaks up with her.
Mao Mizusawa (水澤 摩央, Mizusawa Mao)
Voiced by: Haruna Ikezawa
The main heroine in the anime. Mao is very active, energetic, and cheerful student in class 3-A. In anime, she lives with Kouichi and his mom after moving back to Japan from Paris, but moves out due to her feelings for Kouichi. Mao's first love interest in the anime is a quiet, tough looking boy named Eiji Kai. At first, they dislike each other, but soon develop feelings and begin to date. The relationship does not last long due to Mao realizing her feelings for Kouichi and she breaks up with Eiji.
Asuka Sakino (咲野 明日夏, Sakino Asuka)
Voiced by: Ryou Hirohashi
A girl from class 2-С (in anime she is in class 2-A with Kouichi and Kazuki), who loves to play soccer. In anime she starts to have feelings for Kazuki after he helps her. Sakino discovers that Eriko and Kazuki are conducting 'experiments' together which angers her, and she wants them to stop the experiments. She soon realizes that Kazuki is in love with Eriko, despite the fact she always pushes him away. Towards the end of the anime, Sakino confesses her feelings to Kazuki, but is turned down. She gives him a kiss as a goodbye to her feelings for him.
Eriko Futami (二見 瑛理子, Futami Eriko)
Voiced by: Rie Tanaka
An extremely introverted girl from class 2С, who is always cold to others and has an IQ score of 190. She usually spends time alone in the science lab. In anime she starts performing experiments with Kazuki (such as kissing him), who found her hiding place, in order to find out why people fall in love. Gradually she develops feelings for Kazuki and opens up to others. In the last episode, Eriko professes her love to Kazuki and the two kiss.
Mitsuki Shijō (祇条 深月, Shijō Mitsuki)
Voiced by: Mamiko Noto
A wealthy girl from class 2-B, who is proficient in many arts.
In the anime she is in class 2-C with Eriko, and gets recruited into the Movie Research Club. She has had an arranged engagement for most of her life yet has never met the man.
Nana Aihara (相原 菜々, Aihara Nana)
Voiced by: Sakura Nogawa
The younger sister of the protagonist (Kazuki in the anime). She carries an accessory depicting a green frog whom she has named Iwao. In the game, her surname changes to match the player customization of the protagonist's surname.
Narumi Satonaka (里仲 なるみ, Satonaka Narumi)
Voiced by: Kaori Mizuhashi
A good friend and classmate of Nana. She is an expert at cooking udon and has a strong interest of creating new varieties of udon. Like Nana, she also carries an accessory depicting a frog whom she has named Juliet.
Akira Hiiragi (柊 明良, Hiiragi Akira)
Voiced by: Jun Fukuyama
A close friend and classmate of the protagonist. He offers love-related advice to the protagonist from time to time.
In the anime, he is the president of the Movie Research Club, and always forces Kouichi and Kazuki into helping him with his films.
Megumi Kuryū (栗生 恵, Kuryū Megumi)
Voiced by: Mai Nakahara
A member of the school disciplinary group. She is high strung and the self-appointed head of the school morals enforcement agency. In anime her love interest is Hiiragi.
Tomoko Kawada (川田 知子, Kawada Tomoko)
Voiced by: Ayako Kawasumi
The school's modern Japanese language teacher and adviser to the swimming club. She is Mao Mizusawa's home room teacher.

=== Anime-only characters ===
Kōichi Sanada (真田 光一, Sanada Kōichi)
Voiced by: Satoshi Hino
An anime only character and the first protagonist. Kōichi's first love interest is Yūmi Hoshino, but he gradually develops feelings for his childhood friend, Mao. At the end of the anime, he and Mao become a couple.
Kazuki Aihara (相原 一輝, Aihara Kazuki)
Voiced by: Takahiro Mizushima
An anime only character and the second protagonist, he is Kouichi's classmate and good friend. Kazuki enjoys playing soccer and his love interest is Eriko. Kazuki meets Eriko in a classroom and experienced his first kiss when she suddenly began an 'experiment' with him. Kazuki eventually realizes that he has fallen for Eriko, and chases after her all throughout the anime. The two finally become a couple near the end of the anime.
Eiji Kai (甲斐 栄二, Kai Eiji)
Voiced by: Takahiro Sakurai
An anime only character. Mao's classmate, who plays the saxophone and works in a jazz bar. Initially, he does not get along with Mao but gradually opens up to her. He and Mao date for a while but she breaks up with him after she admits her feelings for Kouichi to him. They remain friends.

== Adaptations ==
=== Manga ===
Several manga adaptations have been made.

- KimiKiss: Lyrical contact (キミキス 〜lyrical contact〜, KimiKisu ~lyrical content~), in Gangan Powered, and in tankōbon form, one volume has been released, from 2006 to 2007. Focuses on Yuumi's route.
- KimiKiss: After days (キミキス after days, KimiKisu after days), in Gangan Powered, published from December 2007 to April 2008. Focuses on Eriko's route.
- KimiKiss: Various heroines (キミキス -various heroines-, KimiKisu -various heroines-), in Young Animal and in tankōbon form (five volumes: #1 Mao Mizusawa, #2 Asuka Sakino, #3 Mitsuki Shijyo, #4 Eriko Futami, and #5 Yuumi Hoshino). Adapts all routes, one volume for each volume.
- KimiKiss: Sweet lips (キミキス 〜スウィートリップス〜, KimiKisu ~Suwitō Rippusu), in Champion Red Ichigo, and in tankōbon form, two volumes from December 2006 to June 2008.

=== Light novel ===
Two two-volume series of light novels have been published by Famitsu Bunko: KimiKiss and KimiKiss: Pure Rouge.

=== Anime ===
The anime, titled KimiKiss: Pure Rouge, began airing in Japan on October 6, 2007. The series is produced by J.C.Staff and directed by Ken'ichi Kasai. The series focused more on the girls and their daily lives with a more romantic genre. North American anime distributor Section23 Films released Pure Rouge on DVD, October 5, 2010.

Story

Kouichi Sanada wakes from a dream where his younger self was crying. When he goes to answer the door, he finds a beautiful woman standing in front of him. She quickly enters while reacquainting herself with things in the house, and even enters the shower. A confused Kouichi tries to remember if he knew a girl like this in the past, while trying to remember his friend Kazuki Aihara comes in. A misunderstanding is caused when the girl comes out of the bathroom, but she suddenly realizes who Kazuki is. Kazuki also realizes who the girl is: his childhood friend Mao Mizusawa. Finally realizing this, Kouichi welcomes Mao back. When Kouichi's mother begins talking to Mao about her living in France, Kouichi notices how much Mao has changed. The story then continues with them going to the same school. Many relationships are formed with different people during their school years but always thought to be a mistake as Mao realizes her true feelings toward Kouichi while Sakino and Futami develops feelings for Kazuki.

Opening theme
"Aozora loop" (青空loop, lit. Blue Sky loop) by Marble. Composed by Micco.
Ending themes
"Negaiboshi" (願い星, lit. Wishing Star) by Snow* (episodes 1 - 12)
"Wasurenaide" (忘れないで, lit. I won't forget) by Suara (episodes 13 - 24). Composed by Shilo.
