= S35 =

S35 may refer to:

== Aviation ==
- Beechcraft S35 Bonanza, an American general aviation aircraft
- Okanogan Legion Airport, in Okanogan County, Washington, United States
- Short S.35 Shetland, a British seaplane
- Sikorsky S-35, an American sesquiplane

== Naval vessels ==
- SMS S35 (1914), a torpedo boat of the Imperial German Navy
- Spanish submarine Narcíso Monturiol (S35)
- USS S-35 (SS-140), a submarine of the United States Navy

== Other uses ==
- S35 (Long Island bus), New York
- S35 (ZVV), a regional railway line of the Zürich S-Bahn
- Jinbei S35, a Chinese SUV
- S35: This material and its container must be disposed of in a safe way, a safety phrase
- Section 35 of the Constitution Act, 1982, Canada
- SOMUA S35, a French cavalry tank of the Second World War
- Sulfur-35, an isotope of sulfur
- S35, a postcode district in Sheffield, England

== See also ==
- SS-35 (disambiguation)
- 35S (disambiguation)
