= Pita-Ten =

Japanese manga & anime television series

- Cover of Pita-Ten volume 3 by Tokyopop. The character on the cover is the protagonist Kotarou Higuchi.

ぴたテン
- Genre: Fantasy
- Manga
- Written by: Koge-Donbo
- Published by: MediaWorks
- English publisher: AUS: Madman Entertainment; NA: Tokyopop (Revoked)
- Magazine: Dengeki Comic Gao!
- Original run: October 1999 – August 2003
- Volumes: 8
- Anime television series
- Directed by: Toshifumi Kawase; Yūzō Satō
- Produced by: Eiji Kanaoka; Kazuya Watanabe; Takashi Yokozawa; Tetsuro Satomi; Kōji Morimoto
- Written by: Akemi Omode; Yasuko Kobayashi
- Music by: Masumi Itō
- Studio: Madhouse (Note: Animation production assistance (アニメーション制作協力) for all episodes provided by Studio Matrix.)
- Licensed by: NA: The Right Stuf International
- Original network: TXN (TV Osaka)
- Original run: April 7, 2002 – September 29, 2002
- Episodes: 26
- Light novel
- Written by: Yukari Ochiai
- Illustrated by: Koge-Donbo
- Published by: MediaWorks
- English publisher: NA: Seven Seas Entertainment
- Imprint: Dengeki Bunko
- Original run: April 10, 2002 – February 10, 2003
- Volumes: 3

Pita-Ten (Japanese: ぴたテン, Hepburn: Pitaten) is a Japanese manga by Koge-Donbo. It was serialized in the shōnen manga magazine Dengeki Comic Gao! between the October 1999 and August 2003 issues and was later collected into eight tankōbon volumes. The eight volumes were localized for North America by Tokyopop; Madman Entertainment used Tokyopop's translations for distribution in Australasia. The plot follows Kotarou Higuchi who becomes acquainted with the angel Misha, and the demon Shia.

Pita-Ten has spun off an anthology manga, art books, a light novel series, and an anime; the anime resulted in a radio program and audio disc releases such as soundtracks and image songs. Tokyopop's volumes of Pita-Ten ranked on ICv2's monthly top one-hundred selling graphic novels. English reviewers praised the plot and artwork, generally describing the series as cute.

== Plot ==
Kotarou Higuchi is befriended by his neighbor Misha, an angel-in-training.^{[ch. 1]} He is later acquainted with Shia, a demon, who is urged by her forgotten memories to search for something.^{[ch. 7]} Kotarou continues his daily life until Shia absorbs his life energy and leaves town.^{[ch. 28]} Kotarou investigates and discovers Shia is his great-grandmother who is searching for his dying great-grandfather, Taro Higuchi.^{[ch. 35]} After the revelation, Shia regains her memories and mourns Taro's death before she also dies.^{[ch. 38]} Afterwards, Kotarou learns that Misha's test involves helping Kotarou find happiness; regardless of the result, the two will separate when the test's deadline is reached.^{[ch. 45]} Realizing Heaven's true intent, Kotarou asks Misha to rid him of his ability to see angels as he has to search for happiness himself; Misha passes the test and becomes the angel. The series ends with the two returning to their separate lives.^{[ch. 47]}

=== Characters ===
Misha (美紗)

The heroine. Misha is an angel who was friends with Kotaroh. After Kotaroh's suicide, Heaven imprisons Misha and strips her of her status because she was an indirect cause of his death. In the present, Heaven frees Misha and gives her a chance to redeem herself by having Kotarou as her test.^{[ch. 42]} In the anime, Kotarou is not related to Misha's test and are neighbors by coincidence; she was voiced by Yukari Tamura. In 2002, Misha appeared in Newtype's poll in the favorite female character category.

Kotarou Higuchi (樋口 湖太郎, Higuchi Kotarō)

The protagonist. Kotarou is a sixth-grade elementary school student at Misaki Seiei Private Academy. At a very young age he lost his mother after she saved him from a speeding truck.^{[ch. 12]} Because of this and his father's work, Kotarou is alone most of the time resulting in his stoic and independent personality. Kotarou is able to see angels, demons, and spirits because he is a descendant of Shia. He later discovers he is the reincarnation of Kotaroh Higuchi (樋口 小太郎, Higuchi Kotarō), his grand-uncle and Shia's son.^{[ch. 42]} Kotaroh's family were labeled as demons by the villager. Since Misha was Kotaroh's emotional support, he committed suicide when Misha was forced to return to heaven.^{[ch. 41]} Kotarou was initially in love with Shia which strains his friendship with Takashi. Eventually, his feelings shift towards Misha and is reinforced when Shia is revealed to be his great-grandmother.^{[ch. 38]} In the anime adaptation, Kotarou's relation to Kotaroh and Shia was removed; he was voiced by Miyuki Sawashiro.

Shia (紫亜)

Shia is a demon with the appearance of a frail feminine girl. Because of her nature, she needs to absorb life energy while in the human world to survive.^{[ch. 7]} Before the start of the series, an amnesiac Shia lived in the human world as Shima (志摩), an adopted daughter of a merchant. She married Taro Higuchi (樋口 太郎, Higuchi Tarō) and gave birth to Kotarou's granduncle and grandmother.^{[ch. 35]} Due to her demonic nature, Shia was forced to return to hell to restore her health; her demon memories overwrite her memories as Shima.^{[ch. 37]} Due to Taro's ailing health, Shia returns to the human world and subconsciously searches for him. She regains her memories as Shima when Kotarou reveals her past to her and attends Taro's funeral; ignoring her demonic nature to feed, Shia dies shortly after.^{[ch. 38]} In the anime, Shia has no relation to the Higuchi family and travels to the human world to complete her demon apprenticeship. Shia's good nature causes her to fail, and her existence is annulled; at the end of the series, Misha brings Shia back to life as a human. She was voiced by Yukana Nogami.

Takashi Ayanokoji (綾小路 天, Ayanokōji Takashi)

Takashi is Kotarou's friend and classmate. He secretly works hard to maintain his public image as a prodigy.^{[ch. 17]} He loves Koboshi but moves onto Shia when he learns Koboshi loves Kotarou.^{[ch. 43]} His family's financial difficulties forces him to abandon his dreams of enrolling in a high quality school.^{[ch. 25]} In the anime, Takashi's feelings and home life is never explored; he was voiced by Mitsuki Saiga.

Koboshi Uematsu (植松 小星, Uematsu Koboshi)

Koboshi Uematsu is Kotarou's friend and classmate. She harbors a crush on him and confesses her feelings later in the series.^{[ch. 42]} After she is rejected, Koboshi changes her outlook on life and strives to improve herself to make Kotarou regret his decision.^{[ch. 46]} In the anime, her confession does not occur; she was voiced by Rie Kugimiya.

Other characters

- Hiroshi Mitarai (御手洗 大, Mitarai Hiroshi) is Kotarou's classmate.^{[ch. 9]} He strives to better himself in order to become a dignified head of the Mitarai family.^{[ch. 15]} In the anime, Hiroshi's story remains the same, and he was voiced by Motoko Kumai.
- Kaoru Mitarai (御手洗 薫, Mitarai Kaoru) is Hiroshi's younger sister. She admires her brother and attacks anyone who insults him. She develops a crush on Takashi which prioritizes her admiration for her brother.^{[ch. 11]} In the anime, Kaoru's story remains the same and she was voiced by Sakura Nogawa.
- Klaus Rosenberg (クラウス・ローゼンバーグ, Kurausu Rōzenbāgu) is a demon who accompanies Shia and encourages her to act like a demon. He disguises himself as a black cat in public. While in cat form, he is named Nya (ニャー, Nyā) by Misha and is credited by that name in the manga and anime.^{[ch. 14]} Klaus is voiced by Yumi Touma.
- Sasha (早紗) is Misha's older sister and an angel. She is strict, formal, and often berates Misha for her laid back personality. She was voiced by Akemi Okamura.
- Shino (紫乃) is Kotarou's maternal cousin. Since her mother's death, Shino has been cared for by her and Kotarou's great-grandfather.^{[ch. 30]} Like Kotarou, she can see angels, demons and spirits.^{[ch. 29]} She moves in with Kotarou later in the series.^{[ch. 23]} In the anime, Shino's story remains the same, and she was voiced by Taeko Kawata.

== Release ==
Pita-Ten is a manga series written and illustrated by Koge-Donbo. It was serialized in Dengeki Comic Gao! between the October 1999 and August 2003 issues. The individual chapters were then collected and released in eight tankōbon volumes under MediaWorks' Dengeki Comics imprint between April 10, 2000, and September 27, 2003. The manga was localized in English for North America by Tokyopop and released the eight volumes between January 13, 2004, and March 8, 2005. Tokyopop released a special boxset containing the first four volumes on November 10, 2005. In 2011, Tokyopop's North American division was closed down and their licenses to manga franchises were revoked. Madman Entertainment licensed Tokyopop's translations for distribution in Australasia. The series has also been localized in other languages such as French, German, and Mandrain.

An anthology series entitled Pita-Ten Official Fan Book (Note: ぴたテン公式コミックファンブック, Pita-Ten Kōshiki Komikku Fan Bukku) was published by MediaWorks between March 27 and September 27, 2002. The fan books were licensed and released in English by Tokyopop between November 8, 2005, and July 7, 2006.

=== Volume list ===
No.	Original release date	Original ISBN	North America release date	North America ISBN
1	April 10, 2000	978-4-8402-1528-2	January 13, 2004	978-1-59182-627-9
Chapters 1–7
A boy named Kotarou Higuchi becomes acquainted with his new neighbor, the angel-in-training named Misha. Misha insists on being friends with Kotarou and after seeing the lack of parental care, plays the role of a mother. Misha follows Kotarou to school and becomes acquainted with his friends, Takashi Ayanokoji and Koboshi Uematsu. Kotarou and his friends later befriend an amnesiac demon girl named Shia. In Shia's desperation for life energy, she absorbs Kotarou's energy which puts him in a coma. Misha decides to save Kotarou by exchanging her energy for Kotarou's; Misha also decides to let Shia live with her after sympathizing with her loneliness.
2	October 27, 2000	978-4-8402-1692-0	March 9, 2004	978-1-59182-628-6
Chapters 8–13
Kotarou's class receives a new transfer student named Hiroshi Mitarai who begins a one-sided rivalry with Takashi. Hiroshi decides to compete with Takashi for Misha's love in the play The Tale of the Bamboo Cutter. Takashi is injured during practice and has Kotarou replace him in the play. Hiroshi's little sister, Kaoru, decides to avenge Hiroshi's honor by pranking Takashi, but falls in love with him instead. Later, Misha saves Kotarou from being run over by a truck. Kotarou reminisces about his mother who died saving him from a similar situation and is comforted by Shia. Shia's cat, dubbed as Nya by her friends, tells her to absorb some life energy from Kotarou in order to spur her lost memories. The next day, a magical reaction between Kotarou and Shia causes them to fall asleep.
3	April 27, 2001	978-4-8402-1798-9	May 11, 2004	978-1-59182-629-3
Chapters 14–19
While asleep, Kotarou experiences visions of Shia as his mother and a meeting with Misha as an angel. The next day, Hiroshi arranges a study session for his friends and Kotarou learns about Misha's angel exam. Misha's sister, Sasha, arrives on Earth to perform her duties as an angel to help the needy. She witnesses Takashi's love for Shia and uses her magic to have him confess to her. Shia is indifferent to Takashi's confession, while Kotarou experiences jealousy.
4	October 27, 2001	978-4-8402-1984-6	July 13, 2004	978-159182-630-9
Chapters 20–25
Shia asks her friends to help her make green curry for a customer. Kotarou comforts Misha after she fails her angel exam and encourages her to remember why she wanted to be an angel in the first place. Misha reminisces about seeing angel wings and shows Kotarou her wings, revealing her identity as an angel to him. Kotarou loses his little cousin, Shino, at an amusement park and has his friends help find her. The next day, Shino leaves the house to search for Kotarou at school. Later, Takashi learns his family's financial situation prevents him from applying to middle school and is comforted by Shia.
5	April 27, 2002	978-4-8402-2110-8	September 14, 2004	978-1-59182-631-6
Chapters 26–31
A photograph from Shino spurs Shia's memories causing her to realize she's running out of time. Since Kotarou's energy is somehow linked to her past, Shia absorbs his life energy before leaving town. In the coma, Kotarou converses with a young Shia and sees a vision of an apple tree and his great-grandfather, Taro Higuchi. With Shia missing, Kotarou meets his great-grandfather to investigate and discovers a picture of Shia in a family album. Kotarou finds Shia in a snowstorm; Shia is encouraged by her Nya to absorb more of Kotarou's energy to regain her memories. Misha teleports Kotarou to safety but drops him inside his great-grandfather's memories. There, he witnesses Taro's childhood with Shia's past identity, Shima.
6	October 26, 2002	978-4-8402-2222-8	November 9, 2004	978-1-59182-632-3
Chapters 32–37
In the memory, Taro and Shia's love for each other grow and the two plant an apple tree together; the two are then separated during a civil war. Years later, the two are reunited as adults and marry where they have two children named Kotaroh and Shino; Kotarou then deduces Shia is his great-grandmother. Kotarou starts to see Kotaroh's memories and learns of Kotaroh's friendship with Misha. Due to Taro's death, Misha pulls Kotarou back to reality. Kotarou confronts Shia and reveals his discoveries to her, leading Shia to regain memories. Shia reveals she left her family before her hunger forced her to drain her children's energy. Kotarou asks Shia to return home with him and resume their daily life, to which she agrees.
7	May 26, 2003	978-4-8402-2367-6	January 11, 2005	978-1-59532-016-2
Chapters 38–42; Special Lessons
After attending Taro's funeral, Shia ignores her demonic instincts for life energy and dies as a result. Later, Sasha reveals to Kotarou his happiness is Misha's angel exam; Sasha then uses magic to show the past involving Kotaroh and Misha. The memories reveal that Kotaroh's family have been labeled as demons due and that Misha was Kotaroh's only source of comfort. When Kotaroh learns that Misha has been banned from Earth due to her interactions with him, he commits suicide in order to stay with Misha. His suicide causes Misha to become a fallen angel and she is imprisoned by heaven. Years later, Kotaroh reincarnates as Kotarou; heaven decides to give Misha a chance to redeem herself and makes Kotarou her angel exam. Kotarou is hurt by this revelation, believing Misha only sees him as Kotaroh. He runs away and finds Koboshi who confesses her feelings towards him.
8	September 27, 2003	978-4-8402-2480-2	March 8, 2005	978-1-59532-017-9
Chapters 43–47
In his anger, Kotarou decides to lead Koboshi on. Realizing the cruelty in his actions, Kotarou declines Koboshi's affections and confesses his feelings to Misha. Kotarou discovers that if Misha passes her exams, she will return to heaven; on the other hand if she fails, her existence will be annulled. As Kotarou struggles with his emotional dependence on Misha, he realizes Koboshi and Takashi's efforts to overcome hardships by themselves and accepts Misha's eventual departure. With this insight on the purpose of the test, Kotarou requests Misha to remove his abilities to see angels; after she does, Misha regains her status as an angel and Kotarou resumes his normal life.

== Adaptations ==
=== Books and publications ===
Three light novels, written by Yukari Ochiai, were published by MediaWorks under their Dengeki Bunko imprint between April 15, 2002, and February 25, 2003. Koge-Donbo provided the cover illustrations and Rina Yamaguchi drew the illustrations used in the novels. The novels were localized for North America by Seven Seas Entertainment, which released the first two volumes in March and July 2008.

An art book titled Pita-Ten Postcard Art Book (Note: ぴたテン ポストカード画集, Pita-Ten Posutokādo Gashū) was published MediaWorks on February 27, 2002. Two art books for the anime adaptation titled How To Enjoy Pita-Ten (Note: ぴたテンの楽しみ方, Pita-Ten no Tanoshimikata) were published by MediaWorks between August 25 and November 15, 2002. An art book titled Koge-Donbo Illustration Collection: Pita-Ten (Note: コゲどんぼ画集 ぴたテン, Koge-Donbo Gashū Pita-Ten) was published by MediaWorks on December 22, 2003. Tokyopop localized Koge-Donbo Illustration Collection: Pita-Ten on May 9, 2006.

=== Anime series ===
An anime based on the manga was produced by TV Osaka, Yomiko Advertising, Pita Group, and animated by Madhouse. The series premiered on TX Network between April 7 and September 29, 2002. It was also broadcast on Higashinippon Broadcasting, Hiroshima Home Television, Nagano Broadcasting Systems, Kumamoto Asahi Broadcasting, The Niigata Television Network 21, Ishikawa TV, Nara Television, Biwako Broadcasting, TV Wakayama, and Nankai Broadcasting. Bandai Visual collected the series into nine VHS and DVD mediums and released them between June 25, 2002, and April 25, 2003. A DVD box was released on December 22, 2011. The opening and ending themes had special editions singles with the anime's art on the cover. AnimeNation entered negotiations to localize the series for North America but withdrew due to licensing fees. In July 2015, Right Stuf Inc.'s Nozomi Entertainment announced an English subtitled release for North America with no English dub.

Several soundtracks were released based on the anime. Pita-Ten Soundtrack: Happiness Concert (Note: ぴたテンサウンドトラック 「幸せ音楽会」, Pita-Ten Saundotorakku (Shiawase Ongakkai)) volume 1 and 2 were released on July and October 2002 respectively. Pita-Ten Vocal Soundtrack: Singing of Angels (Note: 「ぴたテン」ヴォーカルアルバム 天使たちの合唱会, Pita-Ten Vuōkaru Arubamu Tenshi-tachi no Gasshō-kai) is an image song released on January 22, 2003.

=== Radio programming ===
A radio programming titled Pita Pita Angel (Note: ぴたぴたエンジェル♪, Pita Pita Enjeru) was produced to promote the anime adaptations for Pita-Ten and Galaxy Angel. It was produced by Bandai Visual, Broccoli, Lantis, and Madhouse and was broadcast on Radio Osaka, Nippon Cultural Broadcasting, and Tokai Radio. The show is hosted by Yukari Tamura, Misha's voice actress, and Ryōko Shintani, the voice actress of Galaxy Angel's Milfeulle Sakuraba. Pita Pita Angel was broadcast beginning April 4, 2002. On October 10, 2002, the show's title was changed to Pita Pita Angel Ace (Note: ぴたぴたエンジェル♪A, Pita Pita Enjeru A). The broadcast concluded on March 27, 2003.

== Reception ==
Tokyopop's localized volume four and up appeared on ICv2's monthly top one-hundred selling graphic novels. Mania.com's first impression of the manga was "cute, but not special" but retracted his opinion after Shia's introduction as she invoked fascination from the reviewer; the reviewer praised Shia's past for its direction and dark tone. Mania also praised the art, noting the transitions between scenes of "beautiful tenderness" and humor, and lauded the author for their detail in expressing emotions through facial expressions and body pose. AnimeFringe called the series fun and cute and expressed positive opinions on the culminating plot. The first three DVD volumes of the anime appeared on Oricon's charts. THEMAnime.org reviewed the anime; they criticized the premise for being excessively cute but noted the improving plot and praised the ending.

== Notes and references ==
=== Production notes ===
Primary references

Koge-Donbo. ぴたテン [Pita-Ten] (in Japanese). MediaWorks in Japan.
Pita-Ten. Tokyopop in North America. 2004. ISBN 9781591826279.

- Vol. 1 (ch. 1–7): Volume 1 ISBN 978-4-8402-1528-2 (Japan), ISBN 978-1-59182-627-9 (North America)
- Vol. 2 (ch. 8–13): Volume 2 ISBN 978-4-8402-1692-0 (Japan), ISBN 978-1-59182-628-6 (North America)
- Vol. 3 (ch. 14–19): Volume 3 ISBN 978-4-8402-1798-9 (Japan), ISBN 978-1-59182-629-3 (North America)
- Vol. 4 (ch. 20–25): Volume 4 ISBN 978-4-8402-1984-6 (Japan), ISBN 978-1-59182-630-9 (North America)
- Vol. 5 (ch. 26–31): Volume 5 ISBN 978-4-8402-2110-8 (Japan), ISBN 978-1-59182-631-6 (North America)
- Vol. 6 (ch. 32–37): Volume 6 ISBN 978-4-8402-2222-8 (Japan), ISBN 978-1-59182-632-3 (North America)
- Vol. 7 (ch. 38–42): Volume 7 ISBN 978-4-8402-2367-6 (Japan), ISBN 978-1-59532-016-2 (North America)
- Vol. 8 (ch. 43–47): Volume 8 ISBN 978-4-8402-2480-2 (Japan), ISBN 978-1-59532-017-9 (North America)
