= Rollei 35 S =

Compact 35 mm film camera

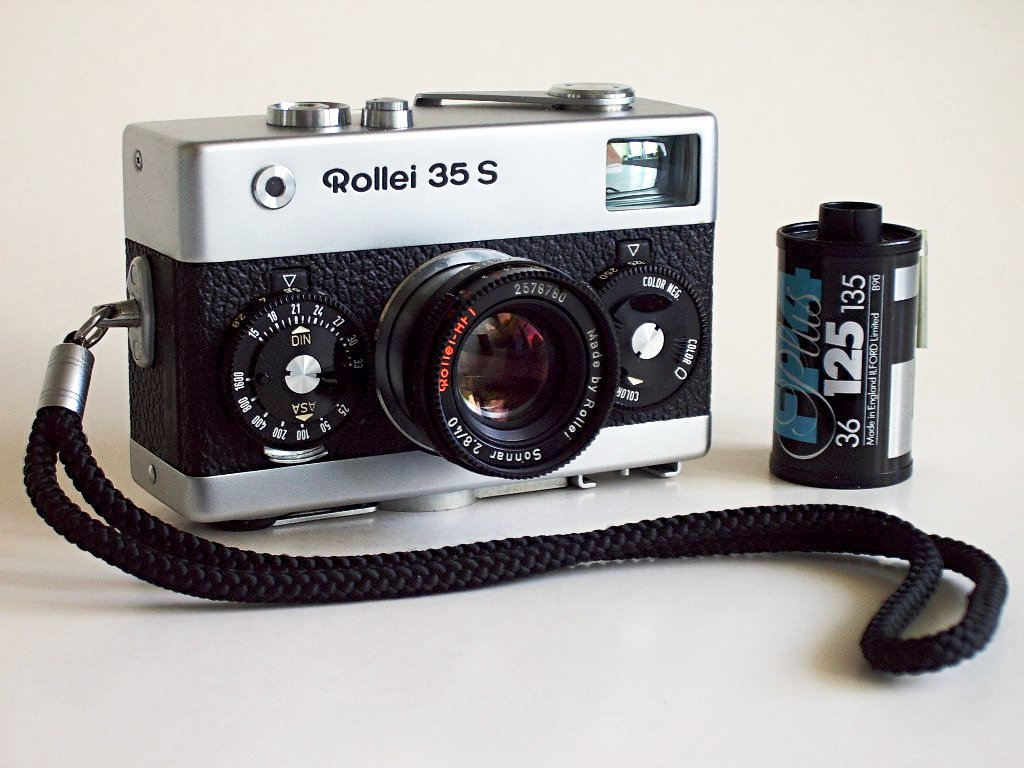
Rollei 35 S with 35mm film for scale

The Rollei 35 S is a compact 35 mm film camera designed by Heinz Waaske and made by the German camera maker Rollei, in their Singapore factory. It uses a Zeiss-licensed collapsible f2,8/40mm Sonnar lens. From most conventional cameras it differs by having an electronic flash hot shoe on the bottom.

A Rollei 35 S is featured extensively in the anime series Tamayura, where it is used by the main character.

== Specifications ==
- Format: 35mm
- Lens: Rollei HFT Sonnar 40/2,8
- Shutter speeds: 1/2 – 1/500 + B
- ISO setting: 25–1600
- Match needle metering system
- Metric/feet scale focus
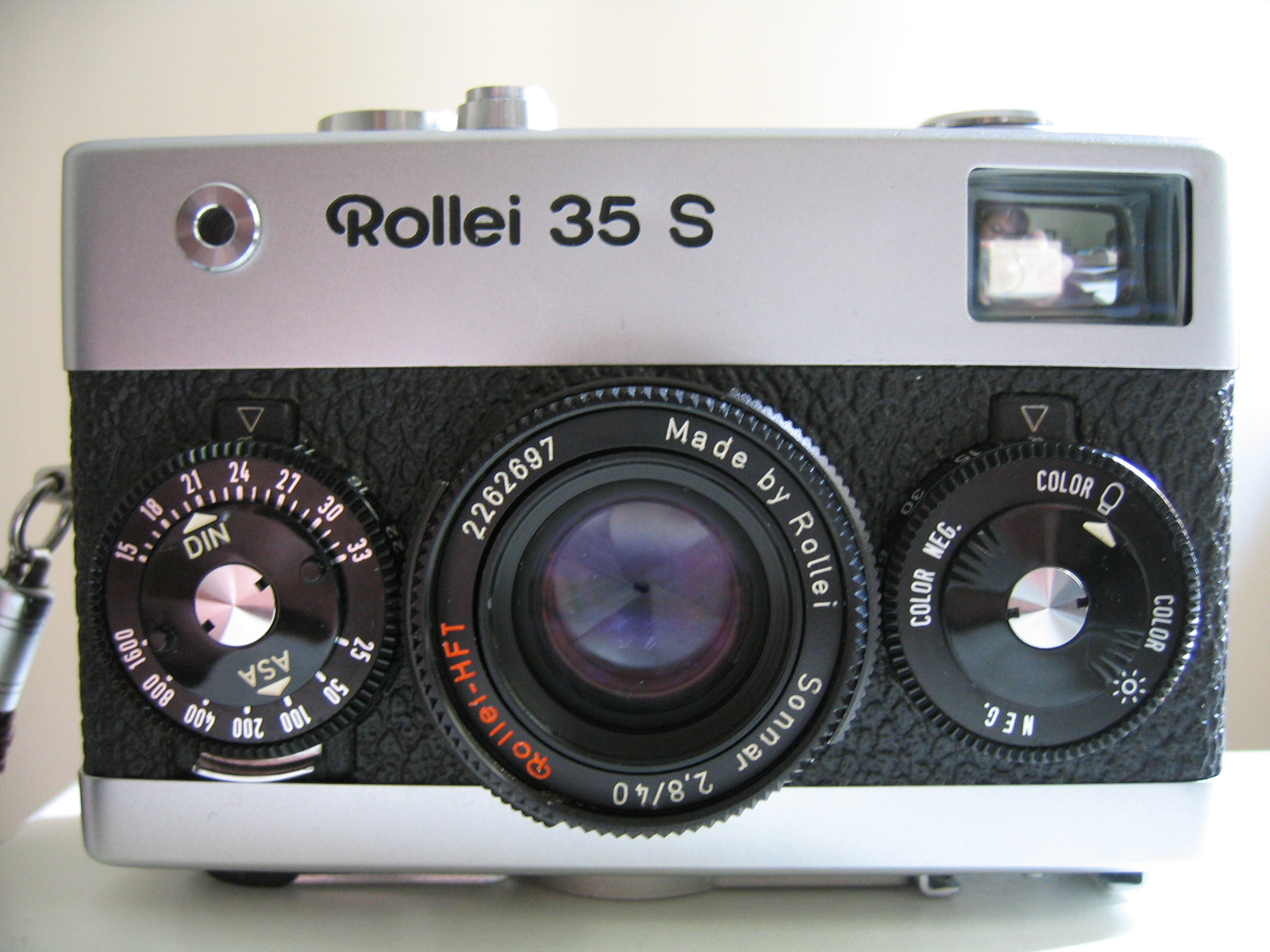
Rollei 35 S front view

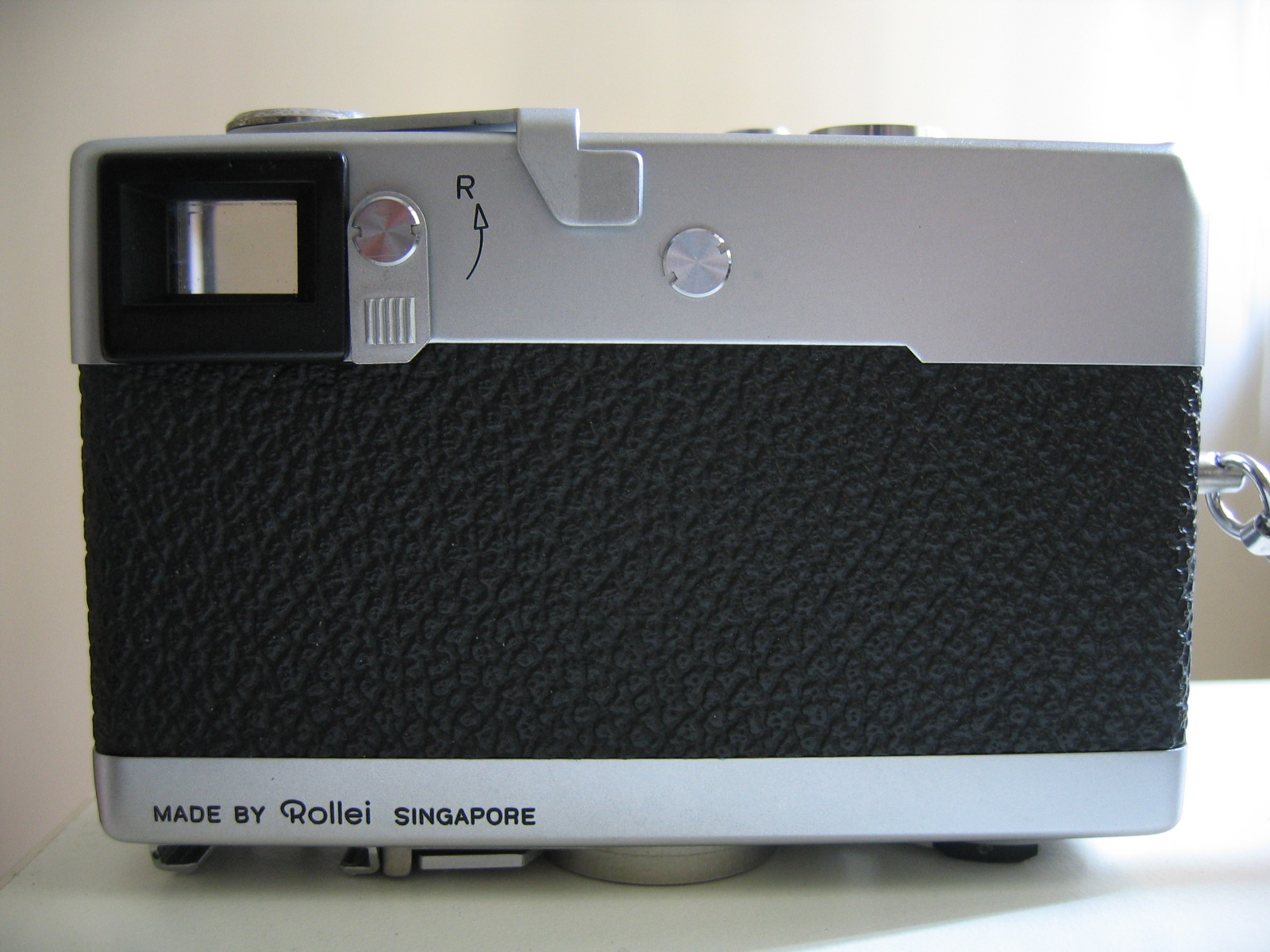
Rollei 35 S back view

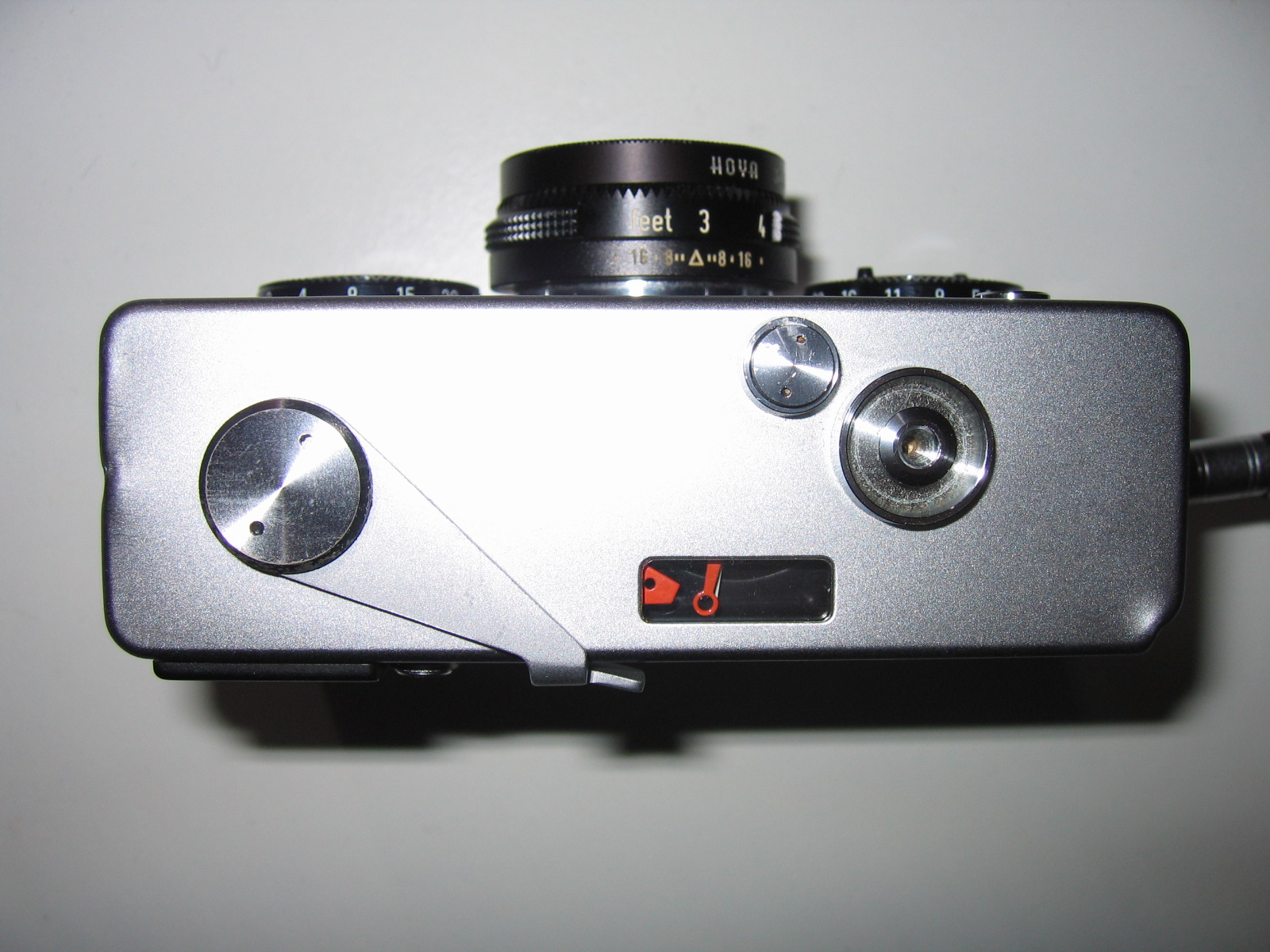
Rollei 35 S top view

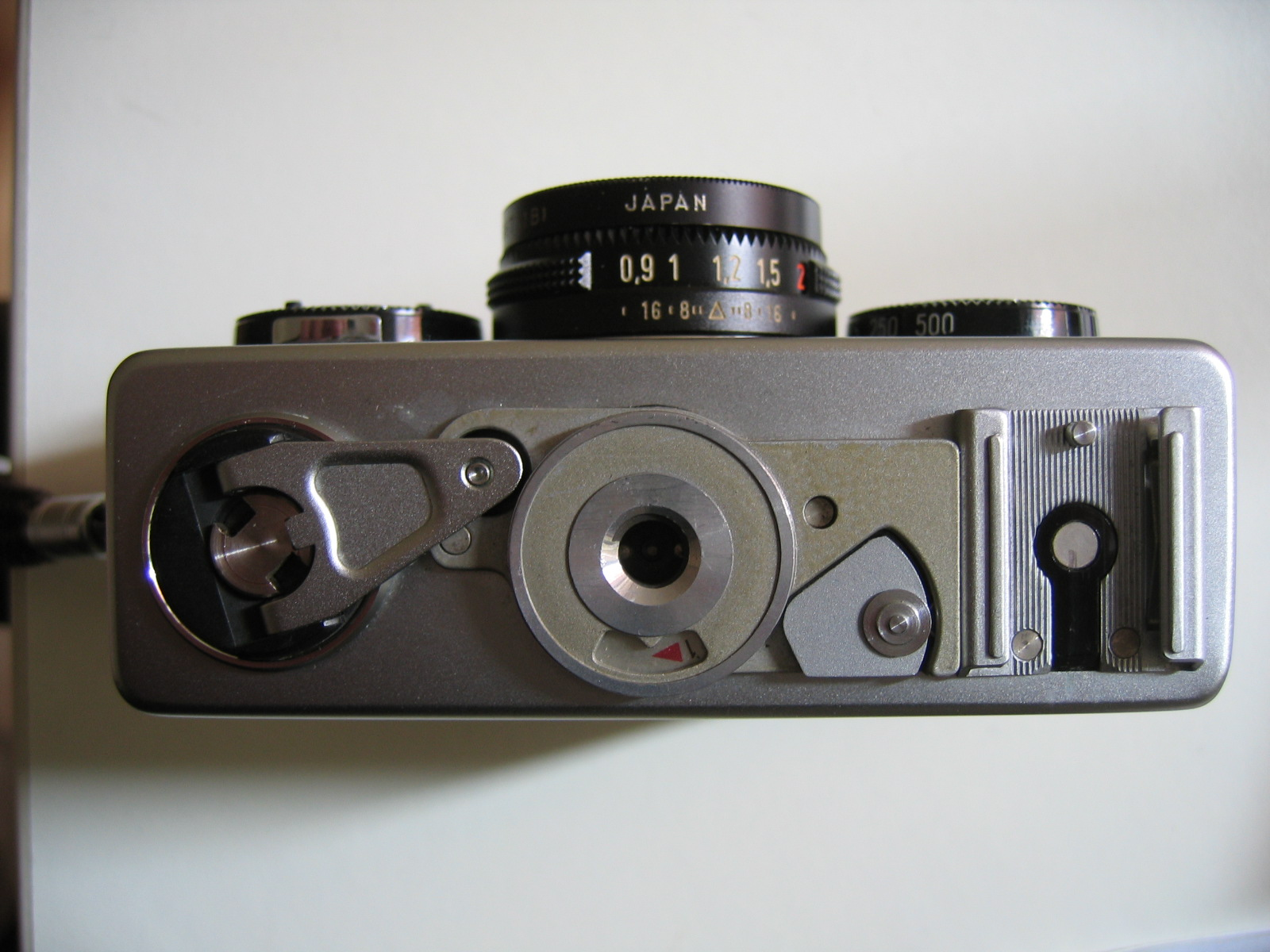
Rollei 35 S bottom view

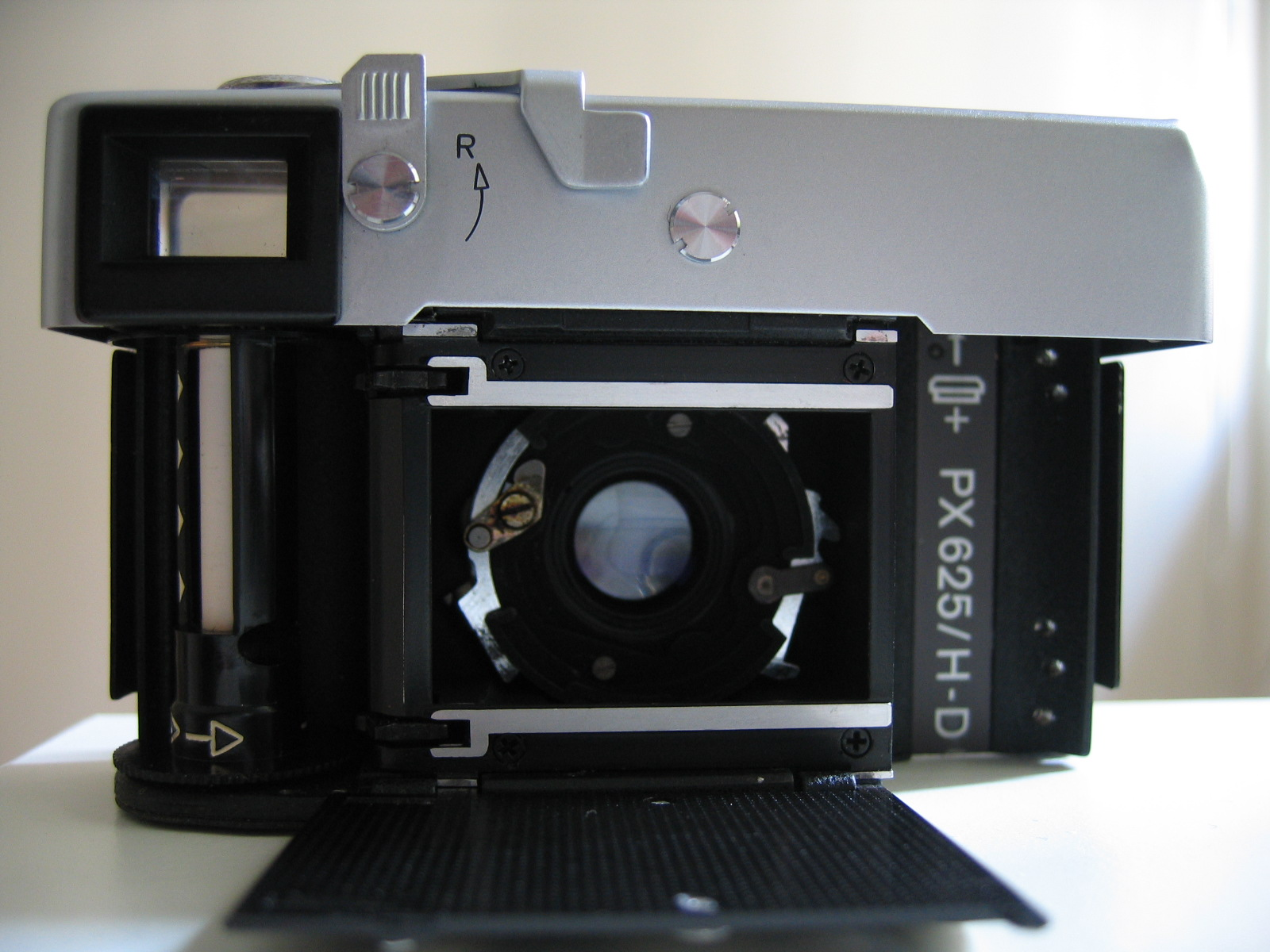
Rollei 35 S inside view

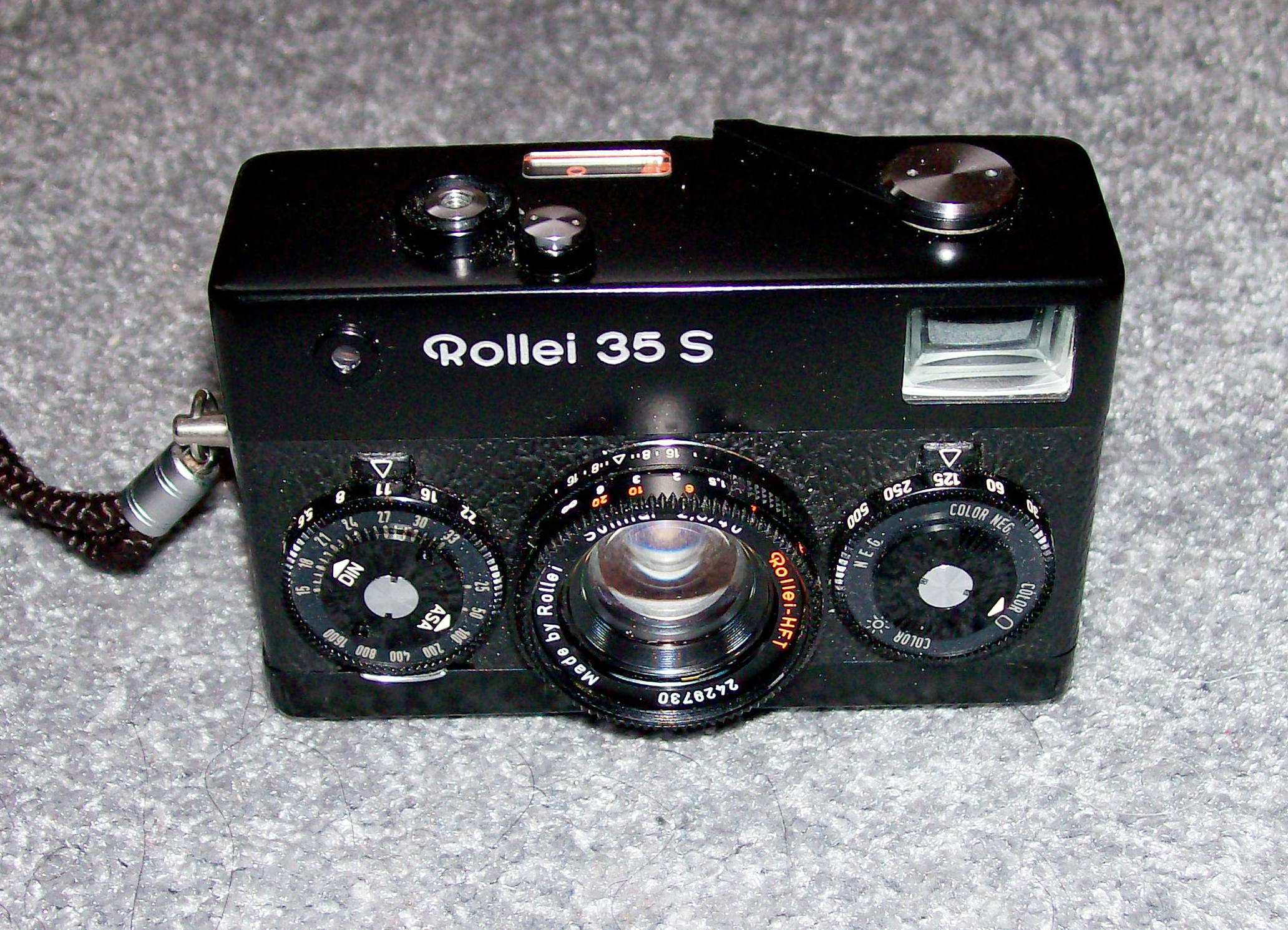
Black Rollei 35 S

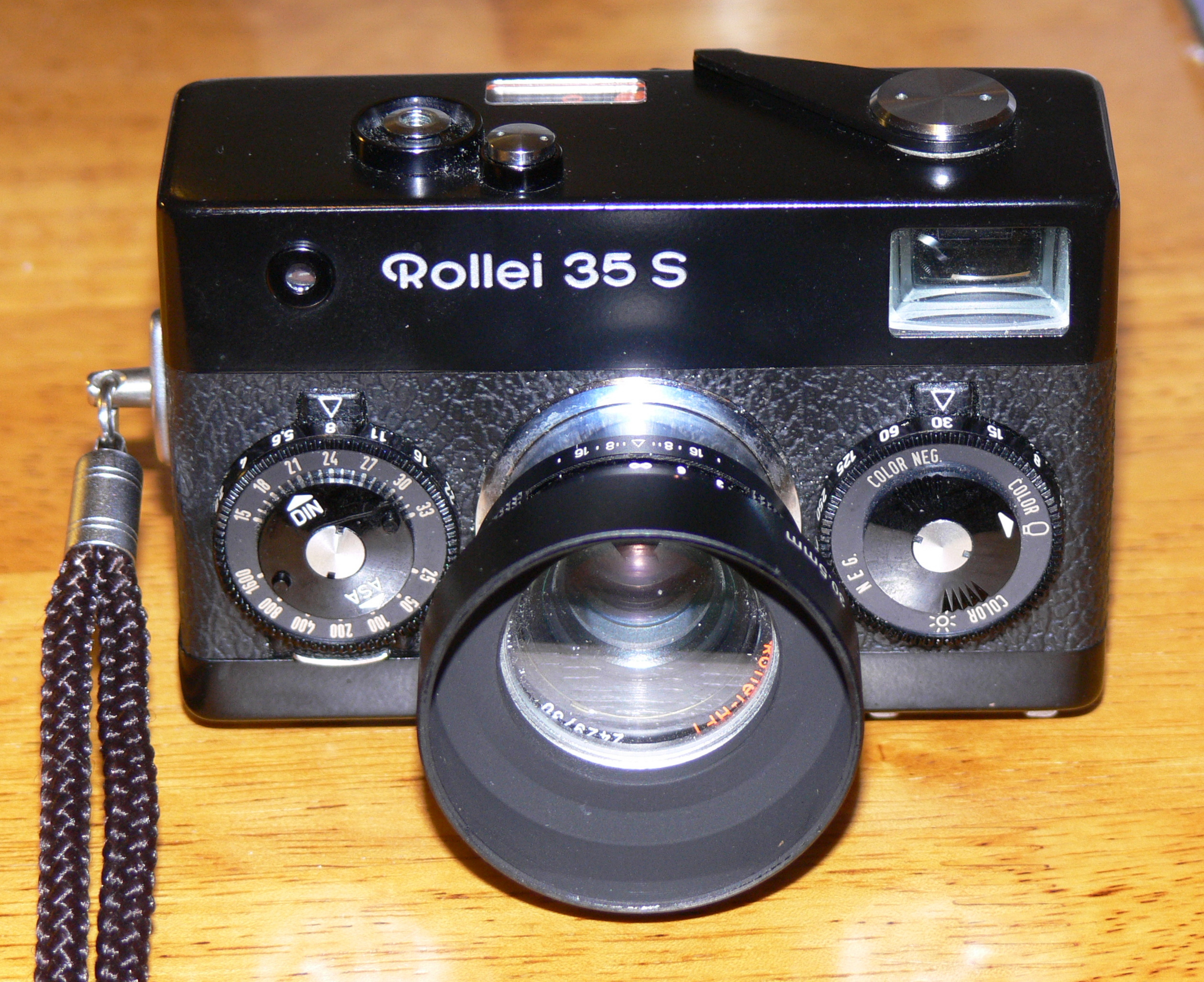
Black Rollei 35 S with metal lens hood and UV filter

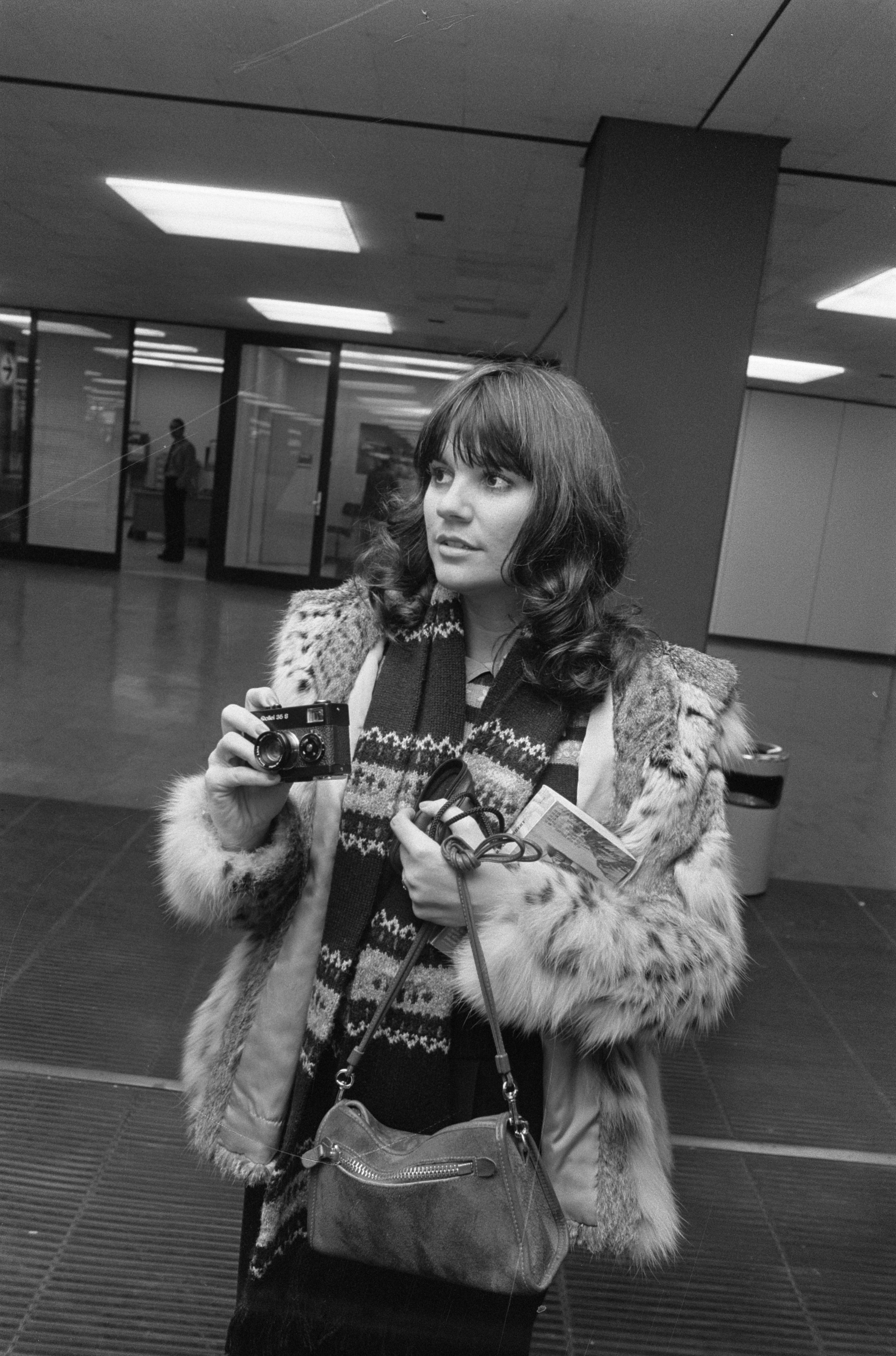
Linda Ronstadt with her Rollei 35 S
