= Koge-Donbo =

Japanese manga artist

Koge-Donbo*
- こげどんぼ*
- Born: Tokyo, Japan
- Occupation: Manga artist

Koge-Donbo* (こげどんぼ*) is a Japanese manga artist. Koge-Donbo* started her career soon after college as a doujinshi artist. She got the idea of a unique pen-name, Kobe-Donbo* from Akira Toriyama's pet cat. She made her first official US appearance at Otakon 2004 in Baltimore, MD as a Guest of Honor. Before that, she appeared at the AnimeGamers USA retail store in Los Angeles, California on July 7, 2002, for an autograph session promoting her Chocola 2001 artbook. She returned for another autograph session at the same store on August 3, 2004. She was a Guest of Honor at Anime Expo 2006, presenting the world premiere of the new Di Gi Charat animation series.

Often very shy, her drawings express her beauty and characteristic "cute" factor. She is a Harry Potter fan and has done many fan drawings on her Harry Potter fan site. In 2008, Koge Donbo* finished working on the sequel (ending with chapter 26) of the Kamichama Karin series, named Kamichama Karin Chu. A few months later, she started working on a new manga called Naki Shōjo no Tame no Pavane, serialised in Mag Garden's Comic Blade manga magazine, with six volumes out currently.

On Koge-Donbo's official website, she has announced that she would be starting a new manga called "DokiDoki! Tama-tan," featuring the "Magical Usamimi Girl" pictures that have been on her website. It was launched in Nakayoshi's March 2009 issue. Donbo added an "*" mark to her formal pen name in April 2008.

== Manga ==
- A Little Snow Fairy Sugar (shōnen manga, published by Kadokawa Shoten)
- Di Gi Charat (shōnen manga, published by Broccoli)
- Di Gi Charat: Dejiko à la Mode (shōnen manga, published by Broccoli)
- Di Gi Charat: Dejiko's Champion Cup Theatre (shōnen manga, published by Broccoli)
- Di Gi Charat Anthology (shōnen manga, published by Broccoli)
- Di Gi Charat Theater (shōnen manga, published by Broccoli)
- Di Gi Charat Theater: Dejiko's Adventure (shōnen manga, published by Broccoli)
- Di Gi Charat Theater: Dejiko's Summer Vacation (shōnen manga, published by Broccoli)
- Di Gi Charat Theater: Leave it to Piyoko! (shōnen manga, published by Broccoli)
- Di Gi Charat Theater: Piyoko is Number One! (shōnen manga, published by Broccoli)
- Doki Doki! Tama-tan (shōjo manga, published by Kodansha)
- Kamichama Karin (shōjo manga, published by Kodansha)
- Kamichama Karin Chu (shōjo manga, published by Kodansha)
- Koi-Hime Soshi (shōnen manga, published by MediaWorks)
- Kon Kon Kokon (shōnen manga, published by Jive)
- Naki Shōjo no Tame no Pavane (shōnen manga, published by Mag Garden)
- Pita-Ten (shōnen manga, published by MediaWorks)
- Sumo Oh (shōnen manga, published by Broccoli)
- Yoki Koto Kiku (shōnen manga, published by Jive)

== Artbooks ==
- Chocola (annual artbook)
- Digi Charat Fantasy Perfect Collection
- Pita-Ten Artbook

== Anime series ==
- Di Gi Charat
- Di Gi Charat Nyo!
- Kamichama Karin
- Panyo Panyo Di Gi Charat
- Pita Ten
- Sugar: A Little Snow Fairy

== Other works ==
- Aquarian Age (illustrator)
- Princess Concerto (character design)
- Di Gi Charat Fantasy (character design)
- Harry Potter Dōjinshi, as well as others done early in her career
