= Kamichama Karin =

Japanese manga series

- Cover of volume 1 of Kamichama Karin, featuring Karin Hanazono.

かみちゃまかりん
- Genre: Magical girl
- Manga
- Written by: Koge-Donbo
- Published by: Kodansha
- English publisher: NA: Tokyopop
- Magazine: Nakayoshi
- Original run: April 3, 2003 – October 2005
- Volumes: 7
- Anime television series
- Directed by: Takashi Anno
- Studio: Satelight
- Original network: TV Tokyo
- Original run: April 6, 2007 – September 29, 2007
- Episodes: 26
- Manga

Kamichama Karin Chu
- Written by: Koge-Donbo
- Published by: Kodansha
- English publisher: US: Del Rey Manga
- Magazine: Nakayoshi
- Original run: April 6, 2007 – April 2008
- Volumes: 7

Kamichama Karin (かみちゃまかりん; Little Goddess Karin) is a Japanese manga written and illustrated by Koge-Donbo about a seventh grade girl named Karin who finds out that she can transform into a goddess. The series began as a manga first serialized in January 2003. Kamichama Karin was serialized in the Japanese shōjo manga magazine Nakayoshi and published by Kodansha. While the first manga series ended at seven bound volumes, a second titled Kamichama Karin Chu (Little goddess Karin kiss) began serialization in the same magazine in July 2006, and as of April 2008, the series ended with seven bound volumes being released.

Kamichama Karin has been licensed in North America by Tokyopop. Del Rey Manga published Kamichama Karin Chu between June 24, 2008, and January 26, 2010. An anime series based on the original manga was produced by TV Tokyo, NAS, and Pony Canyon, animated by Satelight, and directed by Takashi Anno. It aired on TV Tokyo from April to September 2007.

== Plot ==
Karin Hanazono is an ordinary 13-year-old girl who becomes depressed after the death of her parents and her last companion, her pet cat Shii-chan. With poor grades, a mean aunt, and few friends who understand her, she feels lonely and desperately believes that God will help her out of these circumstances one day, holding on to the last remaining memento: a ring that originally belonged to her mother. Things change for the better for Karin when she meets Himeka Kujyou and her cousin Kazune, whom she lives with. A confrontation after Kazune insults Karin's cat and ultimately her feelings invoke something within her and the ring, causing everything to go smoothly for Karin, including weather matters. It turns out that her precious ring is in fact a holder of the power of God, and Karin, as its bearer, is a goddess. With this revelation, she is hunted down by mysterious enemies who are seeking that power while trying to control her strength. On her journey, she discovers more about her past, and the truth of her goddess heritage, as well as how it affects others around her like Kazune and Himeka.

The second season, Kamichama Karin Chu, features the main cast in the eighth grade. After Kazune returns from his trip to England, Karin and the others travel through time with a celebrity named Jin Kuga.

== Characters ==
Karin Hanazono (花園 花鈴, Hanazono Karin)
Voiced by: Mai Nakahara
Karin is the outgoing 13-year-old protagonist. She used to live with her aunt as her parents died a long time ago, but she moved in with Kazune and Himeka after they found out she can transform into a god. She is an outgoing person and sticks up for her friends, but bad at academics. Karin had a cat named Shii-chan (シ-ちゃん) that died in the beginning of the first series. At the end of Kamichama Karin Chu, it is shown that she and Kazune get married.
Kazune Kujō (九条 和音, Kujō Kazune)
Voiced by: Miyuki Sawashiro
Kazune is a seventh-grade student who is considered weak and cries frequently. He only became his current self when he turned ten years old, after discovering who he truly was. Although Kazune is a clone of Professor Kazuto Kujō, he is incomplete and passes out after transforming into god form. He often talks to Karin in a way that she claims to be sexist, talking about things like the inherent stupid behavior of girls. The couple eventually got married at the end of Chu.
Himeka Kujō (九条 姫香, Kujō Himeka)
Voiced by: Noriko Shitaya
Himeka is Karin's friend and Kazune's "cousin". She is the daughter of Kazuto and Suzuka. However, it turns out that Himeka is somewhat Karin and Kazune's daughter, due to the fact that Karin is Suzuka and Kazune is Kazuto's clone. Because of this, she is also Suzune's "older sister". Originally containing Kazuto's god research data, Himeka was split into two by Kirihiko attempting to steal the research data. One half lives with Kazune, while the other lives with the Karasuma family. When one Himeka becomes stronger, the other becomes weaker.
Kirio Karasuma (烏丸 キリオ, Karasuma Kirio)
Voiced by: Shintarō Asanuma
President of Sakuragaoka Academy, Karasuma tests the protagonists and fights them outside the campus. He offen leaves before ever winning and revealing his plot to Karin and the others while they didn't know, thinking they did. Kirio gets possessed by his father, Kirihiko, via Zeus ring he wore after his broke, until Karin and Kazune saved him.
Kirika Karasuma (烏丸 キリカ, Karasuma Kirika)
Voiced by: Yuki Kaida
Kirika is Kirio's fraternal twin sister drawn as a young man and Kirio's twin brother. With slightly masculine features to combine her natural feminine beauty, as well as a kind personality, she came across to many as a princely figure, which caused Karin to instantly develop a crush on her. Initially, Kirika did not believe that Karin is a goddess, but comes to believe in it.
Michiru Nishikiori (錦織 みちる, Nishikiori Michiru)
Voiced by: Akira Ishida
Michiru is a transfer student from England who once lived Karin, Kazune, and Himeka. When he was little, he was involved in an accident that killed his parents and crushed his left eye beyond repair, and almost died. However, Kazuto made a replaceable eye for Michiru, and saved his life. Since he was in the hospital for one year, he is a year older than Karin, Kazune, and Himeka. Michiru shares a close bond to Kazune because he initially thought of him as Kazuto, and still respects Kazune.
Jin Kuga (久我 神, Kuga Jin)
Debuting in Kamichama Karin Chu, Jin has a strong confidence in himself and wishes to regain his father's "honor", as revealed later on in the series. He shows much affection for Karin which tends to make him Kazune's love rival for her. Although Jin normally displays a sweet natire, he can sometimes be a pervert around Karin.
Suzune (鈴音)
Debuting in Kamichama Karin Chu, Suzune is the son of Karin and Kazune as well as is Himeka's "younger brother". He came from the future to warn Karin and the others of the upcoming battle with the Karasuma family and the tragic outcome.

== Media ==
=== Manga ===
Kamichama Karin was written and illustrated by Koge-Donbo. It was serialized in the monthly shōjo manga magazine Nakayoshi from the May 2003 issue released on April 3, 2003. It has been released into seven full volumes. Koge-Donbo admits in volume one at how the point of Karin's "I am God" featured her say something stupid and the manga started was as a gag. According to Koge-Donbo, Kamichama Karin was originally going to be a two-chapter one-shot manga, but she continued the story due to its unexpected popularity. The story continues on in a sequel series Kamichama Karin Chu, again with seven volumes in regular special edition volumes released in Japan. The special edition volumes include the same basic content as the regular editions but include additional content making them highly valuable to manga collectors.

=== Anime ===
An anime television adaption of Kamichama Karin began on April 6, 2007. Animation was done by the animation studio Satelight.

| No. | Title | Original air date |
|---|---|---|
| 1 | "Karin-chan's Mysterious Ring"; Transliteration: "Karin-chan no Fushigi na Yubiwa Dashī" (Japanese: 花鈴ちゃんのふしぎな指輪だしー) | 6 April 2007 |
Karin Hanazono is feeling lonely after losing her parents and cat a long time ago. One night at her cat's grave, a young boy named Kazune Kujō approaches her, but she gets angry at him when he calls her a moron, punching him in the face for it. As Karin meets Kazune's cousin, Himeka, the ring that given by her mother begins to glow mysteriously. In the opening, the time was in the future. Karin and Suzune found a Seed of Chaos. After Kazune, Jin, and Micchi transformed, they tried to destroy the Seed but could not destroy it. Rika says that their current power were not enough to destroy the seed. Karin transformed and prepared to do Love Evolution with Kazune, but Rika planted the Seed of Chaos into the Chronos Clock. The Chronos Clock went haywire and sent Karin into her past.
| 2 | "Karin-chan Becomes a Goddess"; Transliteration: "Karin-chan, Kamichama ni Henshin Dashī" (Japanese: 花鈴ちゃん、かみちゃまに変神だしー) | 13 April 2007 |
Karin's ring has been destroyed in exchange for a fake promise of reviving Shii-chan, but Kazune comes and saves it. After a confrontation between Kazune and the stranger, he agrees to meet Karin the next day to talk about her ring. Himeka disappears whole Kazune and Karin are talking, but comes back later with butterflies, accidentally causing Kazune to faint.
| 3 | "Himeka-chan's Secret"; Transliteration: "Himeka-chan no Himitsu Dashī" (Japanese: 姫香ちゃんの秘密だしー) | 20 April 2007 |
Kazune starts training Karin, but she has trouble keeping up with his regimen. Karin transfers to Seiei Sakuragaoka, but becomes depressed when she realizes she does not know much about Kazune or Himeka. Karin is cheered when she meets an upperclassman named Kirika, only to be confronted by a goddess.
| 4 | "Reunion with Shii-chan"; Transliteration: "Shī-chan to no Saikai Dashī" (Japanese: しーちゃんとの再会だしー) | 27 April 2007 |
When Karin finds a cat in her room that looks like her deceased cat, Shii-chan, Kazune decides to investigate. He heads for a suspicious-locked room and asks Karin to stay away from it. Meanwhile, Karin begins to make friends at Sakuragaoka School and Kirio plans his next attack.
| 5 | "Kazune-kun's Big Midterm Test Strategy"; Transliteration: "Kazune-kun no Chūkan Test Daisakusen Dashī" (Japanese: 和音くんの中間テスト大作戦だしー) | 4 May 2007 |
Karin learns that if she became one of the bottom twenty on the next test, she will be dropped out of Sakuragaoka. Kazune agrees to help Karin study, which she must not only deal with his study sessions, but the Kazune-Z and Kirio as well.
| 6 | "Dosukoi, Love at the School Festival"; Transliteration: "Dosukoi, Koisuru Gakuensai Dashī" (Japanese: どすこい、恋する学園祭だしー) | 11 May 2007 |
Karin's class decides to prepare a café with costumes for the school festival, where Karin invites Kirika to come to the cafe. However, she offers her cute outfit to Himeka rather than using it for the sake of Himeka's crush. Meanwhile, Kirio tells Kirika that the festival is a perfect opportunity for them, but Kirika is hesitant.
| 7 | "School Festival Dance"; Transliteration: "Hakkeyoi, Odoru Gakuensai Dashī" (Japanese: はっけよい、踊る学園祭だしー) | 18 May 2007 |
Kirika has arrived at the festival and is searching for Karin. On the other hand, Karin has switched her outfit with Himeka's sumo outfit and must run from Kirika so as not to embarrass herself. Kazune helps her by letting her wear his outfit as she runs, and Karin eventually dances with her "prince". During the dance festival, Kirika takes her ring without her knowing.
| 8 | "The Ring has Disappeared"; Transliteration: "Yubiwa ga Kiechattan Dashī" (Japanese: 指輪が消えちゃったんだしー) | 25 May 2007 |
While looking for her ring, Karin runs into a small boy, Suzune, who is looking for his mother. Together they get trapped in the past because of the door of chaos. Suzune gives Karin a ring which was given to him by his mother to use against the door. Karin could not control the power of the ring but they were rescued by two strangers. When Karin wakes up, she is in the present and forgets the previous events as a dream.
| 9 | "The Mysterious Transfer Student is Cool"; Transliteration: "Nazo no Tenkōsei, Kakkoi inda Dashī" (Japanese: なぞの転校生、かっこいいんだしー」) | 1 June 2007 |
Micchi transfers to school and approaches Karin and Kazune, saying good morning as he kisses Karin on the forehead and Kazune on the lips after that he begins to investigate the duo. While Karin, Kazune, and Himeka are searching for Karin's ring they bump into Kirio and Kirika. Because Karin lost her ring, Kazune is left to protect Himeka by himself, until Karin gets her ring back. She defeats Kirio and Kirika with the help of Kazusa.
| 10 | "Micchi's Heart-pounding Hot Springs Tour"; Transliteration: "Micchii no Dokidoki Onsen Tsuā Dashī" (Japanese: ミッチーのドキドキ温泉ツアーだしー) | 8 June 2007 |
Micchi convinces everyone to go to a hot spring where he switches people's rings around. Karin and Himeka notice a strange girl as they go into the bath, where Himeka opens up about her relationship with Kazune. He defeats Kirio who had their partners' rings. The next morning, Kazune tells Karin that he is worried about becoming nothing without being able to use his God powers.
| 11 | "Stuck Together by a Mysterious Light"; Transliteration: "Fushigi na Hikari de Pitutanko Dashī" (Japanese: 不思議な光でぴったんこだしー) | 15 June 2007 |
On their way to school, Karin and Kazune are confronted by Kirio and become attached to each other. Karin and Kazune spend the day together as Kirio wonders about their strange behavior, believing that it is an advanced battle tactic to do with being in love. When Karin and Kazune resolve their squabbling, they separate.
| 12 | "Adieu, Karin-chan's first love" Transliteration: "Adyū, Karin-chan no Hatsukoi Dashī" (Japanese: アデュー、花鈴ちゃんの初恋だしー) | 22 June 2007 |
Karin's abilities improve while Kazune grows weaker, fainting even while transforming. She finds herself telling Kazune the differences between him and Kirika. When Karin realizes that she knows Kazune, she overhears Kazune confess that he is in love with her to Micchi.
| 13 | "Kazune's Lovey-Dovey Date!?"; Transliteration: "Kazune-kun to Rabu-Rabu Dēto!? Dashī" (Japanese: 和音くんとラブラブデート！？だしー) | 29 June 2007 |
Kazune asks Karin to go out with him alone and not to tell Himeka, because he wants to get something for Himeka's birthday.
| 14 | "The Beach"; Transliteration: "Nagisa Dashī" (Japanese: 渚だしー) | 6 July 2007 |
Kirio tried to steal Karin's ring on the beach, but accidentally takes her swimsuit. Karin and Kazune enter a contest against Jin, Kirio, and Kirika. They have to win third place or Karin will not have a swimsuit. As the boys get first place, Karin realizes her feelings for Kazune.
| 15 | "Summertime Blues"; Transliteration: "Samātaimu Burūsu Dashī" (Japanese: サマータイムブルースだしー) | 13 July 2007 |
Kirio falls in love with Karin who is wearing a blonde wig. Kirio then takes her modified ring and sets a survival race for his own interests. Karin and Kazune almost kiss but Kirio interrupts.
| 16 | "The Present is a Mysterious Ring"; Transliteration: "Puresento wa Nazo no Yubiwa Dashī" (Japanese: プレゼントは謎の指輪だしー) | 20 July 2007 |
Kirika seems to be hypnotized by a strange black ring and tries to give it to Karin. The two Himeka have a strange dream with them both in it. Kazune is suspicious of Karin because of the way she was acting earlier.
| 17 | "Kirika-senpai's Confession"; Transliteration: "Kirika-senpai no Kokuhaku Dashī" (Japanese: 霧火先輩の告白だしー) | 27 July 2007 |
Karin finds Kirika unconscious and realizes that Kirika is a woman. Karin brings her to her house. Kirika tells Karin about the reason she dresses as a man. Meanwhile, Micchi brings Kazune home, as he falls unconscious. Later, Karin and Himeka are told that if Kazune tries to transform into a god, he may die.
| 18 | "The Rival is Prince Kazune"; Transliteration: "Raibaru ha Kazune Ōji Dashī" (Japanese: ライバルは和音王子だしー) | 3 August 2007 |
Kazune gets jealous of Michii because he kisses Karin, causing them to not interact. Karin's class decides to prepare for a play for the school festival. The script is a warped version of Snow White starring Karin as the poison-apple-princess, with Kazune and Micchi as princes.
| 19 | "The Romantic Theater Waits for No One"; Transliteration: "Ai no Gekijō Matanashi Dashī" (Japanese: 愛の劇場、待ったなしだしー) | 10 August 2007 |
Karin gets a stomachache and cannot perform on the day of performance. Kirio finds out about Micchi's ring and decides to attack.
| 20 | "Welcome, Micchi"; Transliteration: "Micchi, Irasshai Dashī" (Japanese: ミッチー、いらっしゃ〜い♪だしー) | 17 August 2007 |
Kazune gets Micchi to go on their side and finds out from Kirio that Micchi's ring is powerful. Karin makes a welcoming dinner called eel gratin, which Kazune and Micchi eat. A drunk Kazune experiences strange things and kisses Karin, causing commotion.
| 21 | "Himeka-chan and the Fortune-telling Glasses Guy"; Transliteration: "Himeka-chan to Uranai Meganekko Dashī" (Japanese: 姫香ちゃんと占いメガネっ子だしー) | 25 August 2007 |
Kirio decides to spy on Karin and company by pretending to be a fortune teller. Meanwhile, strange things are happening with the Himekas. Kazune destroys Kirio's ring but collapses from fighting.
| 22 | "Kazune-kun and the Festival?"; Transliteration: "Kazune-kun? to Omatsuri Dashī" (Japanese: 和音くん？とお祭りだしー) | 1 September 2007 |
Karin is visited by Suzune and future Kazune, the latter of whom gives her a book written by Kazune's father. When Kazune finally wakes up after collapsing from the fight with Kirio, Karin and friends go to the Summer Festival where Kirio kidnaps Karin and pretends to marry her.
| 23 | "A Visit to Karasuma's house" Transliteration: "Karasuma-san chi, Otaku Haiken Dashī" (Japanese: 烏丸さんち、お宅はいけんだしー) | 8 September 2007 |
At Kirio's house, Karin meets the other Himeka and befriends her. Karin and Kirika decide to work together to save the two Himeka. Meanwhile, Kirio is possessed by the ring of Zeus and goes on a rampage. In an attempt to stop her brother, Kirika disappears, presumably dead.
| 24 | "Here and There, Mr. Glasses Man is Everywhere"; Transliteration: "Acchi mo Kocchi mo Meganekko Dashī" (Japanese: あっちもこっちも メガネっ子だしー) | 15 September 2007 |
As Karin and Kazune are trapped in Kirio's house, Kirio attempts to steal Karin's ring by pretending to be Kazune, but to no avail. Micchi tries to use the power of his ring to save them, but ends up being eliminated as well. Kirio turns into Kazune's father's research partner, Kirihiko.
| 25 | "The Labyrinth of Zeus's Ring"; Transliteration: "Zeusu no Yubiwa no Meikyuu Dashī" (Japanese: ゼウスの指輪の迷宮だしー) | 22 September 2007 |
Karin and Kazune are still trapped in Kirio's house. While they are running around, Karin learns more about Kazune's father and his research. Himeka gets worried about Kazune and Karin and decides to find them at Kirio's house, where she meets the other Himeka.
| 26 | "Those Who are Lost in Time's Labyrinth"; Transliteration: "Jikū no Mayoigo-tachi" (Japanese: 時空の迷いごたち) | 29 September 2007 |
Karin's ring was broken by Kirio, but she finally remembered her past with Kazune. She was Suzuka Kujō from the past and was turned back into a baby by Professor Kujō to protect her, later learning that Himeka was their daughter. During the battle, Karin discovers a disturbing secret about Kazune, which is actually a clone of professor Kujyou and he is incomplete. After Michi gave the ring to Karin, Karin transforms into the "Universe Goddess" and makes the battle field normal again. Weeks passed together with Karin, Kazune eventually defeats Kirihiko. In the post-credits scene, the "future Kazune" appears to Karin while she was standing at Shii-chan's grave (the first place she met Kazune) and both of them go to the future.
