= Comic Blade Masamune =

Japanese shōnen manga magazine

Comic Blade Masamune.

Comic Blade Masamune (コミックブレイド Masamune, Komikku Bureido Masamune) was a Japanese bi-monthly shōnen manga magazine, published by Mag Garden that contains manga and information about those series. It began in December 2002, and ceased publication on June 15, 2007, to be revamped as a new magazine called Comic Blade Avarus.

== List of serialized titles ==
- 01 (Megumi Sumikawa)
- Asatte no Houkou (J-ta Yamada)
- Archaic Chain
- Assassins (Shou Satogane)
- Cocoon (Kenjirō Takeshita)
- Death God 4 (Shou Satogane)
- Dragon Sister! (nini)
- Erementar Gerad -Aozora no Senki- (Mayumi Azuma)
- Gun Dolls (Kenjirou)
- Harukaze Bitter★Bop (Court Betten)
- Ignite Wedge (Yoshisada Tsutsumi)
- Magica
- Maid cafe curio
- Monochrome Factor (Kaili Sorano)
- Neko Rahmen (Kenji Sonishi)
- Omisoreshimashita
- Puchi-Hound (nekoneko)
- Purism×Egoist
- Puzzle+ (Manami Sugano)
- Sketchbook (Totan Kobako)
- Tactics (Kazuko Higashiyama, art by Sakura Kinoshita)
- Uripō (Keitarō Arima)
