= The Mythical Detective Loki Ragnarok =

Manga by Sakura Kinoshita and its adaptations

- Volume 1 of the North American release

魔探偵ロキ RAGNAROK (Matantei Roki RAGNAROK)
- Manga

The Mythical Detective Loki
- Written by: Sakura Kinoshita
- Published by: Square Enix
- Magazine: Monthly Shōnen Gangan
- Original run: January 12, 1999 – November 12, 2001
- Volumes: 7
- Manga
- Written by: Sakura Kinoshita
- Published by: Mag Garden
- Magazine: Monthly Comic Blade
- Original run: March 29, 2002 – August 30, 2004
- Volumes: 5
- Anime television series
- Directed by: Hiroshi Watanabe
- Produced by: Fukashi Azuma; Masaki Yamakawa; Nobumitsu Urasaki
- Written by: Kenichi Kanemaki
- Studio: Studio Deen
- Licensed by: NA: Section 23 Films
- Original network: TV Tokyo
- English network: NA: Anime Network
- Original run: April 5, 2003 – September 27, 2003
- Episodes: 26

The Mythical Detective Loki Ragnarok (Japanese: 魔探偵ロキ RAGNAROK, Hepburn: Matantei Roki RAGNAROK; lit. 'Demon Detective Loki: RAGNAROK') is a manga by Sakura Kinoshita published from August 1999 to October 2004. A television anime based on the manga series ran for 26 episodes from April 5, 2003, to September 27, 2003, in Japan.

The series originally ran in the magazine Monthly Shōnen Gangan under the name The Mythical Detective Loki (魔探偵ロキ, Matantei Loki), but Ragnarok was added to the title when the series was purchased by publishing company MAG Garden and moved to Comic Blade magazine. The Mythical Detective Loki was collected in 7 volumes by Gangan Comics, which were later republished by Blade Comics; it has not been officially licensed for US distribution. The Mythical Detective Loki Ragnarok ran for 5 more volumes, which were published in Japan by Blade Comics, and picked up for translation and English release by ADV Manga. Chuang Yi has released an English version in Singapore. The anime has been licensed for English release by Section 23 Films. The anime series was broadcast in Mexico and South America by the anime television network, Animax, under the name Mythical Sleuth Loki.

== Plot summary ==
Loki, the Norse god of mischief, has been exiled to the human world by the god Odin for reasons that he doesn't understand. Along with being exiled, Loki is forced to take the form of a human child, and the only way he can return to the realm of the gods is by collecting the evil auras which take over human hearts. In order to do this, he starts a detective agency which specializes in the paranormal. Loki is assisted by his loyal companion Yamino and the pair are soon joined by a human girl named Mayura Daidouji who is manic for mysteries and often unwittingly assists him in catching the auras. As time passes, however, other Norse gods and characters appear; some befriend Loki and others are intent on assassinating him.

== Characters ==
Loki (ロキ, Roki)
Voiced by: Yuriko Fuchizaki (Japanese), Shannon Emerick (English)
Adult Form - Takahiro Sakurai (Japanese), Jose Diaz (English)
God of mischief (and in some versions chaos) in Norse mythology. Trapped in the body of a child, he seeks a way back to the realm of the gods and his original body. He is the father of Fenrir, Yamino (Jormungand), and Hel. He has red-brown hair and green eyes; he also has an aversion to deep water, as well as a possibly small case of amaxophobia, since he seems to hate riding in cars. (Or perhaps he simply becomes carsick.)
Loki has many romantic interests. In both series, Freyja loved him in the world of gods but he does not like her that way. Although in the anime, Loki is shown to be happy about Freya's feelings for him (Episode 13), ever since their initial confrontation where Loki learned of Freya's loneliness because of him. The youngest Norn Sister, Skuld, is also attracted to him mostly because of his kindness and beauty. Mayura seems to have romantic feelings towards him because of his courage, intelligence and concern for her. However, Mayura is the only one of these three who doesn't know Loki is actually an age old god, thus, her affection is somewhat unclear. Another quality of Loki is that his sense of foresight is quite remarkable, as he can usually figure things out way before anyone else does (though Yamino, Fenrir, and Ecchan figured out who Spica really was long before Loki did). Loki is more wild and silly in the manga than he is in the anime (his personality more befitting his body in the manga); also his relationship with Mayura is seen more clearly. He's obviously in love with Mayura.
Mayura Daidouji (大堂寺繭良, Daidōji Mayura; まゆら is used in place of 繭良 after her introduction.)
The main human character of the series: a pink-haired, red-eyed, 16-year-old, high school student obsessed with mysteries and the occult. Despite her love of mysteries, she never manages to find out who Loki is - partly because she has absolutely no sixth sense, despite being the daughter of a Shinto priest. Mayura also seems to have romantic feelings towards Loki near the end of the anime series. However it is shown unclearly in the manga, since she only knows him as a child. She does not believe in God because her mother died despite countless prayers. There are significant differences in her personality in the manga and anime. In the manga, Mayura is calmer, not shouting "Fushigi mystery!" (strange mystery) as often as she does in the anime and seems to have a sharper sense (being able to know Loki is "different" and wanting to ask him who or what he was in the seventeenth chapter).
Voiced by: Yui Horie (Japanese), Kira Vincent-Davis (English)
Yamino Ryusuke (闇野竜介, Yamino Ryūsuke; in the manga, various characters also address and refer to him as Megane (メガネ; i.e. "glasses" or "four-eyes"))
Loki's second son takes the form of a polite, bespectacled boy in his late teens, and serves as his housekeeper, cook, and assistant. He enjoys cooking, cleaning and other domestic activities, and in the anime, he also has an amusing addiction to ordering useless items from mail-order catalogs. His real name is Jormungand, also known as the Midgard serpent, since his true form is that of a giant serpent that encircles the Earth. Loki rescued Yamino from the bottom of the sea by casting a spell on him (thus giving him a human form) so that he could accompany his father on Earth; for this, he is eternally grateful. The revelation of Yamino's true identity occurs earlier in the manga than the anime, and seems to play more of a part in his characterization for the first manga series. He probably wears glasses as a reference to the Indian cobra (眼鏡蛇 meganehebi, or "glasses snake", in Japanese).
Voiced by: Shinichiro Miki (Japanese), Illich Guardiola (English)
Fenrir (フェンリル, Fenriru)
Loki's first son takes the form of a small black dog. His real identity is that of the Fenrisulfr, a giant wolf bound by the gods. Fenrir enjoys food and taunting Yamino. A running gag in both the anime and manga is how Fenrir can be very bossy and intentionally crude around Yamino, then instantly become the most affectionate and harmless puppy-son possible the moment "Daddy" walks in (during the series, he has an almost scary Father Complex. He's very outwardly protective of Loki, spouting threats when Loki may be in danger). While the gods can understand his words, it would appear that when a human hears him talk all they hear is a regular dog (though his barking sounds like he's singing).
Voiced by: Hirofumi Nojima (Japanese), John Swasey (English)
Hel (ヘル, Heru)
Loki's only daughter, Hel is the goddess of the underworld. Portrayed as an adolescent girl with wavy pink hair, green eyes and glasses, and a strong obsession with her father, though the nature of it differs between the manga and anime. In the anime, she is seen to be trying to kill Loki at first as Odin told her that Loki and her brothers no longer care for her and hated her, thus, making her wanting to make Loki experience the same kind of pain she experienced. In the manga, she wishes to kill her father so that he will always be with her in the underworld.
Voiced by: Omi Minami (Japanese), Rozie Curtis (English, ep 14), Taylor Hannah (English, eps 22+)
Narugami (鳴神, Narugami)
Actually the Norse God of thunder, Thor, in the form of a teenage boy with brown hair and eyes. He was sent to Earth from the realm of gods to kill Loki; in the manga, he doesn't remember this at first, while in the anime, he chooses not to kill Loki because he sees no reason to. Unfortunately, he forgot how to return to the realm of the gods, so he is forced to work a wide array of part-time jobs to support himself, which becomes another one of the series' recurring jokes. He always carries around a wooden sword, which is actually Thor's hammer Mjollnir in disguise. Loki addresses him as Narukami, itself a double pun on god (神 kami) and lightning (雷 kaminari), as clarified by Kinoshita in the second series.
Voiced by: Shotaro Morikubo (Japanese), Chris Patton (English)
Reiya Ohshima (大島玲也, Ōshima Reiya; , usually called Reiya (レイヤ); "Reya" is a spelling adopted by ADV Manga)
Reiya is a young girl with blue-violet eyes, brown hair and a cute crush on young Loki. In the anime, she is the sole survivor of a rich family killed in a car accident, and she hires Loki to solve a mystery about her mansion. In the manga, she hires Loki because she has been having unsettling dreams about her deceased sister Lisa; she lives with her aunt, uncle, and two older cousins. Reiya's true identity is the transmigrated Norse goddess Freyja—unlike Loki, however, Reiya's memory was wiped by Odin, so she has no memory of her past life. Reiya becomes Freyja when the necklace Brisingamen is put around her neck, but reverts to Reiya when the necklace is removed, with no memory of what happens while wearing it. Freyja, just like her alter ego, is enamored with Loki, though she's far more aggressive about it than Reiya. Reiya is also capable of becoming Freyja when extremely jealous or threatened, as well as other circumstances.
Voiced by: Rika Komatsu (Japanese), Brittney Karbowski (English)
Freyja (フレイヤ, Fureiya)
Freyja is the goddess of love and beauty. She loves Loki, but Loki does not return the feelings. Despite this, Freya refuses to give up and does everything she can to put Loki into situations where she can take advantage of him. When Loki was banished from the world of gods, Freyja begged Odin to let him return thus making Odin furious. Odin turned her into a child, Reiya, erased all her memories and sent her to the world of the mortals. She initially hated Loki for ignoring her and not reciprocating her feelings for him, and that she was lonely because of it. However, she learned to accept it and still refuses to give up on him. Thus, whenever she takes over Reiya, she aggressively pursues Loki and keeps others away from him, in particular Skuld.
Voiced by: Junko Asami (Japanese), Shelley Calene-Black (English)
Kazumi Higashiyama (Heimdall) (東山和実, Higashiyama Kazumi)
Heimdall is the god of light and the Guardian of the bridge that leads to Asgard (The Bifrost Bridge), sent by Odin to assassinate Loki, the watchman Heimdall takes the form of a young boy as a disguise. However, due to the theft of his right eye, he is forced to have neck-length purple hair that completely covers the right side of his face. His nails are actually long, sharp claws, so he wears bulky gloves to hide them. Because he is the god of strategy, he devises clever plans, such as control over other beings or even mirages to taunt the opponent. It's believed that if he and Loki clashed they would both die as the myth in Ragnarok portrayed it, so a serious confrontation is avoided until the end of the series, in which Loki convinces him that he may have lost his eye but gained a friend, the falcon that accompanied him. He believes Loki to be the thief that stole his eye, so in addition to carrying out the assassination order, he intends to retrieve his eye or avenge its loss by any means necessary. Although he is one of the more serious characters in the series, Heimdall is also the butt of many jokes. The manga frequently makes fun of his serious personality and his obsession with Loki, and even though "Kazumi Higashiyama" doesn't attend school, Heimdall still has a daily schedule consisting of piano lessons, singing lessons, and cram school. In the anime, Heimdall usually gets dragged along on shopping sprees by his roommate Freyr, much to his own dismay.
His name is very similar to Kinoshita's co-author in Tactics, Kazuko Higashiyama.
Voiced by: Romi Park (Japanese), Greg Ayres (English)
Mysterious Thief Freyr (怪盗フレイ, Kaitō Furei; sometimes translated as "Phantom Thief Freyr" and other variants.)
Freyr is Freyja's older brother and the god of fertility. He was brought to Earth to aid Heimdall in the destruction of Loki, but quickly drops that mission to search for Freyja once he realizes she is there, too. Somewhere along the line, he decides to get Loki's attention by becoming a master jewel thief; the natural enemy of any great detective. Impulsive and quixotic, Freyr seems to think of everything in terms of Romantic cliché, dramatic stereotypes, and absurd non sequiturs. His primary agenda is to find Freyja, or at least ensure that Loki isn't corrupting her. However, in the course of his plans, Freyr runs into Mayura, falls in love at first sight, and renames her Yamato Nadeshiko (大和撫子 Yamato Nadeshiko, a name for the prototypical ideal woman; a sort of Japanese Dulcinea), and in the English anime, his "Classic Japanese Beauty."
Voiced by: Takehito Koyasu (Japanese), Jason Douglas (English)
The Norn Sisters (ノルン, Norun)
Verdandi, Urd and Skuld are the goddesses of fate. In the manga, they are a bit ambiguous in their loyalties. Though they help Loki often, such as by giving him the magical ring Draupnir (which can be used to store evil spirits), they have plans of their own, separate from those of Odin and the other gods. Urd, in particular, is implied to be manipulating events on her own. In the anime, they have been sent to earth by Odin to kill Loki. Most of their attempts fall into the "Monster of the Week" pattern familiar to Super Sentai shows and magical girl/magical boy anime.
In the anime, there are many strong hints that Loki had an affair with Skuld in Asgard—an entire episode is even dedicated to this question—which could be the Norns' fuel for 'hating' and helping him. It is not known for sure though. In the manga, Skuld certainly has a crush on Loki, but there are no hints of anything more serious.
Voiced by: Verdandi - Mamiko Noto (Japanese), Tamara Levine (English)
Urd - Mariko Suzuki (Japanese), Kaytha Coker (English)
Skuld - Mai Nakahara (Japanese), Melissa Davis (English)
Odin (オーディン, Ōdin)
Odin is the King of the Gods. Odin is only referred to, never seen or interacted with, in the first series of the manga. In the second series, he is hinted at for a while with silhouettes and frames containing parts of his clothing, but eventually is seen unobscured. In the anime, he is only shown as a red eye, but also referred to with the emergence of two ravens that, if they appear together, stand for Huginn and Muninn, Odin's two messengers (see episode 1). Odin seeks to kill Loki, but is somehow unable to do so himself, so he sends assassins instead. He was the one who commanded Loki to take Heimdall's eye. Ironically, he is portrayed as an eye, the very part he gave to get ultimate knowledge.
Spica (スピカ, Supika)
Spica is the reincarnation of Angrboda, the giantess who bore three of Loki's children (the ones that were a precursor to Ragnarok). She is the mother of Fenrir, Jormungand, and Hel. In her human form, Spica is a normally mute girl with a HUGE appetite. In the anime she only appears briefly in the final episode.
Utgard-Loki (ウトガルドロキ, Utogarudo Roki)
Utgard Loki is the "other" Loki who held half of Loki's power— Loki identifies Utgard as his past self. He is the King of Utgard, Land of the Giants. When Urd killed Utgard Loki in the manga, Loki got his power back. He seems to have a strange obsession over Spica.
Koutaro Kakinouchi (垣ノ内光太郎, Kakinouchi Kōtarō)
A rich school boy and friend of Loki. In the anime he's a classmate of Mayura. He only appears in few episodes and is shown to be a ladies man, going after almost every pretty girl he sees.
Voiced by: Kōichi Tōchika (Japanese), Blake Shepard (English)
Misao Daidouji (大堂寺操, Daidōji Misao)
Misao Daidouji is the father of Mayura. He hates mystery and Loki but unlike his daughter, he can see some of the things that Loki summons. He is a minor character, except on episode four; My Dad's a Great Detective!?
Voiced by: Keiichi Sonobe (Japanese), John Gremillion (English)
Inspector Masumi Niiyama (新山真澄, Nīyama Masumi)
Masumi Niiyamais a police investigator who occasionally runs into Loki & the gang while on a case. He is friends with Misao Daidouji.
Voiced by: Keiichi Sonobe (Japanese), John Gremillion (English)

== Media ==
=== Manga ===
Japanese

- Kinoshita, Sakura (2003). Matantei Loki 1. Enix. ISBN 4-901926-53-5.
- Kinoshita, Sakura (2003). Matantei Loki 2. Enix. ISBN 4-901926-54-3.
- Kinoshita, Sakura (2003). Matantei Loki 3. Enix. ISBN 4-901926-55-1.
- Kinoshita, Sakura (2003). Matantei Loki 4. Enix. ISBN 4-901926-56-X.
- Kinoshita, Sakura (2003). Matantei Loki 5. Enix. ISBN 4-901926-57-8.
- Kinoshita, Sakura (2003). Matantei Loki 6. Enix. ISBN 4-901926-58-6.
- Kinoshita, Sakura (2003). Matantei Loki 7. Enix. ISBN 4-901926-59-4.
- Kinoshita, Sakura (2002). Matantei Loki RAGNAROK 1. Mag Garden. ISBN 4-901926-16-0.
- Kinoshita, Sakura (2003). Matantei Loki RAGNAROK 2. Mag Garden. ISBN 4-901926-39-X.
- Kinoshita, Sakura (2003). Matantei Loki RAGNAROK 3. Mag Garden. ISBN 4-901926-80-2.
- Kinoshita, Sakura (2004). Matantei Loki RAGNAROK 4. Mag Garden. ISBN 4-86127-031-6.
- Kinoshita, Sakura (2004). Matantei Loki RAGNAROK 5. Mag Garden. ISBN 4-86127-099-5.
- Kinoshita, Sakura (2003). The Mythical Detective Loki Ragnarok Perfect Guidebook. Mag Garden. ISBN 4-901926-83-7.

Limited Editions

These were often packaged with special extras, such as audio drama CDs or collectible figurines.

- Kinoshita, Sakura (2003). The Mythical Detective Loki Ragnarok 2 Limited Edition. Mag Garden. ISBN 4-901926-34-9.
- Kinoshita, Sakura (2003). The Mythical Detective Loki Ragnarok 3 Limited Edition. Mag Garden. ISBN 4-901926-84-5.
- Kinoshita, Sakura (2004). The Mythical Detective Loki Ragnarok 4 Limited Edition. Mag Garden. ISBN 4-86127-022-7.
- Kinoshita, Sakura (2004). The Mythical Detective Loki Ragnarok 5 Limited Edition. Mag Garden. ISBN 4-86127-094-4.

English (North American)

- Kinoshita, Sakura (2002). The Mythical Detective Loki Ragnarok 1. ADV Manga. ISBN 1-4139-0055-0.
- Kinoshita, Sakura (2003). The Mythical Detective Loki Ragnarok 2. ADV Manga. ISBN 1-4139-0184-0.
- Kinoshita, Sakura (2005). The Mythical Detective Loki Ragnarok 4. ADV Manga. ISBN 1-4139-0324-X.

English (Singapore)

- Kinoshita, Sakura. The Mythical Detective Loki 1. Chuang Yi. ISBN 981-260-453-7.
- Kinoshita, Sakura. The Mythical Detective Loki 2. Chuang Yi. ISBN 981-260-527-4.
- Kinoshita, Sakura. The Mythical Detective Loki 3. Chuang Yi. ISBN 981-260-602-5.
- Kinoshita, Sakura. The Mythical Detective Loki 4. Chuang Yi. ISBN 981-260-687-4.
- Kinoshita, Sakura. The Mythical Detective Loki 5.4. Chuang Yi. ISBN 981-260-747-1.
- Kinoshita, Sakura. The Mythical Detective Loki 6. Chuang Yi. ISBN 981-260-821-4.
- Kinoshita, Sakura. The Mythical Detective Loki 7. Chuang Yi. ISBN 981-260-917-2.
- Kinoshita, Sakura. The Mythical Detective Loki Ragnarok 1. Chuang Yi. ISBN 981-260-145-7.
- Kinoshita, Sakura. The Mythical Detective Loki Ragnarok 2. Chuang Yi. ISBN 981-260-210-0.
- Kinoshita, Sakura. The Mythical Detective Loki Ragnarok 3. Chuang Yi. ISBN 981-260-251-8.
- Kinoshita, Sakura. The Mythical Detective Loki Ragnarok 4. Chuang Yi. ISBN 981-260-251-8.
- Kinoshita, Sakura. The Mythical Detective Loki Ragnarok 5. Chuang Yi. ISBN 981-260-394-8.

=== Anime ===
==== Episode list ====
No.	Title	Original release date
1	"First Night - Demon Detective Appears"; Transliteration: "Matantei, Tōjō!" (Japanese: 魔探偵登場！)	April 5, 2003
Mayura Daidouji, is a girl is who is love with aliens and supernatural things. Once day in a clock tower, she finds a haunted and abandoned doll who talks and wants her to play with her. She agrees and brings her back home. Soon a black cat takes away the doll, and she comes upon the Enjaku Detective Agency. She walks into the agency and meets the handsome man Yamino who she thought was the detective, but the real detective was a small boy named Loki. She asks him to find a doll, but sent her out. Although she was sent out he went looking for the doll anyway, and meets her at the tower. They then fight the haunted doll and revives the truth that she was not abandoned. Back at the agency she declares herself the new helper of the business.
2	"Second Night - The Allies of Justice are Totally Broke?!"; Transliteration: "Seiki no Mikata chō Binbō!?" (Japanese: せいきの味方超ビンボー!?)	April 12, 2003
During a festival held in Mayura's school, Loki came to visit Mayura and Yamino who came to help her in order to recruit members for her club. Due to lack of members in her club, Loki was unfortunately dragged along to follow her on the 7 Mysteries of the school tour. Proving that 6 out of 7 are not mysteries, Mayura brought Loki to see The Wandering Armour at her school entrance which proved to be real. Eventually, Loki defeated the Armour with the help of a transfer student, Narugami who at the end is revealed that he is Thor, God of Thunder who's currently living in poverty and taking up part-time jobs.
3	"Third Night - The Descending Assassin"; Transliteration: "Maiorita Shikaku!" (Japanese: 舞い降りた刺客!)	April 19, 2003
The Enjaku Detective Agency now is against a mysterious case with angry birds attacking people in the zoo. Mayura decides to plan everything and takes everyone to the zoo, including the zookeeper for the birds. She forgets about her mission and looks at all of the animals while Loki and Yamino rests. She then bumps into Narugami who is working in an anteater costume. Then they all leave for the bird cage, leaving Narugami behind. A mysterious bird comes swooping down and hypnotizes Mayura. Later Loki figures out that a Nordic god named Heimdall sets up the trap and hypnotized the zookeeper as well to get Mayura to lure Loki in. After solving the case, they return to the agency and Heimdall kisses Mayura and the episode ends.
4	"Fourth Night - Papa was a Famous Detective!?"; Transliteration: "Papa wa Meitantei!?" (Japanese: パパ は名探偵！？)	April 26, 2003
Mayura's father thinks that all of the mystery junk she always talked about is useless and is bad for her. He wants her to stop going on detective adventures. To help her solve her problems between Mayura and her dad, Loki used his powers to bring them both back to their memories of 10 years ago. As their memories revealed that her dad told her that he was a "detective" when she was younger, Mayura remembered it was because of him that she loved mysteries which led to an understand at the end.
5	"Fifth Night - Kaitou Frey's Challenge"; Transliteration: "Kaitō Furei no Chōsen!" (Japanese: 怪盗フレイの挑戦！)	May 3, 2003
A new god appears, Frey (Frey), as a thief. He steals many things and Loki has no interest in the robberies until he discovers that Frey is also going to steal the Briggsamen necklace. Frey challenges Loki to stop him. Loki goes to meet him when Frey steals the necklace, but is unable to stop him. We learn that Freya is his sister, and that she may be on Earth.
6	"Sixth Night - A Girl Under Attack"; Transliteration: "Nerawareta Shōjo" (Japanese: ねらわれた少女)	May 10, 2003
A Girl Under Attack, A mysterious young girl named Reya shows up on Loki's doorstep asking for help. She claims that, at night, the furniture has been moving on its own and she's been hearing footsteps. However, upon speaking to the head butler, we learn that no such happenings have occurred. Is this girl's story fabricated? Meanwhile, Heimdall is lurking in the shadows, and that's never a good sign...
7	"Seventh Night - Goddess Freya, Awaken!"; Transliteration: "Megami Fureiya, Kakusei!" (Japanese: 女神フレイや、覚醒！)	May 17, 2003
Loki and Thor rush off to find Freya, on their way they reunite with Yamino and an unconscious Mayura, who fell while trying to catch up with them. They gang find themselves in an aquarium and Loki sees sea otters for the first time. They later find a fearful Freya, but Loki senses darkness in her...
8	"Eighth Night - On wards!! Yamino Detective Agency"; Transliteration: "Susume!! Yamino Tanteisha!?" (Japanese: 進め！！闇野探偵社！？)	May 24, 2003
Loki is abducted by two bank robbers on the street who kidnap him after he discovers their true identities. Thanks to an earlier conversation between Mayura and Yamino, Loki decides to let them come and rescue him, rather than getting himself out of the situation on his own. He leaves them several clues and Mayura and Yamino hurry to find him before something bad happens. There is also a reference to Yamino's true nature--as Loki's Son!
9	"Ninth Night - Mayura's Way to Certain Victory in the Ceremonial Test!?"; Transliteration: "Mayura Shiki Tesuto Hisshō-hō!?" (Japanese: 繭良式テスト必勝法！？)	May 31, 2003
On his way back home, Frey accidentally drops a red jewel in a park. The jewel grows into a tree, and the rumor spreads that this tree grants wishes if you pluck a leaf. Meanwhile, Mayura and Narugami learn that if they fail their next tests, then they will be required to take summer classes. Both come across the tree and take a leaf. When Mayura shows her leaf to Loki, he destroys it and forbids her to go to the park. That night, Loki and Yamino dispel the tree, changing it back to a jewel that Mayura picks up. Later, Narugami visits Loki's house as part of another part-time job and shows Loki his leaf, making Loki realize the tree is still alive.
10	"Tenth Night - Evening Coffee House"; Transliteration: "Yūgure Kōhī-kan" (Japanese: 夕暮珈琲館)	June 7, 2003
Loki, Yamino, and Mayura find an excellent coffee house that has mysteriously become vacant. The group makes an effort to make it popular again, but just when they do, strange things start happening again. What could be behind it?
11	"Eleventh Night - Transfer Student in Love"; Transliteration: "Koisuru Tenkōsei." (Japanese: 恋する転校生。)	June 14, 2003
Mayura is distraught. She finds that if she doesn't get more members for her Mystery club, it's going to be shut down for good. The director claims her club is a waste of time and money, and she hasn't even found one single true mystery. Mayura mentions this to Frey, (who, as seen in earlier episodes, adores her,) and he's more than eager to help. But when he starts to dip into Heimdall's stash of magic 'tricks' to conjure up a mystery for the director, it doesn't take a genius to know that things are going to get messy...
12	"Twelfth Night - The Trap of Dracula's Castle"; Transliteration: "Dorakyura-jō no Wana" (Japanese: ドラキュラ城の罠)	June 21, 2003
Loki must go into a virtual reality game to save his friends that are stuck inside. The game taps into the player's subconscious and uses the people close to them. Enemies in the game are destroyed by destroying the red jewel that they wear. In the end a monster from the world of the Gods is in control. Loki defeats it and they are back to reality.
13	"Thirteenth Night - Flower of Illusion"; Transliteration: "Mugen no Hana" (Japanese: 夢幻の花)	June 28, 2003
Loki is transformed into his original form, and tries to enjoy it by taking a walk around town, only to encounter his friends. He soon realizes that him turning into his original form was caused by an evil plant that he later destroys, turning him into his child form once again.
14	"Fourteenth Night - Light Dog, Dark Dog, and Black Dog"; Transliteration: "Hikari to Yami to Kuroi inu" (Japanese: 光と闇と黒い犬)	July 5, 2003
Mayura finally decides to get the one thing she's sure will help transform her into the ultimate mystery solver; a dog! When sets out to find one, a puppy literally falls out of the blue and at her feet. But this black pup probably won't be sniffing out criminals any time soon... or will he? This new dog isn't all he appears to be... Meanwhile, Loki's investigating mysterious blackouts that are occurring over town. How are the blackouts and the black dog connected?
15	"Fifteenth Night - Beautiful Assassins"; Transliteration: "Utsukushiki Shikaku-tachi" (Japanese: 美しき刺客たち)	July 12, 2003
A new fortune-telling trio enters town, and, predictably, Mayura is excited. She attempts to drag the group along, even showing them a poster she found about the fortune tellers, but in the end she heads out alone. It becomes clear, however, that the Fortune tellers may not be Fortune tellers at all, especially when the poster Mayura brought over turns into a demon familiar. Can Loki and the gang save Mayura from this danger, or is it already too late?
16	"Sixteenth Night - Demonic Bell"; Transliteration: "Mashō no Suzu" (Japanese: 魔性の鈴)	July 19, 2003
There's going to be a wedding at Mayura's temple soon, and the gang is invited. However, Verdandi (one of the Norns) has something up her sleeve. Will the wedding day be tarnished, or can Loki and his friends pull through?
17	"Seventeenth Night - Kitchen Sanctuary"; Transliteration: "Gekitotsu! Kitchin Sankuchuari" (Japanese: 激突！！ キッチンサンクチュアリ)	July 26, 2003
Mayura, Narugami, and Yamino are invited onto a kitchen competition, competing against Heimdall and friends. However, the invitation is a trick by Skuld to kill Loki.
18	"The Seven-Colored Detective Appears!"; Transliteration: "Nana iro Tantei Arawaru!?" (Japanese: 七色探偵現る！？)	August 2, 2003
Loki and company receive a letter sending them to an abandoned house. When they find a laughing box, the others are quick to dismiss it as a prank. Loki isn't so sure, and winds up coming in contact with a cursed mirror that causes him to take on the personalities of those near him.
19	"Narugami-kun's Pure-hearted Story"; Transliteration: "Narukami-kun junjō Monogatari" (Japanese: 鳴神君純情物語)	August 9, 2003
Verdandi gives Loki another prophecy. Narugami loses a fast food job, and gains a teaching position at a swordfighting dojo, where he starts a relationship with the owner's daughter. However, Narugami's new girlfriend seems to be playing into Verdandi's plans.
20	"Red Shoes"; Transliteration: "Akai Kutsu" (Japanese: 赤い靴)	August 16, 2003
The Norn sisters discuss their strategy regarding Loki and decide to go after Reya. When Reya shows up at Loki's mansion to thank him for the new boots she received, she goes out of control and attempts to kill Loki. It is later revealed that the boots Reya was wearing was given to her by the Norns and were controlling her actions. Meanwhile, Skuld repeatedly runs into Loki while spying and starts questioning the mission the sisters have.
21	"The Dawn of Heimdall"; Transliteration: "Akatsukino e Imadaru" (Japanese: 暁のへイマダル)	August 23, 2003
Odin gives Heimdall a gift of a powerful eye. Heimdall then sets out to destroy Loki unless he returns Heimdall's right eye. Heimdall is full of hatred and sets out to use the power of the eye beyond its limits.
22	"The Truth About the Goddesses"; Transliteration: "Megami-tachi no Shinjitsu" (Japanese: 女神たちの真実)	August 30, 2003
Loki wants to talk to the Norns but first he must survive their crazy house!
23	"The Summer Girl Beside the Lake"; Transliteration: "Kohan no Natsu Shōjo" (Japanese: 湖畔の夏少女)	September 6, 2003
On a trip to the lake in search of summer fun, Loki might get more than he expected.
24	"The Shadow of Loneliness"; Transliteration: "Kodoku no Kage" (Japanese: 孤独の陰影(かげ))	September 13, 2003
Mayura, suspicious of Loki, investigates his house while he and the other gods have a picnic. Unfortunately, she is involved in Hel's evil plans…
25	"End of the Dream"; Transliteration: "Yume no Shūchakueki" (Japanese: 夢の終着駅)	September 20, 2003
When Hel kidnaps Yamino, Ecchan and Fenrir, Loki is forced into action. He and the goddess of the underworld embark on a strange journey on a train car…but will it end victoriously for Loki or will he perish in Hel's flames?
26	"The Departure of the Gods"; Transliteration: "Kamigami no Tabidachi" (Japanese: 神々の旅立ち)	September 27, 2003
The assassins have stopped attacking Loki and now he is free to return to the world of the gods. The only thing stopping him is Mayura. Can he bear to return to the world of the gods and leave her?
