= List of Tactics episodes =

Tactics (タクティクス, Takutikusu) is a Japanese anime series with 25 episodes. Hiroshi Watanabe directed the series and was produced by Studio Deen. Tactics was licensed and distributed by Manga Entertainment for its English release. Tactics is based on the manga with the same name, and follows the life of Kantarou, a man who can see youkai, Haruka, a demon-eating tengu, and Youko, a kitsune. When he was young, Kantarou was ostracized for his ability to see mythical beasts and youkai; for this reason, he decided to seek out the legendary demon-eating tengu to make himself stronger. Kantarou succeeds and names him Haruka, therefore becoming his master. The plot of the series revolves around the various jobs and adventures that, Kantarou, Haruka, and Yoko, three paranormal investigators, have and Haruka's struggle with his returning memories.

Tactics originally aired on TV Tokyo between October 5, 2004, and March 29, 2005. In the United States, it was featured on the Ani-Monday program from January 7, 2008, to April 21, 2008, on the Sci Fi Channel. The opening theme for Tactics was Secret World and the ending theme was "Mienai Chikara" (ミエナイチカラ, Invisible Strength). Both were sung by Miki Akiyama, composed and arranged by Kazuya Nishioka, and lyrics written by Yuriko Mori. The series was first released on DVD in English on June 27, 2006. A total of 5 DVDs were released, each containing 5 episodes apiece. On February 12, 2008, a box set with all 5 of the DVDs was released. In Japan, seven DVD volumes were released. In the US, the company Starz began offering Tactics episodes on the Apple iTunes Store.

== Episode list ==
No.	Title	Original release date	English release date
1	"The Black Goblin Awakes"; Transliteration: "Kuro Tengu Kakusei" (Japanese: 黒天狗覚醒)	October 5, 2004	January 7, 2008
On his way to a temple in the Japanese countryside, Kantaro discovers the resting place of the demon-eating goblin. Kantaro successfully releases the creature and names him Haruka, becoming his master. Together, they must hurry to save a young noble woman from a creature known as the Icicle Woman.
2	"Bizarre Love at Yoshimara's"; Transliteration: "Yoshimara Kaiki Bojō" (Japanese: 吉原怪奇慕情)	October 12, 2004	January 7, 2008
Kantaro and Haruka travel to Yoshiwara to investigate odd happenings. While there, Kantaro befriends Kosume, a courtesan haunted by a dark secret.
3	"Mountain Fairy Tale"; Transliteration: "Yama no Dōwa" (Japanese: 山の童話)	October 19, 2004	January 14, 2008
Kantaro's band of supernatural adventurers head to the mountains for a vacation. The team springs into action when they discover the children of the village are disappearing. The disappearances are blamed on the region's God of the Mountain, and the group quickly departs to defeat him.
4	"The Forbidden Portrait"; Transliteration: "Kindan no Shōzō" (Japanese: 禁断の肖像)	October 26, 2004	January 14, 2008
In the woods of Japan, a mysterious photographer traps the soul of the young women in pictures he takes of them. Kantaro's search for the photographer becomes desperate when he traps Reiko's soul in a portrait.
5	"Dancer in the Darkness"; Transliteration: "Yami ni Mau Mono" (Japanese: 闇に舞う者)	November 2, 2004	January 21, 2008
Kantaro returns home to visit and old friend, Yumeyako. However, Yumeyako's client, the famous doll-maker Shinsuburo, has a dark secret; he wishes to transfer Yumeyako's essence to one of his dolls.
6	"The Ghost Trolley"; Transliteration: "Gogo Kuji Shichibu Hatsu Yūrei Densha" (Japanese: 午後九時七分発 幽霊電車)	November 9, 2004	January 21, 2008
Six months after a horrific accident, a ghost trolley appears in a small village. The supernatural detectives investigate and meet Nene, a young girl who may hold the secret to the mysterious ghost trolley.
7	"A Seductive Beckoning"; Transliteration: "Kowaku no Yobigoe" (Japanese: 蠱惑の呼び声)	November 16, 2004	January 28, 2008
When a daughter of a wealthy family disappears from Asakusa, Haruka and Kantaro are called into action. However, the two are constantly bickering, making it difficult to proceed with the case and discover the secret of Lord Katsuragi and the Katsuragi Society.
8	"A Foxy Lady"; Transliteration: "Yō Kitsune Teki Kanojo" (Japanese: 妖狐的彼女)	November 23, 2004	January 28, 2008
Yoko keeps the Ichinomiya household running. She cooks, cleans, and washes for Kantaro and the other monsters, with little reward. After Kantaro and Haruka devour a treat she was saving for later, Yoko decides to move out of the house.
9	"The Strange Tale of Bride Island"; Transliteration: "Yome Shima Kaiki Tan" (Japanese: 嫁島怪奇譚)	November 30, 2004	February 11, 2008
On Bride Island, people are turning into skeletons overnight. Professor Numata asks Kantaro and his college rival and supernatural skeptic Hasumi to investigate.
10	"Will of the Winds, Part 1"; Transliteration: "Kaze no Gen Reizen Hen" (Japanese: 風ノ言霊 前編)	December 7, 2004	February 11, 2008
In part one of a two-part adventure, Kantaro, Haruka, and the team attempt to solve the mysterious deaths on the eve of Suzuku Village's Festival of the Wind.
11	"Will of the Winds, Part 2"; Transliteration: "Kaze no Gen Rei Kōhen" (Japanese: 風ノ言霊 後編)	December 14, 2004	February 18, 2008
In part two, Kantaro and Haruka discover the cause behind the mysterious deaths in Suzuku Village is closer to home than they feared.
12	"Of Roses and Goblins"; Transliteration: "Bara to Tengu" (Japanese: 薔薇と天狗)	December 21, 2004	February 18, 2008
After the female president of a trading company hires the team to solve her ghost problem, her gaze turns to Haruka. However, her intentions remain unclear.
13	"Woodland Nightmare"; Transliteration: "Jukai no Akumu" (Japanese: 樹海の悪夢)	December 28, 2004	February 25, 2008
An army unit disappears after their discovery of a missing battleship deep in the dense forest. Kantarou is hired to solve the mystery and encounter trap to ensnare Haruka.
14	"The Woman Who Loved Books"; Transliteration: "Hon o Itoshi ta Onna" (Japanese: 本を愛した女)	January 11, 2005	February 25, 2008
Kantaro's editor, Reiko, becomes possessed after she is absorbed into an ancient book in the archives. The team's tactics must be much more subtle in their tactics to save her.
15	"The Fading Song of Summer Cicadas"; Transliteration: "Kure Yuku Natsu no Semi Shigure" (Japanese: 暮れゆく夏の蝉時雨)	January 18, 2005	March 3, 2008
Suzu's memories trigger a series of unusual events. As everyone disappears, Suzu must decide whether the world is truly reality or if she really is stuck inside a dream.
16	"O, Lamentations for the Married Couple"; Transliteration: "Aa, Fūfu Aika" (Japanese: 嗚呼, 夫婦哀歌)	January 25, 2005	March 3, 2008
Kantaro faces the spirit of a servant-girl-turned-mistress that haunts the home of her previous employers.
17	"The Pretty Little Girl From England"; Transliteration: "Eikokushiki Bishōjo" (Japanese: 英国式美少女)	February 1, 2005	March 10, 2008
A pretty little girl, Rosalie, visiting from England has strange connections to the local haunted church.
18	"The Paranormal Research Society"; Transliteration: "Makafushigi Kenkyūkai" (Japanese: 摩訶不思議研究会)	February 8, 2005	March 10, 2008
Kantarou's arch-rival, Hasumi, creates the Paranormal Research Society to prove through science that monsters do not exist.
19	"Maple-Colored Love"; Transliteration: "Momiji-iro no Koi" (Japanese: 紅葉色の恋)	February 15, 2005	March 24, 2008
Yoko meets a new potential love interest and starts to work at his fabric shop. However, a spiritual presence at the shop will not allow Yoko to ruin tradition.
20	"The Teller of Demonic Tales"; Transliteration: "Musumegidayū Onigatari" (Japanese: 娘義太夫 鬼がたり)	February 22, 2005	March 24, 2008
Kantaro meets a folksinger who tells tales of a demon-eating goblin, and with it summons multiple demons that Haruka and Kantaro must face.
21	"The Door to Memory"; Transliteration: "Kioku no Tobira" (Japanese: 記憶の扉)	March 1, 2005	April 7, 2008
A fun trip to the city takes a dangerous turn when possessed Rosalie unleashes the true goblin sealed within Haruka.
22	"Blue Eyes"; Transliteration: "Aoki Me" (Japanese: 蒼き眼)	March 8, 2005	April 7, 2008
With Haruka's mind thrown into chaos, an ominous rift develops between Kantaro and the troubled demon eater.
23	"A Snowy Landscape of Glass"; Transliteration: "Garasu no Yuki Kei" (Japanese: 硝子の雪景)	March 15, 2005	April 14, 2008
Haruka's sudden disappearance has everyone concerned. However, Kantaro search for his friend leads Yoko into a dangerous trap.
24	"A Long Lost Heart"; Transliteration: "Kokoro Haruka ni" (Japanese: こころ遥かに)	March 22, 2005	April 14, 2008
The transformation of The Black Goblin is almost complete, leading to a brutal and shocking battle.
25	"Unseen Power"; Transliteration: "Mienai Chikara" (Japanese: ミエナイチカラ)	March 29, 2005	April 21, 2008
A tragic passing and a dark secret both come to light as Haruka and Kantaro make the decision that decides their fates forever. It took place six months after the battle, Everyone is depressed, especially Kantarou and Suzu. Suzu always came to their house to play with Yoko and Rosalie. One day, Viscount Edogawa came and seek help from Kantarou, there had been a "Strange Phenomenon" again in their house. It is revealed that Suzu died and "Her Spirit" is the one who is with Yoko and Rosalie. She died on the same day, the battle ends, because of a fever. Kantarou tried to exorcise her but failed. He then, put charms around their house that will make them invisible to Suzu, but Yoko cannot take it anymore and said that Kantarou is only running away. Kanatarou visits his childhood friend, he got advice and decided to do exorcise Suzu now. At the same time, Haruka went to Suzu's house with the gift she gave him. Suzu and Haruka talked about many things like how she was thankful for being able to meet them and make memories. It is revealed that she had a weak body so she was given a gentle care which she hate very much. When they faced – off, it is revealed that Kantarou is a descendant of the one who sealed Haruka and that is why Haruka feel that he is not to be trusted but as the time pass, he is hurt not because of his lost memories but because Kantarou look likes the one who sealed him. After some talk, Haruka asked if he is still welcome to return to Kanatarou. Suzu made her appearance, she gave her bottle to Haruka and said that she was glad that they made up. After that she glowed and started to disappear. It is revealed that she is not able to pass on because she wants Kanatarou and Haruka to reconcile and not because of her feelings toward Haruka.
