= Dragon Sister! =

Japanese manga adaptation of Romance of the Three Kingdoms

- Cover of volume one.

DRAGON SISTER! -三國志 百花繚乱- (Dragon Sister! Sangokushi Hyakkaryōran)
- Genre: Adventure, Comedy
- Manga
- Written by: Nini
- Published by: Mag Garden
- English publisher: Tokyopop
- Magazine: Comic Blade Masamune
- Original run: December 10, 2002 – July 30, 2008
- Volumes: 6

Dragon Sister! (DRAGON SISTER! -三國志 百花繚乱-) is a Japanese manga adaptation by Nini of the 14th century novel Romance of the Three Kingdoms by Luo Guanzhong. It was published in Comic Blade Masamune and was licensed by Tokyopop.

== Volumes ==
Dragon Sister! was published in Mag Garden Comic Blade Masamune magazine from December 10, 2002, to July 30, 2008, and was collected into six volumes in Japan from July 2004 to October 2008. Tong Li Publishing published the series in Taiwan from August 2005 to December 2008. Tokyopop published two volumes in English in April and August 2008.

No.	Original release date	Original ISBN	English release date	English ISBN
1	9 July 2004	9784861270581	8 April 2008	9781427805256
2	10 November 2005	9784861272158	5 August 2008	9781427805263
3	9 September 2006	9784861273148		—
4	10 September 2007	9784861274213		—
5	10 May 2008	9784861274992		—
6	10 October 2008	9784861275364		—

== Reception ==
"The manga Dragon Sister! has an immediately engaging sense of fun and adventure. That it is overflowing with attractive women certainly doesn’t hurt, that the women are intelligent and effective fighters and war leaders makes it all the more irresistible." — Holly Ellingwood, activeAnime. "If you're attracted to the image of the cute girl in the suggestive outfit on the cover, you're going to be happy with the character designs and the artwork throughout the book itself. If, however, you're looking for a different take on one of history's most-told tales, this is certainly a worthy title to check out." — A. E. Sparrow, IGN. "The beginning chapters are too strong for the book to be an outright failure; but for the book to turn away from its strengths the way it does can make for more frustrating reading than something that's simply dull." — Ben Leary, Mania. "Strictly for the fanservice crowd; others are advised to look elsewhere for more enlightened tales of female empowerment." — Katherine Dacey, Pop Culture Shock.

== See also ==
- List of media adaptations of Romance of the Three Kingdoms
