= Kohaku no Yume de Yoimashō =

Japanese manga series

- First tankōbon volume cover

琥珀の夢で酔いましょう
- Genre: Gourmet
- Manga
- Written by: Masoho Murano; Kei Sugimura (supervision)
- Illustrated by: Nodoka Yoda
- Published by: Mag Garden
- Magazine: Monthly Comic Garden
- Original run: October 5, 2018 – present
- Volumes: 9
- icon

Kohaku no Yume de Yoimashō (Japanese: 琥珀の夢で酔いましょう; lit. 'Amber Days and Golden Nights') is a Japanese manga series written by Masoho Murano, illustrated by Nodoka Yoda and supervised by Kei Sugimura. It began serialization in Mag Garden's shōnen manga magazine Monthly Comic Garden in October 2018.

== Publication ==
Written by Masoho Murano, illustrated by Nodoka Yoda and supervised by Kei Sugimura, Kohaku no Yume de Yoimashō began serialization in Mag Garden's shōnen manga magazine Monthly Comic Garden on October 5, 2018. After the magazine published its final issue on March 5, 2026, the series will resume serialization on the Mag Comi website. Its chapters have been compiled into nine tankōbon volumes as of January 2026.

No.	Release date	ISBN
1	April 12, 2019	978-4-8000-0845-9
2	January 14, 2020	978-4-8000-0931-9
3	September 14, 2020	978-4-8000-1013-1
4	July 14, 2021	978-4-8000-1112-1
5	April 14, 2022	978-4-8000-1197-8
6	March 14, 2023	978-4-8000-1310-1
7	February 14, 2024	978-4-8000-1422-1
8	October 11, 2024	978-4-8000-1511-2
9	January 14, 2026	978-4-8000-1692-8

== Reception ==
The series was nominated for the seventh Next Manga Awards in 2021 in the print category and was ranked 20th. The series was nominated for the eighth edition of the same award in 2022 in the same category and was ranked 17th.
