= Night of the Living Cat =

Japanese manga series

- First tankōbon volume cover

ニャイト・オブ・ザ・リビングキャット (Nyaito obu za Ribingu Kyatto)
- Genre: Comedy horror; Post-apocalyptic
- Manga
- Written by: Hawkman
- Illustrated by: Mecha-Roots
- Published by: Mag Garden
- English publisher: NA: Seven Seas Entertainment
- Magazine: Monthly Comic Garden
- Original run: October 5, 2020 – present
- Volumes: 8
- Anime television series
- Directed by: Takashi Miike (chief); Tomohiro Kamitani
- Written by: Shingo Irie
- Music by: Kōji Endō
- Studio: OLM Division 1
- Licensed by: Crunchyroll
- Original network: TV Tokyo, BS TV Tokyo
- English network: SEA: Animax Asia
- Original run: July 8, 2025 – September 23, 2025
- Episodes: 12
- icon

Night of the Living Cat (Japanese: ニャイト・オブ・ザ・リビングキャット, Hepburn: Nyaito obu za Ribingu Kyatto), also known as Nyaight of the Living Cat, is a Japanese manga series written by Hawkman and illustrated by Mecha-Roots. It has been serialized in Mag Garden's Monthly Comic Garden since October 2020. An anime television series adaptation produced by OLM aired from July to September 2025 on TV Tokyo.

== Premise ==
A mysterious virus has spread that causes people to transform into cats when they cuddle with the feline animals. The protagonist, Kunagi, must fight his urge to snuggle with cats in order to survive this bizarre and crazy world.

== Characters ==
Kunagi (クナギ)
Voiced by: Masaaki Mizunaka (Japanese); Jason Douglas (English)
Kaoru (カオル)
Voiced by: Reina Ueda (Japanese); Maria Delilah (English)
Arata (アラタ)
Voiced by: Reiji Kawashima
Tsutsumi (ツツミ)
Voiced by: Yū Serizawa
Ren (レン)
Voiced by: Subaru Kimura (Japanese); Nick Huber (English)
Masaki (マサキ)
Voiced by: Yoshiki Nakajima (Japanese); Reagan Murdock (English)
Tanishi (タニシ)
Voiced by: Hiroki Yasumoto (Japanese); Lew Temple, Sara Ragsdale (cat) (English)
Gaku (ガク)
Voiced by: Ryōta Takeuchi (Japanese); Ben Bryant (English)
Grandma (グランマ, Guranma)
Voiced by: Tomoko Miyadera
Keisuke (ケイスケ)
Voiced by: Kazuyuki Okitsu
Suō (スオウ)
Voiced by: Atsumi Tanezaki
Mitsuru (ミツル)
Voiced by: Satoshi Tsuruoka
Kōji (コウジ)
Voiced by: Hiroshi Naka
Gunslinger (ガンスリンガー, Gansuringā)
Voiced by: Toshiyuki Morikawa
Last Samurai (ラストサムライ, Rasuto Samurai)
Voiced by: TBA
Cat Language Translating Machine (翻訳機, Honyaku-ki)
Voiced by: Tesshō Genda

== Media ==
=== Manga ===
Written by Hawkman and illustrated by Mecha-Roots, Night of the Living Cat started in Mag Garden's Monthly Comic Garden on October 5, 2020. Its chapters have been collected into individual tankōbon volumes, with the first one released on May 10, 2021. As of August 7, 2026, eight volumes have been released.

In North America, the manga has been licensed for English release by Seven Seas Entertainment.

==== Volumes ====
No.	Original release date	Original ISBN	English release date	English ISBN
1	May 10, 2021	978-4-8000-1087-2	October 4, 2022	978-1-63858-581-7
2	February 22, 2022	978-4-8000-1181-7	January 3, 2023	978-1-63858-754-5
3	November 10, 2022	978-4-8000-1264-7	October 3, 2023	978-1-63858-920-4
4	July 10, 2023	978-4-8000-1351-4	June 11, 2024	979-8-88843-122-1
5	February 22, 2024	978-4-8000-1427-6	October 22, 2024	979-8-89160-649-4
6	February 21, 2025	978-4-8000-1557-0	September 30, 2025	979-8-89373-265-8
7	July 10, 2025	978-4-8000-1615-7	June 9, 2026	979-8-89765-516-8
8	August 7, 2026	978-4-8000-1791-8	—	—

=== Anime ===
On February 22, 2024 (National Cat Day), an anime television series adaptation was announced. The series was produced by OLM with Slow Curve and Sony Pictures Television (SPT) handling planning and production. The series was directed by Tomohiro Kamitani, with Takashi Miike serving as chief director, Shingo Irie in charge of the series scripts, Takao Maki in charge of character designs, music composed by Kōji Endō, and narration by Shigeru Chiba. The series aired from July 8 to September 23, 2025, on TV Tokyo and BS TV Tokyo. (Note: TV Tokyo listed the series air dates on Monday at 26:00, which is effectively Tuesday at 2:00 a.m. JST.) The opening theme song is "Cat City", performed by The Yellow Monkey, while the ending theme song is "Matatabi", performed by Wanima. The series also features an insert song titled "Nyaight of the Living Cat" (ニャイト・オブ・ザ・リビングキャット, Nyaito obu za Ribingu Kyatto), performed by Endō, featuring Marty Friedman and Heidi Shepherd.

The series is streamed by Crunchyroll in the Americas, the UK, Europe, the Middle East, Africa, Oceania, and CIS, while SPT handles distribution in Asia-Pacific.

==== Episodes ====
No.	Title	Directed by	Written by	Storyboarded by	Chief animation directed by	Original release date
1	"Everything Becomes Cat"; Transliteration: "Subete ga Neko ni Naru" (Japanese: すべてが猫になる)	Takafumi Hino	Shingo Irie	Tomohiro Kamitani	Toshiya Yamada	July 8, 2025
2	"Tonight the Cats Steal the Stars"; Transliteration: "Koyoi Nekora Hoshi o Ubau" (Japanese: 今宵ねこら星を奪う)	Sōta Kawano & Masahito Otani	Shingo Irie	Norio Nitta	Akane Hirota, Yasukazu Shōji, Taka Satō & Mai Kuwabara	July 15, 2025
3	"Cats in Prison"; Transliteration: "Neko no Rōgoku" (Japanese: 猫の牢獄)	Nozomi Ishii	Shigeru Murakoshi	Akira Nishimori	Akane Hirota, Yuri Abe, Yasukazu Shōji, Taka Satō, Hitomi Kōno & Mai Kuwabara	July 22, 2025
4	"The Cat Is a Harsh Master"; Transliteration: "Neko wa Mujihina Sekai no Ō" (Japanese: 猫は無慈悲な世界の王)	Oota Akiko	Shigeru Murakoshi & Shingo Irie	Hiroaki Yoshikawa	Nagisa Takahashi	July 29, 2025
5	"Cat Max"; Transliteration: "Kyatto Makkusu" (Japanese: キャットマックス)	Yasuhiro Noda	Shingo Irie	Noriaki Saitō	Tomoaki Sakiyama	August 5, 2025
6	"Cat Rising"; Transliteration: "Kyatto Raijingu" (Japanese: キャットライジング)	Takafumi Hino	Shigeru Murakoshi	Takeshi Mori	Nagisa Takahashi	August 12, 2025
7	"The Feline D-REX from Another World"; Transliteration: "Yūsei kara no Neko D-REX" (Japanese: 遊星からの猫D-REX)	Kenya Kodama	Shingo Irie	Shigeru Murakoshi	Toshiya Yamada	August 19, 2025
8	"Nyarmageddon"; Transliteration: "Nyarumagedon" (Japanese: ニャルマゲドン)	Kentaro Mizuno	Shigeru Murakoshi	Noriaki Saitō	Toshiya Yamada & Nagisa Takahashi	August 26, 2025
9	"Commeowndo"; Transliteration: "Konyankō" (Japanese: コニャンコー)	Yoshihiko Iwata	Shingo Irie	Hiroaki Yoshikawa	Nagisa Takahashi	September 2, 2025
10	"Norwegian d'Arc"; Transliteration: "Noruwējannu Daruku" (Japanese: ノルウェージャンヌ・ダルク)	Michita Shiraishi	Shigeru Murakoshi	Takeshi Mori	Nagisa Takahashi & Toshiya Yamada	September 9, 2025
11	"Transformeows"; Transliteration: "Toransufōmyā" (Japanese: トランスフォーミャー)	Kenya Kodama	Shingo Irie	Noriaki Saitō	Toshiya Yamada	September 16, 2025
12	"Meow Am Legend"; Transliteration: "Ai Myā Rejeneko" (Japanese: アイ・ミャウ・レジェネコ)	Takafumi Hiro	Shingo Irie	Hiroaki Yoshikawa	Toshiya Yamada	September 23, 2025

== Reception ==
The manga was nominated for the seventh Next Manga Award in the Best Printed Manga category in 2021.
