= The Kingdoms of Ruin =

Japanese manga series

- First tankōbon volume cover, featuring Adonis (left) and Doroka (right)

破滅の王国 (Hametsu no Ōkoku)
- Genre: Dark fantasy; Science fantasy
- Manga
- Written by: yoruhashi
- Published by: Mag Garden
- English publisher: NA: Seven Seas Entertainment
- Imprint: Blade Comics
- Magazine: Monthly Comic Garden; Mag Comi
- Original run: April 5, 2019 – June 5, 2026
- Volumes: 15
- Anime television series
- Directed by: Keitaro Motonaga
- Written by: Takamitsu Kono
- Music by: Miki Sakurai; Shu Kanematsu; Hanae Nakamura
- Studio: Yokohama Animation Laboratory
- Licensed by: Crunchyroll; SA/SEA: Medialink
- Original network: MBS, TBS, BS-TBS, AT-X
- Original run: October 7, 2023 – December 23, 2023
- Episodes: 12
- icon

The Kingdoms of Ruin (はめつのおうこく, Hametsu no Ōkoku) is a Japanese manga series written and illustrated by yoruhashi. It was serialized in Mag Garden's Monthly Comic Garden magazine, and Mag Comi website from April 2019 to June 2026. An anime television series adaptation produced by Yokohama Animation Laboratory aired from October to December 2023.

== Plot ==
For ages, humans and witches had an alliance with witches using magic to help people. However, when humans eventually develop science that can at times outdo magic, the Redia Empire suddenly declares witches obsolete and orders them eradicated. The witch Chloe raised the human orphan Adonis and taught him her craft. When she is caught and executed, Adonis vows revenge against humanity. Although his quest for vengeance has left him filled with hatred and very antisocial, Adonis eventually allies with the witch Doroka, who begins to fall in love with him.

== Characters ==
Adonis (アドニス, Adonisu)
Voiced by: Kaito Ishikawa, Yuka Terasaki (young) (Japanese); Ben Stegmair, Brittney Karbowski (young) (English)
Doroka (ドロカ)
Voiced by: Azumi Waki (Japanese); Alexis Tipton (English)
Chloe (クロエ, Kuroe)
Voiced by: Ryoko Shiraishi (Japanese); Morgan Lauré (English)
Yamato (ヤマト)
Voiced by: Satoshi Hino
Yuki (ユキ)
Voiced by: Hikaru Tono
Shirousagi (シロウサギ)
Voiced by: Kishō Taniyama

== Media ==
=== Manga ===
Written and illustrated by yoruhashi, The Kingdoms of Ruin was serialized in Mag Garden's shōnen manga magazine Monthly Comic Garden from April 5, 2019, to June 9, 2026. It is a sequel to the author's previous work, The Kingdoms of Caliburn (剣の王国, Tsurugi nō Ukoku). It is also serialized on the Manga Doa, Mag Comi, pixiv Comic websites. Fifteen tankōbon volumes were released from October 2019 to July 2026. In April 2020, Seven Seas Entertainment announced that they had licensed the series for English publication.

No.	Original release date	Original ISBN	English release date	English ISBN
1	October 10, 2019	978-4-8000-0901-2	December 1, 2020	978-1-645-05855-7
1. "Hellfire"; 2. "Ten Years Later"; 3. "The Kingdom of Ruin"; 4. "Haven Fire"
2	February 10, 2020	978-4-8000-0937-1	April 6, 2021	978-1-648-27082-6
5. "The Black Formula"; 6. "A Kind Death"; 7. "A Reclaimed Everyday"; 8. "The Kingdom of Witches"; 9. "The Nightless Night Before"; 9.5 Side Story; 10. "The Resurrection of the Witch"
3	August 7, 2020	978-4-8000-1001-8	August 24, 2021	978-1-648-27290-5
11. "Joy to the World"; 12. "The Witches Strike Back"; 13. "Evil Slaying"; 14. "Vs. Yamato"; 15. "The Witch Doroka"; 16. "Ensemble Verse"
4	February 10, 2021	978-4-8000-1048-3	March 8, 2022	978-1-638-58135-2
17. "Homecoming"; 18. "A Burning Distance"; 19. "The Wastelands"; 20. "Stand by him. Stand by her."; 21. "Coronation"
5	August 10, 2021	978-4-8000-1121-3	December 20, 2022	978-1-638-58630-2
22. "Sand Land"; 23. "A Certain Married Couple"; 24. "Mamuta, the Ruined Country"; 25. "Collapsing Life"; 26. "Grave Talker"; 27. "Shall We Dance?"
6	February 9, 2022	978-4-8000-1172-5	May 16, 2023	978-1-638-58846-7
28. "A Lost Gaze"; 29. "A Nightmare Lullaby"; 30. "Sweet Talk"; 31. "Nightfall"; 32. "A Silvery World Without Sight"
7	September 9, 2022	978-4-8000-1244-9	November 28, 2023	979-8-888-43059-0
33. "A Network of Love"; 34. "The Crowns"; 35. "Night Fall"; 36. "Excited Expectations and Soaring Wicked Thoughts"
8	March 10, 2023	978-4-8000-1308-8	April 2, 2024	979-8-88843-393-5
37. "Like a Hum, So Are Dreams"; 38. "The Medical Nation of Markpoint"; 39. "The Tacticians in White Coats"; 40. "The Magician Laughs Last"
9	October 10, 2023	978-4-8000-1376-7	December 3, 2024	979-8-89160-199-4
41. "Another Magical Formula"; 42. "Informed Consent"; 43. "The One-eyed Twosome"; 44. "Shall We Dance Again?"
10	February 8, 2024	978-4-8000-1420-7	April 22, 2025	979-8-89160-930-3
45. "A Holy Night for Avengers"; 46. "Vs. Yuki"; 47. "Sentence Reload"; 48. "Swordsmanship of Love"
11	July 10, 2024	978-4-8000-1473-3	September 30, 2025	979-8-89373-762-2
49. "The Knight and the Princess"; 50. "Easter Egg"; 51. "Acid Rain"; 52. "A 2.3 Million Light-Year Love"
12	January 9, 2025	978-4-8000-1540-2	March 3, 2026	979-8-89561-786-1
53. "The Witch of the Forest"; 54. "Toto the Familiar"; 55. "No Peace for the Sinners"
13	April 10, 2025	978-4-8000-1579-2	October 13, 2026	979-8-89765-123-8
56. "A Feast of Shadow Blades"; 57. "Wolf Knight"; 58. "VS The Nation of Suzure"
14	April 10, 2026	978-4-8000-1732-1	April 13, 2027	979-8-90209-049-6
15	July 9, 2026	978-4-8000-1778-9	—	—

=== Anime ===
An anime television series adaptation was announced on February 1, 2023. The series is produced by Yokohama Animation Laboratory and directed by Keitaro Motonaga, with Takamitsu Kono in charge of series composition, Hiromi Kato designing the characters, and Miki Sakurai, Shu Kanematsu, and Hanae Nakamura composing the music. It aired from October 7 to December 23, 2023, on the Animeism programming block on MBS, TBS and BS-TBS. (Note: MBS and TBS listed the series premiere on October 6 at 25:58, which is effectively October 7 at 1:58 a.m. JST.) The opening theme song is "Kieru Made" (消えるまで; "Until It Disappears") by Hana Hope, while the ending theme song is "Prayer" by Who-ya Extended.

At Anime Expo 2023, Crunchyroll announced that they streamed the series outside of Asia. Medialink licensed the series in South and Southeast Asia and is streaming it on the Ani-One Asia YouTube channel.

==== Episodes ====
No.	Title (Note: All English titles are taken from Crunchyroll.)	Directed by	Written by	Storyboarded by	Original release date
1	"And So, Our Story Begins"; Transliteration: "Hajimari Hajimari" (Japanese: はじまり はじまり)	Shin'ya Kawabe	Takamitsu Kono	Gōichi Iwahata; Keitaro Motonaga	October 7, 2023 (Note: This episode aired at 2:08 a.m. JST, 15 minutes after the original air time.)
God created humans and witches where the witches' magic became prosperity and peace for humanity. However, the Redia Empire developed technology that advances magic, meaning it is no longer needed, and humanity went against and eradicated all witches. A powerful witch Chloe and her human apprentice Adonis are walking in the desert, and they are attacked by soldiers. Adonis says his kind deserve to be destroyed for this and he wants to do it despite Chloe's reasoning. But they are suddenly transported to the Redia Empire where they are met by Emperor Goethe. Chloe gets stripped and humiliated in front of the crowd. When Adonis is about to be killed after insulting them, Chloe begs Goethe to spare his life and lets herself get executed. Adonis is angered by humanity's display of cruelty and the loss of the one who loved and cared about him. 10 years later, in an internment camp, the prisoners Doroka and Anna talk about the belief that humanity would be happy once the witches were gone wasn't true, as humanity began fighting each other. The Redia Empire started wars that never end and capture people from other lands. Doroka is about to be sold but escapes while freeing the prisoners. She runs in to a room where a contained Adonis is about to be freed, ready for revenge.
2	"Heavenly Fire"; Transliteration: "Heibunfaia" (Japanese: ヘイブンファイア)	Homani Inamura	Takamitsu Kono	Gōichi Iwahata	October 14, 2023
Adonis breaks free and kills the guards, the Military is alert by Adonis's escape and searches for him. Adonis combine magic and weaponry to turn a bullet gigantic to a building and begins his revenge by killing all citizens of the Redia Empire. Operator executive Eekhout kills the prisoners and the personnel for causing this. Adonis summon a giant robot to cause destruction and goes to confront Goethe, Adonis fight back the soldiers as he spends ten years to determine the most precise way to slaughter a nation. Adonis summon bullet bell to brutally gun down and massacring all the citizens, Doroka runs to stop Adonis. Adonis is angered when Doroka says the people are "innocent" and says humans always fight dirty and use cheap tricks. Doroka reveals she knows him, and she is in fact a witch, she and the witches survived, and they couldn't save Chloe because they were desperate to escape. Doroka says they can bring Chloe back to life and she infiltrated the Redia Empire to save him in order to bring back Chloe, they need Adonis and his memories of her to do it. Adonis begins to see Doroka speaks the truth and Doroka tells him he is not alone anymore, but Doroka is shot by Eekhout.
3	"A Gentle Death"; Transliteration: "Yasashi Ishi" (Japanese: やさしい死)	Toshiya Shindome	Takamitsu Kono	Toshiya Shindome	October 21, 2023
In the past young Doroka experience the attack and destruction by human soldiers and her friend Mia tells her to run to Madam Ophelia for safety. A wounded Doroka slowly dies, and Adonis uses magic to send bullets back at the soldiers. Eekhout shots at Adnois but it is stopped and is send back at him in gigantic size, Eekhout dies by the impact. Yamato's sister Yuki wants to use the magic suppression device but is stopped by Theta, Yamato gets a call from Theta who tells about Human Cellular Dysfunction Disease; the soldiers were affected by particles from the devices during the witch hunts 10 years ago soon died as the device kills cells. Because there are no more witches left to restore the natural environment and cleanse harmful rays are gone. Meaning using the device on wide range will cause people to be exposed by particles and eventually die by it, Goethe stood before the device which caused Goethe's illness. However, Yuki still wants to active the device for the Redia Empire despite the illnesses, Theta stops this but both Yuki and Theta are exposed hard. Adonis is weakened and a woman soldier then beheads him, the incident is over and Goethe speaks about the "greatness" of the Redia Empire. Chief Oz talks to Charmy about analysis on Adonis and Charmy discover the body is a fake. Adonis wakes up somewhere.
4	"The Nation of Witches"; Transliteration: "Majo no Kuni" (Japanese: 魔女の国)	Futoshi Kawaguchi	Chabo Higurashi	Futoshi Kawaguchi	October 28, 2023
Adonis remembered the one who beheaded him actually used duplication magic to create a fake body of him to fake his death. That person turns out to be Anna who sends to him to Madam Ophelia. Ophelia tells him he is in the nation of witches and they all knew Chloe but Chloe was cast out of the witches' nation for teaching magic to a human child. Adonis discovers they are on the moon and the witches came to this place ten years ago as the new witches' nation, Lunamilia. Ophelia shows Adonis a Mito tree that produces witches. Witches are unisex, unlike humans, and they do not have mating pairs. They receive life from the tree and this tree is the last one as the humans burned all the other mitos. Since it's the only tree that can birth and regenerate witches, memory is life itself, and if Adonis puts his memories of Chloe in the fruit, it will resurrect her. Anna meets Adonis and is angry that Adonis is not showing gratitude towards Doroka as she died for him. Adonis tells her he knows the witches are planning to use Chloe for their own agenda, as he remembers Doroka warned him about it. The witches plan to kidnap human slaves and children and teach them magic the same way Adonis uses magic, and make them fight since the witches need an alternative source of defense. Despite this, Adonis still want to resurrect Chloe and to follow her will. On the ceremony to bring Chloe back to life, Adonis puts memories of her in the fruit and sees flashbacks of her. However, Chloe was in pain and can't live in this world alone. Doroka gets resurrected.
5	"Joy to the World"; Transliteration: "Morobito Kozorite" (Japanese: もろびとこぞりて)	Masato Tamagawa; Kang Seo ki	Kōjirō Nakamura	Shinji Itadaki	November 4, 2023
Adonis is unable to bring Chloe back to life due to the way of the world has become, and resurrect Doroka to repay her back for saving him. Ophelia and the witches are upset that Adonis did this after what they did for him, Adonis says he won't resurrect Chloe. But suddenly people is about arrive due to Adonis had a tracking chip on him during his time as a prisoner. The tracking chip explode which causes the mito to be burned, Yamato and soldiers have come for Adonis and the witches. Adonis fight Yamato while Ophelia and the witches easily kills the soldiers, but more squads are coming. Back at the Redia Empire Theta explains how the witches have managed to hide themselves on the moon. Yamato cuts down many witches including Ophelia, Doroka is saved by Anna with her duplication magic but she herself is fatally wounded. Adonis gives Yamato powerful attacks and cuts off his arm, Yamato is about to finish Adonis off. Back at the Redia Empire, they try to get video back on as they have no idea what happened on the battlefield, Yamato is on the monitor who says all the witches the moon are dead, but his eyes shows he is actually Adonis.
6	"The Witch Doroka"; Transliteration: "Majo Doroka" (Japanese: 魔女ドロカ)	Homani Inamura	Takamitsu Kono	Gōichi Iwahata; Keitaro Motonaga	November 11, 2023
Yamato and the soldiers are stopped by Doroka who uses her love spell, Yamato tries to resist and Doroka tells Yamato to end this and make peace. Yamato resist enough to attack and beating Doroka, Yamato says the delusional belief about the witches and Adonis. But Doroka gives Yamato a reality check that he has killed countless people too which shocks him, she asks why doing this to them even if they don't need the witches now that they have science, there's no need to kill them. Both races used to be living in harmony and orders Yamato to retreat, Yamato's refusal to listen eventually falls under the love spell, Yamato is stabbed through the head and beheaded by Adonis. Goethe is informed about Adonis and the witches, Goethe suddenly acting insane and strange, his queen used love spell on him and orders him to kill himself. Goethe then tells the reason he made the Redia Empire the strongest nation in the world with their technology and killing all the witches was all for his queen as he did everything she told him to do, Goethe falls and impaled to death. Her magic only controls men and it doesn't work on women, she wanted to get rid of her kind and is the mastermind behind everything, she orders Shirousagi to bring her Adonis. Her real name is Dorothea Grethe, Witch of the Unknown, she possesses a quill and pictures of a red-haired man who looks like Adonis. Adonis uses Yamato's face to trick the people and to give him transfer back, Ophelia see how Adonis planned to escape the moon, he sacrificed the witches for that. Adonis takes Doroka and they are about to be transferred, but back at the Redia Empire they are aware of the trickery and is ready for them.
7	"Stand by him. Stand by her."	Makoto Sokuza	Kōjirō Nakamura	Futoshi Kawaguchi	November 18, 2023
Theta and the soldiers are shocked that Adonis does not show up and they don't know where he is. Adonis and Doroka are in the wastelands as Adonis changed the location of the transfer, Adonis begins planning with the destruction of the Redia Empire and procure information and supplies on their way there. Doroka wants to go back and scold Adonis for his behaviour, Adonis shows what Doroka tried to do and see why the witches don't like Doroka as she wanted to reconcile with humans so easily. Adonis says Chloe's life is more precious to him than all of humanity and the world who took her from him deserve to be destroyed, Doroka says to Adonis she won't tell him to forgive them for what they've done, but if he continue with his revenge it will shatter his heart and he'll end up like the humans who took Chloe from him. Adonis bleeds from his injuries and a group of bikers find them. Adonis wakes up in a place and is met by the leader Punch, the residence are people from developing countries, refugees and slaves who have escaped from Redia. Later in the evening during the party, the people fall asleep as Adonis changed the alcohol's formula and leaves Doroka due to not wanting her to end up like him. Punch reveals to Doroka he knows who Adonis is as in the past he was dying until Chloe and Adonis saved him, Punch is one of the humans who didn't went against the witches. Punch says Adonis chose revenge even if it leads to his death, that's his choice. Doroka won't let Adonis die and goes after him on the motorcycle, Adonis and Doroka travel together.
8	"Coronation"; Transliteration: "Taikanshiki" (Japanese: 戴冠式)	Kang Seo ki	Chabo Higurashi	Shinji Itadaki	November 25, 2023
In the Redia Empire, the coronation of Dorothea as the new monarch of Redia begins, Dorothea's love magic causes many men and women to fell under her spell and becomes Redia's idol. Meanwhile in another nation are watching the broadcast, they are commenting that Dorothea a witch herself has exterminated her own kind while ruling the world. During this, the Agency and Theta are executed by Dorothea's soldiers, Shirousagi are in the Wastelands to find Adonis. Adonis tells Doroka that he is not going to stop seeking revenge, Doroka tries to suggests to not fight kind people like Punch and his friends. Adonis ask Doroka about her love magic that makes men fall in love with her and control them, so why didn't she use it on him when they first met which would be the most effective way but tried to convince him instead, Doroka answers that he wouldn't have liked their first meeting to go like that. They arrive in Sand Land Town who is in ruins, they go through a police station and they hear someone singing, they find a man in a cell. Adonis asks him if there is a metropolis nearby, he tells them about the city-state of Mamuta, Doroka says they can't leave him there but Adonis tells her the cell is unlocked and the person in the bed are the man's deceased wife. Their next destination is Mamuta.
9	"The Ruined Kingdom of Mamuta"; Transliteration: "Bōkoku Mamuta" (Japanese: 亡国マムタ)	Futoshi Kawaguchi	Touko Machida	Futoshi Kawaguchi	December 2, 2023
Adonis and Doroka arrive in Mamuta, who looks to be abandoned. They see a woman on the ground who turns out to be a robot, Adonis says it is a Madoa; a mechanical doll created as a plaything for humans. They go to a room where a bunch of them are making love to a corpse, they are made by Redia. Somewhere, two kunoichi named Five and Six kills Redian soldiers. Adonis tells about the slave trade back in Redia, it wasn't easy for this nation to import many Redia sex robots, so they offered their own women in exchange for more dolls. Mamuta probably exported all the women in their nation to Redia Empire, they let go of their wives and daughters so they could purchase sex robots, this is how humans are; they know no limits. This nation fell in ruins because without women, the next generation can't be born, the men drown in pleasure and rot away, a nation like that can't last and this probably isn't the only nation that's fallen this way. Five and Six arrive, Emperor Suzure instructed them to capture anything that might help keep Redia in check, they go to capture Adonis, but Shirousagi meets them and they attack him. Adonis says Anna, Ophelia and the witches of Lunamilia where killed by the humans which he lured to them, why would she travel with him despite that, Doroka answers she don't want to blame him and don't want argue anymore. The witches were trying to use him, their desire for magical items to use against humanity led them to abduct him, provoke him, and attempt to resurrect Chloe, what's that if not betrayal. Adonis and Doroka are met by Shirousagi, who destroys the motorcycle and has killed Five and Six, he introduce himself to Adonis and is here for his head.
10	"The Eyes That Were Lost"; Transliteration: "Ushinawareru Manazashi" (Japanese: 失われるまなざし)	Toshiya Niidome; Kang Seo ki	Touko Machida	Toshiya Niidome	December 9, 2023
Charmy is monitoring the group and Adonis see how he messed up as Redia have found him, Shirousagi is messing with the heads of Five and Six, Doroka tells him to stop that and Shirousagi gets closer to her, he notice something about her. Adonis begins to fight him but Shirousagi is faster than Adonis, Adonis fires bullets at him and Shirousagi dodges them, Adonis see that Shirousagi's reaction speed must mean he is a cyborg. Doroka uses her love magic to stop Shirousagi, but it has no effect on him and is surprised that Doroka is using a love spell and says it is no wonder she looks just like Dorothea, both Doroka and Adonis wonder what he meant about Redia's queen. They wonder how Shirousagi is able to move and he shows them the heart symbol on his chest, Shirousagi uses his cyborg abilities to release Hummingbird at them. Doroka still wants to fight even without magic, she doesn't know if seeking revenge is wrong or not, but she stands by Adonis to the very end. Adonis gives Doroka a sword and himself an armor to fight the Hummingbird, Doroka almost get Shirousagi, but hesitates to kill him, thus allowing Shirousagi to punch both Doroka and Adonis hard. Shirousagi manages to restraint Adonis and grabs Doroka in the hair. She thanks Adonis for walking by her side, if she could have one wish she would wish they could've seen more sights together, as her eyes are brutally crushed by Shirousagi.
11	"Knightfall"; Transliteration: "Naitofōru" (Japanese: 騎士化(ナイトフォール))	Honami Inamura	Takamitsu Kono	Gōichi Iwahata	December 16, 2023
Doroka screams in agony and Adonis experience a Déjà vu, Doroka falls as her eyes is ripped out and has lost her sight. Shirousagi messes with her eyes and then destroys it, this rages Adonis and attacks him. Adonis and Doroka hide themselves, Adonis burns on her face to stop the bleeding, Doroka imagine that both of them lived in an ordinary life and wonder why did things turn out this way. Shirousagi searches for Adonis and both Adonis and Doroka come back at him with giant robot, Adonis wants payback for what he did to Doroka, Adonis and Shirousagi continue to fight. Adonis is knocked unconscious and begins to beat Doroka. A flashback shows when Shirousagi met Dorothea by chance, Dorothea tells him about something and became her slave. Shirousagi then says the world doesn't need two of the same witch, even if its just of the ensembleverse. Doroka doesn't know what Shirousagi is talking about, but tells him to leave Adonis alone, she knows the unforgivable massacre he did in Redia but that only happened because Redia and humanity started hunting witches as they are the ones who started it first. Doroka wanted to end the fighting and wanted to believe revenge wasn't everything but now she is not sure if humans should be forgiven, after everything they've done to her, she can't believe revenge is wrong anymore. Shirousagi brushes off her words and only cares about taking Adonis's head. Realizing he's outmatched, Adonis tells Doroka to cast love spell on him to fight back, Doroka's memory shows when the witches learned of Doroka's love magic and they mocked her which led to her desperate to being a good witch. Adonis tells her not to worry as this won't make him fall in love with her, Doroka uses Knightfall that makes Adonis move very fast, his wounds and bones are all healed, and his magic are limitless. Adonis is powered up now and Shirousagi, frightened by his power boost, tries to flee, but Adonis summons Quinblade that hits and cuts Shirousagi real hard, leaving him in shock.
12	"Love and Revenge"; Transliteration: "Ai to Fukushū" (Japanese: 愛と復讐)	Masato Kitagawa	Takamitsu Kono	Gōichi Iwahata	December 23, 2023
With his magic and physical strength increased, Adonis dominates Shirousagi and rips both his arms and legs each as retaliation for Dorokua's eyes, disabling him for a moment. Adonis begins using a spell that Chloe taught him. Shirousagi tries to stop him, but Adonis blocks all of his attacks, and freezes Shirousagi with his spell, mortally wounding him and ending the battle. The spell freezes the entire city and across the wasteland, Charmy has lost the video and signal over them and they see the power of the spell from the satellite, Oz see how powerful Adonis is. Chloe's spirit shows up and hug Adonis, he sees her one last time as she vanishes. As he is dying, Shirousagi tells Doroka they look just like them, like Dorothea and "him", he also tells Doroka that if she sees the queen, she should tell her even though he failed to acquire the Incarnation, he did his best and laments about Dorothea not returning his feelings for her as he disintegrates. Adonis tells Doroka he will find a way to fix her eyes. In the Redia Empire, Dorothea is jogging and the citizens are worshipping her, Dorothea, currently unaware of Shirousagi's death, asks if they have received response from the Crowns in the other nations; Military Nation Mika, Eastern Nation Suzure, Markpoint Medical Nation and Single Mother Nation Orionsono, the tyrannical Dorothea says if they won't listen to her request, she'll declare war on them. Somewhere else, Doroka is sad that she used her love spell on Adonis as his heart and feelings he held onto for Chloe, she directed them towards her. Adonis tells her not to regret it as he told her to do it. Adonis uses a bandage to cover her eyes and Doroka begins to fall for him, but Adonis tells her Chloe is the only one for him and her love spell had no effect him, they continue their journey while holding hands. Yuki has finally regain consciousness and is turned into a cyborg. Knowing Yamato is dead, she decides to go after Adonis to avenge her brother. Doroka tells Adonis she knows now that revenge isn't wrong.
