= The Skull Dragon's Precious Daughter =

Japanese manga series

- First tankōbon volume cover

骨ドラゴンのマナ娘 (Hone Doragon no Manamusume)
- Genre: Fantasy; Slice of life
- Manga
- Written by: Ichi Yukishiro
- Published by: Mag Garden
- English publisher: NA: J-Novel Club (digital); Seven Seas Entertainment (print)
- Magazine: Mag Comi; Monthly Comic Garden; (January 5, 2022–March 5, 2026)
- Original run: September 25, 2020 – present
- Volumes: 6
- Anime television series
- Directed by: Kuniyasu Nishina
- Written by: Yuka Yamada
- Studio: Doga Kobo
- Original run: 2027 – scheduled
- icon

The Skull Dragon's Precious Daughter (Japanese: 骨ドラゴンのマナ娘, Hepburn: Hone Doragon no Manamusume) is a Japanese manga series written and illustrated by Ichi Yukishiro. It initially began serialization on Mag Garden's Mag Comi manga website in September 2020. It was later serialized in the Monthly Comic Garden magazine from January 2022 to March 2026. An anime television series adaptation produced by Doga Kobo is set to premiere in 2027.

== Plot ==
Eve, a young girl, is dropped into a forest where all garbage is thrown away. There, she meets an elderly dragon, which she names Snoozy. With Snoozy protecting her, Eve grows up happy. However, his time was short-lived because Snoozy suddenly dies. Six months later, Eve uses her magical powers to revive Snoozy as a skull dragon.

== Characters ==
Eve (イブ, Ibu)
Voiced by: Kana Hanazawa
Snoozy (ネム, Nemu)
Voiced by: Kazuhiko Inoue

== Media ==
=== Manga ===
Written and illustrated by Ichi Yukishiro, The Skull Dragon's Precious Daughter initially began serialization on Mag Garden's Mag Comi manga website on September 25, 2020. It was later serialized in the Monthly Comic Garden magazine from January 5, 2022, to March 5, 2026. Its chapters have been collected into six tankōbon volumes as of August 2025.

During their panel at Anime Boston 2022, J-Novel Club announced that they had licensed the series for English digital publication. In October that same year, Seven Seas Entertainment announced that they would begin releasing print copies in March 2023.

| No. | Original release date | Original ISBN | North American release date | North American ISBN |
|---|---|---|---|---|
| 1 | April 14, 2021 | 978-4-8000-1074-2 | August 9, 2022 (digital); March 21, 2023 (print) | 978-1-7183-3709-1 (digital); 978-1-68579-482-8 (print) |
Chapters 1–6
| 2 | November 12, 2021 | 978-4-8000-1151-0 | October 25, 2022 (digital); July 18, 2023 (print) | 978-1-7183-3710-7 (digital); 978-1-68579-624-2 (print) |
Chapters 7–12
| 3 | October 14, 2022 | 978-4-8000-1257-9 | July 12, 2023 (digital); January 9, 2024 (print) | 978-1-7183-3711-4 (digital); 979-8-88843-104-7 (print) |
Chapters 13–18; Bonus
| 4 | July 13, 2023 | 978-4-8000-1352-1 | March 26, 2024 (digital); July 16, 2024 (print) | 978-1-7183-3712-1 (digital); 979-8-88843-807-7 (print) |
Chapters 19–25
| 5 | August 9, 2024 | 978-4-8000-1485-6 | April 2, 2025 (digital); August 12, 2025 (print) | 978-1-7183-3713-8 (digital); 979-8-89160-665-4 (print) |
Chapters 26–31; Bonus
| 6 | August 12, 2025 | 978-4-8000-1627-0 | April 29, 2026 (digital); December 1, 2026 (print) | 978-1-7183-3714-5 (digital); 979-8-89765-946-3 (print) |
Chapters 32–38

=== Anime ===
An anime television series adaptation was announced on March 4, 2026. The series will be produced by Doga Kobo and directed by Kuniyasu Nishina, with Yuka Yamada handling series composition and Tomoya Atsumi designing the characters. It is set to premiere in 2027.

== Reception ==
The series was nominated for the 7th Next Manga Awards in the web category.
