= Mars Red =

Japanese stage reading and its adaptions

- Anime promotional poster
- Manga
- Written by: Bun-O Fujisawa
- Illustrated by: Kemuri Karakara
- Published by: Mag Garden
- English publisher: NA: Seven Seas
- Magazine: Monthly Comic Garden
- Original run: January 4, 2020 – July 5, 2021
- Volumes: 3
- Anime television series
- Directed by: Kouhei Hatano; Shinya Sadamitsu (Note: Chief Unit Director (演出チーフ))
- Produced by: Yasuyuki Nishiya; Natsuko Kawasaki; Etsuko Iijima; Kentarou Inoue; Souta Yoshio; Yousuke Satou; Kasumi Hagiuda
- Written by: Junichi Fujisaku
- Music by: Toshiyuki Muranaka
- Studio: Signal.MD
- Licensed by: Crunchyroll
- Original network: ytv, Tokyo MX, Chūkyō TV, CS Family Gekijo
- Original run: April 6, 2021 – June 29, 2021
- Episodes: 13
- Video game

Edge of Nightmare
- Developer: D-techno
- Genre: Adventure
- Platform: Android, iOS
- Released: JP: May 20, 2021; WW: July 9, 2021

Mars Red (stylized as MARS RED) is a Japanese anime television series produced by Signal.MD. It is based on a stage reading play written by Bun-O Fujisawa. The series aired from April to June 2021.

== Plot ==
In 1923, the Japanese government creates a new unit ("Code Zero") within the army to counter the rising threat of vampires, as well as their artificial blood source. Code Zero offers all vampires the same choice: surrender and receive benefits such as blood and formal registration, or face eradication.

Most humans die immediately when bitten by vampires, but others are able to survive and become vampires themselves. The vampires cannot be neatly classified since they exhibit considerable variation among their ranks. There are two types of vampires according to their abilities: common vampires, who behave as mindless predators, and "noble" vampires, who are far more intelligent and refined, though still cruel. The anime also portrays vampires who retain their human nature and long for a sense of belonging in the increasingly hostile world.

As the members of Code Zero carry out their mission, they encounter strange vampires, humans, and phenomena that force them to question their own identities and purpose.

== Characters ==
Yoshinobu Maeda (前田義信, Maeda Yoshinobu)
Voiced by: Junichi Suwabe (2013 stage, anime), Hiroki Takahashi (2015 stage) (Japanese); Sean Schemmel (anime) (English)
A stern man who has dedicated his life to the military. As Colonel, he leads Code Zero, a small ragtag unit of vampire soldiers.
Shutaro Kurusu (栗栖秀太郎, Kurusu Shutaro)
Voiced by: Hidenori Tokuyama (2013 stage), Yūta Furukawa (2015 stage), Tasuku Hatanaka (anime) (Japanese); Zach Aguilar (anime) (English)
A member of Code Zero. Kurusu is a sensitive young man who is able to retain to his humanity, despite being an A-rank vampire of considerable strength.
Tokuichi Yamagami (山上徳一, Yamagami Tokuichi)
Voiced by: Jūrōta Kosugi (2013 stage), Junichi Suwabe (2015 stage), Kōichi Yamadera (anime) (Japanese); Bryan Massey (anime) (English)
Another member of Code Zero, designated as an "unranked" vampire with few powers. As a human, he served alongside Maeda and considers him a friend.
Suwa (スワ, Suwa)
Voiced by: Kenichi Suzumura (2013 and 2015 stage, anime) (Japanese); Aaron Dismuke (anime) (English)
A member of Code Zero who specializes in stealth operations. He has white hair and appears young, but has lived for hundreds of years. He covers the lower half of his face with a mask at all times.
Takeuchi (タケウチ, Takeuchi)
Voiced by: Akira Ishida (2013 and 2015 stage, anime) (Japanese); Chris Guerrero (anime) (English)
Code Zero's scientist and engineer. He is brilliant, eccentric, and cheerful. Takeuchi seldom engages in battle but assists greatly with his inventions and plans.
Sonosuke Nakajima (中島宗之助, Nakajima Sōnosuke)
Voiced by: Hiroki Takahashi (2013 stage), Kenyu Horiuchi (2015 stage), Hiroshi Yanaka (anime) (Japanese); Mick Wingert (anime) (English)
Maeda's commanding officer, with whom he has a personal connection. His primary goal is to establish a military force composed of undying vampire soldiers.
Defrott (デフロット, Defurotto)
Voiced by: Miyuki Sawashiro (2013 and 2015 stage, anime) (Japanese); Ciarán Strange (anime) (English)
A talented actor who develops a bond with both Misaki and Aoi. His outward appearance is child-like, but he has tremendous presence and maturity.
Aoi Shirase (白瀬葵, Shirase Aoi)
Voiced by: Minami (2013 stage), Aki Asakura (2015 stage), Fumiko Orikasa (anime) (Japanese); Caitlin Glass (anime) (English)
A fearless reporter for the local newspaper, she is fascinated with vampires as well as the performing arts. She has known Kurusu since childhood.
Misaki (岬, Misaki)
Voiced by: Ayahi Takagaki (Japanese); Dawn M. Bennett (English)
An up-and-coming stage actress who performs alongside Defrott. She is engaged to Maeda, but has yet to meet him.
Shinnosuke Tenmaya (天満屋慎之助, Tenmaya Shin'nosukei)
Voiced by: Sachi Kokuryu (Japanese); Katelyn Barr (English)
A mysterious, elegant young man who provides safe refuge for vampires.
Rufus Glenn (ルーファス・グレン, Rūfasu Guren)
Voiced by: Makoto Furukawa (Japanese); Reagan Murdock (English)
A foreigner with connections to vampire nobility as well as the military.

== Media ==
=== Manga ===
A manga adaptation of the reading play by Kemuri Karakara was run in Monthly Comic Garden from January 4, 2020, to July 5, 2021, and was compiled into three volumes. Seven Seas Entertainment published the manga in North America.

=== Anime ===
On February 6, 2020, Yomiuri-TV Enterprise LTD announced their 50th Anniversary project, a new anime television series directed by Kōhei Hatano to be co-produced by Funimation. The series is animated by Signal.MD, with Junichi Fujisaku writing the series' scripts, Yukari Takeuchi adapting the character designs originally by Kemuri Karakara, and Toshiyuki Muranaka composing the series' music. The series aired from April 6 to June 29, 2021, on YTV and other channels. The opening theme is "Seimei no Aria" (生命のアリア; "Aria of Life") by Wagakki Band while the ending theme is "ON MY OWN" by Hyde. The first episode was given a premiere screening on Funimation one week before the Japanese broadcast, in both subtitled and dubbed options. Following Sony's acquisition of Crunchyroll, the series was moved to Crunchyroll.

No.	Title	Directed by	Written by	Original release date
1	"Dawn"; Transliteration: "Hi no Ataru Basho" (Japanese: 陽のあたる場所)	Kōhei Hatano	Junichi Fujisaku	April 6, 2021 (Note: This episode was pre-screened on March 30, 2021 on Funimation.)
2	"Till Death Do Us Part"; Transliteration: "Shi ga Futari o Wakatsu Made" (Japanese: 死が二人を分かつまで)	Nao Miyoshi, Shinya Sadamitsu, Kōhei Hatano	Junichi Fujisaku	April 13, 2021
3	"His Dream"; Transliteration: "Yume Makura" (Japanese: 夢枕)	Shinya Sadamitsu, Kōhei Hatano	Junichi Fujisaku	April 20, 2021
4	"Unknown Song"; Transliteration: "Uta Shirazu no Uta" (Japanese: 歌知らずの歌)	Shigeru Ueda	Junichi Fujisaku	April 27, 2021 (Note: This episode aired at 2:04 a.m. JST, 5 minutes after the original air time on Yomiuri Telecasting Corporation.)
5	"Persona Non Grata"; Transliteration: "Perusona Non Gurāta" (Japanese: ペルソナ・ノン・グラータ)	Toshiyuki Sone	Junichi Fujisaku	May 4, 2021
6	"The Last Blue Sky"; Transliteration: "Saigo no Aozora" (Japanese: さいごの青空)	Shinya Sadamitsu	Junichi Fujisaku	May 11, 2021
7	"The Letter"; Transliteration: "Tegami" (Japanese: 手紙)	Akie Ishii	Junichi Fujisaku	May 18, 2021
8	"Purgatory"; Transliteration: "Rengoku" (Japanese: 煉獄)	Shinya Sadamitsu	Junichi Fujisaku	May 25, 2021
9	"Suspicion"; Transliteration: "Ginen" (Japanese: 疑念)	Hitomi Ezoe	Junichi Fujisaku	June 1, 2021 (Note: This episode aired at 2:09 a.m. JST, 10 minutes after the original air time on Yomiuri Telecasting Corporation.)
10	"A Midsummer Night's Dream Gone By"; Transliteration: "Tōrisugishi, Natsu no Yo no Yume" (Japanese: 通り過ぎし、夏の夜の夢)	Shinya Sadamitsu	Junichi Fujisaku	June 8, 2021 (Note: This episode aired at 2:05 a.m. JST, 6 minutes after the original air time on Yomiuri Telecasting Corporation.)
11	"Dark Wings"; Transliteration: "kokuyoku" (Japanese: 黒翼)	Fumio Maezono	Junichi Fujisaku	June 15, 2021
12	"King of Fools"; Transliteration: "Dōke no Ō" (Japanese: 道化の王)	Shinya Sadamitsu	Junichi Fujisaku	June 22, 2021
13	"Frailty, Thy Name Is..."; Transliteration: "Yowaki Mono, Nanji no Na wa" (Japanese: 弱きもの、汝の名は)	Kōhei Hatano	Junichi Fujisaku	June 29, 2021

=== Mobile game ===
A free-to-play smartphone adventure game titled Mars Red: Edge of the Nightmare (Kawataredoki no Uta) was announced on February 20, 2021, and released on May 20, 2021, in Japan and worldwide on July 9, 2021. The game was developed by D-techno and franchise creator Bun'O Fujisawa created an original story. The game ended its service on January 31, 2022.
