= Sketchbook (manga) =

Japanese manga and anime series

- Cover of the first manga volume

スケッチブック (Suketchibukku)
- Genre: Comedy, iyashikei
- Manga
- Written by: Totan Kobako
- Published by: Mag Garden
- Magazine: Monthly Comic Blade (April 2002–July 2014); Monthly Comic Garden (July 2014–June 2019)
- Original run: April 2002 – June 2019
- Volumes: 14
- Anime television series

Sketchbook ~full color's~
- Directed by: Yoshimasa Hiraike
- Written by: Mari Okada
- Music by: Ken Muramatsu
- Studio: Hal Film Maker
- Licensed by: NA: AnimEigo
- Original network: TV Tokyo
- Original run: October 2, 2007 – December 25, 2007
- Episodes: 13

Sketchbook (スケッチブック, Suketchibukku) is a Japanese manga series written and illustrated by Totan Kobako. First serialized in the April 2002 issue of Monthly Comic Blade, the individual chapters were collected and published by Mag Garden until June 2019. Chapters also appeared in Comic Blade Masamune. An anime television series adaptation, under the title Sketchbook ~full color's~, aired in Japan between October 2 and December 25, 2007. The story revolves around a group of high school students, mostly female, in the art club at their high school. The main character is a young, shy and quiet girl named Sora Kajiwara who goes through life at her own pace.

== Plot ==
Sketchbook begins with Sora Kajiwara joining the art club of her unnamed Fukuoka high school, and goes on to chronicle her subsequent experiences and those of her fellow club members.

== Characters ==
=== Art club ===
==== Freshmen ====
Sora Kajiwara (梶原 空, Kajiwara Sora)
Voiced by: Kana Hanazawa
The protagonist of the series, a girl with a playful spirit and an observant nature. Her undiminished, childlike and playful behavior is shown throughout the series and tends to drive her actions. The world is her toybox; she rarely encounters an object she does not want to experiment with. Her active, somewhat impractical imagination envisions a multitude of bizarre scenarios, leading her to often absurd assumptions and conclusions. She is particularly fond of cats, befriending and naming various neighborhood strays, of tea, always keeping a flask-full handy, and of drawing, which induces her to join her school's art club, thus commencing the events of Sketchbook.
Sora is extremely quiet, rarely speaking in the anime. She is easily frightened, and even mildly startling events can send her into hiding. On more than one occasion she flees from her close friend, Asō, because her hairstyle is unfamiliar. Among the things she has admitted or been shown to find scary are bowling balls, high voltage towers, gym instructors, escalators, security cameras, frozen pike, passing trains, Daichi Negishi, and a balloon-seller in a cat costume.
Sora has long, straight hair, reaching about to her waist. Its color is uncertain: in different illustrations, it has appeared in various shades of blue, green, purple, and grey; in the strip it is not distinguishable from black; in the animation, it is a light blue-grey. When not in her school uniform, which comprises a white dress shirt, green tie, double-breasted blue blazer and knee-length skirt, she usually wears a light collared shirt over a dark undershirt, with knee-length trousers. When out on a walk or hike she accouters herself with a wide-brimmed straw hat, backpack, umbrella, tea flask, and sketchbook. She will also occasionally wear a watch on her left wrist.
Natsumi Asō (麻生 夏海, Asō Natsumi)
Voiced by: Asuka Nakase
A Hakata-ben speaker with twin ponytails and reddish-purple hair. She has the fairly unique hobby of making hand-puppets (which resemble the Muppets of Fraggle Rock) and conducting conversations among them; they serve alternatively as diversion, study tools, and gloves. There are five, all siblings, named Kerokichi, Ranran, Michael, Robert, and Tom-Tom. Asō joins the art club together with Kajiwara, whom she meets on the way to the club room; the two remain good friends afterward. Her best friend appears to be Hazuki, without whom she is rarely seen. While generally a very thoughtful and pragmatic person, Asō can occasionally let her boisterousness get the better of her.
Hazuki Torikai (鳥飼 葉月, Torikai Hazuki)
Voiced by: Yui Makino
Hazuki is a parsimonious blond-haired girl and the third freshman to join the art club. Her extreme frugality, coupled with her perfectionist, Type-A personality, can turn everyday errands into protracted ordeals and even the simplest transaction into an onerous travail. Even her approach to art is largely determined by economic considerations. Despite these tendencies, she is probably the most overall well-adjusted, level-headed, and dependable of the major characters. She is also extremely polite and very caring toward animals. Hazuki lives alone. She regularly appears in the strip by herself, the only character other than Kajiwara to do so.
Kate (ケイト, Keito)
Voiced by: Yūko Gotō
A transfer student from Canada. Kate is already fluent, albeit prone to sometimes outlandish mistakes, in Japanese before coming to the art club. Perhaps indicative of her accent, much of her speech is rendered in katakana. She seems fascinated by the Japanese language and writing system and by the workings of language in general, constantly pointing out oddities and questioning rough spots. Why she came to Japan is never mentioned.

==== Upperclassmen ====
Kokage Kuga (空閑 木陰, Kuga Kokage)
Voiced by: Momoko Saitō
A dark-haired girl of diminutive stature. Kuga's perpetually expressionless face and bizarre behavior suggest a morose, perhaps sinister character, but rather than depressed, withdrawn, or morbid, she is in fact playful, mischievous, and jocular (and occasionally morbid). The author suggests that her eccentricity is actually an affectation, designed to help her communicate with others. Asō and Kuga sometimes ride the train together in the manga.
Daichi Negishi (根岸 大地, Negishi Daichi)
Voiced by: Hiro Shimono
An outburst-prone second-year student who is one of two males in the art club. Even minor annoyances can provoke him to fits of rage, shouting and throwing whatever object happens to be handy. Despite his temper, Negishi is generally a fairly pleasant individual. He is also the preferred target of the inveterate goofball and prankster Kamiya Asaka. He and Kajiwara seem to be fairly close, although she is frightened of him.
Juju Sasaki (佐々木 樹々, Sasaki Juju)
Voiced by: Tomoe Ōmi
Juju is tall, plays guitar, and is terrified of caterpillars. She once thought that dinosaurs breathed fire. She is drawn so that her eyes appear to be perpetually closed, and her general inattentiveness to her surroundings seems to corroborate this possibility.
Suzukaze Combo (涼風コンビ, Suzukaze Konbi)
The Suzukaze Combo is a pair of second-year students who usually appear together and who evidently view life as one long comedy routine. They seem to be aware of their status as comic strip characters, and often address the audience directly, although it has alternatively been suggested that they're just talking to thin air. Their considerable arsenal of jokes, tricks, and gags was at least partially honed under the tutelage of Asakura Soyogi. The pair's routine is often based on popular manzai comedic performances, usually failing to copy that style. The "Suzukaze" nickname derives from an alternate reading of the characters for "Ryō" and "Fū".

Ryō Tanabe (田辺 涼, Tanabe Ryō)
Voiced by: Masumi Asano
Fū Himuro (氷室 風, Himuro Fū)
Voiced by: Natsuko Kuwatani

Nagisa Kurihara (栗原 渚, Kurihara Nagisa)
Voiced by: Yukari Tamura
An inquisitive but easy-going girl with keen biological interests. Kurihara's knowledge of this field is literally encyclopedic, in the sense that it is only limited by what appears in scientific encyclopedias. She identifies and interacts with a variety of plant and animal life, sharing some of their unique characteristics with other club members and with the audience. Her resourcefulness and adaptability have drawn great admiration from Kajiwara. Classmate and best friend of Juju.
Asaka Kamiya (神谷 朝霞, Kamiya Asaka)
Voiced by: Ami Koshimizu
A dangerously imaginative troublemaker with pink hair and a ponytail. In contrast to the other club members, Kamiya's artwork is featured frequently and is a major facet of her character. Her creations usually can only marginally be called art, and are often inspired by puns; among them: a plush screwdriver, a kangaroo costume, a fanning machine, a kiwifruit kiwi, a Maneki Neko beckoning with both paws, and a t-shirt with a hanger attached. She is physically strong. Identified as the "art club's trump card".
Tsukiyo Ōba (大庭 月夜, Ōba Tsukiyo)
Voiced by: Mamiko Noto
A second-year student who attends the art club somewhat infrequently. Ōba has unkempt hair and long bangs which hang over and conceal her face (and obstruct her vision). These factors contribute to her apparent anonymity and forgettability, as other members of the art club often fail to recognize her, both facetiously and otherwise. Although she is not introduced until considerably late in the anime, Ōba often appears throughout the manga.
Ujō Sugyō (須尭 雨情, Sugyō Ujō)
Voiced by: Hideki Tasaka
The art club's president, a senior. He is referred to as simply "President"; his actual name is used so infrequently that newer club members not only forget what it is, but forget that he has one at all. He is the most normal and level-headed character of them all, remaining calm and collected at all times. He is also a responsible student and can speak English.

==== Teachers ====
Hiyori Kasugano (春日野 日和, Kasugano Hiyori)
Voiced by: Ryō Hirohashi
The exceedingly immature art teacher in charge of the club. Unmotivated, unambitious, and uninterested in society's expectations of her, Kasugano plays ball in the art room, cooks food and watches television in the preparation room, tends to forget what year it is, and keeps a pet chicken named Pī-chan. In contrast to her reckless personality, her driving is very slow and deliberate.
Soyogi Asakura (朝倉 そよぎ, Asakura Soyogi)
A friend of Kasugano's, and a fellow art teacher at the high school. Asakura is a talented magician and has demonstrated the capacity to perform extraordinary feats of skill. She at some point served as a mentor to the Suzukaze Combo, who address her as "master" and continue to augment their repertoire of tricks and gags by emulating her. Whereas Kasugano's exact age is never given, Asakura is identified as being 24 years old.

=== Others ===
==== People ====
Ao Kajiwara (梶原 青, Kajiwara Ao)
Voiced by: Sayaka Ohara
Sora's 13-year-old younger brother. He is very caring towards his sister, although he can sometimes become exasperated with her behavior.
Saiun Ueno (上野 彩雲, Ueno Saiun)
Twenty-year-old cousin of Asō, and like her, a Hakata-ben speaker. Ueno was a member of the art club, but has graduated. Usually to be found fishing, or occasionally at home in the high school jersey he still wears.
Masago Shibata (柴田 真砂, Shibata Masago)
Another former art club member, Shibata was Ueno's classmate and is evidently still in contact with him. She is good friends with Kuga, whom she meets on a return visit to the art club. Shibata is the only character to wear glasses.
Sekka Kamiya (神谷 雪花, Kamiya Sekka)
Asaka's elder sister, the cook among the three Kamiya siblings. Not fond of tomatoes or competition.
Raika Kamiya (神谷 雷火, Kamiya Raika)
The 23-year-old elder brother of Asaka and Sekka. While never a member of the art club, he knows Kasugano; he also met Kate and Kajiwara in an art supply store. On a visit to the high school for a parent-teacher conference, he demonstrates himself to be as forgetful and absent-minded as his goofy youngest sister.
Kei Kirishima (霧島 渓, Kirishima Kei)
Kajiwara's friend and classmate. She has shown an inclination towards music and a disinclination towards scholastic pursuits. Remains in the "go-home club" (the term for students not involved in any after-school activities) despite Kasugano's recruitment efforts.
Takane Ogi (小木 高嶺, Ogi Takane)
Another of Kajiwara's classmates. Like Kei, she is in the "go-home club"; also like her, she evinces great sympathetic regard for her friend Sora. Unlike her, she is an excellent student.
Convenience store clerk (コンビニ店員, Konbini tenin)
An unnamed, recurring character who first appears in chapter 1. Outside of his work, he has been spotted purchasing a halogen heater.
Yūko Yayoi (弥生 ゆうこ, Yayoi Yūko)
Voiced by: Sayaka Ōhara
A waitress who introduces herself to Kajiwara, Asō, and Hazuki in the final episode of the animation, after brief appearances in episode 1, 4, and 12. She also appears in the manga, although her name is not revealed until volume 12 while serving Ryou and Fuu.
Minamo Negishi (根岸 みなも, Negishi Minamo)
Voiced by: Yōko Hikasa
Daichi's little sister, a character originally only featured in the anime, but was later introduced into the manga as well. Her habit of carrying a camera to capture scenery and objects of interest is contrasted with Kajiwara's similar practice with the eponymous sketchbook. Though a middle-schooler, she is often assumed to be in elementary school—something of a sore spot.

==== Cats ====
Mike (ミケ)
Voiced by: Tomoko Kaneda
A Hakata-ben speaking calico cat who functions as the protagonist among the cat characters. Mike is noted for her mean glare and rough demeanor, but has a surprisingly weak, cute cry that belies these traits. Her name derives from the Japanese term for a calico cat.
Hā (ハー)
Voiced by: Shizuka Itō
A dark-eyed female, named for the sound of her cry. She has an affected manner of speech, adding "-nya" to the end of each sentence. Initially unable to climb to high places, but seems to have overcome this. Is bilingual, and thus able to communicate with the foreign cat Buchi.
Grey (グレ, Gure)
Voiced by: Sayaka Ōhara
Mike's son, with white and gray fur and thin gray stripes on his back and cheeks. Temporarily a house-cat, but appears to have returned to being a stray. Appears during the anthropomorphic episodes, but remains incapable of speech.
Shamu (シャム)
Though terrified of humans, Shamu is an extremely tough, powerful cat, strong enough to single-handedly defeat the three-cat alliance of Mike, Hā, and Grey. He is not a stray, but an owned cat, and wears a collar.
Shiro (シロ)
Named for his white color. Very affectionate towards humans, and as a result, frequently stepped on.
Kuma (クマ)
Voiced by: Jōji Nakata
Possessing a preternaturally large head, with its features bunched far too close to the center, Kuma is a cat whose species identity is often called into question. He has an overbearing personality and an arrogant manner of speaking, exemplified by his use of the first-person pronoun wagahai. His wish to become a house cat is eventually fulfilled when he is taken in by the Kamiya family. His character contrasts sharply with that of his real-life model, a cute and quiet cat.
Yutanpo (ユタンポ)
Friendly, well-mannered pet cat belonging to Kuga Kokage. Unlike the above-listed cats, has no real-life model. His name means "hot water bottle".
Buchi (ぶち)
Voiced by: Miho Saiki
Kate's pet, a grey and white Persian cat. As a foreigner, Buchi speaks a different language from the native cats ("cat-English") and is only able to communicate with the bilingual Hā.
Nise (ニセ)
Another calico cat named Mike, called Nise ("Imitation") by the original Mike. She resembles Mike, but is far cuter. Kajiwara christens her "Mike II".
Woo (ウー, Ū)
A one-eared tabby cat, named for the sound of his cry. The author, Kobako, met Woo's real-life counterpart in a park.
Bee (ベー)
A third calico - Mike III. Note that the pronunciation is similar to the English word bay rather than bee.
Doku (ドク)
Mike IV.
Jaodd (ジャオッド)
A cat whom Kajiwara attempts to name first "Hā", then "Shiro", before being informed that she has already assigned these names to other cats. Her brother then suggests "Odd" (as in "odd-eyed cat") but Sora mishears this as "Jaodd".

==== Other animals ====
Pii (ピー)
Kasugano's long-suffering pet chicken. Utilized by her as a hat and as a pillow; occasionally threatened to be utilized as food.
Kuro (クロ)
A large, black dog kept by Asō. A lazy, disobedient, and short-sighted animal.
Inuo (犬男)
A small dog who attaches himself to Daichi and is reluctantly taken in by him.
Kururu (クルル)
Asakura's pet dove, whom she often uses in her magic tricks.
Rara (ララ)
Kurihara's pet rat.
Yocchan (ヨっちゃん)
Kurihara has several pet gobies. And they're all called "Yocchan".
Tokunosuke Fukuda (ふくだ とくのすけ, Fukuda Tokunosuke)
A fictional cat with a long body and very small limbs who serves as the mascot character for a bank. Hazuki is enamored with him; her affection for him seems to outweigh even her legendary stinginess, as she will seek out items featuring his likeness even if they are not otherwise useful to her. Appears to have a female counterpart.

== Media ==
=== Manga ===
Sketchbook began as a four-panel manga series written and illustrated by Totan Kobako. It was first serialized in Mag Garden's Monthly Comic Blade magazine starting with the April 2002 issue. The manga has made additional appearances in another manga magazine published by Mag Garden named Comic Blade Masamune. An additional volume, Sketchbook Shucchōban, was published on January 10, 2006, as a collection of bonus material which initially appeared in Comic Blade Masamune. When Comic Blade ceased publication with the September 2014 issue, Sketchbook continued serialization in the online version of Comic Blade, in addition to a concurrent serialization in Mag Garden's Monthly Comic Garden magazine with the October 2014 issue up until the July 2019 issue. The manga is published in Taiwan in Chinese by Tong Li Publishing.

==== Volume list ====
| No. | Release date | ISBN |
|---|---|---|
| 1 | May 10, 2003 | 978-4-901926-50-8 |
Chapters 1-11
| 2 | January 11, 2005 | 978-4-86127-109-0 |
Chapters 14-26
| 3 | January 10, 2006 | 978-4-86127-229-5 |
Chapters 29-44
| 4 | September 10, 2007 | 978-4-86127-426-8 |
Chapters 45-60
| 5 | March 28, 2008 | 978-4-86127-491-6 |
Chapters 67-70
| 6 | June 10, 2009 | 978-4-86127-630-9 |
Chapters 72-85
| 7 | October 9, 2010 | 978-4-86127-776-4 |
| 8 | January 10, 2012 | 978-4-86127-930-0 (limited edition); 978-4-86127-934-8 (regular edition) |
| 9 | May 10, 2013 | 978-4-80000-117-7 (limited edition); 978-4-80000-149-8 (regular edition) |
| 10 | June 3, 2014 | 978-4-80000-296-9 (limited edition); 978-4-80000-318-8 (regular edition) |
| 11 | May 9, 2015 | 978-4-80000-455-0 |
| 12 | October 8, 2016 | 978-4-80000-619-6 |
| 13 | July 10, 2018 | 978-4-80000-786-5 |
| 14 | September 10, 2019 | 978-4-80000-894-7 |

=== Anime ===
An anime television series adaptation, under the title Sketchbook ~full color's~, was animated at Hal Film Maker, written by Mari Okada, and directed by Yoshimasa Hiraike. The series aired 13 episodes in Japan between October 2 and December 25, 2007, on TV Tokyo. Four pieces of theme music are used for the episodes; two opening themes and two ending themes. The first opening theme is "Kaze Sagashi" (風さがし) by Natsumi Kiyoura which is used for most of the episodes, and the second opening theme used only for episode 12 is "Natsu no Kioku" (夏の記憶) by Natsumi Kiyoura. The first ending theme is "Sketchbook o Motta mama" (スケッチブックを持ったまま) by Yui Makino which is used for the first 12 episodes, and the second ending theme used for episode 13 is "Tanpopo Suisha" (たんぽぽ水車) by Kana Hanazawa, Asuka Nakase, and Yui Makino. Other music used in the series is composed by Ken Muramatsu. The anime was initially licensed by Nozomi Entertainment for a DVD release in September 2015. AnimEigo recently license rescued it and they will release the series on Blu-ray in 2026.

==== Episode list ====
| No. | Title | Original release date |
|---|---|---|
| 1 | "The Girl With The Sketchbook" "Suketchibukku no Shōjo" (スケッチブックの少女) | October 2, 2007 |
| 2 | "Everyday Scenery" "Itsumo no Fūkei" (いつもの風景) | October 9, 2007 |
| 3 | "Ao's Worry" "Ao no Shinpai" (青の心配) | October 16, 2007 |
| 4 | "Sketch Competition Between Three People" "Sannin Dake no Suketchi Taikai" (三人だけのスケッチ大会) | October 23, 2007 |
| 5 | "Kitty Cat Day" "Neko Neko no Hi" (ねこねこの日) | October 30, 2007 |
| 6 | "Summer Memories" "Natsu no Omoide" (夏の想ひ出) | November 6, 2007 |
| 7 | "One September Day..." "Kugatsu no Hi ni..." (9月の日に...) | November 13, 2007 |
| 8 | "A Radio-cassette and Young Girl Double Feature" "Rajikase to Shōjo no Nihondate" (ラジカセと少女の二本立て) | November 20, 2007 |
| 9 | "For the Sake of Something" "Nanika no Tame ni" (ナニかの為に) | November 27, 2007 |
| 10 | "Prior Meeting" "Deai no Saki" (出会いの先) | December 4, 2007 |
| 11 | "A Day With a Cold, and Kitty Cat Part 3" "Kaze no Hi to Nekoneko part3" (風邪の日と、ねこねこpart3) | December 11, 2007 |
| 12 | "Sketchbook Day" "Suketchibukku no Hi" (スケッチブックの日) | December 18, 2007 |
| 13 | "Lonely Art Club" "Hitoribocchi no Bijutsubu" (ひとりぼっちの美術部) | December 25, 2007 |

== Reception ==
The series was received positively. Paul Jensen of Anime News Network described the series as an "easygoing slice of life comedy". Gabriella Ekens said that the viewers will either love or be bored by the series, as it focuses on "cute schoolgirls getting into soft-shaded, pun-based antics" and compared it to Azumanga Daioh while noting it is based on a 4koma. Ekens added that the series is "less surreal and more restrained" than Azumanga Daioh and looks "more dated" than it is, due to its "color palette," making it look like "something from the early 2000s", while noting the character designs as "decidely retro", possibly putting of fans who like brighter color aesthetics in series such as Non Non Biyori, and saying that the main cast are likable, while being the "definition of gentleness," falling into the cute girls doing cute things sub-genre.
