= Living for the Day After Tomorrow =

Manga

- The cover of the first manga volume.

あさっての方向。 (Asatte no Hōkō)
- Genre: Drama, Fantasy, Romance
- Manga
- Written by: J-ta Yamada
- Published by: Mag Garden
- Magazine: Comic Blade Masamune
- Original run: March 3, 2005 – June 15, 2007
- Volumes: 5
- Anime television series
- Directed by: Katsushi Sakurabi
- Written by: Seishi Minakami
- Music by: Shinkichi Mitsumune
- Studio: J.C.Staff
- Licensed by: NA: Sentai Filmworks
- Original network: TBS
- Original run: October 5, 2006 – December 21, 2006
- Episodes: 12

Living for the Day After Tomorrow (あさっての方向。, Asatte no Hōkō) is a Japanese manga series written and illustrated by J-ta Yamada. The manga was serialized in Mag Garden's magazine Comic Blade Masamune between March 3, 2005, and June 15, 2007; five bound volumes were released in Japan. The manga was adapted into an anime series produced by J.C.Staff, which aired in Japan between October and December 2006. The story is about a young girl who grows older into an adult, and an adult woman who becomes younger, turning into a child. The anime is licensed by Sentai Filmworks, and a complete series boxset was distributed by Section23 Films on DVD on April 13, 2010.

== Plot ==
Asatte no Hōkō follows the lives of Karada Iokawa, a young girl who is set to join junior high school after summer is over, and Shōko Nogami, a young woman who has just returned from studying abroad, who also happens to be the former girlfriend of Karada's older brother. The day Shōko returns, she is dragged by Karada to the beach with her brother and a couple of their friends since she used to know Karada's brother Hiro several years before.

After becoming irritated with Hiro for leaving her alone in the United States, she purposefully tells Karada that her ribbons are childish. This upsets her greatly because she doesn't like to be treated as a child. Later that same day, Karada is found by Shōko praying at a shrine, wishing to become older. Amazingly, Karada's wish becomes true and she instantly transforms into a young woman. Incidentally, Shōko then has her adulthood taken away from her and she reverts to about eleven years old.

== Characters ==
Karada Iokawa (五百川 からだ, Iokawa Karada)
Voiced by: Ayumi Fujimura
Karada is a cheerful young girl who is about to enter her first year of junior high school. Her adopted parents died when she was two years old, and since then she has lived with her older brother, Hiro. Despite her age, she has learned to cook and do house chores herself. Her wish to not be a burden on her brother, combined with her knowledge (unknown to Hiro) that she is only an adoptive sibling, drives her to wish to become an adult. Her friend and classmate, Tetsumasa, seems to have feelings for her. After hearing Tetsu's confession to her (in her adult form), she also falls in love with Tetsu shortly afterwards.
Shōko Nogami (野上 椒子, Nogami Shōko)
Voiced by: Shizuka Itō
Shōko is a young woman who has just recently returned from overseas in the United States. She first meets Karada at the shrine that contained a fated wishing stone. She used to be Hiro's girlfriend; she met him while in America and it seems that they were very close. Hiro told her that he would return right after his parents' funeral, but she waited for months and then received a letter saying he would not be coming back. She did not know Hiro had a younger sister. She wished to become a child, without knowing herself that she really wished for it. She starts to get attached to Karada after she knows her properly.
Hiro Iokawa (五百川 尋, Iokawa Hiro)
Voiced by: Satoshi Hino
Hiro is a young man who was Shōko's boyfriend when he was studying abroad. They went to the same university in Boston. He had to leave in order to attend to his parents' funeral, and never came back because he had to stay in Japan to take care of his sister, Karada. Several months later, he sent a letter to Shōko saying he would never come back, but without explaining the reason. It is later revealed that he is not really Karada's older brother, but met her for the first time at his parents' funeral. He thought that he would return to America right after the funeral, but after meeting her, he could not leave her alone. He works in a pharmacy.
Tetsumasa Amino (網野 徹允, Amino Tetsumasa)
Voiced by: Katsuhiro Nomura
Often called just "Tetsu," he is Karada's classmate and one of her closest friends. Tetsu is quite tall, and jokes that he is sometimes mistaken for a high school student. It is implied that he loves Karada—when Karada "went missing" after she became older, he ran all over town to find her. He does not like Hiro because he interferes in Tetsu and Karada's moments together.
Tōko Amino (網野 透子, Amino Tōko)
Voiced by: Akeno Watanabe
Tōko is Tetsu's older sister, also a friend of Karada and Hiro. She works at the coffee house Hiro often visits.
Kotomi Shiozaki (汐崎 琴美, Shiozaki Kotomi)
Voiced by: Ami Koshimizu
Tetsu and Tōko's relative, a spunky, spontaneous young girl. Although she talks smoothly near Tetsu's mother, outside of her hearing she is another person. She is an original character in the anime and thus was never in the manga version.

== Media ==
=== Manga ===
The manga series is written and illustrated by J-ta Yamada and was serialized from March 3, 2005, to June 15, 2007, in Mag Garden's monthly Comic Blade Masamune magazine, and spanned five volumes, with the final volume released on September 9, 2007. Compared to the anime adapted from it, the manga includes more personal drama between the leads, and introduces several more characters who are also vying for the Wishing Stone. It also clarifies several points which are left ambiguous in the anime, such as the precise nature of the relationship between Hiro and Karada.

=== Anime ===
An anime adaptation was produced by J.C.Staff and directed by Katsushi Sakurabi. The broadcast started in Japan between October 5 and December 21, 2006, on TBS. It made its Animax Asia debut on January 2, 2009, under the title Living for the Day After Tomorrow with an English dub. The series is licensed by Sentai Filmworks, and a complete series box set was distributed by Section23 Films on DVD on April 13, 2010.

Two pieces of theme music were used for the anime; one opening theme and one ending theme. The opening theme is "Hikari no Kisetsu" (光の季節, Season of Light) by Suara and the ending theme is "Sweet Home Song" (スイートホームソング, Suīto Hōmu Songu) by Yūmao. Two image song albums were released sung by the voice actresses from the anime. The first album was released on December 6, 2006, featuring songs by Ayumi Fujimura (who voiced Karada Iokawa); while most of the album is by Ayumi Fujimura, the last song, "Namida Gumo", is sung by Suara. The second image song album followed by January 11, 2007, with songs by Shizuka Itō (who voiced Shōko Nogami); both albums were released by Lantis in Japan.

==== Episodes ====
No.	Title	Original release date
1	"The Wishing Stones"; Transliteration: "Negai Ishi" (Japanese: 願い石)	October 5, 2006
Shōko returns to Japan, and soon meets Karada and Hiro. They and their friends goes to the beach. After seeing Shōko's silence in front of Hiro, Tōko asks what was wrong. Shōko responds loud and when Karada tries to solve the matter in between them, Shōko tells her that she is very small for that. Hiro buys Karada some Hair Ribbons and for suggestion she goes to Shōko. She responds again ending up that Karada is childish. Karada gets humiliated and is soon cheered up by Tetsu. When Hiro and Shōko talk in private, Shōko slaps him and runs away. As soon as the moon shines, Karada grows into an adult as Shōko grows younger into a child.
2	"A Passing Encounter"; Transliteration: "Surechigai" (Japanese: すれちがい)	October 12, 2006
Karada and Shōko switch ages after Karada wishes to become older. Hiro spends the entire day and night trying to find Karada, only to later encounter Shōko and Karada, whom he doesn't recognize.
3	"A New Lifestyle"; Transliteration: "Atarashii Seikatsu" (Japanese: あたらしい生活)	October 19, 2006
Shōko and Karada begin adjusting to their new situation. Hiro, still looking for Karada, goes to Shōko's apartment. There, he mistakes Shōko to be her little sister, but later finds out about the age switch. Some of Shōko's past with Hiro is revealed.
4	"I Want You to Believe"; Transliteration: "Shinjite Hoshii" (Japanese: 信じてほしい)	October 26, 2006
Hiro is forced into believing Karada and Shōkō's age switch, which is quite hard for Karada. They later go to the Summer Festival and reach an understanding.
5	"A Place to Return To"; Transliteration: "Kaeru Tokoro" (Japanese: 帰るところ)	November 2, 2006
Karada persuades Shōkō to come live with her and her older brother. Shōkō meets Kotomi, who tries to make her play with the kids. Meanwhile, Tetsu is being forced into staying home studying while he wants to look for Karada.
6	"The Eternal Summer"; Transliteration: "Natsu no Eien" (Japanese: 夏の永遠)	November 9, 2006
Tetsu goes to Karada's apartment to look for her and even talks with her himself, but he doesn't recognize her. The rest of the day, they go around town together to places Karada might be and end up in a hidden place where the source of the river's water is.
7	"A Moment For The Two"; Transliteration: "Futari no Tsukanoma" (Japanese: 二人のつかのま)	November 16, 2006
Hiro's birthday comes around and Karada decides to bake him a cake for the occasion and Shōkō helps her. All the while Shōkō cannot forget about her past with Hiro.
8	""Towards The Day After Next""; Transliteration: "Asatte no Hōkō" (Japanese: あさっての方向)	November 23, 2006
Karada leaves and tries to live on her own but very soon finds out how hard it really is. During a rainstorm, she remembers the past she had with her parents and when she first met Hiro.
9	"Signpost"; Transliteration: "Michishirube" (Japanese: みちしるべ)	November 30, 2006
Karada starts to work at a pension in order to live on herself. Meanwhile, Tetsu is still on the search for Karada and this time even Kotomi is helping him out.
10	"Real Name"; Transliteration: "Hontō no Namae" (Japanese: 本当の名前)	December 7, 2006
Tetsu is still eager to search for Karada, and does not even realize he has already met her. When it starts to rain and he has not come back yet, Karada goes out to search for him.
11	"The Present At That Place"; Transliteration: "Soko ni Aru Genzai" (Japanese: そこにある現在)	December 14, 2006
After Tetsu gets over his cold, Karada finally tells him her true identity, though Tetsu doesn't believe her. After coming to terms with what he did to Shōko, Hiro and she take a train together to go see Karada.
12	"The Things That Are Here"; Transliteration: "Koko ni Iru Koto" (Japanese: ここにいること)	December 21, 2006
Eventually Tetsu believes that Karada was turned into an adult. As Kotomi leaves the town to see her father, she gives Shōko a piece of the wishing stone she had. It is implied that they reversed the age switch, and the last shot is of the wishing stone fading into dust.
