= Sakura Kinoshita =

Japanese manga artist

Sakura Kinoshita 木下さくら
- Area: Manga artist
- Notable works: Matantei Loki Ragnarok, Tactics
- Collaborators: Kazuko Higashiyama

Sakura Kinoshita (木下さくら, Kinoshita Sakura; born September 8) is a Japanese manga artist. She is most famous for two of her works: Matantei Loki Ragnarok and Tactics (with Kazuko Higashiyama).

== Biography ==
Kinoshita wrote Matantei Loki Ragnarok, a story about the titular Norse god of mischief who was exiled to Earth and runs a paranormal detective agency to collect evil auras that have taken over human hearts. The manga series ran in the magazine Monthly Shōnen Gangan from August 1999 to October 2004, and was collected in 7 tankōbon volumes by Gangan Comics. It was also adopted into an anime television series that ran in 2003. Loki was later purchased by publishing company MAG Garden and moved to Comic Blade magazine, where Kinoshita wrote five more volumes under the name The Mythical Detective Loki Ragnarok.

Kinoshita's other major work was with Kazuko Higashiyama on the manga series Tactics, which follows the adventures of a boy who is able to see youkai and mythical beasts, and who goes on a mission to find and master an oni-eating tengu. The manga was serialized in Comic Blade Masamune, and later Monthly Comic Avarus and Monthly GFantasy, running from 2001 to 2013, and was published by Mag Garden in 15 volumes. It was also adapted into an anime series.

== Works ==
Title	Year	Notes	Refs
The Mythical Detective Loki	2002–03	Serialized by Monthly Shōnen Gangan; Published by Square Enix in 7 volumes	
The Mythical Detective Loki Ragnarok	2002–04	Serialized by Monthly Comic Blade; Published by Mag Garden in 5 volumes	
Tactics	2001–13	Serialized inComic Blade Masamune, Monthly Comic Avarus and Monthly GFantasy. Published by Mag Garden in 15 volumes.	
