= JK Haru Is a Sex Worker in Another World =

Japanese novel series

- First novel volume cover

JKハルは異世界で娼婦になった (JK Haru wa Isekai de Shōfu ni Natta)
- Genre: Isekai
- Novel series
- Written by: Kō Hiratori
- Published by: Shōsetsuka ni Narō
- Original run: October 26, 2016 – August 2, 2017
- Novel series
- Written by: Kō Hiratori
- Illustrated by: shimano
- Published by: Hayakawa Publishing
- English publisher: NA: J-Novel Club
- Imprint: Hayakawa Bunko JA
- Original run: December 6, 2017 – December 4, 2019
- Volumes: 2
- Manga
- Written by: Kō Hiratori
- Illustrated by: J-ta Yamada
- Published by: Shinchosha
- English publisher: NA: Seven Seas Entertainment
- Imprint: Bunch Comics
- Magazine: Manga Ōkoku
- Original run: June 14, 2019 – September 22, 2023
- Volumes: 7
- icon

JK Haru Is a Sex Worker in Another World (Japanese: JKハルは異世界で娼婦になった, Hepburn: JK Haru wa Isekai de Shōfu ni Natta) is a Japanese novel by Kō Hiratori, first published in Japan as a web novel from October 2016 to August 2017 on the website Shōsetsuka ni Narō. It was later acquired by Hayakawa Publishing, who published it in December 2017 with cover art by shimano. The novel follows the high school student Haru Koyama, who is transported to another world after her death, where she begins work as a sex worker.

A second volume titled JK Haru Is a Sex Worker in Another World: Summer, which is a collection of several short stories that complement the main story, was published in December 2019. The novel has also been adapted into a manga series, illustrated by J-ta Yamada.

== Plot ==
The Japanese high school student Haru Koyama and her male classmate Seiji Chiba are killed in a traffic accident and are teleported to another world together. While Chiba becomes an adventurer and goes out to slay monsters, Haru discovers that women aren't allowed to have special powers in the new world, so she decides to make a living as a sex worker.

== Characters ==
Haru Koyama (小山ハル, Koyama Haru)
A popular 17-year-old high school girl who died and got transported to another world upon being hit by a truck. Afterward, lacking an education in this world and seemingly not having any special powers, she finds that her only career options are becoming a slave or working as a prostitute at a brothel; she chooses the latter. Although facing constant struggle in this medieval world where women are treated as second-class citizens, she tries her best to stay positive and make the most of her situation.
In the side story, immediately after giving birth to the Demon King's child, she returns to her original world. She lives an ordinary life with no memory of the other world, yet she suffers from vague, lingering traces of her experiences there. Ultimately, she regains her memories and abilities, returns to the other world, reunites with her five-year-old daughter, and lives as a singer.

== Media ==
JK Haru Is a Sex Worker in Another World is written by Kō Hiratori. It started as a web novel on the website Shōsetsuka ni Narō in October 2016. In December 2017, it was acquired by Hayakawa Publishing, who published it in print with cover art by shimano. In North America, the publisher J-Novel Club licensed the series and published it as an e-book in English.

A manga adaptation, illustrated by J-ta Yamada, started on June 14, 2019. It was serialized on the Manga Ōkoku website under its Utsutsu label. It was published by Shinchosha in seven volumes in the tankōbon format from November 2019 to December 2023. Seven Seas Entertainment licensed the manga in North America and will publish it under its Ghost Ship imprint.

== Reception ==
JK Haru Is a Sex Worker in Another World won an award in the doujinshi, or private publication category at the BookWalker Grand Prix Awards 2019 from digital publisher BookWalker. The work was also BookWalker's sixth best-selling e-book of 2019. In the 2019 edition of the annually published light novel guide Kono Light Novel ga Sugoi!, JK Haru Is a Sex Worker in Another World was listed at number seven in the tankobon category.

Kim Morrissy wrote in her column "The Best (and worst) Isekai Light Novels" on Anime News Network that JK Haru Is a Sex Worker in Another World is embracing the isekai genre in a much darker and more deranged manner as a commentary on the genre. In it, the female protagonist Haru is thrown into a misogynist fantasy world and has to work as a prostitute to survive, while her classmate, who has also been teleported into this world, is endowed with superhuman powers. Morrissy interprets this as a mirror for how these medieval-looking worlds of this genre are particularly restrictive towards women, while male characters are not confronted with such situations due to their privileges.
