= Monthly Comic Garden =

Japanese manga magazine

- October 2016 issue of Monthly Comic Garden
- Categories: Shōnen manga
- Frequency: Monthly
- Publisher: Mag Garden
- First issue: September 1, 2014
- Country: Japan
- Language: Japanese
- Website: www.mag-garden.co.jp/comic-garden/

Monthly Comic Garden (月刊コミックガーデン) is a Japanese manga magazine published by Mag Garden. It was first published on September 1, 2014, replacing the defunct Comic Blade.

== Series ==
- Amadeus Code
- The Ancient Magus' Bride (transferred to Bushiroad Works' Comic Growl)
- Chichi Kogusa
- Dora Kuma
- The Girl From the Other Side: Siúil, a Rún
- Grisaia no Kajitsu ~L'oiseau bleu~
- The Kingdoms of Ruin
- Kitsune to Tanuki to Iinazuke
- Kohaku no Yume de Yoimashō (Kei Sugimura, Nodoka Yoda, Masoho Murano) (ongoing)
- Kuroa Chimera (Kairi Sorano)
- Laughing Under the Clouds (Kemuri Karakara)
- M3 the dark metal
- Mars Red
- Night of the Living Cat
- Peacemaker Kurogane (Nanae Chrono) (ongoing)
- Princess Lucia
- Psycho-Pass: Kanshikan Shinya Kogami
- Psycho-Pass 2
- Rain
- Rengoku ni Warau (Kemuri Karakara)
- The Rolling Girls
- Shiina-kun no Torikemo Hyakka
- Shūten Unknown (Shiho Sugiura)
- Sketchbook
- The Skull Dragon's Precious Daughter (ongoing)
- Shimoneta to Iu Gainen ga Sonzai Shinai Taikutsu na Sekai: Manmaruhen (manga-hen)

== See also ==
- List of manga magazines
