= Totan Kobako =

Japanese manga artist

Totan Kobako (小箱とたん, Kobako Totan) is the pen name of a Japanese manga artist from Fukuoka, Japan. He is best known as the creator of Sketchbook which was adapted into a 13 episode anime television series by the studio Hal Film Maker and broadcast on TV Tokyo.

== Works ==
- Sketchbook (スケッチブック, Suketchibukku) (2002-2019, serialized in Comic Blade, Mag Garden)
- Scorebook: Totan Kobako Short Story Anthology (スコアブック 小箱とたん作品集) (2007, Mag Garden)
