= J-ta Yamada =

Japanese manga artist

J-ta Yamada (山田 J太 or 山田 ジェイ太, Yamada Jeita; born January 26) is a Japanese manga artist. Yamada is known for creating the manga Asatte no Houkou, which also spawned an anime. Yamada also created the manga Majina! and the manga Gifuto.

He has created a mahjong game called Higurashi no Naku Koro ni Jong, which is based on 07th Expansion's Higurashi When They Cry. It began appearing once a month in Takeshobo's Kindai Mahjong magazine starting on January 1, 2010.

== Works ==
=== Books ===
- Code Geass: Lelouch of the Rebellion — Knight: Official Comic Anthology For Girls, Volume 1 (コードギアス 反逆のルルーシュ 公式コミックアンソロジー Knight, Asuka Comics DX) — Manga Contribution
- JK Haru is a Sex Worker in Another World (JKハルは異世界で娼婦になった, Hayakawa Bunko JP) — Cover Illustration
- JK Haru is a Sex Worker in Another World, Manga (JKハルは異世界で娼婦になった, BUNCH COMICS) — Art

=== Games ===
- Aquarian Age (Broccoli) — Card Illustration
- Kemomimi Panic (Arclight) — Card Illustration
- Kuni Tori! Gaiden (Arclight) — Card Illustration
- Tanto Cuore: Romantic Vacation (Arclight) — Card Illustration
