= Tactics (manga) =

Japanese manga series

- Manga
- Written by: Sakura Kinoshita; Kazuko Higashiyama
- Published by: Enix; Mag Garden
- English publisher: NA: ADV Manga; Tokyopop; JManga
- Magazine: Monthly GFantasy (former); Monthly Comic Blade (former); Comic Blade Masamune (former); Monthly Comic Avarus (current); Kurofune (current)
- Original run: 2000 – present
- Volumes: 15
- Anime television series
- Directed by: Hiroshi Watanabe
- Studio: Studio Deen
- Licensed by: NA: Manga Entertainment; UK: Manga Entertainment
- Original network: TV Tokyo
- English network: US: Sci-Fi Channel
- Original run: October 5, 2004 – March 29, 2005
- Episodes: 25
- icon

Tactics (stylized as tactics) is a Japanese manga series written as a collaboration between Sakura Kinoshita and Kazuko Higashiyama. It was serialized in Comic Blade Masamune. Kinoshita supplied the character "Kantarou", and Higashiyama supplied the character "Haruka". While the manga was previously licensed for released in English in paperback by both ADV Manga and Tokyopop, the manga was only available in English in digital format on JManga for two years before it was no longer accessible.

The animation studio Studio Deen adapted the Tactics manga into a 25-episode anime series, which ran on Japanese television from October 5, 2004, to March 29, 2005. The English dub of the anime was distributed by Manga Entertainment in the United States, Canada and the United Kingdom.

Tactics resumed serialization on January 18, 2018, as a web manga on Pixiv.

== Plot ==
Set in Japan during the late Meiji period, Tactics is the story of Kantarou Ichinomiya, a young man with the ability to see youkai and other mythical beasts. When he was a child, this ability resulted in him being ostracized by humans. His youkai friends told him that in order to be stronger, he must find the oni-eating tengu. The young Kantarou then vows to find it and name it. By naming one, a human becomes master and the name contract is only broken if the master chooses. As Kantarou grows up, he finds a career as a folklorist and a part-time exorcist, alongside his youkai friend Youko. An assignment leads Kantarou to a mountain where a shrine marks the place where the tengu had been sealed away. Calling upon the tengu by the name Haruka, Kantarou breaks the seal and becomes Haruka's master. As time goes on, Kantarou, Youko, and Haruka develop a close friendship. However, this relationship is threatened by Haruka's returning memories and his yearning to know more about his past.

== Characters ==
Kantarou Ichinomiya (一ノ宮勘太郎, Ichinomiya Kantarō)
Voiced by: Kōki Miyata (Japanese); Blake Shepard (English)
Kantarou is a young folklorist and part-time exorcist with an ability to see youkai. Kantarou is highly intelligent and is quite sneaky and manipulative. He is able to trick others into doing what he wants and anticipate their reactions. This trait has resulted in him being called a tactician by Haruka, hence the title of the series. Despite this, Kantarou has a good heart and feels deeply for youkai. Although it is customary for an exorcist to kill youkai, Kantarou chooses to reason with them and sees his line of work as a way to help them. His attitude has been criticized by both Haruka and Sugino, as they feel it may endanger him.
Haruka (春華, Haruka)
Voiced by: Takahiro Sakurai (Japanese); Chris Patton (English)
Haruka is an oni-eating tengu, the strongest of all youkai. Kantarou, having named him, became his master and friend. Haruka has the ability to control lightning. Occasionally, such as when he is attacking oni, Haruka can transfigure into his true youkai form. His nails grow sharper and longer, his fangs grow longer, and his eyes constrict. Usually, he appears as a tall, dark-haired man with black wings that he can either hide or reveal. Haruka is troubled by his lack of memories, inability to eat youkai, and loss of power, which starts to affect his sense of self. Haruka's name under his previous master, an onmyōdō practitioner, was Rin. As Rin, he did not have a good relationship with his master, and it is hinted that she took advantage of his subservient status for sexual purposes.
Youko (ヨーコ, Yōko)
Voiced by: Tomoko Kawakami (Japanese); Luci Christian (English)
Youko is a female kitsune youkai whom Kantarou named. At the beginning of Tactics, Youko had already been living with Kantarou. She is loud and impulsive, and often loses her temper towards Kantaoru. Youko has the ability to make her fox ears appear and disappear at will, and can turn into her fox form if she wishes. Youko is shown to be deeply concerned about the household expenses and pesters Kantarou about finishing his book manuscripts. Before joining Kantarou, Youko was initially a lonely youkai who deceived travellers into thinking she was a member of their family. Youko pretends to be Kantarou's wife, but Kantarou soon reveals her to be a youkai, and invites her to join his household.
Suzu Edogawa (江戸川珠洲, Edogawa Suzu)
Voiced by: Nana Mizuki (Japanese); Jessica Boone (English)
Suzu is a rich teenage girl who constantly helps Katarou on his cases. She first met him in episode 1 and after that usually hangs out in his house. Suzu is often addressed as "Suzu-chan" and she maintains a very close relationship with Youko. She has a crush on Haruka, but often treats Kantarou harshly. Her character was created for the anime, but she has appeared in several of the manga's omake since.
Sugino (スギノ様, Sugino-sama)
Voiced by: Soichiro Hoshi (Japanese); Vic Mignogna (English)
Sugino is a white tengu and the "god" of Sugino Village. As such, he is often called Sugino-sama. Unlike a black tengu, who is born a tengu, a white tengu is originally a powerful, overly-proud human priest or monk who changed into a tengu. Before Kantarou, Sugino had attempted to break Haruka's seal, but failed. Sugino has a great amount of dislike for the human race, having been a human himself. Sugino is married to Muu-chan, a small, green youkai. Upon being asked how they would reproduce, Sugino states that their relationship is platonic. Prior to meeting Muu-chan, Sugino was a cruel character who earned the nickname of 'violent tengu'. His cruelty caused him to be lonely and hate his immortality.
Muu-chan (むーちゃん, Mū-chan)
Voiced by: Omi Minami (Japanese); Monica Rial (English)
Muu-chan is a small, green youkai who is married to Sugino and only says 'Muu'. Muu-chan has the ability to vacuum up demons and spells using its mouth.
Raikou Minamoto (源頼光, Minamoto Raikou)
A handsome young wealthy nobleman, main opponent of series. He is the leader of the government's Demon Extermination Squad. He wants to make Kantarou cancel his name contract with Haruka so Haruka will get his memories back and become the "real" demon eating tengu he wishes to defeat. He hates that Kantarou was able to unseal the demon-eating tengu but he himself could not. He wields Minamoto's Legendary sword. His allies are Watanabe and Ibaragi.

== Media ==
=== Manga ===
The manga was first released in North America by ADV Manga in 2004. Afterwards, the US license was transferred to Tokyopop, who released 8 volumes before they shut down their American branch. Volumes 1–12 were available on JManga until its closure in May 2013.

Volume list

No.	Original release date	Original ISBN	English release date	English ISBN
01	September 10, 2002	4-901926-02-0	October 4, 2004 (ADV Manga); April 10, 2007 (Tokyopop)	978-1-4139-0178-8 (ADV Manga); ISBN 978-1-59816-960-7 (Tokyopop)
02	September 10, 2002	4-901926-03-9	May 24, 2005 (ADV Manga); August 7, 2007 (Tokyopop)	978-1-4139-0179-5 (ADV Manga); ISBN 978-1-59816-961-4 (Tokyopop)
03	March 10, 2003	4-901926-41-1	December 11, 2007	978-1-59816-962-1
04	March 10, 2004	4-86127-034-0	March 11, 2008	978-1-59816-963-8
05	October 9, 2004	4-86127-085-5	June 10, 2008	978-1-59816-964-5
06	March 10, 2005	4-86127-127-4	September 9, 2008	978-1-59816-965-2
07	September 10, 2005	4-86127-198-3	December 9, 2008	978-1-59816-966-9
08	July 10, 2006	4-86127-288-2	December 29, 2009	978-1-4278-0200-2
09	March 30, 2007	4-86127-375-7	—	—
10	March 28, 2008	4-86127-487-7	—	—
11	March 10, 2009	4-86127-604-7	—	—
12	March 10, 2010	4-86127-717-5	—	—
13	March 15, 2011	4-86127-845-7	—	—
14	March 15, 2012	4-86127-968-2	—	—
15	May 15, 2013	4-80000-163-3	—	—

=== Anime ===
Tactics originally aired in Japan on TV Tokyo from October 5, 2004, to March 29, 2005. The series consists of 25 episodes. The series was directed by Hiroshi Watanabe and was produced by Studio Deen. Tactics was licensed for English release and distributed by Manga Entertainment.

In the United States, it was featured on the Ani-Monday program from January 7, 2008, to April 21, 2008, on the Sci Fi Channel. The opening theme for Tactics was Secret World and the ending theme was "Mienai Chikara" (ミエナイチカラ, Invisible Strength). Both were sung by Miki Akiyama.

Anime production staff

- Director: Hiroshi Watanabe
- Series composition: Kenichi Kanemaki
- Dubbing director: Kazuhiko Inoue
- Script: Kanemaki Kenichi
- Screenplay: Hiroyuki Kawasaki, Katsuhiko Takayama, Masashi Kubota, Masashi Suzuki
- Storyboard: Chiaki Ima, Hiroshi Watanabe, Masashi Kojima, Mitsuko Oyake, Shinpei Miyashita
- Episode director: Chiaki Ima, Hiroshi Watanabe, Shigeru Ueda
- Music: Kei Haneoka
- Character design: Mariko Oka
- Art director: Michiyo Akutsu
- Chief animation director: Mariko Oka
- Animation director: Minefumi Harada, Miyako Tsuji, Youichi Ishikawa, Yukiko Ban
- Director of Photography: Akio Abe

=== Music ===
A CD for season 1 of the Tactics anime was released on June 27, 2006

Opening Theme
"Secret World"
Lyrics by: Yuriko Mori
Composition by: Kazuya Nishioka
Arrangement by: Kazuya Nishioka
Performed by: Miki Akiyama
Ending Theme
"Invisible Strength" (ミエナイチカラ, Mienai Chikara)
Lyrics by: Yuriko Mori
Composition by: Kazuya Nishioka
Arrangement by: Kazuya Nishioka
Performed by: Miki Akiyama

=== Light Novels ===
Three official light novels exist, all written by Nanami Nari, with the approval of Sakura Kinoshita and Kazuko Higashiyama. They have remained unlocalized, and do not possess English titles. They are published by Mag Garden Novels, a subsidiary of Mag Garden.

- 小説 tactics［天狗祭嫁取伝説異聞］（本文：七海鳴）
- 小説 tactics 第2巻［巷説妖狐残夢奇譚］（本文：七海鳴）
- 小説 tactics 第3巻［鬼種異界流離咒歌］（本文：七海鳴）
