= List of Monochrome Factor episodes =

Cover of Monochrome Factor 's first DVD volume released by Shochiku on August 8, 2008.

The episodes of the Japanese anime series Monochrome Factor are directed by Yuu Kou, produced by Genco, and animated by A.C.G.T. The anime is an adaptation of Kaili Sorano's manga of the same name, which is currently serialized in the manga magazine, Comic Blade Avarus. The story revolves around high school student Akira Nikaido, who, upon meeting a mysterious man named Shirogane, must become a "shin", or creature of the shadow world, in order to restore balance between the human and shadow worlds.

The anime premiered on the Japanese television network TV Tokyo on April 7, 2008. The last of the 24 episodes aired on September 29, 2008. Though the episodes aired on TV Tokyo first, the series also aired on other networks such as AT-X and TV Osaka within days of the original broadcast. Shochiku distributed the episodes in an eight-DVD set, with each compilation containing three episodes. The first volume was released on August 8, 2008, and the eighth on March 13, 2009.

Three pieces of theme music are used for the episodes: one opening theme and two ending themes. The opening theme, "Metamorphose", is performed by Asriel and written by Kokomi. The ending themes are "Awake ~my everything~" (AWAKE 〜僕のすべて〜, Awake ~boku no subete~) by Daisuke Ono and Hiroshi Kamiya, and "Kakuse ~Dark and Light~" (Kakuse 〜Dark and Light〜) by Junichi Suwabe and Katsuyuki Konishi. Both ending themes are written by Yumi Matsuzawa, and the four performing artists are also voice actors for the series. Asriel released a single for "Metamorphose" on April 23, 2008. The singles for "Awake ~my everything~" and "Kakuse ~Dark and Light~" were released on May 28 and August 27 of 2008, respectively.

== Episode list ==
No.	Title	Original release date
1	"Silver Shadow"; Transliteration: "Giniro no kage" (Japanese: 銀色の影)	April 7, 2008
Akira Nikaido is an easygoing student whose life is about to change after an encounter with a stranger who knows his name. The man, Shirogane, does not possess a shadow and explains that this is because he is a shadow himself. Shirogane then disappears, making Akira think he might have been a ghost. Later that night, Akira's friend Kengo drags him out to 'enjoy' the night at an arcade. There, they save a young child named Haruka and his butler from bullies. Afterwards Aya, the school prefect, finds them. In exchange for not beating them up, she asks for a favor: accompany her to their school so she can pick up something she forgot. They go there and, after getting the dragon plushie she forgot, they start walking back outside – only to be attacked by shadow monsters. Aya accidentally beats Kengo and faints when her plushie's head is severed by a shadow's blades. Akira tries to ward the shadows away with Aya's sword but it gets destroyed. Shirogane appears to lend his aid by creating a barrier. He explains that the shadows are called "kokuchi". Confused, Akira runs through the barrier, only to sink into the ground and loses his shadow. Shirogane saves him and explains that if he remains shadowless, Akira will die but can be saved if he makes a deal with him. Akira agrees and Shirogane kisses him, turning him into a Shin (shadow being) which gives him special powers (Shin form: dark haired version of himself with different clothes and 2 daggers). The next morning, the fight is finally over and Akira asks Shirogane how to be human again. Shirogane explains that he can't and also normal people can't see him. Kengo and Aya arrive and Shirogane vanishes, leaving a confused but normal Akira behind.
2	"A Scar's Shadow"; Transliteration: "Kizuato no kage" (Japanese: 傷痕の影)	April 14, 2008
Akira lies on his bed, wondering if last night was a dream or real. When he turns to his right side he sees Shirogane lying beside him, which makes him fall on the floor. Shirogane confirms that it was not a dream and makes advances on him. Akira demands an explanation but Shirogane tells him little, asksing him to trust him on this. Akira decides he still doesn't trust Shirogane completely but accepts the explanation for now. Akira goes to school (Shirogane acts as his shadow, making him visible for humans again) and a Kokuchi appears. In order to save his classmates, Shirogane releases himself from Akira, transforming Akira in a Shin again. They jump from the fifth floor, Akira saying they might die but Shirogane lands perfectly on the ground. The plan is for Akira to distract the enemy while Shirogane closes the hole from which the Kokuchis came from. Akira is about to get stabbed when Shirogane saves him (after sealing the hole) but gets a deep bite from the Kokuchi before finishing it. Shirogane takes Akira to a bar named 'Bar Still" to meet the Master, a blind bartender (who can sense Shin and Kokuchis presence) who is in possession of very strong psychic abilities. The Master heals both of them and tells Akira about the Doppler item which allows Akira to regain his human form without Shirogane being his shadow, which frees Akira from Shirogane's constant flirting.
3	"The Invading Shadow"; Transliteration: "Shinshoku suru kage" (Japanese: 侵食する影)	April 21, 2008
Akira and Shirogane are in the 'Bar Still' when Kengo's older sister, Mayu comes on and spots Akira. She says that he has become more handsome and wants to play with him, much to Shirogane's distress. Mayu sees Shirogane's back before he leaves and asks Master who he is. Outside, Shirogane tells Akira that Mayu has a strong ESP sense and may have seen him. After getting drunk, Mayu complains to the Master about her love life and tells him he's attractive (she has an attraction to good-looking guys). On her way home, Mayu sees 2 blue orbs but when she looks again they have disappeared. A blue-haired guy appears and tells her that he'll help her... Akira is at Kengo's place who's happy with the visit because he rarely visits him. When Mayu enters the room, she lashes out to Shirogane but he disappears, leaving Kengo and Akira as her targets. Akira notices her strange behaviour but Kengo says that she's often like this after drinking. Trying to escape her Akira and Kengo go out of the room and close the door but Mayu breaks it with ease. Kengo thinks that she might be possessed and goes to get a salt (used in exorcism), asking Akira to keep her busy. He runs downstairs and asks Shirogane what is happening, who explains that she's possessed by a Kokuchi parasite since she has darkness in her heart. Kengo appears with the salt and sprinkles it but had little effect. Mayu grabs Kengo and flings him against the wall while Akira tries to talk some sense in her while she strangles Kengo, who finally lose consciousness. Aira changes to a Shin and tries to make her realize what happened but Shirogane thinks it's useless since the parasite is nearly one with her. Mayu finally unleashed a sea of darkness which almost drowns Akira and Kengo (who woke up). Thinking that Akira might die, Shirogane decided to kill Mayu, to Akira's protest. Shirogane readies himself for an attack and Kengo sees this, calling out to her. Mayu wakes up, making the parasite leave her body and Akira finishes it.
4	"A Blade's Shadow"; Transliteration: "Tsurugi no kage" (Japanese: 剣の影)	April 28, 2008
Akira tells Kengo about the Kokuchi and Shirogane when Aya appears and forces them to watch her kendo lesson. During the lesson they meet Aya's teacher, Hiroki Tsukikage who values honor above anything else. Hiroki gives a lecture and asks Aya to train with him. Even though she's strong, Aya loses to her more experienced senpai (Hiroki). Before going home, he tells her that they'll have an Iai training (using of a real sword instead of wooden one) the next day. Later, Hiroki finds himself surrounded by the corruption of Japan's streets (like the 3 female students, hanging out and laughing/belittle him when he told them to go home or the prostitutes calling out to him), leaving him frustrated when the blue haired guy appears. The next day, news of a Sword-Killer spreads. The killer did not really kill the victims but injured them enough to bad they had to be sent to a hospital (the victims are the people whom Hiroki saw the other night). Aya, waits for Hiroki with Akira and Kengo but he doesn't show up. The 2 go home separately afterwards. Meanwhile, Mayu tries to get home, mumbling about handsome guys when the Killer appears in front of her. He states that she's wearing improper clothes and attacks her. While walking home, Aya she hears Mayu's scream and rushes to her. She sees the killer, who is about to hurt Mayu with a katana (real swords) but deflects it with her own. Akira and Kengo also arrive at the place and decide to intervene. Aya is facing the Sword-Killer, who turns out to be Hiroki to hear shock. As Akira and Kengo defeat the Kokuchi, Aya awakens her powers and defeat them. Afterwards, Shirogane tells Akira that he'll need comrades, as they are necessirily. Akira finally agrees, seeing that Aya is very promising in terms of fighting but when Kengo also insists to become his comrade Akira dismisses and ignores him.
5	"Shadow's Back"; Transliteration: "Senaka no kage" (Japanese: 背中の影)	May 12, 2008
Akira and Aya are in 'Bar Still' when Kengo appears, demanding to know why Aya is accepted as a comrade and he isn't. Annoyed, Akira points out that he can't bring someone who is a nuisance/useless in battles. Angry by the rejection, Kengo walks away and gets into a fight with a few guys, saving Haruka (from ep1) in the process (who was being bullied). After the fight, he leaves Kengo behind because "there are times that someone wants to be left alone". Meanwhile, Akira lies on the grass and Aya tries to persuade him to apologize to Kengo since he's always there for him. Even when they were kids and Akira got in a fight, Kengo would always help him. Kengo reflects on the situation when the blue haired guy appears and sent 3 kokuchis to possess Kengo. Later, the same blue haired man appears before Akira and introduces himself as Nanaya. He leaves a possessed Kengo to fight Akira, while his subordinate, Ruru, appears. She reveals that Shirogane (she calls him Shirogane-sama) is a direct descendant of the Royal Shin. Shirogane explains that it's his duty to keep both worlds (the Light world and the Shadow world) in balance. Ruru says she doesn't intend to fight him and leaves. After beating the 3 Kokuchi out of Kengo, Akira reveals that he doesn't want to drag Kengo into fighting Kokuchi and risk him getting hurt, but gets persuaded by Kengo otherwise. Akira then 'looks' in Shirogane's coat by searching the inside it with his right hand, making Shirogane flustered and commenting that they shouldn't do that in a public place. Akira finds what he was looking for and hands Kengo the Al Cesta glove, finally accepting him as his ally.
6	"A Rose's Shadow"; Transliteration: "Bara no Kage" (Japanese: 薔薇の影)	May 19, 2008
Akira, Kengo, and Aya are invited to Haruka Kujou's house, where they learn the secrets of the Kujou family. The previous head of the Kujou house, Shinnosuke Kujou, had experimented with devilish experiments and rituals. The group is then attacked by two sealed servants of the Kujou house, Kyou and Rin, who had escaped by manipulating Kengo. Akira and Aya fight the two, during which Aya reacts to her Kuresame, giving her samurai armor and a katana for use. Akira, Aya, and Shirogane successfully exorcise the two after hearing their history, in which they were involved with Shinnosuke Kujou's evil rituals. However, Nanaya had saved them from pain by possessing them with Kokuchi. After, Haruka befriends Akira, giving Akira another friend besides Kengo, who is, comically, still tied up in the Kujou house's basement.
7	"Shadow's Beauty"; Transliteration: "Bishin no kage" (Japanese: 美神の影)	May 26, 2008
Bar Still receives a new employee: Shou Mikami. Both Aya and Mayu apparently fall in love with him. A day later, Shou and Mayu go out on a date. At the end of the date, Shou appears where Akira likes to be alone, but can't anymore thanks to Shirogane. Shou then reveals a devastating secret: his name is actually Shouko Mikami, and that he is actually a woman. Finding the courage to tell Mayu within Akira, Shou tries to confess his secret to Mayu the next day, but she misinterprets this [thanks to Aya] as a proposal. Later, Mayu is heartbroken when she finds out the truth. Melancholic, Shou is possessed by a Kokuchi, and attacks Mayu. However, she is saved by Akira and the others. In the end, Shou decides to admire Aya, who she strangely finds very manly.
8	"Shadow of the sandman" Transliteration: "Saō no kage" (Japanese: 沙翁(さおう)の影)	June 2, 2008
While watching a rehearsal for the acting club, two members of the Saou Boys Club ask Akira to play the part of Hamlet in their next play. Reluctant at first, Akira eventually agrees to play Hamlet. However, during the course of rehearsal, many accidents occur that threaten Akira's life. One of the Saou Boys Members, Sawaguchi (a woman who acts as the director) volunteers to play the role of Hamlet. However, Maki (a talented actor who wanted Akira to play Hamlet) will only allow Akira to play Hamlet. Sawaguchi, hurt by this fact, is possessed by a Kokuchi. After she is saved by Akira and the others, Maki and Sawaguchi express their love for each other and make the play a huge success.
9	"Shadow of the Cottage of Forgotten Laughter"; Transliteration: "Shōbōtei no kage" (Japanese: 笑忘亭(しょうぼうてい)の影)	June 9, 2008
On the request of Haruka, Akira and co. head to a strange mansion to help Yuriko whose parents have disappeared and to help her find a jade baby. After, resting in the hot springs, Nanaya shows up and traps them with an army of Kokuchi. Yuriko's parents are discovered to have been swallowed up by the shadows. But, before they were swallowed they entrusted their wishes in a statue that saves Akira and co. The mansion is destroyed, however, Yuriko finally makes peace with her parents after finding the jade baby inside the statue.
10	"Shadow's Illusion"; Transliteration: "Kyozō no kage" (Japanese: 虚像の影)	June 16, 2008
A popular idol named Jun Fujisaki enrolls into Akira's school due to an 'incident'. Apparently, he knows Akira because they were friends back during their first year. He had asked Akira to join him in his career. However, Akira declined saying he preferred his life now. Jun admits to Akira that the incident that had occurred was a fraud. The incident involved Jun beating a man. However, Jun was forced to hit the man due to self-protection. The press and the society views Jun as a snobbish and not-so-good person, which causes him create anger inside of him. This anger interests Nanaya and he merges a Kokuchi and Jun Akira, Kengo, Shirogane, and Aya have to fight against Jun to save him.
11	"Impatient Shadow"; Transliteration: "Shōsō suru kage" (Japanese: 焦燥する影)	June 23, 2008
Shirogane has a weird dream and gets sick. With him becoming sick, the team delays their plans on how to beat Nanaya and lets him rest for a while. However, Nanaya, enraged that his boss has given up hope on him, kidnaps Kengo and Aya in order to lure our Shirogane. With Shirogane in bed, Akira sets out to save his friends, but he is almost killed by Nanaya. Shirogane comes and saves Akira and collapses. Nanaya, seeing his chance to take Shirogane, captures Shirogane and takes him away. Akira stares into darkness, angry that he couldn't save Shirogane.
12	"Annihilating Shadow"; Transliteration: "Shōmetsu suru kage" (Japanese: 消滅する影)	June 30, 2008
Determined to save Shirogane the team heads out to take him back. At the same time, Shirogane is being tortured but isn't showing any signs of weakness. Akira and Co. then arrives and during the fight with Nanaya Akira gains a new weapon and stronger power.
13	"The Light people's shadow" Transliteration: "Hikaribito no kage" (Japanese: 光人の影)	July 7, 2008
Akira and Co. heads out to find Kengo and Akira's friend, Kouni. But he finds them first and peeks under Aya's skirt. A few minutes later Kouni is challenged to a fight by three strong-looking guys. However, Kou is so fast that they barely can see his movements he defeats them easily. Later that day Shirogane sneaks out when Akira has fallen asleep and meets up with Kouni, apparently they know each other. Akira surprises them by coming just a few minutes later and after a fight with simple kokuchi's, the whole team gathers, Kouni says he will serve Akira, his king.
14	"Dangerous Shadow"; Transliteration: "Kiken na Kage" (Japanese: 危険な影)	July 14, 2008
The next "work" for Kouni is to separate a Mafian's son from his girlfriend who is Kengo's sister. The problem starts with a broken-heart so, the kokuchi appear...
15	"Healing Shadow"; Transliteration: "Jinjutsu no Kage" (Japanese: 仁術の影)	July 28, 2008
Aya is told to investigate the 5 mysteries in the High School, so (as she is afraid of ghosts) Akira, Kengo and Shirogane helped her. All those mysteries prove to be false, but after they thought it's all done, Maya falls sick and goes to a doctor. The doctor is deeply unsatisfied with his current position, being in a high school and in a university treating mild sickness. He is possessed by Kokuchi.
16	"Portrait of a Shadow"; Transliteration: "Shōzō no kage" (Japanese: 肖像の影)	August 4, 2008
All pictures have their meanings... One picture made by Momiji reflected Akira in his Shadow form fighting against Kokuchi, when they started to investigate the artist, they found that the artist was actually called Momiji, a great grandchild of a great artist. The artist had drawn the portrait of Haruka's grandfather several decades ago when he was small, which looked identical to Haruka. The artist is now old and unable to draw, his vengeance causing him to be possessed by Kokuchi.
17	"Shadow of W"; Transliteration: "W no kage" (Japanese: W の影)	August 11, 2008
Aya and Kengo each requests Akira's help with the tennis and boxing club. Akira has no interest and ignores their invitation, but is threatened with an embarrassing secret from his past and reluctantly accepts. Akira is made to do club activities from his usual going home routine. However, the tennis and boxing match are on the same day. Both the Boxing and tennis team captains then struggle for Akira. Ruru arrives with Kokuchi and possesses the opposing sides. Akira, feeling like a pawn, fights all of the Kokuchi single-handedly. At the end, Akira completes all of the challenges issued.
18	"Shadow's Date"; Transliteration: "Ōse no kage" (Japanese: 逢瀬 の影)	August 18, 2008
Shirogane and Akira argue. The next day Shirogane is on a date with Ruru at the same time Kengo has one. Akira gets dragged along by Aya and Kou to spy on Kengo's date. Akira spots Shirogane and Ruru on a date. Akira gets mad (jealous in his heart) and goes to see what's going on between Shirogane and Ruru. Shirogane explains (again) where his loyalties lie.
19	"Shadow's Paradise"; Transliteration: "Rakuen no Kage" (Japanese: 楽園の影)	August 25, 2008
Haruka takes the rest to his family's deserted island to talk about the Kokuchi and make a strategy, but in the middle of the night, Kengo is attacked... who is the culprit?
20	"Shadow's Dedication"; Transliteration: "Kenshin no Kage" (Japanese: 献身の影)	September 1, 2008
Akira and co. are enlisted by Haruka and Hikojurou to help a butler who is about to be fired. They attend a butler audition, but the plan proves to be a failure as the young mistress is enjoying herself. On the final task, the butler sees Akira with the mistress's handkerchief and gets jealous. He gets possessed by the Kokuchi, but it gets defeated easily. The butler and the mistress then make up.
21	"Shadow of the White Horse"; Transliteration: "Hakuba no kage" (Japanese: 白馬の影)	September 8, 2008
Kou got back and opened his door, looked at his fish when he someone was in his house. A prince from a small place in Europe comes to visit Kou, with the excuse that he misses Kou. The truth is, he was being assassinated. Kou brought him to Master's bar where he called out the others to meet him. Mayu barged in announcing that she has found another 'ikemen' besides Shirogane. Shirogane kept annoying Akira by asking if he was more beautiful than Prince Andrew, who was then given the nickname 'An-chan' by Kengo. Said prince followed Akira and co. to school to experience how it is like to be in a school (the prince has a tutor who comes to his palace to educate him, thus, he has no idea what a school looks like). He was instantly surrounded by love-stricken girls and started asking him questions but he looked uncomfortable when one of them complimented his beauty. Haruka invited the whole gang to his house and an assassin missed his shot, the bullet went into one of the pillars, and in turn was captured by Kou (he chased after him). He points out that it was An-chan himself who hired the assassin because he wanted to frame his younger brother, who turns out that he actually admires and adores Andrew. Andrew ran away from them and ended up in a forest where he got possessed by the Kokuchi, called forth by Ruru, commenting that she finally saw a human with darkness in his heart. It got defeated quite fast after being awakened by Kou's words (and a few punches from the others of course). When Andrew woke up, he saw his horse standing next to him and the so much rumoured younger brother, George, turned out to be not so flattering. Shirogane pointed out that the prince's country has a different views of handsome people. George and Andrew went back with their own horses, Andrew being the Prince of the White Horse. Andrew asked Kou one last time if he will consider the offer he made, but Kou stood by his decision and the brothers finally left.
22	"The Betraying Shadow"; Transliteration: "Haishin no kage" (Japanese: 背信の影)	September 15, 2008
The openings to the darkness which were sealed by Shirogane opens up causing a weird thundering red-sky phenomenon. Kou is shocked by the numbers of Kokuchi's at his area. Haruka appeared and tells Kou he suspects that there's a spy among them. Akira, Kengo and Aya ran to Kou-nii during the attacks in their school. Kou tells Haruka to repeat what was in his mind and at the end of the sentence, Shirogane appears with his usual flirty smile. They fells betrayed Kou and Shirogane fights because Haruka says that Shirogane's the spy and told out the evidence. Ruru saves Shirogane confessing that their plan is revealed. Shirogane denies it and brought Akira up to an abandoned building. He whispered something in his ears, standing really close and intimate. Kou comes in and dives from a few floors with Shirogane. He sacrificed himself to kill Shirogane.
23	"The Shadow of Truth"; Transliteration: "Shinsō no kage" (Japanese: 真相の影)	September 22, 2008
Akira holds Shirogane's cane while the three of them sat at the back of Mayu's car with Master beside her, heading to Haruka's mansion. Akira is silent along the ride (while Aya and Kengo cannot believe what happened – that Shirogane was a spy and that he and Kou are now dead) and tells Master to stay away from the house with Mayu so that they'll be safe. Master tells them that if someone needed healing, just come to him. Opening the huge door, two possessed (by Kokuchi) maids greeted them and brought them to the living room where they meet a seating Ushi-sama and Ruru at his left side. Ruru calls some Kokuchi and another huge one to kill off Akira and co. Aya and Kengo asked Akira why he is not changing to a Shin but Akira only answered that his current form is enough to defeat the enemies. Akira then baits the huge Kokuchi nearer to Ushi-sama and Ruru while Kengo and Aya kill the smaller ones. Akira aims Shirogane's stick at the Kokuchi's throat and succeeds, it fell on top of Ushi-sama's seat. After the smoke cleared, Ruru carries Ushi-sama (bridal style) and appears safe. Turns out that Haruka is Ushi-sama, not his grandfather as they all thought it would be. Haruka then encourages Akira to transform and so he threw his doppelgänger doll at Haruka, then Shirogane appears (he became Akira's shadow all along). Shirogane commented that it has been awhile that he became Akira's shadow. It was revealed that when Shirogane and Akira were fighting inside the building, he asked Akira for a favor and said that he knows who the spy is and this said spy is trying to frame him up and to trust him for one last time. He said he knew Shirogane did not lie to him, his eyes tell the truth. And so Akira agreed and Kou appeared and bound Shirogane and made it look like he killed him, at the risk of his own life by using a very white, blinding light followed by an explosion. Haruka then asked where onii-chan is and then Kou is seen leaning on the door frame and approached him. Haruka runs away with Ruru, leaving a group of possessed maids with weapons. Kou tells them all to leave this to him and Akira and co. chase after Haruka. Before leaving, Aya said to Kou that she will never forget him and all his harassment moves to her (she said this in a playful tone), to which the maids all looked at him angrily, much to Kou's distress.
24	"The Shadow of the King"; Transliteration: "Ō no kage" (Japanese: 王の影)	September 29, 2008
Shirogane dies <-- No, He is not dead, is only back in the Shadow World;; After finding out that Haruka is actually Ushi-sama, they followed him into Mt. Fuji. Aya and Kengo separate with Akira and Shirogane respectively to deal with any blockages. That doesn't exclude Shirogane himself after an attack from the possessed butler. When Akira found Haruka, he told him everything causing the King of Darkness himself to appear, capturing Haruka. Shirogane came to the rescue but in the end it was Akira who, turned into his Rei form last minute, saved Haruka who cried to be with his nakama. The others who appeared to be safe reached Akira, Shirogane and Haruka with Mayu and Master. Shirogane was then given back his Darkness powers, that he first gave to Akira, the same way like he did and disappeared back into the Shadow world, according to Master. Even though Master was not sure if he'd be safe back there or not. Life went back to normal after that and Akira was more than happy to lead his boring life, again.
