= Poor Prince =

- Also known as: 貧窮貴公子
- Genre: Romance; Comedy
- Created by: Ai Morinaga
- Based on: Yamada Tarō Monogatari by Ai Morinaga
- Starring: Vic Chou; Ken Chu; Annie Yi; Edward Ou; Will Liu
- Opening theme: "I Want to Hold Your Hand" by Dragon 5
- Ending theme: "你是我的幸福嗎" (Are You My Happiness?) by Annie Yi
- Country of origin: Taiwan
- Original language: Mandarin
- No. of episodes: 45

Production
- Producer: Angie Chai (柴智屏)
- Production locations: Taipei, Taiwan
- Running time: 30 minutes

Original release
- Network: Chinese Television System (CTS)
- Release: 11 August – 8 November 2001

Related
- Yamada Taro Monogatari

Poor Prince (Chinese: 貧窮貴公子; pinyin: Ping Qiong Gui Gong Zi) is a Taiwanese television series starring Vic Chou, Ken Chu, Annie Yi, Edward Ou and Will Liu. It is based on Japanese manga series, Yamada Tarō Monogatari (山田太郎ものがたり, Yamada Tarō Monogatari; literally, Yamada Tarō Story) written by Ai Morinaga. It was produced by Comic Ritz International Production and Angie Chai as producer. It was broadcast in Taiwan on free-to-air Chinese Television System (CTS) from 11 August 2001.

== Synopsis ==
Tai Lang (Taro) is the smart, capable, and good at everything. He is popular with girls at school not just due to his qualities but also because of rumors that his family is the richest of the rich families at his school. But the truth is, Tai Lang lives in a poor one-room home with his mother and six siblings, scraping for every single cent and his skills come only from being the man and woman of the house. Unintentionally hiding his poverty, Taro is a kind person which makes him all the more lovable. When Long Zi falls for his exterior, she tries to seduce him to get out of the low-middle-class life she is living until she discovers the truth about his "riches"...

== Cast ==
- Vic Chou as Tai Lang
- Gao Hao Jun as Yu Chen
- Li Jin Hong as San Pu
- Ken Chu as He Fu
- Annie Yi as Ling Zi
- Sandrine Pinna as Si Mei
- Liu Han Ya as Long Zi
- Stella Chang as Niao Ju
- Wu Ti Ni as Mei Jia
- Lin You Wei as Ah Tian
- Edward Ou as Ci Lang
- Kimi Hsia as Mei Sui
- Ivy Yin as Mei-yao
- Jian Pei En
- Ge Wei Ru
- Will Liu
- Yang Ya Zhu
- Eric Chen

== Music ==
- Opening theme song: "I Want to Hold Your Hand" by Dragon 5
- Ending theme song: "你是我的幸福嗎" (Ni Shi Wo De Xing Fu Ma) [Are You My Happiness?] by Annie Yi
