= Maniattemasu =

Japanese manga series

まにあってます!
- Genre: Comedy, Romance
- Manga
- Written by: Ai Morinaga
- Published by: Kadokawa Shoten
- Published: 2004
- Volumes: 2

Maniattemasu (まにあってます!; "Enough!") is a manga series by Ai Morinaga. As with all of Ai's stories Maniattemasu is a twist on a traditional theme.

== Plot ==
Due to her father bankrupting their family, Homare, is essentially sold to the Ichinokura family. Once taken in by them her sense of duty encourages her to work as their maid with hilarious consequences. Her main obstacle is winning over the three sons of the Ichinokura family.

== Characters ==
Homare Hokuno

She's in her first year of high school, and is sold to the Ichinokura family to pay off her family's debt. Her parents disappear soon afterwards using a tuna vessel as their escape craft. She is terribly scatterbrained, always forgetting everyone's names, fighting with Masamune's cat Ran and generally causing havoc and mayhem in whatever she attempts to do, even though she has the most honourable intentions.

Masamune Ichinokura

The eldest son of the Ichinokura family in his third year of high school. Immediately takes a dislike to Homare, and only loves his cat.

Housui Ichinokura

The second eldest son of the Ichinokura family in his second year of high school. Gets extremely frustrated having to repeatedly correct Homare for calling him Houshi (meaning Monk).

Sonichi Ichinokura

The youngest son of the Ichinokura family in his second year of junior high school. Of the three brothers he has the least enmity towards Homare.

== International release ==
Maniattemasu was licensed for international release in a number of languages and regions. It was published in Spain by Planeta DeAgostini, in Poland by Waneko, and in Germany by Carlsen.
