= My Heavenly Hockey Club =

Japanese manga series

- Cover from volume 1 of the manga My Heavenly Hockey Club

極楽 青春ホッケー部 (Gokuraku Seishun Hockey Bu)
- Genre: Romance
- Manga
- Written by: Ai Morinaga
- Published by: Kodansha
- English publisher: NA: Del Rey
- Magazine: Bessatsu Friend
- Original run: 2002 – 2005
- Volumes: 14

My Heavenly Hockey Club (極楽青春ホッケー部, Gokuraku Seishun Hockey Bu) is a manga series written and illustrated by Ai Morinaga. Published by Kodansha in Japan and Del Rey Manga in America. The series ran for 14 volumes, ending in 2005. The first eight volumes were released in North America.

== Plot ==
Hana Suzuki only loves two things in life: eating and sleeping. So, when her handsome classmate Izumi Oda talks her into joining the school hockey club, How will she survive getting up early, working hard, and playing well with others? True, the Grand Hockey Club is full of boys; super cute boys, so it won't be so bad after all.

== Characters ==
Hana Suzuki
Hana Suzuki (the female lead character) is an average 16-year-old high school girl; her hobbies include sleeping and eating. She usually acts tomboyish but can be girly when needed. She is very insecure of her chest. She becomes a goalie on the team due to the unnatural things she can do in her sleep, like blocking everything from going into the net.
Izumi Oda
Izumi Oda is a super-rich 2nd-year high school student and captain of the Grand Hockey Club. His catchphrase is "I am the law" and expects everyone to do what he says. He blackmailed Hana to join the club after his car got hit by Hana by making her think that the car wasn't insured, when it actually was.
Takashi Itoigawa
Takashi is a 2nd year high school student and is Izumi's closest friend. He is the vice-captain of the club. Takashi always goes after Izumi and bears a grudge against Hana for being so close to him. Even if he does hate her, he will do anything to make Izumi happy.
Natsuki Serizawa
Natsuki is in his 2nd year of high school and was appointed as Hana's snack person. Natsuki is rich because his family owns a jewelry company. He is often mistaken for a girl due to his feminine features, but he's actually the manliest member of the hockey club.
Kinta Ayuhara
Kinta Ayuhara is a 1st year high school student and is Ginta's older twin. His first love is Rin-chan from St. Johannes Girls' Academy. But, because Hana gave him the wrong information on what kind of guy Rin-chan likes, his plans didn't work out.
Ginta Ayuhara
Ginta Ayuhara is in his first year in high school and he is Kinta's younger twin. His first love is Ran-chan, the younger twin of his brother's first love. He believes (like his brother) that they look nothing alike and have opposite taste in girls. Because Hana gave him the wrong information about the kind of man Ran-chan likes, his plans didn't work out.

== Reception ==
My Heavenly Hockey Club received generally positive reviews. Kai-Ming Cha, reviewing the first volume for IGN, wrote that "both pacing and storytelling are fluid." Johanna Draper Carlson, writing for Comings Worth Reading, said that events in the series were often "predictable" but "still very funny."

The series also received some criticism. Theron Martin of Anime News Network wrote that the first volume "won't dazzle you with its quality" but "may be enough to amuse."
