= Shiho Sugiura =

Japanese manga artist

Shiho Sugiura 杉浦 志保
- Area: Manga artist
- Notable works: Silver Diamond

Shiho Sugiura (杉浦 志保, Sugiura Shiho) (born January 21) is a manga artist. Shiho Sugiura debuted in 1994 and works under the BL publisher Tosuisha (冬水社). Sugiura's newest manga series, Shuuten Unknown, is serializing in Monthly Comic Avarus.

== Work ==
Sugiura's manga, such as Koori no Mamono no Monogatari (Legend of the Ice Demon), and Silver Diamond (2003–2011) are considered part of the shonen ai genre. Silver Diamond was considered to be a fun story with art that is "distinctively 1990s," according to Anime News Network. The first few volumes were translated into English and published by Tokyopop.

When Shuuten Unknown was released, bookstores in Tokyo and other cities held an exhibition of Sugiura's work. Shuuten Unknown is a fantasy manga about two different organizations searching for treasure.

== Bibliography ==
Title	Year	Notes	Refs
Wana Sugiura Shiho Tanhenshū (罠杉浦志保短編集, Shiho Sugiura trap short stories)	1994	Published in Ichi Favorite Comics; 1 volume	
Shinderera (bōi) Kakuritsuron (シンデレラ(BOY)確率論, Cinderella (Boy) Probability theory)	1994	Published in Ichi Favorite Comics No. 10; 1 volume	
Koori no Mamono no Monogatari (氷の魔物の物語, The Ice-Cold Demon's Tale)	1996–2003	Published in Ichi Favorite Comics No. 18; 24 volumes	
Isagi Kojima (ISAGIーKOJIMA)	1998	Published in Ichi Favorite Comics no. 133; 1 volume	
Koori no Mamono no Monogatari Gaiden (氷の魔物の物語外伝, The Ice-Cold Demon's Tale Side Stories)	2003	Published in Ichi Favorite Comics; 1 volume	
Silver Diamond	2003–2012	Serialized in Ichiraci; Published by Tosuisha in 27 volumes	
Silver Diamond Gaiden (SILVER DIAMOND外伝, Silver Diamond Side Stories)	2012	Serialized in Ichiraci; 1 volume	
Shuuten Unknown (終点unknown, Destination Unknown)	2013–2016	Published by MGC / Avarus; 5 volumes	
Shuuten Unknown Gaiden (終点unknown外伝, Destination Unknown Side Stories)	2016	Published by MGC / Avarus; 1 volume	
