= Number (manga) =

Japanese manga series

- First tankōbon volume cover

番狗―ナンバー―
- Genre: Fantasy
- Manga
- Written by: Kawori Tsubaki
- Published by: Mag Garden
- Magazine: Comic Blade Avarus
- Original run: November 15, 2007 – July 15, 2011
- Volumes: 7

Number (Japanese: 番狗―ナンバー―) is a Japanese manga series written and illustrated by Kawori Tsubaki. It was serialized in Mag Garden's Shōjo manga magazine Comic Blade Avarus from November 2007 to July 2011, with its chapters collected in seven tankōbon volumes as of October 2011.

== Publication ==
Written and illustrated by Kawori Tsubaki, Number was serialized in Mag Garden's Shōjo manga magazine Comic Blade Avarus from November 15, 2007, (Note: It started in the magazine's December issue of 2007 (cover date December 15, 2007), which was released on November 15.) until its conclusion on July 15, 2011. (Note: It ended in the magazine's August issue of 2011 (cover date August 15, 2011), which was released on July 15.) The individual chapters were collected and published in seven tankōbon by Mag Garden, with the first volume released on May 10, 2008, and the final volume released on October 15, 2011.

In France, the manga is licensed by Soleil; and in Italy by GP Manga.

=== Volumes ===
No.	Release date	ISBN
1	May 10, 2008	978-4-86127-504-3
2	November 10, 2008	978-4-86127-555-5
3	May 9, 2009	978-4-86127-629-3
4	November 10, 2009	978-4-86127-677-4
5	June 10, 2010	978-4-86127-740-5
6	January 15, 2011	978-4-86127-814-3
7	October 15, 2011	978-4-86127-911-9

== Reception ==
Planete BD reviewer Faustine Lillaz called the first volume "a mediocre introduction that serves mainly to set the scene" and gave the drawings 2 out of 4 "good" stars and she described the graphics as very dynamic and the decorations detailed and wrote: "The characters are expressive and charismatic, but they tend to pose, which is annoying." Manga Sanctuary called tsubaki's Number completely disappointing with very smooth and basic graphics and layout that does not feel like a shōjo manga and does not know the purpose of the story at the end of the first volume.
