= Your and My Secret =

Japanese manga by Ai Morinaga

- The Extra volume of released on May 14, 2013 by Mag Garden in Japan. It features the characters, from bottom left to top right: Akira Uehara with Shinnosuke Senbongi, and Nanako Momoi with Makoto Shiina.

僕と彼女の××× (Boku to Kanojo no XXX)
- Genre: Romantic comedy
- Manga
- Written by: Ai Morinaga
- Published by: Enix (chapters 1–5); Mag Garden
- English publisher: NA: ADV Manga (2004); Tokyopop (2007–2011); JManga (2012)
- Magazine: Monthly Stencil (chapters 1–5); Monthly Comic Blade (chapters 6–33); Monthly Comic Avarus (chapters 34–62)
- Original run: January 2001 – August 2011
- Volumes: 8
- Manga

Boku to Kanojo no Peke Mittsu Bangai-hen
- Written by: Ai Morinaga
- Published by: Mag Garden
- Magazine: Web Comic Beat's
- Original run: June 25, 2012 – March 25, 2013
- Volumes: 1
- Related media
- Your and My Secret radio drama

Your and My Secret, known in Japan as Boku to Kanojo no Peke Mittsu (Japanese: 僕と彼女の×××; lit. 'My and Her Three X's'), is a Japanese manga series written and illustrated by Ai Morinaga. The series was first published in Enix's Monthly Stencil in January 2001, was later obtained by Mag Garden who published it in Monthly Comic Blade then Monthly Comic Avarus where it concluded its serialization in August 2011. The individual chapters were collected and released into eight tankōbon volumes by Mag Garden. A continuation of the manga, subtitled as Extra-Part (番外編, Bangai-hen), was serialized in Mag Garden's online magazine, Web Comic Beat's, between June 2012 and March 2013; it was later released in a single tankōbon volume. It has been adapted into three radio dramas and a live action film. Your and My Secret follows the effeminate Akira Uehara who switches bodies with the tomboy Nanako Momoi due to an accident.

ADV Manga licensed Boku to Kanojo no Peke Mittsu and released it under the name Your and My Secret in 2004. Tokyopop later obtained the license and released the first seven volumes of Your and My Secret. After Tokyopop's closure in 2011, the North American licensing was returned to Mag Garden. In 2012, JManga licensed and published the eight volumes digitally. The series has also been popularized under the name My Barbaric Girlfriend due to scanlations. Tokyopop's localized volumes appeared on ICv2's monthly top 300-selling graphic novels. English reviewers have praised the series' humor with mixed reaction to the plot and characters.

== Plot ==
Akira Uehara volunteers to deliver homework to Nanako Momoi, his classmate and crush.^{[ch. 1]} At Nanako's home, her grandfather's invention causes Akira and Nanako to exchange bodies; the invention is destroyed shortly after its use.^{[ch. 2]} Nanako is thrilled with the exchange as it complements her tomboy personality; she begins dating her friend Makoto Shiina. Meanwhile, Akira's effeminate personality combined with Nanako's beauty garners the courtship of his friend, Shinnosuke Senbongi, to his discomfort.^{[ch. 5]}

The series continues episodically and focuses on Akira's deteriorating resolve to return to his body and his hesitation in reconciling Shinnosuke's feelings. Eventually, Akira decides to accept the new status quo but a new invention unintentionally reverses the exchange; the invention is destroyed after its use once again and Nanako's grandfather becomes amnesiac. On the behest of Akira and the friends, Shinnosuke begins researching on how to build a machine to reenact the exchange.^{[ch. 62]} Eight years later, Shinnosuke succeeds allowing the four to reunite with their respective lovers.^{[Ex. 6]}

=== Main characters ===
Akira Uehara (上原あきら, Uehara Akira)
Akira is an effeminate male with a crush Nanako Momoi.^{[ch. 1]} After exchanging bodies with her, his personality and Nanako's feminine appearance causes his popularity to soar.^{[ch. 4]} His best friend, Shinnosuke Senbongi, learns his secret and becomes enamored with his new appearance. Initially, Akira was adamant on returning to his body and maintaining his masculinity. During the series, he reluctantly reconciles Shinnosuke's feelings and upon realizing everyone is happier with the new status quo, resigns to live in Nanako's body.^{[ch. 57]} He is voiced by Kenji Nojima in the three radio dramas and is portrayed by Shun Shioya in the live action film.
Nanako Momoi (桃井菜々子, Momoi Nanako)
Nanako is an extreme tomboy with an insensitive personality. Like Akira Uehara, she becomes popular with the students and Akira's parents after the exchange due to her personality and Akira's masculine appearance. Initially Nanako intended to return to her body after having fun as a male and was very strict on how Akira treated her body.^{[ch. 4]} She resolves to stay in Akira's body and relents her body's ownership to Akira after she falls completely in love with her friend, Makoto Shiina.^{[ch. 55]} Her parents learn about the exchange and are supportive of the status quo as they accept Nanako's hopelessness as a female.^{[ch. 51]} She is voiced by Miyuki Sawashiro in the three radio dramas and is portrayed by Mai Takahashi in the live action film.
Shinnosuke Senbongi (千本木進之介, Senbongi Shinnosuke)
Sebongi is Akira Uehara's childhood friend.^{[ch. 6]} He falls for Akira, in Nanako's body, and wholly accepts the body exchange.^{[ch. 19]} Shinnosuke uses his wits in order to make Akira acknowledge his growing attraction towards him. He is voiced by Kōsuke Toriumi in the three radio drama and is portrayed by Taigo Fujisawa in the live action film.
Makoto Shiina (椎名真琴, Shiina Makoto)
Makoto is a good matured girl who is Nanako Momoi's friend. She is unaware of the exchange and begins dating Nanako, in Akira's body, while maintaining her friendship with Akira, in Nanako's body.^{[ch. 5]} Her brother, Katsupei Shiina (椎名勝平, Shiina Katsupei), is overprotective of her and threatens any males who comes close to her. She is voiced by Rie Kugimiya in the three radio dramas and is portrayed by Akie Suzuki in the live action film.
Manzou Momoi (桃井萬造, Momoi Manzō)
Manzou is Nanako Momoi's grandfather. He is overweight, lazy, perverted, and fails as an inventor. After the exchange, he refuses to rebuild the machine as he is happier having a feminine granddaughter who does the house chores.^{[ch. 6]} In the second accident which undoes Akira and Nanako's exchange, he becomes amnesiac from a head injury.^{[ch. 62]} He is voiced by Kenichi Ogata in the three radio dramas and is portrayed by Masahiro Sato in the live action film.

== Release ==
My and Her Three X's is written and illustrated by Ai Morinaga. It began serialization in Enix's Monthly Stencil magazine in its March 2001 issue and published five chapters in total upon the November 2001 issue's release. Afterwards, its serialization was resumed in Mag Garden's Monthly Comic Blade's first issue, April 2002, and published the thirty-third chapter in the October 2007 issue. Its serialization was transferred to Mag Garden's Monthly Comic Avarus beginning in the November 2007 issue where the final chapter was published in the September 2011 issue. Concurrent to the serialization, Ai Morinaga created side stories which were published in Comic Blade Masamune 2003 Summer Edition and Comic Blade Zebel issues 2 to 6. Mag Garden collected the individual chapters and side stories into eight tankōbon volumes which were released between December 10, 2002, and October 15, 2011. Your and My Secret's plot was properly concluded in lit. 'My and Her Three X's Extra-Part' (僕と彼女の×××番外編, Boku to Kanojo no Peke Mittsu Bangai-hen). Extra-Part was published in Mag Garden's online magazine, Web Comic Beat's, between June 25, 2012, and March 25, 2013. The chapters were later released in a tankōbon on May 14, 2013. Morinaga commented the serialization kept her indoors most of the time and limited her contact with people to her assistant, publisher, supermarket cashiers, and delivery boys.^{[vol. 3]}

ADV Manga licensed the series as Your and My Secret for North America and released the first volume on July 6, 2004. Tokyopop later acquired the license and released the first seven volumes between March 11, 2008, and November 30, 2010. After Tokyopop's North American division was closed down, the North American license were returned to Mag Garden. In 2012, JManga licensed the series for digital release in English; the eight volumes were made available between May 3, 2012, and August 23, 2012. The manga has also been localized in other languages such as Germany, Italian, Chinese, Thai, Vietnamese, and Spanish. Scanlations of the Chinese translations popularized the series under the name My Barbaric Girlfriend (Chinese: 我愛野蠻女友; pinyin: Wǒ ài Yěmán Nǚyǒu).

=== Volume list ===
No.	Original release date	Original ISBN	North America release date	North America ISBN
1	December 10, 2002	978-4-901926-24-9	July 6, 2004 (ADV manga); March 11, 2008	978-1-4139-0143-6 (ADV manga); ISBN 1-4278-0522-9 (Tokyopop)
Chapters 1–9
Akira Uehara volunteers to deliver homework to Nanako Momoi, his classmate and crush. At Nanako's home, her grandfather's invention causes Akira and Nanako to exchange bodies; the invention is destroyed by Nanako in a fit of rage. The two resume their daily lives while keeping the exchange a secret. At school, Nanako becomes attracted to her friend, Makoto Shiina and the two start dating. Meanwhile, Akira is courted by his friend, Shinnosuke Senbongi, to his discomfort. The grandfather, Manzou Momoi, refuses to build he machine and persuades Akira to get a job to earn money for his service.
2	June 10, 2004	978-4-86127-046-8	July 15, 2008	978-1-4278-0523-2
Chapters 10–18; Extra chapter
Shinnosuke wins a group trip to Okinawa and invites Akira, Nanako, and Makoto. On Valentine's Day, Akira plans on giving Nanako chocolate but after seeing her affection towards Makoto, decides against it. Makoto's brother, Katsupei Shiina, begins working as a teacher at her school in order to bar males from interacting with Makoto; Nanako thwarts Katsupei's efforts and he becomes attracted to Akira in the progress. Shinnosuke then overhears a conversation between Akira and Nanako and learns about the body exchange. The extra chapter covers Nanako's first day of highschool.
3	September 10, 2005	978-4-86127-193-9	November 11, 2008	978-1-4278-0524-9
Chapters 19–26
Shinnosuke accepts and keeps their story a secret from public knowledge. Akira manages to convince Manzou into rebuilding the machine which Nanako destroys. At school, Akira and Shinnosuke are cast as Romeo and Juliet respectively for a play. It concludes with Nanako interrupting the kiss scene to protect her body's chastity. Shinnosuke makes a final attempt to win Akira's love, but is rebuffed by the latter who affirms his love for Nanako.
4	September 10, 2007	978-4-86127-193-9	February 1, 2009	978-1-4278-1158-5
Chapters 27–33; Extra chapter
Shinnosuke's cold behavior towards Akira forces him to contemplate the fact he may fail to regain his body; in response Akira hesitantly reconciles Shinnosuke's feelings. Shinnosuke takes Akira to a zoo where their date is sabotaged by Manzou. The extra chapter covers Shinnosuke's first meeting with Akira.
5	March 28, 2008	978-4-86127-488-6	December 12, 2009	978-1-4278-1538-5
Chapters 34–41; Extra chapter
Akira's class is on a field trip to Hokkaido. There, Akira sees Nanako buy a ring for Makoto causing him to contemplate whether he should identify as male, hoping he could regain his body, or female and resign himself completely to Nanako's body. The extra chapter focuses on Akira's sister who interacts with Nanako who is in Akira's body.
6	March 10, 2009	978-4-86127-607-1	August 3, 2010	978-1-4278-1865-2
Chapters 42–47; Extra chapters
Akira's internal struggle climaxes when Akira is forced to publicly claim Shinnosuke in order to ward off other girls. In response, Shinnosuke convinces Nanako to forgo her body to Akira. Nanako's parents visit and upon discovering the body exchange, force Manzou to rebuild the machine. The first extra chapter covers Akira's nightmare about Manzou. The second covers Katsupei's attempts to physically threaten Nanako.
7	March 10, 2010	978-4-861277-18-4	December 1, 2010	978-1-4278-0676-5
Chapters 48–54; Extra chapter
Nanako's parents realize that the current status quo is better for both Akira and Nanako and ask Akira to reconsider regaining his body. Later, Akira, Shinnosuke, Nanako, and Makoto have a group date at an amusement park. The extra chapter covers the beginning of Akira's feelings for Nanako.
8	October 15, 2011	978-4-861277-18-4; ISBN 978-4-86127-900-3 (Limited Edition)	—	—
Chapters 55–62
After the date, Shinnosuke gives Akira a ring and asks him wear it when he's ready. Akira realizes he now has to decide whether to regain his body or remain as Nanako. Akira comes to a final decision, confesses his previous feelings to Nanako, and accepts his love for Shinnosuke by putting on the ring. However, Manzou's invention unintentionally returns Akira and Nanako to their original bodies. On the behest of his friends, Shinnosuke begins researching on technology to reenact the exchange.
Extra	May 14, 2013	978-4-8000-0157-3; ISBN 978-4-8000-0118-4 (Limited Edition)	—	—
Chapters 1–7
Akira and Nanako's readjustment to their daily lives is highlighted for most of the volume. Eight years later, Shinnosuke succeeds in building a machine which allows Akira and Nanako to exchange bodies once again and reconcile with their respective lovers.

=== Radio drama ===
Three radio dramas based on the manga series were produced. The first radio drama was available for order in Monthly Comic Blade's August 2005 issue and is a reenactment of the first five chapters in the series. The second drama was included with the limited edition of the eighth volume. It is a reenactment of chapters 29–32. The third drama was released with the limited edition of the extra volume. It reenacts the first three chapters in the extra volume.

== Film adaptation ==
A live action film based on the manga was released direct to DVD on April 21, 2006, by Sega. It is directed by Masaki Hamamoto with screenplay by Mikio Satake. Movie Drama My and Her Three X's Visual Guide Book (Note: ムービードラマ僕と彼女の××× ビジュアルガイドブック, Mūbī Dorama Boku to Kanojo no Peke Mittsu Bijuaru Gaido Bukku) is a guide book which provides background production information on the film. It was released before the film on September 28, 2005. The plot begins similarity to the manga and Akira and Nanako exchange bodies. Manzou gives the two a deadline to raise money in order to rebuild the machine. Akira succeeds but is forced to pay off Nanako's incurring debt. The deadline passes and Manzou leaves Japan, concluding with Akira and Nanako promising to earn enough money for when Manzou returns.

== Reception ==
Tokyopop's localized volumes appeared on ICv2's monthly top 300-selling graphic novels. About.com readers ranked the series third as Best New Shojo Manga in 2008 and was ranked in the 10 Bizarre Shojo Manga Love Stories in 2010. Jason Thompson praised the series for being smart, funny, and unpredictable. Pop Culture Shock.com agreed on the humor, and described the series as something all Shōjo fans will enjoy. Mania.com described the first volume as an enjoyable read, praised it for the humor and its interesting and realistic approach to the gender swap topic, but expressed annoyance with the protagonist's behavior. Meanwhile, IGN panned the plot for being preposterous, citing the protagonists' personalities to be too extreme, and gave no incentive to move past the first volume.

== Notes and references ==
Notes

Primary references

Ai Morinaga. 僕と彼女の××× [My and Her Three X's] (in Japanese). Mag Garden in Japan.
Your and My Secret. Tokyopop in North America. 2008.

- Vol. 1 (ch. 1–9): Volume 1 ISBN 9784901926249 (Mag Garden), ISBN 1427805229 (Tokyopop)
- Vol. 2 (ch. 10–18): Volume 2 ISBN 9784901926249 (Mag Garden), ISBN 9781427805232 (Tokyopop)
- Vol. 3 (ch. 19–26): Volume 3 ISBN 9784861271939 (Mag Garden), ISBN 9781427805249 (Tokyopop)
- Vol. 7 (ch. 48–54): Volume 7 ISBN 9784861277184 (Mag Garden), ISBN 9781427806765 (Tokyopop)
- Vol. 8 (ch. 55–62): Volume 8 ISBN 9784861277184 (Mag Garden)
- Vol. Extra (ch. Ex 1–Ex 7): Volume Extra ISBN 9784800001573 (Mag Garden)
