= Vassalord =

Japanese manga series

- The first volume of Vassalord, published by Tokyopop on July 15, 2008

ヴァッサロード (Vassarōdō)
- Genre: Action, Supernatural, BL
- Manga
- Written by: Nanae Chrono
- Published by: Mag Garden
- English publisher: NA: Tokyopop
- Magazine: Monthly Comic Avarus
- Original run: November 17, 2004 – March 15, 2013
- Volumes: 7
- Original video animation
- Directed by: Kazuto Nakazawa
- Music by: Yukio Nagasaki
- Studio: Production I.G
- Released: March 15, 2013
- Runtime: 28 minutes
- Episodes: 1

Vassalord (Japanese: ヴァッサロード, Hepburn: Vassarōdo) is a josei manga series written and illustrated by Nanae Chrono. It was serialized in Comic Blade ZEBEL from 2004 until 2007, and then later transferred to Monthly Comic Avarus from October 2007 until its conclusion on February 15, 2013. The individual chapters were collected and published in 7 bound volumes by Mag Garden, with the first volume released on May 10, 2006, and the final volume released on March 15, 2013.

It was originally licensed for an English language release in North America by Tokyopop in 2008 but was unable to publish the series to completion. However, Tokyopop announced re-licensing the series in English for an omnibus release in December 2025. The manga was licensed in French by Kami for the first two volumes, before Soleil Productions picked up the title and republished the series. The manga is also licensed in Germany by Tokyopop Germany, in Poland by Studio JG and in Taiwan by Tong Li Publishing. The manga series was adapted into a series of four drama CDs by Frontier Works. An OVA was also adapted from the manga by Production I.G, which was released with the last volume of the manga on March 15, 2013. Reviews have been mixed about the series with reviewers praising or panning the characters' relationship with each other.

== Plot ==
Vampires Charles J. Chrishunds (Charley) and Johnny Rayflo have a strange relationship. Charley is a cyborg vampire mix, and a vampire hunter for the Vatican, while his master Johnny enjoys a playboy lifestyle. While fighting crimes involving vampires, Charley struggles to control his lust for blood and for Johnny, while Johnny (previously known as Addie before becoming a vampire) delights in seducing his servant and attempts to deal with issues from his own past. Johnny cares about Charley (also known as Cherry and Chris), and the feelings don't seem to be one-sided.

== Characters ==
=== Johnny Rayflo a.k.a. Rayflo ===
Voiced by: Fujiwara, Keiji.
Known as the Progenitor of vampires, Johnny Rayflo is a rich vampire playboy with a large mansion and several vampire maids. He was known in the past as "The Confined Elagabalus." Charles J. Chrishunds is his vassal. He acts as a food source for the devout Charley, who refuses to drink human blood. The two of them are constantly fighting, mostly due to Rayflo's perverse nature and tendency to refer to Charley as "Cherry." He is in a relationship with Cherry. Johnny also has a "twin" by the name of Rayfell they are known as 'Adam' and 'Eve'.

=== Charles Chrishunds a.k.a. Cherry ===
Voiced by: Okiayu, Ryotaro
Charles J. Chrishunds, also known as Charley/Cherry, is a vampire/cyborg, and a vampire hunter for the Vatican, his master is Johnny Rayflo a vampire who lives the playboy lifestyle. Solving crimes and fighting his lust for blood, who refuses to drink human blood. Cherry also fights lust for his own master while Johnny delights in nothing more so than seducing Cherry at every turn. Cherry is very possessive and is in a relationship with Rayflo.

=== Rayfell ===
Rayfell is the supposed twin of Johnny Rayflo. Whether they are related or not isn't known. However, they do look and act very similar which is why they can be called twins. She is a Succubus and lives with a young human girl named Cheryl. Rayfell much like her 'twin' Rayflo has a love for cute things and has a habit of teasing Cherry to get him in trouble with Rayflo. It is said that she was created by one of Rayflo's rib bones. She is in a relationship with Cheryl, but she does betray her often. In the end she always regrets doing it.

=== Cheryl Shane Kates ===
Cheryl is a young, human nun who shares very similar features with Chris. She lives with the succubus, Rayfell. She is in a relationship with Rayfell, and is also a Vampire hunter.

=== Barry ===
Barry is an incubus created in the image of the demon who turned Rayflo. He hunts Rayflo in a "game", and can regenerate despite wounds that would be fatal to humans and vampires alike. He seems to have an unnatural attachment to Rayflo and always seeks him out.

== Supporting characters ==
=== Julia ===
She is one of Raflo's maids. She is blond with blue eyes. She is often found at his side helping him with things that are needed as well as assisting Rayflo when Cherry comes to fight him.

=== Minea ===
Rayflo's maid. Beautiful, blonde and with eyes like a cat. She's able to transform into a white cat at will. Minea was once severely abused as a freak show and was saved by Rayflo. That's why she's so loyal to him.

=== 86 ===
A masochist and a junky, 86 acts like a psychopathic man-child and is convinced that an angel is talking and helping him. This "angel" knows all, even the future sometimes. He is also a genius and a one-man army; that's why he's feared by the number one crime boss in Italy—Liu Yaoding—that knows that he's the only one that can take his place. Though he's very good at it, he doesn't seem to like murder, or at least, to hurt innocents. He was working for Liu Yaoding but fled and left the Nulla Family. After which he was arrested by Craig and confined to his home. Rosario Provencano is an alias, as a millionaire, that he uses later in the story.

=== Detective Craig ===
Craig is a detective on the police force and he is very untrusting of Charley and Rayflo. He is also the only policeman the Harold trusts.

=== Harold Wayne ===
A young boy who is a weak and sickly child, due to his legs being disabled since birth. He spends his days in a wheelchair. Harold says he is the only child of Alford Wayne; the owner of Utsurei, a pharmaceutical company that has gathered attention for their successive development of new drugs ... But Harold is secretly Alford himself. Later it is discovered that he was created by the same demon who turned Rayflo by fusing Rayflo's sperm and Rayfell's egg.

== Media ==
=== Manga ===
==== Volume list ====
No.	Original release date	Original ISBN	English release date	English ISBN
1	May 10, 2006	4861272483	July 15, 2008	978-1-4278-0614-7
2	May 30, 2007	4861273714	November 11, 2008	978-1-4278-0928-5
3	March 10, 2009	4861276063	September 1, 2009	978-1-4278-1716-7
4	March 19, 2010	4861277140	Nov 30, 2010	978-1-4278-1867-6
5	March 15, 2011	4861278422	N/A	—
6	March 15, 2012	4861279569	N/A	—
7	March 15, 2013	4800001145	N/A	—

=== Drama CDs ===
Frontier Works released a series of four drama CDs based on Vassalord. The first, Vassalord: Drama CD Act I was released in Japan on August 8, 2006. Act II was released March 21, 2007, Act III on October 24, 2007, and the final CD, Act IV, was released on May 23, 2008. Charley is voiced by Ryotaro Okiayu and Rayflo is voiced by Keiji Fujiwara.

=== OVA ===
An original video animation was adapted by Production I.G from the first "Kakurinomiya no Heliogabalus" chapter of the manga. Directed by Kazuto Nakazawa, with Nariyuki Takahashi and Chieko Miyakawa as character designers and Yukio Nagasaki as sound director, the OVA was released on March 15, 2013, with the seventh volume of the manga. Charley was voiced by Ryotaro Okiayu, whilst Johnny Rayflo was voiced by Keiji Fujiwara. Ryōko Ono was originally cast to play the child version of Charley, but French-Japanese voice actress Christelle Ciari replaced her due to the need to speak her entire part in a foreign language natively.

== Reception ==
About.com's Deb Aoki commended Vassalord for its "fast-paced action", "plot twists", and the characters' complex chemistry with one another. Mania.com's Danielle Van Gorder criticizes the manga for its "over-the-top love-hate relationship between the protagonists" but she also commends the manga for its character designs. A reviewer at Pop Shock Culture criticizes the manga for being clichéd.
