= Nanae Chrono =

Japanese manga artist

- Born: June 18, 1980 (age 46); Utsunomiya, Tochigi, Japan
- Occupation: Manga artist
- Known for: Peacemaker Kurogane; Momo Tama; Vassalord

Nanae Chrono (Japanese: 黒乃 奈々絵, Hepburn: Kurono Nanae; born June 18, 1980) is a Japanese manga artist. He is best known as the creator of the manga series Peacemaker Kurogane, Momo Tama, and Vassalord. He is a trans man.

== Works ==
=== Serials ===
- Wagamama Tenshi no Sodatekata (ワガママ天使の育て方) (1999)

A one-shot manga originally published in Monthly Shōnen Gangan.

- Peacemaker Kurogane (PEACE MAKER鐵, Pīsu Meikā Kurogane) (1999)

Originally as Shinsengumi Imon Peace Maker (新撰組異聞PEACE MAKER, Shinsengumi Imon Pīsu Meikā), it was published in Monthly Shōnen Gangan and ran for six volumes. It was licensed in English by Tokyopop.

- Momo Tama (殲鬼戦記ももたま, Senki Senki Momotama) (2005)

This ten volume series ran in Comic Blade and then in Web Comic Beat's.

- Vassalord (ヴァッサロード, Vassarōdo) (2006)

This seven volume series ran in Comic Blade ZEBEL and Monthly Comic Avarus. The first four volumes were released in English by Tokyopop.

- Paka Run (パカ☆RUN, Paka☆Run) (2008)

A three volume series written by Nanae Chrono but drawn by Nakabayashin Takamasa.

=== Artbooks ===
- Kuro no Ga (黒乃奈々絵画集 「黒ノ蛾」)

Peacemaker Kurogane 92-page full color artbook. First printed in 2004.

- Chrono Graffiti

An art book with 402 pages of full color illustrations. Side A features art from Momo Tama and Side B contains art from various series including Vassalord and Ilegenes. First printed in 2008.
