= Laughing Under the Clouds =

Manga by Karakara-Kemuri

- Cover of the first volume of Donten ni Warau as published by Mag Garden

曇天に笑う (Donten ni Warau)
- Genre: Supernatural
- Manga
- Written by: Karakara-Kemuri
- Published by: Mag Garden
- English publisher: NA: Tokyopop
- Magazine: Monthly Comic Avarus
- Original run: March 15, 2011 – July 27, 2014
- Volumes: 6
- Manga

Laughing Under the Clouds Gaiden
- Written by: Karakara-Kemuri
- Published by: Mag Garden
- Magazine: Monthly Comic Garden
- Original run: December 24, 2013 – February 3, 2017
- Volumes: 3
- Manga

Laughing in Limbo
- Written by: Karakara-Kemuri
- Published by: Mag Garden
- Magazine: Web Comic Beat's
- Original run: December 24, 2013 – present
- Volumes: 11
- Anime television series
- Directed by: Hiroshi Haraguchi; Juria Matsumura (assistant)
- Produced by: Toshio Nakatani; Tomoaki Watanabe; Hiroyuki Inage; Junnosuke Itō; Shunsuke Hosoi
- Written by: Yūya Takahashi
- Music by: Shūichirō Fukuhiro
- Studio: Doga Kobo
- Licensed by: NA: Funimation
- Original network: NTV, BBC, BS Nittele, AT-X, Sun TV
- English network: SEA: Animax Asia
- Original run: October 4, 2014 – December 20, 2014
- Episodes: 12
- Anime film series

Laughing Under the Clouds Gaiden
- Directed by: Tetsuya Wakano
- Written by: Eiji Umehara
- Music by: Yutaka Yamada
- Studio: Wit Studio
- Licensed by: NA: Eleven Arts
- Released: December 2, 2017 – September 1, 2018
- Runtime: 60 minutes each
- Films: 3
- Live-action film
- Directed by: Katsuyuki Motohiro
- Produced by: Fumitsugu Ikeda; Takeshi Moriya
- Written by: Yūya Takahashi
- Music by: Yugo Kanno
- Studio: Shochiku
- Released: March 21, 2018
- Runtime: 94 minutes

Laughing Under the Clouds (Japanese: 曇天に笑う, Hepburn: Donten ni Warau; also referred to as Cloudy Laugh) is a Japanese manga series by Karakara-Kemuri. The manga was serialized by Mag Garden on Monthly Comic Avarus magazine. The series has been adapted into an anime television series by Doga Kobo. The story follows Tenka Kumō, Soramaru Kumō and Chūtarō Kumō, three well-known samurai brothers who send criminals to the secluded prison Gokumonjo in the middle of Lake Biwa. However, the Kumō brothers soon learn how they are tied to the Orochi's vessel, a human host possessed by a demon serpent from ancient times, and how they are destined to destroy it once and for all. The anime has been licensed for North American release by Funimation.

A sequel manga series entitled Laughing Under the Clouds Gaiden (Donten ni Warau Gaiden) premiered in 2014 and ended on 2017. A prequel manga series titled Laughing in Limbo (Rengoku ni Warau) which is set 300 years before the original series premiered in 2014. An anime theatrical film trilogy adaptation of Laughing Under the Clouds Gaiden by Wit Studio was announced, with each part running for 60 minutes and the first part scheduled for release on December 2, 2017. A live-action film adaptation was scheduled for release on March 21, 2018.

== Story ==
In 1868, the Meiji Restoration occurred. Because of this, the country faced many criminals, such as samurai rebelling against their fallen positions. Many were arrested, but they soon broke out of their jail cells and rampaged across Japan. Therefore, the government did their best to prevent this by building a giant prison in the middle of Lake Biwa. However, to get these criminals to the prison, they needed a form of transport. In this way, the Kumō brothers were given the responsibility to take these criminals to their final resting place.

== Characters ==
=== Main characters ===
Tenka Kumō (曇 天火, Kumō Tenka)
Voiced by: Yuichi Nakamura (Japanese); Christopher Wehkamp (English)
Played by: Sota Fukushi

Tenka is the eldest of the three Kumō brothers, as well as the 14th head of the shrine. He is both the father and mother figure to his younger brothers after the death of their parents. When in combat, Tenka is known to be strong enough to defeat dozens of prisoners in an instant with nothing but a fan, as well as being quick on his feet. He refuses to let his siblings take part in any battles, always rescuing them from dangerous situations. He shows symptoms of being the Orochi's vessel, and is promptly prosecuted without a trial, but is later revealed to be alive under the protection of the police. After fighting against the Orochi and Fuma ninjas (including Shirasu and his younger brother), he sustained wounds that left him requiring a wheelchair, unable to walk again.

Soramaru Kumō (曇 空丸, Kumō Soramaru)
Voiced by: Yūki Kaji (Japanese); Dave Trosko (English)
Played by: Yuma Nakayama

Soramaru is the second eldest of the Kumō family. His elder brother, Tenka, entrusted him with the family's twin swords, which he practices with every day. Even throughout combat and practice, the swords remained in their sheath. Soramaru also struggles with the fact that he is weaker than Tenka, not being able to be recognized as a strong man who is worthy of protecting his household. He suffers from memory loss due to the childhood trauma of witnessing his parents' murder and nearly being strangled to death. This experience also causes him to develop an extreme aversion to having his neck touched. After Tenka's alleged death, Chūtarō's disappearance and Shirasu's betrayal, Soramaru's negative feelings causes his mental state to deteriorate and he eventually turns into the real vessel of the Orochi. Later, with Nishiki, Chūtarō and Tenka's help, Orochi is separated from Soramaru, with Abe no Sōsei's katana, and Chūtarō and Takeda's help, kills the Orochi once for all.

Chūtarō Kumō (曇 宙太郎, Kumō Chūtarō)
Voiced by: Tsubasa Yonaga (Japanese); Terri Doty (English)
Played by: Kirato Wakayama

The youngest of the family, Chūtarō is the fastest of the brothers when it comes to speed. He also has a friendly relationship with the shrine's tanuki named Gerokichi. After learning that Tenka was actually not the real Orochi's vessel and has died for nothing, he decides to seek revenge and leaves the Kumō Shrine with Naoto Kagami. Later, he discovers that Tenka is still alive, and reforms his way. He cooperates with Soramaru and Takeda in the finishing blow to kill Orochi.

Shirasu Kinjō (金城 白子, Kinjō Shirasu)
Voiced by: Takahiro Sakurai (Japanese); Robert McCollum (English)
Played by: Renn Kiriyama

Kinjō is a freeloader at the Kumō Shrine. Because of this, he does a lot of the household chores, such as serving tea to guests. He is also one of the last remaining members of the Fuma clan, known as ninjas that were independent of master or money, loyal only to themselves. Kinjō was rescued by Tenka and is now his close friend. It is later revealed that his true that identity is the 10th head of the Fuma clan, Kotarō Fūma, and that his real objective has always been to resurrect the Orochi. He and his younger twin brother faked the Fuma massacre then separated ten years ago in order to lie low and prepare for the return of the Orochi. The younger brother was planted within Gokumonjo to gather support, while the elder brother joined the Kumō family to protect the Orochi's vessel. He was also responsible for the murder of the Kumō brothers' parents. "Shirasu Kinjō" is only an alias given to him by the Kumōs and means nothing to him. Later, when the Orochi is killed, he is confronted by the Kumō siblings, but prefers to commit suicide by jumping off a cliff. In Gaiden, it is revealed that he survived the fall and has rejoined the Fuma clan, but still has feelings of fondness for the brothers.

Botan (牡丹, Botan)
Voiced by: Rina Satō (Japanese); Morgan Garrett (English)

Botan, out of an initially unknown motive, has joined forces with Tenka in search of the Orochi's vessel. She first appears to be Chūtarō's schoolteacher, but is later revealed to be a Shikigami that played an important role in the sealing of the Orochi during its last awakening three hundred years ago. Later, when Orochi resurrects in his full form (separated from Soramaru) she is about to be destroyed when Hirari remembers and saves her.

Abe no Hirari (安部 比良裏, Abe no Hirari)
Voiced by: Kenichi Suzumura (Japanese); Micah Solusod (English)

Hirari is a one-armed police officer who often dreams of an unknown but beautiful woman. The woman is later revealed to be Botan, and the reason behind his inexplicable dreams is because he is the reincarnation of a man whose fate has been tightly intertwined with hers. At midst Orochi's awakening, Hirari remembers all about Botan and confesses his long lost love for her.

Nishiki (錦, Nishiki)
Voiced by: Mamiko Noto (Japanese); Jamie Marchi (English)

Nishiki first appears as a prison guard in Gokumonjo. She is later revealed as one of the last remaining members of the Fuma clan. However, she is not considered a pure and full-fledged Fuma as she has not completed the coming-of-age ceremony. This accounts for her unusual appearance of having only one purple eye and half of her hair being white. She has developed feelings for Soramaru and is very protective over him.

=== Yamainu (Orochi Extermination Squad) ===
Abe no Sōsei (安倍 蒼世, Abe no Sōsei)
Voiced by: Kōsuke Toriumi (Japanese); Eric Vale (English)
Played by: Yuki Furukawa

Captain to the Yamainu Squad, he is skilled at hitting the enemies vital points to knock them out. He used to be very good friends with Tenka before the latter's desertion. He becomes Soramaru's teacher to help him to be stronger, and reconciles with Tenka during the Orochi's revival.

Kiiko Sasaki (佐々木 妃子, Sasaki Kiiko)
Voiced by: Sayaka Ohara (Japanese); Colleen Clinkenbeard (English)

Member of the Yamainu Squad, she is skilled at using two revolvers to fight. She is Tenka and Sōsei's childhood friend since the start of the Yamainu Squad, and she is the moderator between her friends' conflicts.

Seiichirō Takamine (鷹峯 誠一郎, Takamine Seiichirō)
Voiced by: Hiroki Yasumoto (Japanese); Christoper R. Sabat (English)
Played by: Shunsuke Daito

Vice-captain to the Yamainu Squad, he is skilled using a big broadsword in combat. He is the teacher of Takeda (a novice in the Yamainu Squad) in combat.

Mutsuki Ashiya (芦屋 睦月, Ashiya Mutsuki)
Voiced by: Yūki Fujiwara (Japanese); Clifford Chapin (English)

Member of the Yamainu Squad, his speciality is using magic and sorcery, including summoning Shikigamis as familiar to gain information.

Zenzō Inukai (犬飼 善蔵, Inukai Zenzō)
Voiced by: Takahiro Fujiwara (Japanese); Cole Brown (English)
Played by: Masaki Kaji

Member of the Yamainu Squad, his specialty is fighting with his bare hands.

Shi Qian-Lang (屍 千狼, Shī Chenran)
Voiced by: Hiroshi Iwasaki (Japanese); Mike McFarland (English)

The oldest member of the Yamainu Squad, his specialty is fighting with claws.

Rakucho Takeda (武田 楽鳥, Takeda Rakuchō)
Voiced by: Hiro Shimono (Japanese); Joel McDonald (English)
Played by: Tomohiro Ichikawa

The newest member of the Yamainu Squad, he fights using a Katana. He is Takamine's disciple and Soramaru's rival/friend, and he gets easily jealous when Nishiki is near to Soramaru.

=== Other characters ===
Naoto Kagami (嘉神 直人, Kagami Naoto)
Voiced by: Shinichiro Miki (Japanese); Ian Sinclair (English)

A fisherman who is known as "a maniac who kills government officials without hesitation, striking down those who oppose his way." He uses a special sword that comes out of both his sleeves in the form of several blades attached to each other. He later escapes from Gokumonjo and lures Chūtarō away from the Kumō Shrine, promising him vengeance. During the Orochi's revival, he is saved by Chūtarō when a tree was about to stamp him, and, as in return, helps Chūtarō (from the shadows) saving him from a Fuma ninja.

Kotaro Fuma (風魔 小太郎, Fūma Kotarō)
Voiced by: Kōji Yusa (Japanese); J. Michael Tatum (English)

He is Shirasu's younger twin brother with the same name, therefore, his "shadow". The remarkable differences between him and his brother are longer hair worn in a ponytail, wearing a fox mask that hides a grievous scar on the right side of his face. He was a prisoner in Gokumonjo prison, where he gets all personnel and prisoners at his favor by providing them opium. He joins his brother to awaken Orochi, but eventually their plans are frustrated by the Kumō siblings and Yamainu's progress. He sacrifices himself trying to kill Tenka and Sōsei in Orochi's beam, but is the only one to die, with Tenka and Sōsei sustaining grievous burns.

Taiko Kumō (曇 大湖, Kumō Taiko)
Voiced by: Keiji Fujiwara (Japanese); Sonny Strait (English)

He is the father of Tenka, Soramaru and Chūtarō and was the one who founded the Yamainu Squad and worked as its instructor. Taiko was not a Kumō by birth, but a son-in-law adopted into the family by marrying with Koyuki, his wife. Eleven years ago prior to the beginning of the series, he and Koyuki were assassinated by a masked Fuma, later revealed to be Kotaro Fuma (aka Shirasu Kinjō).

Kagemitsu Kumō (曇 景光, Kumō Kagemitsu)
Voiced by: Daisuke Kishio (Japanese); Josh Grelle (English)

He was the head of the Kumō family from 600 years ago prior to the series who, along with Abe no Hirari, helped Botan to seal the Orochi. He used the Kumō Ceremonial Swords as his main weapon, which Soramaru wields in the future. He also has Gerokichi as his tanuki familiar, which Chūtarō befriends in the future.

Hideo Kitamura (北村 秀夫, Kitamura Hideo)
Voiced by: Tomotaka Hachisuka (Japanese); Randy Pearlman (English)

A police officer who works alongside Tsuchiya.

Yasu Tsuchiya (土屋 ヤス, Tsuchiya Yasu)
Voiced by: Isamu Yūsen (Japanese); Jarrod Greene (English)

A police officer who works alongside Kitamura.

== Media ==
=== Manga ===
The manga series was serialized by Mag Garden on their Monthly Comic Avarus magazine. The manga series has been licensed in North America by Tokyopop.

A sequel manga series entitled Laughing Under the Clouds Gaiden (Donten ni Warau Gaiden) premiered in 2014 and ended on 2017. A prequel manga series titled Laughing in Limbo (Rengoku ni Warau) which is set 300 years before the original series premiered in 2014.

=== Anime ===
The series uses three pieces of theme song: two opening themes and one ending theme. "Biran no Kaze" (毘藍ノ風, Purifying Wind) by Ryūji Aoki is used as the opening theme for the first 6 episodes while "Ruten no Hi" (流転ノ陽, Recurrent Sun) also by Ryūji Aoki is used as the second opening theme from episode 8 onwards. The ending theme is "Attitude to Life" by Galneryus.

==== Episode list ====
No.	Official English title Original Japanese title	Original release date	English release date
1	"Three Brothers, Standing Under the Clouds"; Transliteration: "Sankyōdai, donten ni tatsu" (Japanese: 三兄弟、曇天に立つ)	October 4, 2014	November 1, 2014
Tenka Kumō, Soramaru Kumō and Chūtarō Kumō are three brothers who live in a shrine as samurai and take down criminals that the police cannot handle. Soramaru and Chūtarō travel by boat in order to take an old man to a secluded prison called Gokumonjo. Later at the Kumō Shrine, Shirasu Kinjō pays a visit to Tenka, who notices that Chūtarō is acting strange. After Shirasu speculates that Chūtarō might be in love, Tenka and Soramaru head to Chūtarō's school while seemingly undercover. After failing to sabotage recess, Tenka and Soramaru are introduced to Chūtarō's schoolteacher Botan, but Tenka finds something peculiar about her grading. Afterwards, policemen Hideo Kitamura and Yasu Tsuchiya summon Tenka to catch a samurai bandit who stole Kitamura's sword, while Soramaru and Chūtarō are instructed to stay home. However, Soramaru and Chūtarō find the samurai bandit by themselves and try to defeat him in the woods. The samurai bandit is able to get up twice from being attacked, but Tenka arrives and saves Soramaru from being suffocated. Soramaru lets out all his tears while being carried by Tenka up the shrine steps. In Gokumonjo, the old man meets his cellmate, a man wearing a fox mask.
2	"Cutthroat, Sneering at the Clouds"; Transliteration: "Satsujinki, donten ni azakeu" (Japanese: 殺人鬼、曇天に嘲う)	October 11, 2014	November 8, 2014
The Kumō brothers visit Doctor Ōta to treat Soramaru's wounds and Tenka's apparent hangover. Ōta tells Tenka about Shirasu's association with the Fuma clan, known to be "butchers" compared to other ninja clans. While Kitamura and Tsuchiya inform Tenka that a lunatic named Naoto Kagami is making his way to the Kumō Shrine, Kagami has already made trust with Chūtarō at the shrine steps. Soramaru, claiming to be Tenka, arrives at the steps and tells Chūtarō to go get Shirasu from inside the shrine. Tenka deals with a squadron led by Rakucho Takeda, but Tenka easily defeats the squadron, including Takeda. Soramaru struggles with his fight against Kagami, but Shirasu arrives to intercept until he becomes injured from Kagami's attacks. Tenka arrives in the nick of time when Shirasu is unable to defend himself. Kagami explains how he wants to overthrow the shogunate for their betrayal in approving a sword abolishment edict. Tenka beats up Kagami, who is then restrained by Abe no Sōsei, commander of the Yamainu Squad. It is later shown that Tenka and Sōsei each vow to search for the Orochi's vessel, but Tenka plans to protect it, while Sōsei plans to destroy it.
3	"Second Son, Undercover in Prison"; Transliteration: "Jinan, kangoku ni moguru" (Japanese: 次男、監獄に潜る)	October 18, 2014	November 15, 2014
Botan has joined forces with Tenka to find the Orochi's vessel. Tenka notices Soramaru eavesdropping and keeps him in the dark about it. Shirasu later interrupts Soramaru while he is training to become stronger. Outside a formal ball, Tenka meets with Kiiko Sasaki, a Yamainu Squad member, not long before encountering Tomomi Iwakura, the Minister of the Right. Elsewhere, Soramaru humbly requests Sōsei to teach him the way of the sword, but Sōsei rejects him. Shi Qian-Lang and Takeda agree to help Soramaru if he assists them by finding answers about the Orochi's vessel from inside Gokumonjo. After Chūtarō sends a disguised Soramaru to Gokumonjo, Tenka becomes worried that Soramaru has gone missing. As Shirasu finds Botan in the woods, he questions her motives for teaming up with Tenka to find the Orochi's vessel, and she questions his loyalty to the Kumō brothers in response. In Gokumonjo, Soramaru tries his best not to blow his cover with some familiar prisoners. At the shrine, after finding out what Chūtarō did, Tenka allows Shirasu to go rescue Soramaru. Meanwhile, Soramaru is dragged inside a cell to face the man wearing a fox mask, bringing up traumatic memories of the past.
4	"Fuma, Sneaking through the Prison Gate"; Transliteration: "Fuma, kangoku ni shinobu" (Japanese: 風魔、監獄に忍ぶ)	October 25, 2014	November 22, 2014
Believing that the man wearing a fox mask killed his parents, Soramaru attacks him but passes out afterwards. In the past, Soramaru was suffocated by the man wearing a fox mask at the shrine before Tenka intervened to save Soramaru, leaving Tenka with a large spinal wound. In the present, Soramaru regains consciousness in a separate cell, telling a pink-haired prison guard about the man wearing a fox mask. However, Shirasu and Takeda suddenly infiltrate Gokumonjo. After Takeda handles the escaping prisoners and Shirasu helps Soramaru change into regular clothing, Soramaru confronts the man wearing a fox mask to remember his name. Soramaru returns a first-aid kit to the pink-haired prison guard before going back to the shrine with Shirasu and Takeda. Tenka expresses disappointment in Soramaru for not relying on him, seeing as Soramaru almost died in prison. Shirasu warns Botan to stay out of Tenka's way if she knows anything about the Orochi's vessel. He also explains that the Fuma clan was slaughtered by a child in the past, and he wandered aimlessly until he was found by Tenka. As the rooster crows, Tenka and Chūtarō welcome Soramaru back before they all take a morning rest.
5	"Tenka, Shaken by Turmoil"; Transliteration: "Tenka, fuon ni yureru" (Japanese: 天下、不穏に揺れる)	November 1, 2014	November 29, 2014
After approaching Shirasu and removing her pink wig, the prison guard reveals her true identity as Nishiki, one of the remaining members of the Fuma clan. Shirasu declines Nishiki's offers to lead him to the one who slaughtered the Fuma clan. Soramaru informs Sōsei that the man wearing a fox mask collects poppies, the source of the drug opium. The next day, as Sōsei agrees to help train Soramaru, Kiiko talks about how Tenka once boasted the rank of commander of the Yamainu Squad during childhood. Sōsei tells Soramaru that the mission of the Yamainu Squad is to find and neutralize the Orochi's vessel, a serpent that possesses a human host in order to become its incarnation. At night during a downpour, Soramaru and Chūtarō pick up veggies in town, while Shirasu, Botan and Ōta learn an overwhelming secret about Tenka. Before returning to the shrine, Soramaru crosses paths with Nishiki after realizing she was the pink-haired prison guard. It turns out that Tenka is the Orochi's vessel and is arrested by the police as a result, much to the shock of Soramaru and Chūtarō. News of this also reaches the Yamainu Squad at their headquarters.
6	"The Sun, Disappearing into the Clouds"; Transliteration: "Taiyō, donten ni chiru" (Japanese: 太陽、曇天に散る)	November 8, 2014	December 6, 2014
After it is learned that Tenka will be publicly executed at the Orochi Shrine, Soramaru expresses his feelings about being kept in the dark to Chūtarō, Shirasu, Botan and Ōta. Botan explains that Kagemitsu Kumō, the head of the Kumō family, helped Abe no Hirari and Botan seal the Orochi 600 years ago where Gokumonjo currently stands. Now the Orochi has chosen Tenka as its new human host, despite Tenka having shown paternal and maternal instincts towards Soramaru and Chūtarō. As Tenka approaches the noose, Kitamura and Tsuchiya try to prevent the execution from taking place, but Tenka knocks them unconscious for good reason. Sōsei shows up and questions Tenka as to why he left the Yamainu Squad long ago, but Tenka says that dreams go sour. When Soramaru and Chūtarō force their way pass the policemen in the courtyard to the shrine, Tenka embraces them one last time before a crowd of people arrive in protest against the execution. As Soramaru and Chūtarō weep in anguish while Shirasu and Botan grieve in silence, Tenka is publicly executed at sunset.
7	"Fleeting Laughter"; Transliteration: "Utakata ni warau" (Japanese: 泡沫に笑う)	November 15, 2014	December 13, 2014
600 years ago during the Kamakura period, Hirari saved Botan from several ninjas chasing her. Kiyotsuna Sasaki, who was the guardian of the Omi Shrine, thanked Hirari for his good deed. However, Kagemitsu forbade Hirari from touching Botan. Sasaki and Kagemitsu both believed Hirari to be pure, seeing that his mission was to eliminate the Orochi. Later on, several ninjas surrounded the shrine. Hirari learned that Mangetsu Ashiya, an onmyo mage, created the ninjas with magic. Botan used her own onmyo magic to destroy the ninjas, revealing herself as a familiar specifically conjured to seal the Orochi. Although Botan temporarily tied Hirari to a tree so he would not get in the middle of the fight, Mangetsu suddenly retreated without a trace. Hirari embraced Botan and confessed his feelings, though Kagemitsu suspected Hirari to be the Orochi's vessel. Hirari soon realized that Sasaki was the Orochi's vessel, transforming the human host into a serpent. Hirari, Botan and Kagemitsu worked together to defeat the Orochi, but Hirari sacrificed his left arm while protecting Botan. Once Hirari stabbed the Orochi, Botan completed her spell chant and sealed the Orochi. With her duty fulfilled, Botan gradually vanished like flower petals into the sky.
8	"Boys, Lamenting in the Rain"; Transliteration: "Shōnen, uten ni dōkoku su" (Japanese: 少年、雨天に慟哭す)	November 22, 2014	December 20, 2014
It has been a week since Tenka's execution and it rains throughout the day, much to Soramaru's frustration. An outraged Iwakura, wishing that the Orochi's vessel was captured instead of executed, tells Sōsei to have the Yamainu Squad keep an eye on Soramaru and Chūtarō for the time being. During a training session, Sōsei tells Soramaru to look outward and stand proud in order to become stronger. However, Soramaru returns home, telling Chūtarō in front of Shirasu that Tenka bore the murder of their parents. Soramaru later finds Nishiki badly wounded in the woods and takes her into the shrine to recover. When she wakes up, Shirasu wants nothing to do with her request of restoring the Fuma clan. Kitamura and Tsuchiya arrive, informing Soramaru that a transport has gone loose in the woods. Nishiki offers her services, explaining that her appearance is due to not completing her coming-of-age ceremony. While Soramaru says that everyone is alike, he encounters and defeats the transport. Soramaru carries Nishiki back to the shrine, promising her room and board in exchange. The following sunny day, Soramaru has another training session with Sōsei, which encourages Soramaru to be the head of the Kumō family someday.
9	"Successor, Standing Under the Cloudy Sky"; Transliteration: "Kōkei-sha, nigori sora ni tatsu" (Japanese: 後継者、濁り空に立つ)	November 29, 2014	January 3, 2015
In the woods, Chūtarō encounters Kagami, who escaped from Gokumonjo. Chūtarō is shaken after Kagami explains that Tenka was a sacrifice. At the Yamainu Squad headquarters, Kiiko and Seiichirō Takamine learn from Sōsei that Tenka was not the Orochi's vessel. Kitamura and Tsuchiya report to Soramaru and Shirasu about Chūtarō and Kagami being spotted together in the woods. Sōsei requests Mutsuki Ashiya to conjure familiars to break into Gokumonjo. At a manor in the woods, Takamine overhears from Hirari that Tenka was a proxy for the Orochi's vessel. However, Takamine is soon attacked by an unknown Orochi's vessel. The next day, Soramaru is caught off guard when awakening to nearly strangling Nishiki. Later, Sōsei tells Soramaru that Tenka chose to end his life quickly, then Takeda tells Sōsei that Takamine was taken to the hospital after being attacked in the woods. Botan brings Ashiya to the Kumō Shrine in search of the Kumō family twin swords, the artifacts that were swallowed when the Orochi was sealed. Soramaru later realizes that he is the real Orochi's vessel, remembering that he attacked Takamine. While Shirasu takes Botan to retrieve Chūtarō, Botan believes that using the twin swords would spare the Orochi's vessel.
10	"White Darkness, Turning Back"; Transliteration: "Shiroki yami, ura ni soru" (Japanese: 白き闇、裏に反る)	December 6, 2014	January 10, 2015
Shirasu wounds Botan in betrayal and proclaims that he wants the Orochi to be reborn, explaining that the Fuma clansmen have been retainers for the Orochi for generations. Hirari shows up during their fight, carrying Botan away to safety. Soramaru reveals to Sōsei that he is the Orochi's vessel, begging to kill him as soon as possible. However, Sōsei encourages Soramaru to shed tears for Tenka's death in order to become stronger. Kitamura and Tsuchiya inform Botan and Hirari of a prison break in Gokumonjo, while Sōsei, Kiiko and Zenzō Inukai arrive at Gokumonjo to deal with several Fuma clansmen. The man wearing a fox mask, recognized as Kotaro Fuma, breaks into the Yamainu Squad headquarters. Shirasu and Kotaro bow down to a panicked Soramaru. After the Fuma clansmen retreat, Sōsei inform Kiiko, Takeda and Inukai that the Fuma clansmen want to see the Orochi reborn. Having stolen the twin swords, Shirasu reveals to Kotaro for being responsible for killing the parents of the Kumō brothers, yet later earning their trust. Chūtarō and Kagami discretely witness three bandits attempting to rob Kanbayashi and her two vegetable-foraging friends, but a hooded fighter defeats the bandits. Hirari then recognizes him as Tenka.
11	"The Sun, Shining Again in the Clouds"; Transliteration: "Taiyō, donten ni sai honō" (Japanese: 太陽、曇天に再炎)	December 13, 2014	January 17, 2015
Tenka is shackled and brought in to see Botan, Hirari and Ōta. It is revealed that Tenka was a test subject for a miracle drug developed from Orochi cells. After learning from Botan that Soramaru is the real Orochi's vessel and has been captured by Shirasu, Tenka breaks free from the shackles to search for his brothers. Meanwhile, Sōsei informs Kiiko that Iwakura underwent a major surgery with an Orochi serum which can double healing capabilities. In the woods, the Yamainu Squad confront and defeat the head warden Orita and the surrounding armed prisoners. After Botan arrives and tells the Yamainu Squad that the Orochi's vessel must be exposed to the sunlight, they deduce that using the Lake Biwa underground canal will help them succeed. Nishiki finds Soramaru, realizing that he is no longer the same, but she runs off with the twin swords. After Kagami attacks Kitamura and Tsuchiya, a tearful Chūtarō ends up escaping and finds Nishiki holding the twin swords. Chūtarō heads to the canal as Soramaru follows, while Botan and Nishiki handle Shirasu. The Yamainu Squad are up against Kotaro and the Fuma clansmen. As Soramaru and Chūtarō fight, Tenka breaks through the canal.
12	"Brothers, Gathering Under the Sun"; Transliteration: "Kyōdai, taiyō ni tsudou" (Japanese: 兄弟、太陽に集う)	December 20, 2014	January 24, 2015
Sōsei, Hirari and Takeda depart towards the canal, while the rest of the Yamainu Squad deal with Kotaro and the Fuma clansmen. After Tenka and Chūtarō chase Soramaru away from the canal, Chūtarō uses the twin swords to extract the Orochi from Soramaru, turning the skies pitch black. Soramaru is soon equipped with Sōsei's katana to destroy the Orochi. Sōsei confronts Tenka for hiding the fact that he was a guinea pig for the Orochi serum. Chūtarō saves Kagami from a tree struck by lightning, giving him a second chance to live. As the Orochi wreaks havoc, Botan protects Nishiki, then Hirari protects Botan. Tenka and Sōsei attempt to attack Shirasu, but Kotaro grabs Tenka and Sōsei and sacrifices himself in one of the beams from the Orochi, but Tenka and Sōsei only sustain grievous burns. Soramaru, Chūtarō and Takeda use their swords to destroy the Orochi once and for all. As the sun begins to shine, Shirasu falls off a cliff in front of the Kumō brothers after reliving his moments of being with them as a family. The Kumō brothers later host an outdoor party for the townspeople, including the Yamainu Squad.
