= Flat (manga) =

Japanese manga series

- First tankōbon volume cover
- Genre: Drama; Slice of life
- Manga
- Written by: Natsu Aogiri
- Published by: Mag Garden
- English publisher: NA: Tokyopop
- Magazine: Comic Blade Avarus
- Original run: December 2007 – January 2014
- Volumes: 8

Flat is a Japanese manga series written and illustrated by Natsu Aogiri. It was serialized in Mag Garden's shōjo magazine Comic Blade Avarus from December 2007 until its conclusion in January 2014, with its chapters collected in eight tankōbon volumes as of February 2014.

== Publication ==
The one-shot stories flat and its sequel flat;andante, written and drawn by Natsu Aogiri, were initially published in the Mag Garden's shōjo magazine Comic Blade Avarus in the December 2007 and February 2008 issues; serialization was started in the April issue published in March 2008. The series finished in the January 2014 issue of Comic Blade Avarus, published on December 14, 2013. The individual chapters were collected and published in eight tankōbon by Mag Garden, with the first volume released on September 10, 2008, and the final volume released on February 15, 2014.

In North America, the series was published in English language by Tokyopop, in Italy by GP Manga and J-Pop, and in Taiwan by Tong Li Publishing.

=== Volume list ===
No.	Release date	ISBN
1	September 10, 2008	978-4-86127-533-3
2	May 9, 2009	978-4-86127-628-6
3	January 9, 2010	978-4-86127-690-3
4	September 15, 2010	978-4-86127-775-7
5	August 12, 2011	978-4-86127-882-2
6	July 14, 2012	978-4-80000-027-9
7	May 15, 2013	978-4-80000-162-7
8	February 15, 2014	978-4-80000-265-5

== Reception ==
The manga remained in the top weekly Japanese ranking chart whenever a manga volume debuted. The fourth volume ranked eleventh among the top-selling manga in Japan during September 13–19, 2010, selling a total of 161,948 copies after ranking third the previous week with 108,853 copies.

The seventh volume ranked twenty-sixth among the top-selling manga in Japan during May 20–26, 2013, selling a total of 135,395 copies after ranking fifth the previous week with 88,498 copies. The eighth volume ranked seventh among the top-selling manga in Japan during February 17–23, 2014, selling a total of 109,955 copies after ranking twenty-first the previous week with 20,288 copies. By June 2013, the manga had over 2 million copies in circulation.
