= Silver Diamond =

Japanese manga series

シルバー ダイヤモンド (Shirubā Daiyamondo)
- Genre: Adventure, supernatural
- Manga
- Written by: Shiho Sugiura
- Published by: Tosuisha
- English publisher: NA: Tokyopop
- Magazine: Ichiraci
- Original run: December 20, 2003 – May 20, 2012
- Volumes: 27

Silver Diamond (シルバー ダイヤモンド, Shirubā Daiyamondo) is a Japanese manga series written and illustrated by Shiho Sugiura. It is published in the monthly magazine Ichiraci. It has been licensed for an English-language release in North America by Tokyopop, which only released nine volumes.

== Overview ==
The story starts with a man (Chigusa Senrou) who tries to assassinate the prince of the Amato Empire and fails. He is pushed into a distortion in space and falls into the real world. Rakan, a high school student who lives by himself, returns home from school one day to find Chigusa lying unconscious in his garden, carrying a gun made of wood. Chigusa awakens, and attempts to kill Rakan, thinking him to be the prince, only to be stopped when Rakan unconsciously turns the gun into a tree. Chigusa recognizes him as a "Sanome" and decides to protect him to later bring to the Amato Empire to defeat the prince. After this first encounter, Narushige and then Touji are also brought to the real world through the portal between the Real World and the Alternate World, Amato Empire and become loyal friends to Rakan and Chigusa. When Rakan learns of the state of the Amato Empire and meeting its so-called 'prince', he forces Chigusa into allowing him to come and help stop their world from being destroyed. Rakan vowed to return the alternate world into a green one again and stop the 'prince'.

== Characters ==
Rakan Sawa
A kind-hearted high school boy with a garden that looks like a jungle, and when the flowers bloom a little too much, he gives them to his classmates and teachers for free. He lives by himself, and supports himself using his inheritance from his late adoptive grandfather. His mother and grandfather have both died. He is fond of normal household chores (cooking, cleaning, etc.) He has the power of the Sanome to grow plants and he looks like the prince of the alternate world (apparently is the prince's 'little brother'). He and his mother were found in the gardens by his adoptive grandfather, who gave him the name Rakan. His world is turned upside-down when he finds Chigusa in his garden, in the exact place he and his mother were found. He learns that he is born from a sanome and an ordinary man, who may still be alive in Chigusa's world. His attitude and hair color helps distinguish him from the ayame prince. His attitude also wins over people who may have once tried to kill him. A bishōnen in this world and the other world. Naive and trusts people easily. Has a righteous attitude and always tries to see the best in others. Likes to do things at his own pace. Also is always being put into suggestive positions by Chigusa, who is usually stopped by Narushige. Died together with Chigusa but was revived due to the Sanome resembling his mother. In the last chapter, he was made to repeat a year, as he disappears for almost a year and was seen living with Chigusa in Japan.
Chigusa Senroh
Man of the alternate world with an immortal body. He suffers from amnesia, only remembering his name, his world, and his goal to wipe out all the Ayame. He needs the power of the Sanome for his battle. His family name, Senroh, means he is considered to be from a family of criminals. He, like his ancestor before him, is charged to continue hunting ayame until he goes insane. (the manga explains that his ancestor is chained in a mountain after becoming mad). He has the ability to see the 'unseen'. He can locate any objects, whether hidden or at a distance, sense if others are hostile or harmless, communicate telepathically, and enter into dreams. He often states, "I have good eyes." His main weapon is a wooden (plant) gun, which he uses with great skill. His blood has the ability to turn into bandages and he finds it difficult to feel physical pain. Chigusa is part plant and states that as long as Rakan (a sanome, who can regenerate and grow plants) is near him, he can't die. Once thought as a merciless killer, he begins to change his disposition after meeting Rakan. At first, he attaches himself to Rakan when he learns that he is a Sanome, but he eventually develops a sense of affection to Rakan, vowing to protect him at all costs. He often displays his liking for Rakan by hugging him or picking him up (physically, or with really odd pickup lines.) He has a very blunt way of speaking, and seems to be a bit of a masochist despite his inability to feel most pain. Later it was revealed that the Senroh family consist of only one member that is Chigusa. He's been living for almost 1000 years due to experiment conducted by Hoshiminokoto. Died together with Rakan near the end of manga but was revived. In the last chapter, he is seen living together with Rakan in Japan and has taken the name 'Sawa Chigusa' there.
Narushige Shigeka
The only man of the Shigeka family, which holds a tradition of bearing only women that can bring forth a Sanome (Later, that is found not to be true; the Shigeka family only raises the sanomes and don't actually give birth to them). As a result, he is considered an ill-omen. He is abandoned by his mother, Shigeyuki, as a sacrifice to the orochi, Mitama, but was instead treated with kindness by the giant snake. As a result, he holds a great dislike for Shigeyuki. His sister, Sae, is also later abandoned by Shigeyuki and meets up with Mitama, while trying to find where her brother once lived. He has a companion, Kou, a poisonous snake that can talk and turn into a sword, whom he met when during his youth with Mitama. Kou is very protective of Narushige and often stands up for him when someone speaks ill of his position. As one of the Shigeka family, Narushige possesses such beauty that he is sometimes mistaken for a woman at first. The second person Rakan meets from the Amato Empire. When he is swept into Rakan's world, he was rumored to have been taken by the gods in his own world. Very protective of Rakan, especially against Chigusa and can understand the foundation of how something works after observing it once. His main weapon is Kou and is an extremely talented swordsman. Later it was revealed that Narushige is the half brother of Kinrei and his father is Kingen Kinjou.
Touji Touno
Was given a number in his name because he was born blind, and thus "useless". The Prince healed his eyes, and sent him to the real world to kill Rakan, Chigusa, and anyone associated with them. This was simply an excuse to dispose of him. the third person who Rakan meets from the Amato Empire. He is taken prisoner and after learning the truth about the prince, becomes a loyal and close friend to Rakan. When the gang arrives back in the Amato Empire, they find a group of bandits/frontier guards (number children abandoned by the prince) and discover that the leader, Kazuhi, is actually Touno's older brother. Touji means 'second light' and Touno means 'field of light'. He is usually paired with Chigusa to protect Rakan from his suggestive tendencies and isn't afraid to admit his thoughts about Chigusa. His main weapon is a bow and arrow, both grown from seeds, and is quite a good shot. He also possesses good eyesight (not by Chigusa's standards) and can see in long distances. He tends to misunderstand anything he does not understand (mostly because of Chigusa). After realizing that his eyes, gifted by The Prince, was allowing The Prince to spy on their group, Touji blinded himself. His vision is restored by Chigusa connecting Kazuhi's third eye to Touji.
The Prince
The most powerful man in the alternate world. Believes to be able to tell the future, and can find hidden resources (water and plants). He is an Ayame, although most of his subjects do not know this. Arms are black and clawed; hair is blond. Speaks telepathically. He also states to Rakan, in answer to why he is destroying the world, that he likes destroying. Later it was revealed that he was manipulated by Hoshiminokoto. Near the end of manga, he died together with Kinrei but was revived. He immediately was attached to Rakan after Rakan hugged him. He was also made to keep watch over the shining sand as an atonement.
Kinrei Kingen
The only one close to the prince. He is the only one who can hear the Prince's voice (the Prince communicates by speaking directly into someone's mind). As such, he is immediately assigned as the Prince's personal helper and assistant. When the Prince has something to say, Kinrei speaks for him. Though he appears to be working for the prince, Kinrei has his own agendas and is really using the prince to create his perfect, immortal world. After the prince cuts his neck, he started to care more for the prince. Died together with the prince but was revived and lives with the prince underground as atonement.
Touno Kazuhi
The leader of Sanome Prince Guard. He used to be the type who does not care about anything, but changed when Rakan sprouted flowers from his talisman. He was abandoned by his mother. His mother gave him a talisman which is in fact a seed for light flower. He is Touji's older brother. He has a third eye on his forehead, which gives him the ability to see long distances and in the dark. Likes to tease people together with Miya. Despite his tough attitude, he cares a lot for his brother and the other guards. When Chigusa gains the ability to see and manipulate the circuits of people, Kazuhi's third eye is connected to Touji to let him see again.
Miya
A member of Sanome Prince Guard and Kazuhi and Goushi's best friend. A member of the Yorubashi clan but was thrown out as he was a number child. Likes to tease people with Kazuhi. A twin to Yorubashi Yoruaki. Miya's fondness for reading makes him adept in creating names for the stone creatures the Prince Guard travels with. He is also responsible with renaming his and Kazuhi's name to not include a number in it.
Goushi
A member of Sanome Prince Guard and Kazuhi and Miya's friend. Mentally the oldest out of the guard. In the last chapter, he appears to be in a relationship with Sae, Narushige's sister.
Shigeyuki Shigeka
The head of the Shigeka clan, a clan that cares for the Sanome. A mother to Narushige and Sae. She is cold even to her children as she was able to throw out her children and called them useless. Later it was revealed that she wish for obliteration of the Shigeka clan and that she throws out her children to protect them. In the last chapter, she is living as guest in one of the Kingen's house and has reconcile with Narushige and Sae.
Hoshiminokoto
The 'God' of the Amato Empire. He is the one who created Chigusa, Rakan, the Prince and Kinrei. Hoshiminokoto used the shining sand to communicate with people. He created the current world as an experiment and planned to destroy it to build anew. He created the prince to announce "prophecies" about upcoming disasters. Chigusa was created as a trigger for the giant snakes to turn into streams and awaken other objects that would destroy the world.
