= Monthly Comic Avarus =

Japanese manga magazine

- Cover image of the December 2008 issue of Comic Blade Avarus
- Categories: Josei manga
- Frequency: Monthly
- First issue: September 15, 2007
- Final issue: August 15, 2014 (print)
- Company: Mag Garden
- Country: Japan
- Based in: Tokyo
- Language: Japanese
- Website: Monthly Comic Blade Avarus

Monthly Comic Avarus (月刊コミックアヴァルス, Gekkan Komikku Avarusu) is a Japanese josei manga (for young women) magazine published by Mag Garden.

== History and profile ==
The first issue was released on September 15, 2007, which replaced Comic Blade Masamune a few months after ending publication. The magazine was formerly titled Monthly Comic Blade Avarus before it was renamed in September 2010. While new, female-oriented josei manga works are to be featured in the new magazine, some of the manga published in the shōnen manga magazine Comic Blade Masamune would also continue serialization in Avarus.

Starting with the September 2014 issue published on August 15, it ceased print publication and became a digital-only online magazine.

== Serialized manga ==
- 12 Nin no Yasashii Koroshiya: Leo Murder Case (Founder Masaki; adapted by Ryo Takahashi)
- Akatsuki no Yami (Yumiko Kawai, art by Ayumi Kano)
- Amagoushi no Yakata (Nippon Ichi Software; adapted by Touka Okuno)
- Angetsu Yakou (Munku Mutsuki)
- Ayumu-kun no OO na Hibi (Yufuko Suzuki)
- Boukyaku no Cradle (Moyamu Fujino) (from Comic Blade Brownie)
- Utsurowazarumono -Breath of Fire IV- (Hitoshi Ichimura)
- Coda (Hitoshi Ichimura)
- Countdown 7 Days (Kemuri Karakara)
- Carat! (Yoshitomo Watanabe) (from Comic Blade Zebel)
- Crookclock (Chisato Nesumi)
- Dainashi (Shou Satogane)
- Docca (Yoshitomo Watanabe) (from Comic Blade Brownie)
- Dolci (Soumei Hoshino)
- Donten ni Warau (Kemuri Karakara)
- Erementar Gerad -Aozora no Senki- (Mayumi Azuma) (from Comic Blade Masamune)
- Fetish Berry (Arata Aki)
- Finlandia: Santa Yousei Gakkou (Mei Noguchi)
- Flat (Natsu Aogiri)
- Hanakisou (HaccaWorks; art by Maki Kouda)
- Hachigatsu no Hikari (K)
- Heart no Kuni no Alice ~Wonderful Wonder World~ (QuinRose; adapted by Soumei Hoshino)
- Heart Tsuranuite (Rurui Hoshino)
- Hinekure Shisho no Mikaiketsu Jikenroku (Runamu Kinashi)
- Hishosama Kounin! (Eriko Katou)
- Honekoe Monogatari (Matsuki Akisawa)
- Honoo no Histugi (Kou Tounomine; art by Yoshiyuki)
- Hoshi no Oujo (Mirai Soft; adapted by Haruhiko Momokawa)
- Hoshino no Oujisama (Amino Yuki)
- Houou Gakuen Misoragumi (Arata Aki)
- Ilegenes: Giyoku no Koukyoukyoku (Mizuna Kuwabara; art by Kachiru Ishizue)
- Ilegenes: Kokuyou no Kiseki (Mizuna Kuwabara; art by Kachiru Ishizue)
- Inuyomi (Runamu Kinashi)
- Izayoi no Hitomi (Naruse Takami)
- Kaguu no Perelman (Maki Kouda)
- Kapo-n (Haruka Kanda)
- Kekko na Otemae Desu. (Miyoshi Furumachi)
- Konton no Shiro (Baku Yumemakura; art by Hiro Matsuba)
- Kori Senman (Mi Tagawa)
- Koto Puzzle (Alice Arisugawa; art by Ayumi Natsumo)
- Mekurumeku (Sato Tamaru)
- Mikan-Jirou (You Futaba)
- Mitsuboshi no Elende (Rami Uchiyama)
- Monochrome Factor (Kaili Sorano) (from Comic Blade Masamune)
- Muteki no Zarathustra (Meg Noguchi)
- Nakayoshi Kouen (Warehito Nejimaki) (from Comic Blade Masamune)
- Noble Savage (Shou Satogane)
- Number (Kawori Tsubaki)
- Pangaea/Ezel (Rin Asano) (from Comic Blade Masamune)
- Princess Nightmare (Karin Entertainment; adapted by Mei Noguchi)
- Replica (Kemuri Karakara)
- Rosetta Kara no Shoutaijou (Neko Asari; art by Hajime Sato) (from Comic Blade Brownie)
- Sable Prince (Chisato Nesumi)
- Saihate Keisatsu (Kou Matsuhisa)
- Sakaime no Sumika (Shigura Matsu)
- Sangoku Rensenki: Otome no Heihou! (Daisy2; art by Maya Azu)
- Sengaku (AKIRA, art by Hinoki Kino)
- Shiina-kun no Torikemo Hyakka (Shiya Totsuki)
- Shirokuro Tsukeru? (Clay Seagod, art by Amino Yuki)
- Shiroman (Shigura Matsu)
- Shuuten Unknown (Shiho Sugiura)
- Sousoukyoku Nightmare (Arata Aki) (from Comic Blade Masamune)
- Tactics (Kazuko Higashiyama, Sakura Kinoshita) (from Comic Blade Masamune)
- Tenshou Gakuen Gekkouroku (Nyun Miyao)
- Tokyo Last Chika (Miyoshi Furumachi)
- Toukai Retrospective (Mei Noguchi)
- Toxic (Ryo Takahashi)
- Tsukuyomi (Tadashi Ota; art by Haruki Seno)
- Usahiyo (Ai Shimizu)
- Vassalord (Nanae Chrono)
- VIVO! (Fujiko Segawa)
- Will O' Wisp (Otomate; adapted by Saiko Onodera)
- Working Holiday (Tsukasa Sakaki; art by Ayako Koyama)
- Yuuma-kun no Mainichi (Yufuko Suzuki)
- Your and My Secret (Ai Morinaga) (from Monthly Comic Blade)
- Zenryoku Shōnen (You Futaba)
