= Yamada Tarō Monogatari =

Japanese manga series by Ai Morinaga

- Cover of volume 1.

山田太郎ものがたり
- Manga
- Written by: Ai Morinaga
- Published by: Kadokawa Shoten
- Magazine: Monthly Asuka
- Original run: 1996 – 2000
- Volumes: 14
- Television drama
- Produced by: Angie Chai
- Original network: Chinese Television System
- Original run: 11 August 2001 – 8 November 2001
- Episodes: 45
- Television drama
- Directed by: Yasuharu Ishii; Daisuke Yamamuro; Ryutaro Kawashima
- Original network: TBS
- Original run: July 2007 – September 2007
- Episodes: 10

Yamada Tarō Monogatari (山田太郎ものがたり, Yamada Tarō Monogatari; literally, Yamada Tarō Story) is a Japanese manga series created by Ai Morinaga. The manga series, published by Kadokawa Shoten, ran from 1996 to 2000 with a total of fourteen volumes. After the regular series ended the author came out with another special volume about the other siblings within the Yamada Family called The Tale of the Yamada Family. A Japanese television drama series adaptation was broadcast in 2007.

== Plot summary ==
Tarō Yamada is smart, athletic, and very handsome. He seems perfect on the outside, but he's actually dirt poor due to his mother's reckless spending habits and his always-gone father. Although never once does he admit it, everyone at school thinks he is a very humble rich boy because of his good looks. However, at home, he must care for his six younger siblings, who share a one-bedroom place with him and his mother.

== Live-action drama ==
=== Taiwanese TV drama ===
The manga was adapted into a 45-episode Taiwanese drama titled Poor Prince (Chinese: 貧窮貴公子; pinyin: Ping Qiong Gui Gong Zi) starring Vic Zhou, Ken Chu, Annie Yi, Edward Ou and Will Liu. It was produced by Comic Ritz International Production (可米瑞智國際藝能有限公司) and Angie Chai (柴智屏) as producer. It was broadcast in Taiwan on free-to-air Chinese Television System (CTS) (華視) from 11 August to 8 November 2001.

=== Japanese TV drama ===
山田太郎ものがたり / Yamada Tarō Monogatari: Tale of Yamada Tarō
From July to September 2007, Japanese television network TBS aired a dramatization of the story, starring Kazunari Ninomiya as Tarō and Shō Sakurai as Takuya, Tarō's wealthy best friend who occasionally offers Taro a helping hand. The Japanese version of the drama has received higher ratings and is generally more popular than the Taiwanese version. The opening theme song is "Happiness" by Arashi, the Japanese musical group, which the two stars are members of.
