= Momo Tama =

Japanese manga series

- Cover of the first volume

殲鬼戦記ももたま (Senki Senki Momotama)
- Genre: Action fantasy
- Manga
- Written by: Nanae Chrono
- Published by: Mag Garden
- English publisher: NA: Tokyopop
- Magazine: Monthly Comic Blade (2005–2009); Web Comic Beat's (2011–2015)
- Original run: 2005 – February 2015
- Volumes: 10

Momo Tama (Japanese: 殲鬼戦記ももたま, Hepburn: Senki Senki Momotama) is a Japanese manga series written and illustrated by Nanae Chrono. The manga was serialized in Mag Garden's magazine Monthly Comic Blade from 2005 to 2009 and in Web Comic Beat's from July 2011 to February 2015. Its individual chapters were collected into ten volumes.

== Plot ==
After gate-crashing onto the mythical Tougen Island also known as Shangri-La, Mutsu Kokonose, the ninth generation head of the Mutsu Clan, claims to bring down the wrath of God onto the demons and regain the island from Momotarou control.

== Characters ==
Kokonose Mutsu (陸奥九世, Mutsu Kokonose)
The nine-year-old protagonist of the story. Kokonose is the ninth generation lord of the infamous Mutsu Clan which was descended from demons. He has an arrogant personality and the guts to try to turn one of the academy teachers into his servant on his first day. Kononse was revealed to be an exceptional Exorcist, exorcising evil spirits since the age of one. During the Selection test, he was the only student who managed to acquire the legendary Peach card which was rumored to be the card that only the first generation Momotaro had ever gotten it.
Mamoru Kashii (香椎守, Kashii Mamoru)
A twenty-year-old "servant" of Kokonse. Kashii wears glasses and has a sort of Mohawk styled hair. He has an extreme negative personality and looks at everything in despair. He is revealed to possess the "Monkey" characteristic of the four types since he could not break through the iron bar during the exam.

== Publication ==
Written and illustrated by Nanae Chrono, the series began serialization in the December 2005 issue of Mag Garden's magazine Monthly Comic Blade, where the manga was serialized until the August 2009 issue. It was then transferred to Mag Garden's website Web Comic Beat's, where the manga was serialized from July 2011 to February 2015. Its individual chapters were collected into ten tankōbon volumes.

At Anime Expo 2008, Tokyopop announced that they licensed the series for English publication.

=== Volumes ===
No.	Japanese release date	Japanese ISBN
1	March 10, 2006	978-4-86-127249-3
01. "Who the Hell Do You Think I Am?"; 02. "Demon! Demon! Demon!"; 03. "Yeah, I've Got Something to Say"; 04. "The World of Our Ancestors..."
2	October 10, 2006	978-4-86-127317-9
05. "This Ain't Kids Stuff Anymore"; 06. "I Guess You're Screwed No Matter What"; 07. "I'm Right Here"; 08. "Marry Me"; 09. "A Beautiful Bride..."; 10. "Kiss My Feet"; 11. "It Was Fate That Brought Us Together"
3	September 10, 2007	978-4-86-127424-4
12. "Life Points"; 13. "Bow of Peach Wood and Arrow of Thistle, Destroyer of Calamity"; 14. "Naive Notion"; 15. "An Uninvited Guest"; 16. "Soul Cry"; 17. "Tell Me How to Use You"
4	March 10, 2008	978-4-86-127478-7
5	November 10, 2008	978-4-86-127539-5
6	August 25, 2009	978-4-86-127645-3
7	May 15, 2012	978-4-80-000000-2
8	May 15, 2013	978-4-80-000156-6
9	May 15, 2014	978-4-80-000306-5
10	May 15, 2015	978-4-80-000459-8

== Reception ==
Ben Leary of The Fandom Post had mixed feelings about the manga. He wrote that it "never bored me or aggravated" him, but also that it "doesn't make me curious enough to want to read more". Melinda Beasi of Pop Culture Shock felt the story had a "confusing start", though she praised the illustrations and side characters.
