= Monochrome Factor =

Japanese manga series

- Cover of the first volume released by Tokyopop

モノクローム·ファクター (Monokurōmu Fakutā)
- Genre: Action, supernatural
- Manga
- Written by: Kaili Sorano
- Published by: Mag Garden
- English publisher: NA: JManga; SG: Chuang Yi
- Magazine: Comic Blade Masamune (former); Monthly Comic Avarus
- Original run: May 2004 – June 15, 2011
- Volumes: 11
- Anime television series
- Directed by: Yuu Kou
- Produced by: Shinya Tagashira; Hisao Iizuka; Shigeto Sanpei; Nobuhiro Osawa
- Written by: Yuji Kawahara; Mayori Sekijima; Yuka Yamada
- Music by: Takeshi Abo; Jun Murakami
- Studio: A.C.G.T
- Licensed by: NA: Maiden Japan
- Original network: TV Tokyo, AT-X, TV Osaka
- Original run: April 7, 2008 – September 29, 2008
- Episodes: 24

Monochrome Factor (Japanese: モノクローム·ファクター, Hepburn: Monokurōmu Fakutā) is a Japanese manga series written and illustrated by Kaili Sorano. It was first serialized in Mag Garden's bi-monthly manga magazine Comic Blade Masamune in May 2004. However, when the magazine ceased publication, the manga began serialization in the new and revamped magazine, Comic Blade Avarus, in September 2007.

The manga is licensed for distribution in North America by Tokyopop, and has so far released four volumes, with the latest having been released on December 2, 2008.

An anime adaptation produced by GENCO, and animated by A.C.G.T, premiered on Japan's terrestrial television network TV Tokyo on April 7, 2008. It also aired on other networks such as AT-X and TV Osaka, though the episodes aired on TV Tokyo first.

== Plot ==
The story revolves around the high school student Akira Nikaido, a typical slacker living a normal life. That is, until he meets the mysterious Shirogane, a man who suddenly appears and tells him that they have a destiny together. When Akira hears this, he is shocked and doesn't believe a word of it. Suzuno Aya, a friend of Akira, forgets something in the school one night, and asks Akira and Kengo to help her and go find it. He agrees, and while there, he gets attacked by a shadow monster. Shirogane convinces him that the balance between the human world and the shadow world has been distorted and that Akira must become a "shin"- a creature of the shadow world- in order to help restore the balance. But if Akira stays as a "shin" he will become a shadow himself, and normal people will not see him any more. Shirogane wanted to be with him and lied that if he became his shadow he will be seen by other people again. Soon after a person called "master" told Akira that he did not need Shirogane to become his shadow because he has an object that, if he steps on it, would become his shadow, which made Akira angry at Shirogane. After, Akira notices that his friends Aya and Kengo could see Akira and Shirogane when they are "shin," so Akira decides that the two could join them and help Akira and Shirogane to get the balance back to normal.

== Characters ==
Akira Nikaido (二海堂 昶, Nikaidō Akira) Voiced by: Daisuke Ono
Akira is the 16-year-old protagonist of the series in his second year of High School. He is strong and impatient, often skipping class since he does not like school, claiming that it is boring. However, although he skips classes often, he still manages to get into the top 5 positions in the school. Also, he is very good in sports. Changing into his shadow form causes his hair to turn black, his clothing to change, and his eyes to turn red. In order for Akira to stay in his human form, in the manga he depends on Shirogane to be his shadow, while in the anime, he eventually uses a doppler item which he steps on to activate it. While in his Shin form, at first he uses a pair of daggers to fight, but later in the series they change to a more complex and larger set of blades.
Although it is said that he is of the royal line of the light, hence a Rei, the truth is that he is Ryuko's successor, being his reincarnation. At present, Akira has yet to awaken, and hence is unable to regain his memories for when he was king. However, he has awoken once before, during the time he and Kengo first met Kou, taking his Rei form to subdue and defeat Kengo, at the same time stopping Kou from doing a suicide attack. Because Ryuko had not fully regained his strength, he was unable to retain that form and reverted into Akira, who collapsed from exhaustion. Akira's memory of that event was erased by Kou along with Kengo's because he felt that the incident was too much to handle for the both of them, but Akira has recently regained that memory.
Shirogane (白銀) Voiced by: Junichi Suwabe
With his trademark black coat and a shortened top hat, and long, silvery braided hair, Shirogane is a mysterious man who appears before Akira and involves him in the fight between the shadow world and human world. He carries around a cane which, apparently, can be surged with spiritual energy to fight off Kokuchi. Shirogane hides his true personality. His way of speech changes from a soft, mild tone to one with a sharp tongue. His usual calm, smiling side becomes more cold and aggressive. He is of the royal line of the shadow. In the manga, after switching personalities, his cane changes to a katana and therefore, able to slice Nanaya's arm off. In the anime, Shirogane appears to have a romantic interest in Akira, but it is not evident in the manga. In the manga, he appears to have a romantic interest in Ryuko instead.
Kengo Asamura (浅村 賢吾, Asamura Kengo) Voiced by: Hiroshi Kamiya
16-year-old Kengo is in the same class as Akira, and usually hangs out with him. Despite Akira's distant approach, the two share a deep friendship. He has a very cheerful disposition. His latent abilities were activated in his desire to help his older sister. He usually fights using his own body, and uses Al Cesta gloves given to him by Akira/Shirogane, which takes the form of gauntlets in battle that seemingly increases Kengo's strength.
In the manga, he is revealed to be a factor of darkness, which grants him a greater tolerance to the effects of being in the shadow world. However, it causes him to go berserk if he absorbed too much darkness, causing him to attack anyone, friend or foe alike. While berserk, he has displayed enhanced physical strength, and the ability to summon Kokuchi. Kou had previously sealed this part of him away (with seals so strong that even Shirogane could not detect that Kengo was a factor) when they first met, but the seal was released when Homurabi found Kengo in chapter 12. Kengo dies after the dark tuner is taken from him in the manga.
Aya Suzuno (鈴野 綾, Suzuno Aya) Voiced by: Masumi Asano
Another 16-year-old student in Akira's class, Aya is part of its Disciplinary Committee, and has a strong sense of justice. She has a very direct personality and is very skilled in kendo. As such, she uses her kendo while fighting Kokuchi. Her Kuresame, given to her by Shirogane, gives her yoroi and a katana to use in battle. In the manga, her Kuresame later gets upgraded due to her will to fight during her battle with Lulu, granting her new armor and another sword. It is also revealed during the battle that Aya is much stronger and more efficient at using two swords rather than one.
Haruka Kujo (九条 悠, Kujō Haruka) Voiced by: Mitsuki Saiga
An 11-year-old American university graduate, who befriends Akira. He wore an earring on his right ear which he constantly touches. He is rich and lives in a huge mansion. He is the successor to the Kujo family, known for its daemonic experiments using traditional techniques of yin and yang. His parents, brother and grand father died when he was 3 years old. To atone for his ancestors' sins, Haruka volunteers to fight the Kokuchi alongside Akira, despite him not being able to physically fight them but later in the anime, his real identity was revealed. He uses a crossbow specifically design to eliminate Kokuchis. Haruka was created specifically for the anime and does not appear in the manga.
Shuichi Wagatsuma a.k.a. Master (マスター/我妻 秋一, Masutā / Wagatsuma Shūichi) Voiced by: Wataru Hatano
Shuichi is an acquaintance of Shirogane's, and owns a bar named 'Bar Still' and under it is "Since 2001". He is commonly called "Master". Even though he is blind, his Reiken allows him to sense Shin and Kokuchi. He also has an ability that allows him to cure others, albeit a little painfully. In the manga, he is revealed to be Shisui, the other King of Rei who went into hiding.
Mayu Asamura (浅村 麻結, Asamura Mayu) Voiced by: Ami Koshimizu
Kengo's older sister. Master taught her how to exorcise evil spirits. Obsessed with attractive guys, she was once possessed by a kokuchi but was saved by Kengo and Akira. She continues harboring her yen for bishōnen. A running gag in the series is her increased obsessiveness for attractive guys when she's drunk, including both Akira and Master.
Lulu (ルル, Lulu) Voiced by: Yukari Tamura
A girl who dresses in a Gothic Lolita fashion and has a pink pigtailed hair. She is a subordinate of Nanaya (in the anime) and appears to know Shirogane as well. She also seems to be flirtatious around Akira, but automatically expresses a dislike for Aya, seeing her as a 'gorilla woman' and 'small breast'. She uses a whip as her weapon and has the ability to drain someone's strength. One of Homurabi's five "children" in the manga, who later runs away and joins Akira's group after being defeated by Aya because she was frightened of being killed if she had returned.
Nanaya (七夜, Nanaya) Voiced by: Hiroyuki Yoshino
A mysterious, blue-haired man who wears an eye patch and under it were 3 vertical gashes. He is initially portrayed as the main antagonist, able to control Kokuchi in order to possess people, but it is later revealed that he's working for the King of the Shadow world. Overestimating himself led him to his death. In the manga, he is initially thought to have been killed by Homurabi, but Akira and Shriogane later find him while searching for the Shadow castle, while Haruka finished him off with his crossbow in the anime. One of Homurabi's five "children" in the manga.
Kou (洸, Kō) Voiced by: Katsuyuki Konishi
One of the Rei, and a perverted 25-year-old friend to both Akira and Kengo from an event that occurred several years ago. They call him 'Kou-nii' in anime while Haruka calls him 'Onii-chan' as Kou insists. Loyal to Ryuko, and is one of Ryuko's five "children" in the manga. On the outside, he has a unique personality, though he actually hides a deep guilt about fleeing from battle and abandoning Ryuko. This fuels his desire to protect Akira at all costs, even if it meant losing his life. In the manga, he has an ability to drain darkness out from other's bodies with his unusually long canine teeth, an ability he has exhibited twice (once off screen) in order to return Kengo back to normal. He resembles a vampire when doing so. He has straps all over his body that serve as a power restrictor. In the manga he's revealed as a special 'child' of Ryuko that didn't die along with Ryuko as 'children' are supposed to with their king. His real form is that of a white wolf which is why Lulu continues to call him Poochy.
Ryuko (劉黒, Ryūko)
King of the Rei, opposite of the Shin. Akira's "Ō" (King) form also the "counterpart" of Shirogane. His black hair grows longer and his attire changes into a long white coat with straps around his wrist, and two belts around his waist. His weapon also changes to a white/silver scythe with a long lavender reddish/pinkish cloth hanging off. He was murdered by Homurabi before Akira was even born. Although he has yet to awaken in the present time, and his memories continue to remain sealed within Akira, he has awoken once before, during the time Akira and Kengo first met Kou. Because Ryuko had not fully regained his strength, he was unable to remain in his Rei form for long, although he defeated Kengo with relative ease. Before he reverted, he told Kou that he never thought of Kou as a betrayer from the beginning, and told him to "repent" by protecting Akira if he still felt guilty about abandoning him. In chapter 54, it was revealed that he was purposely killed by Sawaki by the order of Homurabi.
Homurabi (焔緋) Voiced by: Ryōtarō Okiayu
Along with Shirogane, he was a former king of the Shadow World, but in order to become its sole dictator, he exiled Shirogane. He leads a rogue group of Shins known as his "children." Has a ruthless and sadistic nature with a cold personality. In the anime, he used Haruka to unleash the darkness sealed in Mt. Fuji but was stopped when Akira talked some sense to the boy before he could insert the key, which happens to be his left earring.
Hiryu (氷瀏, Hiryū)
One of Homurabi's five "children" in the manga who has the power to manipulate ice.It is implied that her body belongs to Homurabi but her life came from Ryuko. She was killed by Akira. After her death, Ryuko showed in front of Akira telling him that he kept all of his memories and knowledge within her.
Sawaki (澤木)
Another one of Homurabi's five "children" in the manga. Implied to have been involved in the death of Ryuko. He had briefly met Kengo in the past when a young Akira and Kengo ran past him on their way to school. He is also the one who murdered Ryuko by the order of Homurabi.
Shiki (志紀)
A misguided young boy who is able to manipulate a substance dubbed as "shadow matter." He is one of Homurabi's five "children" in the manga.

== Media ==
=== Manga ===
The Monochrome Factor manga series is created by Kaili Sorano. It was first serialized in Mag Garden's Japanese bi-monthly manga magazine Comic Blade Masamune in May 2004. When the Masamune magazine ceased publication on June 15, 2007, the manga began serialization in the new and revamped magazine, Comic Blade Avarus, in September 2007.

As of December 10, 2009, a total of eight tankōbon have been released in Japan. The release date of the ninth volume has not yet been announced.

The manga is licensed for distribution in North America by Tokyopop. The first volume was released on January 2, 2008, and the fourth and latest volume was released on December 2, 2008.

No.	Original release date	Original ISBN	North American release date	North American ISBN
1	April 10, 2005	4-86127-132-0	January 2, 2008	1-4278-0069-3
2	December 10, 2005	4-86127-216-5	May 13, 2008	1-4278-0070-7
3	September 10, 2006	4-86127-291-2	September 9, 2008	1-4278-0775-2
4	September 10, 2007	4-86127-399-4	December 2, 2008	1-4278-1239-X
5	March 28, 2008	4-86127-486-9	—	—
6	September 10, 2008	4-86127-534-2	—	—
7	March 10, 2009	4-86127-605-5	—	—
8	December 10, 2009	4-86127-682-9	—	—
9	July 24, 2010	978-4-86127-748-1	—	—
10	March 2, 2011	978-4-86127-829-7	—	—
11	November 30, 2011	978-4-86127-748-1	—	—

=== Anime ===
The anime premiered on the Japanese television network TV Tokyo on April 7, 2008. It broadcast a total of twenty-four episodes, with the last of which airing on September 29, 2008. Though the episodes aired on TV Tokyo first, the series also aired on other networks such as AT-X and TV Osaka within days of the original broadcast. Shochiku distributed the episodes over a span of eight DVD volumes, with each compilation containing three episodes. The first volume was released on August 8, 2008, and the eighth was released on March 13, 2009.

Maiden Japan have licensed the series for a North American home video release.

=== Music ===
Three pieces of theme music are used for the episodes: one opening theme and two ending themes. The opening theme is "Metamorphose" which is performed by Asriel and written by Kokomi. The ending themes are "Awake ~my everything~" (AWAKE 〜僕のすべて〜, Awake ~boku no subete~) by Daisuke Ono and Hiroshi Kamiya, and "Kakusei ~Dark and Light~" (Kakusei 〜Dark and Light〜) by Junichi Suwabe and Katsuyuki Konishi. Both ending themes are written by Yumi Matsuzawa, and the four performing artists are also voice actors for the series. Asriel released a single for "Metamorphose" on April 23, 2008. The singles for "Awake ~my everything~" and "Kakuse ~Dark and Light~" were released on May 28 and August 27 of 2008, respectively.

=== Video game ===
A video game of Monochrome Factor for the PlayStation 2 was released on November 27, 2008, called Monochrome Factor Cross Road. It is a dating sim adventure game and will encompass new characters.

== Reception ==
Carlo Santos of Anime News Network said that the manga is a "ripoff of a ripoff" which has a "complete lack of creativity" even though it has neat visual effects, effective action scenes, and some characters which "characters." He also criticized the series for having "really dumb plot holes" and said that apart from the humor, entertainment value in the series can be found in action scenes and "Akira's visions of the shadow world." He concludes that the series "does very little to make the reader want to keep going."

Angel Wilson of The Geekiary called the series humorous and "visually beautiful," while praising the "wonderful cast of side characters." Wilson called the relationship between Akira and Shirogane as massively tear inducing and praised it as a yaoi anime.
