= Edward Ou =

Taiwanese actor and television host

- Born: 16 October 1980 (age 44); Taiwan
- Occupation: actor
- Years active: 2001–2005

Edward Ou (Chinese: 歐定興; pinyin: ōu dìng xīng) was born on 16 October 1980 in Taiwan. He is a Taiwanese actor and TV host. He graduated from Taipei Hwa Kang Arts School in 1998.

Ou is junior to other Taiwanese entertainers such as Barbie Hsu, whom he co-starred with in the Meteor Garden series, and Dee Hsu; and senior to Alien Huang, Rainie Yang, Genie Chuo and Cyndi Wang. He and Show Luo are disciples as TV hosts to Hu Gua.

== Filmography ==
=== TV series ===
Year	English title	Chinese title	Role
2001	Meteor Garden	流星花園	Chen Qing He (陳青和)
2001	Poor Prince	貧窮貴公子	次郎
2001	Peach Girl	蜜桃女孩	OD
2002	Meteor Garden II	流星花園 II	Chen Qing He (陳青和)
2002	Come to My Place	來我家吧	荒木
2003	The Original Scent of Summer	原味的夏天	楊鐵生
2004	Say Yes Enterprise	求婚事務所	Chapter four: Graduate 地獄拉麵

== Soundtrack contribution ==
- 2002 – "Close To You" – Meteor Garden II Original Soundtrack

== TV Host ==
- Asia Entertainment Centre – Azio TV
- Boyz Adventure (惡童探險記) – Azio TV
- 100% Entertainment – Gala Television (GTV) Variety Show/CH 28
- TVBS G-Entertainment (tvbs G娛樂主播)
