= Ai Morinaga =

Japanese manga artist (1981–2019)

Ai Morinaga (森永あい, Morinaga Ai) (28 April 1981 – 2 August 2019) was a Japanese manga artist from Okayama Prefecture. Among her best-known series are Your and My Secret and My Heavenly Hockey Club. Morinaga's last work was Kirara no Hoshi, which was published in Betsufure magazine from 2010 to 2015.

Morinaga died on August 2, 2019.

== Manga Works ==
- Duck Prince (あひるの王子さま, Ahiru No Ōjisama)
- Kirara no Hoshi
- My Heavenly Hockey Club
- Maniattemasu
- Strawberry chan no Karei na Seikatsu (The Gorgeous Life of Strawberry-chan)
- Yamada Taro Monogatari
- Yamada Taro Monogatari Special Edition
- Your and My Secret
- Welcome to Cosmos Apartment House (one-shot)
