= Mikako Takahashi =

Japanese voice actress

- 高橋 美佳子
- Born: May 29, 1980 (age 46); Chiba Prefecture, Japan
- Occupations: Voice actress; singer
- Years active: 1998–present
- Agent: I'm Enterprise
- Notable work: Arcana Heart as Heart Aino; Grenadier as Rushuna Tendou; Elemental Gelade as Reverie Metherlence; Hanbun no Tsuki ga Noboru Sora as Rika Akiba; Aria the Scarlet Ammo as Shirayuki Hotogi; Gin Tama as Sadaharu and Tsu Terakado
- Height: 159.3 cm (5 ft 3 in)

Mikako Takahashi (高橋 美佳子, Takahashi Mikako; born May 29, 1980) is a Japanese voice actress and J-Pop singer from Chiba Prefecture, Japan. As the Excel Saga character Mikako Hyatt, she forms one half of the voice acting duo The Excel Girls (the other half being Yumiko Kobayashi). She is employed by I'm Enterprise. She is also the best knowing dubbing roles of Korean drama and films, like for Park Shin-hye, Shin So-yul and others. In January 2017, she wrote in her private blog that she has been married since the last day of 2016.

== Filmography ==
=== Anime ===
1999

- Space Pirate Mito (1999), Azuki
- Aoi & Mutsuki: A Pair of Queens (1999), Azuki
- Infinite Ryvius (1999), Kibure Kikki, Lilith Frau
- Excel Saga (1999), Mikako Hyatt

2000

- Hand Maid May (2000), Kasumi Tani

2001

- Strawberry Eggs (2001), Fujio Himejima
- Gear Fighter Dendoh (2001), Saki
- The Prince of Tennis (2001), Sakuno Ryuuzaki

2002

- Aquarian Age: Sign for Evolution (2002), Kaede Morino
- Full Metal Panic! (2002), Tomomi Isomura
- Samurai Deeper Kyo (2002), Makoto & Mahiro
- Gravion (2002), Tuile

2003

- L/R: Licensed by Royalty (2003), Noel Adelaide
- Popotan (2003), Miyuki
- Yami to Bōshi to Hon no Tabibito (2003), Voice of the Letter
- Crush Gear Nitro (2003), Natsumi Maeda
- Peace Maker Kurogane (2003), Saya, Saizo the Pig

2004

- Uta∽Kata (2004), Ai Niwa
- Elfen Lied (2004), No. 3
- Grenadier (2004), Rushuna Tendo
- Gravion Zwei (2004), Tuile
- Fullmetal Alchemist (2004), Woman
- Gundam Seed Destiny (2004), Kira Yamato (child)
- Burst Angel (2004), Amy
- Magical Girl Lyrical Nanoha (2004), Chrono Harlaown, Player (ep 3)
- Maria Watches Over Us (2004), Chisato Tanuma
- Maria Watches Over Us Season 2: Printemps (2004), Chisato Tanuma
- Midori Days (2004), Rin (Young)
- Rockman.EXE Stream (2004), Romeda Andou

2005

- Ichigo 100% (2005), Tomoko
- Elemental Gelade (2005), Reverie "Ren" Metherlence
- Karin (2005), Maki Tokitou
- Canvas 2: Niji Iro no Sketch (2005), Tomoko Fujinami
- Honey and Clover (2005), Ayumi Yamada
- Magical Girl Lyrical Nanoha A's (2005), Chrono Harlaown

2006

- Gintama (2006), Sadaharu, Tsū Terakado
- Simoun (2006), Rodoreamon
- Girl's High (2006), Mari Saionji
- Super Robot Wars OG: Divine Wars (2006), Kusuha Mizuha
- The Familiar of Zero (2006), Montmorency
- Tactical Roar (2006), Watatsumi Tsubasa
- Ghost Slayers Ayashi (2006), Older Sister (ep 1)
- Bartender (2006), Mika
- Honey and Clover II (2006), Ayumi Yamada
- Hanbun no Tsuki ga Noboru Sora (2006), Rika Akiba
- Black Blood Brothers (2006), Hibari Kusunogi
- My-Otome (2006), Rosalie Claudel
- Mamoru-kun ni Megami no Shukufuku o! (2006), Ayako Takasu
- Renkin 3-kyuu Magical? Pokahn (2006), Youko

2007

- Idolmaster Xenoglossia (2007), Sorewa Suzuki
- Ikki Tousen: Dragon Destiny (2007), Hakugen Rikuson, Teni
- Sisters of Wellber (2007), Rita Ciol
- Engage Planet Kiss Dum (2007), Miki (eps 9–10)
- The Familiar of Zero: Knight of the Twin Moons (2007), Montmorency
- Nagasarete Airantou (2007), Machi
- Hayate the Combat Butler (2007), Ayumu Nishizawa
- Neuro: Supernatural Detective (2007), Ruri Himemiya (ep 2)
- Magical Girl Lyrical Nanoha StrikerS (2007), Caro Ru Lushe, Friedrich (baby form)
- Rental Magica (2007), Adilicia Ren Mathers

2008

- Real Drive (2008), Emi Miaya (eps 12–14)
- Ikki Tousen: Great Guardians (2008), Hakugen Rikuson
- Sisters of Wellber Zwei (2008), Rita Sior
- Glass Maiden (2008), Ayaka
- Kemeko Deluxe! (2008), Izumi Makihara
- Kure-nai (2008), Kirihiko Kirishima
- The Familiar of Zero: Rondo of Princesses (2008), Montmorency
- Birdy the Mighty: Decode (2008), Hazumi Senkawa
- To Love-Ru (2008), Akiho Sairenji
- Someday's Dreamers II Sora (2008), Hiyori Yamabuki
- Mōryō no Hako (2008), Yoriko Kusumoto
- Our Home's Fox Deity (2008), Gyokuyou (female)
- 夢想夏郷, 東方 (Touhou Musou Kakyou / A Summer Day's Dream) (2008), Patchouli Knowledge

2009

- Aoi Bungaku Series (2009), Melos' Sister
- Kanamemo (2009), Kanamemo
- Queen's Blade: The Exiled Virgin (2009), Nowa
- Queen's Blade 2: The Evil Eye (2009), Nowa
- The Beast Player Erin (2009), Semiya
- Chrome Shelled Regios (2009), Leerin Marfes
- Shangri-La (2009), Kuniko Houjou
- The Sacred Blacksmith (2009), Penelope
- The Girl Who Leapt Through Space (2009), Madoka
- Birdy the Mighty Decode:02 (2009), Hazumi Senkawa
- Hayate the Combat Butler!! (2009), Ayumu Nishizawa
- Maria Watches Over Us 4th Season (2009), Chisato Tanuma (ep 12)

2010

- Ikki Tousen: Xtreme Xecutor (2010), Ten'i, Hakugen Rikuson
- Ōkami-san & Her Seven Companions (2010), Ami Jizō (eps 7–8)
- Super Robot Wars OG: The Inspector (2010), Kusuha Mizuha
- The Legend of the Legendary Heroes (2010), Noa Ehn
- Motto To Love Ru (2010), Akiho Sairenji

2011

- Gintama' (2011), Sadaharu
- The Mystic Archives of Dantalian (2011), Boy A (ep 3)
- Chibi Devi! (2011), Rai
- Dog Days (2011), Rebecca Anderson
- Battle Spirits: Heroes (2011), Mika Kisaragi
- Aria the Scarlet Ammo (2011), Shirayuki Hotogi
- Dream Eater Merry (2011), Cat Nurse A (ep 6), Serio (ep 2)

2012

- Accel World (2012), Chrome Disaster (ep 12)
- Girls und Panzer (2012), Yuzu Koyama
- The Pet Girl of Sakurasou (2012), Koharu Shirayama
- Shakugan no Shana III (2012), Westshore
- The Familiar of Zero F (2012), Montmorency
- Tanken Driland (2012), Bayonet Wielder Gina
- Muv-Luv Alternative: Total Eclipse (2012), Kai Shimako
- Dog Days' (2012), Rebecca Anderson
- Hayate the Combat Butler: Can't Take My Eyes Off You (2012), Ayumu Nishizawa
- Hunter × Hunter (2011) (2012), Eeta, Elena, Greed Island Auctioneer

2013

- Kiniro Mosaic (2013), Shinobu's mother (eps 1–12)
- Kotoura-san (2013), Muroto's mother (ep 8)
- Servant × Service (2013), Tanaka-san
- Hayate the Combat Butler! Cuties (2013), Ayumu Nishizawa

2014

- Girl Friend BETA (2014), Shiori Shiratori
- Strike the Blood (2014), Aya Tokoyogi/Lee Blue (eps 15–19)
- SoniAni: Super Sonico the Animation (2014), Satsuki Imori (ep 7)
- D-Frag! (2014), Sakura Mizukami
- Future Card Buddyfight (2014), Suzuha Amanosuzu
- Magical Warfare (2014), Momoka Shijō
- Lady Jewelpet (2014), Lady Elena

2015

- Gintama (2015), Sadaharu, Sekitobaharu
- Shokugeki no Soma (2015), Jun Shiomi
- Tantei Kageki Milky Holmes TD (2015), Masako Orishimo (ep 4)
- Dog Days (2015), Rebecca Anderson
- To Love Ru: Darkness (2015), Akiho Sairenji
- Aria the Scarlet Ammo Double A (2015), Shirayuki Hotogi
- Magical Girl Lyrical Nanoha ViVid (2015), Caro Ru Lushe, Friedrich (baby form)

2016

- Dimension W (2016), Sophia (ep 9)
- Haven't You Heard? I'm Sakamoto (2016), Erika
- Fūka (2017), Maya Haruna

2018

- High School DxD Hero, Venelana Gremory
- Idolish7, Yoshimi
- March Comes In like a Lion, Mikako Kawamoto

2019

- Detective Conan, Kaho Mizunuma
- Domestic Girlfriend, Ayano

2020

- Fruits Basket: 2nd season, Satsuki Sohma

2021

- Tropical-Rouge! Pretty Cure, Narumi Ichinose

2024

- Chillin' in Another World with Level 2 Super Cheat Powers, Tsuya

=== Animated films ===
- Magical Girl Lyrical Nanoha The Movie 1st (2010), Chrono Harlaown
- Hayate the Combat Butler! Heaven Is a Place on Earth (2011), Ayumu Nishizawa
- Magical Girl Lyrical Nanoha The Movie 2nd A's (2012), Chrono Harlaown
- Gintama: The Movie: The Final Chapter: Be Forever Yorozuya (2013), Sadaharu
- Girls und Panzer der Film (2015), Yuzu Koyama
- Girls und Panzer das Finale: Part 1 (2017), Yuzu Koyama
- Magical Girl Lyrical Nanoha Reflection (2017), Chrono Harlaown
- Magical Girl Lyrical Nanoha Detonation (2018), Chrono Harlaown
- Girls und Panzer das Finale: Part 2 (2019), Yuzu Koyama
- Girls und Panzer das Finale: Part 3 (2021), Yuzu Koyama
- Girls und Panzer das Finale: Part 4 (2023), Yuzu Koyama

=== Drama CD ===
- Hand Maid May Non Scramble CD Drama (2000), Kasumi Tani

=== Video games ===
- Arcana Heart series as Heart Aino
- Super Heroine Chronicle (2014) as Shirayuki Hotogi
- Granblue Fantasy as Maria Theresa
- Arknights as Tomimi

=== Dubbing ===
- Park Shin-hye
  - Doctor Crush as Yoo Hye-jung
  - Flower Boys Next Door as Go Dok-mi
  - The Heirs as Cha Eun-sang
  - Pinocchio as Choi In-ha
  - You're Beautiful as Ko Mi-nyeo/Gemma and Ko Mi-nam
  - You've Fallen for Me as Lee Gyu-won
- Shin So-yul
  - Penny Pinchers as Ha Kyung-joo
  - Whatcha Wearin'? as So-yeon
- Cloud Atlas as Sonmi-451 (Doona Bae)
- Mother, May I Sleep with Danger? as Leah Lewisohn
- Silenced as Seo Yoo-jin (Jung Yu-mi)
- 12 Signs of Love as Oh Hae-ra (Bae Geu-rin)

=== Live-action films ===
- Gintama, Sadaharu (voice)
