= Keitarō Arima =

Japanese manga artist

- Born: January 13, 1969 (age 57); Osaka, Japan
- Occupation: Manga artist
- Writing career
- Pen name: Pitarō Arima, Pīttarō Arima, Haruo Arima

Keitarō Arima (有馬 啓太郎, Arima Keitarō; born on January 13, 1969) is a Japanese manga artist, best known as the creator of Tsukuyomi: Moon Phase. He was a member of the Manga Dōkōkai OB at Kansai University. His pen names include Pitarō Arima (有馬 秘太郎, Arima Pitarō), Haruo Arima (有馬 晴臣, Arima Haruo) and Pīttarō Arima (有馬 ピーッ太郎, Arima Pīttarō).

== Works ==
- Astro Fujo-san (Kadokawa Shoten, ISBN 4-04-713605-0)
- Eromanō (as Pīttarō Arima, Kaiōsha, ISBN 4-87724-210-4)
- Okiraku Gokuraku Nosutorazamasu (Comic Gum, Wani Books, 2 volumes)
- Tsukuyomi: Moon Phase (Comic Gum, Wani Books, 16 volumes)
- Uripo!
