= List of Ikki Tousen episodes =

Cover of the Ikki Tousen Season 1 DVD box set released by Media Factory on January 25, 2008

Ikki Tousen is an anime television series based on the manga by Yuji Shiozaki, published by Wani Books and serialized in the seinen manga magazine Comic GUM. The anime is produced by J.C. Staff, directed by Takashi Watanabe, series composition by Takao Yoshioka, music by Hiroshi Motokura and Project IKKI, characters by Shinya Hasegawa, and produced by Nobuhiro Osawa and Yuji Matsukura. The series revolves around an all-out turf war in the Kanto region of Japan where fighters from seven schools battle for supremacy, and the story centers on Hakufu Sonsaku, a fighter from the West who transfers to Nanyo Academy. The anime is loosely based on the Chinese novel Romance of the Three Kingdoms, and the characters in the series are based on the characters from the Three Kingdoms novel.

The series aired 13 episodes on AT-X from July 30 to October 22, 2003, with subsequent runs on TVK, Mie TV, Chiba TV, TV Saitama, and Sun Television. The opening theme is "Drivin' Through The Night" by M.o.v.e while the two ending themes are "Let me be with you" by Shela for episodes 1–7, and Fate by Masumi Asano for episodes 8–13. Seven DVD volumes were released by Media Factory between November 22, 2003, and May 25, 2004. A DVD box set was later released on January 25, 2008, and a Blu-ray box set will be released on April 27, 2011. The series was licensed in North America by Geneon Entertainment and Enoki Films, who released the series on four DVD volumes between August 10, 2004, and March 1, 2005. A box set was later released on July 19, 2005, by Geneon. The series is now licensed by Funimation Entertainment, and released a box set of the series on May 26, 2009. The series is also licensed in Australia and New Zealand by Madman Entertainment and in the United Kingdom by MVM Films.

A second season, called Ikki Tousen: Dragon Destiny (一騎当千 Dragon Destiny, Ikkitōsen Doragon Desutinī), aired 12 episodes on AT-X between February 26, 2007, and May 14, 2007, with subsequent broadcasts on Chiba TV, KBS Kyoto, TV Kanagawa, Tokyo MX, Sun Television, TV Aichi, and TV Saitama. Produced by ARMS, the series is directed by Koichi Ohata, series composition by Takao Yoshioka, music by Yasuharu Takanashi, characters by Rin-Sin, and produced by Osamu Koshinaka, Shinsaku Tanaka, Takuro Hatakeyama, and Yoshikazu Beniya. The opening theme is "HEART&SOUL" by Mai Kariyuki while the ending theme is Garasu no Hana (硝子の花, "Glass Flower") by IORI. Six DVD volumes were released by Media Factory between July 25, 2007, and November 22, 2007. The DVD volumes contain an original video animation called Dragon Destiny: Great Battle at the Red Cliffs Hot Springs (Dragon Destiny 赤壁温泉大決戦, Doragon Desutinī: Sekiheki Onsen Dai Kessen), featuring the female cast in a hot spring setting. A DVD box set was later released on December 22, 2009. The anime is licensed in North America by Media Blasters, who released the series on three DVD volumes between November 24, 2009, and April 20, 2010. A box set was later released on August 31, 2010. The anime is also licensed in Australia and New Zealand by Madman Entertainment, as with the first season.

A third season, Ikki Tousen: Great Guardians (一騎当千 Great Guardians, Ikkitōsen Gurēto Gādianzu), aired 12 episodes on AT-X between June 11 and August 27, 2008, with subsequent broadcasts on Chiba TV, TV Saitama, TV Aichi, TV Kanagawa, Sun Television, and Tokyo MX. Produced by ARMS, the series is directed by Koichi Ohata, series composition by Masanao Akahoshi, music by Yasuharu Takanashi, characters by Rin Shin, and produced by Hisato Usui, Nobusaku Tanaka, Osamu Ecchu, Takuro Hatakeyama, and Yasuhiro Mikami. The opening theme is "No x limit" by Ami while the ending theme is "Kage: Shape of Shadow" (影～shape of shadow～) by Rio Asaba. Six DVD compilation volumes were released by Media Factory between September 25, 2008, and February 25, 2009, each volume containing an original video animation called Battle Tour Club: Sexy Cosplay♥Dangerous Jobs♥ (バトルツアークラブ･セクシーコスプレ♥危険なアルバイト♥). A DVD boxset was released on March 25, 2010. The series was licensed by Media Blasters, as with the second season, but it is now licensed by Funimation Entertainment after they withdrew the license.

A fourth season of the series, called Ikki Tousen: Xtreme Xecutor (一騎当千 XTREME XECUTOR, Ikkitōsen Ekustorīmu Eguzekutā), was announced. Produced by TNK and ARMS, the series is directed and written by Koichi Ohata, music by Yasuharu Takanashi, characters by Rin Shin and Junji Goto, and produced by Hiromasa Minami, Hisato Usui, Keisuke Kawai, Shinsaku Tanaka, and Takuro Hatakeyama. The series aired twelve episodes on AT-X between March 26 and June 11, 2010, with subsequent broadcasts on Chiba TV, TVK, TV Saitama, Tokyo MX, TV Aichi, and Sun Television. The opening theme is "Stargazer" by Yuka Masuda while the ending theme is "Endless Soul: Endless Warrior" (Endless Soul 〜終わりなき戦士, Endless Soul ~Owarinaki Senshi) by Masumi Asano and Aya Endo. Six DVD and Blu-ray volumes were released by Media Factory between June 25 and November 25, 2010. The DVD/BDs contains an original video animation called Ikki Tousen: Xtreme Xecutor - A Dream's Six Views (一騎当千 XTREME XECUTOR 〜ユメ六景〜). Xtreme Xecutor is licensed in North America by Funimation Entertainment, as with the first and third seasons.

An original video animation, called Ikki Tousen: Shūgaku Tōshi Keppu-roku (一騎当千 集鍔闘士血風録) was announced by Media Factory, and a promotional video was posted on their YouTube channel. The OVA was released in Japanese theaters on November 12, 2011. It was later released on DVD and Blu-ray on February 22, 2012, by Media Factory. Funimation released the DVD box-set of Great Guardians on December 31, 2013. Funimation included the OVA as part of their Xtreme Xecutor DVD Box Set in North America.

A 3-episode OVA titled Ikki Tousen: Western Wolves was released between January 3, 2019, to February 27, 2019. The anime's director is Takashi Watanabe, while Masaya Honda returns as series composition.

An anime television series adaptation of Shin Ikki Tousen (真・一騎当千) was announced on July 2, 2021. It is produced by Arms and directed by Rion Kujo, with scripts written by Masaya Honda, character designs handled by Rin-Sin and Tsutomu Miyazawa, and music composed by Yasuharu Takanashi. The series aired on AT-X from May 17 to 31, 2022, and ran for three episodes. The theme song is "Proud Stars" by Konomi Suzuki.

== Series overview ==
Season	Episodes	Originally released	
Season	Episodes	First released	Last released
Ikki Tousen	13	July 20, 2003	October 22, 2003
Dragon Destiny	12	February 26, 2007	May 14, 2007
Great Guardians	12	June 11, 2008	August 27, 2008
Xtreme Xecutor	12	March 26, 2010	June 11, 2010
Shin Ikki Tousen	3	May 17, 2022	May 31, 2022

== Episode list ==
=== Ikki Tousen (2003) ===
No.	Translated title/Funimation's dub title (Note: Titles in this season were listed as numbers. The Funimation dub has a different title.)	Original release date
1	"One" / "The Champions"; Transliteration: "Ichi" (Japanese: 壱)	July 30, 2003
2	"Two" / "Confrontation with the Big Four of Nanyo High!"; Transliteration: "Ni" (Japanese: 弐)	August 6, 2003
3	"Three" / "My Virtue is in Danger!"; Transliteration: "San" (Japanese: 参)	August 13, 2003
4	"Four" / "A Duel! Taishiji vs. Sonsaku"; Transliteration: "Yon" (Japanese: 四)	August 20, 2003
5	"Five" / "Get Angry, Hakufu! The School of Counterattack!"; Transliteration: "Go" (Japanese: 伍)	August 27, 2003
6	"Six" / "The Bloody Big Fighters Tournament!"; Transliteration: "Roku" (Japanese: 六)	September 3, 2003
7	"Seven" / "The Fatal Confrontation!"; Transliteration: "Nana" (Japanese: 七)	September 10, 2003
8	"Eight" / "Goei's Betrayal! Why?"; Transliteration: "Hachi" (Japanese: 八)	September 17, 2003
9	"Nine" / "Viva La Hot Spring!"; Transliteration: "Kyuu" (Japanese: 九)	September 24, 2003
10	"Ten" / "The Sho Haou Encounters the Devil!"; Transliteration: "Jitsu" (Japanese: 拾)	October 1, 2003
11	"Eleven" / "Ryofu, Her Love and Death!"; Transliteration: "Jitsu Ichi" (Japanese: 拾壱)	October 8, 2003
12	"Twelve" / "Summer Comes to a Watermelon Field"; Transliteration: "Jitsu Ni" (Japanese: 拾弐)	October 15, 2003
13	"Thirteen" / "Good-bye Hakufu! The Battle Days!"; Transliteration: "Jitsu San" (Japanese: 拾参)	October 22, 2003

=== Ikki Tousen: Dragon Destiny (2007) ===
No. overall	No. in season	Title	Original release date
14	1	"Signs of the Dragon Spirit"; Transliteration: "Ryūkon Taidō" (Japanese: 龍魂胎動)	February 26, 2007
15	2	"The Evil Lord Awakens"; Transliteration: "Maō Kakusei" (Japanese: 魔王覚醒)	March 5, 2007
16	3	"Bloodshed and Tears"; Transliteration: "Rūketsu Rakusei" (Japanese: 流血落涙)	March 12, 2007
17	4	"Chance Meeting of the Two Dragons"; Transliteration: "Niryū Kaikō" (Japanese: 弐龍邂逅)	March 19, 2007
18	5	"Ruthless Fighters"; Transliteration: "Tōshi Muzan" (Japanese: 闘士無惨)	March 26, 2007
19	6	"Encounter with the Crouching Dragon"; Transliteration: "Fukuryū Hōchaku" (Japanese: 伏龍逢着)	April 2, 2007
20	7	"Kanu Surrenders"; Transliteration: "Kan'u Tōkō" (Japanese: 関羽投降)	April 9, 2007
21	8	"The Little Conqueror's Heroic Death"; Transliteration: "Shōhaō Sanga" (Japanese: 小覇王散華)	April 16, 2007
22	9	"Friendships in Chaos"; Transliteration: "Yūgi Metsuretsu" (Japanese: 友義滅裂)	April 23, 2007
23	10	"The Wandering Koukin"; Transliteration: "Kōrin Ruten" (Japanese: 公瑾流転)	April 30, 2007
24	11	"Fighter Melee"; Transliteration: "Tōshi Ransen" (Japanese: 闘士乱戦)	May 7, 2007
25	12	"Red Cliffs in Flames"; Transliteration: "Sekiheki Enjō" (Japanese: 赤壁炎上)	May 14, 2007

=== Ikki Tousen: Great Guardians (2008) ===
No. overall	No. in season	Title	Original release date
26	1	"War Is of Vital Importance to the State"; Transliteration: "Hei wa Kuni no Daiji nari" (Japanese: 兵は国の大事なり)	June 11, 2008
27	2	"All Warfare Is Based on Deception"; Transliteration: "Hei to wa Kidō nari" (Japanese: 兵とは詭道なり)	June 18, 2008
28	3	"Nor Can the Dead Be Brought Back to Life"; Transliteration: "Shisha wa Fukuta Ikube Karazu" (Japanese: 死者は復た生くべからず)	June 25, 2008
29	4	"Regard Soldiers as Your Children"; Transliteration: "Sotsu o Miru Koto Eiji no Gotoshi" (Japanese: 卒を視ること嬰児のごとし)	July 2, 2008
30	5	"Do Not Fight Unless It Is Critical"; Transliteration: "Ayauki ni Arazareba Tatakawazu" (Japanese: 危うきに非ざれば戦わず)	July 9, 2008
31	6	"Intelligence Makes Great Spies"; Transliteration: "Jōchi o Motte Kanja to Nasu" (Japanese: 上智を以て間者と為す)	July 16, 2008
32	7	"At First, Like a Virgin"; Transliteration: "Hajime wa Shojo no Gotoku" (Japanese: 始めは処女の如く)	July 23, 2008
33	8	"Do Unto Others, Do Not Let Them Do Unto You"; Transliteration: "Hito o Itashite Hito ni Itasarezu" (Japanese: 人を致して人に致されず)	July 30, 2008
34	9	"The Bigger Odds Wins, the Smaller Odds Loses"; Transliteration: "San Ōki wa Kachi, San Sukunaki wa Katazu" (Japanese: 算多きは勝ち、算少なきは勝たず)	August 6, 2008
35	10	"Strike the Enemy's Plan"; Transliteration: "Jōhei wa Hakarigoto o Utsu" (Japanese: 上兵は謀を伐つ)	August 13, 2008
36	11	"Start by Taking Away the Ones They Love"; Transliteration: "Mazu Sono Aisuru Tokoro o Ubau" (Japanese: 先ずその愛する所を奪う)	August 20, 2008
37	12	"Coming Together"; Transliteration: "Atsumari te Ichi to Naru" (Japanese: 専まりて一と為る)	August 27, 2008

=== Ikki Tousen: Xtreme Xecutor (2010) ===
No. overall	No. in season	Title	Original release date
38	1	"Wet Fighter"; Transliteration: "Nureru Tōshi" (Japanese: 濡れる闘士)	March 26, 2010
39	2	"Gathering Allies"; Transliteration: "Tsudō Nakama" (Japanese: 集う仲間)	April 2, 2010
40	3	"Lion in Training"; Transliteration: "Kitaeru Shishi" (Japanese: 鍛える獅子)	April 9, 2010
41	4	"The Devil Beckons"; Transliteration: "Maneku Akuma" (Japanese: 招く悪魔)	April 16, 2010
42	5	"Bonds of the Soul"; Transliteration: "Tamashii no Kizuna" (Japanese: 魂の絆)	April 23, 2010
43	6	"Swarming Fangs"; Transliteration: "Muragaru Kiba" (Japanese: 群がる牙)	April 30, 2010
44	7	"Silent Tears"; Transliteration: "Chinmoku no Namida" (Japanese: 沈黙の涙)	May 7, 2010
45	8	"Reunion of the Fists"; Transliteration: "Saikai ha Kobushi" (Japanese: 再会は拳)	May 14, 2010
46	9	"Angry Love"; Transliteration: "Ikaru Ai" (Japanese: 怒る愛)	May 21, 2010
47	10	"Shredded Darkness"; Transliteration: "Sakareta Yami" (Japanese: 裂かれた闇)	May 28, 2010
48	11	"Fiery Castle"; Transliteration: "Moeru Shiro" (Japanese: 燃える城)	June 4, 2010
49	12	"Future: Unlimited"; Transliteration: "Mirai Mugen" (Japanese: 未来無限)	June 11, 2010

=== Shin Ikki Tousen (2022) ===
No. overall	No. in season	Title	Original release date
50	1	"The Return"; Transliteration: "Kikan" (Japanese: 帰還)	May 17, 2022
51	2	"Jofukuin"; Transliteration: "Jofukuin" (Japanese: 徐福院)	May 24, 2022
52	3	"Melody"; Transliteration: "Senritsu" (Japanese: 旋律)	May 31, 2022

== OVAs ==
=== Ikki Tousen: Shugaku Toshi Keppu-roku (2011) ===
No.	Title	Original release date
1	"Ikki Tousen: Shūgaku Tōshi Keppu-roku" (Japanese: 一騎当千 集鍔闘士血風録)	November 12, 2011

=== Ikki Tousen: Extravaganza Epoch (2014) ===
No.	Title	Original release date
1	"Encounter"; Transliteration: "Episode: Encounter" (Japanese: Episode: Encounter)	December 21, 2014
2	"Exchange"; Transliteration: "Episode: Exchange" (Japanese: Episode: Exchange)	December 28, 2014

=== Ikki Tousen: Western Wolves (2019) ===
No.	Title	Original release date
1	"Soukouroshuku"; Transliteration: "Sōkōroshuku" (Japanese: 草行露宿)	January 3, 2019
2	"Ametsuyu Sousetsu"; Transliteration: "Ametsuyu Sōsetsu" (Japanese: 雨露霜雪)	February 3, 2019
3	"Futoufukutsu"; Transliteration: "Futōfukutsu" (Japanese: 不撓不屈)	February 27, 2019
