= Ikki Tousen season 1 =

Ikki Tousen
- Season 1
- Cover of the Ikki Tousen Season 1 DVD box set released by Media Factory on January 25, 2008
- No. of episodes: 13

Release
- Original network: AT-X, TVK, Mie TV, Chiba TV, TV Saitama, Sun Television
- Original release: July 20 – October 22, 2003

Season chronology
- Next → Ikki Tousen: Dragon Destiny

Ikki Tousen is an anime television series based on the manga by Yuji Shiozaki, published by Wani Books and serialized in the seinen manga magazine Comic GUM. The anime is produced by J.C.Staff, directed by Takashi Watanabe, series composition by Takao Yoshioka, music by Hiroshi Motokura and Project IKKI, characters by Shinya Hasegawa, and produced by Nobuhiro Osawa and Yuji Matsukura. The series aired 13 episodes on AT-X from July 30 to October 22, 2003, with subsequent runs on TVK, Mie TV, Chiba TV, TV Saitama, and Sun Television. The opening theme is "Drivin' Through The Night" by M.o.v.e while the two ending themes are "Let me be with you" by Shela for episodes 1–7, and Fate by Masumi Asano for episodes 8–13. The series was licensed in North America by Geneon Entertainment and Enoki Films. Funimation Entertainment now licenses the series. The series is also licensed in Australia and New Zealand by Madman Entertainment and in the United Kingdom by MVM Films.

== Episode list ==
No.	Translated title/Funimation's dub title (Note: Titles in this season were listed as numbers. The Funimation dub has a different title.)	Original release date
1	"One" / "The Champions"; Transliteration: "Ichi" (Japanese: 壱)	July 30, 2003
2	"Two" / "Confrontation with the Big Four of Nanyo High!"; Transliteration: "Ni" (Japanese: 弐)	August 6, 2003
3	"Three" / "My Virtue is in Danger!"; Transliteration: "San" (Japanese: 参)	August 13, 2003
4	"Four" / "A Duel! Taishiji vs. Sonsaku"; Transliteration: "Yon" (Japanese: 四)	August 20, 2003
5	"Five" / "Get Angry, Hakufu! The School of Counterattack!"; Transliteration: "Go" (Japanese: 伍)	August 27, 2003
6	"Six" / "The Bloody Big Fighters Tournament!"; Transliteration: "Roku" (Japanese: 六)	September 3, 2003
7	"Seven" / "The Fatal Confrontation!"; Transliteration: "Nana" (Japanese: 七)	September 10, 2003
8	"Eight" / "Goei's Betrayal! Why?"; Transliteration: "Hachi" (Japanese: 八)	September 17, 2003
9	"Nine" / "Viva La Hot Spring!"; Transliteration: "Kyuu" (Japanese: 九)	September 24, 2003
10	"Ten" / "The Sho Haou Encounters the Devil!"; Transliteration: "Jitsu" (Japanese: 拾)	October 1, 2003
11	"Eleven" / "Ryofu, Her Love and Death!"; Transliteration: "Jitsu Ichi" (Japanese: 拾壱)	October 8, 2003
12	"Twelve" / "Summer Comes to a Watermelon Field"; Transliteration: "Jitsu Ni" (Japanese: 拾弐)	October 15, 2003
13	"Thirteen" / "Good-bye Hakufu! The Battle Days!"; Transliteration: "Jitsu San" (Japanese: 拾参)	October 22, 2003

== Home Media release ==
=== Japanese ===
Seven DVD volumes were released by Media Factory between November 22, 2003, and May 25, 2004. A DVD box set was later released on January 25, 2008, and a Blu-ray box set was released on April 27, 2011.

=== English ===
Geneon Entertainment and Enoki Films released the series on four DVD volumes between August 10, 2004, and March 1, 2005. A box set was later released on July 19, 2005, by Geneon.

Funimation Entertainment released a box set of the series on May 26, 2009.
