= List of Ikki Tousen chapters =

Ikki Tousen is a Japanese manga series written and illustrated by Yuji Shiozaki. Based on the Chinese novel Romance of the Three Kingdoms, the story's plot focuses on an all-out turf war in the Kanto region of Japan, where seven rival schools—Nanyo Academy, Kyosho Academy, Seito Academy, Yoshu Academy, Rakuyo High School, Gogun High School, and Yoshu Private School—fight each other for territorial supremacy. The series' main protagonist is Hakufu Sonsaku who is the descendant of the legendary warrior Sun Ce. Hakufu transfers to Nanyo Academy under her mother's orders. The characters in the series are in fact Japanese readings of the characters involved in Romance of the Three Kingdoms.

Ikki Tousen began monthly serialization in the seinen manga magazine Comic GUM by Wani Books. The first tankōbon was released in October 2000, with a total of 24 volumes available in Japan as of September 25, 2015. The manga was licensed in North America and the United Kingdom by Tokyopop under the title of Battle Vixens, and sold fifteen volumes between April 6, 2004, and April 27, 2010. The manga is also licensed in Australia and New Zealand by Madman Entertainment, in France by Panini Comics, in Argentina and Spain by Editorial Ivrea, in Germany by Carlsen Comics (under the title of "Dragon Girls"), and in China by Sharp Point Press.

A 13-episode anime adaptation of Ikki Tousen produced by J.C. Staff and directed by Takashi Watanabe aired on AT-X between July 30 and October 22, 2003. So far, there are five seasons produced.

== Volume list ==
No.	Title	Original release date	English release date
01	Violent Femme	October 2000; 978-4-8470-3329-2	April 6, 2004; 978-1-59182-743-6
Chapter 1; Chapter 2; Chapter 3; Chapter 4; Chapter 0 (Prequel Chapter / One Shot)
02	Wild Things!	April 2001; 978-4-8470-3396-4	June 8, 2004; 978-1-59182-744-3
Chapter 5; Chapter 6; Chapter 7; Chapter 8; Chapter 9; Chapter 10
03	Battle Blues	October 2001; 978-4-8470-3414-5	August 10, 2004; 978-1-59182-745-0
Chapter 11; Chapter 12; Chapter 13; Chapter 14; Chapter 15; Chapter 16; Chapter 17; Chapter 18
04	Unbreakable	April 2002; 978-4-8470-3429-9	October 5, 2004; 978-1-59182-746-7
Chapter 19; Chapter 20; Chapter 21; Chapter 22; Chapter 23; Chapter 24
05	Sleeping Dragons	November 2002; 978-4-8470-3388-9	December 7, 2004; 978-1-59182-947-8
Chapter 25; Chapter 26; Chapter 27; Chapter 28; Chapter 29; Chapter 30; Chapter 31; Ikki Tousen Special - Part I; Ikki Tousen Special - Part II
06	Girl on Girl	August 23, 2003; 978-4-8470-3452-7	February 8, 2005; 978-1-59182-948-5
Chapter 32; Chapter 33; Chapter 34; Chapter 35; Chapter 36; Chapter 37; Chapter 38; Chapter 39; Anime Special
07	Let Sleeping Dragons Lie	March 25, 2004; 978-4-8470-3465-7	May 10, 2005; 978-1-59532-602-7
Chapter 40; Chapter 41; Chapter 42; Chapter 43; Chapter 44; Chapter 45; Chapter 46; Chapter 47
08	Toilet Brush With Death	December 25, 2004; 978-4-8470-3482-4	September 13, 2005; 978-1-59532-902-8
Chapter 48; Chapter 49; Chapter 50; Chapter 51; Chapter 52; Chapter 53; Chapter 54; Gallery of Chapter Covers (from 24 - 54)
09	Shafted	May 25, 2005; 978-4-8470-3502-9	September 13, 2006; 978-1-59816-686-6
Chapter 55; Chapter 56; Chapter 57; Chapter 58; Chapter 59; Chapter 60; Chapter 61; Four Panels Extra
10	Battle Vixens	December 24, 2005; 978-4-8470-3530-2	January 11, 2007; 978-1-59816-866-2
Chapter 62; Chapter 63; Chapter 64; Chapter 65; Chapter 66; Chapter 67; Chapter 68
11	Exposed	May 25, 2006; 978-4-8470-3548-7	April 10, 2007; 978-1-4278-0131-9
Chapter 69; Chapter 70; Chapter 71; Chapter 72; Chapter 73; Chapter 74; Four Panels Extra I; Four Panels Extra II; Gallery of Chapter Covers (from 55 - 74)
12	Penetrated	January 9, 2007; 978-4-8470-3586-9	August 14, 2007; 978-1-4278-0451-8
Chapter 75; Chapter 76; Chapter 77; Chapter 78; Chapter 79; Chapter 80; Chapter 81
13	Fisted	September 25, 2007; 978-4-8470-3610-1	June 17, 2008; 978-1-4278-1238-4
Chapter 82; Chapter 83; Chapter 84; Chapter 85; Chapter 86; Chapter 87; Chapter 88; Extra: Shinryuseki
14	A Tight Squeeze	July 24, 2008; 978-4-8470-3645-3	February 10, 2009; 978-1-4278-1595-8
Chapter 89; Chapter 90; Chapter 91; Chapter 92; Chapter 93; Chapter 94; Chapter 95; Extra I; Extra II
15	A New Truth	March 25, 2009; 978-4-8470-3675-0	April 27, 2010; 978-1-4278-1758-7
Chapter 96; Chapter 97; Chapter 98; Chapter 99; Chapter 100; Chapter 101; Chapter 102; Extra: Shinkanseki; Gallery of Chapter Covers (75 - 102)
16	—	September 18, 2009; 978-4-8470-3698-9	—
Chapter 103; Chapter 104; Chapter 105; Chapter 106; Chapter 107; Chapter 108; Chapter 109; Extra: Chohi Ekitoku's everyday struggles
17	—	June 25, 2010; 978-4-8470-3726-9	—
Chapter 110; Chapter 111; Chapter 112; Chapter 113; Chapter 114; Chapter 115; Chapter 116; Chapter 117; Extra: Kyocho Chuko in her free time
18	—	March 25, 2011; 978-4-8470-3764-1	—
Chapter 118; Chapter 119; Chapter 120; Chapter 121; Chapter 122; Chapter 123; Chapter 124; Extra: Chou'un Shiryu lost her sword!; Extra: Shokatsu Kinshiyu's training session; Extra: Kan'u Unchou's unsatisfied dream fantasies
19	—	February 25, 2012; 978-4-8470-3802-0	—
Chapter 125; Chapter 126; Chapter 127; Chapter 128; Chapter 129; Chapter 130; Extra: The past of Chou'un Shiryu: Zanryu is forged!; Extra: Seito goes to the beach; Extra: Volleyball match: Seito vs. Nanyo; Gallery of Chapter Covers (102 - 123)
20	—	September 26, 2012; 978-4-8470-3828-0	—
Chapter 131; Chapter 132; Chapter 133; Chapter 134; Chapter 135; Chapter 136; Chapter 137; Chapter 138; Extra: Seito goes Rock'n'Roll; Extra: Kyocho Chuko and Soso Motoku
21	—	March 24, 2013; 978-4-8470-3860-0	—
Chapter 139; Chapter 140; Chapter 141; Chapter 142; Chapter 143; Chapter 144; Extra: Sojin Shiko and the secret of big breasts; Character states: Sonsaku Hakufu; Chou'un Shiryu; Yagyu Mitsuyshi; Chohi Ekitoku; Hozoin Inshun; Ryubi Gentoku; Kan'u Unchou; Sojin Shoki; Kyocho Chuko; Character Popularity Poll (1st Kan'u Unchou, 2nd Ryomou Shimei, 3rd Sonsaku Hakufu); Best Fights Poll
22	—	January 26, 2014; 978-4-8470-3902-7	—
Chapter 145; Chapter 146; Chapter 147; Chapter 148; Chapter 149; Chapter 150; Chapter 151; Extra: Mo-chan's daily routine; Extra: Sojin Shoki and Soso Motoku's first encounter
23	—	November 27, 2014; 978-4-8470-3943-0	—
Chapter 152; Chapter 153; Chapter 154; Chapter 155; Chapter 156; Chapter 157; Chapter 158; Chapter 159; Extra: Sonsaku Hakufu's studying session; Extra: Ikki Tousen High School; Extra: Goei's Strip Battle: Ryomo Shimei vs. Kan'u Uncho
24	—	September 25, 2015; 978-4-8470-3969-0	—
Chapter 160; Chapter 161; Chapter 162; Chapter 163; Chapter 164; Chapter 165; Chapter 166; Extra: Master strategist, Koumei Shokatsuryou; Gallery of Chapter Covers (128 - 166)
