= List of Ah My Buddha episodes =

The episodes of the Ah My Buddha and Amaenaideyo!! Katsu!! anime are based on the manga of the same name written by Toshinori Sogabe and Bohemian K. Both anime series are directed by Keitaro Motonaga and produced by Studio Deen, AT-X and VAP. The plot of the episodes follows the adventures of a teenage monk named Ikko Satonaka. He lives in a temple with six nuns, each representing one of the bosatsu of the six lower realms of the traditional Buddhist cosmology.

Ah My Buddha was broadcast on AT-X between July 1, 2005, and September 16, 2005. It is licensed by in North America by Media Blasters as Ah My Buddha. It is also licensed in Taiwan by Top-Insight International. Ah My Buddha uses two pieces of theme music. "Afurete yuku no wa kono kimochi" (あふれてゆくのはこの気持ち) by Amae-tai! is the series' opening theme, while "Happy Days" by Mai Nakahara is the series' ending theme. Five DVDs, containing the 12 episodes plus an original video animation, was released by VAP between August 24, 2005, and December 21, 2005.

On January 29, 2009, Media Blasters released the first DVD, called Amaenaideyo!! - The Aroused One, which contained the first four episodes of the anime. On March 17, 2009, Media Blasters released the second DVD, called Amaenaideyo!! - The Two Uncovered Paths, which contained the fifth to eighth episodes of the anime.

Amaenaideyo!! Katsu!! was broadcast on AT-X between January 4, 2006, and March 22, 2006. It is also licensed in Taiwan by Top-Insight International. Amaenaideyo!! Katsu!! uses two pieces of theme music. "Amaenaideyotsu!!" (あまえないでよっ!!) by Amae-tai! is the series' opening theme, while "Lonesome Traveler" by Mai Nakahara is the series' ending theme. Five DVDs, containing the 12 episodes plus an original video animation, was released by VAP between February 22, 2006, and June 21, 2006.

== Ah My Buddha ==
No.	Title	Original release date
1	"Don't Awaken!!"; Transliteration: "Ikasenaide yo!!" (Japanese: 覚醒(い)かせないでよっ!!)	July 1, 2005
Ikkou Satonaka awakens to exorcise a ghost in the temple. Jotoku Kawahara punishes him for needing to awaken. Chitose Nanbu ignores him for seeing her naked. Later, a doll begins to haunt a doll memorial service, and Chitose exposes herself to Ikkou so that he can awaken.
2	"Don't Fool Around!!"; Transliteration: "Asobanaide yo!!" (Japanese: 夜遊(あそ)ばないでよっ!!)	July 8, 2005
Ikkou and Chitose clean the temple while the rest of the gang is doing high school club activities. Ikkou and Chitose sneaks into town at night to go to karaoke together. They later go to an arcade to get their photo taken. As they try to leave, earthbound spirits stop them. Chitose gives them a sermon and they are exorcised. When Ikkou and Chitose meet Jotoku and the gang, Jotoku punishes Ikkou for disappearing from the temple.
3	"Don't Peek!!"; Transliteration: "Nozokanaide yo!!" (Japanese: 覗かないでよっ!!)	July 15, 2005
After a swim class, the girls find that only bras and underwear of large sizes are taken from the locker room. Ikkou is the prime suspect is relentlessly question by the girls. A friend of Ikkou, Yagani, reveals his feelings for Sumi Ikuina, wanting Ikkou to help him make Sumi instantly love him. The underwear thief is revealed to be a spirit and Jotoku orders the gang to exorcise the spirit after school. The spirit is actually Yagani and is exorcised after Ikkou awakens.
4	"Don't Be Frightened!!"; Transliteration: "Obienaide yo!!" (Japanese: 怯えないでよっ!!)	July 22, 2005
Chitose's love for horror films is shown when she forces Ikkou, Sumi, Yuuko Atoda, and Hinata Sugai to watch them with her. A little girl requests help from the gang and they enter a haunted house. Chitose narrates the scenarios that occurred in the respective rooms and scares the wits out of Ikkou, Sumi, and Yuuko. It is revealed that the little girl is a spirit, and Jotoku punishes them for not realizing that sooner.
5	"Don't Cosplay!!"; Transliteration: "Kosuranaide yo!!" (Japanese: コスらないでよっ!!)	July 29, 2005
The classes of Chitose and Sakura Sugai compete with each others in a food selling contest in an annual festival. The winner will receive food tickets for a year. During the festival, a spirit, who frequents Sakura's homepage, sees her at school. Sakura takes him to go to all the booths in the festival. After the festival, the spirit is able to rest in peace and disappears.
6	"Don't Transform!!"; Transliteration: "Kawaranaide yo!!" (Japanese: 変身(か)わらないでよっ!!)	August 5, 2005
Ikkou, Chitose, and Haruka Amanogawa go to a department store where there has been a restless spirit. They find a Super Sentai team that cannot rest until they perform one last time. After performing for Ikkou, Chitose, and Haruka, one of them does not dissipate. It is up to the three to exorcise him.
7	"Don't Look for Me!!"; Transliteration: "Sagasanaide yo!!" (Japanese: 探さないでよっ!!)	August 12, 2005
Master Devil, Hinata's fire-spitting demon pet, tries to jump from a bridge and kill himself, because Hinata only paid attention to a new kitten she rescued from dangerous dogs. Ikkou and Hinata manages to convince Master Devil not to jump. The kitten was turned into a demon by two mysterious men. Hinata tries to awaken Ikkou by stripping herself, which fails. The rest of the gang arrives and Master Devil strips them of their clothing to awaken Ikkou to exorcise the demon in the kitten. The kitten is given away and Hinata's relationship with Master Devil has been improved.
8	"Don't Confess!!"; Transliteration: "Kokuranaide yo!!" (Japanese: 告白(コク)らないでよっ!!)	August 19, 2005
Yuuko receives a love letter from a boy and tries to hide it from the others. The rest of the gang are suspicious Sakura guesses correctly that she received a love letter. Yuuko gets a free sample of makeup and tries to use it with disastrous results. Haruka puts the makeup on Yuuko for her. The next day, Yuuko's classmates notice her cute side. After an encounter with Ikkou, she decides to reject the boy and continue living in her tomboyish ways.
9	"Don't Sing!!"; Transliteration: "Utawanaide yo!!" (Japanese: 歌わないでよっ!!)	August 26, 2005
Ayako is the ghost haunting a recording studio. Her creepy voice has been recorded into some albums, and the studio request help from Ikkou and Chitose. Ayako said she died in a car crash before she made her debut album so she became a restless ghost. Ikkou tells Chitose to lend Ayako her body to sing. With the cooperation of the studio, the album of Ayako through Chitose was ranked first, and Chitose is invited to sing publicly. On the stage however, Ayako refuses to pass on because she has not sung it to her love interest. Jotoku brings her boyfriend to the stage and Ayako is able to pass on in the afterlife.
10	"Don't Get Me Wet!!"; Transliteration: "Nurasanaide yo!!" (Japanese: 濡らさないでよっ!!)	September 2, 2005
Jotoku sends Ikkou, Chitose, Yuuko, Sumi, and Hinata in the mountains, in order to help an old monk clean his temple, yet they are only persuaded by the hot springs at that temple. After arriving, the five are given arduous chores to do in temple, and they later enjoy a bath in the hot springs. Sumi and Hinata notice a spirit watching them. It is revealed that the spirit is controlled by two rogue monks, who are against Jotoku and want to use Ikkou's awakened power. Chitose prevents Ikkou from awakening while Sumi and Hinata successfully exorcise the spirit.
11	"Don't Irritate Me!!"; Transliteration: "Jirasanaide yo!!" (Japanese: 焦らさないでよっ!!)	September 9, 2005
Ikkou tries to exorcise a spider spirit without awakening but fails. Later, the gang is assigned by Jotoku to exorcise Santa Claus on Christmas due to a train accident forty-five years ago. Sakura's recantation of the sūtra does not exorcise Santa and is forced to allow Ikkou to awaken. The gang eats cake afterwards.
12	"Don't Awaken!!"; Transliteration: "Mezamenaide yo!!" (Japanese: 覚醒(めざ)めないでよっ!!)	September 16, 2005
Chitose is determined to keep Ikkou from needing to awaken to exorcise. Ikkou is chosen to perform the joya no kane, ringing of the bell one hundred eight times at New Year's Eve to negate the one hundred eight human desires. The other are deal with the visitors. An excessively large amount of spirits gather during the ringing of the bell, and Ikkou faints as he strikes the bell the last time. Chitose volunteers to protect Ikkou but is nearly raped. Ikkou wakes up and comes to Chitose's rescue, using the power of the holy priest to exorcise all the spirits gathered without awakening. He faints again afterwards.
13 (OVA)	"Don't Take a Break!!"; Transliteration: "Yasumanaide yo!!" (Japanese: 休まないでよっ!!)	DVD Release
The gang travels to an old hotel, after winning a television game show. A recap of the rest of the season as well as the introducing the girls and the respective bosatsu of the six realms of the traditional Buddhist cosmology they represent. The girls drink alcohol, and Ikkou becomes the victims of what the girls do while they are asleep.

== Amaenaideyo!! Katsu!! ==
No.	Title	Original release date
1	"Don't Tempt Me!!"; Transliteration: "Sasowanaide yo!!" (Japanese: 誘惑(さそ)わないでよっ!!)	January 4, 2006
Ikkou Satonaka and Chitose Nanbu are tasked with helping the Toudou family. There, Ikkou meets Kazuki Kazusano, a special monk from a rival temple. They try to exorcise the spirits together but create embarrassing situations for themselves. Later, when Ikkou and Kazuki are alone, she tries to awaken him to the right path.
2	"Don't Fan Me!!"; Transliteration: "Aoganaide yo!!" (Japanese: 扇がないでよっ!!)	January 11, 2006
Ikkou, Chitose, Yuuko Atoda, and Sumi Ikuina are now second-year students. Haruka Amanogawa and Sakura Sugai become third-year students, with Sakura being the new school council president. Hinata Sugai enters as a first-year student. Hinata received a charm from each of the other girls for the school entrance ceremony. At the ceremony, Kazuki represents the first-year students and makes a speech. During her speech, the spirit of the school council founder creates strong winds to lift up all the female students skirts. He is subdued by all of the nuns, excluding Hinata. However, Kazuki releases him and forces Ikkou to awaken to exorcise him.
3	"Don't Come Back!!"; Transliteration: "Modoranaide yo!!" (Japanese: 復活(もど)らないでよっ!!)	January 18, 2006
Ikkou's ghost friend, Yagani, proclaims his love for Kazuki because he likes the feeling of being exorcise by her. However, Kazuki rejects his advances. She challenges Chitose at the school's annual athletics carnival for Ikkou. After a backfired sabotage attempt by Kazuki, she lock herself up in the gym equipment room with Ikkou.
4	"Don't Haniwa!!"; Transliteration: "Haniwanaide yo!!" (Japanese: ハニワないでよっ!!)	January 25, 2006
Ikkou, Chitose, Hinata, Sakura, and Kazuki go on a haniwa excavation together. Kazuki shamelessly seduces Ikkou but is constantly thwarted by her fanboys. In a rage, Kazuki accidentally releases an evil spirit, that of a giant haniwa. Hinata is forced to make Master Devil, her little fire-spitting-demon pet, into a monster to destroy the spirit.
5	"Don't Fall!!"; Transliteration: "Ochinaide yo!!" (Japanese: 堕ちないでよっ!!)	February 1, 2006
Jotoku Kawahara send Ikkou and Hinata to Saichouji in order to meet Miyako Amanogawa to allow Hinata to overcome her bosatsu, the demon realm. Chitose, Yuuko and Sakura follow them to the temple only to be found out by Miyako, thus being sent back to Saienji. Hinata succeeds in suppressing Ikkou after he has awakened to Miyako's dirty play.
6	"Don't Be Perplexed!!"; Transliteration: "Mayowanaide yo!!" (Japanese: 迷わないでよっ!!)	February 8, 2006
After a week of training at Saichouji, Ikkou and Hinata are required to go into Danda Cave, one of the few places close to the underworld, to complete Hinata's training. Hinata manages to relinquish her ties to her demon associates, with exception of Master Devil, for her sister's love. Worried about Hinata and Ikkou, the rest of the gang go to Saichouji to meet them. When Jotoku finds out that the girls have abandoned their chores, she gets Miyako to assign them chores, namely shell-diving in see-through. It is revealed that Miyako is the older sister of Haruka.
7	"Don't Be In Heat!!"; Transliteration: "Sakaranaide yo!!" (Japanese: サカらないでよっ!!)	February 15, 2006
Cats and dogs are attracted to Sumi's bosatsu, the animal realm. Sumi is locked in the temple while the rest of the gang patrol the temple at night. Kazuki finds out about the situation and joins the patrol to seduce Ikkou. Inspired by Ikkou resisting awakening by Kazuki's seduction, Sumi recites the sutra and manages to calm the cats and dogs down.
8	"Don't Egg!!"; Transliteration: "Tamaranaide yo!!" (Japanese: 玉子(タマ)らないでよっ!!)	February 22, 2006
After a fight with a local gang, which uses Ikkou as hostage, Chitose, Yuuko, and Sumi visit Ikkou in the hospital. They see a little boy refusing to do surgery because of the absence of his mother. Empathizing for the little boy, Yuuko promises to make the little boy a delicious dish so that he can do surgery. They first try nikujaga, a Japanese dish made predominantly of meat and potatoes. After many failed tries they switch to sunnyside up fried eggs. Yuuko manages to make it on her last try and the little boy approves of the end product.
9	"Don't Cry!!"; Transliteration: "Nakanaide yo!!" (Japanese: 泣かないでよっ!!)	March 1, 2006
A baby boy is left abandoned at the gate of Saienji. The gang plus Kazuki attempt to pacify the baby in Jotoku's absence. Kazuki uses the pretext of calming the baby to seduce Ikkou. Haruka, who has a natural talent for calming the baby, is reminded of Miyako looking after her in the past. The mother drops by to retrieve her baby son, as Jotoku returns to find out the situation.
10	"Don't Meddle!!"; Transliteration: "Ijiranaide yo!!" (Japanese: いじらないでよっ!!)	March 8, 2006
Kazuki's two subordinates helps Kazuki to seduce Ikkou under different guises. When most of them are foiled by Chitose, Kazuki confronts her and questions her feelings for Ikkou.
11	"Don't Act Spoiled!!"; Transliteration: "Amaenaide yo!!" (Japanese: あまえないでよっ!!)	March 15, 2006
One of Kazuki's subordinates, a vengeful ghost, creates chaos in Japan with flying zombies. The girls attempt to exorcise the zombies by themselves but the task proves too hard. They find Ikkou ballgagged, bound with bondage restraints by Jotoku for dismally failing all his subjects at school. Ikkou awakens and successfully exorcises all the spirit but faints afterwards. Kazuki's jealousy is tangible when she sees Ikkou and Chitose together.
12	"Don't End!!"; Transliteration: "Owaranaide yo!!" (Japanese: 終わらないでよっ!!)	March 22, 2006
Kazuki explains that all the times she seduced Ikkou was because of her empathy of Ikkou being sent to a temple at an early age. She over-awakens Ikkou and is consequently disappears into his soul. The awakening causes residents of Tokyo to become frenzied zombies and an unprecedented amount of spirits to appear. The gang and Jotoku exorcise the spirits and Chitose manages to stop Ikkou in his awakened state. Kazuki is released and promises to redo her training.
13 (OVA)	"Don't Be Fooled!!"; Transliteration: "Damasarenaide yo!!" (Japanese: ダマされないでよっ!!)	DVD Release
Under the pretext of filming themselves, the Amaenaideyo gang with Jotoku and Kazuki do a "behind-the-scenes" act at a movie studio to exorcise a ghost. It appears the ghost is not by herself. There is a montage of erotic scenes from throughout the series just before the credits.
