= Mekuri Mekuru =

Japanese manga series

- First tankōbon volume cover

めくりめくる
- Manga
- Written by: Taku
- Published by: Wani Books
- Imprint: Gum Comics Plus
- Magazine: Comic Gum
- Original run: March 26, 2010 – June 26, 2014
- Volumes: 6

Mekuri Mekuru (めくりめくる) is a Japanese manga series written and illustrated by Taku. It was serialized in Wani Books' seinen manga magazine Comic Gum from March 2010 to June 2014.

== Publication ==
Written and illustrated by Taku, Mekuri Mekuru was serialized in Wani Books' seinen manga magazine Comic Gum from March 26, 2010, to June 26, 2014. The series' chapters were collected into six tankōbon volumes from October 25, 2010, to August 25, 2014.

No.	Release date	ISBN
1	October 25, 2010	978-4-84-703932-4
2	June 25, 2011	978-4-84-703776-4
3	March 24, 2012	978-4-84-703804-4
4	December 25, 2012	978-4-84-703834-1
5	November 25, 2013	978-4-84-703894-5
6	August 25, 2014	978-4-84-703932-4
