= Koe de Oshigoto! =

Japanese manga series

- Koe de Oshigot
- Volume 1 cover, featuring Kanna Aoyagi

こえでおしごと!
- Genre: Comedy, Romance
- Manga
- Written by: Azure Konno
- Published by: Wani Books
- English publisher: NA: Manga Planet
- Magazine: Comic Gum
- Original run: May 26, 2008 – April 26, 2013
- Volumes: 10
- Original video animation

Koe de Oshigoto! The Animation
- Directed by: Naoto Hosoda
- Written by: Masashi Suzuki
- Music by: YM-FACTORY
- Studio: Studio Gokumi
- Licensed by: NA: Media Blasters
- Released: November 17, 2010 – May 11, 2011
- Runtime: 30 minutes
- Episodes: 2
- Manga

Koe de Oshigoto!!
- Written by: Azure Konno
- Published by: Futabasha
- Magazine: Monthly Action
- Original run: May 24, 2020 – November 24, 2021
- Volumes: 2
- icon

Koe de Oshigoto! (こえでおしごと!; "working with voice"), also known by the short title KoeGoto (こえごと), is a Japanese manga series written and illustrated by Azure Konno, about a girl working as a voice actress for an eroge development company. It was serialized in Wani Books' monthly Comic Gum magazine from 2008 to 2013. A two-episode anime adaptation was produced by Studio Gokumi and released in 2010 and 2011. A sequel manga series titled Koe de Oshigoto!! began serialization in Futabasha's Monthly Action magazine in May 2020.

== Plot ==
Koe de Oshigoto! is a story about Kanna Aoyagi, a sixteen-year-old girl who was asked to become a voice actress for eroge by her older sister on Kanna's sixteenth birthday. Kanna does not want to become a voice actress at first, but after she thinks about all of the things her sister did for her when she was growing up, and knowing that she owes her, she finally agrees.

However, Kanna is still very nervous about being a voice actress for such games. As the story progresses, she becomes more and more comfortable with the requirements of the job. She is helped along by both her coworkers and a classmate who also does work on eroge in his spare time.

== Characters ==
Kanna Aoyagi (青柳 柑奈, Aoyagi Kanna)
Voiced by: Mako (OVA), Miku Nishino (Drama CD)
A first year student of Takashima Minami High School. On her 16th birthday, Kanna was asked by her sister, Yayoi, to come to her workplace after school. Once she arrived, Kanna found out that it's an eroge company and was asked to be a voice actress for a game they are developing. She is good with sports and a person great of imagination and concentration to the point where she can have an orgasm with only her imagination. Kanna's work job is kept secret under the pseudonym Aoi Kanna.

Yayoi Aoyagi (青柳 弥生, Aoyagi Yayoi)
Voiced by: Akeno Watanabe (OVA), Hyosei (Drama CD)
Kanna's 28-year-old elder sister and a "EROGEMEKA" for the eroge company, Blue March. Yayoi cares greatly and always buys presents for Kanna on her birthday. She speaks very bluntly and is not at all embarrassed by her work on eroge.

Fumika Warasono (藁園 文花, Warasono Fumika)
Voiced by: Ayano Ishikawa (OVA), Kizuna Aihara (Drama CD)
A college student and professional eroge voice actress. Kanna looks up to her as a voice acting role model, and Fumika seem to be the only one who sympathizes with Kanna's embarrassment as a voice actress for eroge. Although she is a professional as an eroge voice actress, Fumika has no experience in real life.

Nagatoshi Hioki (日置 長俊, Hioki Nagatoshi)
Voiced by: Susumu Chiba (OVA), Wasshoi Taro (Drama CD)
The scenario writer for the eroge company, Blue March. He is an older acquaintance of Yayoi and Kanna. He started as someone who loved to read, but after reading some eroge scripts, he began writing them himself. Kanna really respects Nagatoshi and treats him as an older brother.

Kotori Makino (牧野 ことり, Makino Kotori)
Voiced by: Maina Shimagata
Kanna's twintailed best friend. She talks in a soft spoken tone.

Hazuki Noge (野毛 葉月, Noge Hazuki)
Voiced by: Juri Nagatsuma
Kanna's other friend from school. She has wavy blonde hair.

Motoki Kaizu (海津 本木, Kaizu Motoki)
Voiced by: Sayaka Hirao
Kanna's male classmate and her main love interest. He is the son of the president of the game company.

== Media ==
=== Manga ===
The manga series Koe de Oshigoto! was written and illustrated by Azure Konno and published by Wani Books. The series was serialized in the Comic Gum magazine, starting in the July 2008 issue, released on May 26, 2008, and ending in the June 2013 issue on April 26, 2013. Wani Books have published it in ten compiled volumes under the imprint Gum Comics Plus between December 23, 2008 and July 25, 2013. The manga is licensed digitally in English by Manga Planet.

A sequel manga titled Koe de Oshigoto!! began serialization in Futabasha's Monthly Action magazine on May 24, 2020. Two compiled volumes were released as of June 2021. The manga will end serialization on November 24, 2021.

=== Anime ===
A two-episode anime adaptation titled Koe de Oshigoto! The Animation (こえでおしごと! The ANIMATION) was produced by Studio Gokumi and produced by Pony Canyon It was directed by Naoto Hosoda, produced by Yuichiro Takahata, with scripts by Masashi Suzuki and character design by Satoru Kiyomaru. The two episodes were released on Blu-ray Disc and DVD, with the first on November 17, 2010, and the second episode on May 11, 2011, after being postponed twice. The anime has been licensed by Media Blasters, who released a DVD version in 2013 with English Subtitles. When the DVD version of the original episode released there was a bug that would cause the episode to loop to the menu. In response Media Blasters offered to replace them with working copies. There were originally plans to dub the anime but they were later cancelled.

== See also ==
- Nobunaga Teacher's Young Bride – Another manga series by the same author
