= Because I'm the Goddess =

Japanese manga series

- Because I'm the Goddess!
- Cover of the last Japanese manga volume

神様だもの (Kami-sama da Mono)
- Manga
- Written by: Shamneko
- Published by: Wani Books
- English publisher: AUS: Madman Entertainment; NA: Tokyopop
- Magazine: Comic Gum
- Original run: November 25, 2003 – December 24, 2004
- Volumes: 3

Because I'M the Goddess! (Japanese: 神様だもの, Hepburn: Kami-sama da Mono) is a Japanese manga series created by Shamneko and published in Japan by Wani Books. A 3-volume English translation was released by Tokyopop. The story is about a boy named Aoi, who upon meeting Pandora, a Goddess, reluctantly helps her collect gifts she needs to become a complete Goddess.

== Plot ==
God sends a beautiful blond Goddess named Pandora to Earth and commands her to collect "the Gifts", which possess women and enslave men. Pandora seeks these little angels out alongside Aoi, a boy whose hometown she accidentally destroyed with a tidal wave, and a monk named Maya who joined them because they freed him from a Gift. Along the way they meet many people, some nice and some bad, and a love story as well as a plot as big as Heaven itself begins to unfold.

== Characters ==
The Goddess Pandora was created to be the epitome of everything mortal men desire. She appears on Earth as a busty blonde with a bubbly personality and the intellectual capacity of a typical household appliance. She exudes an aura of desirability so powerful that all men she encounters will eagerly do anything she wishes, with Aoi and Maya being the only exceptions. Women are not affected by this power, and in fact find her rather unpleasant. She also speaks in the third person exclusively.

As an adult, Pandora can do almost anything with her divine power, which makes her especially dangerous when combined with her poor impulse control. Her special ability, the Goddess Wish, channels her divine energy into a Wish that she usually doesn't specify—in Volume 2 she changes a store owner's entire shop into solid gold as a thank you for helping her. When Pandora uses a Wish, she reverts to a "lolita" form, where she looks and acts like a more well-behaved ten-year-old girl. To change back, Pandora always needs her slave Aoi around to kiss her and restore her powers.

Pandora's adult form can also "see" when a man is enslaved to a Gift and when a woman is possessed by one. This usually takes the form of an invisible chain around the man's neck, held by the Gift's host. By kissing Aoi and using the spell "Asich Ergalion!", Pandora can transform Aoi's soul into a giant mystical tool (such as an axe, gloves, fan, spoon, etc.) to "break the chain" and free the victims, who have little memory of their possession. The Gift takes the form of a putto, which Pandora absorbs into her own body with no ill effect.

Not long after they first met, Pandora declared Aoi was her manservant, and her repeated affirmations show it's an important thing to her. She promoted him from manservant to special manservant in Volume 1, finally culminating in the end with her admitting she loved him. She gets extremely jealous of anyone giving romantic attention to Aoi, and it sometimes makes her fly off the handle.

Pandora is revealed to be "food" to be eaten for the Gods to regain the powers that were taken from them; namely Zeus. She foils Zeus' plan in the end by killing herself with Aoi's soul as a dagger, breaking her hold over the Gifts and releasing them once again. Pandora's powers were placed within an actual human girl with freckles and brown hair, who can only speak Greek. This is the true Pandora, and the one Aoi finds and takes care of after the battle. She awakens with her memories intact, but can only say Aoi's name in English.

Aoi is a high-school graduate who, despite his punk-like appearance and manner of dress, is well-educated. He finds the adult Pandora's behavior extremely annoying, especially her habit of clinging to him constantly and her lack of any concepts of privacy, personal space, or feminine modesty. However, he recognizes that the Goddess is completely dependent upon him. He actually finds Pandora's child form much more agreeable company, since it brings out his brotherly protective instincts. He is on the run from his family, which is not only wealthy and prestigious but bears numerous connections not only to Pandora but also to the Gifts. Though he claims they aren't blood relatives, in truth his sisters are the adopted ones. Aoi himself is in fact a clone made by his 'Mother', Lady Araragi.

When he is transformed into a battle object by Pandora, Aoi's soul takes the form of the object while his actual body is rendered inert. In this form, Aoi also possesses an awareness that enables him to see the "chain" that signifies the presence of a Gift. However, he cannot move on his own; Pandora must wield his form in order to sever the "chain".

While he often gives in to Pandora's nutty ideas, it's clear he's actually very fond of her, although he cannot stand being called a manservant.

He also does not seem overly fond of Matsun.

Matsun/Matsuyuki is Pandora's guardian/mascot. He is a white cat whose only unique ability appears to be speech and an intelligence much higher than Pandora's. He has the speech, mannerisms, and personality of a flamboyant, chain-smoking drag queen. He divides his time between trying to vainly convince Pandora to focus on her mission and trying to help Aoi cope with his situation by giving him sound, if snidely-delivered, advice. Matsun can also "see" the chains between a man and woman that signify the presence of a Gift. In Volume 3 of the manga, Matsun is revealed to be an incarnation of the Greek legend Prometheus.

Maya Amagi is a novice Buddhist monk (apparently 13 or 14 years old) who had been enslaved to a Gift. After he was freed, he decided to assist Pandora and Aoi in their quest. Maya has a surprisingly effeminate appearance, which is compounded by the fact that unlike most monks he does not shave his head. Since he grew up in an all-female convent, he also exhibits some effeminate behavior despite his insistence that he is male. (Compare with Shun Kisaragi of Here is Greenwood.)

Suzuran Kabahara is the high-school senior niece of an elderly shopkeeper who shelters the quartet in Volume 2 of the manga. About Aoi's age, she exhibits a split personality: while she wears her eyeglasses, she's a properly-behaved schoolgirl; with her glasses off she exhibits a tough, rude, delinquent side. This latter personality regards Aoi as a dog and refers to him as "Jon", but despite her initial dislike of Pandora she eventually is able to befriend her.

"Sotaro" is a mysterious young man who appears to aid Aoi and Pandora early on in the series by kicking a soccer ball into a Slave's face to distract him. His cool demeanor causes Aoi to develop something similar to idolatry afterwards, and he trains hard claiming he wants to be "just like him". He has several different names, it seems, and no backstory to speak of. He is revealed in the 3rd volume to be Aoi's brother and Lady Araragi's Slave. He is a good guy, who helps Aoi out of a sense of brotherhood, but can be a bit of a jerk and likes to mess with him and Pandora.

Shunran Ibara is the younger Ibara sister and a famous singer. She is a sadist who has an obsession with eating the flesh of loved ones—during a nightmare of Aoi's, we see a flashback of her saying she ate her parrot and even one of her maids. In person, she is polite and gentle; even Aoi acknowledges this. Shunran only started her singing so Aoi would hear her voice... but this love turns out to be part of Shunran's obsession. Expressing her desperate desire to "gobble him all up", Shunran accuses Pandora of 'corrupting' Aoi and keeping him away from his family. Shunran takes her on in battle with her Slave and defeats Pandora quite easily... though when Pandora goes to rescue him from the estate, they do battle again. This time Shunran loses and her Slave Bond is severed. Shiran takes her sister away, while Shunran spends the rest of the series as a kind of brainwashed/mindless doll controlled by Shiran's puppeteer, tragically ending her part in the plot.

Shiran Ibara is the older Ibara sibling and a well-known Japanese model. More cool and collected than her sibling, she is also very busy most of the time. Shiran was one of the choices for Aoi to marry when he came of age, though it seems he is and always has been closer to Shunran, though Shiran has shown a caring side towards her siblings. A while after Shunran is defeated and more Gifts have been dealt with Shiran takes the stage herself proclaiming that Aoi seems to constantly force her hand which is tiresome. Shiran was apparently responsible for turning Shunran into a brainwashed doll before she took on Pandora with a similar sword to Shunran (Shiran's is longer and thinner). The stronger Pandora was able to damage Shiran's blade, but found herself in a tight spot because Shiran laid down her weapon and goaded Pandora to kill her. When Pandora refused in panic, Shiran coldly stabbed her in the ribs calling her "A sweet fool". Despite her wounds, Pandora was able to disarm Shiran and shatter her sword, thus severing her Bond, though Shiran remained defiant to the end. After her defeat she and Shunran are 'disposed of' by Sotaro and not seen again.

Lady Araragi is the head of the Ibara household and the original Goddess made by Zeus. She was madly in love with Matsuyuki when he was a human, and spent a hundred years trying to find him. She holds several of the Gifts and is possessed by the Gift of Lust. She is terribly powerful, and has many cloned children who were used for experiments—Aoi is the only successful clone, with the others being too weak or too frail to even venture outside.

Zeus, the God who created Pandora, is a diminutive crowned child with a big ego and an even bigger mount, which he calls 'Kratos'. When his power was taken from him many years ago, it was broken up and scattered across Japan as 'Gifts'. His first attempt to retrieve them failed, and it took him so much energy to make her that he slept for a century. Upon awakening, he creates Pandora and sends her to Earth to do the job properly. She succeeds in Volume 3, defeating his previous Goddess and confronting him. Pandora plans to kill Zeus but realizes that without the Gifts and the power of chaos, Man has no will to live. She instead kills herself, and Zeus is forced back to Heaven to sleep for another hundred years.

== Gifts and their Slaves ==
The Gifts Pandora seeks are beings that possess women, accentuating their will to dominate (especially sexually) and causing those women to take men as their slaves. The slaves, once they are linked to the Gift, will obey her without question regardless of danger or humiliation. Each Gift is an individual being, whom Pandora knows by name.

Beginning with Volume 2 of the manga, the Gifts' possessors can also transform the souls of their slaves (along with the "chains" binding them) into mystical weapons with which to do battle with Pandora. A breaking of concentration will revert the slaves back into their original bodies and re-manifest the "chains", which are now vulnerable to Pandora's attack.

== Media ==
=== Manga ===
==== Volume list ====
No.	Original release date	Original ISBN	English release date	English ISBN
1	November 25, 2003	978-4-8470-3459-6	August 8, 2006	978-1-59816-488-6
2	July 24, 2004	978-4-8470-3473-2	November 28, 2006	978-1-59816-489-3
3	December 24, 2004	978-4-8470-3487-9	April 3, 2007	978-1-59816-490-9

== Reception ==
"The truth of the matter is simple, if you’re a fan of Love Hina minus the love bits, then this will certain float your boat. Anyone else looking for more story and less over the top cute chibi characters to express a range of emotions, best look elsewhere." — Kevin Leathers, UK Anime Network. "Now there's nothing wrong with a guy being drawn as a cute female girl, but then Aoi begins to show more interest in Amagi than Pandora. Suddenly we have a magical-girl-loli-yaoi book." — A. E. Sparrow, IGN. "With plenty of provocative drawings of busty Pandora, this manga seems designed to titillate—but like that old genie sitcom, there are fun, humorous storylines behind the boobs." — Carrie Shepard, Newtype USA. "This is a funny story if you give it a chance and a must read for fans of cute girls and voluptuous women because you get 'em both at the same time!" — Matthew Alexander, Mania.
