= Sogabe =

Sogabe is a Japanese surname that may refer to

- Kazuko Sogabe (曽我部 和子, born 1936), Japanese Olympic gymnast
- Kazuyuki Sogabe (曽我部 和恭 (formerly 曽我部 和行), 1948–2006), Japanese voice actor
- Toshinori Sogabe (宗我部 としのり, born 1975), Japanese manga artist
