= Tsukuyomi: Moon Phase =

Japanese manga and anime series

- Tsukuyomi: Moon Phase volume 1

月詠 (Tsukuyomi)
- Genre: Comedy, Romance, Supernatural
- Manga
- Written by: Keitarō Arima
- Published by: Wani Books
- English publisher: AUS: Madman Entertainment; NA: Tokyopop
- Magazine: Comic Gum
- Original run: March 2000 – March 27, 2008
- Volumes: 16
- Anime television series
- Directed by: Akiyuki Shinbo (Note: Chief Director (総監督).); Toshimasa Suzuki (Note: Director's Assistant (監督補佐).)
- Produced by: Hiroshi Yoshida (Flying Dog); Hiroyuki Birukawa (Nippon Victor)
- Written by: Mayori Sekijima
- Music by: Daisaku Kume
- Studio: Shaft
- Licensed by: AUS: Madman Entertainment; NA: Crunchyroll; UK: Revelation Films
- Original network: TV Tokyo, TV Osaka
- English network: US: AZN Television, Funimation Channel
- Original run: October 5, 2004 – March 29, 2005
- Episodes: 25 + OVA

Tsukuyomi: Moon Phase (Japanese: 月詠, Hepburn: Tsukuyomi) is a Japanese manga series by Keitarō Arima. The manga was serialized in the monthly manga magazine Comic Gum from March 2000 to March 27, 2008. The series spanned sixteen manga volumes that were published by Wani Books in Japan. The manga series was later adapted into a 25 episode anime television series by Shaft, and aired on TV Tokyo from October 5, 2004, to March 29, 2005. An additional OVA episode dubbed "Episode 26" was later released only on DVD on February 22, 2006. Moon Phase is about a young vampire girl named Hazuki and a Japanese freelance photographer Kouhei Morioka whom Hazuki attempts to make into her servant.

While there are differences in adaptations, the main theme of Kouhei protecting Hazuki from harm is present in both. The OVA storyline though has very little to do with the original series outside of having some of the same characters, and has a completely different storyline which does not fit into anything which came before it. Tokyopop published an English-language version of the manga but stopped at volume 12 due to the company shutting down its North American publishing division which left the series unfinished. For the anime, Funimation released an English-language version under the name Moon Phase.

== Plot ==
The story is about the relationship between freelance photographer Kouhei Morioka and Hazuki, a young girl who descends from a royal vampire lineage. At the beginning of the story, Kouhei travels to a castle in Southwest Germany to take photographs of paranormal phenomena for his friend Hiromi, who is the editor of an occult magazine. At the castle, Kouhei meets Hazuki, who feeds on Kouhei's blood and claims him as her unwilling servant. Although this "blood pact" is supposed to bind Kouhei to Hazuki as her obedient slave, her act has no effect on Kouhei. Following an action-packed sorcerers' battle in which Kouhei and his cousin manage to free Hazuki from her captivity in the dreary castle, Hazuki travels to Tokyo, and takes up residence with Kouhei in his grandfather's house in Japan. Hazuki claims that, because she fed on his blood, Kouhei is now her servant, but Kouhei continually refuses to obey her, especially when he thinks her requests are unreasonable. Despite their fighting, the relationship between the duo progresses over time—even in the face of repeated attacks by opposing vampires—until Kouhei becomes determined to protect Hazuki from the vampire servants of her family, who are determined to retrieve her by whatever means necessary.

== Manga ==
Tsukuyomi Moon Phase was written by Keitarō Arima, and originally published by Wani Books. The manga series ran from March 2000 to March 24, 2009, in which sixteen volumes were published. The manga was later licensed in Taiwan by Sharp Point Press. Tokyopop and Madman Entertainment both had English releases for the manga but due to financial trouble, Tokyopop postponed some of the dates. On May 31, 2011, Tokyopop announced that all of their licensed titles would revert to their Japanese owners leaving the series incomplete.

Volume	Japanese		English	
Volume	ISBN	Release date	ISBN	Release date
1	ISBN 4-8470-3342-6	March 2000	ISBN 1-59532-948-X	December 12, 2005
2	ISBN 4-8470-3361-2	September 2000	ISBN 1-59532-949-8	March 7, 2006
3	ISBN 4-8470-3395-7	April 2001	ISBN 1-59532-950-1	June 13, 2006
4	ISBN 4-8470-3423-6	December 2001	ISBN 1-59532-951-X	September 12, 2006
5	ISBN 4-8470-3432-5	June 2002	ISBN 1-59532-952-8	December 12, 2006
6	ISBN 4-8470-3443-0	February 2003	ISBN 1-59532-953-6	March 13, 2007
7	ISBN 4-8470-3457-0	October 24, 2003	ISBN 1-59532-954-4	June 12, 2007
8	ISBN 4-8470-3469-4	May 22, 2004	ISBN 1-59532-955-2	September 11, 2007
9	ISBN 4-8470-3486-4	December 24, 2004	ISBN 1-4278-0163-0	December 11, 2007
10	ISBN 4-8470-3509-7	July 25, 2005	ISBN 1-4278-0164-9	April 8, 2008
11	ISBN 4-8470-3535-6	March 25, 2006	ISBN 1-4278-0726-4	August 8, 2008
12	ISBN 4-8470-3578-X	October 25, 2006	ISBN 1-4278-0727-2	November 4, 2008
13	ISBN 4-8470-3597-6	April 25, 2007	ISBN 978-1-4278-1161-5	Postponed By Tokyopop and never released.
14	ISBN 4-8470-3619-0	November 24, 2007	—	—
15	ISBN 4-8470-3647-6	July 24, 2008	—	—
16	ISBN 4-8470-3677-8	March 24, 2009	—	—

== Anime ==
=== Theme music ===
==== Opening ====
1. "Neko Mimi Mode" by Dimitri from Paris (eps 1–8, 10–13, 15–24)
2. "Tsuku Yomi Mode" by Dimitri from Paris (eps 9, 14)

==== Ending ====
1. "Kanashii Yokan"
  - Lyrics, Composition, and Arrangement: Yukari Hashimoto
  - Vocals: Marianne Amplifier, featuring Yuka
2. "Nami no Toriko ni naru you ni" (ep 7)
  - Lyrics: Kenzō Saeki
  - Composition and Arrangement: Naruyoshi Kikuchi
  - Vocals: Noriko Ogawa
3. "Pressentiment triste" by Marianne Amplifier featuring Yuka (ep 19)
4. "Neko Mimi Mode" by Dimitri From Paris (ep 25)

== Reception ==
Hyper commends the anime for its "character design and animation which are uniformly quite good and the series boasts some very nice Gothic background art". The scripting is criticised for being "too cluttered to allow any immersion".
