= Ikki Tousen: Dragon Destiny =

- Season 2
- No. of episodes: 12

Release
- Original network: AT-X, Chiba TV, KBS Kyoto, TV Kanagawa, Tokyo MX, Sun Television, TV Aichi, and TV Saitama
- Original release: February 26 – May 14, 2007

Season chronology
- ← Previous; Season 1 Next → Ikki Tousen: Great Guardians

The second season of Ikki Tousen, titled Ikki Tousen: Dragon Destiny, is an anime television series based on the manga by Yuji Shiozaki, published by Wani Books and serialized in the seinen manga magazine Comic GUM. A second season, titled Ikki Tousen: Dragon Destiny (一騎当千 Dragon Destiny, Ikkitōsen Doragon Desutinī), aired 12 episodes on AT-X between February 26, 2007, and May 14, 2007, with subsequent broadcasts on Chiba TV, KBS Kyoto, TV Kanagawa, Tokyo MX, Sun Television, TV Aichi, and TV Saitama. Produced by ARMS, the series is directed by Koichi Ohata, series composition by Takao Yoshioka, music by Yasuharu Takanashi, characters by Rin-Sin, and produced by Osamu Koshinaka, Shinsaku Tanaka, Takuro Hatakeyama, and Yoshikazu Beniya. The opening theme is "HEART&SOUL" by Mai Kariyuki while the ending theme is Garasu no Hana (硝子の花, "Glass Flower") by IORI. The anime is licensed in North America by Media Blasters. The anime is also licensed in Australia and New Zealand by Madman Entertainment, as with the first season.

== Episode list ==
No. overall	No. in season	Title	Original release date
14	1	"Signs of the Dragon Spirit"; Transliteration: "Ryūkon Taidō" (Japanese: 龍魂胎動)	February 26, 2007
15	2	"The Evil Lord Awakens"; Transliteration: "Maō Kakusei" (Japanese: 魔王覚醒)	March 5, 2007
16	3	"Bloodshed and Tears"; Transliteration: "Rūketsu Rakusei" (Japanese: 流血落涙)	March 12, 2007
17	4	"Chance Meeting of the Two Dragons"; Transliteration: "Niryū Kaikō" (Japanese: 弐龍邂逅)	March 19, 2007
18	5	"Ruthless Fighters"; Transliteration: "Tōshi Muzan" (Japanese: 闘士無惨)	March 26, 2007
19	6	"Encounter with the Crouching Dragon"; Transliteration: "Fukuryū Hōchaku" (Japanese: 伏龍逢着)	April 2, 2007
20	7	"Kanu Surrenders"; Transliteration: "Kan'u Tōkō" (Japanese: 関羽投降)	April 9, 2007
21	8	"The Little Conqueror's Heroic Death"; Transliteration: "Shōhaō Sanga" (Japanese: 小覇王散華)	April 16, 2007
22	9	"Friendships in Chaos"; Transliteration: "Yūgi Metsuretsu" (Japanese: 友義滅裂)	April 23, 2007
23	10	"The Wandering Koukin"; Transliteration: "Kōrin Ruten" (Japanese: 公瑾流転)	April 30, 2007
24	11	"Fighter Melee"; Transliteration: "Tōshi Ransen" (Japanese: 闘士乱戦)	May 7, 2007
25	12	"Red Cliffs in Flames"; Transliteration: "Sekiheki Enjō" (Japanese: 赤壁炎上)	May 14, 2007

== Home media ==
=== Japanese ===
Six DVD volumes were released by Media Factory between July 25, 2007, and November 22, 2007. The DVD volumes contain an original video animation called Dragon Destiny: Great Battle at the Red Cliffs Hot Springs (Dragon Destiny 赤壁温泉大決戦, Doragon Desutinī: Sekiheki Onsen Dai Kessen), featuring the female cast in a hot spring setting. A DVD box set was later released on December 22, 2009.

=== English ===
Media Blasters released the series on three DVD volumes between November 24, 2009, and April 20, 2010. A box set was later released on August 31, 2010.
