= Ikki Tousen: Great Guardians =

- Season 3
- No. of episodes: 12

Release
- Original network: AT-X, Chiba TV, TV Saitama, TV Aichi, TV Kanagawa, Sun Television, Tokyo MX
- Original release: June 11 – August 27, 2008

Season chronology
- ← Previous; Ikki Tousen: Dragon Destiny Next → Ikki Tousen: Xtreme Xecutor

The third season of Ikki Tousen, titled Ikki Tousen: Great Guardians, is an anime television series based on the manga by Yuji Shiozaki, published by Wani Books and serialized in the seinen manga magazine Comic GUM. A third season, titled Ikki Tousen: Great Guardians (一騎当千 Great Guardians, Ikkitōsen Gurēto Gādianzu), aired 12 episodes on AT-X between June 11 and August 27, 2008, with subsequent broadcasts on Chiba TV, TV Saitama, TV Aichi, TV Kanagawa, Sun Television, and Tokyo MX. Produced by ARMS, the series is directed by Koichi Ohata, series composition by Masanao Akahoshi, music by Yasuharu Takanashi, characters by Rin Shin, and produced by Hisato Usui, Nobusaku Tanaka, Osamu Ecchu, Takuro Hatakeyama, and Yasuhiro Mikami. The opening theme is "No x limit" by Ami while the ending theme is "Kage: Shape of Shadow" (影～shape of shadow～) by Rio Asaba. The series was licensed by Media Blasters, as with the second season, but it is now licensed by Funimation Entertainment after they withdrew the license.

== Episode list ==
No. overall	No. in season	Title	Original release date
26	1	"War Is of Vital Importance to the State"; Transliteration: "Hei wa Kuni no Daiji nari" (Japanese: 兵は国の大事なり)	June 11, 2008
27	2	"All Warfare Is Based on Deception"; Transliteration: "Hei to wa Kidō nari" (Japanese: 兵とは詭道なり)	June 18, 2008
28	3	"Nor Can the Dead Be Brought Back to Life"; Transliteration: "Shisha wa Fukuta Ikube Karazu" (Japanese: 死者は復た生くべからず)	June 25, 2008
29	4	"Regard Soldiers as Your Children"; Transliteration: "Sotsu o Miru Koto Eiji no Gotoshi" (Japanese: 卒を視ること嬰児のごとし)	July 2, 2008
30	5	"Do Not Fight Unless It Is Critical"; Transliteration: "Ayauki ni Arazareba Tatakawazu" (Japanese: 危うきに非ざれば戦わず)	July 9, 2008
31	6	"Intelligence Makes Great Spies"; Transliteration: "Jōchi o Motte Kanja to Nasu" (Japanese: 上智を以て間者と為す)	July 16, 2008
32	7	"At First, Like a Virgin"; Transliteration: "Hajime wa Shojo no Gotoku" (Japanese: 始めは処女の如く)	July 23, 2008
33	8	"Do Unto Others, Do Not Let Them Do Unto You"; Transliteration: "Hito o Itashite Hito ni Itasarezu" (Japanese: 人を致して人に致されず)	July 30, 2008
34	9	"The Bigger Odds Wins, the Smaller Odds Loses"; Transliteration: "San Ōki wa Kachi, San Sukunaki wa Katazu" (Japanese: 算多きは勝ち、算少なきは勝たず)	August 6, 2008
35	10	"Strike the Enemy's Plan"; Transliteration: "Jōhei wa Hakarigoto o Utsu" (Japanese: 上兵は謀を伐つ)	August 13, 2008
36	11	"Start by Taking Away the Ones They Love"; Transliteration: "Mazu Sono Aisuru Tokoro o Ubau" (Japanese: 先ずその愛する所を奪う)	August 20, 2008
37	12	"Coming Together"; Transliteration: "Atsumari te Ichi to Naru" (Japanese: 専まりて一と為る)	August 27, 2008

== Home media ==
=== Japanese ===
Six DVD compilation volumes were released by Media Factory between September 25, 2008, and February 25, 2009, each volume containing an original video animation called Battle Tour Club: Sexy Cosplay♥Dangerous Jobs♥ (バトルツアークラブ･セクシーコスプレ♥危険なアルバイト♥). A DVD boxset was released on March 25, 2010.
