= Kita e =

Japanese game series and its adaptations

- The cover of the Complete Collection DVD edition of the Diamond Daydreams anime, released by ADV Films

北へ。
- Genre: Romance
- Video game
- Developer: Red Company
- Publisher: Hudson Soft
- Genre: Communication game, Visual novel, Dating sim Romance
- Platform: Dreamcast, PlayStation 2
- Released: March 18, 1999 (Dreamcast); October 30, 2003 (PS2)
- Original video animation

Pure Session
- Directed by: Takafumi Iieri (chief); Mitsuko Kase
- Produced by: Toshiya Ichimanda; Kenji Hagino; Takeharu Oguri
- Studio: Studio D-Volt; Shaft (assistance)
- Released: May 31, 2000
- Runtime: 23 minutes
- Anime television series

Diamond Daydreams
- Directed by: Bob Shirohata
- Produced by: Shun Shimizu, Satoshi Fujita, Takeshi Oguri, Norimitsu Urasaki, Keiji Hamada
- Written by: Ryōta Yamaguchi
- Music by: Takehiko Gokita
- Studio: Studio Deen
- Licensed by: NA: ADV Films
- Original network: TVh, AT-X
- Original run: January 20, 2004 – April 5, 2004
- Episodes: 12
- Manga

Kita e. ~Diamond Dust Drops~
- Published by: Wani Books
- Magazine: Comic Gum
- Published: May 2005
- Volumes: 1

Kita e (北へ。; "Northward.") is a Japanese game series, set in Hokkaidō. The series was developed by Red Company and published by Hudson Soft. An anime version and a manga adaptation have also been released.

== History ==
The series began with Kita e: White Illumination (北へ。White Illumination), which was released on March 18, 1999, for the Dreamcast. A fan disc, Kita e: Photo Memories (北へ。Photo Memories), was released on August 5 that same year. On October 30, 2003, the series hit the PlayStation 2 platform as Kita e. ～Diamond Dust～ (北へ。～Diamond Dust～) was released. A sequel to Diamond Dust, Kita e: Diamond Dust + Kiss is Beginning came out October 28, 2004. An animated music video based on the visual novel entitled Kita e. ～Pure Session～ (北へ。～PURE SESSION～) was released on May 31, 2000. An anime series entitled Kita e. ～Diamond Dust Drops～ (北へ。～Diamond Dust Drops～) was adapted from the two Diamond Dust games. The anime was released in the United States by ADV Films under the title Diamond Daydreams in three volumes and later in a thinpack re-release.

== White Illumination ==
=== Gameplay ===
The game takes place in modern Japan and (unusually for a dating sim) uses actual photographs of Hokkaidō as background art, while the character sprites are illustrations. Game interaction is achieved through a menu of action options, such as sleeping, using your cell phone, waiting, saving, or going somewhere. When choosing to go somewhere, the player selects a location in Hokkaidō from the menu in order to travel there. Upon arrival in the chosen area, the game shows and describes the scene in visual novel format, with text layered on a graphical background. Visiting locations at different in-game times yields different results; for example, a shop may be closed or a character may not be there if the player visits at an inopportune time. When a character is encountered, a conversation is initiated and the player can occasionally select dialogue options. As in other dating sims, the protagonist's relationships with the other characters can be affected positively or negatively by the chosen options.

=== Story ===
The player, a second-year high school student (17 years old), travels from Tokyo to Sapporo in Hokkaidō (hence the basic title of the game Kita E (To the North). There, he encounters eight different girls, including the lead character Kotori Haruno, whose family he stays with during his time up north. In the game, the player explores the island, plays video games, does karaoke, goes shopping—and most of all, tries to find that special someone to share his heart with. The main period of the game is set during summer vacation (August 1 to August 14), by which, at the end, the player returns to Tokyo. The conclusion of the game falls around December 28, when the player returns to Sapporo to witness the "White Illumination Countdown" on New Year's Eve (similar to the New Year's Eve Times Square celebrations). To win the game, the player must meet his chosen one at the Countdown on New Year's Eve, then kiss her at 12:00 midnight on New Year's Day.

=== Characters ===
Kotori Haruno (春野 琴梨, Haruno Kotori)
Voiced by: Saeko Chiba
Kotori is a 15-year-old high school student. Her primary hobby is that she loves to cook. She lives alone with her mother Yoko (her father is deceased). Since Yoko works so much, Kotori maintains the home. The player has feelings for Kotori, but the latter reciprocates (at the start of the game) in a fashion similar to that between siblings.
Tanya Lipinski (ターニャ・リピンスキー, Tānya Ripinsukī)
Voiced by: Maaya Sakamoto
Tanya is a 16-year-old glass craftsman's assistant. She loves to take strolls around the neighbourhood. Born in Russia, Tanya is working in Japan at a local glass factory and is having much in the way of trouble adjusting to live in another country away from her family. Working at the factory, she tries to duplicate the shade of sunset displayed on a pendant given to her by her father.
Kaoru Shiina (椎名 薫, Shiina Kaoru)
Voiced by: Yoshiko Sakakibara
Kaoru is a 24-year-old medical student at a local university. The player meets her first on the airplane from Tokyo to Sapporo. She loves to go driving and read mystery novels. At first meeting, Kaoru seems cold and unapproachable, always with her head inside a book. As the player sees her more and more, she begins to open up.
Yuko Sakuramachi (桜町 由子, Sakuramachi Yūko)
Voiced by: Omi Minami
Yuko is a 20-year-old public defence officer. She loves to take pictures with her camera, which she carries with her even while on duty. While performing her duties on a bicycle, Yuko often interacts with the player and willingly takes pictures of him when they tour all the interesting places he wishes to visit.
Megumi Aida (愛田 めぐみ, Aida Megumi)
Voiced by: Ikue Ōtani
Megumi is a 15-year-old junior high student. She loves to collect postcards, gazes at the stars and studies animals. A cute yet very clumsy girl. The player interacts with Megumi when he goes to the Aida family home to assist her and her parents (including a pregnant mother). Megumi is the atypical genki and innocent young girl.
Ayu Kawahara (川原 鮎, Kawahara Ayu)
Voiced by: Kai Hirohashi
Ayu is a 15-year-old high school student and Kotori's best friend. She loves to play tennis (she is a part of the school tennis club with Kotori) and karaoke. It is Ayu's ambition to become a professional singer. The player supports her music and helps her when it comes time for Ayu to get an audition.
Hayaka Sakyo (左京 葉野香, Sakyō Hayaka)
Voiced by: Ayako Kawasumi
Hayaka is a 17-year-old high school student. She likes to knit. At first meeting, Hayaka is a very unpleasant girl (as witness the fact that she wears an eyepatch). The player learns later that her family restaurant is in trouble with the local thugs, thus he strives to help her with recipes and advertising.
Kozue Satonaka (里中 梢, Satonaka Kozue)
Voiced by: Megumi Toyoguchi
Kozue is a 17-year-old high school student. She's into cosplay, games and e-mailing on her personal computer. The spoiled rich girl of the cast, she is heavily into anime and other forms of modern entertainment. Like all other spoiled rich kids, she always gets what she wanted -- until she met the player.

=== Game information ===
The game was released on March 13, 1999, by Hudson Soft, exclusively for the Dreamcast system. The average price for the game at time of release was 5800 yen.

== Diamond Dustdrops ==
=== Story ===
The story is about six different girls from different lifestyles living on Hokkaidō in Japan. They each live in a different city on the island. Each girl believes in a myth of snow turning into diamond dust, and if one makes a wish on the diamond dust, their wish is 100% guaranteed to come true. Another myth about diamond dust is that if a boy and girl meet under the dust, they're guaranteed happiness and marriage later in life. Each of the six girls have some stubborn moments and awkward stages in their lives, but looking into themselves and others will help them get back on their feet. When these six girls meet, their lives will change dramatically for the better as the snow begins to fall.

=== Characters ===
Atsuko Akanegi (茜木 温子, Akanegi Atsuko)
Voiced by: Eriko Ishihara (Japanese); Jessica Boone (English)
Atsuko is Hakodate-born and Hakodate-bred. She lives inside a food store with her mother. The store and the family are deep in debt, and to resolve their financial problems her mother tries to urge Atsuko into an arranged marriage with a wealthy yet friendly boy her own age named Minoru Jinguji. Atsuko is conflicted by her feelings for an older man, Kenji Kurata, who is a local musician.
When her mother tries to force her into the marriage, Atsuko runs away to Kurata. He helps Atsuko out, and talks to her about her situation without taking advantage of her. At the end she realizes that she may have feelings for Minoru - she just doesn't want to be forced into marriage.
Karin Shiraishi (白石 果鈴, Shiraishi Karin)
Voiced by: Ao Takahashi (Japanese); Kira Vincent-Davis (English)
Karin is stricken with pneumothorax and lives mostly in the hospital. Her big brother Mitsuru comes by occasionally from college to help cheer her up. She has her own laptop which she is only supposed to use for two hours a day, though she sneaks on at night. Karin has her own homepage where she occasionally updates and writes about her dreams.
A new young doctor named Amakasu says that Karin is a spoiled princess, causing Karin to lose her temper. In truth, Karin is scared to have an operation because her father died during surgery. She gets e-mails from someone named "Your Fan" who encourages her to stay strong. Karin speculates that Dr. Amakasu is sending her the e-mails and attached photos of Hokkaidō, and Karin finds herself falling in love with Dr. Amakasu.
She later finds out that Nurse Yuki and Dr. Amakasu have been seeing each other since high school, and Yuki was the one sending her the e-mails. Her intentions were trying to open up to Karin and convincing her to go through operation. A few days afterwards, Karin's brother is sent to the hospital when he falls unconscious at work. Her brother had been overworking himself trying to help their mother pay the massive hospitalization fees. Karin realizes that she is spoiled, and decides to go through with the operation if Dr. Amakasu will watch over her.
Kyouko Asahina (朝比奈 京子, Asahina Kyōko)
Voiced by: Mamiko Noto (Japanese); Kaytha Coker (English)
Kyouko is a young filmmaker who loves to capture life's moments on film. Her closest friends and colleagues begin to worry about Kyouko's obsession with perfection, and it causes major conflicts. However, Kyouko's willing to sacrifice everything to achieve the perfect picture.
Kyouko tells a story about a girl named Charinka who forsaken Yoshitsune while living on an island, but when Yoshitsune leaves the island, Charinka regretted her cold-heartedness - too late. Kyouko says that Charinka got what she deserved.
After her pride causes her to isolate herself even from the person she loves, Kyouko learns the hard way that the people who care about you are more important than winning.
Suomi Kitano (北野 スオミ, Kitano Suomi)
Voiced by: Mayu Amase (Japanese); Luci Christian (English)
Suomi loves ice skating and is a natural performer. When Suomi was young, she and her friend Hanna Janinen made a promise to each other. Now that she's grown up, she hopes to fulfill her promise. Suomi was chosen to be part of Finland's figure skating team, but Hanna accidentally bumped into her causing Suomi to injure her leg, causing rumors that Hanna did it on purpose and it earned her the moniker of "The Cold-Hearted Queen of the Ice". Because of that, Hanna blamed Suomi. Suomi almost gave up skating until she meets a young boy named Haruto who is also an ice skater and had a similar fallout with his best friend Kuda. Now, Suomi hopes to get back into ice skating and complete her promise with Hanna.
Shouko Saibara (催馬楽 笙子, Saibara Shōko)
Voiced by: Urara Takano (Japanese); Allison Sumrall (English)
Shouko hosts a radio talk show in Sapporo called "Cappuccino Break" where she discusses romantic issues with her audience. Every love story Shoko hears is fuel for her talk show. Secretly, Shouko is dating her closest friend Takeda whom she loves, but Takeda is already married with a wife and daughter and warns Shouko not to make unexpected scenes. Elsewhere, Shouko receives gifts from someone called "Radio Boy", which gets the production staff worried that Shouko might have a potential stalker after her. When a woman calls in to the show about her heartaches with a married man, Shouko breaks down and says on the air that she wants to give up. Her fans call and come in to support her, showing her that she's not as alone as she thinks.
Akari Harada (原田 明理, Harada Akari)
Voiced by: Akeno Watanabe (Japanese); Kelli Cousins (English)
Akari has lived with her father ever since her mother died. Most of the time, her father drinks a lot of alcohol to ease the pain of losing his wife. He's also unsuccessful in trying to pan for gold dust. Akari is a hard worker at Ryuon Confectioneries to support them both, and does most of the work in her house because her father is too weak and depressed to help. Akari also has run-ins with Kurokawa, a former coworker who has trouble expressing his feelings for her.
Suddenly, her father becomes very ill with brain cancer. The doctor mentioned to Akari that her father was diagnosed with brain cancer six months ago and was recommended to go to a university hospital that had the proper equipment. As of now, it would be impossible for the surgeons to operate on his tumor. To help ease his pain she goes with her father to the river one last time to pan for gold dust, with Kurokawa's help. Kurokawa has trouble committing himself to the work he loves, but during the trip Akari's father helps him see that he should follow his passions.

Jurota Tokibi and Mafuyu Morinaga: This unfortunate guy and melancholy woman appear at various points throughout the anime series as a cheeky nod to players of the game as well as supplying some comic relief. In fact, in the third DVD of the collection, Jurota is described by the director as "He's the character who just can't seem to fall in love with any heroine in the game." However, in episode 12, these two background characters come to the foreground at the very end and mysteriously meet up with Mafuyu sending a final message to Shoko's radio show saying (in the English dub) "I've decided I'm going to tell him everything. I hope his feelings for me don't change once he knows the truth." Leaving the viewer to wonder what the secret was. I was unable to find anything definitive such as a game guide or a copy of the game, however the profile for Morinaga Mafuyu on "The Visual Novel Database" has one of her listed traits as "Transwoman" (https://vndb.org/c9578) so this is most likely the secret Mafuyu was going to share with Jurota. Mafuyu was also apparently a secret option in the game and difficult to encounter, so I'm sure this section of the anime at the end was quite a payoff to the few superfans who encountered her.

== Staff and Development ==
The games are illustrated by NOCCHI.

== Reception ==
White Illumination sold 25 thousand copies in its first week.

The anime adaptation received positive, albeit not spectacular, reviews. Anime News Network's Theron Martin said that "the series as a whole is very approachable even to those who aren't normally anime fans." and "It doesn't forge any new ground and isn't outstandingly creative in the stories it tells, but it doesn't need to be to deliver a quality product." Zac Bertschy, also with ANN, called the anime unremarkable and "fairly banal", but did say that "It's really refreshing to watch a show based on a dating sim that doesn't make you wish you could reach through the screen and slap the characters around a little bit." Zac and Theron also praised ADV Films' English dubbing, saying that the English dialogue track "adds a lot to an already enjoyable little show", and "ultimately enhances the story rather than being a detriment." Both ANN reviewers gave the show a B+ overall.

In a review for Mania.com, Mark Thomas wrote that the "stories are well played out, with believable actions and reactions from the characters, and despite only having two episodes each to work with, the characters are well rounded.... What makes this show even nicer is that even the secondary characters are given enough to work with that makes them real."
