= Tetragrammaton Labyrinth =

Japanese manga series

- Cover of Tetragrammaton Labyrinth volume one, as published by Seven Seas Entertainment

断罪者〜Tetragrammaton Labyrinth〜 (Danzaisha Tetragrammaton Labyrinth)
- Genre: Action, Horror, Yuri
- Manga
- Written by: Ei Itou
- Published by: Wani Books
- English publisher: NA: Seven Seas Entertainment
- Magazine: Comic Gum
- Original run: January 26, 2005 – November 26, 2007
- Volumes: 6

Tetragrammaton Labyrinth (Japanese: 断罪者〜Tetragrammaton Labyrinth〜, Hepburn: Danzaisha Tetragrammaton Labyrinth) is a Japanese manga series written and illustrated by Ei Itou. The manga was serialized in the Japanese seinen manga magazine Comic Gum between January 26, 2005, and November 26, 2007, published by Wani Books. The manga has been licensed by Los Angeles–based company Seven Seas Entertainment for distribution in the English language. The first English-bound volume was released on June 30, 2007, with the second and third being released on November 28, 2007, and July 8, 2008, respectively. The fourth volume was released in December 2008.

== Plot ==
Tetragrammaton Labyrinth is set in alternate c.1900 industrial London, wherein Scotland Yard doesn't interfere with Meg Cross, a nun with a special talent in exorcism, and her eternally youthful partner Angela who deal with extraordinary crimes. To keep mankind safe from the creatures that lurk in the shadows Meg and Angela continue to exterminate demons and bring demon summoners to justice.

== Characters ==
Margaret Cross (マーガレット・クロス)
More commonly referred to as Meg. At first look she is a nun who acts as guardian to Angela. Both of them are in service to the Organization, whose work consists of fighting demons. Her weapon of choice is a gun. She also relies on her Christian faith, which in the story can be utilized as magical power. Volume 3 reveals that the relation of Meg to Angela is nearly the reverse of first appearances. Years ago Angela had declared that because Meg was tainted by a demon, it was best for young Meg to die so that she could go to heaven. Young Meg wanted so much to live that Angela relented and took Meg under her protection. As Meg grew into a young adult, their public roles reversed so that Meg took on the role of Angela's caretaker. According to Angela, the cross Meg wears suspended around her neck serves a special purpose as a safety valve.
Angela (アンジェラ)
The eternally twelve-year-old partner of Meg. Angela can not die, and therefore she cannot go to heaven, though she wishes very much that she could. She says that so long as Meg needs her, she will exist and will be there for her. As revealed in Volume 4, many centuries ago Gilles de Rais had massacred all the children of a village. Angela had not died, but had lost her soul instead. Angela had found a new meaning to her existence when she met and protected young Meg Cross, as Meg was the first person she had met who truly needed her. Angela's weapon of choice is a scythe.
The Organization
Created by Angela to protect her and serve as her eyes and ears. Members of the Organization include The Professor, who provides Angela with a new scythe; Bianca, the Professor's assistant; the Magus; Trude Kurtz, a daughter of The Magus; and Gertrude Kurtz, the younger daughter of The Magus.
Edward Wise (エドワード・ワイズ)
A Scotland Yard police detective. When a demon possesses a woman he was close to, Meg and Angela confront the demon possessing her. Wise interferes, delaying Meg and Angela to the point that they can no longer save Edith's life. Detective Wise assists Angela in the fight against the demon, succeeding in killing Edith in time so that Edith's soul could go to heaven. He returns to the story as a recruit of the Organization, assisting Meg and Angela in their second fight against the demon Prelati.
Hisame (緋褪)
Hisame is a miko from the east in search of a treasured sword that was stolen when war broke out in her country. While their first encounter is confrontational, she is later recruited into the Organization and assists Meg and Angela.
