= Ah My Buddha =

Japanese manga series

- First edition of Amaenaide yo

あまえないでよっ!! (Amaenaide yo!!)
- Genre: Fantasy comedy; Harem; Supernatural
- Manga
- Written by: Toshinori Sogabe
- Published by: Wani Books
- Magazine: Comic Gum
- Original run: March 25, 2004 – February 24, 2007
- Volumes: 7
- Anime television series
- Directed by: Keitaro Motonaga
- Produced by: Keiji Hamada; Machiko Fujiwara
- Written by: Makoto Uezu
- Music by: Yasunori Iwasaki
- Studio: Studio Deen
- Licensed by: NA: Nozomi Entertainment
- Original network: AT-X
- Original run: July 1, 2005 – September 16, 2005
- Episodes: 12 + 1 bonus
- Anime television series

Amaenaide yo!! Katsu!!
- Directed by: Keitaro Motonaga
- Produced by: Keiji Hamada; Machiko Fujiwara
- Written by: Makoto Uezu
- Music by: Yasunori Iwasaki
- Studio: Studio Deen
- Licensed by: NA: Nozomi Entertainment
- Original network: AT-X
- Original run: January 4, 2006 – March 22, 2006
- Episodes: 12 + 1 bonus
- Manga

Amaenaide yo MS
- Written by: Bohemian K
- Illustrated by: Toshinori Sogabe
- Published by: Wani Books
- Magazine: Comic Gum
- Original run: July 25, 2007 – August 22, 2009
- Volumes: 6

Ah My Buddha, known in Japan as Amaenaide yo!! (あまえないでよっ!!; lit. 'Don't Act Spoiled!!'), is a Japanese manga series written and illustrated by Toshinori Sogabe that was serialized in Comic Gum magazine from March 25, 2004, to February 24, 2007. An anime adaptation aired on TV Tokyo's anime satellite channel, AT-X between July and September 2005. A second "season" of the manga, named: Amaenaideyo!! MS! was serialized from July 25, 2007, to August 22, 2009.

A second season of the anime, Amaenaide yo!! Katsu!! (あまえないでよっ!! 喝!!; lit. 'Don't Act Spoiled!! Victory!!'), aired between January and March 2006 and introduces a new antagonist, the fifteen-year-old girl Kazuki Kazusano, who is actually very affectionate to Ikkou, unlike the other girls. The second season is also more serious and dramatic than the last one, and focuses more on Hinata's unstable powers, Haruka's childhood years and Kazuki's tricks to get her hand on Ikkou's powers.

The show was broadcast in Japan with an R-15 rating, which is the Japanese equivalent of a "Restricted" rating. Media Blasters licensed and released both seasons of the anime in North America under the title Ah My Buddha (a title parody of the popular anime/manga Ah! My Goddess), first as six single bilingual DVD volumes throughout 2009, and then as a six-DVD collection in April 2010. Right Stuf Inc. has since rescued the series for a complete collection release under their Nozomi Entertainment label in 2014.

== Plot ==
The protagonist of the series is the monk-in-training Ikkou Satonaka, who transforms into a super-monk with the ability to perform mass exorcisms for the girls he lives with (Note: In the anime, he transforms from seeing a naked girl). He lives in the Saienji Temple as a Buddhist priest in training with six other nuns: Haruka Amanogawa, Sumi Ikuina, Hinata and Sakura Sugai, Chitose Nanbu and Yuuko Atouda, each of whom represents one of the bosatsu of the six lower realms of the traditional Buddhist cosmology. Chitose is the main love interest and has a love-hate relationship with Ikkou which is somewhat typical in many other anime, involving numerous misunderstandings, beatings, and angry tirades where the male is clearly at a disadvantage to the female. A side effect of Ikkou using his ultimate power is that immediately afterwards he turns into an even bigger pervert than he normally is. The subject matter of the series is Ikkou's self-destructive power and the powers of the other nuns and their training to control these powers, as well as their (mostly non-romantic) relationships.

== Characters ==
From left to right: Ikkou, Jotoku, Haruka, Chitose, Hinata, Sumi, Sakura, and Yuuko.

Ikkou Satonaka (里中 逸剛, Satonaka Ikkō)

- Voiced by: Chihiro Suzuki (Japanese); Bryce Papenbrook (English)

The main character of the series, Ikkou is able to release a powerful but uncontrollable power when confronted with intense lust. He is 16 years old. Each time, in the aftermath of his "awakening," he will bear a curse of lust, and will "attack" Chitose or the other nuns, who respond by running from him and attacking him. In some episodes he is struck by the other characters more than a half dozen times before the midway point of an episode (for instance, in episode one he was hit 21 times in the first five minutes.) Sometimes he brings it on himself, and sometimes he's the victim of misunderstanding. His character is, essentially, the center of slapstick. Ikkou seems not to enjoy his life at the temple (at least at the beginning of the series) and often complains that he is missing out on his youth. He seems not to have chosen the monastic life and resents the work given to him. He is also the least educated on Buddhist doctrine of all the characters in the show, excluding (possibly) those who are part of the laity. Indeed, he does not seem to have good grades in school nor does he seem to participate in any particular club at school, claiming that his duties at the temple prevent him from having enough time. However, while his fellow novices also have chores, they do not seem prevented from taking on school and hobbies. The head nun of Saienji (Jotoku) believes this is because he is lazy. In his defense, he does seem to be hired out for more temple errands than the other nuns, possibly because he is male and therefore stereotypically better suited to manual labor.
Chitose Nanbu (Red Hair) (南部 千歳, Nanbu Chitose)

- Voiced by: Mai Nakahara (Japanese); Cindy Robinson (English)

Represents the Human Realm, although she has a crush on Ikkou, she constantly denies it. She is 15 years old. Even though she acts nice much of the time, she fails to admit her crush to herself or Ikkou, often harming him when others flirt with him, overall a stereotypical tsundere. She is usually the first to put Ikkou down as low as possible at times as well as beat him with little provocation. She claims to have no hobbies initially, although she enjoys horror films. She is one of the characters in the series that is harassed by Yuuko for her large cup size, perhaps more frequently than the others. In early episodes there is a running gag to the question of where she used to live, one of the clues being that the entire towns businesses (post office, movie rental, clothing store, etc.) is located in one small two story building.
Yuuko Atouda (Blue Hair) (阿刀田 結子, Atōda Yūko)

- Voiced by: Chieko Higuchi (Japanese); Tara Platt (English)

Represents the Asura Realm, she is a tomboy and does not hesitate to join fights in her High School, she is the sole enemy of a High School Gang that has used Ikkou as a hostage. She is 15 years old. She tends to be jealous of girls that have big breasts compared to her own and angry with guys that prefer such girls, for example, when an underwear thief chose to steal underwear of only C-Cup and above, when she obviously is not a person with a C-Cup. She has no romantic attachments, and seems to think that she would need to change her personality to something more "girly" in order to have a successful romantic relationship with a male. Like most of the others she likes to physically hurt Ikkou on a daily basis, but unlike the others, her relationship with him is more a sibling bond than romance and she does not appear to have a crush on him.
Haruka Amanogawa (Blond Hair) (天川 春佳, Amanogawa Haruka)

- Voiced by: Akeno Watanabe (Japanese); Stephanie Sheh (English)

Represents the Devas Realm (Heaven Realm) is the most powerful exorcist of the group. (Excluding times when Ikkou awakened.) She is 17 years old. She flirts with Ikkou on more than one occasion to get a response only to sit back and watch when he gets beaten by the other girls. She has the biggest cup size of all the novice nuns. She seems to take most everything in good humor, and might even come off as a ditz. However, she might be more intelligent than she looks.
Sumi Ikuina (Brown Hair) (生稲 雛美, Ikuina Sumi)

- Voiced by: Tomoko Kawakami (Japanese); Karen Strassman (English)

Represents the Animal Realm. She is a kind girl who does not mind Ikkou and some times tries to defend him verbally only to fail and let him get beaten up. She is 16 years old. Her kindness extends even to animals, and this seems to be where her spiritual talents lie. In one second-season episode, she is chased by dogs and treated by them with excessive affection, apparently a side effect resulting from her lack of training. She is also sometimes harassed by Yuuko due to her breast size. Also due to her being of the Animal Realm, during a certain time each year she releases a pheromone that draws countless animals to her, though is later able to control this.
Hinata Sugai (Long Purple Hair) (為我井 陽, Sugai Hinata)

- Voiced by: Ryoko Shintani (Japanese); Sandra Edwards (English)

Represents the Naraka Realm (Hell Realm), has a little fire-spitting-demon pet by her side at all times that converts to a full sized demon when Hinata cannot suppress her Naraka bosatsu. She is 14 years old. Later in the series, when Ikkou is on the verge of awakening she often commands her demon to burn him, often successfully preventing him from awakening while others times it seems for the hell of it. She is Sakura's younger adopted sister. She appears very calm and rarely speaks. Her hobby is collecting and studying haniwa, and there is an episode in the second season devoted to the Haniwa Research Club which she joins - the school's smallest club. It is also hinted she has feelings for Ikkou, though unknown if it is like a brother or something more.
Sakura Sugai (Short Purple Hair) (為我井 さくら, Sugai Sakura)

- Voiced by: Haruhi Terada (Japanese); Mona Marshall (English)

Represents the Hungry Ghosts Realm, is the sister of Hinata, and has the incredible ability to eat anything without ever feeling satisfied and without changing her appearance. She is 16 years old. Also has some political skills, as she is the president of the student council of the High School the group attends. Her love of politics seems based in a joy of enforcing the rules. She also has her own internet site, "Dr. Sakura," where she berates she calls "hopeless" in what some might consider an attempt to help them - though she obviously gets a good deal of sadistic enjoyment out of ridiculing their complaints. (The anime suggests that she herself might qualify as a "hopeless" person). She seems to pull Ikkou into doing extra work for her own (or her sister's) convenience, or for the temple. All in all, she is a sadistic character, but she is not without concern for other people, and is especially attached to her younger sister, Hinata.
Jotoku Kawahara (河原 浄徳, Kawahara Jōtoku)

- Voiced by: Kazuko Sugiyama (Japanese); Mari Devon (English)

Head Monk of the Temple that the group resides in, grandmother to Ikkou, and Assistant Principal to the High School that the group attends. She is extremely strict to Ikkou more than anyone, though this is primarily because she believes him to be spoiled and lazy and does not train hard enough to keep himself from awakening. There have been occasions in the early part of the series where she has let an awakening or another infringement of temple policy go by unpunished, but by the end of the second season she seems to think she might have been too lax with him. She is generally firm with the nuns as well as Ikkou, though Ikkou seems to be the one most frequently in a position to be punished. She, like the other characters, strikes Ikkou repeatedly without remorse but she uses her staff. There seems to be some indication that in her youth Jotoku was a beauty (not only she claims this, but all the older monks around her still seem to think of her as attractive). In the brief points where she is portrayed young, we do not see her face, but she has long hair and even seems to be taller (Humans do actually shrink as they get older, the main cause of this is Osteoporosis. Animators often use this to the extreme for comical effect, making characters appear almost Chibi (term) in appearance. It's not unusual to see older characters in flash backs appearing much taller).
Kazuki Kazusano (上野 一希, Kazusano Kazuki)

- Voiced by: Asami Sanada (Japanese); Dorothy Elias-Fahn (English)

The main antagonist of the second season, her purpose is to awaken Ikkou so that she can release her innate and uncontrollable spiritual powers. Even though she has an antagonistic role in the series, in another sense she seems to be on Ikkou's side - that is, she seems to want to enjoy her youth as much as Ikkou does, and in much the same way - with a member of the opposite sex, and is also considered in a love triangle like situation with Ikkou and Chitose's relationship even though her feelings are known while Chitose hides them from even herself. She states that she wants to help him in developing his spiritual powers since they are the same age, although what she seems to consider "helping" is different from what the protagonists would consider helping. Since Ikkou's powers are dangerous, the nuns of Saienji hope for Ikkou to restrain himself from using his power too much, while Kazuki seems to believe that the very nature of his powers are essentially good and therefore incapable of doing harm. (The last episode of the series confirms that a strong, uncontrolled awakening can be warped into a force for evil, causing riots and the like.) Nonetheless, she does not seem to want to hurt Ikkou, and while her infatuation with him makes her forceful and competitive (even to the point of violence against Chitose), she is very determined and puts in strong effort to realize a goal that ought to be easier than it apparently is which is to be happy with Ikkou. Her catchphrase in Japanese is "mata joudo" (またじょうど).
Miyako Amanogawa (天川 京, Amanogawa Miyako)

- Voiced by: Kotono Mitsuishi (Japanese); Wendee Lee (English)

The chief priestess of Saichouji and older sister to Haruka. She has long black hair and is very beautiful and busty. She seems very understanding of Ikkou; her main role in the series is to help train Hinata and, perhaps, help Ikkou to train his spiritual powers. One might also say she uses him to help Hinata, though it does not seem to be without some benefit (or at least not detrimental) to his own spiritual journey. At one point she even indicated that she would not mind if Ikkou left his present temple to work at hers. Like her younger sister she is flirtatious and does not mind if Ikkou thinks anything perverted about her. She is shown in only a few episodes and is a relatively minor character.

== Media ==
=== Manga ===
Ah My Buddha / Amaenaideyo!! is written and illustrated by Sogabe Toshinori. It was serialized in Comic Gum magazine. Wani Books released the seven tankōbon of Amaenaideyo! between March 25, 2004, and February 24, 2007. Sharp Point Press released the seven tankōbon of Amaenaideyo! between January 7, 2005, and February 24, 2009. Soleil Productions released the first tankōbon of Amaenaideyo! on February 21, 2007. As of August 22, the last Amaenaideyo MS chapter with a grand finale was released.

Wani Books released the first volume of Amaenaideyo! MS on July 25, 2007. Sharp Point Press released the first volume of Amaenaideyo! MS on March 3, 2009.

=== Anime ===
Studio Deen produced an animated series based on the manga. The series, also titled Amenaideyo!!, was broadcast on AT-X between July 1, 2005, and September 16, 2005. It and sequel series Amaenaideyo!! Katsu!! are licensed by in North America by Media Blasters, who released them on bilingual DVD as a 26-episode series entitled Ah My Buddha. It is also licensed in Taiwan by Top-Insight International. Ah My Buddha uses two pieces of theme music. "Afurete yuku no wa kono kimochi" (あふれてゆくのはこの気持ち) by Amae-tai! is the series' opening theme, while "Happy Days" by Mai Nakahara is the series' ending theme.

The first DVD, containing the first two episodes of Amaenaideyo!!, was released by VAP on August 24, 2005. The second DVD, containing the third, fourth and fifth episodes of Amaenaideyo!!, was released by VAP on September 22, 2005. The third DVD, containing the sixth, seventh and eighth episodes of Amaenaideyo!!, was released by VAP on October 21, 2005. The fourth DVD, containing the ninth, tenth and eleventh episodes of Amaenaideyo!!, was released by VAP on November 23, 2005. The fifth DVD, containing the twelfth and the original video animation episodes of Amaenaideyo!!, was released by VAP on December 21, 2005.

The first three DVDs of Media Blasters' release of Ah My Buddha contain the first season of the TV series. The individual volumes were given the secondary titles The Aroused One (released on January 27, 2009), The Two Uncovered Paths (March 17, 2009) and The Three Exposed Jewels (June 30, 2009).

The second season, titled Amaenaideyo!! Katsu!!, was broadcast on AT-X between January 4, 2006, and March 22, 2006. It is also licensed in Taiwan by Top-Insight International. Amaenaideyo!! Katsu!! uses two pieces of theme music. "Amaenaideyotsu!!" (あまえないでよっ!!) by Amae-tai! is the series' opening theme, while "Lonesome Traveler" by Mai Nakahara is the series' ending theme.

The first DVD, containing the first two episodes of Amaenaideyo!! Katsu!!, was released on February 22, 2006. The second DVD, containing the third, fourth and fifth episodes of Amaenaideyo!! Katsu!!, was released on March 24, 2006. The third DVD, containing the sixth, seventh and eighth episodes of Amaenaideyo!! Katsu, was released on April 26, 2006. The fourth DVD, containing the ninth, tenth and eleventh episodes of Amaenaideyo!! Katsu, was released on May 24, 2006. The fifth DVD, containing the twelfth and the original video animation episodes of Amaenaideyo!! Katsu!!, was released on June 21, 2006.

The fourth through sixth DVDs of Media Blasters' release of Ah My Buddha contain the second season of the TV series. The individual volumes were given the secondary titles The Four Naked Truths (released on August 18, 2009), The Five Bare Aggregates (October 20, 2009) and The Six Realms Below (December 22, 2009).

The entire series was released on Blu-ray on March 2, 2021, from Nozomi Entertainment.

=== Animation Soundtrack CDs ===
On July 21, 2005, VAP released an animation soundtrack CD for Amaenaideyo!! using the lyrics of Toshiaki Yamada. It was sung by Mai Nakahara. On November 2, 2005, wint released a Christmas animation soundtrack CD for Amaenaideyo!!. It was sung by Akeno Watanabe, Mai Nakahara, Chieko Higuchi, Tomoko Kawakami, Ryoko Shintani and Haruhi Terada. On January 25, 2006, wint released an animation soundtrack CD for Amaenaideyo!! using the lyrics of Toshiaki Yamada. On March 15, 2006, wint released an animation soundtrack CD for Amaenaideyo!!. The songs were composed by Toshiaki Yamada and were sung by Ryoko Shintani, Chieko Higuchi, Tomoko Kawakami, Asami Sanada, Akeno Watanabe, Haruhi Terada and Mai Nakahara.

=== Drama Audio ===
Two Amaenaideyo Drama episodes (Episodes made just by sound effects and voices, usually put on CD's) were released on the Japanese DVD release at Volume 1 of both seasons. They were made to make the story more easy to understand, by adding stories about Ikkou's life.

The first audio drama, also named "Episode 00" starts as Ikkou is on a train. He's on his way to his grandmother, as it is his first time travelling to the Saienji temple. The girls welcomes him, and is very excited to have a boy at the temple for the first time. Well, everyone except Yuko. But the next day at the morning, Ikkou goes inside the bathroom when Sumi already is inside... And that makes them think twice about him.

The second audio drama is just added as a "bonus chapter" of Kazuki.

== Reception ==
T.H.E.M. Anime Reviews's Carlos Ross commends Ah My Buddha girls as being "very cute" but justifies his comment by criticising the premise of the anime for being "barely more clever than anything else in this genre, and in the end, it's simply another lame excuse for a "harem" to exist". Anime News Network's Theorin Martin commends Ah My Buddha for "Generally sharp coloring, occasional funny moment". But he criticises the anime for its "weak English dub, flat writing, insufficient fan service given its focus". Mania.com's Chris Beveridge commends the anime by saying, "It's a good sexy light hearted comedy with lots of good character designs, a solid sense of pacing and execution and a healthy dose of fun".
