= Chieko Higuchi =

Japanese actress (born 1981)

- 樋口 智恵子
- Born: January 30, 1981 (age 45); Mitaka, Tokyo, Japan
- Occupations: Actress; voice actress
- Years active: 1996–present
- Agent: Combination
- Height: 154 cm (5 ft 1 in)

Chieko Higuchi (樋口 智恵子, Higuchi Chieko; born January 30, 1981) is a Japanese actress and voice actress from Mitaka, Tokyo. She is in the two-person group "Whoops!!" with Maaya Sakamoto.

== Career ==
Higuchi made her debut in 1996, before she had finished high school, in Mizuiro Jidai, voicing the character of Takako Takahata. On February 5, 1997, she released an album Believe under the EMI label.

In 1998, Higuchi provided the voice of Princess Mimori in the series Kero Kero Chime, a story about Aoi, a schoolboy who is cursed by a wizard and told that if he wants to remove the curse he must find Mimori (the main female character in the 30-episode series). In 1999, she provided the voice of tomboy Shiho Nagaoka in the series To Heart. Higuchi also received her first film credit, voicing the main character of Marco in the film Marco: 3000 Leagues in Search of Mother.

In the summer of 2004, Higuchi released the albums Favorite Shoes, the Azumanga Daioh Character CD Series 4: Tomo Takino and Azumanga Daiō Kyarakutā Shīdī Shirīzu 4: Takino Tomo which after its release on July 24, 2004, ranked 80th in Oricon singles charts. On March 25, 2005, she released The Best of Rival Players XXIV Yohei Tanaka & Kohei Tanaka, which ranked 75th in the Oricon singles charts.

She voiced the character of Yūko Atoda in the 2005 series Ah My Buddha, playing another tomboy. She reprised voicing this character in the 2006 sequel, Amaenaideyo!! Katsu!!. Later in 2005, Higuchi voiced the character of Hibiki Watanuki in the TV Tokyo series Pani Poni Dash!, a parody which frequently references Japanese and American popular culture.

== Filmography ==
=== Anime television ===
- Mizuiro Jidai (1996), Takako Takahata
- Kero Kero Chime (1997), Mimori
- Beast Wars II: Super Life-Form Transformers (1998), Artemis
- To Heart (1999), Shiho Nagaoka
- Medabots (1999), Rintaro
- Transformers: Car Robots (2000), Ai-chan, Junko
- Comic Party (2001), Shiho
- Offside (2001), Nagisa Ito
- The Prince of Tennis (2001), Youhei Tanaka
- Azumanga Daioh (2002), Tomo Takino
- Whistle! (2002), Tsubasa Shiina
- Yu-Gi-Oh! Duel Monsters (2003), Kris
- To Heart: Remember My Memories (2004), Shiho Nagaoka
- Yu-Gi-Oh! Duel Monster GX (2004), Kohara
- Meine Liebe (2004), Erika
- Glass Mask (2005), Miki Tanuma (eps.41, 43)
- Ah My Buddha (2005), Yuko Atoda
- Pani Poni Dash! (2005), Hibiki Watanuki
- Eyeshield 21 (2005–2008), Juri Sawai
- Amaenaideyo!! Katsu!! (2006), Yuko Atoda
- Gin'yuu Mokushiroku Meine Liebe ~Wieder~ (2006), Erika
- Princess Princess (2006), Sayaka
- Yu-Gi-Oh! 5D's (2008), Angela

=== OVA ===
- Hunter × Hunter: Greed Island (2003), Biscuit Krueger

=== Film ===
- Marco: 3000 Leagues in Search of Mother (1999), Marco
- Azumanga Daioh: The Very Short Movie (2001), Tomo Takino

=== Video games ===
- Super Robot Wars Alpha 3 (2005), Fei Yen the Knight
- Naruto: Uzumaki Chronicles 2 (2006), Meno
- Phoenix Wright: Ace Attorney − Spirit of Justice (2016), Minuki Naruhodo

== Discography ==
- "Dennou Senki Virtual On 'CyberNet Rhapsody'" (1996) a Virtual On drama CD, acting and singing as Fei-Yen Kn.
- "Believe" (February 5, 1997, EMI Music Japan)
- "Favorite Shoes" (大好きなシューズ, Daisuki na Shūzu) (June 21, 2004)
- "Azumanga Daioh Character CD Series 4: Tomo Takino" (｢あずまんが大王｣キャラクターCDシリーズ④ 滝野智, Azumanga Daiō Kyarakutā Shīdī Shirīzu 4: Takino Tomo) (July 24, 2004, Lantis), image song single of the eponymous character ranked 80th in Oricon singles charts.
- "The Best of Rival Players XXIV Yohei Tanaka & Kohei Tanaka" (March 24, 2005), ranked 75th in Oricon singles charts.

With Maaya Sakamoto as "Whoops!!" :

- "Love Love Phantasy" (January 20, 1999)
- "ジーニー" (June 17, 1999)
- P (July 16, 1999)
- P' (March 10, 2006)
