= Yankee JK Kuzuhana-chan =

Japanese manga series

- First tankōbon volume cover

ヤンキーJKクズハナちゃん
- Genre: Harem; Romantic comedy
- Manga
- Written by: Toshinori Sogabe
- Published by: Akita Shoten
- Imprint: Shōnen Champion Comics
- Magazine: Weekly Shōnen Champion
- Original run: March 19, 2020 – present
- Volumes: 33
- Manga

Yankee JK Kuzuhana-chan: Another Side of Heroine
- Written by: Kurara Hashimoto
- Published by: Akita Shoten
- Imprint: Shōnen Champion Comics
- Magazine: Champion Cross
- Original run: October 23, 2024 – present
- Volumes: 4
- icon

Yankee JK Kuzuhana-chan (ヤンキーJKクズハナちゃん; 'Yankee High School Girl Kuzuhana') is a Japanese manga series written and illustrated by Toshinori Sogabe. It has been serialized in Akita Shoten's shōnen manga magazine Weekly Shōnen Champion since March 2020.

== Plot ==
Hodaka Saotome is a first-year student at Moteshiro Prefectural School. The school, which had just become a co-ed school, currently has 360 students, with him being the only male student. Initially finding himself out of place, he meets Hanako Kuzuryū, a delinquent student with a rough attitude, on the school rooftop. As time goes on, he discovers Hanako's true personality and the two become close friends, while also becoming the object of attention of the school body.

== Characters ==
Hodaka Saotome (早乙女 穂高, Saotome Hodaka)
The only male student at Moteshiro Prefectural School. His family runs a clothing business. He enrolled at the school due to its fashion program. Because he is the school's only male student, several students develop feelings for him. He initially felt out of place and even considered dropping out, but changes his outlook after befriending Hanako. Later in the story, he reluctantly runs for student council president upon the urging of the others, although much to his relief, he loses to Kasumi.
Hanako Kuzuryū (九頭竜 華子, Kuzuryū Hanako)
A student at Moteshiro Prefectural School, notorious for delinquent demeanor and rough attitude. Her demeanor, combined with her physical strength and loner personality, led to others avoiding her. After Hodaka befriends her, she changes her outlook in life and becomes friendly towards others in school. She is skilled in martial arts, having been trained by her mother. She is nicknamed Kuzuhana (クズハナ), a name she dislikes due to the negative connotation of the word "kuzu".
Kasumi Takae (鷹江 花澄, Takae Kasumi)
The class representative of Hodaka's class. She has long black hair and is an intelligent student. Like others in school, she developed feelings for Hodaka. Despite being the class representative, she actually has a bold personality. Later in the story, she runs for student council president and wins, although she often seeks advice and help from him.
Yuna Ushigome (牛込 優菜, Ushigome Yuna)
A cheerful girl with short twintailed hair. She often nicknames people, including Hodaka, with the suffix "-chi". She develops feelings for Hodaka after he saves her from a sugar daddy.
Mai Kamogawa (鴨川 舞衣, Kamogawa Mai)
A short-haired girl who is a member of the school cheerleading squad.
Madoka Tsuruhashi (鶴橋 円佳, Tsuruhashi Madoka)
A student who had only recently moved back into town. She was childhood friends with Hodaka, with him visiting her family's okonomiyaki restaurant, but lost contact after the restaurant closed down. She is skilled in cooking. She was born Madoka Kōno (河野 円佳, Kōno Madoka), but changed her surname after her parents' divorce. She is currently living with her grandmother.

== Publication ==
Written and illustrated by Toshinori Sogabe, Yankee JK Kuzuhana-chan debuted as a one-shot in Akita Shoten's shōnen manga magazine Weekly Shōnen Champion on October 31, 2019; it began publication as a serialized manga in the same magazine on March 19, 2020. Akita Shoten has collected its chapters into individual tankōbon volumes. The first volume was released on August 6, 2020. As of October 7, 2026, 33 volumes have been released.

A spin-off manga by Kurara Hashimoto, titled Yankee JK Kuzuhana-chan: Another Side of Heroine (ヤンキーJKクズハナちゃん アナザー・サイド・オブ・ヒロイン), started on Akita Shoten's Champion Cross online platform on October 23, 2024. The first volume was released on June 6, 2025. As of October 7, 2026, four volumes have been released.

=== Volumes ===
==== Yankee JK Kuzuhana-chan ====
No.	Release date	ISBN
1	August 6, 2020	978-4-253-22507-6
2	October 8, 2020	978-4-253-22509-0
3	December 8, 2020	978-4-253-22510-6
4	March 8, 2021	978-4-253-22512-0
5	May 7, 2021	978-4-253-22513-7
6	July 8, 2021	978-4-253-22628-8
7	October 8, 2021	978-4-253-22632-5
8	December 8, 2021	978-4-253-22633-2
9	February 8, 2022	978-4-253-22634-9
10	May 6, 2022	978-4-253-22635-6
11	June 8, 2022	978-4-253-22655-4
12	August 8, 2022	978-4-253-22665-3
13	November 8, 2022	978-4-253-22868-8
14	January 6, 2023	978-4-253-22869-5
15	March 8, 2023	978-4-253-22870-1
16	May 8, 2023	978-4-253-28401-1
17	July 6, 2023	978-4-253-28402-8
18	October 6, 2023	978-4-253-28403-5
19	November 8, 2023	978-4-253-28404-2
20	February 7, 2024	978-4-253-28405-9
21	April 8, 2024	978-4-253-28406-6
22	June 7, 2024	978-4-253-28407-3
23	August 7, 2024	978-4-253-28408-0
24	October 8, 2024	978-4-253-28409-7
25	March 7, 2025	978-4-253-28410-3
26	June 6, 2025	978-4-253-28411-0
27	September 8, 2025	978-4-253-00301-8
28	November 7, 2025	978-4-253-00494-7
29	January 8, 2026	978-4-253-00968-3
30	March 6, 2026	978-4-253-01193-8
31	June 8, 2026	978-4-253-01387-1
32	August 6, 2026	978-4-253-01867-8
33	October 7, 2026	978-4-253-02002-2

==== Yankee JK Kuzuhana-chan: Another Side of Heroine ====
No.	Release date	ISBN
1	June 6, 2025	978-4-253-29549-9
2	September 8, 2025	978-4-253-00386-5
3	March 6, 2026	978-4-253-01218-8
4	October 7, 2026	978-4-253-02021-3
