= List of Shakugan no Shana light novels =

The cover of the first volume of the Shakugan no Shana light novel series released by Dengeki Bunko.

Shakugan no Shana is a Japanese light novel series written by Yashichiro Takahashi with accompanying illustrations drawn by Noizi Ito. The series follows Yuji Sakai, an ordinary Japanese high school boy who inadvertently becomes involved in a perpetual war between forces of balance and imbalance in existence. In the process, he befriends the title character: a fighter for the balancing force, whom he takes to calling "Shana". The series covers 27 novels published between November 9, 2002, and November 10, 2023, under ASCII Media Works' Dengeki Bunko imprint. Viz Media once published the first two volumes in English, although the rights to the series have been dropped, thus leaving them out of print.

== Volume list ==
=== Main series ===
No.	Title	Original release date	English release date
01	Shakugan no Shana: The Girl With Fire in Her Eyes; Shakugan no Shana (灼眼のシャナ)	November 9, 2002; 978-4-8402-2218-1	April 17, 2007; 978-1-4215-1193-1
02	Shakugan no Shana: Fight Day! Shakugan no Shana II (灼眼のシャナII)	April 10, 2003; 978-4-8402-2321-8	October 16, 2007; 978-1-4215-1194-8
03	Shakugan no Shana III (灼眼のシャナIII)	July 10, 2003; 978-4-8402-2410-9	—
04	Shakugan no Shana IV (灼眼のシャナIV)	August 9, 2003; 978-4-8402-2439-0	—
05	Shakugan no Shana V (灼眼のシャナV)	November 10, 2003; 978-4-8402-2519-9	—
06	Shakugan no Shana VI (灼眼のシャナVI)	February 10, 2004; 978-4-8402-2608-0	—
07	Shakugan no Shana VII (灼眼のシャナVII)	July 10, 2004; 978-4-8402-2725-4	—
08	Shakugan no Shana VIII (灼眼のシャナVIII)	October 10, 2004; 978-4-8402-2833-6	—
09	Shakugan no Shana IX (灼眼のシャナIX)	February 10, 2005; 978-4-8402-2881-7	—
10	Shakugan no Shana X (灼眼のシャナX)	September 10, 2005; 978-4-8402-3142-8	—
11	Shakugan no Shana XI (灼眼のシャナXI)	November 10, 2005; 978-4-8402-3204-3	—
12	Shakugan no Shana XII (灼眼のシャナXII)	February 10, 2006; 978-4-8402-3304-0	—
13	Shakugan no Shana XIII (灼眼のシャナXIII)	September 10, 2006; 978-4-8402-3549-5	—
14	Shakugan no Shana XIV (灼眼のシャナXIV)	February 10, 2007; 978-4-8402-3719-2	—
15	Shakugan no Shana XV (灼眼のシャナXV)	August 10, 2007; 978-4-8402-3929-5	—
16	Shakugan no Shana XVI (灼眼のシャナXVI)	November 10, 2007; 978-4-8402-4061-1	—
17	Shakugan no Shana XVII (灼眼のシャナXVII)	November 10, 2008; 978-4-0486-7341-9	—
18	Shakugan no Shana XVIII (灼眼のシャナXVIII)	February 10, 2009; 978-4-0486-7521-5	—
19	Shakugan no Shana XIX (灼眼のシャナXIX)	September 10, 2009; 978-4-0486-8007-3	—
20	Shakugan no Shana XX (灼眼のシャナXX)	April 10, 2010; 978-4-0486-8451-4	—
21	Shakugan no Shana XXI (灼眼のシャナXXI)	November 10, 2010; 978-4-0487-0050-4	—
22	Shakugan no Shana XXII (灼眼のシャナXXII)	October 10, 2011; 978-4-0487-0960-6	—

=== Short story collections ===
No.	Title	Japanese release date	Japanese ISBN
1	Shakugan no Shana 0 (灼眼のシャナ0)	June 10, 2005	978-4-8402-3050-6
"Overture" (オーバーチュア); "Shakugan no Shana" (しゃくがんのしゃな); "Cinderella no Shana" (しんでれらのしゃな)
2	Shakugan no Shana S (灼眼のシャナS)	June 10, 2006	978-4-8402-3442-9
"Keepsake" (キープセイク); "Milestone" (マイルストーン); "Ceremony" (セレモニー)
3	Shakugan no Shana SII (灼眼のシャナSII)	June 10, 2008	978-4-0486-7085-2
"Domicile" (ドミサイル); "Zoetrope" (ゾートロープ); "Yawning" (ヤーニング)
4	Shakugan no Shana SIII (灼眼のシャナSIII)	November 10, 2012	978-4-04-891085-9
"Solo" (ソロー); "Verger" (ヴァージャー); "Future & Hope" (フューチャー&ホープ)
5	Shakugan no Shana SIV (灼眼のシャナSIV)	November 10, 2023	978-4-04-915272-2
"Grasp" (グラスプ); "Tangency" (タンジェンシ); "Amphitheater" (アンフィシアタ); "Lucky Clothes" (勝負服); "Quiddity" (クイディティ); "Dressing Well" (着こなし); "Locus" (ローカス)
