= Toshinori Sogabe =

Japanese manga artist (born 1975)

Toshinori Sogabe (宗我部 としのり, Sogabe Toshinori; born May 5, 1975) is a Japanese manga artist best known as the creator of Amaenaideyo!!, which was adapted into an anime television series and distributed in the US under the title Ah My Buddha, and for the Young King magazine series Go! Tenba Cheerleaders!.

Toshinori also provided artwork for the Comic Rush manga Orange Delivery, which was written by Bohemian K.-->

== Works ==
- Ah My Buddha (story and art)
- Deban desu yo? Kondō-san! (story and art)
- Go! Tenba Cheerleaders (story and art)
- Haruka Suitact! (story and art)
- Kurogane Hime (story)
- Orange Delivery (art)
- Mizutama Rindō (story)
- Yankee JK Kuzuhana-chan (story and art)
