= Comic Gum =

Japanese manga magazine

- Categories: Seinen manga
- Frequency: Monthly
- Publisher: Wani Books
- First issue: 1996
- Final issue: July 2015 (print)
- Country: Japan
- Based in: Tokyo
- Language: Japanese
- Website: www.comicgum.com

Comic Gum (コミックガム) is a Japanese seinen manga magazine that was published on a monthly basis by Wani Books between 1996 and 2015.

Unlike other Japanese magazines, Comic Gum rarely contains posters or pin-up pictures. However, a special gift is given away together with each issue, which is related to one of the series featured in the magazine. That includes Special DVDs, Trading Cards or Drama CDs.

Its main readership is men 18 years and up.

== Manga serialized ==
- 99 (Ninetynine)
- Ah My Buddha
- Aika Zero
- Ashiarai
- Because I'm the Goddess
- The Candidate for Goddess
- Deep Forest
- Emuyon
- Fight Ippatsu! Jūden-chan!!
- Heavens Gate
- Hibi kore hai boku
- Iincho
- Ikki Tousen
- Kikokeso
- Kita e. ~Diamond Dust Drops~
- Koe de Oshigoto!
- Magallanica
- Mahoromatic
- Mekuri Mekuru
- Nobunaga!
- Otogi Matsuri: Dark Offering
- Saito-Kun Wa Esper Rashii
- Tetragrammaton Labyrinth
- Tsukuyomi: Moon Phase
- Tokyo Little Gunners
- U~min
