= Wani Books =

Japanese publishing company

Wani Books Co., Ltd.
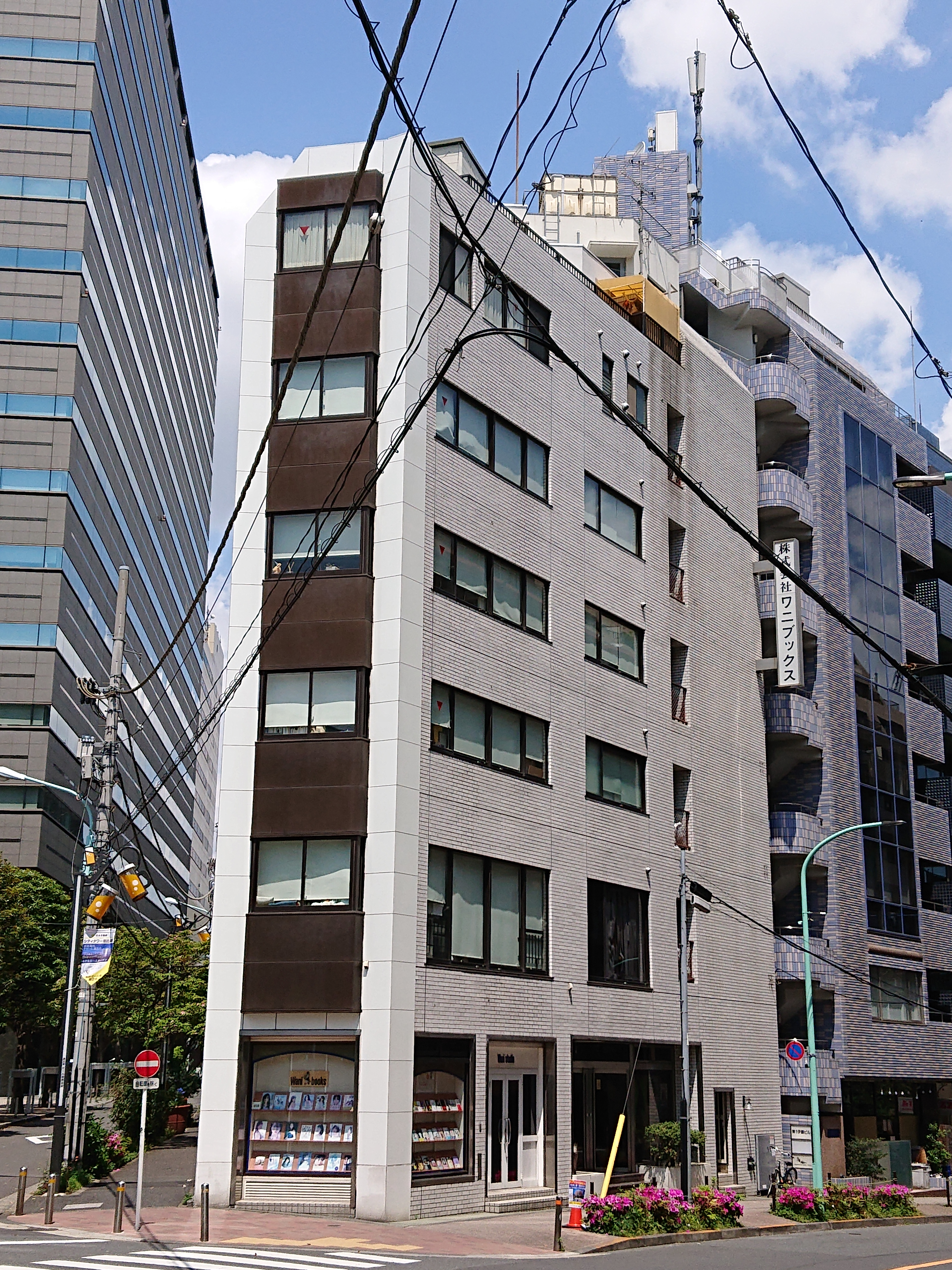
- Headquarters in Shibuya, Tokyo
- Native name: 株式会社ワニブックス
- Romanized name: Kabushiki gaisha Wani Bukkusu
- Type: Kabushiki gaisha
- Industry: Publishing
- Founded: November 1979
- Founder: Junzō Iwase
- Headquarters: Ebisu, Shibuya, Tokyo, Japan
- Key people: Akio Takahashi (president)
- Products: Books, magazines, manga
- Parent: Kodansha
- Website: www.wani.co.jp

Wani Books Co., Ltd. (ワニブックス株式会社, Wani Bukkusu Kabushiki Gaisha) is a Japanese publishing company focused on manga-related publication, including magazines and books. The company was established in November 1979. It publishes a manga magazine called Comic Gum.

In March 2007, Yoshimoto Books Co., Ltd. was established in collaboration with Yoshimoto Kogyo Co., Ltd., and Comic Yoshimoto was launched. In 2009, Wani Plus Co., Ltd. was established as an affiliate company.

In 2024, the company became a wholly owned subsidiary of Kodansha.

== Magazines published ==
Wink Up (ウインク アップ, uinku appu) is an idol magazine published since July 1988.

UP to boy (アップトゥボーイ, apputubōi), abbreviated as UTB, is a bimonthly idol magazine published since 1986.

COOLTRANS (クール・トランス, kūru toreansu) was a street fashion magazine published from 1995 to 2013

+act (プラスアクト, Purasu Akuto) is a bimonthly magazine since 2004 featuring high-quality photography and in-depth features, often highlighting figures from film, television, and music.

Comic Gum (コミックガム) is a monthly seinen manga magazine started in 1996.
