= List of Peacemaker Kurogane episodes =

Peacemaker Kurogane
- English DVD of Peacemaker Kurogane
- Native name
- Kanji: PEACE MAKER鐵
- Revised Hepburn: Pīsu Meikā Kurogane
- No. of episodes: 24

Release
- Original network: TV Asahi; TV Kanagawa
- Original release: October 7, 2003 – March 24, 2004

The episodes of Peacemaker Kurogane anime series are based on the manga written by Nanae Chrono. The anime series was made by Gonzo Digimation. Its 24 episodes were broadcast on TV Asahi between October 7, 2003, and March 24, 2004.

The US license for the anime is held by ADV Films under the title Peacemaker. The anime follows the plot of the manga mostly, but also introduces characters that are only shown in the sequel of the story. The anime aired in the United States on Showtime Beyond, alongside Chrono Crusade. The anime was broadcast in France by Déclic-Images. It was broadcast in Spain by Buzz Channel. It was broadcast in Saudi Arabia by space power, in the Philippines by QTV and Hero

The anime uses two pieces of theme music. The opening theme is "You Gonna Feel" by Hav while the ending theme is "Hey Jimmy!" by Hav.

Gonzo Digimation released the anime's seven DVDs between December 21, 2003, and June 25, 2004. Gonzo Digimation released the DVD box set, containing all 7 DVDs, on December 22, 2004. ADV Films released the anime's seven DVDs between September 14, 2004, and September 13, 2005. ADV Films released the DVD box set, containing all 7 DVDs, on November 15, 2005.

== Episode list ==
| No. | Title | Original release date |
|---|---|---|
| 1 | "Cherry Blossoms"; Transliteration: "Sakura" (Japanese: 桜) | October 7, 2003 |
Tetsunosuke Ichimura wants to enroll in the Shinsengumi, but his older brother Tatsunosuke Ichimura, who works as a bookkeeper, says he is too young to join. Sōji Okita, the first unit captain, invites Tetsu to spar with him in front of Isami Kondō, the commander. Tetsu soon performs a double-sword technique, but Okita easily overpowers him. Toshizō Hijikata, the second vice commander, is against Tetsu joining the Shinsengumi, despite Kondō's approval. Later that night, Tetsu is traumatized when Hijikata slaughters a group of ronin who were sent after him.
| 2 | "Will"; Transliteration: "Kokorozashi" (Japanese: 志) | October 14, 2003 |
Outside the dojo during a downpour, Tetsu recalls when Okita questioned if he were to abandon his humanity in order to avenge someone. Hijikata accepts Tetsu as part of the Shinsengumi, as the rain begins to let up. Ayumu Yamazaki, the housekeeper, is complimented by Tetsu on her delicious cooking. Tetsu is then introduced to Sanosuke Harada and Shinpachi Nagakura, the tenth and second unit captains, respectively. Tetsu is reluctant to find out that he must serve as a page under Hijikata. Susumu Yamazaki, the watcher, reports to Hijikata concerning the Chōshū clan, responsible for leading a revolution against the Shogunate. Tetsu wishes to become a watcher instead of a page, becoming jealous of Susumu.
| 3 | "Crimson"; Transliteration: "Kurenai" (Japanese: 紅) | October 21, 2003 |
Susumu, disguised as a geisha, finds out that Tetsu was following him around in the streets. Sanosuke and Shinpachi take on two ronin, while Tetsu and Okita rescue a mute girl held in captivity, however Okita is subsequently attacked by a third ronin. Hijikata, from the information gathered from Susumu, deduces that the Chōshū clan is behind this matter. It is noticed that Okita had killed the third ronin in an act to protect Tetsu. Okita explains the code of the Shinsengumi, in which one must commit seppuku if the code is broken. Tetsu understands that he was assigned as a page to order to avoid having to live by this code.
| 4 | "Shadow"; Transliteration: "Kage" (Japanese: 影) | October 28, 2003 |
Susumu hears word of a wildfire that occurred the previous night concurrent to when a noodle vendor was murdered in the streets. Tetsu abandon his chores and spars with Sanosuke and Shinpachi, all before the arrival of Heisuke Tōdō, the eighth unit captain, who is ecstatic upon meeting Tetsu for the first time. Hijikata knows that Toshimaro Yoshida, the leader of the Chōshū clan, is responsible for the murders and wildfires that have occurred recently. Hajime Saitō, the third unit captain, is able to sense a dark spiritual aura from within Tetsu. Saitō encounters a group of zombies while roaming the streets at night. Susumu, disguised as a ninja, attacks and prevents a sorcerer named Kamuzune Furube from resurrecting the zombies.
| 5 | "Moon"; Transliteration: "Tsuki" (Japanese: 月) | November 4, 2003 |
Keisuke Yamanami, the first vice commander, comes by for a visit and meets Tetsu, who favors him over Hijikata. Tetsu, while running an errand of picking up groceries for Ayumu, chances upon the mute girl from before, shyly revealing her name as Saya. He reminisces of when his father had told him that throwing a coin at the saisen from a greater distance would increase the chance of having his wishes granted. Saya then mentions that her parents were murdered, to which Tetsu empathizes the thought of the matter. However, Saya runs away in tears after Tetsu swears to avenge the deaths of his parents. Though Yamanami believes that Tetsu should remain as a page, Kondō considers that Tetsu should have his own sword and uniform.
| 6 | "Warrior"; Transliteration: "Bu" (Japanese: 武) | November 11, 2003 |
While Hijikata is away on a mission, Tetsu seems rather depressed, aside from a martial arts competition is underway. During a footrace outside, in which Shinpachi takes the lead, Okita finds Tetsu inside the dojo, and the two decide to spar against each other. When Tetsu asks Okita the reason why one takes up the sword to become stronger, Okita responds by saying that reason may differ for each person, whether silly or terrible, though Tetsu falls asleep when this was said. Yamanami wins the footrace by using abacuses as roller skates, being awarded a pot of rice as the prize. Okita invites a group of children for the melee competition in the afternoon. Saya, among the children, comes to apologize to Tetsu, and the two then reconcile. Tetsu says that even though he will have his worries, he promises not to sadden Saya while dedicating himself to become stronger.
| 7 | "Suzu"; Transliteration: "Suzu" (Japanese: 鈴) | November 18, 2003 |
While Tetsu goes shopping with Tatsu at a marketplace, Tetsu slips away to a sword shop, where he witnesses a customer purchasing a sword. When Tetsu comes across a short sword, a white-haired boy, later recognized as Suzu Kitamura, tries to grab for it as well. The two stir up commotion from outside, and the customer becomes irritated. Reluctantly, Tatsu subdues both Tetsu and Suzu, repeatedly begging the customer for forgiveness of their behavior. After the customer leaves the shop, Suzu departs shortly thereafter. Though Hijikata is upset that the martial arts competition took place during his leave, Kondō recalls to him of how and when the Shinsengumi was first established. Suzu, serving as a page under Yoshida, is told that he would be distracted in combat if he ponders who he will truly become. Tetsu is desperate to have his own sword, but Hijikata declines the request. However, when Okita talks with Hijikata, it is implied that the former had received his sword at nine years old, seemingly as a regretful mistake. Susumu comes across three female ronin, evading them by jumping into a riverbank from a bridge.
| 8 | "Love"; Transliteration: "Koi" (Japanese: 恋) | November 25, 2003 |
Susumu, ashamed to be a watcher, has his wounded shoulder treated by Ayumu. Tetsu, after being teased when breaking a long bamboo sword, accidentally throws the hilt of the sword at Kondō, however the latter lets him off easily and sends him to buy some brown sugar candy. When at the marketplace, Tetsu sees Saya with an outspoken girl named Hana. Tetsu and Saya pay their respects at the shrine, throwing coins at the saisen, while Hana watches in amazement. Later on, they attend a festival, where they decide to make Tetsu play the ring toss. Tetsu is pressured in either getting Saya a piglet plushie or Hana a red hairpin. Nevertheless, as he tosses a bunch of rings, he ends up winning a dagger. Hana shares with Tetsu that her father, being a ronin as an umbrella maker, stopped selling his swords after her mother had died from illness. After Hana retrieves some ginger ale, she runs into trouble with three men, but Sanosuke and Shinpachi comes to the rescue, as Tetsu and Saya view from the sidelines. Hana develops a crush on Sanosuke, and Tetsu gives away his dagger.
| 9 | "Dragon"; Transliteration: "Ryū" (Japanese: 竜) | December 2, 2003 |
Tetsu, accompanied by Tatsu, is sent without warning to go at a harbor to pick up a package for Hijikata. Tetsu spots Suzu on the way, chasing him to a brook. The two follow the brook to make their way to the harbor. Tetsu catches up to Tatsu, who was worried sick about him, and Suzu takes his leave. After stopping for lunch, Tetsu encounters a mysterious man and trails him into a forest, where a group of thugs appears before him, and Tatsu discreetly comes as well. The man throws a hat towards Tetsu, while simultaneously shooting one of the thugs and breaking their sword. After defeating the other thugs, the man shows Tetsu and Tatsu two ships docked at a naval base where he is among two hundred soldiers in combat training.
| 10 | "Quiet"; Transliteration: "Yū" (Japanese: 幽) | December 9, 2003 |
Yamanami is reminded of when he used to watch Hijikata practice the same way he does currently. Yamanami wants Hijikata to demote him to a bookkeeper, since he wants to refrain from causing bloodshed any longer. He remembers when he assassinated the former commander of the Shinsengumi, when he and Hijikata were once ronin. Tetsu delivers the package to Hijikata, unaware of its contents. Hijikata reveals to Okita that it contains medicine to help restore physical vigor. Hijikata and Okita are reported that a patrol group was attacked by some ronin at a riverbank. Yamanami and Saitō tag along behind them, only to see that Furube has summoned a giant warrior demon to attack Hijikata. Saitō manages to cause Furube to withdraw from the attack, and explains that he is a master of esoteric incantations.
| 11 | "Plot"; Transliteration: "Ki" (Japanese: 企) | December 16, 2003 |
Tetsu, after being told by Tatsu to air out some old books, is given a handful of sweets from Okita. After Tatsu spills some books when briefly bumping into Yamanami, the mysterious man suddenly shows up. Revealed to be Ryōma Sakamoto, he refers to Tatsu as one of "the peacemaker's sons". Okita tells his unit to capture Ryōma, for he is a wanted criminal, however Ryōma ends up evading after shooting a few men from Okita's unit. Tatsu is explained that Ryōma abandoned his clan and has revolted against the loyalists. A girl named Hotaru, implied to have a crush on Okita, has come to assist Ayumu in the kitchen. What Okita does not know is that she is really spy working for the Chōshū clan. At night, Hotaru gathers old papers from Okita's room, but she almost gets in trouble with Ayumu. The next morning, the papers are not accepted, and Hotaru requests to resign as a spy.
| 12 | "Big Brother"; Transliteration: "Ani" (Japanese: 兄) | December 23, 2003 |
As Tetsu is hanging up sheets to dry outside the dojo, he sees someone that resembles Saya. Saitō, when wanting to spar with him, senses that Tetsu is distracted by someone in the past on his mind, one who is still living and not dead. Saitō then feels as if being surrounded in flames when Tetsu attempts to land a blow, resulting in the latter being knocked out by the former. Yamanami and Heisuke later bring Tetsu to an okiya, where he meets a courtesan named Akesato. Tatsu, however, is against this course of action and decides to track them down. Tetsu is surprised to see not only Hana, but also Saya residing in the okiya.
| 13 | "Gaze"; Transliteration: "Madashi" (Japanese: 眼) | January 6, 2004 |
Suzu, sent by Yoshida to talk to Akesato to discuss about future plans, is halted by Hana, who tells him that Akesato has a prior appointment. He later stumbles into Tetsu, much to the chagrins of each other. Akesato tells Yamanami that Saya will live the life of a courtesan to soon be bound with a patron. Tetsu and Suzu are unaware that they are both serving under an authority as a page. Even though they have opposite opinions of who they serve, Suzu believes that this person is actually looking after Tetsu as a favor from someone. Yamanami and Heisuke scare away some patrons who were harassing Akesato. A fretful Tatsu is glad to see Tetsu once again. Saitō tells Suzu to exit the room as he points directly at Tetsu and gives a gloomy stare.
| 14 | "Thoughts"; Transliteration: "Omoi" (Japanese: 想) | January 13, 2004 |
A concerned Okita sympathizes with Tatsu for him having to stress about the death of his parents. Tatsu has vowed to raise Tetsu into a responsible person. What bothers Tatsu, however, is why Hijikata reacted so gravely the previous day at the okiya. Susumu, guilty for failing his mission, attempts to commit seppuku, but Ayumu talks him out of it. Akesato encourages Saya to be herself and follow her heart. Tetsu refuses to eat all day, due to the events that occurred the previous day. He finds Ayumu at night, and he gives in to finally eating something. She advises him to be honest with himself and not dwell over complicate matters. When Tetsu describes her as a big sister, Ayumu tearfully says that he should befriend Susumu to bring upon inspiration.
| 15 | "Poetry"; Transliteration: "Uta" (Japanese: 歌) | January 20, 2004 |
As Tetsu gets back into the swing of things, Okita shows him a collection of humorous haiku to help cheer him up. Unfortunately, the haiku actually belongs to Hijikata, who stands at nothing to retrieve it back from Tetsu. Ryōma then appears and does a footrace against Hijikata to prevent Tetsu from being chased. After Tetsu shows Sanosuke and Shinpachi the haiku, Hijikata begins to pursue them, but he trips over a vegetable. While Sanosuke and Shinpachi are exhausted from being tailed, Tetsu scurries to give Okita back the haiku, but Okita tells Tetsu to hold onto it for a while longer. Tetsu runs toward Tatsu as Hijikata approaches, yet Tatsu hands over the haiku with no hesitation at all. Tatsu thanks Okita for enlightening Tetsu by somehow orchestrating the chase, even though Hijikata was earnest on the matter. It is also seen that the haiku that was given back to Hijikata was a fake made by Okita.
| 16 | "Deceit"; Transliteration: "Itsuwari" (Japanese: 偽) | January 27, 2004 |
Tetsu has shown improvement when sparring against Heisuke. Okita has noticed how much Tatsu worries for his little brother. Ryōma comes to see Yoshida to convince him not to start a revolt against the Shogunate, but to no avail. Hotaru finds someone resembling Okita in the streets. Tatsu later bumps into Ryōma, only to be surrounded by patrons. The two escape via a wheelbarrow and end up at the riverbank. Hotaru, unaware of who she is talking to, begins to wonder what Okita is really like. Later at night, the Okita duplicate, revealed to be Kichisaburo, murders the group of patrons, which pleases his master Seiga no Chujo.
| 17 | "Hollow"; Transliteration: "Utsuro" (Japanese: 虚) | February 3, 2004 |
Even though there are witnesses who have seen Okita slaughter a group of patrons early last night, Hijikata knew that Okita had spent time with him last night, saying that this serial killer is an impostor. Okita finds Hotaru in the streets to tell her about this impostor. The following night, Hijikata has a run in with Kichisaburo, and Saitō arrives to intervene. Kichisaburo falls back to Seiga no Chujo, who wishes have his body taken to set the Imperial Palace on fire. Hijikata, Okita and Saitō, upon striking a mystic cat spirit, are transported to the Gate of Obstruction, where the only way out is to locate the Gate of Life. Hotaru, trying to find them, starts to peel off incantation seals created by Furube, which destroys his demon warrior spirit that was summoned. When Seiga no Chujo randomly start shooting fire arrows at the three, Saitō reflects them back at Seiga no Chujo, who shields Kichisaburo from getting burned, thereby sacrificing himself. After the three thank Hotaru for peeling off the incantation seals, it is noted that all were aware that she was a spy sent by the Chōshū clan.
| 18 | "Rain"; Transliteration: "Ame" (Japanese: 雨) | February 10, 2004 |
During a downpour, Tetsu confronts Susumu concerning the whereabouts of Ayumu, though it seems that Susumu could not care less about this. Hijikata ponders if the ronin attack the Shinsengumi out of fear or out of malice. At the okiya, Yamanami and Akesato decide to take a walk outside to mention about Tetsu's depression and Ayumu's absence. Yamanami also tells Akesato that he is lonely without her when they are in their separate residences. Meanwhile, Saya lays Tetsu's head on her lap to comfort him. Elsewhere, Ayumu, acting as a hairdresser, is caught by Masuya for being a watcher sent to gather information on Chōshū clan, wounding his arm with a blade as an attempt to murder him.
| 19 | "Sky"; Transliteration: "Sora" (Japanese: 空) | February 17, 2004 |
Tetsu discloses to Susumu that Ayumu is in trouble, despite how Susumu feels indifferent about her. Tetsu tells Susumu that Ayumu told him to take care of her little brother. Susumu finds Ayumu beaten up outside on the ground, seeing that he has come too late. As the Shinsengumi mourns for Ayumu's death, a regretful Hijikata orders that the funeral will be done quickly and discreetly. When Tetsu sits with Susumu atop a roof at night, he shares that he could not even finish the last meal Ayumu had made for him. Susumu then unveils that Ayumu had taken his place as a watcher to protect him from facing death. The next morning, Tetsu promises to be friends with Susumu hereafter.
| 20 | "Blade"; Transliteration: "Yaiba" (Japanese: 刃) | February 24, 2004 |
Okita warrants Masuya for interrogation, who is responsible for harboring outlaw ronin to aid him in rebelling against the Shogunate. Susumu, impersonating Ayumu, stabs Masuya to unconsciousness, in repayment for her death. Hijikata later interrogates Masuya through torture, finding out that he wanted to act on his own will instead of taking orders from Yoshida. While Tetsu and Suzu walk to an abandoned cabin in a forest, the latter tries kill him. Yoshida, subduing a hesitant Suzu, scares Tetsu into the cabin, and sets it on fire, preparing to kill him. Tatsu is overwhelmed after knowing that Tetsu has been trapped inside the burning cabin.
| 21 | "Battle Array"; Transliteration: "Jin" (Japanese: 陣) | March 2, 2004 |
Tatsu tells Okita that Tetsu has been carrying emotional scars for two years, traumatized that he relived that moment when his parents were murdered by an unknown assailant in an inflamed building. After Hijikata learns from Masuya that the outlaw ronin were ordered to set the Imperial Palace on fire, he spares Masuya's life but leaves him tied up with rope. Suzu feels guilty for not killing Tetsu, but Yoshida suspends his duties as a page in response. The Shinsengumi makes plans to attack the Chōshū clan during a meeting in an inn at a nearby bridge. Tatsu serves dinner to Yamanami, who is unable to join the battle due to sickness. Susumu tries to talk some sense into Tetsu, who has locked himself in the cabinet due to trauma. When Tatsu tries to stop Susumu, the latter tells him that he should be relieved for what Tetsu has been through.
| 22 | "Fight"; Transliteration: "Ikusa" (Japanese: 戦) | March 9, 2004 |
Yamanami shares with Tetsu that he used to watch a school of ricefishes flow downstream along a canal all day during springtime as a child. The Shinsengumi continue to raid the inn. Yoshida witnesses as his subordinates Teizo Miyabe and Jyusuke Matsuda are slaughtered by Kondō's hands. Yoshida allows Suzu to call in reinforcements and report back to him. Yoshida gets his spear sliced in half by Heisuke, but he impales the spear onto Heisuke's head before Shinpachi has the chance to stop him. Meanwhile, Susumu clashes against Yugao on the rooftops. Okita goes head on against Yoshida in an intense sword fight. When Tetsu finally shows up, Okita tells him to run away and hide. Okita is soon pinned on the ground, left defenseless. Just as Yoshida prepares to kill Okita, Tetsu intervenes takes on Yoshida by himself.
| 23 | "Truth"; Transliteration: "Makoto" (Japanese: 誠) | March 16, 2004 |
As Susumu and Yugao end their battle, they reconcile and go their separate ways. Suzu begs for reinforcements from the clan to be called in, but he receives no answer at the front gate. Tetsu, due to having an advantage over Yoshida, who has sustained a wounded in his leg, cuts off his arm from his body. Tetsu is surprised to find out that Yoshida is not the one who murdered his parents two years back. As Yoshida grabs a sword fragment in his mouth to be aimed at Tetsu's throat, Okita severs his head from behind. Hijikata later realizes that Okita has been coughing up blood for many days, and Tetsu serves Okita some tea, much to Hijikata's appreciation. Suzu, upon returning to see that Tetsu has killed Yoshida, cradles the head that remains on the ground.
| 24 | "Iron"; Transliteration: "Kurogane" (Japanese: 鐵) | March 23, 2004 |
Tetsu has a dream, finding himself on Ryōma's warship, where his father appears to tell him to follow the path of a peacemaker. Sanosuke, Shinpachi and Keisuke, despite their focus on the upcoming festival, is told by Hijikata to be on their guard for another attack by the Chōshū clan. Okita denies that his health is slowly depleting. Yamanami takes Tetsu to a shrine to pay requests to someone who lost his life during the battle. During the festival, Tetsu runs off, while Tatsu and Susumu wait for him to come back. Susumu forgives Tatsu for his retaliation of when he had snapped Tetsu out of the trauma. Akesato falls ill at the okiya, in which Saya and Hana are asked to stay for her care. When Tetsu finally talks with Saya, he promises never to kill anyone when he draws his sword. At night, Tetsu watches the fireworks with Tatsu and Susumu on the ground, and he later joins Hijikata, Okita and Kondō on a rooftop.

== DVD releases ==
=== Region 1 (North America) ===
| Box Set | Date | Discs | Episodes | Reference |
|---|---|---|---|---|
| Complete Series | September 6, 2011 | 4 | 1-24 | |
