= List of Gurren Lagann characters =

List of primary characters from Tengen Toppa Gurren Lagann

This is a list of primary characters from the anime series Tengen Toppa Gurren Lagann. Most of them are people who became the first members of Team Gurren. The plot of Tengen Toppa Gurren Lagann is divided into two main story arcs, separated by a seven-year timeskip. After the timeskip, most characters undergo important changes in their appearances and/or personalities, and some of them have their own unique roles in the overall story.

== Protagonists ==
=== Simon ===
Voiced by: Tetsuya Kakihara, Takayuki Sugō (Old) (Japanese); Jessie James Grelle (A.D. Vision dub), Yuri Lowenthal (Bang Zoom! dub), Tony Oliver (Old, Bang Zoom! dub) (English)

Personal Gunmen

- Lagann
- Gurren Lagann
- Arc-Gurren Lagann
- Super Galaxy Gurren Lagann
- Tengen Toppa Gurren Lagann
- Tengen Toppa Lagann (movie only)
- Super Tengen Toppa Gurren Lagann (movie only)

The series' protagonist, Simon (シモン, Shimon) (pronounced SEE-mohn) is a boy who initially suffered from low self-esteem due to being an orphan, with his parents having died in a cave-in, and a fear of earthquakes. Despite being physically underdeveloped for his age and adults and girls ignoring him, Simon is a valued digger in Giha Village. Kamina eventually befriends him and inspires him, giving him the confidence to muster his courage and take action. After finding Lagann during a dig, Simon accompanies Kamina to the surface, where he develops a crush on Yoko before learning she has feelings for Kamina. When Kamina dies during the formation of Team Dai-Gurren, Simon falls into a depression that causes him to be overly aggressive in battle while isolating himself from the team. However, his meeting with Nia helps him come to a revelation about his own nature, leading to him overcoming his fears and doubts as he succeeds Kamina as Team Dai-Gurren's leader.

In the second half of the series, Simon grows into a young man who is able to exercise caution when necessary. He planned to marry Nia until Antispiral uses her to begin their attack on Earth. This results in the government sending him to jail to ease the people, later breaking free with help from Yoko and Viral to take back Cathedral Terra as he leads Team Dai-Gurren to save Nia and destroy Antispiral. Managing to marry Nia before she fades away, Simon gives Lagann's key to Gimmy as he leaves his friends to wander the planet as a nameless vagrant, stating that "there are others more fit to travel down the tunnels I dug". In the epilogue, Simon is now an old man and watches his former comrades set out to contact other races throughout the galaxy to help prevent the Spiral Nemesis and ensure the universe's safety. It is revealed that the narrator at the beginning of most episodes is an older Simon, as the narrator's Japanese and Bang Zoom! English dub voice actors also voice old Simon.

=== Kamina ===
Voiced by: Katsuyuki Konishi (Japanese); Brett Weaver (A.D. Vision dub), Kyle Hebert (Bang Zoom! dub) (English)

Personal Gunmen:

- Gurren
- Gurren Lagann

Kamina (カミナ) is a young man from the subterranean village of Giha, who dreams of leaving the underground and going to the surface, which he believes he saw as a child with his father. His father went on, but Kamina was hesitant to join him; as a result, Kamina swore that he would eventually return to the surface and reunite with his father. He is arrogant and passionate about his goals, willing to pursue them without fear or hesitation. This attitude often manifests in dramatic speeches which serve to rally others to his cause. Kamina forms "Team Gurren" and convinces Simon, who he considers his "blood-brother", to help him with his plan to drill through the village's roof and reach the world above. However, the plan fails, with him willingly taking the blame for disrupting the peace and the village chief jailing him. At night, Simon breaks him out to show him an extraordinary artifact he unearthed, only to be interrupted when a large Gunmen crashes through the village's ceiling. Yoko descends from the surface and ends up joining Kamina (now carrying a nodachi that he stole from the village chief) and Simon as they pilot the newly unearthed Gunmen, which Kamina names "Lagann". Together, they defeat the invading Gunmen and reach the surface in the process.

Kamina eventually gets his own Gunmen, which he names "Gurren". During a fight, Kamina discovers a skeleton that turns out to be his father. After burying him, Kamina takes his tattered cloak and a small piece breaks off at the end. Simon grabs this piece and ties it around his arm, signifying their bond. Over time, "Team Gurren" expands to the size of a resistance force aiming to overthrow the Beastmen Empire, which Kamina leads and names "Team Dai-Gurren". Kamina's largest battle involves the capture of one of the enemy's moving fortresses belonging to one of the Four Supreme Generals, Thymilph. The mission is successful, as Kamina combines with Simon to form Gurren Lagann and defeats the General with his signature move, "Giga Drill Break." However, he dies in the process, with his dying words being "Listen up, Simon, and don't forget. Believe in yourself. Not in the me who believes in you. Not in the you who believes in me. You should believe in yourself!" These words are long remembered after his death, giving Simon the confidence to uphold his destiny as the "one whose drill will pierce the heavens." As well, Kamina's signature pose, in which he sticks his index finger up into the air, along with his catchphrase, "Who the hell do you think I am?" (俺を誰だと思ってやがる, Ore o dare da to omotte yagaru?) is mirrored by several characters as a tribute to him and as a symbol of confidence in Team Dai-Gurren. Kamina is buried in the battlefield where he died, his nodachi stabbed into the ground and his cloak tied to its sheath.

After the fall of the Beastmen Empire, a new city is built from the ruins of the former capital, Teppelin, and named "Kamina City.", with a huge statue of Kamina at the center of the city in his honor. However, the monument is destroyed after the citizens discover the truth about the Human Annihilation System and revolt against the government.

He reappears when Simon, under the influence of the Anti-Spirals, witnesses visions of a false childhood where Kamina urges him to drill into banks and jewelry shops to steal valuables for him. He is shown groveling at the feet of beastmen atop of a hill, begging for his life and urging Simon to do the same. As Simon reaches for his Core Drill, he finds it missing. Then, the true Kamina appears, wearing his cloak and holding his nodachi, asking Simon if he lost his Drill. Kamina then reminds Simon that his drill is his soul, that he and his fallen comrades will live on in him, and that he is the one whose drill will pierce the heavens. Simon is reminded of what he is fighting for: for the sake of Nia and the fate of the Spiral Universe. This breaks the Alternate Multiverse Labyrinth, allowing Simon to reassemble Team Dai-Gurren and face the Anti-Spirals. In the epilogue, Kamina's grave is seen surrounded by other swords representing the members of Team Dai-Gurren who sacrificed themselves in the final battle.

=== Yoko Littner ===
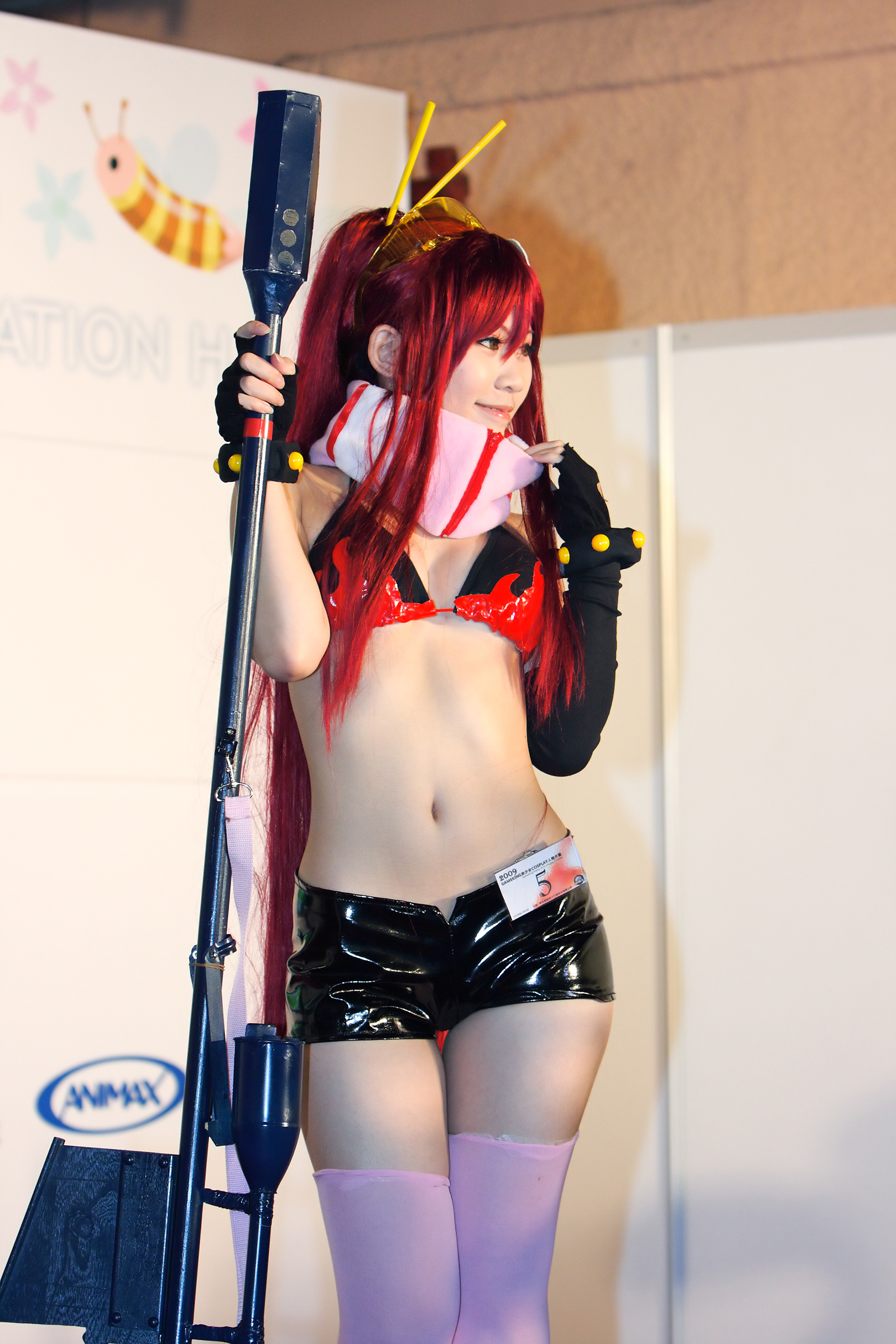
A Yoko Littner cosplayer at TIBE 2009

Voiced by: Marina Inoue (Japanese); Tiffany Grant (A.D. Vision dub), Michelle Ruff (Bang Zoom! dub) (English)

Personal Gunmen:

- Yoko M Tank (movie only)
- Space Dayakkaiser (anime only)
- Space Yoko W Tank (movie only)
- Tengen Toppa Yoko W Tank (movie only)
- Super Tengen Toppa Gurren Lagann (movie only)

Yoko Littner (ヨーコ・リットナー, Yōko Rittonā), is a young woman from the village of Littner. She has considerable combat experience even before her chance meeting with Kamina and Simon. When a Gunman crashes through the roof of Giha village and prepares to attack the populace, Yoko, who had been tracking it, intervenes and attacks it with an electromagnetic rifle, disabling it and allowing Kamina and the villagers to flee. However, Kamina, chooses to make advances at Yoko and initially diminishes her combat qualifications because of her gender, yet acknowledges "that lady's spunk".

She decides to accompany Simon and Kamina on their quest. Despite their constant banter, Yoko soon becomes infatuated with Kamina, with Simon also having feelings for her until he discovers the two kissing. She is stated to be the same age as Simon, but it is implied that Littner measures time differently, as all humans live underground and may have a differing number of days in a year. She is mature for her age and the most rational member of the group, traits which helped her to cope with Kamina's death.

After the war of liberation, in which she plays a major role, Yoko eschews taking part in politics at Kamina City. Desiring to distance herself from her warrior past, she takes the name Yomako and moves to remote Koreha Island, where she becomes a teacher at its elementary school. However, after learning of the events occurring at Kamina City and two gunmen attacking her, she temporarily leaves the island and breaks into Rinkane Jail to release Simon. After leaving the prison with Boota, Simon and Viral, she joins the other members of Team Dai-Gurren and pilots the Dayakkaiser to pursue the war against the Anti-Spirals.

In the epilogue, an older Yoko is seen at the school, now in the role of principal.

=== Nia Teppelin ===
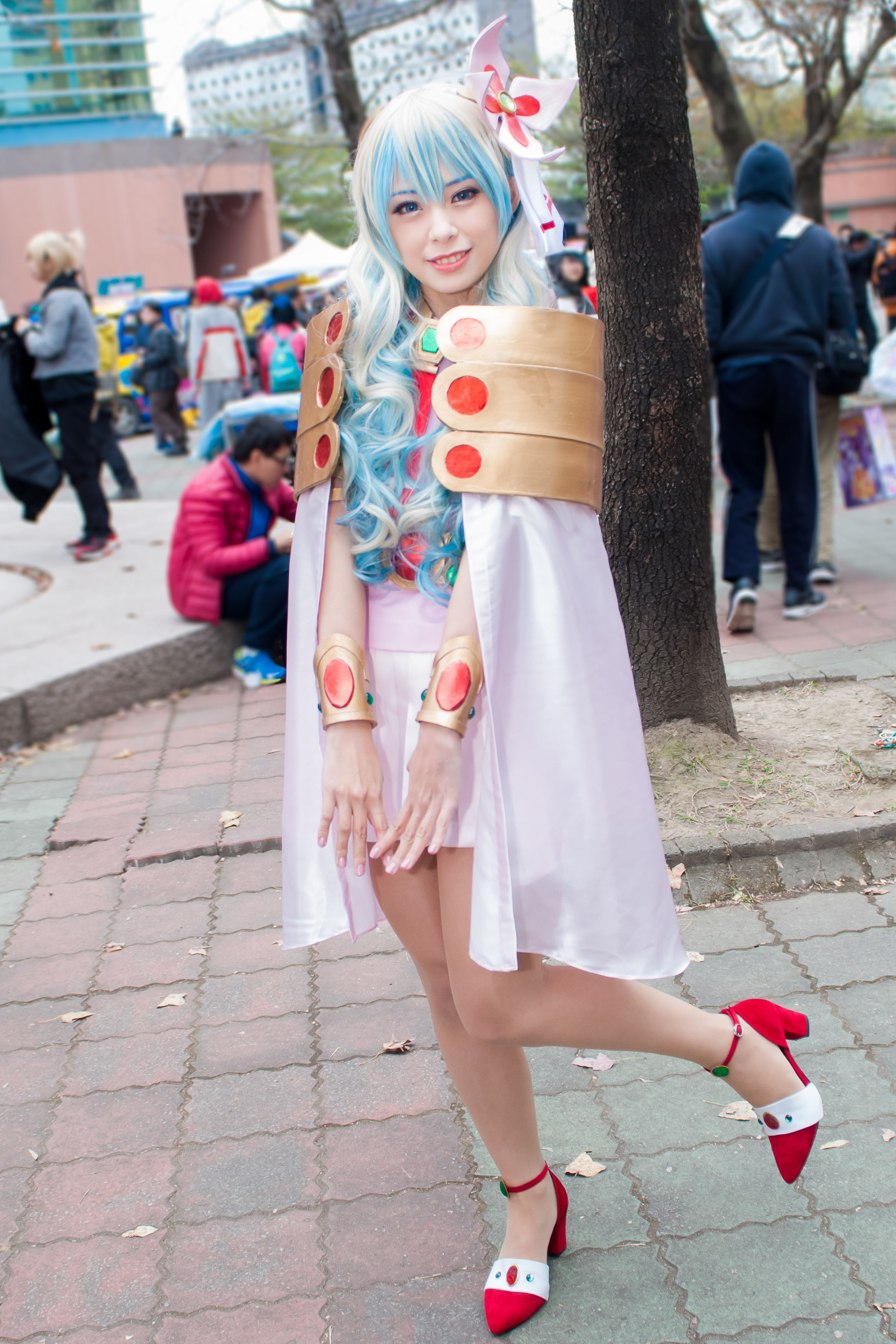
A Nia Teppelin cosplayer at Fancy Frontier 29 2017

Voiced by: Yukari Fukui (Japanese); Luci Christian (A.D. Vision dub), Hynden Walch (young, series, Bang Zoom! dub), Bridget Hoffman (Bang Zoom! dub) (English)

Personal Gunmen:

- Tengen Toppa Solvernia (movie only)
- Super Tengen Toppa Gurren Lagann (movie only)

Nia Teppelin (ニア・テッペリン, Nia Tepperin) is a mysterious young girl Simon finds sleeping in a capsule amidst a dump site when he was still distraught over Kamina's death. She is later revealed to be Lordgenome's daughter, who abandoned her. She had no prior contact with humans except her father, though she is very curious, pure and innocent. Although her lineage initially caused concern, Team Dai-Gurren quickly accepts her, much to the initial irking of Yoko, who later becomes her close friend. During her journey, she develops a strong empathy for Simon and joins him in the final confrontation against her father.

Seven years after the war with the Beastmen, Simon proposes to Nia. She initially refuses, having misunderstood his words, but accepts after receiving counseling from Kiyoh and Kiyal. However, when the population limit is reached, the Anti-Spiral data awakens within her and converts her into an Anti-Spiral virtual lifeform, serving as their emissary in charge of Earth's Human Extermination System. Despite her emotionless persona, Simon tells her that her actions and appearances before him were the true feelings of her former self, who urges Simon to keep fighting, allowing Nia to have the strength to return to her former self while ending the Human Extermination. However, she is transported back to the Anti-Spiral homeworld so the data on Team Dai Gurren can be extracted from her for analysis, with Simon vowing to rescue her. Although she is saved, the Anti-Spiral's death causes her to fade away, as her existence as a program is dependent on the Anti-Spiral Race. She lasts long enough to marry Simon before vanishing, leaving behind her ring. In the epilogue, a memorial site is seen in her honor, located adjacent to Kamina's burial ground.

She has a habit of rambling due to lacking knowledge of regular customs, such as her cell phone away message stating, "I am not here right now, well it is not that I am not here it is just I cannot reach my cellphone right now. Also, please try calling my house than my cell...". Despite Simon describing this as making her nearly impossible to understand, he also notes she speaks warmly and kindly.

=== Viral ===
Voiced by: Nobuyuki Hiyama (Japanese); Vic Mignogna (A.D. Vision dub), Sam Riegel (Bang Zoom! dub) (English)

Personal Gunmen:

- Enki
- Enkidu
- Enkidudu
- Tengen Toppa Enkidurga (movie only)
- Super Tengen Toppa Gurren Lagann (movie only)

Viral (ヴィラル, Viraru) (pronounced "Veer-ral") is a member of the Human Eradication Army, who regards Kamina as a strong rival after losing his Enki's helmet to the newly created Gurren Lagann. Despite being among the more humanoid of the Beastmen, his DNA contains aspects of tiger genetics. He is loyal to Lordgenome and the four Supreme Generals, and does his best to serve them. While under General Thymilph, he has a personal Gunmen called Enki, which mainly utilizes swords and a powerful head-mounted laser which the manga calls the Enki Sun Attack. After Kamina's death, he continues to fight Gurren Lagann to regain his honor, believing that he is still alive. However, upon learning the truth, he focuses his frustrations on Simon before refusing to kill him on Cytomander's orders when he holds Yoko hostage. After being brought before Lordgenome, he learns the truth of the Beastmens' lifespans before receiving the gift of immortality. Though he believes this was so he can kill Simon without fearing death, Lordgenome reveals this was to ensure he had an eternal witness of the Spiral King's power. However, Lordgenome dies in the battle and Viral disappears as Dekabutsu collapses around him.

Years later, having protected some humans who wished to remain underground, Viral resurfaces and causes an uproar with Enkidudu, calling Simon out to fight him. The Grapeals later take him into custody, with him being placed in the same prison Simon later ends up in as a scapegoat for the Anti-Spirals' appearance. Becoming a reformed villain of sorts, Viral pilots Gurren during the battle against the Anti-Spirals and seemingly gains his own Spiral Energy from being exposed to Simon's, seen in his Core Drill in the series and Tengen Toppa Enkidurga in the movie. It is also shown that his deepest desire is to get married and have children, but he cannot do so as Beastmen lack the spiral energy necessary for reproduction. In the epilogue, he becomes the captain of the Super Galaxy Dai-Gurren and an emissary for Earth.

=== Rossiu Adai ===
Voiced by: Mitsuki Saiga, Jouji Nakata (Old) (Japanese); Chris Patton (A.D. Vision dub), Johnny Yong Bosch (Bang Zoom! dub), Michael McConnohie (Old, Bang Zoom! dub) (English)

Rossiu Adai (ロシウ・アダイ, Roshiu Adai) is a modest but intelligent boy from the underground village of Adai, whose people worship the Gunmen as gods. He is the apprentice of Father Magin, the High Priest who governs Adai and performs its ritualistic method of dealing with overpopulation by having people draw sticks, with the winners sent up to the surface to die, with Rossiu's mother being among those chosen. However, when Gimmy and Darry are selected to leave the village, Rossiu learned Magin rigged it as they are orphans and decides to go with them, thus joining Team Gurren. Before he leaves, the village elder gives him a book that seems to withhold some secrets from humanity's past, tasking him with finding someone who can read it, as no one in his village can decipher its contents. After joining Team Gurren, Kamina often teases him, calling him "Forehead Boy". After Kamina's death, Rossiu temporarily begins piloting Gurren in his place.

After the end of the war, Rossiu becomes Simon's second-in-command, trying to make him act more serious about his duties as the ruler of Kamina City. However, despite his time with Team Dai-Gurren, Rossiu becomes more like Magin and takes Lordgenome's last words seriously, leading a secret project to access Lordgenome's memories and learn the history behind him and the Anti-Spirals. However, when the Anti-Spiralized Nia causes a riot across the city and an angry mob forms against Team Dai-Gurren, Rossiu decides to use Simon as a scapegoat and overthrows him. Despite placing him in prison with the death penalty and maintaining a cold heartless facade in public, Rossiu secretly laments his actions, keeping this secret from everyone except Kinon. Rossiu and his subordinates prepared a contingency plan by having people take shelter in the underground villages, which the government assumed to be safe, with a select few to board the excavated Arc-Gurren. After Leeron shows him that no life form would survive the impact, which would render the planet uninhabitable for one year, Rossiu decides to change his plans by filling the rest with animals and livestock, ensuring their survival while abandoning the rest of mankind. However, when Earth is attacked earlier than expected, he escapes with only half the expected refugees on board the Arc-Gurren.

However, the Anti-Spirals foil his plans again, as they had set a large force to ambush the Arc-Gurren in space. Just as he is about to lose hope, Simon and the rest of Team Dai-Gurren come to his aid. One week after the Human Extermination System is stopped, Rossiu leaves a farewell message before setting off for Adai where he intends to commit suicide after settling things with Magin, revealing that he was never able to decipher the book, with his best theory being that someone filled the book with gibberish as a prank. However, Kinon finds the message and Simon accompanies her to stop him, with Simon beating sense into him and giving him the strength to keep living. Rossiu takes the duty of watching out for Kamina City, while Simon and the rest of Team Dai-Gurren depart from Earth to the Anti-Spirals' homeworld with help from Kinon and Guinble. After the final battle against the Anti-Spirals, Rossiu is the priest for Simon and Nia's wedding, In the epilogue, he is seen still holding the position of commander-in-chief, as Simon did not reclaim it, and wonders if he did a good enough job as a leader or if Simon would have done better.

=== Kittan Bachika ===
Voiced by: Kishō Taniyama (Japanese); Jason Douglas (A.D. Vision dub), Christopher Corey Smith (Bang Zoom! dub) (English)

Personal Gunmen:

- King Kittan
- King Kittan Deluxe
- Space King Kittan

Kittan Bachika (キタン・バチカ, Kitan Bachika) is the oldest of the Black Siblings. In his first encounter with Team Gurren, he confuses Kamina for a Beastman, which is reconciled after it is discovered Kamina is piloting the Gunmen Gurren. In the manga, they meet up with Kamina and co. at the same time Viral appears. Soon after, the Black Siblings and Team Gurren meet the sixteen-headed enemy Gunmen, whom the former had encountered earlier. After the enemy Gunmen is defeated, the two teams part ways;. Kittan eventually parts ways with his sisters, who join Team Gurren soon after, before returning to aid Team Gurren against Thymilph in his own Gunman, King Kittan, along with others who were inspired by Kamina and obtained their own Gunmen. This event leads to the formation of Team Dai-Gurren. After Kamina's death, Kittan temporarily takes over as the self-proclaimed leader of the team, but transfers leadership to Simon after he recovers from his depression over Kamina's death.

After the war, Kittan becomes the Chief of the Legal Affairs Bureau in Kamina City, but begins to resent Rossiu when he sentences Simon to death and allows his sister Kinon to wear an explosive-equipped vest to accompany Simon if he attempts to escape. Though he eventually understands the position Rossiu was in, Kittan resigns after discovering Rossiu's plan to evacuate Earth using the Arc-Gurren. Before leaving, he demands Rossiu to return the Core Drill he took from Simon and heads out on his Gunman to deliver it to him.

He ultimately sacrifices himself to protect the other members of Team Dai-Gurren and break the Death Spiral Machine's shield. Simon orders Super Galaxy Dai-Gurren, which is unable to escape the dense space sea the Death Spiral Machine produces, to move towards the center of the sea, where a powerful shield surrounds the Machine. After the ship's weapons fail to break the shield, Kittan offers to take the Space King Kittan to destroy the shield and attack the Machine's core, but not before stealing a kiss from Yoko, and apologizing for "[his] selfishness". Though he successfully breaks through the shield, the immense gravity of the space sea crushes Space King Kittan, seemingly killing Kittan. However, the original King Kittan, wielding one of the drills that broke off from the Gurren-Lagann when it attempted to transform Super Galaxy Dai-Gurren into humanoid form, flies towards the Machine's core. Kittan awakens his own Spiral Energy, melding the drill to his King Kittan and performing a variation of the Giga Drill Break, King Kittan Giga Drill Break, to destroy the Death Spiral Machine. He dies in the resulting explosion, after acknowledging his interest in Spiral energy. The Super Galaxy Dai-Gurren is freed from the space sea, enabling Simon to transform it into Super Galaxy Gurren-Lagann and fulfill Kittan's dying wish.

In the epilogue, a memorial site for him, in the form of a sword, is seen alongside Kamina, Nia, and the other members of Team Dai-Gurren who sacrificed themselves in the war with the Anti-Spirals. In the movie, there is a brief scene after the final battle where Kittan's siblings mourn his death.

=== Boota ===
Voiced by: Shizuka Itō (Japanese); Monica Rial (A.D. Vision dub), Julie Ann Taylor (Bang Zoom! dub) (English)

The unofficial mascot of Team Dai-Gurren, Boota (ブータ, Būta) is a small pig-mole from Giha village, whom Simon keeps as a pet. Boota is characterized by his sunglasses and the star pattern around his tail. Although he can only say his name, he has near-human intelligence and can understand humans. He likes to stay between Yoko's breasts or on Simon's shoulder. He can rip off his tail and the tip of his rear end as an emergency food supply for Kamina and Simon and has served as a morale figure to Yoko when she initially hesitated to pilot Gurren in place of Kamina. He is later thrown in prison alongside Simon, but ultimately escapes.

After Viral allows him to enter Gurren's cockpit, he releases a massive surge of Spiral Energy to aid Simon in opwering up Super Galaxy Dai-Gurren. Lordgenome states that this occurred not only because humans are not the only beings capable of generating Spiral Energy. He also suggests that Boota's frequent exposure to Simon's Spiral Energy may have triggered the reaction. Boota later protects Lordgenome from the Anti-Spiral when it attacks him, and is transformed into an anthropomorphic humanoid when their Spiral Energy resonates. In this form, his attacks are laced with Spiral Energy. Curiously, his "human form" appears in the prologue of the first episode. However, he is defeated and the Anti-Spiral traps him in the Multiverse Labyrinth; when Simon frees him, the transformation was undone.

In the epilogue, he is seen wandering the world alongside Simon.

=== Leeron Littner ===
Voiced by: Masaya Onosaka (Japanese); Mark Laskowski (A.D. Vision dub), Steve Blum (Bang Zoom! dub) (English)

Leeron Littner (リーロン・リットナー, Rīron Rittonā), nicknamed "Ron", is the intelligent and flamboyant mechanic of Littner, who repairs and scavenges the various Gunmen he and his group encounter. He was the first one to join Kamina, Simon, and Yoko on their quest to defeat the Beastmen, becoming the main technician for Team Dai-Gurren and in charge of coordination and communication between the Gunmen during battle.

Upon first meeting Kamina and Simon, Leeron acts flirtatious around them, as well as with Gimmy and Viral. Kamina threatens him, while Simon mostly does not mind him but still regards him with concern. Over time, Leeron stops his attempts to proposition the boys, resulting in a more cordial relationship, with Simon praising Leeron for his work.

After the war, Leeron becomes the Chief of the Science Bureau of Kamina City, with his team succeeding in launching a rocket to the Moon to investigate it and confirm the veracity of Lordgenome's prophecy.

Throughout the series, Leeron seemingly does not age; however, in the epilogue, his normally green hair appears to be greyer.

== Antagonists ==
=== Beastmen Kingdom ===
Beastmen are a "species" of humanoids that are the primary antagonists of Parts I and II of the series. The product of an ideal blending of human and animal genes, they are intentionally flawed hybrids with human intelligence and form and features of various animals. Lordgenome originally engineered the Beastmen as soldiers against the Anti-Spirals, as the substitution of animal genes distorted the shape of human spiral DNA and rendered them invisible to detection. However, doing so came at the cost of evolutionary potential, as Beastmen lack Spiral Energy and cannot pilot Gunmen without using solar-powered batteries. Furthermore, their bodies deteriorate at an accelerated rate and their cell lines weaken over time, forcing Lordgenome to deep freeze unborn specimens in a constant state of regeneration.

After the Anti-Spirals caused the extinction of the Spiral Warriors, Lordgenome retreated to Earth and reassigned the Beastmen to act as population control, killing humans who trespassed above ground to prevent the population from growing large enough for the Anti-Spirals to detect. Lordgenome divided his forces into the four branches of the "Human Eradication Army", each led by one of his four Supreme Generals, responsible for monitoring a distinct cardinal direction of the planet's surface. Each of the four Supreme Generals represents one of the four classical elements: earth, air, fire and water.

After Lordgenome's death, the Beastmen armies are disbanded and all Gunmen are scrapped. Many Beastmen living within Teppelin survive its collapse, and Nia convinces them to accept peace with the human victors and integrate into Kamina City's society without prejudice. On the outskirts of civilization, liberated Beastmen warlords continue to wage campaigns against human settlements, including battles between the New Government and Beastmen. Seven years following the Battle of Teppelin, the Grapearl Squadrons have eliminated most of these resistance forces.

==== Thymilph ====
Voiced by: Kiyoyuki Yanada (Japanese); Paul St. Peter (Bang Zoom! dub) (English)

Thymilph the Crasher (チミルフ, Chimirufu) is the first of the Spiral King's Four Supreme Generals to be introduced, who represents the classical element of fire. He is a skilled tactician and warrior, and is Viral's initial superior officer and commander of the Human Eradication Army Eastern Branch, which he monitors from the deck of the land battleship, the Dai-Gunzan. He is good friends with Adiane, though Guame implies they have a closer relationship.

He is an armored warrior with gorilla features who often wields a large iron hammer for close combat. He has a high respect for caution and shrewdness, but like Viral, possesses a warrior's code of honor. He is ultimately killed when Kamina and Simon destroy his personal Gunmen, the Byakou, using the Giga Drill Break. Guame implies that many Beastmen throughout the Beastmen Empire idolized him. Thymilph's name is derived from the DNA chemical thymine and the elemental Sylph. His Gunmen, Byakou, is based on the mythical White Tiger, Byakko.

==== Adiane ====
Voiced by: Michiko Neya (Japanese); Megan Hollingshead (Bang Zoom! dub) (English)

Adiane the Elegant (アディーネ, Adīne) is the second of the Spiral King's Four Supreme Generals to be introduced and the only female general among them. She represents the classical element of water. She is good friends with Thymilph, though Guame though Guame implies they have a closer relationship. She implies this friendship is strong because Guame and Cytomander treated her as inferior because of her gender, while Thymilph respected her as a warrior. After Thymilph's death, Adiane vows revenge and volunteers to attack the Team Dai-Gurren when Lordgenome gives her the opportunity. Though she initially refuses his aid due to blaming him for Thymilph's death, she recruits Viral after he saves her from the Dai-Gurren crushing her following her attempt to execute Nia after learning Lordgenome abandoned her. However, because of her boasting and staking her pride on the task, Adiane refuses to return to Teppelin until she destroys Team Dai-Gurren, using the sea to her advantage when the Dai-Gurren crosses it on route to Teppelin. She fights the Gurren-Lagann in her Sayrune, but the plan fails and she attempts to take Nia hostage until Yoko disables the Sayrune's shoulder, leaving it open to fire from the Dai-Gurren's cannons and killing Adiane in the ensuing explosion.

Adiane looks mostly human, but has a scorpion tail and a snake eye. She wears an eyepatch over her left eye and wears a loose-fitting dress and heels. She is impulsive and often lets her anger get the better of her. However, she is skilled in combat and can fight several Gunmen at once without using her powers.

Adiane's name is derived from the DNA chemical adenine and the elemental Undine. Her Gunmen, Sayrune, is based on the mythical Azure Dragon, Seiryū

==== Cytomander ====
Voiced by: Akio Suyama (Japanese); Steve Staley (Bang Zoom! dub) (English)

Cytomander the Swift (シトマンドラ, Shitomandora) is one of the Spiral King's Four Supreme Generals. He is the commander of Teppelin's aerial forces and owner of the flying battleship, Dai-Gunten. He represents the classical element of air or wind. Following Adiane's death, Cytomander personally goes after Team Dai-Gurren in Dai-Gunten, but is forced to retreat after Gurren Lagann hijacks one of his fighters to give itself wings and greatly damages his battleship. A month later, on the sixth day of Team Dai-Gurren's assault on Teppelin, he leads a two-pronged attack with Guame in the Dai-Gundo, only to die when the Dai-Gurren rams his Gunman, Shuzack, as it sinks the Dai-Gunten.

Cytomander's name is derived from the DNA chemical cytosine and the elemental Salamander. His Gunmen, Shuzack, is based on the mythical Vermilion Bird, Suzaku.

==== Guame ====
Voiced by: Kiyoshi Kawakubo (Japanese); Doug Stone (Bang Zoom! dub) (English)

Guame the Immoveable (グァーム, Gwāmu) is the oldest of the Spiral King's Four Supreme Generals, who specializes in ground combat. He represents the classical element of earth. Unlike the other Beastmen, who worship him as a god, Guame appears to merely respect the Spiral King. His appearance resembles that of a crocodile and armadillo; the parallel works reveal he was originally an animal-like figure who, like Boota, was Lordgenome's companion, and that he has lived as long as the Spiral King. When he and the two other generals report Thymilph's death to the Spiral King, Cytomander questions him after he asks the king to let him go after Team Dai-Gurren. Guame explains his relationship to the King as being ancient; he later refers to Cytomander as a "pup of two-hundred-years age", implying he is significantly older than him and that, to him, two hundred years is not a long time. After successfully capturing the Dai-Gurren's crew, Guame has Nia brought to him and reveals to her the truth if why she was abandoned while offering to spare her if she becomes leader of the "Beauty Village" where the Spiral King gets his consorts from. However, Nia refuses and Guame is forced to retreat when Team Dai-Gurren escapes and fights back.

A month later, on the sixth day of Team Dai-Gurren's assault on Tepplin, Guame joins Cytomander in an attack using both their battleships. After the Dai-Gunten is sunk, Guame uses Teppelin's power supply to have the Dai-Gundo create a massive tornado to destroy Team Dai-Gurren and their reinforcements. However, his plans are ruined when the Gurren-Lagann tunnels underneath the fortress to impale it with its drill, killing Guame as the Dai-Gundo explodes.

Guame's name is derived from the DNA chemical guanine and the elemental Gnome. His Gunmen, Gember, is based on the mythical Black Tortoise, Genbu.

==== Lordgenome ====
Voiced by: Narushi Ikeda (Japanese); Jamieson Price (Bang Zoom! dub) (English)

Personal Gunmen:

- Lazengann
- Dekabutsu
- Unnamed Daigun, later named Arc-Gurren by Rossiu (flashbacks; Parallel Works 8)
- Cathedral Terra (flashbacks; Parallel Works 8)

Lordgenome (ロージェノム, Rōjenomu) is the main antagonist of the first story arc, who is known as the "Spiral King" and commands his armies from Teppelin, a gigantic funnel-shaped fortress which is actually a massive hibernating Gunman. He is a cruel and ruthless tyrant who employed the Beastmen to kill humans for over a thousand years. He displays superhuman feats of strength, agility, and endurance, to the point where he can easily hold his own against Lagann. In the past, Lordgenome was a child with an affinity for animals who found a gunman similar to Lagann and fought the Anti-Spirals when they invaded his world. He became one of the four Spiral Generals, who commanded legions of Spiral Warriors charged with ensuring peace and order throughout the Milky Way Galaxy. However, their numbers dwindled over time and the Anti-Spirals eventually appeared before him, killing everyone aboard the Cathedral Terra before using Lazengann to transform Cathedral Terra into Cathedral Lazengann and wipe out his entire fleet. Soon after, they converted Cathedral Terra into a defense mechanism, and Lordgenome used his Beastmen in an effort to drive the population underground and keep them under control. He also created "Beauty Village", a village made up of girls abducted from other villages, to stop the birth of an Anti-Spiral scout. He had several children with the women of the village over the centuries, killing them after they became self-aware.

However, Lordgenome's plans go awry after Team Dai-Gurren is formed, and he is eventually forced to fight Gurren Lagann in Lazengann to end the human resistance. During the battle, Simon fatally injures him and he cryptically prophesying the Anti-Spirals' return before he falls off of Teppelin. Seven years later, Rossiu recovers his brain, which regenerates into a head that serves as a "bio-computer" to provide the group access to his knowledge. He eventually regains his prior self-awareness and personality and helps in the fight against the Anti-Spirals, regenerating and sacrificing himself during the final battle to ensure Team Dai-Gurren's victory.

Lordgenome's name is derived from Lord, a feudal superior, and Genome, an organism's hereditary DNA.

=== Antispiral ===
Voiced by: Takaya Kamikawa (Japanese); Dave Mallow (series), Crispin Freeman (compilation films) (Bang Zoom! dub) (English)

Antispiral (アンチスパイラル, Anchisupairaru) is the true main antagonist of the series and the main antagonist of the second story arc. He is the leader and collective mental manifestation of the Anti-Spiral Race (反螺旋族, Hanrasen Zoku, literally "Anti Spiral Tribe"), a mysterious group of Alien beings that long ago realized the danger of Spiral Nemesis. To combat it, they halted their evolution by purging themselves of Spiral Power, trapping themselves in a state of suspended animation as their collective consciousness took form to purge the universe of Spiral Life.

He first appears as a disembodied voice, with his physical form being a chaos of arbitrary human concepts fluctuating on a black silhouette. His near-infinite spiral energy gives the Anti-Spiral extensive, almost supernatural powers, which manifest in the form of purple energy. Using these abilities, he is able to manipulate or break physical and chemical laws, including altering probability, which he does offensively and as a form of intimidation. Antispiral has the mannerisms of a scientist, suggesting he was involved in both the creation of Anti-Spiral technology and the decision to undergo the millennia-long battle against the universe's spiral beings. Antispiral is very proud and holds deep contempt for Spiral beings, being frustrated that despite his efforts, there are Spiral beings who still resist the limiting of their populations and defy the resolution of his race and their ideology. Antispiral is depicted as being omniscient and omnipresent on a multiversal level, having complete control over every dimension Team Dai-Gurren encounters, having knowledge of everything they are doing, and at one point trapping their consciousness in a Multiverse Labyrinth of "infinite possibilities".

Thousands of years prior to the events of the series, Antispiral defeated Lordgenome's army of Spiral warriors and overwhelmed his mind by explaining the nature of Spiral Nemesis to him, causing him to accept Antispiral's conditions for allowing the continuation of the human race. These were the installation of an Anti-Spiral factor within humanity's genetic code that would activate once Earth reached Spiral Energy Level 2, with the total human population at one million, converting its host into an Anti-Spiral "virtual program" that would carry out the mission to kill Earth's life to prevent Spiral Nemesis. When this failsafe activates, Nia becomes Antispiral's messenger and executes the "Human Extermination System", which is soon revealed to be the moon being set to collide with the planet and kill its life. Simon stops the collision by activating the moon, revealing the gigantic battleship Cathedral Terra, and Nia, having recovered part of her former self, states that mankind's survival of the Extermination has fated it to face Antispiral. Team Dai-Gurren gains possession of the Cathedral Terra and renames it to the Super Galaxy Dai-Gurren, using its systems to pinpoint Nia's whereabouts via Simon's connection with her to battle Antispiral at the source. However, before their arrival, Antispiral sets a decoy signal between the 10th and 11th dimensions to lure them into the Galactic Spiral Abyss, which they barely escape after Kittan sacrifices himself. Team Dai-Gurren rescues Nia and defeats Antispiral, with Simon killing him. In the series, Simon achieves this with help from Nia in Lagann; in the movie, Simon fights Antispiral before using his own blood to create a drill to land the killing blow. Antispiral refuses to accept that his race was wrong to restrict Spiral Power, but as he is dying, he asks Simon if Earth will now assume the responsibility of protecting the universe.

== Secondary characters ==
=== Team Gurren/Team Dai-Gurren ===
Team Gurren was first formed by Kamina in Giha Village; at the time, it consisted of a few boys from the village, as well as Simon and Kamina, who had attempted to reach the surface. After a failed attempt to reach the surface, the other three boys blame Kamina for the incident to avoid punishment, resulting in Kamina disowning them from Team Gurren. Simon and Kamina, along with Yoko, later reach the surface and travel to Littner Village. There, Kamina steals a Gunmen from a Beastmen and leaves to find the Gunmen base, along with Yoko and Leeron as the newest members of Team Gurren. Along the way, Team Gurren meets the Black Siblings, but they refuse to join.

Later on, Rossiu, Gimmy and Darry from Adai Village join Team Gurren, and they arrive at a local hot springs resort. There, Team Gurren meets the female members of the Black Siblings once more. The resort turns out to be a Beastmen-run Gunmen, and as the Black Siblings and Team Gurren work together to defeat them, the mysterious Old Coco joins them.

After the incident, Viral and the Dai-Gunzan meet Team Gurren and Gurren Lagann fights the fortress Gunmen. The Dai-Gunzan nearly defeats Simon and Kamina, but Dayakka rescues them while Kittan rescues the rest of Team Gurren. Simon tricks it into collapsing at the bottom of a ravine, and returns to find that people heard about Kamina stealing a Gunmen and decided to get their own, assembling to join Team Gurren, now renamed Team Dai-Gurren due to their abundance of new members. They later manage to steal the Dai-Gunzan, which becomes the team's new base of operations, but Kamina dies in the process. Under Simon's leadership, they decide to go to Teppelin and defeat the Spiral King.

Over time, many others join Team Dai-Gurren, including Nia and a large force of humans, who saw Simon's success in defeating Divine General Guame and joined their offensive against Teppelin.

The symbol of Team Dai-Gurren is a flaming red skull with Kamina's signature red sunglasses. After the timeskip, most members wear a simple 5-pointed star, as they have become key members of the Earth's new government. High-ranking members wear two stars in their chest, and Simon, being commander-in-chief, wears three. In the epilogue, Rossiu is shown to wear a large one on his back which is shaped similar to Simon's glasses; it could be an indication of his rank or the government's official logo.

==== Dayakka Littner ====
Voiced by: Daiki Nakamura (Japanese); John Gremillion (A.D. Vision dub), Doug Stone (Bang Zoom! dub) (English)

Personal Gunmen:

- Dayakkaiser
- Tengen Toppa Dai-Gurren (movie only)

Dayakka Littner (ダヤッカ・リットナー, Dayakka Rittonā) is the former leader of Littner Village, who abandoned his post after most of Littner joined Team Dai-Gurren. His Gunmen is the Dayakkaiser, but after the seizure of Dai-Gunzan, he acts as the captain of Dai-Gurren during battles while Kiyoh pilots the Dayakkaiser in his stead. After the timeskip, Dayakka is appointed the Minister of Food Affairs for Kamina City, and he and Kiyoh have married and are expecting a child. With the threat of the Anti-Spirals, Dayakka resigns his post and returns to his duties in Team Dai-Gurren.

==== Gimmy Adai ====
Voiced by: Takako Honda (Japanese); Greg Ayres (A.D. Vision dub), Brianne Siddall (Bang Zoom! dub) (English)

Personal Gunmen:

- Grapearl (Blue)
- Space Grapearl (Blue)
- Tengen Toppa Grapearl (movie only)
- Gurren Lagann (epilogue)

Gimmy Adai (ギミー・アダイ, Gimī Adai) is a boy from Adai Village, who Rossiu used to care for. His name seems to be similar to the Japanese word for 'right' (右 migi). When three new children were born into the village, the population exceeded its limit of 50, which mandated that two people be removed and sent to the surface. Since Gimmy and Darry had no parents, the village elder chose them to leave the village; however, Rossiu decided to go with them. The twins are very to close to each other, and were often left to their own devices around Dai-Gurren, except when they were with older girls, such as Yoko or Nia. After the timeskip, Gimmy and Darry become Grapearl pilots who often fight together. Gimmy tends to be more impulsive and reckless, which sometimes gets them in trouble. Throughout the series, he is shown to fear Leeron and distance himself when he flirts with others.

After Nia vanishes, Simon hands down Lagann's Core Drill to Gimmy. In the epilogue, he is seen alongside Darry as commanders of the Grapearl squad and the new pilots of Gurren Lagann.

==== Darry Adai ====
Voiced by: Shizuka Itō (Japanese); Hilary Haag (A.D. Vision dub), Mela Lee (Bang Zoom! dub) (English)

Personal Gunmen:

- Grapearl (Pink)
- Space Grapearl (Pink)
- Tengen Toppa Grapearl (movie only)
- Gurren Lagann (epilogue)

Darry Adai (ダリー・アダイ, Darī Adai) is a girl from Adai Village, who Rossiu used to care for. She is Gimmy's twin sister and is close to him. Her name seems to be similar to the Japanese word for 'left' (左 hidari). As a young girl, she was shy and quiet, clinging to a plush doll that she carried with her. After the timeskip, she has become more confident, careful, and calm, and puts more thought and planning into her actions than Gimmy.

In the epilogue, she is seen alongside Gimmy as commanders of the Grapearl squad and the new pilots of Gurren Lagann.

==== Kiyoh Bachika ====
Voiced by: Rina Satou (Japanese); Monica Rial (A.D. Vision dub), Karen Strassman (Bang Zoom! dub) (English)

Personal Gunmen:

- Dayakkaiser (anime only)

Kiyoh Littner (キヨウ・リットナー, Kiyō Rittonā) (born Kiyoh Bachika (キヨウ・バチカ, Kiyō Bachika)) is the oldest of Kittan's younger sisters. She possesses good combat abilities, as shown when she fights her way out of an enemy Gunmen. In the Parallel Work "Kittan Zero", she is shown wielding two yoyo like weapons. She helps out in Dai-Gurren's control room until she starts helping out on the front lines, piloting Dayakka's Dayakkaiser Gunmen, which she starts using when he starts commanding Dai-Gurren..

After the timeskip, Kiyoh and Dayakka have married and she gives birth to a daughter, whom she names Anne. Anne's birth causes the human population to reach one million, initiating the Human Extermination System.

In the manga she, Kittan, and her other sisters appear earlier in the story (during Team Gurren's time in Littner Village) and explains to Simon that their home village, Bachika, was destroyed by Viral.

==== Kinon Bachika ====
Voiced by: Kana Ueda (Japanese); Brittney Karbowski (A.D. Vision dub), Stephanie Sheh (Bang Zoom! dub) (English)

Kinon Bachika (キノン・バチカ, Kinon Bachika) is the second oldest of Kittan's younger sisters, who is seemingly the calmest and smartest of the Black Siblings. After Team Dai-Gurren's capture of Dai-Gunzan, she takes up a position within its control tower, monitoring the radar.

After the timeskip, she becomes one of Rossiu's main supporters. After Simon offers to protect the city with Gurren Lagann, even after being sentenced to death, Kinon volunteers to pilot Gurren, rigging herself with bombs in the cockpit and claiming that she would detonate them, killing herself and Simon, if he attempted to escape. It is later revealed that Kinon's decision to follow Rossiu, despite betraying Simon and ordering his execution, was a result of her feelings for him and her witnessing his struggles, with him having not done it for personal gain, but because circumstances forced him to.

After stopping Rossiu from committing suicide with help from Simon, she stays on Earth to aid him on the administration of Kamina City while Simon and the rest of Team Dai-Gurren go to face the Anti-Spirals.

==== Kiyal Bachika ====
Voiced by: Kana Asumi (Japanese); Kira Vincent-Davis (A.D. Vision dub), Gina Bowes (Bang Zoom! dub) (English)

Personal Gunmen:

- Kiyalunga

Kiyal Bachika (キヤル・バチカ, Kiyaru Bachika) is the youngest of the Black Siblings. Like Kiyoh, she helps out in Dai-Gurren's control room until she starts aiding in the frontlines piloting a customized Gunmen, Kiyalunga, which can transform into a shield and lance for Kittan's Gunmen, King Kittan, to wield.

After the timeskip, she lives with Dayakka and Kiyoh.

==== Old Coco ====
Voiced by: Nobuyuki Hiyama (Japanese); Tony Oliver (Bang Zoom! dub) (English)

Old Coco (ココ爺, Koko-jii) is a mysterious, silent old man who leads Team Gurren to the hot springs resort. Although he tricks them into entering the Beastmen's trap, he later helps Kamina by letting him onto the Beastmen Gunmen. He then gets caught up with Team Dai-Gurren and decides to follow them around, although nobody seems to notice him. The timeskip reveals he is a Beastmen who was in charge of taking care of Nia, and continued to do so even after she was no longer the princess of Teppelin.

Old Coco's voice is only heard when he greets Nia after she returns home and gives her the wedding dress he made.

==== Zorthy Kanai ====
Voiced by: Takafumi Kawakami (Japanese); Dan Woren (Bang Zoom! dub) (English)

Personal Gunmen:

- Sozoshin
- Space Sozoshin
- Tengen Toppa Sozoshin (movie only)

Zorthy Kanai (ゾーシィ・カナイ, Zōshī Kanai) is a new addition to Team Dai-Gurren, whose most recognizable trait is his smoking habit. His Gunmen is the Sozoshin. Zorthy is killed during the first deep space battle versus the Anti-Spirals. His death does not occur in the movie.

In the epilogue, a memorial site, in the form of a sword, is seen in his honor alongside Kamina and the other members of Team Dai-Gurren who sacrificed themselves.

==== Iraak Coega ====
Voiced by: Daisuke Kirii (Japanese); Doug Erholtz (Bang Zoom! dub) (English)

Personal Gunmen:

- Ainzer
- Space Ainzer
- Tengen Toppa Ainzer (movie only)

Iraak Coega (アイラック・コイーガ, Airakku Koīga) is a member of Team Dai-Gurren, who pilots a Gunmen named Ainzer that serves Yoko as a mobile rifle platform. Together, they assault Dai-Gunzan alongsaide Team Gurren. Iraak is killed during the first deep space battle versus the Anti-Spirals after he and Kidd attempt to avenge Zorthy. His death does not occur in the movie. In the manga, he and Kidd are a duo calling themselves "The Whirlwind brothers". In Gurren Gakuhen, he appears as part of Kittan's gang.

In the epilogue, a memorial site, in the form of a sword, is seen in his honor alongside Kamina and the other members of Team Dai-Gurren who sacrificed themselves.

==== Kidd Coega ====
Voiced by: Takashi Kondo (Japanese); Cutter Garcia (Bang Zoom! dub) (English)

Personal Gunmen:

- Kidd Knuckle
- Space Kidd Knuckle
- Tengen Toppa Kidd Knuckle (movie only)

Kidd Coega (キッド・コイーガ, Kiddo Koīga) is a new member of Team Dai-Gurren, whose Gunmen, the Kid Knuckle, wields dual pistols. Kid is killed during the first deep space battle versus the Anti-Spirals when he and Iraak attempt to avenge Zorthy's death. His death does not occur in the movie.

In the epilogue, a memorial site, in the form of a sword, is seen in his honor alongside Kamina and the other members of Team Dai-Gurren who sacrificed themselves. In the manga, he and his brother Ailaac form the "Whirlwind Brothers", which Kamina also calls the "Tornadoe Brothers". In Gurren Gakuhen, he appears as part of Kittan's gang.

==== Jorgun and Balinbow Bakusa ====
Balinbow Voiced by: Kouzou Douzaka (Japanese); Tony Oliver (Bang Zoom! dub) (English)
Jorgun Voiced by: Go Shinomiya (Japanese); Paul St. Peter (Bang Zoom! dub) (English)

Personal Gunmen:

- Twin Boukun
- Space Twin Boukun
- Tengen Toppa Twin Boukun (movie only)

Jorgun Bakusa (ジョーガン・バクサ, Jōgan Bakusa) and Balinbow Bakusa (バリンボー・バクサ, Barinbō Bakusa) are twin brothers who pilot the two-faced Gunmen, Twin Boukun. They sport differently coloured sunglasses, which can be used to tell them apart—Jorgun wears red shades while Balinbow wears blue ones. After the timeskip, they were appointed Directors of the Public Affairs Department, being responsible for the human population count. Jorgun and Balinbow are killed in the first deep space battle versus the Anti-Spirals after saving Gimmy and Darry. Their death does not occur in the movie.

In the epilogue, a memorial site, in the form of a sword, is seen in their honor alongside Kamina and the other members of Team Dai-Gurren who sacrificed themselves.

==== Makken Jokin ====
Voiced by: Katsuyuki Konishi (Japanese); Keith Silverstein (Bang Zoom! dub) (English)

Personal Gunmen:

- Moshogun
- Space Moshogun
- Tengen Toppa Moshogun (movie only)

Makken Jokin (マッケン・ジョーキン, Makken Jokin) is a silent man who is part of Team Dai-Gurren. His Gunmen, Moshogun, is based on an ancient samurai.

After the timeskip, Makken is married to Leite with three children. He is killed in the first deep space battle versus the Anti-Spirals after sacrificing himself to stop a large Anti-Spiral missile from destroying the Super Galaxy Dai-Gurren. His death does not occur in the movie.

In the epilogue, a memorial site, in the form of a sword, is seen in his honor alongside Kamina and the other members of Team Dai-Gurren who sacrificed themselves.

==== Attenborough Cortitch ====
Voiced by: Daisuke Kirii (Japanese); Derek Stephen Prince (Bang Zoom! dub) (English)

Attenborough Cortitch (アーテンボロー・コアチッチ, Ātenborō Koachicchi) is a hyperactive and impulsive man, who is the gunner of Dai-Gurren's control team and tends to fire at enemies without warning. After the timeskip, he joins Leeron's science team. After Team Dai-Gurren moves to Super Galaxy Dai-Gurren, he assumes the same position he had before at weapons control. It is also discovered that he joined Team Dai-Gurren after having "snuck into some bozo's luggage".

==== Tetsukan Littner ====
Voiced by: Takahiro Mizushima (Japanese); Tony Oliver (Bang Zoom! dub) (English)

Tetsukan Littner (テツカン・リットナー, Tetsukan Rittonā) is a member of the control team for Dai-Gurren, who is in charge of monitoring the condition of the ship. After the timeskip, he becomes part of Leeron's science team. In the "alternate universe" scenes in Episode 26, Tetsukan is seen sleeping in a bed with Cybela, implying that the two are in a relationship or that one or both of them desire to be. In the epilogue, he is seen working under Viral's command alongside Cybela.

==== Gabal Docker ====
Voiced by: Go Shinomiya (Japanese); Joe Ochman (Bang Zoom! dub) (English)

Gabal Docker (ガバル・ドッカー, Gabaru Dokkā) is Team Dai-Gurren's helmsman, who is in charge of Dai-Gurren's steering and maneuvering.

==== Leite Jokin ====
Voiced by: Takako Honda (Japanese); Julie Ann Taylor (Bang Zoom! dub) (English)

Leite Jokin (レイテ・ジョーキン, Reite Jōkin) is the chief engineer of Team Dai-Gurren and Leeron's direct subordinate. She is a skilled and ingenious mechanic, making her an ideal work partner for the naturally gifted Leeron. Her central duties revolve around maintaining Dai-Gurren's spiral engine, which appears to be less technologically sophisticated in Fortress-class Gunmen, and therefore requires additional fuel beyond spiral energy. Her personal trademarks are her lab coat and a cigarette she holds in her mouth.

In Part III, she becomes an important member of the supporting cast. She is married to Makken, who she affectionately calls "Oto-chan" or "Daddy", and the two have three children. Leite and Makken operate a small business servicing mechanical equipment and automotive vehicles, though they occasionally get contracts from the New Government to develop weapons. She and Makken have great faith in Simon and his capacity as a decision maker; their loyalty to him urges them to resist Rossiu by rebuilding the scrapped Gunmen of Team Dai-Gurren, refitting them with spiral weaponry capable of damaging Mugann. Leite also refits Gurren Lagann's power pack to allow it to reach escape velocity, but opts out of the Battle of Earth to stay with her children on the surface. After Team Dai-Gurren is reformed, she assumes her old post as engineer of the gang's flagship, the Super Galaxy Dai-Gurren. She eventually ends up as one of the fourteen pilots of Tengen Toppa Gurren-Lagann, battling Grand Zamboa to avenge Makken's death at the hands of Anti-Spiral Kantai and for the freedom of the entire galaxy.

In Anti-Spiral's parallel world illusion, her desired job appears to be an elementary school teacher, along with Lordgenome as principal.

=== Government ===
Most of Team Dai-Gurren have become part of the government, mostly as heads of departments managing the city or parts of the military. However, there are some new characters not seen before the timeskip, mainly found in Rossiu's Intelligence team.

==== Guinble Kite ====
Voiced by: Takahiro Mizushima (Japanese); Liam O'Brien (Bang Zoom! dub) (English)

Guinble Kite (ギンブレー・カイト, Ginburē Kaito), along with Kinon, is seemingly one of the more important members of Rossiu's intelligence team. He and Kinon often accompany Rossiu, and stay with him on Earth to watch over the city while the rest of Team Dai-Gurren headed into space for the final battle against the Anti-Spirals.

==== Cybela Coutaud ====
Voiced by: Haruhi Terada (Japanese); Mari Devon (series, Bang Zoom! dub), Amber Lee Connors (compilation films, Bang Zoom! dub) (English)

Cybela Coutaud (シベラ・クトー, Shibera Kutō) mainly works at a computer, where she communicates with Grapearls or does analysis tasks. She later joins Team Dai-Gurren and assumes a position at Super Galaxy Dai-Gurren's bridge. In the epilogue, she is seen still working there, now under Viral's command. Her name is an anagram of "shirabe", which means "to search".
