= List of Peacemaker Kurogane characters =

Peacemaker Kurogane (PEACE MAKER鐵, Pīsu Meikā Kurogane) (鐵 meaning Iron) is a historical fiction mangaseries written and illustrated created by Nanae Chrono (黒乃 奈々絵, Kurono Nanae). It is unrelated to the Peace Maker manga by Ryōji Minagawa. The story begins in 19th century Japan before the Meiji Restoration, a chain of events that led to enormous changes in Japan's political and social structure while the seeds of the revolution are being planted. The story follows the boy protagonist, Tetsunosuke Ichimura, who joins the Shinsengumi (initially as Toshizō Hijikata's page) while seeking strength to avenge his parents' death at the hands of a Chōshū rebel.

== Characters ==
=== Shinsengumi ===
Tetsunosuke Ichimura (市村 鉄之助, Ichimura Tetsunosuke)

- Voiced by: Yumiko Kobayashi (Japanese); Luci Christian (English), Kenta Suga (Drama TV)

The protagonist of Peacemaker Kurogane who was historically an actual member of the Shinsengumi. He is short, strong-willed and often underestimated by his peers. Tetsu also has a cheerful, active and competitive personality. He joins the Shinsengumi in order to become strong and to avenge the death of his parents at the hands of a member of the Chōshū clan, and ends up working as a page to Hijikata. At the time in 1864, Tetsu had psychogenic dwarfism and has not grown physically for two years due to his emotional scar. He has been more-or-less adopted as a mascot/little brother figure by the senior members of the Shinsengumi. He cries a lot.
Tatsunosuke Ichimura (市村 辰之助, Ichimura Tatsunosuke)

- Voiced by: Yuji Ueda (Japanese); Vic Mignogna (English), Yūta Furukawa (Drama TV)

Tatsu's over-protective, easily worried and rather high-strung older brother/guardian (also an actual member of the Shinsengumi). He is polite, soft spoken and down to earth. After the death of their parents, he had to take care of himself and his brother. He in accordance with his more pacifist outlook, works only as a bookkeeper for the Shinsengumi. He has tried to put all thoughts of revenge for his parents' deaths out of his mind, but convincing his younger brother to do the same is a little more difficult. Tatsu has a habit of apologizing for his little brother.
Sōji Okita (沖田 総司, Okita Sōji)

- Voiced by: Mitsuki Saiga (Japanese); Braden Hunt (English), Tomo Yanagishita (Drama TV)

The first unit captain of the Shinsengumi. He is deceptively delicate-looking and has an overall sunny disposition that occasionally borders on childishness, but displays frighteningly deadly skill in combat situations. He shares a strong bond with Hijikata and is also one of the only people who has a deep understanding of Tetsu. He takes Tetsu seriously and often practices with him. In addition, Okita loves children and is rarely seen without his piglet Saizo when he is off-duty. He is the Shinsengumi's best swordsman. Although he denies it, Okita is diagnosed with tuberculosis later in the series.
Toshizō Hijikata (土方 歳三, Hijikata Toshizō)

- Voiced by: Jouji Nakata (Japanese); Mike MacRae (English), Shinya Taniuchi (Drama TV)

The Shinsengumi's second vice commander, Hijikata hides his compassion behind a cold and ruthless front, and is known as "the demon of the Shinsengumi". A brilliant strategist and fighter, Hijikata's talent for battle is extraordinary. When dealing with enemies, his method is highly practical and often reckless. He counts Kondō, Yamanami, and Okita among his closest friends, and is a stern master to his page Tetsu. His hobby consists of writing haiku.
Sanosuke Harada (原田 左之助, Harada Sanosuke)

- Voiced by: Kenji Nomura (Japanese); Jason Douglas (English), Yūsuke Izaki (Drama TV)

The tenth unit captain and the best spear fighter in the Shinsengumi. Sanosuke is best friends with Nagakura Shinpachi and Todo Heisuke, forming a trio known as "The Three Comedians", whose chief hobby seems to be annoying Tetsunosuke. He has a scar on his stomach from a failed seppuku attempt and is very proud of it.
Shinpachi Nagakura (永倉 新八, Nagakura Shinpachi)

- Voiced by: Kappei Yamaguchi (Japanese); Greg Ayres (English), Naruki Matsukawa (Drama TV)

The second unit captain of the Shinsengumi. He introduces himself to Tetsu as "Sanosuke's keeper." Like Tetsu, he is often underestimated by his height (and young appearance – he looks like a child, but is actually in his 20s). In fact, he is extremely skilled with his sword and is a swordsman of Okita's level. He is also quite the joker, especially in conjunction with Sanosuke and Heisuke.
Heisuke Tōdō (藤堂 平助, Tōdō Heisuke)

- Voiced by: Kosuke Toriumi (Japanese); Nomed Kaerf (English), Yasuomi Sano (Drama TV)

The eighth unit captain of the Shinsengumi. Heisuke is the youngest member of Kondō's group and the youngest captain of the Shinsengumi. Since he has a slight infatuation with small, cute animals, he always calls Tetsunosuke "Puppy Boy" (much to Tetsu's dismay).
Hajime Saitō (斎藤 一, Saitō Hajime)

- Voiced by: Takashi Matsuyama (Japanese); Rob Mungle (English)

The third unit captain of the Shinsengumi. The droopy-eyed and soft-spoken Saitō has a supernatural ability to sense ghosts, spiritual auras (which unnerves many of the other members), and is able to perceive information about future events. He has an inexplicable camaraderie with Okita. Also considered the best swordsman of the Shinsengumi at the same level of Okita Souji.
Keisuke Yamanami (山南 敬助, Yamanami Keisuke)

- Voiced by: Norihiro Inoue (Japanese); Christopher Ayres (English), Ryuji Kamiyama (Drama TV)

The first vice commander of the Shinsengumi. Yamanami (often called "Sannan" by Kondō and Hijikata, which is an alternate reading of the kanji in his name) is a good-natured and thoughtful figure, providing a counterpoint to Hijikata's blunt and Machiavellian tendencies. He also loves children and takes a shine to Tetsunosuke. He is beloved by his fellow Shinsengumi members, and, like Hijikata, is firmly opposed to putting a sword in Tetsu's hands. He is carrying on a clandestine affair with a Shimabara courtesan named Akesato.
Isami Kondō (近藤 勇, Kondō Isami)

- Voiced by: Takaya Hashi (Japanese); John Swasey (English), Shozo Endo (Drama TV)

The commander of the Shinsengumi. Kondō is presented as a grandfatherly, slightly-clueless figure who is still fully aware of his and his organization's goals. He opposes Hijikata's mistreatment on Tetsunosuke.
Ayumu Yamazaki (山崎 歩, Yamazaki Ayumu)

- Voiced by: Yūko Nagashima (Japanese); Christine Auten (English), Mikie Hara (Drama TV)

The "den mother" of the Shinsengumi, Ayumu (most often known as "Ayu-nee", or "big sister Ayu") is the cook and housekeeper at the Shinsengumi compound. A pretty woman with a motherly nature, Ayumu is fully cognizant of what the people around her do for a living, and acts as a sort of big-sister figure to Tetsu. She is Susumu's older sister, and, like him, a shinobi. In one episode, she mentions them as being a part of the Oniwaban. While Susumu is based on the actual spy, Ayumu is a fictional character. She dies during the course of the story by the hands of the Choshū clansmen.
Susumu Yamazaki (山崎 烝, Yamazaki Susumu)

- Voiced by: Takahiro Sakurai (Japanese); Chris Patton (English), Tetsuji Sakakibara (Drama TV)

Ayumu's younger brother, Susumu is one of the Shinsengumi's spies, reporting directly to Hijikata. A skilled shinobi and information-gatherer, his nature emulates that of his superior's. He often cross-dresses (quite convincingly) to gather information.
Saizō (サイゾー)

- Voiced by: Mikako Takahashi (Japanese); Monica Rial (English)

Okita's piglet pet. He lives with his "family" at the Shinsengumi Headquarters. He also has a habit of chasing Tetsunosuke more often than anyone else.

=== Chōshū ===
Toshimaro Yoshida (吉田 稔麿, Yoshida Toshimaro)

- Voiced by: Jun'ichi Suwabe (Japanese); John Gremillion (English), Hirofumi Araki (Drama TV)

Based on the historical figure. A student of Shōin Yoshida, and a leader in the Chōshū clan, Yoshida is a master of military science. He is killed by Okita in episode 23 during the Ikedaya incident, while pointing a katana fragment held in his mouth at Tetsu.
Suzu Kitamura (北村 鈴, Kitamura Suzu)

- Voiced by: Yuka Imai (Japanese); Kevin Corn (English), Shuhei Nomura (Drama TV)

A fictional character. A follower of Yoshida, Suzu intends to avenge the death of his older brother at the hands of the Shinsengumi. He becomes Tetsu's friend without realizing that he is part of the Shinsengumi. He is driven to insanity after witnessing the decapitation of his master.
Akesato (明里)

- Voiced by: Michiko Neya (Japanese); Kira Vincent-Davis (English), Airi Nakajima (Drama TV)

Based on the actual person. A Shimabara courtesan, and a shinobi working for the Chōshū clan, Akesato is also Keisuke's lover. In the manga, it is stated by Sakamoto that she is mixed blood (half-Japanese and half-Caucasian); she has blonde hair (which she hides under a wig) and blue eyes. She is a member of the Fūma clan and acts as Susumu's rival in the series. (Note: the real Akesato was not of mixed blood and a shinobi.)
Hotaru (ほたる)

- Voiced by: Miyuki Sawashiro (Japanese); Jessica Boone (English)

A fictional character. A girl who has a crush on Okita. She becomes an assistant to Ayu, but later is revealed to be a spy for the Chōshū clan. She decides to quit being a spy, but ends up being tricked by Kichisaburo, thinking he is Okita. She frees Saitō, Hijikata, and Okita from the Eight Element Battle Formation without realizing it by peeling off the seals.

=== Others ===
Saya (沙夜)

- Voiced by: Mikako Takahashi (Japanese); Monica Rial (English), Fumi Takizawa (Drama TV)

A fictional character. She is mute and writes to communicate. Tetsu tends to relate to her because her parents were also murdered. She and Hana are "girls-in-training" under Akesato in the red light district. Saya is also Tetsu's love interest.
Hana (ハナ)

- Voiced by: Nanae Kato (Japanese); Nancy Novothy (English)

She and Saya are "girls-in-training" under Akesato. She is the polar opposite of Saya. Very loud, blunt, upbeat and caring in her own strange way. She dislikes katanas. Her dad was an umbrella maker and spoke loudly about honor. When her mother was sick, he did not sell his swords for a doctor. What happened to them is unknown but it is assumed that the mother died of the illness. She wants Tetsu to make her his new mother out of compassion. She has a big crush on Sanosuke after he saved her from thugs at a festival.
Ryōma Sakamoto (坂本龍馬, Sakamoto Ryōma)

- Voiced by: Masashi Ebara (Japanese); David Born (English)

Based on the actual visionary. An old acquaintance of Tatsu and Tetsu's father, Sakamoto refers to their father as the "Peacemaker". Sakamoto also calls Tatsu "Dragon Boy", as "Tatsu" can be translated to "Dragon" in Japanese and nicknames Tetsu "Iron Boy", as "Tetsu" can be translated as "Iron". He is an expert swordsman but he mainly uses a pistol. In the Japanese version of the anime and manga, Ryoma tends to speak random English words. Ryoma is also wanted by the pro-Shogunate forces, as revealed by Okita when he sneaks into the Shinsengumi headquarters. In Episode 9, the tune Sakamoto Ryōma whistles is actually that of The Star-Spangled Banner.
Kichisaburo (吉三郎)

- Voiced by: Mitsuki Saiga (Japanese); Braden Hunt (English)

Original character in the anime. He looks just like Sōji Okita in terms of appearance. He first appears before Maro entertaining him, he worked for Maro and impersonated Okita. After Hijikata, Saito and Okita invaded Maro's place and he was saved by Hotaru's ignorance, he was never seen again.
