= Don Rush =

American actor

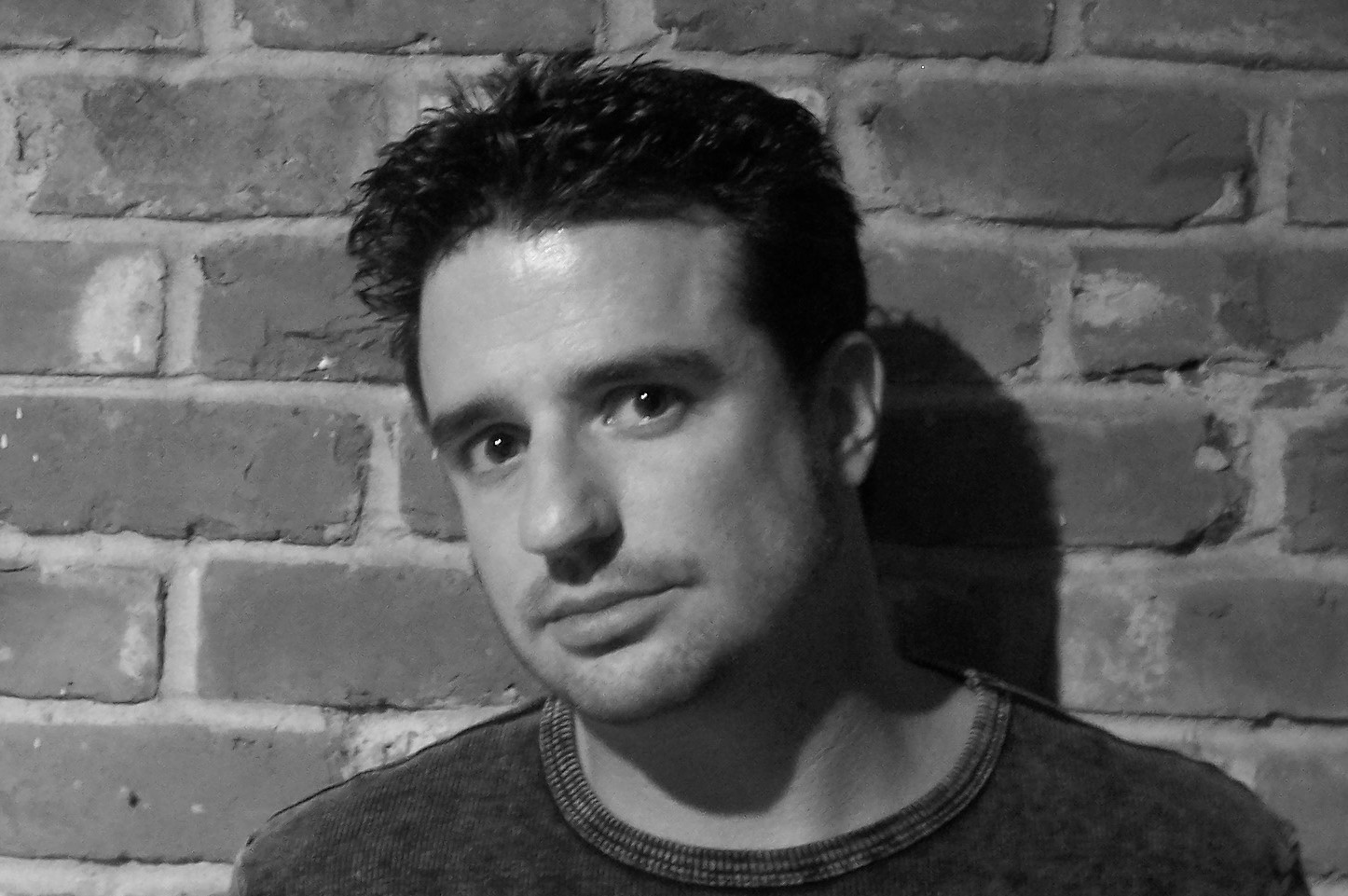
Don Rush

Don Rush is an American automated dialogue replacement (ADR) director, script writer, voice actor. and producer known for his work for ADV Films.

== Voice roles ==
- Azumanga Daioh - Nakku (Ep. 19), Additional Voices
- Azumanga Daioh: The Very Short Movie - Matsuyama
- Coyote Ragtime Show - Bonieck, Super Soul
- Dragon Knight - The Wheel of Time - Calveros
- Full Metal Panic! The Second Raid - Friday, Woo
- Full Metal Panic? Fumoffu - Issei Tsubaki, Sameshima (ep.3)
- Innocent Venus - Qing Lang
- Jinki:Extend - Hideo Koyatani
- Martian Successor Nadesico: The Motion Picture - Prince of Darkness - Sawada, Additional Voices
- Neo Ranga - Jirou Niimura
- Peacemaker Kurogane - Heisuke Toudou
- A Tree of Palme - Scruffy, Baron
- UFO Ultramaiden Valkyrie - Marduk
- Utawarerumono - Derihourai, Dii (Ep. 22)

== Production staff ==
=== ADR director ===
- Azumanga Daioh (co-directed with Sandra Krasa)
- Coyote Ragtime Show
- Full Metal Panic!
- Full Metal Panic? Fumoffu
- Full Metal Panic!: The Second Raid
- Innocent Venus (Eps. 1-4)
- Kekko Kamen
- Magical Shopping Arcade Abenobashi
- Nanaka 6/17
- Neo Ranga
- Peacemaker
- A Tree of Palme
- UFO Ultramaiden Valkyrie
- Utawarerumono
- Yumeria

=== Producer ===
- Azumanga Daioh
- Full Metal Panic!
- Full Metal Panic? Fumoffu
- Kekko Kamen
- Magical Shopping Arcade Abenobashi
- Neo Ranga
- Peacemaker
- A Tree of Palme'
- Yumeria

=== Script writer ===
- Coyote Ragtime Show
- Full Metal Panic!: The Second Raid
- Innocent Venus (Eps. 1-4)
- Kekko Kamen
- Neo Ranga
- Utawarerumono
