= A Tree of Palme =

- Theatrical poster
- Directed by: Takashi Nakamura
- Written by: Takashi Nakamura
- Produced by: Taro Maki
- Starring: Akiko Hiramatsu; Megumi Toyoguchi; Daisuke Sakaguchi; Yurika Hino
- Cinematography: Takashi Atsuhata
- Edited by: Shūichi Kakesu
- Music by: Takashi Harada
- Production companies: Palm Studio; Genco
- Distributed by: Toho Company (Japan); ADV Films (North America)
- Release date: March 10, 2002
- Running time: 136 minutes
- Country: Japan
- Language: Japanese

A Tree of Palme (Japanese: パルムの樹, Hepburn: Parumu no Ki) is a 2002 Japanese anime film, written and directed by Takashi Nakamura. It was an official selection of the 2002 Berlin Film Festival.

== Story ==
A Tree of Palme can be seen as a distant allusion of the 1883 novel The Adventures of Pinocchio by Carlo Collodi. It concerns a small puppet, Palme, who was tasked by his creator to look over his ailing wife, Xian. After her death, Palme is visited by a mysterious woman whom he mistakenly believes to be Xian. Shaken out of his sadness, Palme accepts her request to deliver something special to a far-off place known as Tama. This sets Palme off on a journey to discover his own emotions, and what it truly means to be human.

== Voice cast ==
Characters and cast
Character	Japanese cast	English cast
Palme	Akiko Hiramatsu	Kira Vincent-Davis
Popo	Megumi Toyoguchi	Jessica Boone
Shatta	Daisuke Sakaguchi	Chris Patton
Koram	Yurika Hino & Emi Motoi (young)	Allison Sumrall
Fou	Motomu Kiyokawa & Hiroshi Yanaka (young)	Andy McAvin
Xian	Kouka	Christine Auten
Pu	Mika Kanai	Tiffany Grant
Mu	Etsuko Kozakura	Monica Rial
Barron	Rikako Aikawa	N/A
Roualt	Kappei Yamaguchi	Michael Coleman
Daruyama	Mari Yokoo	Luci Christian
Gus	Unshou Ishizuka	John Swasey
Hota	Katsuhisa Houki	David Born
Baku	Takashi Nagasako	Mike Vance
Gyariko	Masashi Ebara	Chris Patton
Jamji	Ichirô Nagai	Jay Hickman
Zakuro	Isamu Tanonaka	John Swasey
Sawadust	Ryuuji Saikachi	Chris Ayres
Soma	Shōko Tsuda	Christine Auten
Gandel	Jouji Nakata	Mike MacRae
Guerilla Captain	Mugihito	John Gremillion
Woman Guerilla	Yuka Komatsu	Kelly Manison
Crickle	???	Mike MacRae
Pirate	Hiroko Ōnaka	Mike Yantosca
Juggler	Miyako Itō	Nancy Novotny
Scruffy	Kujira	Nomed Kaerf
Hat	???	Tyler Galindo
