= Mitsuki Saiga =

Japanese voice actress and singer (born 1973)

- 斎賀 みつき
- Born: June 12, 1973 (age 53); Saitama Prefecture, Japan
- Other name: Makoto Sato (佐藤まこと)
- Occupations: Voice actress; singer
- Years active: 1998–present
- Agent: Ken Production
- Height: 168 cm (5 ft 6 in)

Mitsuki Saiga (斎賀 みつき, Saiga Mitsuki; born June 12, 1973) is a Japanese voice actress affiliated with Ken Production. Her major roles include Maria Ross in Fullmetal Alchemist, Yoite in Nabari no Ou, Kuranosuke Koibuchi in Princess Jellyfish, Tiz Arrior in Bravely Default, Mòrag in Xenoblade Chronicles 2, Hibiki Shikyoin in PriPara and Solulu in Kiratto Pri☆Chan. Her deep and rich voice make her a versatile and fluid actress.

== Career ==
She started working as an actress at the age of 18. "But I didn't have any regular gigs," she told Newtype in 2003. By the time she was 20, she recalled, "I was lucky if I landed one role in six months – or even one audition a year," adding: "I didn't worry about it because I thought it was my learning period." She still got work, however small, and appreciated whatever job she could land, whether she had just "a single line" or many. "I was happy just to be in the recording studio," she continued. "I guess I was on the starting line, about to take the first step toward becoming a voice actress." Her career only truly took off with notable roles five years down the road when she turned 25. "Twenty – or rather, the twenties – is a time for polishing your skills. None of the experience you get during that time will be wasted, so it's a very meaningful period."

She won a Best Supporting Actress Award at the 2nd Seiyu Awards for her work in Moyasimon: Tales of Agriculture, Gurren Lagann, and Toward the Terra. She also won the Overseas Fan Award at the 4th Seiyu Awards for her portrayals of Wolfram in Kyo Kara Maoh! and Souji Okita in Peacemaker Kurogane. As the band Mitsuki Saiga feat. Just, she released several albums and singles that have charted on Oricon.

== Filmography ==
=== Television animation ===
List of voice performances in television
Year	Title	Role	Notes	Ref.
1998	Cowboy Bebop	Computer, Mascot		
1998	Futari Kurashi	Yukanoue Mai, Maten rouza		
1998	Ojarumaru	Jun Koshifubuki		
1999	Crest of the Stars	Samune		
1999	Microman: The Small Giant	Izam		
1999	Zoids: Chaotic Century	Raven		
1999	Karakurizōshi Ayatsuri Sakon	Boy		
1999	Shūkan Storyland ja:週刊ストーリーランド	Female member		
2000	Banner of the Stars series	Sobaash Üémh Dor Ïuth	Also II	
2000	Seikai no Danshō	Computer	OVA special	
2000	Amon: The Apocalypse of Devilman	Psycho Jenny	OVA	
2000	Hamtaro	Oscar Tsukishima		
2000	Inuyasha	Shintaro		
2000	Ghost Stories	Okabe-sensei	Ep. 5	
2001	Zoids: New Century	Jamie Hemeros		
2001	The SoulTaker	Kyosuke Tokisaka-Date		
2001	Geneshaft	Natalie Couto		
2001	Tantei Shounen Kageman	Sherlock Kurosawa		
2001	Shaman King	Amidamaru (young)		
2001	Mazinkaiser	Honoo Jun		
2001	Kasumin	Kiriko Kirino, Mashiro, Oniko		
2001	Cyborg 009: The Cyborg Soldier	Phil		
2001	Kai Doh Maru	Sakata no Kintoki		
2001–2002	Blood Shadow	Kureha	OVA Adult series, Eps. Darkness, Flame	
2002	Aquarian Age: Sign for Evolution	Nishi Arashiki		
2002	.hack//Sign	Tsukasa		
2002	Pita-Ten	Takashi Ayanokoji		
2002	Lightning Attack Express	AHR Rescue		
2002	Atashin'chi	Nasuo Arai, Oyamada		
2002	Gekkabijin	Kasumi Amamiya	OVA Adult series	
2002–2005	Jing: King of Bandits series	Jing	Also Seventh Heaven OVA	
2002	Monkey Typhoon	Gen		
2002	GetBackers	MakubeX		
2002	Pocket Monsters: Advanced Generation	Shu		
2003	Ashita no Nadja	Francis Harcourt, Keith Harcourt / Black Rose		
2003	Crush Gear Nitro	LT		
2003	E's Otherwise	Bud		
2003	Stellvia	Masaru Odawara		
2003	Croket!	Burrito		
2003	Triangle Heart: Sweet Songs Forever	Misato Mikami	OVA	
2003–2006	Megaman NT Warrior series	Enzan Ijuuin	Starting from Axxess	
2003–2004	Peacemaker Kurogane	Sōji Okita, Kichisaburo		
2003	Gilgamesh	Countess of Werdenberg (Hiroko Kageyama)		
2003	R.O.D the TV	Junior		
2004	Superior Defender Gundam Force	Zero		
2004	Fullmetal Alchemist	Maria Ross		
2004–2008	Kyo Kara Maoh! series	Wolfram von Bielefeld	3 seasons	
2004	Le Portrait de Petit Cossette	Eiri Kurahashi	OVA series	
2004	Fafner in the Azure: Dead Aggressor	Mamoru Koudate		
2004	Maria-sama ga Miteru: Printemps	Kei Katō		
2004	Onmyō Taisenki	Yamase		
2004	Viewtiful Joe	Jim		
2004	My-Hime	Chie Harada		
2004	Bleach	Zabimaru (monkey)		
2004–2007	Genshiken	Makoto Kousaka	Also Pt.2	
2004	Major	Takafumi Ando	1st series	
2005	MÄR	Phantom		
2005	The Law of Ueki	Robert Haydn		
2005	Strawberry 100%	Shiori Kurokawa, Junpei Manaka (child)	Also OVAs and specials	
2005	Loveless	Natsuo		
2005–2006	Cluster Edge	Vesuvia Valentino	TV series and OVAs	
2005	Black Cat	Lin Shaolee		
2005	Kotencotenco	Lou		
2005	My-Otome	Chie Hallard		
2005	Major	Takeshi Saotome (boy)	season 2	
2006	Wan Wan Celeb Soreyuke! Tetsunoshin	Tohru		
2006	Bakegyamon	Toshio Saegusa (London)		
2006	Ouran High School Host Club	Benio Amakusa		
2006	.hack//Roots	Yuuta / Kashimiya		
2006	The Good Witch of the West	Igraine Burnett	Also Astraea Testament	
2006	Sasami: Magical Girls Club	Amitav	Also 2nd season	
2006	Project Blue Earth SOS	Penny Carter		
2006	Tokimeki Memorial Only Love	Chairman's secretary		
2006	D.Gray-man	David		
2006–2007	My-Otome Zwei	Chie Hallard	OVA series	
2007	Deltora Quest	Dain		
2007	Getsumento Heiki Mina	Kanchi Hazemi		
2007	Ikki Tousen: Dragon Destiny	Chuutatsu Shibai		
2007	Moonlight Mile	Moera Jefferson	rLift Off and Touch Down	
2007	Gurren Lagann	Rossiu Adai		
2007	Darker than Black	Irene		
2007	Kōtetsu Sangokushi	Ling Tong		
2007	Toward the Terra	Jomy Marcus Shin		
2007	Emma: A Victorian Romance	Adele		
2007	Mushi-Uta	Homeroom teacher, Gluttony		
2007–2012	Shakugan no Shana	Johan	Starting from Second	
2007–2009	Shugo Chara! series	Kairi Sanjo	Also Doki, Party	
2007	Moyasimon: Tales of Agriculture	Kei Yūki		
2007	Ghost Hound	Kei Yakushi		
2008	Dazzle	Irija Hartnell イリージャ・バートネル		
2008	Itazura na Kiss	Kikyou Motoki		
2008	Nabari no Ou	Yoite		
2008	Monochrome Factor	Haruka Kujo		
2008	Naisho no Tsubomi	Yo Saegusa		
2008–2010	Sekirei	Haihane	Also Pure Engagement	
2008	Black Butler	Edward	Ep. 16	
2008–2009	Shikabane Hime	Mayo Jinsei	Also Kuro	
2008	Linebarrels of Iron	Reiji Moritsugu (boy)		
2008	Mobile Suit Gundam 00 Second Season	Revive Revival		
2009	Slap-up Party: Arad Senki	Raika		
2009–2014	Saki series	Sumiyo Fukabori, Sumire Hirose	Also Side-A and Nationals	
2009	07-Ghost	Teito Klein		
2009	Sora no Manimani	Teruko Sakai		
2009	Darker than Black: Gemini of the Meteor	Mina Hazuki		
2010	Ikki Tousen: Xtreme Xecutor	Kentei		
2010–2011	Metal Fight Beyblade series	Chi-Yun Li	Metal Masters and Metal Fury	
2010	Star Driver	Kou Atari/Needle Star		
2010	Princess Jellyfish	Kuranosuke Koibuchi		
2011	Bakugan Battle Brawlers: Gundalian Invaders	Stoica		
2011	Suzy's Zoo: Daisuki Witzy; Suzy's Zoo だいすき！ ウィッツィー	Patches		
2011	Ground Control to Psychoelectric Girl	Elliott	Ep. 8	
2011	Yu-Gi-Oh! Zexal	Kakeru Kunitachi		
2011–2012	Inazuma Eleven GO series	Takuto Shindou	Also Chrono Stone and Galaxy	
2011	Nura: Rise of the Yokai Clan: Demon Capital	Shokera		
2011	Sekai-ichi Hatsukoi	Editor-in-chief	season 2	
2012	Kuromajo-san ga Toru!!	Akira Hayami		
2012	Saki Achiga-hen episode of Side-A	Sumire Hirose		
2012	Moyasimon Returns	Kei Yūki		
2012	Tanken Driland	Harville		
2012	The Ambition of Oda Nobuna	Nagamasa Asai		
2012	Code:Breaker	Rui Hachiouji		
2012	Ixion Saga DT	KT		
2013	Cuticle Detective Inaba	Haruka Inaba		
2013	Chihayafuru 2	Makoto Yamai	2nd series	
2013	Beast Saga	Sianby		
2013	Duel Masters Victory V3	Zorosuta		
2013	Monogatari Series Second Season	Tora 虎		
2013	Devils and Realist	Solomon		
2014–2015	Future Card Buddyfight series	Kiyoru Kisaragi	Also 100and DDD	
2014	Saki: The Nationals	Sumire Hirose		
2014–2015	Minna Atsumare! Falcom Gakuen	Joshua Astray	Also SC	
2014	Strange+	Kyōya	Also Shin Strange+	
2014	Marvel Disk Wars: The Avengers	Akira Akatsuki		
2014	Bakumatsu Rock	Yoshinobu Tokugawa		
2014	Sengoku Basara: End of Judgement	Narrator		
2015	Yurikuma Arashi	Life Cool		
2015–2017	PriPara	Hibiki Shikyouin 紫京院ひびき	season 2 (Ep.50-89, (season 3) 102, 108–111, 113–115, 131 - 140)	
2015	Gintama°	Archbishop		
2015	Aikatsu!	Muleta Atsurō	season 3	
2016	Norn9	Sakuya Nijou		
2016	Super Lovers	Kiyoka	2 seasons	
2016	Snow White with the Red Hair	Umihebi	Season 2	
2016	Haven't You Heard? I'm Sakamoto	Matsuyama		
2016	Shōnen Maid	Hino Yuuji		
2016	Future Card Buddyfight DDD	Zanya Kisaragi	Season 3	
2016	Drifters	Nasu Suketaka Yoichi		
2016	Detective Conan	Kurusu Kiko	Ep.820	
2017	Akiba's Trip: The Animation	Tsukiyama Hoshino	Ep.12	
2017	Idol Time PriPara	Hibiki Shikyouin	Ep.22, 32,	
2017	Berserk	Mule Wolflame		
2017–present	Masamune-kun's Revenge	Gasou Kanetsugu	2 seasons	
2017	Atom: The Beginning	Dr.LOLO		
	Crayon Shin-chan	Mochida		
	Nintama Rantarō	Hikoshiro Imafuku		
2018	B: The Beginning	Izanami		
2018	Butlers: Chitose Momotose Monogatari	Shiratori Ren		
2018	Bakutsuri Bar Hunter	Kiba Samejima		
2018–2020	Muhyo & Roji's Bureau of Supernatural Investigation	Reiko Imai		
2019	Black Clover	Henry Legolant		
2019	Kakegurui ××	Miloslava Honebami		
2019–present	Welcome to Demon School! Iruma-kun	Opera		
2020–2021	Kiratto Pri☆Chan	Solulu		
2021–present	To Your Eternity	Hayase, Kahaku	2 seasons	
2021	Attack on Titan	Yelena		
2021	Q-Force	V	Japanese dub	
2021	Trolls: Holiday in Harmony	Queen Barb	Japanese dub	
2022	Requiem of the Rose King	Richard III		
2022	Made in Abyss: The Golden City of the Scorching Sun	Belaf		
2022	The Prince of Tennis II: U-17 World Cup	QP		
2022	Management of a Novice Alchemist	Ophelia Millis		
2023	Skip and Loafer	Nao		
2023–present	Jujutsu Kaisen	Uraume		
2023	Soaring Sky! Pretty Cure	Captain Shalala		
2023	Dark Gathering	God		
2024	The Dangers in My Heart	Yūki Suwa	Season 2 Episode 5	
2024	Pokémon Horizons: The Series	Chili (Rika)		
2024	Nina the Starry Bride	Hikami		
2025	Headhunted to Another World	Rampage King		
2025	Gachiakuta	Tamsy		
2025	Let's Play	Dee Parker		
2025	My Awkward Senpai	Ritsu Kankaiji		
2026	Witch Hat Atelier	Iguin		
2026	The Seven Knights of the Marronnier Kingdom	Zoe		
2026	Hotel Inhumans	Sekiya		
2027	Welcome to Demon School! Iruma-kun: IruMafia Edition	Opera		

=== Anime films ===
List of voice performances in films
Year	Title	Role	Notes	Ref.
1998	Slayers Gorgeous	Young Rick		
1999	Daigekisen! Microman VS Saikyō Senshi Gorgon	Izamu		
2000	Case Closed: Captured in Her Eyes	Nurse		
2002	Armitage III: Dual-Matrix	Julian Moore		
2002	Case Closed: The Phantom of Baker Street	Seiichiro Kikukawa		
2003	Go! Anpanman: Ruby's Wish	Pearl		
2004	Inuyasha the Movie: Fire on the Mystic Island	Kujaku		
2005	Megaman NT Warrior: Program of Light and Dark	Enzan Ijuuin		
2005	Fullmetal Alchemist: The Movie - Conqueror of Shamballa	Maria Ross		
2008	Gurren Lagann the Movie: Childhood's End	Rossiu Adai		
2009	Gurren Lagann The Movie: The Lights in the Sky are Stars	Rossiu Adai		
2010	Time of Eve	THX "Tex"		
2012	Inazuma Eleven Go vs. Danbōru Senki W	Takuto Shindo		
2016	PriPara Minna no Akogare Let's Go PriPari	Hibiki Shikyoin		
2017	PriPara the Movie: Everyone Shine! Kirarin Star Live	Hibiki Shikyoin		
2019	King of Prism: Shiny Seven Stars	Shine		
2023	Pretty Guardian Sailor Moon Cosmos The Movie	Chaos		
2024	Iris the Movie: Full Energy!!	Kuro Risu		
2025	Aikatsu! x PriPara The Movie: A Miracle Encounter!	Hibiki Shikyoin		

=== Tokusatsu ===
List of voice performances in tokusatsu
Year	Title	Role	Notes	Ref.
2009	Samurai Sentai Shinkenger	Ayakashi Utakasane	Ep. 20	

=== Video games ===
List of voice performances in video games
Year	Title	Role	Notes	Ref.
2001	Goemon: Shin Sedai Shūmei!	Yoshitsune	PS1/PS2	
2002	Card of Destiny Hikari to Yami Tougousha; Card of Destiny ～光と闇の統合者～	Lawrence Wistar	DC	
2002	.hack	Elk	Infection, Mutation, Outbreak, Quarantine	
2002–2004	Zoids Vs. series	Raven, Jamie		
2003	Usamimi delivery うさみみデリバリーズ！！	一乃蔵華麗	PC Adult	
2003	Star Ocean: Till the End of Time	Doctor	PS1/PS2	
2003	Mega Man Network Transmission	Chaud	GameCube	
2003	Simple 2000 series: Vol. 21: The Bishoujo Simulation RPG ~Moonlight Tale~; Simple 2000シリーズ Vol. 21 The 美少女シミュレーション RPG ～Moonlight Tale～	Eliza	PS1/PS2	
2003	Sore ga Bokura no Renai Seikatsu それが僕らの恋愛生活	Mitsuruyu Fujii, Restaurant owner	As Makoto Sato; PC Adult	
2003	Fantastic Fortune 2 ja:ファンタスティックフォーチュン2	Unisys Herschel	Also Triple Star in 2005	
2003	Samurai Shodown V	Yumeji Kurokouchi	PS1/PS2	
2003	Saya no Uta	Ryoko Tanbo	PC Adult	
2004	Stellvia	Masaru Odawara	PS1/PS2	
2004	Marionette: Ito Tsukai; Marionette～糸使い～DVD Edition	Akira Mikami	PC Adult	
2004	Demonbane	Colin, Kutougua, Itakua コリン / クトゥグア / イタクァ	PS1/PS2	
2004	Fullmetal Alchemist: Dream Carnival	Maria Ross	PS1/PS2	
2004	SD Gundam Force; SDガンダムフォース 大決戦！ 次元海賊デ・スカール！！	Zero, Zero Duel	PS1/PS2	
2005	Rumble Roses	Evil Rose		
2005	Invisible Sign: Isu invisible sign -イス-	Ayuri Jinnai, Makoto's mother	Also Isu Nemureruomori	
2005	Samurai Shodown VI	Yumeji Kurokouchi	Arcade	
2005	Suikoden Tactics	Seneka	PS2	
2005	Mizu no Senritsu ja:水の旋律	Yuu Shitara 設楽優	Also sequel 水の旋律2 ～緋の記憶～ in 2006	
2005	MÄr Heaven: Ärm Fight Dream	Phantom	PS1/PS2	
2006	Baten Kaitos Origins	Nasca		
2006	Black Cat: Kikai Jikake no Tenshi; Black Cat ～機械仕掛けの天使～	Lin Shaolee	PS1/PS2	
2006	.hack//G.U. Vol. 1: Rebirth	Endrance	PS1/PS2	
2006	Kishin Hishou Demonbane	二闘流（トゥーソード / トゥーガン） / コリン	PC	
2006	Hanakiso ja:花帰葬	Hanashiro, Kyūseishu Mirai, Hanako	PS1/PS2	
2006	Cluster Edge	Vesuvia Valentino	PS1/PS2	
2006	The Legend of Heroes: Trails in the Sky	Joshua Bright	Also Evolution	
2006	.hack//G.U. Vol. 2: Reminisce	Endrance	PS1/PS2	
2006	Tales of the Tempest	Lucius Bridges	DS	
2006	Jiritsu Kidou Sensha Izuna ja:自律機動戦車イヅナ	Izan Kitagawa	PC	
2007	Luminous Arc	Johannes	DS	
2007	Tales of Fandom Vol.2	Van Grants (18 years old)	PS1/PS2	
2007	The Legend of Heroes: Trails in the Sky SC	Joshua Bright		
2007	Gurren Lagann	Rossiu Adai	DS	
2008	Armored Core: For Answer	Julius Emery		
2008	Daylight: Asa ni Hikari no Kan wo Daylight -朝に光の冠を-	Minmi Zamitesu Akahata ミンミ・ザミテス・アカハーテ	PC	
2008	Tsu Poi Hitonatsu no Keiken 「っポイ！」 ひと夏の経験！？	Makoto Sagami	PS1/PS2	
2008	The Legend of Heroes: Trails in the Sky the 3rd	Joshua Bright		
2008	Asaki Yumemishi あさき、ゆめみし	Kagachi	PC	
2008	D.Gray-man Sosha no Shikaku; D.Gray-man 奏者ノ資格	David	PS1/PS2	
2008	Twinkle Crusaders	Shin Sakura	PC Adult. Also PSP GoGo version in 2010	
2008	Ikki Tousen: Eloquent Fist	Chuutatsu Shibai	PSP	
2008	Shugo Chara! Amu's Rainbow-Colored Character Change! ja:しゅごキャラ！ あむのにじいろキャラチェンジ	Kairi Sanjo	DS	
2008	Monochrome Factor Cross Road	Haruka Kujo	PS1/PS2	
2008	Real Rode	Ryuon	PS1/PS2	
2010	Last Escort: Club Katze	Kanade	PS2/PSP	
2012	Bravely Default	Tiz Arrior	Nintendo 3DS	
2013	The Legend of Zelda: A Link Between Worlds	Link, Ravio	Nintendo 3DS	
2013	Assassin's Creed IV: Black Flag	James Kidd / Mary Read	Japanese dub	
2013	Drakengard 3	Dito	PS3	
2014	CV ~Casting Voice~	Mizuki Sakura	PS3	
2015	Bravely Second: End Layer	Tiz Arrior	Nintendo 3DS	
2016	Overwatch	Zarya	Japanese dub	
2017	Fire Emblem Echoes: Shadows of Valentia	Kliff	Nintendo 3DS	
2017	Xenoblade Chronicles 2	Mòrag	Nintendo Switch	
2017	Senran Kagura Peach Beach Splash	Leo	PS4	
2018	Zanki Zero: Last Beginning	Zen Kubota	PS4/Vita	
2019	Super Smash Bros. Ultimate	Hero (XI)	Nintendo Switch	
2019	Dragon Quest XI S: Echoes of an Elusive Age	The Luminary, High Lama	Nintendo Switch/PS4/Xbox One/Windows	
2019	The Legend of Zelda: Link's Awakening	Link	Nintendo Switch	
2019	Onmyoji	Onikiri Reforged (天劍韌心鬼切)	Android / IOS	
2019	BlackStar - Theatre Starless	Mokuren	Android / IOS	
2021	Pokémon Masters EX	Elio (Japanese language: ヨウ Yō)	Android / IOS	
2023	Street Fighter 6	Marisa		
2024	The Legend of Zelda: Echoes of Wisdom	Link	Nintendo Switch	
2025	Shuten Order	Rei Shimobe/The Founder	Nintendo Switch / Steam	
2025	Umamusume: Pretty Derby	Byerley Turk	Android / IOS / Steam	

=== Overseas dubbing ===
Title	Role	Voice dub for	Notes	Ref.
Black Panther	Okoye	Danai Gurira		
Avengers: Infinity War	Okoye	Danai Gurira		
Avengers: Endgame	Okoye	Danai Gurira		
Black Panther: Wakanda Forever	Okoye	Danai Gurira		
Marvel Zombies	Okoye	Kenna Ramsey		
.45	Vic	Sarah Strange		
Asylum	String	Cody Kasch		
Bachelor Party 2: The Last Temptation	Tommy	Max Landwirth		
Barbie	President Barbie	Issa Rae		
Boy Meets World	Lemke	Lukas Jackson	"Back 2 School"	
Carmen Sandiego	Player	Finn Wolfhard	Animation	
Cradle 2 the Grave	Daria	Gabrielle Union		
Emma's Chance	Susan Peirce	Missi Pyle		
Girls	Jessa Johansson	Jemima Kirke		
Hearts in Atlantis	John "Sully" Sullivan	Will Rothhaar		
The Last Days on Mars	Kim Aldrich	Olivia Williams		
Love, Death & Robots	Martha Kivelson	Mackenzie Davis	Animation	
Love Island	Justine Ndiba			
No Time to Die	Nomi	Lashana Lynch		
Only Murders in the Building	Alice Banks	Cara Delevingne		
Predestination	Jane/John	Sarah Snook		
Red Dawn	Toni Walsh	Adrianne Palicki		
Soccer Dog: The Movie	Vince	Kyle Gibson		
Steven Universe	Garnet	Estelle	Animation	
The Strain	Dutch Velders	Ruta Gedmintas		
Valerian and the City of a Thousand Planets	Emperor Haban Limaï	Elizabeth Debicki		
Young Sheldon	George Cooper Jr.	Montana Jordan		

== Discography ==
=== Albums ===
List of albums, with selected chart positions
Title	Album information	Oricon
Title	Album information	Peak position
One; Mitsuki Saiga feat. Just	Released: November 27, 2008; Label: Marine Entertainment; Catalog No.: MMCC-4165	121
Just go ahead! Mitsuki Saiga feat. Just	Released: May 26, 2010; Label: Marine Entertainment; Catalog No.: MMCC-4225	97
Divine Chair; Mitsuki Saiga feat. Just and Elekiter Round φ	Released: May 11, 2011; Label: Marine Entertainment; Catalog No.: MMCC-4262	156
Run! Mitsuki Saiga feat. Just and Wataru Hatano	Released: May 25, 2011; Label: Marine Entertainment; Catalog No.: MMCC-4264	165
Utakata Blackbird (泡沫Blackbird); Mitsuki Saiga feat. Just and Takuma Terashima	Released: August 24, 2011; Label: Marine Entertainment; Catalog No.: MMCC-4266	120
Just Best Album Seven; Mitsuki Saiga feat. Just	Compilation album; Released: Just 4, 2012; Label: Marine Entertainment; Catalog No.: MMCC-4322	256

=== Character albums ===
List of character singles and albums, with selected chart positions
Title	Album information	Oricon
Title	Album information	Peak position
The Law of Ueki Character Single: Higher (「うえきの法則」キャラクターソングシングル:Higher); Robert Haydn (Mitsuki Saiga)	Released: September 7, 2005; Label: Avex Trax; Catalog No.: AVCA-22378	–
Character Song Series vol. 3 Sir Wolfram von Bielefeld (今日からマ王!キャラクターソングシリーズ vol. 3 フォンビーレフェルト卿 ヴォルフラム); Wolfram (Mitsuki Saiga)	Released: December 21, 2005; Label: Marine Entertainment; Catalog No.: MMCC-4086	113

=== Singles ===
List of singles, with selected chart positions
Title	Single information	Oricon	Album
Title	Single information	Peak position	Album
"Heart shaped killing emotion" Mitsuki Saiga feat. Just	Released: June 22, 2008; Label: Marine Entertainment; Catalog No.: MMCC-4161	150	One
"Enkaminari (縁雷~EN~RAI~)"; Mitsuki Saiga feat. Just	Released: November 27, 2008; Label: Marine Entertainment; Catalog No.: MMCC-4178	133	Just go ahead!
"Phantom"; Mitsuki Saiga feat. Just; Opening theme song for 07-Ghost	Released: December 23, 2009; Label: Marine Entertainment; Catalog No.: MMCC-4194	55	Just go ahead!
"Voice"; Mitsuki Saiga feat. Just	Released: January 27, 2011; Label: Marine Entertainment; Catalog No.: MMCC-4248	144	Just Best Album Seven

=== Audio dramas ===
List of voice performances in audio recordings
Title	Role	Notes	Source
Eirēnē no hitomi shindobaddo 23-sei no bōken エイレーネーの瞳 シンドバッド23世の冒険	Selma	Radio	
Cinematic Sound Drama GetBackers series	MakubeX	Drama CD	
07-Ghost	Teito Klein	Drama CD	
Grand Stage		Drama CD	
Hatoful Boyfriend	Nageki Fujishiro	Drama CD	
Higurashi no naku koro ni Kai: meakashi-hen ドラマCD ひぐらしのなく頃に解 目明し編	Satoshi Hojo	Drama CD	
Sā koi ni ochi Tamae さあ恋におちたまえ	Susumu Sakashita	Drama CD	
Splendide Shana	Johan	Talk CD	
Superiority Shana	Johan	Talk CD	
Sound Theater Rainbowman サウンドシアター レインボーマン	Zhang Yulin	Drama CD	
Requiem of the Rose King	Richard III	Drama CDs	
