= Greg Ayres =

American voice actor (born 1968)

- Born: December 7, 1968 (age 57); Richmond, Virginia, U.S.
- Occupations: Voice actor, DJ
- Years active: 1998–present
- Relatives: Christopher Ayres (brother)
- Website: gregayres.com

Greg Ayres (born December 7, 1968) is an American voice actor known for his work on English dubs of Japanese anime series. His notable voice roles include Hideki in Nerima Daikon Brothers, Koyuki Tanaka in Beck: Mongolian Chop Squad, Son Goku in Saiyuki, Clear in Dramatical Murder, Takaya Abe in Big Windup!, Chrono in Chrono Crusade, Yuu Nishinoya in Haikyu!!, Denmark in Hetalia: Axis Powers, Kaoru Hitachin in Ouran High School Host Club, Kouichi Sakakibara in Another, Sorata Kanda in The Pet Girl of Sakurasou, Negi Springfield in Negima, Kenta Nakamura in Initial D, Heihachi Hayashida in Samurai 7, Taichi Yaegaeshi in Kokoro Connect, Frost in Dragon Ball Super, Tomoki Sakurai in Heaven's Lost Property and Leo Kakinoki in Ghost Stories.

Outside of voice acting, he has worked as a nightclub DJ and performs as such at anime conventions.

== Personal life ==
Ayres is gay.

== Filmography ==
=== Film ===
List of voice performances in direct-to-video and television films
Year	Title	Role	Notes	Source
2005	Lady Death: The Motion Picture	Young Man		

=== Dubbing roles ===
==== Anime ====
List of English dubbing performances in anime
Year	Title	Role	Notes	Source
1998	Those Who Hunt Elves	Legendary Sorcerer		
2002	Steel Angel Kurumi	Captain, Mikhail	Anime debut	
2003	Neo Ranga	Captain, Mikhail		
2003	Aura Battler Dunbine	Fuei		
2003	Super GALS!	Yuya Asou		
2003	Saint Seiya	Daichi, Tatsuya	ADV dub	
2003	Pretear	Mannen		
2003	Legend of the Mystical Ninja	Hattarino, Sasuke		
2003–22	Saiyuki series	Son Goku		
2003–05	Full Metal Panic! series	Shinji Kazama		
2004	Neon Genesis Evangelion	Kaworu Nagisa	Director's Cut	
2004	Case Closed	Felix		
2004	Puni Puni Poemy	Scooter Thief, Ball Person 1		
2004	Azumanga Daioh	Male student 2, others		
2004	BASToF Syndrome	Bomb		
2004	Megazone 23	Various characters	OVA series	
2004	Gravion series	Toga Tenkuji	Also Zwei	
2004	Conduct Zero	Various characters		
2004	Nurse Witch Komugi	Giant Mona, others		
2004	Aquarian Age: Sign for Evolution	Junichi Kojima		
2004	Chrono Crusade	Chrono		
2004	Yesterday	Ah-zhou		
2004	Peacemaker Kurogane	Shinpachi Nagakura		
2004	Sister Princess	Taro Yamada		
2004	Fullmetal Alchemist	Bido		
2004	D.N.Angel	Satoshi Hiwatari		
2004	Cyber Team in Akihabara	Tetsuro, The White Prince		
2004	Spiral	Kousuke Asazuki		
2005	Gantz	Hajime Muroto, others		
2005	Divergence Eve	Nodera, others		
2005	Cromartie High School	Hokuto's Lackey, others		
2005	Burst Angel	Kyohei Tachibana		
2005	Gunslinger Girl	Emilio		
2005	Initial D	Kenta Nakamura	Funimation dub	
2005	My Beautiful Girl Mari	Additional Voices	Film	
2005	Jungle Juice	Bearded Dealer	Live-action	
2005	Kodocha	Tsuyoshi Ohki		
2005	Samurai 7	Hayashida Heihachi		
2005	Godannar	Shinobu		
2005	Mythical Detective Loki Ragnarok	Heimdall/Kazumi Higashiyama		
2005	Ghost Stories	Leo Kakinoki		
2005	Hakugei: Legend of the Moby Dick	Additional Voices		
2006	Misaki Chronicles	Lt. Nodera, Seabase staff, others		
2006	Macross	Loli Dosel		
2006	Kaleido Star: New Wings	Andy		
2006	Princess Tutu	Various characters		
2006	Diamond Daydreams	Haruto		
2006	Desert Punk	Mitsuru		
2006	UFO Ultramaiden Valkyrie	Kazuto Tokino		
2006	Negima!	Negi Springfield		
2006	Vermillion Pleasure Night	Blue Face		
2006	Speed Grapher	Tsujido		
2006	This Ugly Yet Beautiful World	Kuon		
2006	Crayon Shin-chan	Passing older brother		
2006	Trinity Blood	Pope Alessandro XVIII		
2006	Nerima Daikon Brothers	Hideki		
2006	Shadow Skill	Gau Ban		
2007	Utawarerumono	Nuwangi		
2007	Air Gear	Onigiri		
2007	Heroic Age	Mehitak Pore		
2007	BECK: Mongolian Chop Squad	Yukio "Koyuki" Tanaka		
2007	Tsubasa: Reservoir Chronicle	Masayoshi		
2007	Mushishi	Kaji	Ep. 16	
2007	Innocent Venus	Gora		
2007	Xenosaga: The Animation	Jr.		
2007	Welcome to the NHK	Kaoru Yamazaki		
2007	Glass Fleet	Nowy		
2007–08	School Rumble	Kazuya Tanaka		
2008	Kanon	Jun Kitagawa	Based on 2006 TV series	
2008	xxxHolic	Boy	Ep. 24	
2009	Big Windup!	Takaya Abe		
2009	Nabari no Ou | |Gau Meguro			
2009–present	One Piece	Sentomaru	Funimation dub	
2010–11	Clannad series	Youhei Sunohara	Also movie and After Story	
2010	Ouran High School Host Club	Kaoru Hitachiin		
2010	Strike Witches	Various characters	Ep. 11	
2010	Dragon Ball Z Kai	Guldo	Ep. 28	
2010	Golgo 13	Bum	Ep. 2	
2010	Legends of the Dark King	Gion, Komaku, Thug 3		
2010	Tears to Tiara	Rathy		
2010	Oh! Edo Rocket	Seikechi Tayama		
2011	No. 6	Shion		
2011	Demon King Daimao	Hiroshi Miwa		
2011	Coicent	Specs		
2011	Five Numbers!	N17 (Young Man)		
2011	Angel Beats!	Ayato Naoi		
2011	Baka and Test	Kouta Tsuchiya		
2011	Heaven's Lost Property	Tomoki Sakurai		
2011	Night Raid 1931	Aoi Miyoshi		
2012	Love, Chunibyo & Other Delusions	Makoto Isshiki		
2012	Hakuoki	Heisuke Toudou		
2012	Yamada's First Time: B Gata H Kei	Kosuda's Eros Deity		
2012	Broken Blade	Rygart Arrow		
2012	Deadman Wonderland	Ganta Igarashi		
2012	Fairy Tail	Shô		
2012	Medaka Box	Myouri Unzen		
2013	Colorful	Makoto Kobayashi	Film	
2013	Kokoro Connect	Taichi Yaegeshi		
2013	Another	Koichi Sakakibara		
2013	Little Busters!	Masato Inohara		
2014	From the New World	Satoru Asahina		
2014	Hakkenden: Eight Dogs of the East	Shino Inuzuka, Murasame		
2014	Majestic Prince	Klein		
2014	Hetalia: The Beautiful World	Denmark	Replaced Montgomery Sutton	List of Hetalia: Axis Powers characters
2014	Log Horizon	Tohya		
2014	Love Stage!!	Izumi Sena		
2014	Danganronpa: The Animation	Monokuma		
2014	Devil Survivor 2: The Animation	Daichi Shijima		
2015	Free!: Iwatobi Swim Club	Nagisa Hazuki		
2015	Gangsta	Doug		
2016	Danganronpa 3: The End of Hope's Peak High School	Monokuma	Future Arc only	
2016	The Disastrous Life of Saiki K.	Amp		
2016	Haven't You Heard? I'm Sakamoto	Yoshinobu Kubota		
2016	Drifters	Minamoto no Yoshitsune		
2016	Puzzle & Dragons X	Sturgeon		
2017–25	My Hero Academia	Kōji Kōda		
2017	Food Wars! Shokugeki no Soma	Zenji Marui		
2017	Dragon Ball Super	Frost, Guldo		
2017	Haikyu!!	Yu Nishinoya		
2017	Diabolik Lovers	Azusa Mukami		
2018	UQ Holder!	Negi Springfield		
2018	Concrete Revolutio	Jiro Hitoyoshi		
2018	Black Clover	Neige		
2020	The Pet Girl of Sakurasou	Sorata Kanda		
2021	Getter Robo Arc	Professor Shikishima		
2021	The Slime Diaries	Zegion	Based on the spin-off manga	
2022	Shenmue	Chai		
2022	Vermeil in Gold	Bro		
2022	The Eminence in Shadow	Po		
2023–24	The Dangers in My Heart	Kanzaki		
2024	The Vexations of a Shut-In Vampire Princess	Mellaconcey		
2025	Loner Life in Another World	Nerd C		
2025	Rock Is a Lady's Modesty	Yu		

==== Film ====
List of English dubbing performances in direct-to-video and television films
Year	Title	Role	Notes	Source
2005	Saiyuki: Requiem	Son Goku		
2006	Fullmetal Alchemist the Movie: Conqueror of Shamballa	Bido		
2008	Evangelion: 1.0 You Are (Not) Alone	Kensuke Aida		
2011	Evangelion: 2.0 You Can (Not) Advance	Kensuke Aida		
2012	Towa no Quon	Kai		
2012	Sengoku Basara: The Last Party	Uesugi Kenshin		
2021	Gintama: The Very Final	Kamui		

==== Video games ====
List of English dubbing performances in video games
Year	Title	Role	Notes	Source
2003	Unlimited Saga	Roy		
2009	Lux-Pain	Shinji Naruse		
2010	Dragon Ball Z: Tenkaichi Tag Team	Guldo		
2010	Dragon Ball: Raging Blast 2	Guldo		
2014	Dragon Ball Z: Battle of Z	Guldo		
2015	Dragon Ball Xenoverse	Guldo		
2016	Dragon Ball Xenoverse 2	Guldo, Frost		
2018	Dragon Ball FighterZ	Guldo		
2018	Dragon Ball Legends	Guldo, Frost		
2020	Dragon Ball Z: Kakarot	Guldo		
