= Peacemaker Kurogane =

Japanese manga series

- First English edition of Peacemaker Kurogane, published by ADV Manga

PEACE MAKER鐵 (Pīsu Meikā Kurogane)
- Genre: Historical, samurai
- Manga

Peace Maker
- Written by: Nanae Chrono
- Published by: Enix (former); Mag Garden
- English publisher: AUS: Madman Entertainment; NA: Tokyopop (former)
- Magazine: Monthly Shōnen Gangan
- Original run: April 12, 1999 – August 11, 2001
- Volumes: 6
- Manga
- Written by: Nanae Chrono
- Published by: Mag Garden
- English publisher: NA: ADV Manga (former); Tokyopop (former)
- Magazine: Monthly Comic Blade (2001–July 2014); Monthly Comic Garden (September 2014–present)
- Original run: 2001 – present
- Volumes: 17
- Anime television series
- Directed by: Tomohiro Hirata
- Produced by: Naomi Nishiguchi; Akio Matsuda; Yūsuke Abe; Yōko Kawahara; Shūji Ono; Sumihiro Kamitamari
- Written by: Nahoko Hasegawa
- Music by: Keiichi Oku
- Studio: Gonzo
- Licensed by: AUS: Madman Entertainment; NA: Funimation; UK: Anime Limited
- Original network: TV Asahi, TV Kanagawa
- English network: NA: Anime Network; US: Showtime Beyond; ZA: Animax
- Original run: October 7, 2003 – March 24, 2004
- Episodes: 24
- Anime film

Part 1: Belief; Part 2: Friend
- Directed by: Shigeru Kimiya
- Produced by: Kazuhiko Hidano; Sachi Kawamoto; Satoshi Fukao; Noritomo Isogai; Tetsuya Kakita; Haruka Kakuya; Yōko Shiraishi; Shigeto Takeyama; Fumihiro Andō
- Written by: Eiji Umehara
- Music by: Ryosuke Nakanishi
- Studio: White Fox
- Released: June 2, 2018 (part 1); November 17, 2018 (part 2)
- Runtime: 109 minutes (total)

Peace Maker Kurogane (Japanese: PEACE MAKER鐵, Hepburn: Pīsu Meikā Kurogane) is a Japanese manga series written and illustrated by Nanae Chrono. It is unrelated to the Peace Maker manga by Ryōji Minagawa. The story begins in 19th century Japan before the Meiji Restoration, a chain of events that led to enormous changes in Japan's political and social structure while the seeds of the revolution are being planted. The story follows the boy protagonist, Tetsunosuke Ichimura, who joins the Shinsengumi (initially as Toshizō Hijikata's page) while seeking strength to avenge his parents' death at the hands of a Chōshū rebel.

It is a sequel to Shinsengumi Imon Peace Maker (新撰組異聞PEACE MAKER, Shinsengumi Imon Pīsu Meikā), which was published by Enix in the magazine Monthly Shōnen Gangan. Shinsengumi Imon Peace Maker was licensed in North America by Tokyopop.

== Plot ==
The story is focused on the main character, Tetsunosuke Ichimura, who is an energetic, short and very childlike fifteen-year-old (16 in the manga). He and his older brother Tatsunosuke are left to fend for themselves after the vicious murder of their parents. While Tetsunosuke wants to get revenge, his pacifist brother is not so inclined. "Tatsu" joins a special police force dubbed the Shinsengumi, as an accountant to earn a living, his brother "Tetsu" wishes to join as a soldier to seek his revenge. The story chronicles Tetsu's trials and tribulations as a struggling page craving redemption. He develops relationships with all the legendary members of the Shinsengumi army helping them with their various struggles as he constantly battles his own against himself. At the story's climax, Tetsu discovers himself and the overwhelming responsibility the power he is searching for holds.

== Media ==
=== Manga ===
==== Peace Maker ====
Peace Maker (Shinsengumi Imon Peace Maker (新撰組異聞PEACE MAKER, Shinsengumi Imon Pīsu Meikā)) was published from April 12, 1999, to August 11, 2001, in Japan by Enix magazine Monthly Shōnen Gangan and was compiled in six volumes by Enix.

The sequel to Peace Maker transferred to Mag Garden's Monthly Comic Blade. Mag Garden republished Peace Maker in five tankōbon volumes on September 10, 2005.

Mag Garden edition was licensed and published in North America and Germany by Tokyopop. Tokyopop released Peace Maker's five tankōbon volumes between August 14, 2007, and November 4, 2008. Later, Tokyopop re-released the manga through Madman Entertainment. The first volume was released on November 10, 2008. The second was released on February 10, 2009. Tokyopop Germany released the manga's five tankōbon volumes between December 2005 and June 28, 2006. The manga was also licensed and published in Italy by Star Comics and in France by Kami. Kami released the manga's five tankōbon volumes between September 20, 2006, and July 11, 2007.

==== Peace Maker Kurogane ====
Peace Maker Kurogane itself was started as a new series in Mag Garden's Monthly Comic Blade in 2001 and transferred to Monthly Comic Garden in 2014. Mag Garden released the manga's first tankōbon volume on October 10, 2002.

Peacemaker Kurogane was licensed by ADV Manga, which released three volumes between October 4, 2004, and March 22, 2005, before putting it on hold indefinitely. After the license lapsed, Tokyopop acquired it and released the manga's first volume on March 10, 2009. It released four volumes in total. The manga was licensed and published in France by Kami, in Germany by Tokyopop, and in Russia by Comics Factory. Tokyopop Germany released the manga's first five tankōbon volumes between June and October 2005.

=== Anime ===
An anime television series adaptation by Gonzo and produced by Geneon ran for 24 episodes, which aired on TV Asahi between October 7, 2003, and March 24, 2004. The US license for the anime is held by ADV Films under the title Peacemaker. The anime mostly follows the plot of the original manga Peace Maker, but also introduces characters that are only shown in Peacemaker Kurogane. The anime aired in the United States on Showtime Beyond, alongside Chrono Crusade. On June 25, 2010, anime distributor Funimation Entertainment announced on their online panel FuniCon 4.0, that they have acquired rights to the series along with 3 other ADV title, after ADV's shutdown in 2009. The anime was broadcast in France by Déclic-Images. It was broadcast in Spain by Buzz Channel. It was broadcast in Saudi Arabia by Space Power and in the Philippines by QTV and Hero.

The anime uses two pieces of theme music. "You Gonna Feel" by Hav is the opening theme, while "Hey Jimmy!" by Hav is the ending theme of the anime.

Gonzo Digimation released the anime's seven DVDs between December 21, 2003, and June 25, 2004. Gonzo Digimation released the DVD box set, containing all 7 DVDs, on December 22, 2004. ADV Films released the anime's seven DVDs between September 14, 2004, and September 13, 2005. ADV Films released the DVD box set, containing all 7 DVDs, on November 15, 2005.

On April 14, 2016, it was announced that the manga would receive a new anime adaptation, which was later confirmed to be a two-part anime film that adapted a later arc of Peacemaker Kurogane. It is directed by Shigeru Kimiya and written by Eiji Umehara, with animation produced by White Fox and character designs by Sayaka Koiso. The first part titled Peacemaker Kurogane: Belief (PEACE MAKER 鐵 ～想道～, Pīsu Meikā Kurogane: Omou-michi) premiered in Japan on June 2, 2018. The second part titled Peacemaker Kurogane: Friend (PEACE MAKER 鐵 ～友命～, Pīsu Meikā Kurogane: Yūmei) premiered on November 17, 2018.

=== Drama and animation CDs ===
On December 21, 2003, Geneon released an animation soundtrack CD for Peacemaker Kurogane. Geneon released a set of 5 Drama CDs for Peacemaker Kurogane. The first CD was released on December 21, 2003, the second CD on January 23, 2004, the third CD on February 25, 2004, the fourth CD on March 21, 2004 and the fifth CD on April 23, 2004. The songs were sung by Mitsuki Saiga, Yuka Imai, Joji Nakata, Takaya Toshi, Junichi Suwabe, Kappei Yamaguchi and Kenji Nomura. On November 25, 2005, Geneon released a Drama CD for the second season of Peacemaker Kurogane. The songs were sung by Mitsuki Saiga, Joji Nakata, Takaya Toshi, Kappei Yamaguchi, Kenji Nomura, Kousuke Torimi and Takahiro Sakurai.

On March 10, 2004, a soundtrack CD was released for the opening theme of Peacemaker Kurogane, "You Gonna Feel" by Hav.

=== Live-action TV ===
A ten-episode live-action TV series adaptation of the manga aired on TBS entitled Shinsengumi Peace Maker (新撰組PEACE MAKER, Shinsengumi Pīsu Meikā). It premiered on January 15, 2010, and concluded on March 19, 2010.

== Reception ==
Mania.com's Megan Levey commends the tension and emotion of the second volume of Peacemaker Kurogane that "seems to just ring from the pages". Mania.com's Megan Levey commends the third volume of the manga for its "very close facial expressions" in its artwork but criticises the manga's color pages for coming "across as extremely flat and somewhat washed out".

Peacemaker was ranked 9th as the "Favorite Anime Series" in the 26th annual Animage readers' poll. THEM Anime Reviews comments that the "drama of the series is paramount" but its comedy is lame. Animefringe.com criticizes the protagonist of the series, labelling him as "an annoying brat that cries and moans when he doesn't get what he wants". Mania.com's Chris Beveridge commends the anime for its slowly revealed "supernatural elements" as well as the simplicity and comical nature of Saizō the pig. John Sinnott at DVD Talk praises the first DVD of Peacemaker for its original language version over the English dub because Ayumu's English voice actress uses "one of those fake southern accents that are really horrible". DVD Talk's John Sinnott criticizes the fifth DVD of the anime for "the lack of focus this series has". Brian Hanson at Anime Jump criticizes the anime for aping Rurouni Kenshin as well as not displaying the qualities of other Weekly Shōnen Jump anime when it becomes "surprisingly violent". DVD Verdict's Judge Jeff Anderson commends the anime for its "CGI that blends well with the animation" and English dub that has a much more dynamic sound than the original Japanese track. Science Fiction Weekly's Tasha Robinson commends the anime for its "highly textured, detailed and beautifully rendered semi-historical drama, very much in the spirit of Rurouni Kenshin" whenever Tetsu "drops to the background" or "shuts up for a few scenes".
