= John Swasey =

American voice actor

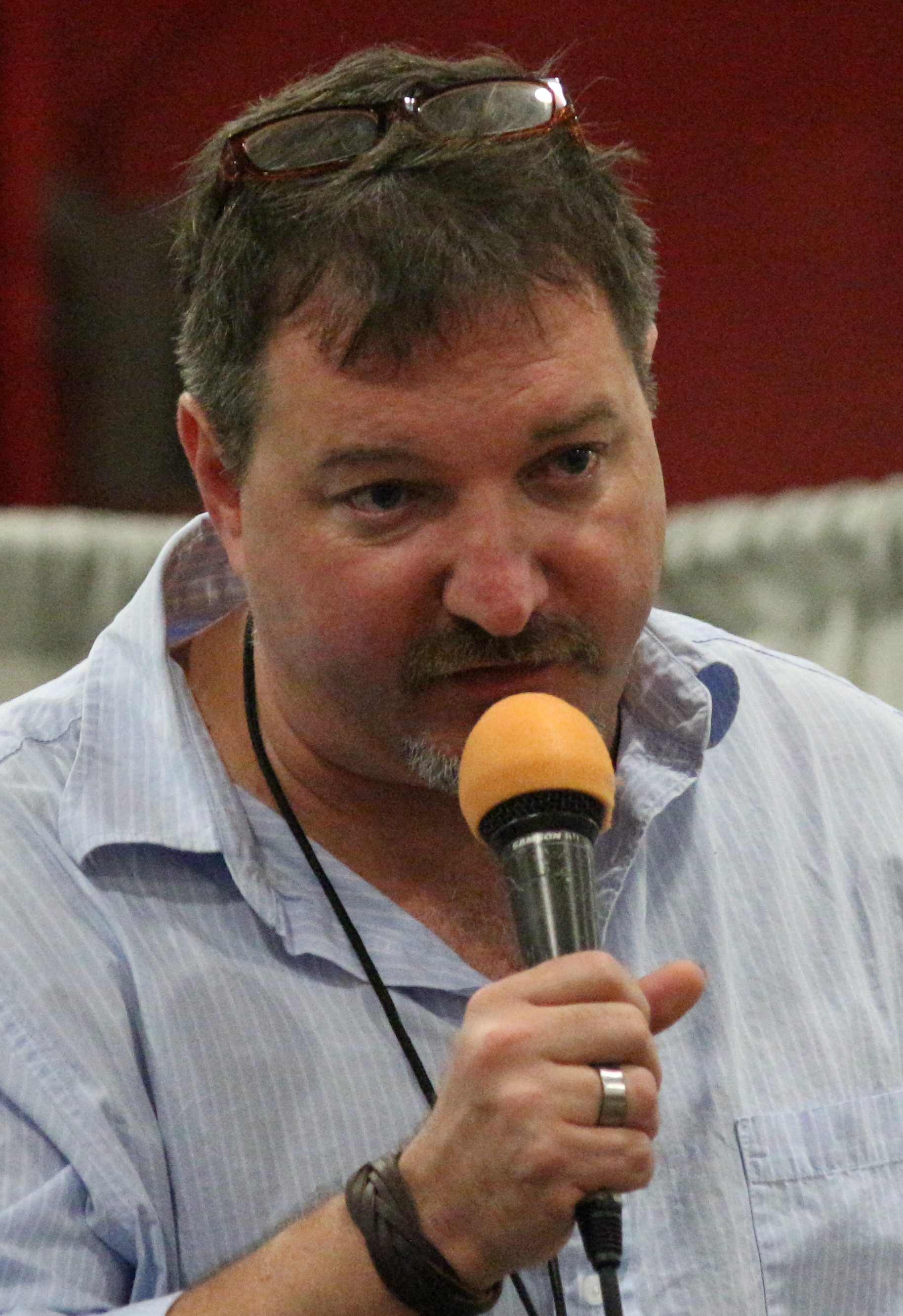
- Swasey at Animate Miami in 2013
- Born: John Allan Swasey
- Occupations: Voice actor; ADR director; script writer
- Years active: 1993–present
- Spouse: Dena Swasey
- Children: 2

John Allan Swasey is an American voice actor, ADR director, and screenwriter.

He has provided voices for English-language versions of Japanese anime series and video games. His most notable roles include Gendo Ikari in the Rebuild of Evangelion films, Sir Crocodile in the Funimation dub of One Piece, Lord Death in Soul Eater, Van Hohenheim in Fullmetal Alchemist: Brotherhood, and All For One in My Hero Academia.

Outside of voice acting, Swasey is also the founder of Anime Dallas, an anime convention which debuted in 2018.

== Filmography ==
=== Voice roles ===
==== Anime ====
1996

- Golden Boy – Director (Ep. 6, Debut Role)

1997

- Sol Bianca – Dr. Delapaz

1998

- Dirty Pair Flash – Andre (Ep. 3), Additional Voices
- New Cutey Honey – Dr. Kisaragi

1999

- Bubblegum Crisis: Tokyo 2040 – Dr. Stingray, Quincy Rosenkroitz
- Martian Successor Nadesico – Seiya Uribatake, Cowboy Johnny (Ep. 9), Einstein (Ep. 18), Gen. Masaka (Ep. 4), Emperor Hyperion (Ep. 14)

2000

- Gensomaden Saiyuki – Zenon
- Dragon Half – Announcer, Narrator
- Gasaraki – Colonel Stilbanov, Kei Nishida, Ronald Feigan, Yoshitake Gowa
- Generator Gawl – Prof. Tekuma Nekasa, Additional Voices

2001

- A.D. Police – Hideaki Kurata, Kaibara
- Princess Nine – Principal Mita
- Sorcerous Stabber Orphen – Volkan
- Spriggan – Mr. Smith

2002

- Chance Pop Session – Yamanaka, Additional Voices
- Sorcerer on the Rocks – Count Cattlefish
- Steel Angel Kurumi – The General

2003

- Angelic Layer – Shouko's Dad, Kaede's Dad
- Aura Battler Dunbine – Bann Burning, Shunka Zama
- Crying Freeman – Tsunaike (ADV Dub)
- Dirty Pair: Project Eden – Prof. Wattsman
- Full Metal Panic! – Chairman Daicustra (Ep. 19), Shintaro Kazama (Ep. 14)
- Magical Shopping Arcade Abenobashi – Arata Imamiya
- Martian Successor Nadesico: The Motion Picture – Prince of Darkness – Seiya Uribatake
- Najica Blitz Tactics – Rasse Pewnt, Admiral
- Neo Ranga – Rano the Elder, Junichi Andou, Kento, Yamazaki
- Noir – Dux (Ep. 3), Priest, Reimann (Ep. 12), Salvatore (Ep. 8)
- RahXephon – Shougo Rikudoh
- Saint Seiya – Phaeton, Hydra, Dios (ADV Dub)
- Super GALS! – Mr. Nakanishi, Detective Kudoh, Watari, Takashi Asai

2004

- All Purpose Cultural Cat Girl Nuku Nuku – Mr. Yamagata
- Aquarian Age: Sign for Evolution – Tachibana
- Azumanga Daioh – Principal, Dr. Ishihara
- Chrono Crusade – Edward "Elder" Hamilton, Carv
- Cyberteam in Akihabara – Hibari's Father
- D.N.Angel – Daiki Niwa
- Fullmetal Alchemist – Karl Haushofer
- Gravion – High Dignitary (Ep.8)
- Grrl Power – Hanazono
- Kaleido Star – Ken Robbins
- Megazone 23: Part 3 – Drakeman
- Mezzo DSA – Tanishi, Takizawa
- Neon Genesis Evangelion – Gendo Ikari (Director's Cut)
- Nurse Witch Komugi – Richard Vincent, Goto, Kaneda
- Peacemaker Kurogane – Isami Kondo
- Puni Puni Poemy – Narrator
- Sister Princess – Jeeves

2005

- Area 88 – Mickey Simon
- Burst Angel – Prof. Keiko Shiratoro
- Divergence Eve – Juhzou Kureha
- E's Otherwise – Kyou
- Elfen Lied – Professor Kakuzawa
- Full Metal Panic? Fumoffu – Teacher, Zenji Ohnuki (Ep. 5)
- Gantz – Muso Tokugawa, Naozumi Saito, Yoshioka, Iwaki
- Godannar – Tatsuya Aoi, Narrator
- Hakugei: Legend of the Moby Dick – Capt. Ahab
- Maburaho – Takashi Yamaguchi
- The Place Promised in Our Early Days – Okabe
- Tree of Palme – Gus, Zakuro

2006

- Diamond Daydreams – Akari's Father, Goto
- Fullmetal Alchemist the Movie: Conqueror of Shamballa – Karl Haushofer
- Guyver: The Bioboosted Armor – Fumio Fukamichi
- Jinki: Extend – Genta Ogawara
- Mythical Detective Loki Ragnarok – Fenrir
- Nanaka 6/17 – Taizo Kirisato
- Nerima Daikon Brothers – Police Chief (Ep. 4)
- Pani Poni Dash! – Michael, Professor (Ep. 9)
- Princess Tutu – Paulo, Montand, Armadylan
- Speed Grapher – Prime Minister Kamiya
- The Super Dimension Fortress Macross – Captain Bruno J. Global
- Tactics – Viscount Edogawa
- Trinity Blood – Archbishop Alphonso D'Este

2007

- 009-1 – James (Ep. 13), Mylene's Father (Ep. 8)
- BECK: Mongolian Chop Squad – Kamejima
- Beet the Vandel Buster – Zenon
- Best Student Council – Ryuheita Iwazakura, Narrator, Yuichi Kimizuka (Ep. 9)
- Blade of the Phantom Master – Fuan-bo
- Case Closed: The Fourteenth Target – Peter Ford
- Coyote Ragtime Show – Mister
- Shin-Chan (Funimation dub) – Yoshiji Koyama
- Full Metal Panic! The Second Raid – Gates
- Glass Fleet – Conrad, Nicholas
- Hell Girl – Ryousuke Sekine (Ep. 21)
- Innocent Venus – Maximas Drake
- Jing: King of Bandits – Seventh Heaven – McQuade, Medaldo
- Kurau: Phantom Memory – Ichise, Makurazaki
- Le Chevalier D'Eon – Teillagory
- Mushishi – Saishu (Ep. 9)
- One Piece (Funimation dub) – Sir Crocodile
- Red Garden – Claude
- School Rumble – Genkai Goto (2nd season)
- Shigurui: Death Frenzy – Kengyou Shizuhata
- Tokyo Majin – Koni Fernandez, Mikuriya, Togo Narutaki
- Tsubasa: Reservoir Chronicle – Mr. Glosum
- Venus Versus Virus – Soichiro Nahashi
- Utawarerumono – Sasante
- Welcome to the NHK – Go Minegishi, Sukekiyo Sagawa
- Xenosaga: The Animation – Andrew Cherenkov
- Kaiji: Ultimate Survivor– Kōji Ishida

2008

- Aquarion – Lopez (Ep. 15)
- Claymore – Isley
- Darker than Black – Huang, Naoyasu Kirihara
- Devil May Cry: The Animated Series – Fredi
- Kanon – Mr. Ishibashi (Ep. 2), Sayuri's Father (Ep. 14)
- Moonlight Mile – Robert
- One Piece Movie: The Desert Princess and the Pirates: Adventures in Alabasta – Sir Crocodile
- Ouran High School Host Club – Chairman Yuzuru Suou
- Project Blue Earth SOS – Secretary General Freeman

2009

- Baccano! – Van Dyke (Ep. 14)
- Big Windup! – Tosei Coach
- Blassreiter – Shido Kasugi
- El Cazador de la Bruja – Enrique (Ep. 8)
- Gunslinger Girl – Il Teatrino – Christiano Savonarola
- Kaze no Stigma – Bernhardt Rhodes
- Kenichi: The Mightiest Disciple – Mototsugu Shirahama
- Murder Princess – King Forland (Ep. 1)
- Rebuild of Evangelion – Gendo Ikari
- Sgt. Frog – Kogoro

2010

- Birdy the Mighty: Decode – Geega
- Blue Drop – Headmaster Fukamachi
- Canaan – Toyama
- Case Closed: The Phantom of Baker Street – Booker Kudo
- Dragon Ball: Curse of the Blood Rubies – Narrator
- Dragon Ball Z Kai – Dodoria, ZTV Announcer, Farmer (Ep. 1)
- Dragonaut: The Resonance – Eiji Kamishina (Jin's Father Ep. 1)
- Fullmetal Alchemist: Brotherhood – Van Hohenheim
- Ghost Hound – Mayor Motoi Yazaki
- Halo Legends – Sergeant Hauser (Homecoming), Captain (Odd One Out)
- Initial D: Fourth Stage – Kozo Hoshino
- Legends of the Dark King – Ryuga, Jirai
- Linebarrels of Iron – Dr. Amagatsu Kizaki
- One Piece (Funimation dub) – Gan Fall
- Rin ~Daughters of Mnemosyne – Tajimamori
- Soul Eater – Lord Death
- Tears to Tiara – Drwc, Tempesta, Ogam

2011

- Black Butler series – Undertaker, Mr. Damiano (Season 1, Ep.1), Laurence Anderson (The Story of Will the Reaper)
- Casshern Sins – Gido (Ep. 11)
- Chaos;Head – Yasuji Ban
- Fairy Tail – Hades/Precht
- The Guin Saga – Casslon, Count Rickard
- My Bride Is a Mermaid – Gozaburo Seto
- Night Raid 1931 – 1st Lt. Mursawa (Ep. 14), Horst Stein (Ep. 5), Jiro Minami (Ep. 7), Miki (Ep. 6), Morito Morishima (Ep. 7)
- Sengoku Basara: Samurai Kings – Oda Nobunaga
- Summer Wars – Mansuke Jinnouchi
- Trigun: Badlands Rumble – Gasback

2012

- The Book of Bantorra – Governor of Paradise
- Dragon Age: Dawn of the Seeker – Byron
- Gintama: The Movie – Tetsuya Murata, Additional Voices
- Intrigue in the Bakumatsu – Irohanihoheto – Jube Nakaiya
- King of Thorn – Ivan Coral Vega
- Majikoi! – Oh! Samurai Girls – Tesshin Kawakami
- Panty & Stocking with Garterbelt – Judgement Day Host (Ep. 8B)

2013

- Aquarion Evol – Commander
- Campione! – Sasha Dejanstahl Voban
- Eureka Seven: AO – Ivica Tanovic
- Guilty Crown – Makoto Waltz Segai
- La storia della Arcana Famiglia – Fukurota
- Little Busters! – Koujiro Kamikita
- Log Horizon – Malves Garitier
- Momo: The Girl God of Death – Kotaro Ichihara (Ep. 3)
- Nakaimo – My Sister is Among Them! – Kumagorou Mikadono
- Phi Brain: Puzzle of God – Genius Okudera
- Rurouni Kenshin: New Kyoto Arc – Hajime Saitō
- Sengoku Basara: The Last Party – Oda Nobunaga
- Tenchi Muyo! War on Geminar – Gaia, King Shurifon
- Toriko – Alfaro

2014

- Attack on Titan – Dhalis Zachary
- Devil Survivor 2: The Animation – Tico (Male), Bifrons, Ceberus
- Ghost in the Shell: Arise – Aramaki
- Jormungand – Leon Rivière
- Majestic Prince – Dai Komine, Diego, Noritada, Poco
- Mardock Scramble: The Third Exhaust – Cleanwill John October
- Psycho-Pass – Jyunmai Itoh (Ep. 14)
- Short Peace – Merle (A Farewell to Weapons), Oni (Gambo)
- Sunday Without God – Yuuto (Ep. 1)
- Tamako Market – Gohei Oji
- Diabolik Lovers – Karlheinz

2015

- Akame ga Kill! – Bols, Nobunaga (Ep. 9, uncredited), Spy (Ep. 4)
- Beyond the Boundary – Grandfather Nase
- Death Parade – Spinner
- Dog & Scissors – Genji, Fumio Honda
- Freezing Vibration – Howard el Bridget (Ep. 7)
- Gangsta. – Chad Adkins
- Girls und Panzer der Film – Renta Tsuji
- No Game, No Life – Ino Hatsuse
- The Rolling Girls – Mamoru Uotora
- Vampire Hunter D – Dr. Ferrino (Sentai dub)

2016

- The Boy and the Beast – Kumatetsu
- Dennō Coil – Ichiro Okonogi
- Lord Marksman and Vanadis – Mashas Rodant
- My Hero Academia – Zen Shigaraki/All For One

2017

- Alice and Zoroku – Zoroku Kashimura
- Amagi Brilliant Park – Ironbeard, King Crimson (Ep. 14)
- Flying Witch – Keiji Kuramoto
- Food Wars!: Shokugeki no Soma – Senzaemon Nakiri
- GATE – Kato El Alestan
- Haikyu!! – Yasufumi Nekomata (Eps. 12-13)
- Is It Wrong to Try to Pick Up Girls in a Dungeon? – Ganesha
- My Hero Academia Season 2 – Zen Shigaraki/All For One
- Knight's & Magic – Lauri Echevarria
- Restaurant to Another World – Tatsugoro
- Ushio & Tora – Hakumen no Mono, Shigure Aotsuki

2018

- Made in Abyss – Habolg
- Nomad of Nowhere – El Rey
- My Hero Academia Season 3 – Zen Shigaraki/All For One
- Attack On Titan Season 3 – Dhalis Zachary
- UQ Holder! - Jack Rakan, Shaba Gyurei (Ep. 8)

2019

- My Youth Romantic Comedy Is Wrong, As I Expected – Kamakura
- Date A Live III - Elliot Baldwin Woodman (Ep. 3)
- My Hero Academia Season 4 – Zen Shigaraki/All For One

2020

- To Love Ru – Principal / Ghi Blee
- Peter Grill and the Philosopher's Time – Guildmaster

2021

- Vinland Saga – Leif
- My Hero Academia Season 5 – Zen Shigaraki/All For One

2022

- Date A Live IV – Elliot Baldwin Woodman
- Reincarnated as a Sword – Garrus
- My Hero Academia Season 6 – Zen Shigaraki/All For One
- RWBY: Ice Queendom - Nicholas Schnee (ep11)

2023

- Vinland Saga Season 2 – Leif
- Urusei Yatsura – Cherry
- Management of a Novice Alchemist - Jasper, Proctor

2024

- The Demon Sword Master of Excalibur Academy – Blackus
- I've Somehow Gotten Stronger When I Improved My Farm-Related Skills – Mirage
- Helck – Hon
- Solo Leveling - Kim Sangshik
- My Hero Academia Season 7 – Zen Shigaraki/All For One
- Date A Live V – Elliot Baldwin Woodman
- Level 1 Demon Lord and One Room Hero – Captain Galmoff/Hayward
- I Parry Everything – Oken

2025

- From Bureaucrat to Villainess: Dad's Been Reincarnated! – Principal
- My Hero Academia: Final Season – Zen Shigaraki/All For One

2026

- Fire Force – Lord Death

=== Films ===
2025

- Batman Ninja vs. Yakuza League – Ra's al Ghul

=== Video games ===
- Borderlands 2 – Salvador, Flanksteak
- Dragon Ball series – Dodoria, Farmer, ZTV Announcer (2010–present)
- Monark – Yugo Jingu
- My Hero One's Justice 2 – All For One
- One Piece: Unlimited Adventure – Sir Crocodile
- Solo Leveling: ARISE ( Kim Sangshik)

=== Live action ===
- Chase – Carl Spackler
- Dazed and Confused – Beer Delivery Guy
- Friday Night Lights – Coach Granger
- Paradise, Texas – Buckeye
- Ray – Customs Agent #1
- Walker, Texas Ranger – Derrick, Kyle Wheeler, Steve Darby
- Where the Heart Is – Jerry
- Barney's Night Before Christmas — Hannah's Dad

=== Production staff ===
==== Voice director ====
- Air Gear
- After the Rain
- BanG Dream! (Season 2)
- The Demon Sword Master of Excalibur Academy
- E's Otherwise
- Innocent Venus
- Iroduku: The World in Colors
- Jinki: Extend
- La storia della Arcana Famiglia
- Majikoi! - Oh! Samurai Girls
- Medaka Box Abnormal
- Nakaimo - My Sister is Among Them!
- Phi Brain: Puzzle of God (Season 2)
- Saint Seiya
- Shadow Skill - Eigi
- Squid Girl (Season 2 & OVAs)
- Ushio & Tora
- Vinland Saga
- Wandaba Style
- Welcome to the N.H.K.

==== Script adaptation ====
- Innocent Venus
- Jinki: Extend
- La storia della Arcana Famiglia
- Nakaimo - My Sister is Among Them!
