= Sayaka Ohara =

Japanese voice actress (born 1975)

- 大原 さやか
- Born: December 6, 1975 (age 50); Kanagawa Prefecture, Japan
- Education: Aoyama Gakuin University
- Occupation: Voice actress
- Years active: 1998–present
- Agent: Haikyō
- Notable work: Umineko When They Cry as Beatrice
- Height: 158 cm (5 ft 2 in)
- Relatives: Takashi Ōhara (brother)
- Website: sayaka-ohara.jp

Sayaka Ohara (大原 さやか, Ōhara Sayaka; born December 6, 1975) is a Japanese voice actress affiliated with Haikyō. Her major roles include Alicia Florence in Aria, Milly Ashford in Code Geass, Erza Scarlet in Fairy Tail, Irisviel in the Fate/Zero and Fate/kaleid liner Prisma Illya series, Layla Hamilton in Kaleido Star, Michiru Kaiou/Sailor Neptune in Sailor Moon Crystal, Beatrice in Umineko no Naku Koro ni, Yūko Ichihara in xxxHolic and Tsubasa Reservoir Chronicle, and the initial voice of Gammisers in episode 27-34 of Kamen Rider Ghost. (Note: This role was passed on to Akihiro Mayama in episode 34 and onwards.) She has also voiced in a variety of video games and live-action overseas dubs, and hosts a number of radio shows, many of which are related to her voice projects. In 2013, she received a Best Supporting Actress award at the 7th Seiyu Awards.

== Filmography ==
=== Anime ===
List of voice performances in anime
Year	Title	Role	Notes	Source
1998–2010	Case Closed	Various characters	Also OVAs and specials	
1999	Space Pirate Mito series	Hiroko		
1999	Devil Lady	OL, Eri Asakawa	Ep. 15, 17	
1999	Cowboy Bebop	Moderator B, Believers B	Ep. 23	
1999	Crest of the Stars	Fegudakupe-Kufosupia	Ep. 7	
1999	Slayers Excellent	Seamstress B	Ep. 3	
1999	You're Under Arrest: The Movie	Natsuyo Tanaka		
1999	Bomberman B-Daman Bakugaiden V	Jennifer	Ep. 27	
1999	Colorful	Aki Yamamoto		
1999	Seraphim Call	Kie	Ep. 7	
1999–2000	Shima Shima Tora no Shimajirō	Dog girl, others	Ep. 343	
1999	The Big O	Girl	Ep. 7	
2000	Hidamari no Ki	Geisha C	Ep. 2	
2000	Weiss kreuz	Schoolgirl C	OVA Ep.2	
2000	Banner of the Stars	Waitress	Ep. 6	
2000	Hand Maid May	Junk shop girl	Ep. 3	
2000	Daa! Daa! Daa!	Guava		
2000–01	Vandread series	Ezra Vieil		
2001–03	Inuyasha	Princess; Wakana	Ep. 17; Ep. 131-132	
2001	Angelic Layer	Yuko Hikawa	Ep. 4	
2001	Star Ocean EX	Nine, Landlady	Eps. 11-13	
2001	Z.O.E. Dolores, I	Operator	Eps. 25-26	
2001–12	Kikaider 01: The Animation	Rieko		
2002	Please Teacher!	Kaede Misumi		
2002–03	Aquarian Age: Sign for Evolution	Higashi Arayashiki, Hikaru Shouji 東海林光, 阿羅耶識東	TV and OVA	
2002	Shrine of the Morning Mist	Shizuka Midou		
2002	Dragon Drive	Meguru, Revolve		
2002	Azumanga Daioh	Mrs. Kimura		
2002	Ichi The Killer: Episode 0	Midori	OVA	
2002–04	Galaxy Angel	Major Mary	Phase 3 and 4	
2003–05	Stratos 4 series	Sayaka Kisaragi	Also X-1, X-2, Advance	
2003	Hanada Shōnen Shi	Hana	Ep. 17	
2003–06	Kaleido Star series	Layla Hamilton	Also New Wings and OAVs	
2003	Scrapped Princess	Raquel Casull		
2003	Dokkoida?!	Kurinohana Kurika		
2003	Please Twins!	Kaede Misumi		
2003	Popotan	Ai		
2003	Yami to Bōshi to Hon no Tabibito	Yōko Sumeragi		
2003	Aquarian Age: The Movie	Hikaru Shouji	OVA	
2004	Maria-sama ga Miteru	Yamamura-sensei	Also Spring	
2004	Daphne in the Brilliant Blue	Rena Honjou		
2004	Diamond Daydreams	Nurse		
2004	Tenbatsu! Angel Rabbie	Margarita	OVA	
2004	The Cosmopolitan Prayers	Priscillaria Shamaran/Sari Rayer		
2004	Hit wo Nerae!	Hikaru Jougasaki		
2004	Love Love?	Hikaru Jougasaki		
2004	Midori Days	Haruka Kasugano, Marin		
2004	Burst Angel	Angelique		
2004–05	Girls Bravo	Maharu Sena Kanaka	Also second season	
2004	Viewtiful Joe	Silver Snow		
2004	Black Jack	Patient	2004 series	
2004–08	Bleach	Masaki Kurosaki		
2004–06	School Rumble series	Tae Anegasaki		
2005	Starship Operators	Isabelle Fellini		
2005	Windy Tales	Movie actress, DJ		
2005	ja:戦闘妖精少女 たすけて! メイヴちゃん	Super Sylph-chan	OVA (一般)	
2005	He Is My Master	Mizuho Sawatari		
2005–07	Emma: A Victorian Romance series	Grace Jones		
2005–06	Tsubasa Reservoir Chronicle series	Yūko Ichihara		
2005–06	Honey and Clover	Rika Harada	Also second season	
2005	Glitter Project	Krone	OVA (一般)	
2005	Munto 2: Beyond the Walls of Time	Ryueri	OVA	
2005	Mirmo!	Sumita's mother	Ep. 3	
2005	Shinshaku Sanada jūyūshi	Akihime		
2005–present	Aria series	Alicia Florence		
2005	Trinity Blood	Noélle Bor		
2005	Atashin'chi	Woman	Ep. 140	
2005	Kirameki Project	Kurone	OVA	
2005	Pani Poni Dash!	Miyuki Igarashi		
2005	Full Metal Panic!: The Second Raid	Wraith, Leys		
2005	Viewtiful Joe	Silver Snow		
2005	SoltyRei	Miranda Maverick		
2005	Noein	Ryouko Uchida		
2006–11	Shakugan no Shana series	Bel Peol		
2006	Rockman Exe Beast	Phakchi Farang	Ep. 16	
2006	Sgt. Frog	Mukuro	Ep. 98	
2006	MÄR	Venus	Ep. 50	
2006	Utawarerumono	Urutori	TV series	
2006–11	xxxHolic series	Yuko Ichihara		
2006–07	Major	Shizuka Saotome	Season 2-3	
2006	The Good Witch of the West: Astraea Testament	Hyla		
2006	Project Blue Earth SOS	Emery		
2006	Crayon Shin-chan	Housewife A, Imohara Natsumi		
2006	Tonagura!	Hatsune Arisaka		
2006	Chocotto Sister	Ayano Sonozaki		
2006	Mobile Suit Gundam SEED C.E. 73: Stargazer	Selene McGriff		
2006–08	Code Geass series	Milly Ashford, Lelouch (young), Zhou Chanrin, Ichijiku Hinata	Also R2	
2006	Hell Girl: Two Mirrors	Chinami Hagisawa	Ep. 4	
2006	Baldr Force Exe Resolution	Reika Tachibana	OVA	
2006	Bartender	Sayo Yamagichi	Ep. 4	
2006	Freedom Project	Kara Uewa, Koe Nagareru	OVA	
2006	Fist of the Blue Sky	Yáng Měi-Yù		
2006	Buso Renkin	Mayumi Hayasaka	Ep. 11	
2007	Ape Escape Saru! Get You: ~On Air 2~	Myoe	Ep. 14	
2007	GR: Giant Robo	Lt. Isabella Raid		
2007	Jūsō Kikō Dancouga Nova	Seimi		
2007	Sakura Wars: New York	Ankhesenamen	OVA	
2007	Romeo x Juliet	Hermione		
2007	Kaze no Stigma	Kirika Tachibana		
2007	Skull Man	Yui Onizuka		
2007	Bokurano	Miko Nakarai	Ep. 100	
2007	Darker Than Black	Mîna Kandaswami		
2007	Princess Resurrection	Micasa	Ep. 23	
2007	Sketchbook ~Full Color's~	Ao Kajiwara, Gray, Yuko Yayoi		
2007	Fantastic Detective Labyrinth	Miyako Tomaru		
2007	Moyashimon	Haruka Hasegawa		
2007	Higurashi no Naku Koro ni Kai	Rika's Mother	Also Rei	
2007	Blue Dragon	Tonto's Sister	Ep. 32	
2007	Bamboo Blade	Mumu house Manager		
2007	Bludgeoning Angel Dokuro-Chan 2	Babel		
2007	Prism Ark	Echo		
2007–08	Shugo Chara! series	Mrs. Fujisaki		
2007	Doll animation Licca-chan	Izumi-chan		
2008	Mnemosyne	Laura		
2008	Blassreiter	Beatrice Grese		
2008	Zettai Karen Children	Minamoto's mom	Ep. 3	
2008	Kirarin Revolution	Sumima-sensei	Ep. 110	
2008	Telepathy Girl Ran	Kanno Reika		
2008–10	Sekirei	Miya Asama	Also Pure Engagement	
2008	Scarecrowman: The Animation	Catherine		
2008–09	Birdy the Mighty: Decode	Reika Kanno, Kaori Sanada, Natal (young)	Also second season	
2008	Hidamari Sketch×365	Naoi-san		
2008	Toradora!	Yasuko Takasu		
2008	Linebarrels of Iron	Yui Ogawa		
2008	ja:ライブオン CARDLIVER 翔	Princess primary / Shimadzu Crow		
2008	Earl and Fairy	Armin		
2008–10	Nodame Cantabile	Son Rui	Also Paris and Final	
2008	Hakushaku to Yōsei	Ermine		
2009	Kurokami The Animation	Sano Akane		
2009	Asura Cryin'	Clichy	Also second season	
2009	Basquash!	Haruka Gracia		
2009	Valkyria Chronicles	Selvaria Bles		
2009	The Guin Saga	Queen Tania, Emma		
2009	Queen's Blade series	Melpha		
2009	Dogs: Bullets & Carnage	Kiri		
2009	Utawarerumono	Urutori	OVA	
2009	Umineko no Naku Koro ni	Beatrice		
2009	Gokujō!! Mecha Mote Iinchō	Kao Chisana		
2009	Doraemon	Little Mermaid	Ep. 153	
2009	Battle Spirits: Shounen Gekiha Dan	Nami		
2009	Hanasakeru Seishōnen	Isabella	Ep. 22	
2009	A Certain Scientific Railgun	Therestina Kihara Lifeline		
2009	Gokyudai Monogatari	Shizuka		
2009–19	Fairy Tail	Erza Scarlet	Also specials, 2nd series	
2009	Tamagotchi!	Lady Papatchi		
2009	Kūchū Buranko	Sayoko	Ep. 2	
2009	Tatakau Shisho	Renas/Olivia		
2009	Hipira: The Little Vampire	Soul		
2009	Anpanman	Nitto-san	Christmas special	
2010	Chu-Bra!!	Tamaki Mizuno		
2010–11	The Qwaser of Stigmata series	Urada Oikawa		
2010	Quiz Magic Academy ~ Original animation 2	Yang Yang	OVA	
2010	Tatami Galaxy	Keiko		
2010	Yumeiro Patissiere	Woman director	Ep. 46	
2010	MM!	Tomoko Sado		
2010	Otome Yōkai Zakuro	Tsukuhane, Zakuro's mother		
2010	To Love-Ru	Ringo Yuki		
2010–13	Tamayura series	Sayomi Hanawa	OVA and TV series	
2011	Rio: Rainbow Gate!	Cartia Goltschmidt		
2011	Freezing	Milena Marius	Ep. 9	
2011	Oniichan no Koto Nanka Zenzen Suki Janain Dakara ne!!	Nanaka Takanashi		
2011	Wandering Son	Satomi Nitori		
2011	Level E	Mermaid	Ep. 10	
2011	Air Gear: Break on the Sky	Ine Makigami	OVA Ep. 2-3	
2011	Tiger & Bunny	Mari		
2011	Sekai-ichi Hatsukoi	Ichinose		
2011	Ano Hana	Touko Yadomi		
2011	Gintama	Narasaki Sachi	Ep. 205	
2011	Aria the Scarlet Ammo	Kanae Kanzaki	Ep. 4	
2011	Towa no Quon			
2011	Blade	Carroll		
2011	Usagi Drop	Yukari Nitani		
2011	Battle Spirits: Heroes	Nana, Moshirita		
2011	[[C^{3}]]	Peavey Borowoi		
2011–12	Fate/Zero	Irisviel von Einzbern	Also second season	
2011	Persona 4: The Animation	Margaret		
2011	Ben-To	Matsubagiku		
2012	The Knight in the Area	Ayaka Mine		
2012–13	Listen to Me, Girls. I Am Your Father!	Yuri Takanashi	TV and OVA	
2012	Pretty Rhythm: Aurora Dream	Karina Togashi		
2012	Hiiro no Kakera series	Vier		
2012	Upotte!!	Ms. Thompson		
2012	Jourmungand	Sophia "Valmet" Velmer	Also Perfect Order	
2012	Moe Can Change!	Maya Oshiro	OVA based on the mobile game	
2012	Eureka Seven AO	Truth (beauty)		
2012	Total Eclipse	Stella Bremer		
2012	Tari Tari	Sakai Mahiru		
2012	Chōyaku Hyakunin isshu: Uta Koi	Princess Shikishi		
2012	Moyasimon Returns	Haruka Hasegawa		
2012	Magical Girl Lyrical NANOHA The MOVIE 2nd A's	Reti Crown		
2012	Natsuyuki Rendezvous	Rokka Shimao		
2012	Magi: The Labyrinth of Magic	Paimon	Ep. 5	
2013	Maoyu	Assassin		
2013	Zettai Karen Children: Unlimited Psychic Squad	Momiji Kanou		
2013	Majestic Prince	Reika Saionji		
2013	Gargantia on the Verdurous Planet	Ridget	Also OVAs	
2013	A Certain Scientific Railgun S	Therestina Kihara Lifeline		
2013	Kingdom	Shika / Zi Xia	2nd TV series	
2013	Fantasista Doll	Madeleine		
2013	Kin-iro Mosaic	Alice's mother		
2013–15	Fate/kaleid liner Prisma Illya series	Irisviel von Einzbern		
2013	Futari wa Milky Holmes	Madame Visconte		
2013	Nagi-Asu: A Lull in the Sea	Manaka's mother まなかの母		
2014	Nobunaga the Fool	Hannibal Barca		
2014	Saki	Kasumi Iwato	season 3 The Nationals	
2014	Witch Craft Works	Kazane Kagari		
2014–15	Nisekoi	Nanako Onodera		
2014	Zetsumetsu Kigu Shōjo Amazing Twins	Kakeru Sennokura		
2014	Blade & Soul	Elle Karen		
2014	La Corda d'Oro: Blue Sky	Ryoko Mikage		
2014–15	Knights of Sidonia	Captain Kobayashi	Also Dai-kyū Wakusei Sen'eki	
2014	Argevollen	Suzushiro Saori		
2014	Sengoku Basara: End of Judgement	Saika Magoichi		
2014–15	Aldnoah.Zero	Yuki Kaiduka		
2014	Space Dandy	Rose Reginald	Ep. 25	
2014	Love Stage	Nagisa Sena		
2014	Persona 4: The Golden Animation	Margaret		
2014	Laughing Under the Clouds	Kiiko Sasaki		
2014	Log Horizon 2nd Season	Indicus		
2015	The Rolling Girls	Haruka Misono		
2015	Fate/stay night: Unlimited Blade Works	Homonculus	Season 2	
2015	Gunslinger Stratos	Olga Janetine		
2015	Hello!! Kin-iro Mosaic	Alice's mother		
2015	Ore Monogatari	Sunagawa's mom		
2015	Etotama	Chuu Tan		
2015	Go! Princess PreCure	Stella Amanogawa		
2015	Gangsta.	Beretta		
2015	Chaos Dragon: Sekiryū Sen'eki	Kōkaku		
2015	Shimoneta: A Boring World Where the Concept of Dirty Jokes Doesn't Exist	Sophia Nishikinomiya		
2015	God Eater	Sakuya Tachibana		
2015	Prison School	Mari Kurihara		
2016	Pretty Guardian Sailor Moon Crystal Season III	Michiru Kaioh/Sailor Neptune	Death Busters arc	
2016	Terra Formars: Revenge	Xi Chun Li		
2016	JoJo's Bizarre Adventure: Diamond Is Unbreakable	Aya Tsuji		
2016	Food Wars! Shokugeki no Soma: The Second Plate	Leonora Nakiri		
2017	Sagrada Reset	Witch		
2017	ID-0	Karla Milla-Foden		
2017	Re:Creators	Meteora Osterreich (delusion)	Ep. 13	
2017	Knight's & Magic	Celestina Echevarria		
2017	Made in Abyss	Ozen	Eps. 5 - 9	
2017	The Ancient Magus' Bride	Titania		
2018–19	Hug! Pretty Cure	Papple		
2018–present	Golden Kamuy	Kano Ienaga		
2019	Wise Man's Grandchild	Miria		
2019	Isekai Cheat Magician	Lemia		
2019–22	The Demon Girl Next Door	Seiko Yoshida	Also second season	
2019	How Heavy Are the Dumbbells You Lift?	Yakusha Kure		
2019	The Ones Within	Isabella		
2019	Kiratto Pri☆Chan	Tetsunee		
2020	Arte	Veronica		
2020	Wave, Listen to Me!	Madoka Chishiro		
2020	Listeners	Ein Neubauten		
2020	Fruits Basket	Ayame and Yuki's Mother		
2020	Sleepy Princess in the Demon Castle	Neo Alraune		
2021	Edens Zero	Elsie Crimson		
2022	Tokyo 24th Ward	Kanae Suidō		
2022	Requiem of the Rose King	Queen Margaret		
2022	Deaimon	Fuki Irino		
2022	Utawarerumono: Mask of Truth	Ulthury		
2023	The Fire Hunter	Yanagi		
2023	My Home Hero	Kasen Tosu		
2023	The Legendary Hero Is Dead!	Esel Borgnine		
2023	Campfire Cooking in Another World with My Absurd Skill	Marie		
2024	Rising Impact	Aria Sayfort		
2024	The Unwanted Undead Adventurer	Luka		
2025	Bogus Skill "Fruitmaster"	Saint		
2025	Farmagia	L'Oreille		
2025	Zenshu	Admiral		
2025	You and Idol Pretty Cure	Pikarine		
2025	The Too-Perfect Saint: Tossed Aside by My Fiancé and Sold to Another Kingdom	Cornelia Adenauer		
2025	Betrothed to My Sister's Ex	Ryu-Ryu		
2026	Journal with Witch	Minori		
2026	Hell Mode	Theresia		
2026	Hell's Paradise: Jigokuraku	Isuzu		

=== Films ===
List of voice performances in feature film
Year	Title	Role	Notes	Source
1999	You're Under Arrest: The Movie	Tanaka Natsuyo		
2000	Case Closed: Captured in Her Eyes	Sara Shiratori		
2005	The Princess in the Birdcage Kingdom / xxxHolic: A Midsummer Night's Dream	Yuko Ichihara	Double feature	
2006	The Laws of Eternity ja:永遠の法	Yuko Natsuse		
2007	Evangelion: 1.0 You Are (Not) Alone	Operator, others		
2007	Bleach: The DiamondDust Rebellion	Masaki Kurosaki		
2010	King of Thorn	Katherine Turner		
2011	Buddha: The Great Departure	Pajapati		
2012	Magical Girl Lyrical Nanoha The Movie 2nd A's	Reti-Ouran		
2012	Fairy Tail the Movie: Phoenix Priestess	Erza Scarlet		
2012	Evangelion: 3.0 You Can (Not) Redo	Sumire Nagara		
2013	Lupin the 3rd vs. Detective Conan: The Movie	Front lady		
2016	Your Name	Futaba Miyamizu		
2017	Fairy Tail: Dragon Cry	Erza Scarlet		
2017–18	Code Geass Lelouch of the Rebellion	Milly Ashford, young Lelouch Lamperouge	3-Part Compilation Film, New dialogues recorded	
2019	Code Geass Lelouch of the Re;surrection	Milly Ashford		
2020	A Whisker Away	Miki Saitō		
2021	Pretty Guardian Sailor Moon Eternal The Movie	Michiru Kaioh/Super Sailor Neptune	2-Part Film, Season 4 of Sailor Moon Crystal (Dead Moon arc)	
2021	Sing a Bit of Harmony	Mitsuko		
2023	Pretty Guardian Sailor Moon Cosmos The Movie	Michiru Kaioh/Eternal Sailor Neptune	2-Part Film, Season 5 of Sailor Moon Crystal (Shadow Galactica arc)	

=== Video games ===
Year	Title	Role	Notes	Source
2001	SkyGunner	Femme		
2001	Final Fantasy X	Lucil	PS2	
2002–04	Galaxy Angel series	Dr. Kela		
2002	Simple 2000 series: Vol. 45: The Love and Tears and Reminiscence and... ~Thread Colors: Facing Goodbye~ ja:Thread Colors〜さよならの向こう側〜	Kuyo full leaf	PS1/PS2	
2003	Final Fantasy X-2	Lucil	PS2	
2003	彼女の伝説、僕の石版 ～アミリオンの剣とともに～	Neruda	PS1/PS2	
2004	F Fanatic	Lisa Lil		
2004	Tales of Rebirth	Hilda Rhambling		
2005	Armored Core: Formula Front	AC voice		
2005	School Rumble series	Tae Anegasaki		
2005	Ape Escape 3	Akie		
2005	Armored Core: Last Raven	Alliance headquarters	PS1/PS2	
2005–15	Quiz Magic Academy series	Yang Yang		
2006	Enchanted Arms	Sayaka		
2006	Suikoden V	Arshtat, Hazuki, Leknaat, and Sharmista	PS1/PS2	
2006–07	.hack//G.U. series	Kaede	3 vols	
2006–08	Aria series	Alicia Florence		
2006	Gundam Battle Royale	Miyu Takizawa		
2006–09	Utawarerumono	Urutorī	PS2, also Portable in 2009	
2006	Summon Night 4	Rorret	PS1/PS2	
2007	Luminous Arc	Claire	DS	
2007	Mobile Suit Gundam: 0083 Card Builder	Miyu Takizawa		
2007	Odin Sphere	Grizelda		
2007	Sumomomo Momomo - The Strongest Bride on Earth	Rurika Miduki	PS1/PS2	
2007	Super Robot Wars Original Generations	Troye Soldier	PS2	
2007	Super Robot Wars Original Generation Gaiden	Troye Soldier 1	PS2	
2007	Mobile Suit Gundam: MS Sensen 0079	Hoa Blanchett		
2007	xxxHolic: Watanuki no Izayoi Sowa	Yūko Ichihara	PS1/PS2	
2007	Kin'iro no Corda2 Encore	Mari Tsuzuki	PS1/PS2	
2007	Gundam Battle Chronicle	Hoa Blanchett		
2007	Castlevania: The Dracula X Chronicles	Annette		
2007	SD Gundam G Generation Spirits	Miyu Takizawa		
2008	Coded Soul: Uketsugareshi Idea	May		
2008	Armored Core for Answer	Operator, Intelligent OI Union client		
2008	Code Geass: Lost Colors	Milly Ashford		
2008	Arcana Heart 2	Clarice Di Lanza	Also Suggoi! update	
2008	Valkyria Chronicles	Selvaria Bles	PS3	
2008	Super Robot Taisen OG Saga: Endless Frontier	Otone, Anne Sirena	DS	
2008	Bleach: The 3rd Phantom	Konoka Suzunami, Shiyo		
2008	Persona 4	Margaret, Noriko Kashiwagi	PS1/PS2	
2008	Gundam Battle Universe PSP	Corporal Hoa Blanchett, Miyu Takizawa		
2008	Code Geass R2: Banjo no giasu gekijo	Milly Ashford		
2008	Fate/tiger colosseum Upper	Irisviel von Einzbern		
2008	Wrestle Angels Survivor 2	Sakuya Yoshihibiki / Hoshina Yuki	PS1/PS2	
2008	Suikoden Tierkreis	Xenoa, Neira	DS	
2008	White Knight Chronicles	Florraine	PS3	
2009	Castlevania Judgment	Carmilla		
2009	Dengeki Gakuen RPG: Cross of Venus	Yasuko Takasu	DS	
2009	Toradora Portable!	Takasu Yasuko	PSP	
2009	Aion: The Tower of Eternity			
2009	Sekirei ~Gifts from the Future~	Miya Asama	PS1/PS2	
2009	Phantasy Star Portable 2	Mika	PSP	
2009	Queen's Blade: Spiral Chaos	Melpha	PSP	
2010	Valkyria Chronicles II	Selvaria Bles	PSP	
2010	ja:電撃のピロト〜天空の絆〜	DJ Muse	PSP	
2010	.hack//Link	Kaede	PSP	
2010	God Eater	Sakuya Tachibana	PSP	
2010	Zangeki no Reginleiv	Frigg	Wii	
2010	Kin'iro no Corda 3	Ryoko Mikage	PSP	
2010	Super Robot Taisen OG Saga: Endless Frontier Exceed	Anne Sirena, Hilda Bran		
2010	Fairy Tail Portable Guild	Erza	PSP	
2010–11	Sengoku Basara: Samurai Heroes	Saika Magoichi	Also Party in 2011	
2010	Lord of Arcana	Battle Voice	PSP	
2010	God Eater Burst	Tachibana Sakuya	PSP	
2010	Umineko no Naku Koro ni: Majo to Suiri no Rondo	Beatrice, others		
2010	Ougon Musou Kyoku	Beatrice		
2011	Arcana Heart 3	Clarice Di Lanza	Also Love Max in 2014	
2011	Valkyria Chronicles 3	Selvaria Bles		
2011	Phantasy Star Portable 2 Infinity	Micah	PSP	
2011	MicroVolts	Kotone Kamino		
2011	Queen's Gate: Spiral Chaos	Melpha	PSP	
2011	Nano Diver	Silver Cross	PSP	
2011	Umineko no Naku Koro ni Chiru: Shinjitsu to Gensō no Nocturne	Beatrice, others		
2011	Everybody's Golf 6	Nadia		
2011	SD Gundam G Generation 3D	Selene McGriff	3DS	
2011	Chaos Rings	Eluca		
2012	Super Robot Wars OG Saga: Masokishin II	Wendy Rasumu Ikunato	PSP	
2012	Genso Suikoden: Tsumugareshi Hyakunen no Toki	Sunil, Iris	PSP	
2012	Persona 4 Golden	Margaret	PS Vita	
2012–13	Root Double: Before Crime * After Days	Miyako Tenkawa	Also Xtend edition	
2012	Gunslinger Stratos	Olga Jentein	Arcade	
2012	Aquapazza: Aquaplus Dream Match	Urutorī	PS3	
2012	Project X Zone	Selvaria Bles	3DS	
2013	Silent Hill: Book of Memories			
2013	Muv-Luv Alternative Total Eclipse	Stella Bremer		
2013	Etrian Odyssey Untold: The Millennium Girl	Sakuya	3DS	
2013	Final Fantasy XIV: A Realm Reborn	Livia Sas Junius		
2013	Fantasista Doll	Madeline	App	
2013	Metal Max 4	Olivia		
2013	Call of Duty: Ghosts	Dr. Cross	PS4; Japanese Dub	
2014–15	Sengoku Basara 4	Saika Magoichi	Also Sumeragi	
2014	Gunslinger Stratos 2	Olga Gentein	Arcade	
2014	Infamous Second Son	Fetch	Japanese Dub	
2014	Blade & Soul	Eru Karen	PS4	
2014	Persona Q: Shadow of the Labyrinth	Margaret		
2014	The Legend of Heroes: Trails to Azure Evolution	Cecil Neues		
2014	Granblue Fantasy	Magisa	iOS/Android	
2014	Persona 4 Arena Ultimax	Margaret		
2014	Kin'iro no Corda 3: Another Sky feat. Tennon Gakuen	Ryoko Mikage		
2014	Marginal 4: Idol of Supernova	Mai Kadena		
2015	Fire Emblem Fates	Mikoto		
2015	Prince of Stride	Diane Hasekura		
2015	Saki: The Nationals	Kasumi Iwato		
2016	Fate/Grand Order	Irisviel von Einzbern (Dress of Heaven)		
2016	Overwatch	Mercy	Japanese Dub	
2017	Fire Emblem Heroes	Mikoto		
2017	Shin Megami Tensei: Strange Journey Redux	Mem Aleph		
2017	Azur Lane	IJN Mikasa	Android, iOS	
2018	The King of Fighters All Star	Chizuru Kagura	Android, iOS	
2018	Persona Q2: New Cinema Labyrinth	Margaret	3DS	
2019	Homestar VR Special Edition	Narrator	PS4	
2019	Punishing:Gray Raven	Qu	Android, iOS	
2020	Arknights	Tsukinogi, Penance	Android, iOS	
2020	Guardian Tales	Noble Succubus Bianca	Android, iOS	
2020	The Alchemist Code	Celis Crowley	Android, iOS, PC	
2020	Genshin Impact	Ningguang	Android, iOS, PC, PS4, Switch	
2021	Onmyoji	Yomei Higanbana	Android, iOS, PC	
2021	Blue Archive	Rin Nanagami	Android, iOS	
2021	Alchemy Stars	Chloe Gabriel	Android, iOS, PC	
2021	Shin Megami Tensei V	Cleopatra	Nintendo Switch	
2022	Cookie Run: Kingdom	Frost Queen Cookie	Android, iOS	
2022	Goddess of Victory: Nikke	Harran	Android, iOS, PC	
2022	The King of Fighters XV	Chizuru Kagura		
2022	Return to Shironagasu Island	Ada Higgins	PC, Switch	
2022	Path to Nowhere	Bai Yi	Android, iOS	
2022	Tower of Fantasy	Lyra	Android, iOS, PC, PS4, PS5	
2023	RED:Pride of Eden	Terror		
2023	Echocalypse	Guinevere, Lindell	Android, iOS, PC	
2026	Zenless Zone Zero	Sunbringer	Android, iOS, PC, PS5, Xbox X/S	

=== Tokusatsu ===
List of voice performances in tokusatsu
Year	Title	Role	Notes	Source
2016	Kamen Rider Ghost	Gamma Ultima Fire (ep. 23), Gammaizers (Fire, Time, Gravity, Liquid, Wind, Climate, Planet, Blade, Magnetic, Arrow, Spear, Hammer, Electric Rifle, Oscillation) (Note: human form Akihiro Mayama) (ep. 27-34, 47-48), Takeru Tenkūji's mother (ep 32)	Gammiser role is replaced by Akihiro Mayama starting in episode 34-47. Co-voiced with Yui Fujimaki	
2023	Ultraman Decker	Mother Spheresaurus	Voice (ep 25)	

=== Dubbing ===
Title	Role	Notes	Source
24	Dana Walsh		
Air America	Woman	Ep. 6	
Beetlejuice Beetlejuice	Jane Butterfield Jr	Voice dub for Amy Nuttall	
Boy Meets World	Laurie		
CSI: Miami	Gabriella	Season 2, voice dub for Bridgette Wilson	
Devil	Bridget, Jack		
Evolution	Girl		
The Fighter	Charlene Fleming	Voice dub for Amy Adams	
Freaks & Geeks	Sarah		
Gothika	Rachel		
I Saw the Devil	Officer Ju		
The Kennedys	Jacqueline Kennedy		
Melrose Place	Audrey		
Next Stop Wonderland	Bailey		
The Object of My Affection	Suni	Voice dub for Samia Shoaib	
Random Hearts	Jessica Chandler		
Ridge Middle School	Eric Winans	Voice dub for Liliana Mumy (2003-2005) Charlotte Nicdao (last episodes from 2005)	
Rocko's Modern Life	Elkie		
Scary Movie	Drew Decker	Voice dub for Carmen Electra	
Soldier of Fortune	Various characters		
The Sopranos	Meadow Soprano	Voice dub for Jamie Lynn Sigler	
Supernatural	Rachel	Season 6	
The Stepford Wives	Sarah	Voice dub for Faith Hill	
This Is My Father	Maria		
Turn Left, Turn Right	Woman		
The Way Home	Hye Young	Voice dub for Lim Eun Kyung	

=== Audio dramas ===
Title	Role	Notes	Source
B Gata H Kei	Kazuki Kosuda	Drama CD	
Karakurizōshi Ayatsuri Sakon	Megumi Sahara	Drama CD	
Ace Attorney 123: Naruhodo Selection	Chihiro Ayasato	Drama CD	
Drama CD Tona-Gura!	Hatsune Arisaka	Drama CD	

=== Railway announcements ===
- Keikyu Railway (All stations on the Keikyu Line)
- Keio Corporation (All stations on the Keiō Line)
- Tobu Railway (The following stations: Nagareyama-otakanomori, Higashi-Iwatsuki, Kita-omiya, Higashi-mukojima, Umejima, Soka, Matsubara-danchi, Kita-kasukabe, Himemiya, Sugito-takanodai, Satte, Shin-kanuma, Hanyu, Sano, Asaka, Kawagoe, Kawagoeshi, Kasumigaseki, Tsurugashima, Wakaba, Sakado, Takasaka)
- Sotetsu (The following stations: Nishi-yokohama, Hoshikiwa, Minami-makigahara)
