= List of Kaleido Star characters =

This article lists the characters associated with the anime Kaleido Star.

== Characters ==
=== Sora Naegino ===
Sora Naegino (苗木野 そら, Naegino Sora)
Voiced by: Ryō Hirohashi (Japanese); Cynthia Martinez (English)
Sora is the main protagonist of Kaleido Star. Her parents took her to Kaleido Stage as a child. Although they died shortly thereafter, and Sora was adopted by her father's cousin and his wife, Sora is inspired by this childhood memory to become a member of the Stage when she reaches adulthood. With her adoptive parent's hesitant approval she travels to the United States to audition. After Sora's luggage is stolen, she stops the thief but is late to the audition. After being depressed due to her failed performance, the owner Kalos, having seen her chase earlier, convinces her to perform in the actual show. Most of the cast, including Layla Hamilton, are dissatisfied with Sora due to the special circumstances through which she joins; Her manager Ken has feelings for her and accepted her from the start, while the other cast members accept Sora due to her persistence and hard work along with her magnetic personality, as well as performing a stunt called "The Golden Phoenix". Though Sora is a fairly talented performer, there are often huge gaps in her ability, especially on the trapeze. This is because she was never taught before joining the Stage and so the first maneuver she learns is Layla's Golden Phoenix, an exceptionally difficult move, so she mostly knows only extremely challenging maneuvers and very little of the basics.
In the beginning of the series Sora is the only one who can see the magical stage spirit Fool. This character reveals she has been chosen by the stage. In the first season, Fool reveals only she can perform the Legendary Great Maneuver with Layla. In the second, he reveals that she has the potential to become a "true star".
In the second season, Leon does not approve of Sora, and May tries to prove that she is better than Sora, and should have been the one to perform the legendary maneuver with Layla. At first, Sora aimed for being Leon's partner, but then, while doing the Angel's act with Yuri, she realizes that what she really wanted was to turn Kaleido Stage into a joyful and happy stage just like the one she saw when she first saw Cinderella at the Stage, along with no conflict, and stick to that dream, which she told Layla, while still wanting to be a true star.

=== Layla Hamilton ===
Layla Hamilton (レイラ・ハミルトン, Reira Hamiruton)
Voiced by: Sayaka Ohara (Japanese); Sandra Krasa (English)
Layla is an accomplished and seasoned, but arrogant, performer of Kaleido Stage. At first rivals with Sora, Layla becomes friends with her after they become partners for Freedom, a performance that is about people who overcome their differences to be free.
Layla has a strained relationship with her father, Kevin Hamilton, a wealthy hotel chain owner who attempts to force her daughter to become an actress and is frequently trying to push her into doing so. However, Layla decides to rejoin the circus due to her fondness for the Kaleido Stage, as her mother has gone there during her youth.
When Layla starts to see Fool, she becomes Sora's partner for the maneuver. While training in the Grand Canyon, both Layla and Sora start to gain each others trust and become good friends. However, Layla's arm is injured, and after performing the great Mystical Act she is unable to perform on Kaleido Stage. In the second season, she becomes a Broadway actress and her new partner is producer Cathy Taymor. She visits Sora many times and they still share that special bond.

=== Mia Guillem ===
Mia Guillem (ミア・ギエム, Mia Giemu)
Voiced by: Chinami Nishimura (Japanese); Nancy Novotny (English)
Mia was born in the Netherlands and is a close friend of Sora's. In the second episode, Mia accepts Sora's presence on the stage after Sora attempts to perform the Golden Phoenix. Later in the series, Mia becomes passionate about writing the scripts for Kaleido Star's performances; she has a keen interest in introducing literature into Kaleido Star's acts. She occasionally has inner conflicts between performing and tending to her sick grandmother, who is Mia's biggest fan.

=== Anna Heart ===
Anna Heart (アンナ・ハート, Anna Hāto)
Voiced by: Akeno Watanabe (Japanese); Kira Vincent-Davis (English)
Anna is also a good friend of Sora's. She, like Mia, comes to accept Sora after the second episode. Anna is talented in many areas and frequently plays more serious parts. Anna truly wishes to perform comedy and usually tries to get Mia to write comedy into her parts. The request is almost always denied. Anna takes her love of comedy from her estranged father Jack, a stand-up comedian; when they meet each other after several years, though, Anna is perturbed by his bitterness, but with a push from Sora and Mia they part amiably. In season two she gets paired up with two girls that find her extremely funny and help her with her comedy acts for the shows. Anna is determined to make Ken her partner but he always hates the idea of performing comedy.

=== Yuri Killian ===
Yuri Killian (ユーリ・キリアン, Yūri Kirian)
Voiced by: Susumu Chiba (Japanese); Illich Guardiola (English)
Yuri, like Layla, is an experienced performer, yet he's deeply traumatized by a terrible tragedy. His father, Arlon Brass, died attempting the Mystical Act, and he never forgave Kalos for letting his father die. Yuri plays a pivotal role in the second half of the first season when he betrays the stage, first by stealing away a good portion of the cast and later by buying out the stage and taking control of it. He later agrees to return it to Kalos if Layla and Sora accomplish the same Mystical Act that caused his father's death; when they manage to do so, he fulfills his promise. In the second season, Yuri helps Sora get into the Circus Festival in Paris. He appears to be a bitter rival of Leon's, and feels that he is responsible for the death of Leon's sister, Sophie who was a lot like Sora in many ways.

=== Fool ===
Fool, Spirit of The Stage (フール, Fūru)
Voiced by: Takehito Koyasu (Japanese); Jay Hickman (English)
Fool is the mysterious spirit of the stage. He is about the size of an action figure, and appears as a type of jester or clown. He appears to Sora shortly before she appears on the Kaleido Stage for the first time. Fool is invisible to everyone but those who are destined to do great things on the stage and/or whose heart is completely dedicated to the stage. He seems to be the spirit of a true jester who once was devoted to a princess who never smiled.
Although a ghost, Fool is a pervert who tries many times throughout the series to see Sora, and sometimes her friends, naked (usually by suggesting that they should take a shower). Sora is quick to prevent Fool from peeking in any given situation by trapping him somewhere or rebuking him forcefully, most often in a comedic, slapstick fashion. Later in the first season, Layla becomes capable of seeing Fool as well; the same happens to Rosetta at the end of the second season, who takes his advice more seriously than Sora, most of the time where Sora can tell he is only doing so to satisfy his perversion.
In his more useful moments, he acts as a fortune teller, revealing possible futures to Sora. In the first season, he reads the future by drawing a single tarot card. In the second season, he reveals the hidden workings of inter-character relationships, associating each character with a sign of the zodiac and stating how some signs are dimmer or brighter. He is also the one who explains the inner mechanics of the Legendary Great Maneuver to Layla and Sora in episode 25, An Amazing Bond.

=== Sarah Dupont ===
Sarah Dupont (サラ・デュポン, Sara Dyupon)
Voiced by: Aya Hisakawa (Japanese); Luci Christian (English)
Sarah is the main singer of Kaleido Stage from the United Kingdom, as well as the building manager for the dorms where everyone lives. Many want Sarah to sign on a record label because she is so gifted in singing, but she stays true to Kaleido Stage. She is an avid fan of martial arts, and frequently proposes bizarre alternative methods to help Sora achieve her objectives, such as working out with Master Lin during the production of The Little Mermaid.
Sarah is well acquainted with Kalos and has been with the Stage from the beginning, when she and Kalos were performing on the streets with another friend. This friend, Andy, returns once to try to persuade Sarah to leave Kaleido Stage with offering her a singing career, but she refuses.

=== Ken Robbins ===
Ken Robbins (ケン・ロビンス, Ken Robinsu)
Voiced by: Hiro Shimono (Japanese); John Swasey (English)
Ken is the stage manager for Kaleido. He used to want to perform onstage when he was young, but claims to have a weak heart and decided that it was best to be backstage. Ken also greatly admires Sora, in many respects, and has a huge crush on her, but never has the guts to confess his feelings for her, though everyone else is aware of his feelings for her, in one instance even trying to help him confess to her. In one episode, he does manage to confess to Sora, but Mr. Policeman misinterprets his confession and causes Sora to believe he means it as a fan. This does not stop Ken from doing everything he can to help Sora out; frequently he acts as her personal trainer, warning her of the dangers she might encounter, and he acts as the voice of reason for the group on several occasions. Anna is determined to make Ken her partner in comedy, which he is equally determined not to do.

=== Kalos Eido ===
Kalos Eido (カロス・永戸, Karosu Eido)
Voiced by: Keiji Fujiwara (Japanese); Rick Burford (English)
Kalos is the head manager and boss of the entire Kaleido Stage and gives Sora many helpful pieces of advice throughout the anime. He also maintains high expectations of everyone he encounters. Before Kaleido Stage, Kalos was a stage magician and acrobat and used to perform on the street with Sarah and Andy; their past relationship is rather vague. Kalos founded Kaleido Stage with the money he got from the insurance company after he injured his fingers during an audition for a spot in Las Vegas. As a professional, he has strict standards when it comes to how things are run at the Kaleido Stage and how his performers should conduct themselves. While he's firm in his decisions, occasionally he'll give in and let people spread their wings as they please. Kalos is also the one who trained Yuri's father, Arlon Brass, for the Mystical Act, but sadly this failed and Arlon died, traumatising Yuri and embittering him. He is the only person who can tell Layla and Sora how to train for the act.

=== Mr. Policeman ===
Mr. Policeman (Jerry) (ポリス, Porisu; Police)
Voiced by: Unshou Ishizuka (Japanese); James Reed Faulkner (English)
Jerry is self-described throughout the show as Sora's "#1 fan". He's a tall, muscled African-American policeman who has helped and supported her from episode one. He is also secretly in love with Kate, a doctor who occasionally appears to help cast members through physical injuries. In the second season, Jerry gathers up his courage and proposes to Kate.

=== Marion Benigni ===
Marion Benigni (マリオン・ベニーニ, Marion Benīni)
Voiced by: Fumiko Orikasa (Japanese); Kim-Ly Nguyen (English)
Marion is a young girl living near the stage. Her father is a designer and engineer and works on the sets, but her mother Cynthia (a former trampolinist) is dead due to an accident. Like many of the others, Marion does not accept Sora at first (and specially when Sora attempts to use trampolines in her acts), but is quickly won over to her side. In the second season Marion begins to perform with the group on the Children's Stage.

=== Jonathan ===
Jonathan (ジョナサン, Jonasan)
Voiced by: Etsuko Kozakura (Japanese); Tiffany Grant (English)
Jonathan is a baby seal that Sora picked up one day. Unable to keep pets, Sora tries to hide him. However, the secret is revealed and instead of kicking him out, Marion's father Jake builds a tank for him. He is capable of doing many tricks and sometimes seems more coordinated than Sora, creating comical performances that the attending children love. During the second season, Jonathan becomes closer to Marion and refuses to perform with anyone else.

=== Rosetta Passel ===
Rosetta Passel (ロゼッタ・パッセル, Rozetta Passeru)
Voiced by: Kaori Mizuhashi (Japanese); Serena Varghese (English)
Rosetta is a Belgian-born, French-raised world champion diabolo performer. After her first performance at Kaleido Stage, Kalos kicks her off the stage because her act was unsatisfying: he explains that despite being perfect in the technical field, she lacked passion at what she was doing, so everyone was bored by her act. Feeling this wasn't fair, Sora takes the girl under her wing, teaching her how to put audience enjoyment before technical perfection. In return, Rosetta teaches Sora diabolo, which Sora returns to when she needs help learning new acts. Towards the end of the first season, Rosetta returns to join Sora after Kaleido Stage is taken over by Yuri. She joins Sora's troupe and witnesses Sora and Layla performing the Legendary Great Maneuver together. Rosetta returns in the second season wishing to become a trapeze artist, following in Sora's steps. In episode 51 she becomes able to see Fool.

=== May Wong ===
May Wong (メイ・ウォン, Mei Won)
Voiced by: Mai Nakahara (Japanese); Hilary Haag (English)
First appearing in the second season, May is a Chinese-American ex-figure skater and new recruit who challenges Sora's position. She became jealous of Sora because not only did she perform the legendary maneuver with Layla, but that Layla calls Sora "her dreams" and has faith that Sora will succeed her as a true performer and also Leon's unusual interest in her. Sora and May have a tense rivalry for most of the second season, which aids both in becoming better performers. May turns out to be exceptionally talented and becomes Leon's partner for the Dracula show. However, during one of the performances, Leon drops her off and causes her to dislocate her shoulder; this allows Sora to obtain the spot for the Circus festival they were practicing for. May, realizing that it takes more than hard work and self-confidence to be a good star, refuses to give up her spot just like that and overtakes Sora with a new one armed trick, finally besting Sora and putting her on top. As she does so, May lays off her arrogance and becomes a better person, even accepting Sora's friendship since she now understands why Layla chose her as a successor.

=== Leon Oswald ===
Leon Oswald (レオン・オズワルド, Reon Ozuwarudo)
Voiced by: Takahiro Sakurai (Japanese); Mike MacRae (English)
Leon is a very famous trapeze performer who arrives in the second season. He comes off as arrogant, refusing to perform with Sora, because she is not skilled enough for him. His true desire, however, lies in a promise he made to his dying sister Sophie: to see the Angel's Act, an unrivaled and beautiful trapeze act they had developed, completed. He is a rival of Yuri Killian, whom he blames for the death of Sophie in an accident. Sora in some ways is like Sophie which is why Leon became interested in her, close to the end of season 2 Leon finally accepts Sora as his partner.

=== Mr. Kenneth ===
Mr. Kenneth (ケネス, Kenesu)
Voiced by: Mitsuo Senda (Japanese); Jason Douglas (English)
Mr. Kenneth is an elderly man and representative for the Stage's stockholders. He is often portrayed as a producer, seemingly giving him executive powers often rivaling or superseding that of Kalos. He has great experience in show business and often aids Sora. He knows Ken's personality, but always calls him "boy".

=== Simon Park ===
Simon Park (サイモン・パーク, Simon Park)
Voiced by: Tomohiro Nishimura (Japanese); TJP (English)
Simon Park is highly sought as an Entertainment Industry Writer, Director and Producer. An associate of Layla's family, Simon is a likable, charming and brilliant-minded 'English Accented' Playful-Pervert who often has a wise crack to warm even the most tense of moods.
Hired during the first Season of Kaleido Star as Mia Guillem's Mentor and Script Supervisor, Simon is highly responsible for Mia Guillem's grand success for her first written script and stage play "Freedom". Although criticism and the script's countless revisions nearly break Mia at one point, Simon's confidence in Mia as his apprentice leads him to passionately answer calls in the middle of the night as Mia works hard day and night on "Freedom"—a stage play which could either make or break Kaleido Stage as Yūri Kirian begins his buyout. Much thanks to Simon's guidance, "Freedom" sells out for its first two weeks. Unfortunately, Yūri cancels all following shows after he begins his blind vengeance and buys out Kaleido Star. Simon also appears in the final episode of Season One to witness Sora and Layla's performance of "The Legendary Great Maneuver" and is first to stand and clap during that performance.

=== Cathy Taymor ===
Cathy Taymor (キャシー・ティモア, Cathy Taymor)
Voiced by: Kotono Mitsuishi (Japanese); Shannon Emerick (English)
Cathy Taymor is introduced in episode 34 during Season Two as the Writer and Director of "Salome In Vegas", an off-Broadway stage-play starring Layla Hamilton. She is also presented as Layla's "new career partner" who gave her the desire to perform once again after she exits Kaleido Stage due to her injury. Although she initially introduces herself kindly during Sora's second one week leisure from Kaleido Stage, her real character is that of a fast-talking-fast-paced-brash-and-outspoken 30-something fireball of energy. Cathy's relationship with Layla as her "new partner" emotionally distresses Sora at first. Later in the series, much like with Simon Park in Season One, Kalos once again outsources an experienced director to mentor Kaleido Stage's budding writer and director Mia Guillem: this experienced director is Cathy.
During production of "Romeo And Juliet", Mia falls in love with Cathy's direct and take-no-prisoner's-style and begins to look up to Cathy as her mentor. Later, during production of "Swan Lake", Cathy and Mia become close and trusting friends and together come up with amazing ideas for Kaleido Star's version of the play. Although her introduction is somewhat subtle, Cathy is an important character who inspires and motivates nearly every person in Kaleido Stage either directly or indirectly.
