= Mnemosyne (TV series) =

Japanese anime television series

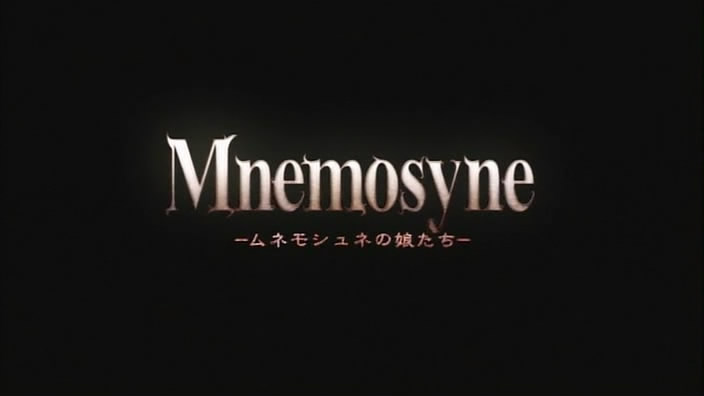

ムネモシュネの娘たち (Munemoshune no Musumetachi)
- Genre: Action, science fiction, supernatural
- Created by: Xebec, Genco
- Light novel
- Written by: Hiroshi Ōnogi
- Illustrated by: Chūō Higashiguchi
- Published by: Hobby Japan
- Magazine: Charano!
- Original run: January 2008 – September 2008
- Volumes: 1
- Anime television series
- Directed by: Shigeru Ueda
- Produced by: Nobuhiro Osawa; Yasuo Ueda; Yoshikazu Beniya
- Written by: Hiroshi Ōnogi
- Music by: Takayuki Negishi
- Studio: Xebec
- Licensed by: AUS: Siren Visual; NA: Funimation; UK: Manga Entertainment
- Original network: AT-X
- Original run: February 3, 2008 – July 6, 2008
- Episodes: 6
- Manga
- Written by: Miss Black
- Published by: Kill Time Communication
- Magazine: Comic Valkyrie
- Original run: May 27, 2008 – July 26, 2008
- Volumes: 1

Mnemosyne (ムネモシュネの娘たち, Munemoshune no Musumetachi), also known as RIN: Daughters of Mnemosyne, is a six-episode Japanese anime television series produced by Xebec and Genco. The anime was produced to commemorate the tenth anniversary of the AT-X network, which it originally aired on. Funimation licensed the series in North America. The plot, rich in the mix of murder and action, is set in modern and near-future Tokyo, and revolves around Rin Asougi, an immortal private investigator. A light novel and a manga adaptation have also been published.

== Plot ==
A mysterious tree known as Yggdrasil would often appear in the world of the humans, releasing many small orbs into the human world. A small proportion of the orbs are special ones known as "Time Fruits". If a Time Fruit enters a female, she becomes Immortal. If a Time Fruit enters a male, he becomes a crazed winged being known as an "Angel". Rin Asougi is an immortal who runs a private investigation agency in Tokyo's Shinjuku district alongside her assistant, Mimi who is also immortal. Rin often converses with a mysterious unknown individual on the phone. She is often being hunted down by an assassin named Laura who was hired by Apos, an angel who persecutes immortals and is the current guardian of the Yggdrasil.

The story begins in the year 1990. During a search for a missing cat, Rin instead finds Koki Maeno, a young man with distorted memories. As she investigates his past, she discovers that he is a clone created by Sayara Yamanobe, a woman searching for immortality. After discovering this, Koki decides to work for Rin in her agency. In 2011, Koki marries a former client, Yuki. Sayara Yamanobe returns, kidnaps Rin and attempts to attack Japan with biological weapons. Koki, after becoming an Angel, sacrifices himself to save Rin and Japan. In 2025, Rin ends up investigating a case involving Koki's son, Teruki, after he meets his long-term cyber girlfriend in reality. Rin manages to save Teruki; however, she ends up sacrificing herself.

In the year 2055, Rin has lost her memory and goes by the name Tamaki Saito. She had fallen in love with a mortal man named Ihika. However, she regains her memories when Laura discovers she's alive and attempts to kill her. After Apos kidnaps Rin, Mimi and Teruki's daughter Mishio travel to Apos' castle to save her. Rin is locked in a room with an angel and kills him, later discovering him to be Ihika. It is revealed that the unknown man on the phone was Tajimamori, Rin's savior from a thousand years earlier, a former guardian of the Yggdrasil, and Apos' father. After impregnating Rin, he is killed by Apos, who is himself locked away in the roots of the Yggdrasil. Later, Rin gives birth to a baby boy, who will one day become the tree's new guardian.

== Characters ==
=== Main characters ===
Main characters of Mnemosyne: Mimi (left) and Rin (right)

Rin Asougi (麻生祇 燐, Asōgi Rin)
Voiced by: Mamiko Noto (Japanese); Colleen Clinkenbeard (English)
The protagonist of the series. Her appearance is that of someone in her mid-twenties but her real age is unknown, but she has stated to be born some time in the 11th century. In episode six, she says she has been looking for Tajimamori for a thousand years, making her at least a millennium old. She usually wears a black suit and glasses. Her whimsical personality serves as a front for a cunning, ruthless mind and extraordinary martial art skills. She always keeps a number of throwing blades and a garrote wire concealed on her body. At some point in the past, a "Fruit of Time" (also known as a "time fruit") entered Rin's body, effectively making her immortal, unable to age, and capable of surviving and regenerating from a phenomenal amount of bodily damage. In episode four, she is sucked inside a running jet engine and regenerates her entire body over 25 years, albeit at the cost of all her memories (they return when she is briefly killed by Laura). In episode five, Apos removes Rin's time fruit, seemingly killing her just like Sayara and Maeno before, but it is revealed in episode six that her death is not certain as long as her time fruit remains intact. Rin's time fruit is then brought to Apos' castle, where its proximity to Yggdrasil, the fabled source of all time fruits, speeds up her revival, which would have normally taken many decades. She and Mimi run the detective business Asogi Consulting together in West Shinjuku until their office is demolished in episode four.
Mimi (ミミ)
Voiced by: Rie Kugimiya (Japanese); Jamie Marchi (English)
Rin's assistant, who is also an immortal. Mimi has a bright personality and is fond of alcoholic drinks despite having the appearance of someone in her teens. Her job scope includes financial management, information processing, and other miscellaneous tasks. She cares for Rin very much and would do anything to ensure her safety, even while nagging her to do the job properly. She feels indebted to Rin as Rin saved her from being devoured by an angel during their first encounter and has been protecting her ever since. She is a formidable hacker but is outmatched by Katsuyuki Kamiyama in episode four. After Rin disappears in episode four, she leaves with Genta and becomes a Buddhist nun. In episode six, believing there still being a chance that Rin is still alive, Mimi constantly displays her resolve in rescuing Rin from Apos' sadistic scheme.

=== Maeno family ===
Kouki Maeno (前埜 光輝, Maeno Kōki)
Voiced by: Nobuyuki Hiyama (Japanese); Robert McCollum (English)
A young man with distorted memory whom Rin accidentally saves in episode one. He is, in fact, a clone created by Aoyama Pharmaceutical company. The original Koki Maeno died during an experiment that involved his vivisection. His memory lacks realism, as it is actually the memory of the original Koki written into the clone's brain by artificial means. After discovering the truth, he chooses to keep on living and starts working at Asougi Consulting, where he spends the next twenty-one years. Some time between episodes two and three, he marries Yuki Shimazaki and has a son named Teruki with her.
In episode three, he is shot by Sayara while rescuing Rin, and has to consume Shogo Shimazaki's time fruit in order to survive as an angel. After saving Rin and having one last tender moment with her, he returns to consume Sayara, but is killed (unlike that of immortals, the death of an angel is permanent regardless the time fruit) by Apos before he can finish. Koki's time fruit is lost in the sea but is inexplicably found by Rin while she regenerates in the ocean between episodes four and five. His granddaughter Mishio acquires it after Rin's body is destroyed in episode five, unwittingly brings it to Apos' castle in episode six, and passes it to Rin as the latter is consumed by Yggdrasil. Koki's spirit then helps Rin to break free.
Yuki Maeno (前埜 有紀, Maeno Yuki) née Shimazaki (島崎, Shimazaki)
Voiced by: Yoshino Takamori (Japanese); Cherami Leigh (English)
Koki's wife, whom he meets in episode two. During Koki's involvement in the case of her brother Shogo, the two grow fond of each other and marry some time between episodes two and three. In episode three, they have a son named Teruki. After Koki's death, Yuki continued to raise Teruki alone.
Shougo Shimazaki (島崎 省吾, Shimazaki Shōgo)
Voiced by: Hideo Ishikawa (Japanese); Ian Sinclair (English)
Yuki's older brother, who becomes an angel prior to episode two. Although most angels succumb to their primal desires quickly, Shogo's exceptional willpower allows him to retain consciousness for a very long time, which he uses to exact revenge upon people who previously maltreated him. After he finally loses his consciousness and attacks Rin, she has to kill him by impaling him with a tree branch. Apos expresses desire to obtain Shogo's time fruit but Rin instead gives it to Maeno, who eventually uses it to become an angel himself, saving Rin from Sayara. After Maeno is killed by Apos, his time fruit falls into the ocean and is lost until episode five.
Teruki Maeno (前埜 輝紀, Maeno Teruki)
Voiced by: Emiri Katō (Child), Daisuke Hirakawa (Adult) (Japanese); Brina Palencia (Young), Patrick W. Reid (Adult) (English)
Koki and Yuki's only son, who first appears as a child in episode three and becomes the male lead in episode four. Some time between episodes three and four, Rin saves his life in a car accident, and he states that he has felt watched over and protected by her ever since. Their formal introduction takes place in episode four, when Tamotsu brings him to Asougi Consulting due to his involvement in the Ruon case. He appears again in episode five, now the CEO of Maeno Holding Group company, with a teenage daughter named Mishio.
Mishio Maeno (前埜 美汐, Maeno Mishio)
Voiced by: Kaori Nazuka (Japanese); Luci Christian (English)
Teruki Maeno's only daughter and Koki's granddaughter, first appearing as a teenager in episode five. Finding Teruki's old video of Rin, she starts investigating her, frequently comparing herself to Sherlock Holmes. Upon the first meeting, they quickly grow fond of each other, and Mishio sticks with Rin and Mimi for the rest of the series. In episode six, Rin explains that Mishio is the youngest of Tajimamori's descendants.

=== Antagonists ===
Apos (エイポス, Eiposu)
Voiced by: Akira Ishida (Japanese); Todd Haberkorn (English)
The primary antagonist of the series. As revealed in episode five, Apos possesses great qualities which according to him makes himself a master. He seems to have no concept of human morals but instead, has a sadistic sense of amusement and beauty. In the early episodes, Apos demonstrates interest in Rin, to the point that he hires mortal killers to target her. In episode three, he reveals that he is after Rin's time fruit. Apparently, time fruits contain the immortals' memories and Apos enjoys consuming them. It is also revealed that he has the ability to instantly remove the fruits from both immortals and angels (thus killing them). Anyone else wishing to kill someone with a time fruit must physically dig through their victim for the time fruit. In episode six, Apos is revealed to be the child of Tajimamori, the previous Guardian of Yggdrasil, and the current Guardian himself. Guardians are supposed to switch every once in a (long) while, but Apos desires to become a permanent guardian by sacrificing Rin to Yggdrasil.
Laura (ローラ, Rōra)
Voiced by: Sayaka Ohara (Japanese); Clarine Harp (English)
An assassin skilled with firearms and other weapons who is repeatedly sent to assassinate Rin by Apos. Although Rin kills Laura in most of the engagements, Apos resurrects her so that she can attack Rin again. In episode four, she becomes a cyborg, though the extent of her transformation is left open. Episode five reveals that Laura is in possession of an android body designed to resemble Rin and telepathically linked to Apos' torture victim, and she further elaborates in episode six that only her brain remains intact, apparently as the result of Apos' sadistic manipulations. Rin extracts the Fruit of Time from there and feeds it into Apos at Laura's own request so that he would feel her memory and pain.
Sayara Yamanobe (山之辺 沙耶羅, Yamanobe Sayara)
Voiced by: Rie Tanaka (Japanese); Monica Rial (English)
The head of the Aoyama Pharmaceutical research lab in Sayama. Originally researching bacteria, she discovered one that could be the key to cloning, moving on to conduct illegal cloning experiments aiming to achieve immortality. She has a sadistic personality, often torturing her captives to death. In episode one, Sayara is last seen being surrounded by the delirious zombies she created. In episode three, she is revealed to have been saved by Apos in the last moment, who injects her with a time fruit after her body is already considerably mutilated. As a result, she remains crippled and waits twenty-one years until a powered exoskeleton capable of supporting her is invented. After one last confrontation with Rin and Maeno, she is finally killed by Apos, who removes and consumes her time fruit.
Ruon Kamiyama (神山 瑠音, Kamiyama Ruon)
Voiced by: Hitomi Nabatame (Japanese); Tia Ballard (English)
The antagonist in episode four. The daughter of the "modern von Neumann" Katsuyuki Kamiyama, Ruon's consciousness was removed from her body by Katsuyuki and uploaded onto the net (2.0) as an artificial intelligence, effectively killing her. Katsuyuki implies that this event was the cause of Great Network Crisis of 2020. Ruon spends five years posing as an online sex doll until she becomes infatuated with Teruki because he is the first person to want to meet her offline. Following the events of the episode, her physical (android) form is destroyed through an airplane jet engine.

=== Others ===
Tamotsu Yanagisawa (柳沢 保, Yanagisawa Tamotsu)
Voiced by: Yasunori Matsumoto (Japanese); Christopher Bevins (English)
A police investigator and a close acquaintance of Rin, first introduced in episode one. He enjoys Rin's company and provides her with useful information. He is killed by a military sniper following AI Ruon's orders in episode four. Immediately before his death, he reminisces about what may have been an intimate moment with Rin. He is affectionately referred to as "Tamo" by Rin, and despite his constant (bad) attempts to keep their meetings low-key during the first two episodes, he does not object to being called by that name.
Genta (源太)
Rin and Mimi's female dog who lives at their office. As an immortal, she does not age throughout the series and survives being shot on multiple occasions without any visible lasting injuries. Mimi takes her with her after the Asougi Consulting office is demolished in episode four. Genta is killed in episode five, leaving only ashes behind, just like human immortals whose time fruits are removed.
Informants
Voiced by: Rumi Kasahara (Japanese); Wendy Powell (English) (first)
Voiced by: Emi Nakashima (Japanese); Terri Doty (English) (second)
Voiced by: Kiyoko Nagaki (Japanese) (third)
A group or organization of women who provide Rin and Mimi with crucial information in regards to their investigations throughout the series and whose names have never been revealed. The first informant is introduced in episode two and is mentioned to have died prior to episode four. The second informant is introduced as an assistant of the first one in episode three and inherits her position in the next episode. In return for their services, both demand sex with either Rin or Mimi. Mimi is extremely uncomfortable and unnerved by this at first but seems to have entered into some sort of relationship with the second informant by episode four. In episode six, the second informant is apparently dead as well, replaced by a third one, with whom Mimi keeps a strictly professional relationship. In episode 3 during their search for information on Rin, Koki Maeno was forced to watch the informants have sex with Mimi or else no information would be given. All three informants showed a fondness for grasshoppers.
Ihika (いひか)
Voiced by: Rikiya Koyama (Japanese); J. Michael Tatum (English)
Rin's mortal lover after she loses her memories in episode five. He proposes to her twice in the episode but is killed by Laura soon after Rin accepts his second proposal. In episode six, Ihika is revived by Apos in his castle as an angel and chained next to Rin to torment her. Rin, seeing him in a berserk frenzy and about to break free, is then forced to kill him in self-defense, realizing his identity only as he turns into ashes. His time fruit is lost when Laura throws it out of the window.
Tajimamori (多遲摩毛理)
Voiced by: Masahiko Tanaka (Japanese); John Swasey (English)
Finally identified in episode six, Tajimamori is the previous Guardian of Yggdrasil and the father of Apos. According to a legend told in episode five, he was once tasked by an emperor to find a Fruit of Time for him but when he discovered it, the emperor already died. The legend is based upon Shinto myths. As a Guardian of Yggdrasil, he doesn't age but isn't invulnerable like the immortals. He can grow angelic wings like Apos and his presence has the same effect on Mimi as an angel's, but he doesn't exhibit the primal savageness of regular angels. He is seen talking to Rin on the phone throughout the series, often in an intimate or fatherly manner. In episode six, it is revealed that he and Rin fell in love with each other over a thousand years ago, but he chose to distance himself from her. He is also revealed to be the progenitor of the Maeno line which tied all his descendants' fate to Rin's. Shortly before his death at Apos' hands in episode six, Tajimamori fathers a child with Rin.

== Media ==
=== Print media ===
A light novel adaptation titled Mnemosyne no Musumetachi 2008 (ムネモシュネの娘たち2008) was serialized in Hobby Japan's light novel magazine Charano! between the January and September 2008 issues. The light novel is written by the writer of the anime, Hiroshi Ōnogi, and illustrated by Chūō Higashiguchi. A single volume containing five chapters was released on April 1, 2009.

A manga adaptation illustrated by Miss Black serialized two chapters in Kill Time Communication's oriented manga magazine Comic Valkyrie volume 12 on May 27, 2008 and volume 13 on July 26, 2008, respectively.

=== Anime ===
Mnemosyne is a six-episode television series of 45-minute episodes directed by Shigeru Ueda and written by Hiroshi Ōnogi. The animation was handled by Xebec, but planning and production was shared with Genco, that also had a part in the original concept creation. Original character design is by Chūō Higashiguchi, and was used as a template by the character designer for the anime version, Mitsuru Ishihara. Music direction was headed by Takayuki Negishi. The series' opening theme is "Alsatia" and the ending theme is "Cause Disarray"; both songs were written by Yama-B, composed by Syu, and performed by Galneryus. Funimation licensed Mnemosyne in February 2009 for a North American release under the title RIN ~Daughters of Mnemosyne~.

The series was produced by the Yggdrasil Executive Committee which included Xebec and Genco. The plot of the episodes is set in Tokyo and revolves around Rin Asōgi, an immortal private investigator, as she explores the secrets of modern and near-future world and the supernatural events that surround the fictional society of immortals like herself. There are large time gaps in the internal chronology between the first five episodes, ranging from one to thirty years.

The six episodes were broadcast monthly on AT-X channel in Japan, between February 3 and July 6, 2008. Each episode is 45 minutes long. Two pieces of theme music are used for the episodes: the opening theme "Alsatia" and the ending theme "Cause Disarray". Both were composed and performed by the Japanese metal band Galneryus. The series was produced to commemorate the tenth anniversary of the AT-X network it originally aired on.

No.	Title	Chronology	Original release date	Ref.
1	"Cats Don't Laugh"; Transliteration: "Neko wa Warawanai" (Japanese: 猫は笑わない)	1990	February 3, 2008	N/A
The episode opens with Rin being chased to the rooftop by a female assassin named Laura. Severely wounded, Rin falls down to her apparent death. In the next scene, she wakes up unscathed in her apartment and returns to work, looking for a stray cat she was hired to find. Circumstances lead her to run into a man named Koki Maeno in a quiet street. After knocking out several agents pursuing Koki, Rin takes him to her office where he tells her and her partner Mimi that although he is not amnesiac, he feels that his memories don't quite fit and he would like to know why he is being pursued. Through Rin's links, they find out that Koki is connected to the Aoyama Pharmaceutical company. With Mimi's help, they infiltrate its labs but are captured. Rin is tortured to death by the sadistic chief researcher Sayara Yamanobe, while Koki is revealed to be a runaway cloning test subject. Miraculously, Rin survives, completely healed of her injuries, and confronts Yamanobe, leaving her in the hands of other delirious test subjects. As the compromised facility is demolished by Aoyama Pharmaceutical, Rin escapes with Koki and hands him a gun, for him to decide what he wants to do with his life. After he seemingly commits suicide, Rin leaves the scene. The next day he appears in her office, wounded on the head and with the missing cat in his hands, and asks to become her business partner.
2	"Angels Don't Cry"; Transliteration: "Tenshi wa Nakanai" (Japanese: 天使は啼かない)	1991	March 2, 2008	N/A
One year after the Aoyama Pharmaceutical incident, Rin is hired to track down a rare postage stamp and visits an old homeless man she calls "Professor" to gather information on it. He is revealed to possess one himself but it is stolen soon afterwards and he is severely injured. As Rin looks through his belongings, she is attacked by Laura who quickly detonates a suicide bomb. Meanwhile, Koki meets a girl named Yuki Shimazaki who is looking for an "angel" that may know the whereabouts of her missing brother Shōgo. Attracted by the explosion, he finds Rin's mutilated body and is visibly shaken by witnessing her regenerate. Later, Mimi explains to him that both Rin and herself are immortal because of the "time fruit" inside their bodies. She claims to not even remember how long the two of them have been immortal. In the meantime, several people including Rin's client are murdered and before long, she confirms that Yuki's brother turned into an "angel" due to contact with time fruit and committed the recent murders as acts of revenge. She also reveals that angels are natural enemies of immortal women like herself: in their presence, immortals are overcome with lust and angels use that time to devour them. Rin then deduces who Shōgo's final victim would be and confronts him only to seemingly give in to sexual desire. As the angel starts feasting on her, she manages to kill him. An apparition of Apos, the chief villain of the series, emerges nearby to claim Shōgo's time fruit but Rin gives it to Koki instead and he, in turn, to Yuki. In the final scene, Rin returns the stolen stamp to "Professor" who laments how his life was wasted on it.
3	"Flowers Don't Shed Tears"; Transliteration: "Hana wa Namida o Nagasanai" (Japanese: 花は涙を流さない)	2011	April 6, 2008	
Twenty years later, Koki is still working for Rin, is now married to Yuki, and has a son with her. The episode opens with them receiving a call from a girl wanting to meet Rin. However, she only says one cryptic sentence and dies in front of her, which reminds Rin of a story she heard from a friend back in 1945. She soon discovers that the girl displayed the same symptoms as subjects of a biological weapon "Higan", once tested on the so-called "Death Island". The Island has been officially demolished and Tamotsu Yanagihara, a police officer and Rin's friend, confirms that its former residents were among the victims of each recent bombing in Tokyo. Soon after that, Rin is captured and brought to Death Island. Mimi decides to visit Rin's informant (whose name is never mentioned in the series) who demands sex with her in return for information on Rin's whereabouts. She informs them that the group behind the bombings and Rin's capture is called "Kudoru" (Japanese: Evil). Meanwhile on the Island, Rin discovers that Sayara Yamanobe survived as an immortal but has to rely on a powered exoskeleton to move. Surviving a vivisection, Rin escapes but is chased and killed again. Sayara explains her plan to exterminate humans with Higan, leaving only immortals on Earth. She claims that without humans, the Earth will no longer suffer from overpopulation and environmental pollution, leaving it a paradise for immortals. Koki arrives on a helicopter to free Rin but is fatally shot by Sayara. With his last strength, he consumes Shōgo's time fruit and turns into an angel. He carries Rin away from the ship to safety, thanking her for his life and kissing her goodbye. He then returns to devour Sayara but Apos arrives to remove both their time fruits, killing them instantly. The next day, Rin and Mimi are in their office, both mourning Koki's death. Koki's son, Teruki, asks his mother when his father will return home. She tearfully responds that he will be home soon and for him to be a good boy in the meantime.
4	"Ghosts Don't Scream"; Transliteration: "Yūrei wa Sakebanai" (Japanese: 幽霊は叫ばない)	2025	May 4, 2008	
The episode opens with Koki's son Teruki having sex with a girl named Ruon via a virtual reality network called "2.0". He offers to meet her in real life ("1.0") but she refuses. Later, he meets Ruon in 1.0 only to witness her murder. Teruki finds Tamotsu, who brings him to Asougi Consulting. Mimi explains that Ruon is actually an AI created by Katsuyuki Kamiyama, a modern von Neumann. Rin takes Teruki for a walk but they are attacked by Laura, now a cyborg, who mutilates Rin considerably. Teruki is shaken by the sight of Rin regenerating and suffers a brief nervous breakdown after she reveals the truth about time fruits and immortals to him. Mimi and Tamotsu discover that Ruon was created during "Project L'Isle-Adam", based on Kamiyama's daughter whom he killed. Ruon calls to invite Teruki to 2.0 but they are attacked by Kamiyama and Mimi severs the connection. Immediately thereafter, commandos attack the office forcing them to flee. En route, Mimi explains that Ruon might have been an attempt to create "The Future Eve". The military attacks again and Teruki is taken away. Back in the office, Rin and Mimi realize that the girl Teruki met in 1.0 was an android with Ruon's AI. Tamotsu calls to tell the flight number that Teruki is on but is fatally shot by a sniper. Rin boards the plane as it takes off, only to find Kamiyama shot by android Ruon. Ruon is revealed to have manipulated the military to get Teruki, the only person she cares about. Rin pushes Teruki out of the plane with a parachute and after a brief fight, she and Ruon fall out of the plane and into its jet engine together. Some time later, Teruki finds that Rin's office was demolished. Mimi is shown bringing flowers to where Tamotsu was shot. Rin's fate is uncertain.
5	"Holy Nights Don't Shine Brightly"; Transliteration: "Seiya wa Kagayakanai" (Japanese: 聖夜は輝かない)	2055	June 1, 2008	
Thirty years later, the borders between 1.0 and 2.0 have been erased completely and it is now possible to "download" things into the real world. Rin took 25 years to regenerate her body and suffered retrograde amnesia in process. Teruki became a successful businessman and Mimi, a Buddhist nun. Meanwhile, Apos had disguised Laura as Rin and made her hunt immortals for their time fruits. The episode begins with Teruki's daughter Mishio discovering his records of Rin and by chance, meeting her amnesiac self. Rin is working for a company whose CEO is an immortal who is soon killed by Laura. Mishio finds her body, and thinking that her killer was Rin, starts following her around. She witnesses a man named Ihika propose to Rin, which she refuses, telling him of her amnesia. After Mishio asks Teruki about Rin, he finds her but decides that it's better for her painful memories not to return and avoids contact. He then finds Mimi who tells him that Rin is apparently hunting immortals. Meanwhile, Rin accepts Ihika's new proposal and the two are about to have sex, when Laura attacks and kills them both. This returns Rin's memories and she escapes with Mishio to Teruki's estate. After a conversation with him, Rin and Mishio take a train to Kyoto, where Mimi's temple is located. Anticipating Laura's attack, Mimi invites three other immortals but Laura brings along several angels who proceed to devour them. Rin arrives and defeats Laura and the angels, only to witness Mimi raped by Apos. Apos is then revealed to be an immortal angel hybrid and removes Rin's time fruit, presumably killing her.
6	"And Then, to the Door of the Kingdom..."; Transliteration: "Soshite Ōkoku no Tobira e to..." (Japanese: そして王国の扉へと......)	2055	July 6, 2008	
Rin wakes up in Apos' castle at the foot of Yggdrasil, the mythical tree that generates time fruits, since Apos let her regenerate instead of consuming her time fruit. She is then locked in a room with a masked angel and kills him, only to discover that it was Ihika. Meanwhile, Mimi and Mishio desperately search for Rin and learn the location of Apos' castle from the informant. Tajimamori, former Guardian of Yggdrasil, invites them to his castle, explains that his son Apos aims to become the new eternal Guardian by sacrificing Rin to Yggdrasil, and opens a portal to Apos' castle for them. There, Rin is losing the battle against Laura but Apos double-crosses the assassin and Rin escapes. In retaliation, Laura teams up with Mimi and Mishio and leads them to Yggdrasil. Rin is already there and meets Tajimamori, her millennia-old love. Tajimamori places his mark on Rin's abdomen so that she ovulates. They have sex until Apos arrives, kills his father after Tajimamori ejaculates inside Rin's womb, and pushes Rin into Yggdrasil. Mishio tries pulling Rin out and fails but Rin manages to grab Koki's time fruit (that Rin found in the sea after episode four and Mishio unwittingly brought to the castle) from her necklace. As Yggdrasil tries to merge with her, Rin consumes Koki's time fruit and his spirit helps her to break free. Mishio, revealed to be Tajimamori's descendant like all Maenos, pulls Rin out and back to the castle. Apos attacks them but Rin, now the new Guardian of Yggdrasil, pushes Apos into it himself. Before he is consumed, she feeds Tajimamori and Laura's time fruits to him. In the epilogue, Rin gives birth to Tajimamori's son and continues living in Apos' castle with Mimi and Mishio. Her closing narration reveals that their son is linked to the Yggdrasil and this link will spread throughout mankind with his descendants.

== Reception ==
Zac Bertschy from Anime News Network regards Mnemosyne as a "totally edgy anime for adults" that he felt "like halfway-decent dark erotica" that presents some unique ideas for the plot. He acknowledges that "it's difficult to honestly care about any of these characters" but its confusing and yet compelling aspects grasp the audience's attention. He criticized the amount of violence and sex that resulted in exhaustion and unpleasantness that led to "the whole trashy appeal". In conclusion, this is a series that should not be taken seriously and recommended it to those who are looking for "fun, weird, entertaining sleaze without a hint of irony or cutesiness".

Others differ from Bertschy's interpretation. Tom Tonthat argues that Mnemosyne features animation which is memorable and tells a good story, with mundane cases spiraling into sinister plots that endanger humanity itself, but is also a clearly adult series due to the level of nudity and sex. He adds that while the anime series is an "erotic thriller" it has high production values with some beautifully animated and well-choreographed fights between characters. This is coupled with an engaging story and each episode representing a year of the timeline between 1990 and 2055, including different technological developments which either change characters or the plot. He ends the review by stating that this anime does a good job of telling a story, a "guilty pleasure anime" for which you should give much thought to the "blood smoothie or angel sex", concluding it is a form of "supernatural film noir" worth a look at, although hindered by the "heavy use of shocking sex and violence".

On June 12, 2015, the Chinese Ministry of Culture listed Rin: Daughters of Mnemosyne among 38 anime and manga titles banned in China.
