= Mitsuru Ishihara =

Japanese animator

- 石原満
- Born: Japan
- Occupations: Character design and animation director

Mitsuru Ishihara (石原満, Ishihara Mitsuru) is a Japanese animator and character designer affiliated with Xebec. Some of Ishihara's major character design works include the Megaman NT Warrior anime series, D.I.C.E., Rin: Daughters of Mnemosyne, and Tokyo ESP.

== Filmography ==
Year	Title	Crew role	Notes	Source
1998	Bakusō Kyōdai Let's & Go!! MAX	Character design		
1998–99	Super Yo-Yo	Character design		
2002	Ape Escape (Excited Saru Getchu)	Character design		
2003–06	MegaMan NT Warrior series	Character design	Axxess, Stream, Beast, Beast+ and 2005 film	
2005–06	D.I.C.E.	Character design		
2008	Mnemosyne	Character design, Animation director		
2014	Tokyo ESP	Sub-character Design		
2014	Space Battleship Yamato 2199	Animation director, Mecha animation director		
