= Project Blue Earth SOS =

Japanese anime television series

- Cover from the DVD release of the series, depicting the main characters

ProjectBLUE 地球SOS (PurojekutoBURŪ Chikyū Esuōesu)
- Genre: Science fiction, Action, Adventure
- Created by: Based on Chikyū SOS by Shigeru Komatsuzaki
- Anime television series
- Directed by: Tensai Okamura
- Written by: Ryōta Yamaguchi; Masanao Akahoshi
- Music by: Michiru Oshima
- Studio: A.C.G.T
- Licensed by: NA: Funimation
- Original network: AT-X
- Original run: July 2, 2006 – December 3, 2006
- Episodes: 6

Project Blue Earth SOS (Japanese: ProjectBLUE 地球SOS, Hepburn: Purojekuto Burū Chikyū Esuōesu) is an anime series consisting of six hour-long (with commercials) episodes. It was aired on the Japanese television network, AT-X, from July 2 to December 3, 2006. It was originally licensed by ADV Films for $180,000. In 2008, it became one of over 30 ADV titles transferred to Funimation Entertainment.

It is an adaptation of a novel by science fiction illustrator Shigeru Komatsuzaki, written between 1948 and 1951.

== Plot summary ==
The entire series takes place in a version of the nineties redone into Retro-futurism, being behind in current technologies, and far ahead in others. On January 1, 1995, a G-Reactive fighter plane was being tested, while it was hit by a mysterious rainbow light and disappeared. 5 years later, two boys, Billy Kimura and Penny Carter, meet at a train station where a new bullet train utilizing G-Reactive was being launched. However, to their shock, the train was hit by a rainbow beam of light, and disappeared. After a series of events and acquaintances, the two boys discover that aliens were beginning to invade Earth. Fortunately, scientists developed the Sky Knight, a fighter plane capable of defending the world. As the extraterrestrials begin to invade, Billy, Penny, and their comrades begin their attempt to save the human race from the alien menace.

== Characters ==
Billy Kimura
Voiced by: Akeno Watanabe (Japanese); Connor Heaton (English)
Boy genius and heir to the Kimura Industries conglomerate, developers of the new G-Reaction power system. Extremely intelligent with an aggressively "take action" attitude. He has a crush on Lotta, a rivalry with Penny and doesn't like dogs much.
Penny Carter
Voiced by: Mitsuki Saiga (Japanese); Clint Bickham (English)
Boy genius number two graduated from MIT at the age of 11. Just as intelligent and prone to impulsive action as Billy. Penny goes nowhere without his sidekick, Washington, a large dog. He doesn't have the financial resources that Billy does, so his solutions to problems are often methods of ingenious improvisation.
Lotta Brest
Voiced by: Ryō Hirohashi (Japanese); Morgan Starr (English)
Daughter of Dr. Brest, a leading scientist. She has been a close friend of Billy since they were small children. She often tags along with Billy, occasionally even resorting to stowing away to achieve this end. She is fond of her "little sister", Myusha.
Emily
Voiced by: Sayaka Ohara (Japanese); Shannon Emerick (English)
A fetching young woman theoretically in charge of tutoring Lotta. In practice, she functions more like a governess, being Lotta's constant companion and overseer. Intelligent and resourceful in her own right, she drives a customized pink hover car.
Captain Clayton
Voiced by: Masaru Ikeda (Japanese); Marty Fleck (English)
A dyed-in-the-wool military man. Several years ago he was in charge of test flights for Trick Star, a new fighter jet equipped with a still experimental G-Reaction engine. During one of these flights, the fighter disappeared after reporting flying saucers. Ever since, Clayton has been trying, seemingly unsuccessfully, to convince the Powers That Be of the necessity of being prepared to meet the threat of alien invasion.
Dr. Brest
Voiced by: Shinji Ogawa (Japanese); Eric Chase (English)
Lotta's father. One of the world's leading scientists. He has been charged with developing the technology the world will need to defeat the aliens. He is often so wrapped up in his work that he sends Lotta to various functions in his place.
James
Voiced by: Yūji Ueda (Japanese); Gray Haddrock (English)
Brash, young, 20-something pilot of the Trick Star. Capable of flying anything with wings - or anything without wings for that matter. As long as it was designed to fly, he can fly it. During a test flight, he reported seeing glowing lights in the sky and flying saucers. He hasn't been seen since, but reports of his death seem to have been premature.

== Episode list ==
No.	Title	Original release date
1	"Mysterious Flying-Saucer Invasion! Sky Knight Takes Off!"; Transliteration: "Kaienban shuurai! Sukainaito hasshin se yo!" (Japanese: 怪円盤襲来！ スカイナイト発進せよ！)	July 2, 2006
2	"Appearance of the Fortress Island! Metropolitan X's Critical Moment!"; Transliteration: "Yousaitou shutsugen! Metoroporitan X kiki ippatsu!" (Japanese: 要塞島出現！ メトロポリタンX危機一髪！)	August 6, 2006
3	"The Invasion's Evil Influence! The G-Reactor Won't Operate!"; Transliteration: "Shinryaku no mashu! G hannouro sadou sezu!" (Japanese: 侵略の魔手！ G反応炉作動せず！)	September 3, 2006
4	"The Aliens' Trap! "Invincible" Responds!"; Transliteration: "Ryuuseijin no wana! Inbinshiburu gou outou se yo!" (Japanese: 遊星人の罠！ インビブル号応答せよ！)	October 1, 2006
5	"Extreme Offense and Defense! Solve the "Element" Riddle!"; Transliteration: "Kyokugen no koubou! Eremento nazo o toke!" (Japanese: 極限の攻防！ エレメント・謎を解け！)	November 5, 2006
6	"Super-Weapon Sortie! Battle at Earth's Final Hour!"; Transliteration: "Chouheiki shutsugeki! Chikyuu saigo no tatakai!" (Japanese: 超兵器出撃！ 地球最期の戦い！)	December 3, 2006

== Reception ==
In a review for the first DVD volume, Anime News Network's Carl Kimlinger had called the show as a "throw back to the gee-wiz adventures of 50's B-cinema and the likes of Tom Swift". Although he does state that it has some of the cliches of an ordinary 50's alien action film. He also praised the director Tensai Okamura for making the show simple and futuristic, that recalls American animation than anime. Kinlinger had said that ADV's take on the dub was overall decent, although he states that it does not have the enthusiasm as the original Japanese dub.
