= Kaleido Star =

Japanese anime television series

- Volume 1 DVD cover (US release)

カレイドスター (Kareido Sutā)
- Genre: Drama, sports
- Created by: Junichi Sato
- Anime television series
- Directed by: Junichi Sato (1–26); Yoshimasa Hiraike (27–51)
- Produced by: Yoshiyuki Furuya; Takeshi Sasamura; Shunji Namiki
- Written by: Reiko Yoshida
- Music by: Mina Kubota
- Studio: Gonzo; G&G Entertainment
- Licensed by: Crunchyroll (streaming); NA: ADV Films (expired)
- Original network: TV Tokyo
- English network: US: Crunchyroll Channel
- Original run: 4 April 2003 – 27 March 2004
- Episodes: 51
Further information
Original video animation
New Wings: Extra Stage
Directed by	Yoshimasa Hiraike
Produced by	Yasushi Uchida; Teruhisa Miyata
Written by	Reiko Yoshida
Music by	Mina Kubota
Studio	Gonzo; G&G Entertainment
Licensed by	NA: ADV Films (expired)
Released	24 September 2004
Runtime	25 minutes
Anime television film
Legend of Phoenix: Layla Hamilton Story
Directed by	Junichi Sato
Produced by	Shinsaku Hatta; Asuka Yamazaki; Hironori Kamada
Written by	Reiko Yoshida
Music by	Mina Kubota
Studio	Gonzo
Licensed by	NA: Funimation
Original network	TV Tokyo
Released	11 December 2005
Runtime	50 minutes
Original video animation
It's Good! Good!!
Directed by	Yoshimasa Hiraike
Produced by	Tatsuji Watabe
Written by	Reiko Yoshida
Music by	Mina Kubota
Studio	Gonzo, G&G Entertainment
Released	27 September 2006
Runtime	25 minutes
Manga
Kaleido Star: Wings of the Future
Written by	Junichi Sato
Illustrated by	Sho Nakamura
Published by	Leed
Magazine	Shōnen Fang
Original run	April 2007 – September 2009
Volumes	6
- icon

Kaleido Star (カレイドスター, Kareido Sutā) is a Japanese anime television series produced by Gonzo. It was created by Junichi Sato, who also directed the first season, and written by Reiko Yoshida. Kaleido Star: New Wings was directed by Yoshimasa Hiraike. Three original video animations have been produced, as well as a manga series and a novel. The series follows Sora Naegino, a young Japanese girl, who travels to the United States to fulfill her dream of performing at the world-famous Kaleido Stage.

== Plot ==
=== First season ===
Sora Naegino is a young Japanese girl with great acrobatic talent who travels to Cape Mery (a mix of Los Angeles and San Francisco), California to participate in auditions for the Kaleido Stage, a world-famous circus which has mesmerized her since childhood. However, she runs into difficulties as soon as she arrives. She gets lost on her way to the Stage, is leered at by a mysterious stranger, and has her bag stolen by a thief. Employing her acrobatic skills, Sora chases down the criminal. A kind police officer takes her to Kaleido Stage, only to discover she had missed her audition, an event upon which her idol Layla Hamilton advises her to return to Japan. However, after a performer is injured, the owner of the circus, Kalos, offers her a chance to perform. Having seen her earlier chase, Kalos reconsiders and informs Layla that Sora's performance will eventually be the main act at the circus, earning her reluctant respect.

=== New Wings ===
Sora returns to the stage after attempting the Legendary Great Maneuver with Layla, leaving the latter unable to perform. The absence of her co-star, who has retired to pursue a career Broadway productions, prompts a slight decline of the Kaleido Stage. As a result, Kalos brings in a new rookie star, Leon Oswald, who disapproves Sora as worthy of being on the stage with him. This leads to the most talented of the new Kaleido Stage rookie entertainers, the Cantonese-American May Wong (who is also an ex-figure skater) to challenge Sora's position as Leon's partner and star of the show.

=== The Amazing Princess Without a Smile ===
As its title suggests, the OVA follows a princess who cannot smile while her jester hopes return it. The idea for the production came to Mia from a painting that featured a character that looked identical to Rosetta and a jester in the background that looked surprisingly like Fool. Rosetta is assigned the lead role as the princess. Despite the possibility of her being able to understand the role completely, she has difficulties acting out the part and leaves the rehearsals frustrated.

=== Legend of Phoenix: Layla Hamilton Story ===
Layla and Sora are about to launch different interpretations of the same show "Legend of Phoenix" on opposite coasts. Layla is preparing at the Broadway but is dissatisfied with her performance. She feels that she cannot perform the role properly if she is not truly reborn as a new Layla Hamilton. In a desperate attempt to be reborn, Layla runs off on a solo bicycle trip to upstate New York to rediscover herself. Meanwhile, Sora is also attempting to find her own Phoenix, but when she learns of Layla's disappearance she, Ken and May run off to New York to find the former Kaleido Star who at that instant was on a bike journey with no set destination.

=== Good da yo! Goood!! ===
Good da yo! Goood!! is a 22-minute OVA that is rendered by computer graphics. All of the characters are presented super deformed. The OVA is split up into three parts. The first part is a lesson in Chinese cuisine presented by May Wong, with mapo doufu being the presented dish. The second part is a lesson on how to use the diabolo by Rosetta Passel. The final part is a lesson in seal lingo presented by Marion and Jonathan to Sora.

== Media ==
=== Season 1 ===
No.	Title	Original air date	English air date
1	"First! Amazing! Stage"; Transliteration: "Hajimete no! Sugoi! Sutēji" (Japanese: 初めての! すごい! ステージ)	April 3, 2003	TBA
Sora Naegino, a talented girl with the dream of performing on the Kaleido Stage, traveled from Japan to Los Angeles and meets the head of the Kaleido Stage, Kalos Eido. Shortly afterwards, a thief runs off with her luggage, and she uses her acrobatic skills to catch up and retrieve it. Combined with time lost at the police station, she ends up missing the audition. Sora asks Layla Hamilton for an audition, but rejects. In the dressing room, Sora meets Fool, a mysterious spirit of the stage only seen by her. Sora's efforts fail and she is depressed, but Kalos accepts her into the Kaleido Stage.
2	"My Amazing, Lonely Challenge"; Transliteration: "Kodoku na Sugoi Charenji" (Japanese: 孤独なすごいチャレンジ)	April 17, 2003	TBA
Sora deals with Fool who indicates her as a future star performer. However, the other performers view Sora with jealousy, because she qualified without an audition. Motivated, she cleans the stage early in the morning. After the cleaning work, she ends up late to ballet lessons. During practice, she stumbles and draws further disrespect from the other performers. In addition, she blurts out her prospect of performing Layla's special trapeze trick, the "Golden Phoenix". Overhearing Sora's boast, Layla is adamant that she will practice and perform the trick in one week's time. Motivated to earn respect, she learns the trick with the help of Ken, even without prior experience handling the swings. As she trained, Sora shares her determination with Mia Guillem and Anna Heart, whom she gains support and friendship. Sora persistence earns Layla's approval.
3	"The Amazing Distant Stage"; Transliteration: "Tōi Sugoi Sutēji" (Japanese: 遠いすごいステージ)	April 24, 2003	TBA
Fool reiterates his claim of Sora as the stage's "chosen one". For the next stage production, Cinderella, everyone is given a role except Sora. Disappointed, she complains but is assigned the task of distributing toys to the audience children. She feels doubtful and demotivated as a toy distributor and makes mistakes early. After one day, Fool advises her to create her own path. So, she takes up a clown outfit and treats her job as a performance. However, she makes the mistake of delaying a show, which makes her reflect upon her job.
4	"Try Hard and You'll Get an Amazing Chance"; Transliteration: "Ganbareba Sugoi Chansu" (Japanese: がんばればすごいチャンス)	May 1, 2003	TBA
The Cinderella production is presented, and Sora meets Marion Benigni back stage. During practice, Mia struggles her role's trampoline portion, and Layla threatens to cancel the performance. The next day, Mia's proposes to share the fairy godmother role with her two friends. Given three days, the three friends practice their own specially designed acrobatic routine, The Triple Illusion. During practice, Marion struggles with the idea of other trampoliners replacing her dead mother. Furthermore, Layla is adamant to replace Sora and Anna with more qualified trampoliners. Upon talking with Marion's father, Sora practices on her own to Marion's satisfaction. Mia and Anna join the practice to perfect their routine, after which Kalos grants them their proposal.
5	"My Amazing Distant Family"; Transliteration: "Itsumo Sugoi Tooi Kazoku" (Japanese: いつもすごい遠い家族)	May 5, 2003	TBA
Sora's adopted father makes a surprise visit to Kaleido Stage. For the debut of the Triple Illusion, the team performs poorly and receives a negative review the next day. The review spread to her worried father and among the performers. In another performance, the three continue to struggle, and Sora's father sees the negative atmosphere back stage. Worried, he suggests for her to return with him back to Japan. Soon afterwards, her father has a heart attack. With one hour until another performance, Sora runs off to her hospitalized father. Upon missing a performance, she decides to return home, but before boarding the flight, she becomes depressed once again, expressing her childhood dream of performing. As her father lets her return to Kaleido Stage, Sora apologizes to the stage crew and follows up with a better performance.
6	"The Amazing Seal"; Transliteration: "Chiisakute Sugoi Ottosei" (Japanese: 小さくてすごいオットセイ)	May 8, 2003	TBA
Prancing happily on the beach, Sora trips over an unconscious baby seal, whom she names Jonathan. She sadly sneaks the seal back to the dormitory with the intent upon keeping and taking care of him. Apart from Kaleido Stage work, Sora fills up her daily schedule with part-time job over Layla's objections. Eventually, the duplicated workload renders Sora exhausted, and her concerned friends look to pick up some of the burden. However, Sarah Dupont shows a flyer of a juggling contest, where first prize can feed Jonathan for a month. Having never juggled before, Sora and friends work on a routine, so Kalos returns and sees the juggling act. After some convinces, he allows Sora to keep Jonathan as a company mascot, under the care of Marion and her father.
7	"The Amazing Girl Who Doesn't Smile"; Transliteration: "Warawanai Sugoi Shōjo" (Japanese: 笑わないすごい少女)	May 15, 2003	TBA
At Jonathan's new pool, Marion notices the arrival of a new performer, Rosetta Passel a diabolo expert. As her fan, Sora tries to befriend her, but displays a perfectionist attitude. Despite one perfectly executed performance, she failed to gain the interest of the audience, and Kalos rejects her offer to perform again. Emphasizing her own perfection, Sora does not understand the importance of the audience and runs off. After Sora pleads for another chance, Kalos assigns her as Rosetta's partner and allows Sora to improve Rosetta's performance for six days. Having never performed with a diabolo, Sora learns the skill and ends up teaching Rosetta about enjoyment on stage. After the diabolo battle performance together, Rosetta changes her attitude and returns home.
8	"An Amazing Star Even in Tough Times"; Transliteration: "Tsurakutemo Sugoi Sutā" (Japanese: つらくてもすごいスター)	May 22, 2003	TBA
Before a performance, Layla receives some roses from her father who owns a large hotel chain. After the performance, Kalos, Sora, and her friends are invited to the birthday party of Layla's father. Sora makes numerous interactions with Layla and her father, and she notices the distant relationship between the two girls, especially when guests are paid to attend Layla's birthday and her annual cancellation of the party. Upon speaking with Layla, Sora makes plans and actions to bring the father-daughter pair closer together. After a public birthday wish at a performance, Layla receives a note from her father, and she receives it heartfully, despite expressing feelings of humiliation to Sora.
9	"My Amazing Challenge for the Lead Role"; Transliteration: "Shuyaku e no Sugoi Chōsen" (Japanese: 主役への すごい 挑戦)	May 29, 2003	TBA
Kaleido Stage is presenting a new stage production, The Little Mermaid. Mr. Kenneth wants someone other than Layla to play the lead role. During the audition, Sora becomes the only candidate and makes an attempt at the featured trick: a trapeze triple somersault jump through flowing water. Her attempt fails, and she is rendered injured and afraid of falling. Upon consulting Fool, Sora must conquer this fear or she will lose her ability to see him. With the help of Ken and a martial arts specialist, Sora gradually works to restore her confidence.
10	"Facing an Amazing Wall"; Transliteration: "Shuyaku e no Sugoi Kabe" (Japanese: 主役へのすごい壁)	June 5, 2003	TBA
Sora happily goes through her schedule as the leading role, including photoshoots, practices, etc. After some performances, the opinions of audiences on the Little Mermaid have been lackluster, and attendance decreases. Being afraid of poor reviews, Sora must study her role and experiment to "make the performance her own" by incorporating her personality. When the stage crew gets upset, she figures out the role of a mermaid and shares her ideas. With some script adjustments, the production crew finally entertains the audience.
11	"Anna's Not so Amazing Father"; Transliteration: "Anna no Sugokunai Otōsan" (Japanese: アンナの すごくない お父さん)	June 12, 2003	TBA
After the Little Mermaid performance, Anna reads about a comedy act performed by her father, Jack Barron, whom she had not seen in a while. However, Anna had maintained contact via correspondence. In a comedy class, they watch his bitter and cynical act, insulting the audience. This "new" version of her father is stark in contrast to the father she remembers, and she runs out of the comedy club. Upon calling her mother, Anna attends Jack's comedy act once more dressed as a waitress to confront him on stage. Together, the two talk through some old truths and reconcile.
12	"An Amazing Hot New Production"; Transliteration: "Atsui Sugoi Shinsaku" (Japanese: 熱いすごい新作)	June 19, 2003	TBA
As Layla rejects a film role, Sora gets the chance to co-star with Layla in the next production, Arabian Nights. The featured act involves a tight rope act attached to a rocking ship. Layla immediately mounts the tight rope and tries out some gymnastics maneuvers. For the production, Kalos adds the idea of the ship surrounded by flames. Both Layla and Sora think through the idea of co-starring and dedicate a week of practice towards the viability of co-starring. With the help of others, Sora quickly learns to handle the movable tight rope despite inexperience with the tight rope. After a locker room prank, she brings the diabolo into her routine to address the issue of falling. For the audition, Sora uses an innovative diabolos trick and demonstrates her ability to co-star with Layla.
13	"The Amazing Competition Calls Up a Storm"; Transliteration: "Arashi o Yobu Sugoi Kyōen" (Japanese: 嵐を呼ぶ すごい 競演)	June 26, 2003	TBA
With one week until the show's opening day, the practice for the tight rope act is underway, and Layla and Sora have issues regarding synchronization. Layla looks to observe Sora's daily activity to address this issue, which includes living in Sora's dorm room. As a result, the two learn to synchronize with each other. Their practice improves, but the stage director looks to tone down the climactic scene. On the last practice day, Sora and Layla practice on a tight rope rigged to a boat out in open water. Layla looks to stage a "real fight", and the two host a duel on the tight rope using stage props, even in the middle of a stormy day. After practice, Layla shares her reason to join Kaleido Stage. The next morning, they return to start the show on time.
14	"Mysterious Amazing Circus"; Transliteration: "Ayashii Sugoi Sākasu" (Japanese: 怪しいすごいサーカス)	July 3, 2003	TBA
Instead of vacation, Kalos assigns Sora as a guest performer for a faraway circus group called "Theatrical Camp", accompanied by Ken. The two arrive at a rustic town with a rustic circus. For the next performance, Sora is assigned as the lead princess role. The following day, Ken and Sora find out that the group does not dedicate time for rehearsal. Sora is advised to notice the individual performers and their specialized acts. For her first performance, she is simply shoved into stage and humiliated on stage. Despite this, Sora figures out to adaptation and improvised performance interaction with everyone. Later, she learns the trapeze specialist used to work for Kaleido Stage.
15	"The Songstress' Amazing Love"; Transliteration: "Utahime no Sugoi Ai" (Japanese: 歌姫のすごい愛)	July 10, 2003	TBA
A love triangle resurfaces between Kalos, Sarah, and an old friend named Andy. After speaking with Kalos, Sarah is left crying after being told to be "no longer needed". Speaking with Sora, Sarah reveals an old picture of herself with Kalos and Andy, and she talks about the beginnings of Kaleido Stage and her reasons for staying the past ten years. Despite Sora's plea, Kalos maintains his stoic decision in front of Andy. Just as Sarah leaves with Andy, Sora and the others execute a plan. In Kalos' office, Sora teases Kalos to reveal his true feelings, while Fool looks for evidence. Later, the others bring Sarah to the stage, and she listens to Kalos' words via Sora's hidden microphone. With the truth revealed, Sora leaves Sarah and Kalos alone together.
16	"An Amazing Black Rumor"; Transliteration: "Kuroi Sugoi Uwasa" (Japanese: 黒いすごい噂)	July 17, 2003	TBA
Manami, Sora's old friend, visits Kaleido Stage on the way to Boston. Throughout the day, Manami overhears various backstage discussions and observes Sora's regular day schedule. During practice the following day, Yuri takes Sora out to lunch and offers her a job outside Kaleido Stage. He reveals his intent on creating a new circus to rival Kaleido Stage. Kaleido Stage workers also leave, leading further performances to be canceled. After the last Arabian Nights show, Yuri makes his separation official while Manami is satisfied about Sora's choices. Wanting to keep Kaleido Stage in operation, Mia submits ideas for the next show as Kalos orders its one-week preparation.
17	"Fire Up! Amazing Mia"; Transliteration: "Moero! Sugoi Mia" (Japanese: 燃えろ! すごいミア)	July 24, 2003	TBA
Entrusted with the next show, Mia devotes her efforts towards writing the script. Layla turns to Simon, an experienced scriptwriter. Sora also talks to Yuri about his motivation towards dismantling Kaleido Stage, which involves revenge for his deceased father. The next day, Mia presents her rough draft, and Layla disapproves. However, Kalos appoints Mia as the director, and Simon is assigned as Mia's mentor and the script supervisor. Just as Mia almost quits writing, Sora inspires her with additional story ideas and Mia asks the others to practice some routines, even with an unfinished script. The show became successful one week later.
18	"Yuri's Amazing Trap"; Transliteration: "Yūri no Sugoi Wana" (Japanese: ユーリのすごい罠)	July 31, 2003	TBA
Kaleido Stage continues to thrive with Mia's production. However, their hopes are dashed, as Yuri takes ownership of Kaleido Stage and cancels the remaining performances of Mia's show. Likewise, anyone refusing to work for Yuri resign their positions at Kaleido Stage. Regardless of the circumstances, Layla continues to view Sora as a worthy partner, but her father makes a greater presence on her career path. With the transfer of Kaleido Stage, the stage crew have one last show, but Sora deals with the bleak outlook of Kalos' words and not seeing Fool. She also contemplates the last performance as the end, but overhears Layla's conversation with Yuri, after which they move on with good spirits.
19	"Amazing Family Bonds"; Transliteration: "Kazoku no Sugoi Kizuna" (Japanese: 家族のすごい絆)	August 7, 2003	TBA
Sora, Anna, and Mia move on from Kaleido Stage together. With their new life, they temporarily stay at Ken's home. As Sora thinks about her pregnant mother, they find a new place to stay with the help of Mr. Policeman. Sora's adopted parents suddenly fly over for a visit and ask her to return to Japan. During the conversation, she utters some heartbreaking words and upsets her mother, but her mother immediately goes into premature labor. With tears full of guilt, Sora is afraid of the idea of a miscarriage, but the delivery of a newborn girl is successful. Mending with her mother, Sora is given the privilege of naming her new sister, Yume.
20	"An Amazing Change From Zero"; Transliteration: "Zero kara no Sugoi Sutāto" (Japanese: ゼロからのすごいスタート)	August 14, 2003	TBA
Sora and friends, who had not worked for two weeks, attend the first Kaleido Stage production under Yuri. They work at a seafood restaurant, which ends shortly after humiliating themselves in front of Yuri. Upon Sarah's return, she arrives with a job opportunity at the marine park. While applying for the job, they invite other former Kaleido Stage members, including Rosetta. On the other hand, Layla rejects. At the marine park, the group is notified of a show cancellation, which brings suspicion of Yuri's intervention. Nevertheless, they perform their routines in the park and impress the park attendees. During their impromptu show, Sarah realizes that Kalos actually canceled the performance to give them an opportunity to perform in a more open space with a bigger audience. Just before an angry park owner interrupts their performances, Dio and a mysterious masked performer arrive.
21	"The Amazing Masked Star"; Transliteration: "Nazo no Sugoi Kamen Sutā" (Japanese: 謎のすごい仮面スター)	August 21, 2003	TBA
Sora and friends are granted a contract with the marine park on condition of more appearances by the masked performer as the featured attraction. However, unable to guarantee masked performer appearances, Sora disguises as the masked performer. The next day, they meet two children who sought their autographs, leading Sora to be motivated to perform. Prior to performance time, Mia devises a balloon themed performance while Sora does the rope jump as the masked performer arrives. For a better view, the two children climb a dangerous ladder, prompting Sora and the masked performer to save them.
22	"The Amazing Resolve Beneath The Mask"; Transliteration: "Kamen no Shita no Sugoi Kakugo" (Japanese: 仮面の下のすごい覚悟)	August 28, 2003	TBA
As performances at the marine park continue, Yuri is aware of her identity as the masked performer and Layla's father confronts her about it. Yuri buys out a large number of marine park tickets as revenge for the cancellation of Sora's contract. This forces the group to enter a performance competition in Vancouver, where Yuri is reportedly one of the judges. Concerned about Sora, Layla temporarily leaves her film production and helps with the group's performance as the masked performer. Afterwards, Layla's identity is revealed in front of everyone, including her own father. She expresses her desire to continue performing and gains the ability to see Fool.
23	"The Legendary Amazing Maneuver"; Transliteration: "Maboroshi no Sugoi Oowaza" (Japanese: 幻のすごい大技)	September 4, 2003	TBA
Now able to see Fool, Layla is reasserted by Sora and he informs the two about their worthiness for the Legendary Great Maneuver, which risks the lives of any performer attempting the trick. Keeping the maneuver secret, he gives them the idea of performing the maneuver together. Kaleido Stage suffers attendance rates under Yuri's management, Yuri informs her decision as she seeks Layla's return. An angry Yuri reveals the intention of performing the maneuver in public without consultation. Given one month to train, Layla throws the ownership of Kaleido Stage as a wager. Together with the other performers, they meet up with Kalos for managing at the Grand Canyon. Upon arrival, Sora and Layla begin the relentless and necessary physical regiment.
24	"The Amazing Intensive Training Continues"; Transliteration: "Mada Tsuzuku Sugoi Tokkun" (Japanese: まだ続くすごい特訓)	September 11, 2003	TBA
25	"An Amazing Bond"; Transliteration: "Futari no Sugoi Kizuna" (Japanese: ふたりのすごい絆)	September 18, 2003	TBA
26	"An Amazing Comeback"; Transliteration: "Kizudarake no Sugoi Fukkatsu" (Japanese: 傷だらけのすごい復活)	September 25, 2003	TBA

==== Season 2 ====
No.	Title	Original air date	English air date
27	"Amazing Prologue to Stardom (Part 1)"; Transliteration: "Sutā e no Sugoi Purorōgu (Zenpen)" (Japanese: スターへのすごいプロローグ(前編))	October 4, 2003	TBA
Fool recounts Sora's career as a performer from joining Kaleido Stage up to the Arabian Nights show.
28	"Amazing Prologue to Stardom (Part 2)"; Transliteration: "Sutā e no Sugoi Purorōgu (Kōhen)" (Japanese: スターへのすごいプロローグ(後編))	October 11, 2003	TBA
Fool recounts Sora's career as a performer from joining Kaleido Stage up to the Legendary Great Maneuver.
29	"An Amazing New Rival"; Transliteration: "Atarashii Sugoi Raibaru" (Japanese: 新しいすごいライバル)	October 18, 2003	TBA
30	"The Amazing Newcomer"; Transliteration: "Mou Hitori no Sugoi Shinjin" (Japanese: もう一人のすごい新人)	October 25, 2003	TBA
31	"The Amazing Passionate Rival"; Transliteration: "Jōnetsu no Sugoi Raibaru" (Japanese: 情熱のすごいライバル)	November 1, 2003	TBA
32	"Amazing Match On Ice"; Transliteration: "Kōri no Ue no Sugoi Taiketsu" (Japanese: 氷の上のすごい対決)	November 8, 2003	TBA
The new Kaleido Stage production is going to be Dracula and Sora is competing with May for the role of Mina Murray. However, after May shows off her impressive ice skating routine, Leon decides that Mia should change the show and put it on ice. Without experience at ice skating, Sora must compete with May for the three-day role. Sora puts in a lot of effort and comes close to beating May, but Leon chooses May for the role of Mina Murray.
33	"Amazing Rosetta of Sweat and Tears"; Transliteration: "Ase to Namida no Sugoi Rozetta" (Japanese: 汗と涙のすごいロゼッタ)	November 15, 2003	TBA
34	"After All, Miss Layla is Amazing"; Transliteration: "Yappari Sugoi Reira-san" (Japanese: やっぱりすごいレイラさん)	November 22, 2003	TBA
35	"Marion's Amazing Debut"; Transliteration: "Marion no Sugoi Debyū" (Japanese: マリオンのすごいデビュー)	November 29, 2003	TBA
36	"Amazing Training With Leon"; Transliteration: "Reon to no Sugoi Tokkun" (Japanese: レオンとのすごい特訓)	December 6, 2003	TBA
37	"The Two Amazing Demons"; Transliteration: "Futari no Sugoi Akuma" (Japanese: 二人のすごい悪魔)	December 13, 2003	TBA
38	"Amazing Angelic Counterattack"; Transliteration: "Tenshi no Sugoi Hangeki" (Japanese: 天使のすごい反撃)	December 20, 2003	TBA
May demonstrates the Demon Spiral that gets Leon to agree to be her partner for the world festival. As a result, Sora goes to Paris to find Yuri where Yuri begins to train Sora for the Angel's Maneuver. Along the way, Sora befriends Mute and Alice.
39	"Cruel Amazing Festival"; Transliteration: "Zankoku na Sugoi Saiten" (Japanese: 惨酷なすごい祭典)	December 27, 2003	TBA
May gains motivation to perfect her Demon Spiral after learning that Sora will compete in the competition as well. Sora continues to train for the Angel's Maneuver, but her lack of basic balance makes it difficult. On the due date of the festival, Leon and Yuri reveal that they knew each other before. While many people perform, Sora gets the shock of her life from the betrayal of friends. Sora realizes that she wants the friendly stage that she saw as a child with her parents on the Kaleido Stage. Having won the festival three years before, Layla presents the award to the winner and expresses disappointment at Sora.
40	"Amazing and Sad Homecoming"; Transliteration: "Zetsubō no Sugoi Kikoku" (Japanese: 絶望のすごい帰国)	January 10, 2004	TBA
Everyone returns to Kaleido Stage to begin rehearsal, but Sora feels defeated, so she gives up and decides to return to Japan with her family. Sora takes the chance to spend time with her new baby sister, but Fool reminds her if she gives up, he will disappear from her sight. Meanwhile at Kaleido Stage, May begins to cause the cast to get annoyed while rehearsing. Ken and Mr. Policeman attempt to visit Sora and Minami convinces Sora to go back to Kaleido Stage.
41	"My Amazing Fresh Start"; Transliteration: "Saishuppatsu no Sugoi Ketsui" (Japanese: 再出発のすごい決意)	January 17, 2004	TBA
Sora decides to go back to Kaleido Stage even if it will help out in the background, but May disagrees with Sora's decision. May and Leon perform Romeo and Juliet with their famous move that won them the world competition, the Demon Spiral, and as they get applause from the audience, Sora becomes aware that she misses the stage. Mia gets advise from Broadway director Cathy Taymore who also criticizes Leon and May's poor partnership. When May wants to compete with Sora, Sora refuses, causing May to get upset. At night, Leon chases Sora across traffic in a trance-like state mistaking her for Sophie.
42	"An Amazing Yet Humiliating Performance"; Transliteration: "Kutsujoku no Sugoi Kyōen" (Japanese: 屈辱のすごい共演)	January 24, 2004	TBA
During the performance of Romeo and Juliet, Leon drags Sora into the performance when she is scattering flowers. Wanting to not get the audience confused, Sora competes with May, and when the audience cheered for Sora's excellent performance, May ultimately admits defeat. However, as Sora leaves the stage, Leon mistakes Sora as Sophie again and chases her falling from the trapeze. Wanting to cheer Sora up, her friends throw her a performance in the Kid's Stage.
43	"Policeman's Amazing Proposal"; Transliteration: "Porisu no Sugoi Puropōzu" (Japanese: ポリスのすごいプロポーズ)	January 31, 2004	TBA
Sora, Ken, Mr. Policeman, and his love are trapped in a bank robbery. When the Kaleido Stage is insulted, Sora performs a dazzling impromptu performance that gets the robber to turn himself in.
44	"Launching An Amazing Smile!"; Transliteration: "Egao no Sugoi Hasshin!" (Japanese: 笑顔のすごい発進!)	February 7, 2004	TBA
With Leon in the hospital, the Stage cannot open up performances so the Kaleido gang create a performance for the Kenneth Motor Show based on the theme Harmony with Nature. Sora tells Layla that Sora wants to return to the stage and Layla gets an urge to return to the stage too. Anna creates a fun caterpillar act with two others and Ken. On the day of the show, there is a net placed for the trapeze act that will prevent Sora and May from being visible or close to the audience. With little preparation, but some smart use of free ropes, Sora, May and Rosetta put on a dazzling and fun performance for all ages. As Sora adlibs weirdly, May realizes that Sora's energy is to make the audience smile.
45	"Leon's Amazing Past"; Transliteration: "Reon no Sugoi Kako" (Japanese: レオンのすごい過去)	February 14, 2004	TBA
The Kaleido gang goes to France on contract to perform for a circus. Knowing that Sora focuses on smiles, May thinks it is important that she smiles to gain Sora's brilliance. Having gone there early, Rosetta gets Leon's old coach to train her. The coach shares with the gang Leon and Sophie's training for the Angel's Maneuver. He trains Leon, thinking that the maneuver requires a strong partner. However, upon realizing that the female must have a natural talent for balance, the coach begins to give Sophie intense training. Sophie also wants to learn the maneuver to unite the audience and the star. Rosetta can perform the trapeze as the princess while May is the villain and Sora is the prince. Sora's brilliance to perform for the audience brings out May's desire to perform better again.
46	"The Amazing Fated Duel"; Transliteration: "Shukumei no Sugoi Kettō" (Japanese: 宿命のすごい決斗)	February 21, 2004	TBA
The Kaleido Stage reopens once Leon's injury is healed. Yuri provokes Leon that he made Sophie unsuccessful to get repentance. As Yuri and Leon quarrel with fencing swords on the new trapeze design, Sora intervenes. Leon remembers his promise to Sophie for her dream to unite a stage without competition and the audience. Layla appears because she has unfinished business, and Leon realizes that Sora will be his partner to make Sophie's dream come true. The next Kaleido stage performance is Swan Lake and the story will be made by Mia and Cathy.
47	"Flight of the Amazing Angel"; Transliteration: "Maiorita Sugoi Tenshi" (Japanese: 舞い降りたすごい天使)	February 28, 2004	TBA
48	"The Amazing Injured Swan"; Transliteration: "Kizutsuita Sugoi Hakuchō" (Japanese: 傷ついたすごい白鳥)	March 6, 2004	TBA
49	"Our Amazing Futures"; Transliteration: "Hitorihitori no Sugoi Ashita" (Japanese: ひとりひとりのすごい未来(あした))	March 13, 2004	TBA
As the performers work on their role for Swan Lake, Mia finds that the Kaleido stage is missing something for the climax. May also thinks about her role as Odile and gets Rosetta to be the Fairy of Light for the climax move that will save Odile called Eternal Illusion. With Leon convinced to help Sora again, she gets another set of special training with water and weights. Layla also practices the Angel's Maneuver at her home and asks for Yuri's help.
50	"A Most Amazing and Inescapable Showdown"; Transliteration: "Sakerarenai Mono Sugoi Ikkiuchi" (Japanese: 避けられないものすごい一騎討ち)	March 20, 2004	TBA
The role of Odette and the Prince must still be decided between Layla and Yuri versus Sora and Leon. On special-designed trapeze, the pairs perform in front of everyone involved in Kaleido stage. Both rivals are beautiful in their Angel's Maneuver for different reasons. Sora decides to adlib as she thinks about how to get the audience to feel their angels' hearts. The owner realizes that Layla is the demon that rises the angel necessary for the Angel's Manneuver. As they are fighting for the role, the audience of Kaleido performers remember important memories that motivated them to their dreams. Unable to help herself, Layla looks at Sora's act and upon the end of the act, says Sora is the winner.
51	"To the Amazing Promised Place"; Transliteration: "Yakusoku no Sugoi Basho e" (Japanese: 約束の すごい 場所へ)	March 27, 2004	TBA

=== Manga ===
A manga series titled Kaleido Star: Wings of the Future, began serialization in Shōnen Fang on 19 February 2007. It ended in September 2007 when the magazine went defunct.

=== Novel ===
A novel, titled Mr. Policeman's Amazing Wedding (ポリスのすごい結婚式, Porisu no Sugoi Kekkonshiki), was released on 10 February 2006.

== Reception ==
In a review of the first DVD volume, Anime News Network called the series "heartwarming fluff without too many sugar calories" and praised the Japanese voice cast for stellar performances, with particular emphasis on Ryo Hirohashi and Takehito Koyasu. Anime On DVD also noted Koyasu's performance, the quality of the animation in the performance scenes, and the fulfilling climax of the final episode. Mike Lewis of Underland Online noted Kaleido Star as "an extraordinary series is in a class all its own".

Despite being put off by the recap episodes, Anime News Network reviewed the first volume of Kaleido Star: New Wings. While criticizing the story as "straight from the shōjo drama playbook," the review held praise for the visuals, stating that "the best thing about Kaleido Star is, far and away, the amazing animation and production values. The circus scenes are wildly original and sometimes breathtaking; the animation quality hasn't dipped at all in the second season." Cynthia Martinez also won notice for developing her performance as Sora. Anime Advanced also looked at the first volume and praised it highly, noting that "Kaleido Star gets my highest possible recommendation. This is a show that dreams are made of."

Summing up the series, Chris Beveridge of Anime On DVD said that "Kaleido Star has been a great series overall with a somewhat weak second season that really took its time to find its own voice," but that "it's still a series that's very easy to recommend on a whole and one that is very much worth showing to a younger audience." ActiveAnime's Holly Ellingwood commented that "The finale is climatic and fulfilling." and summarized the series as being "An anime that is a pure joy to watch. Exhilarating, Kaleido Star is a stirring series that is both inspirational and remarkable."

AnimeOnDVD proclaimed the OVA to be "a beautiful piece of work and the best way to close out things for a while as it is much more oriented on the comedy and the lighter side of the characters... It's a great little self-contained story that plays strong in a similar fashion to the last episode of the series but without quite so much angst and hardship associated with it. It leaves you laughing and really smiling at the end of the disc."
