= List of D.N.Angel episodes =

The anime series D.N.Angel is adapted from the manga of the same name written and illustrated by Yukiru Sugisaki. Produced by Dentsu and Xebec and directed by Koji Yoshikawa and Nobuyoshi Habara, the series premiered in Japan on TV Tokyo on April 3, 2003. It ran for twenty-six episodes until its conclusion on September 25, 2003.

The series is licensed for release in North American and the United Kingdom by ADV Films, and in Australia and New Zealand by Madman Entertainment.

Five pieces of theme music are used in the anime adaptation. The song "White Night -True Light-" (白夜 〜True Light〜, Byakuya -True Light-), by Shunichi Miyamoto, is used for the opening for all twenty six episodes. For the ending theme, "Gentle Afternoon" (やさしい午後, Yasashii Gogo) is used for the first twelve episodes, and "The Day It Begins" (はじまりの日, Hajimari no Hi) is used for episodes 13-23 and episode 25. Both songs are performed by Minawo. Episode 24 uses the song "Caged Bird", by Shunichi Miyamoto, for its ending, while the final episode of the series uses Miyamoto's song "Guidepost" (道標, Michishirube).

The table below shows where and when the 26-episode anime was shown on television:

Country	Network	Pilot Episode	Final Episode
Japan	TV Tokyo	April 3, 2003	September 25, 2003
Singapore	Channel U Broadcast	October 30, 2005	April 30, 2006
Philippines	QTV Channel 11 (now known as GMA News TV Channel 11	May 8, 2006	June 12, 2006
Philippines	TV5	January 21, 2009	February 25, 2009

== Episode listing ==
No.	Title	Original release date
1	"Dark Revived"; Transliteration: "Fukkatsu no Daaku" (Japanese: 復活のダーク)	April 3, 2003
It's Daisuke Niwa's 14th birthday and he's not having a good day. He tries to confesses his feelings to Risa Harada but finds out she only likes him as a friend. A student Satoshi Hiwatari oversees Daisuke using skills he's not supposed to have in order to unlock an electronic lock at school. When he challenges the training traps at his house, Daisuke transforms into the phantom thief Dark a black angel that has reside within the male members of the Niwa family for generations with the purpose of stealing cursed artworks. Daisuke learns he can't transform back into himself until he steals the Saint Tears statue tonight, and that becoming Dark is his destiny. As Dark escapes, he flies by the Harada mansion, and kisses Risa's older twin sister Riku Harada.
2	"Rekindled Feelings"; Transliteration: "Yomigaeru Omoi" (Japanese: よみがえる思い)	April 10, 2003
Riku is confused about her encounter with Dark and why she thought of Daisuke. Daisuke's family explain he has to find his "sacred maiden" if he wants to be free of Dark. Later at school, Daisuke agrees to go Dark-spotting with Risa, but due to his 'love condition' finds himself unable to show; instead, going to steal a bird artwork from a city landmark. Dark makes a bet with Daisuke in which Dark wins.
3	"Whisper of the Unicorn"; Transliteration: "Yunico-n no Sasayaki" (Japanese: ユニコーンのささやき)	April 17, 2003
The city's young girls are being kidnapped—but by who? Daisuke and Dark have to find out, so they can save the Harada twins and steal an enchanted painting artwork of a girl and her Unicorn.
4	"Between Light and Darkness"; Transliteration: "Hikari to Yami no Hazama ni…" (Japanese: 光と闇の間に…)	April 24, 2003
After Satoshi sets up an ambush for Daisuke, Dark has a minor battle with his 'other half' Krad a white devil who resides within the Hiwatari family.
5	"Double Cooking"; Transliteration: "Daburu Kukkingu" (Japanese: ダブルクッキング)	May 1, 2003
It is Daisuke's first cooking class and an unexpected visitor comes with him: Wiz - the Niwa's family pet; Dark's familiar. Risa (Riku in disguise) and Daisuke get an exciting detention of cabbage shredding, but can Daisuke break out in time for his next phantom thief mission? In the meantime, Wiz (disguise as Daisuke) says "I like you" to Riku.
6	"St. White Memories"; Transliteration: "Sento Howaito Memoriisu" (Japanese: セント ホワイト メモリース)	May 8, 2003
Daisuke wants to buy a present for his mother's birthday… but his wallet is more than a little empty. Emiko Niwa shares the story of how she met Kosuke with Daisuke while Dark is out to "Steal The Heart Of The World's Number One Lady".
7	"Adonis Of the Promise Garden"; Transliteration: "Chikai no Niwa no Adonisu" (Japanese: 誓いの庭のアドニス)	May 15, 2003
Dark discovers the cursed statue of Adonis has been revived. Daisuke's grandfather, Daiki, reveals that he and Dark once tried to seal away Adonis long ago, but couldn't because a tsunami had swept it away along with its castle into the sea. Dark must stop the Adonis from preying on a schoolgirl's soul.
8	"Menou's Warning Letter"; Transliteration: "Menou no Yokoku Jyou" (Japanese: 瑪瑙の予告状)	May 22, 2003
Takeshi Saehara falls in love with a girl who has been bound to the Agate Links necklace for 40 years, given by Daiki. Daiki wants Daisuke to break the spell that is keeping her in the world. Daisuke gets hesitant until the end, when the girl sees his true form and thinks it's Daiki.
9	"A Little Romance"; Transliteration: "Chiisana Koi" (Japanese: 小さな恋)	May 29, 2003
Wiz discovers strawberries… and girls. Wiz falls head over heels of a lop eared bunny and Daisuke is blind of that love. When Wiz takes a strawberry to her, the shop was already closed. The next morning, Wiz's girlfriend was gone and Wiz ran all around the city looking for her. Daisuke and Riku have to ease the pain of a lost love. A storm brews up and as Daisuke changes into Dark. Dark says how its amusing for Daisuke trying to save Wiz, cause no matter how long they are apart, Wiz always comes back to Dark. Daisuke also realizes his crush on Riku.
10	"The Portrait of a Certain Musician"; Transliteration: "Aru Ongakuka no Shouzou" (Japanese: ある音楽家の肖像)	June 5, 2003
During a funeral of a violinist, Daisuke is transported back in time by a magical violin. Dark has to bring Daisuke back to the present after witnessing Daiki as a phantom thief.
11	"The Temple of Neptune"; Transliteration: "Nepuchuun no Shinden" (Japanese: 海神の神殿)	June 12, 2003
Dark must steal the Horn of Neptune from under the sea which is a big task. At the same time, Satoshi sets up his own plan to capture Dark; but unfortunately, Risa accidentally takes a stroll in middle of it.
12	"Together With Rutile…"; Transliteration: "Richiru to Tomoni" (Japanese: リチルとともに…)	June 19, 2003
Kosuke returns home from his travels to a welcoming Emiko. Daisuke is a little embarrassed at meeting his father for the first time. Daisuke has to steal a famed rutile ring, but Satoshi doesn't make it easy. Krad makes another appearance, and this time, he isn't going to be defeated so easily.
13	"The Eternal Mark"; Transliteration: "Towa no Shirube" (Japanese: 永遠の標)	June 26, 2003
When Dark goes to steal The Eternal Guide statue, a 'sealer' placed by Satoshi causes Dark, Risa and Takeshi's souls to be trapped inside a stone. To rescue them, Daisuke has to travel into what appears to be the future with Towa. While there, he stumbles upon someone special.
14	"A New Rival"; Transliteration: "Aratanaru Raibaru" (Japanese: 新たなるライバル)	July 3, 2003
Towa moves in the Niwa household as a maid. A new student, Mio Hio, arrives in Daisuke's class. She turns out to be a little more than the class bargained for and on top of that, holds a deadly secret. Satoshi saves Daisuke in swimming class by performing CPR on him. Dark takes Risa on a date, which makes Daisuke depress in the end.
15	"Barbecue Panic"; Transliteration: "Baabekyuu Panikku" (Japanese: バーベキューパニック)	July 10, 2003
It's school holidays. The Harada's limo breaks down on the way to activities—in front of Daisuke's house. Miss Hio also happens to be passing through the neighborhood. After a shopping spree, Emiko and Towa return and the lively Niwa household hosts a Barbecue.
16	"I Found It"; Transliteration: "Mitsuketayo" (Japanese: 見つけたよ)	July 17, 2003
Riku revisits her childhood memories after finding an old teddy-bear in her closet that was given to her by her grandmother, Rika. Dark goes to steal an artwork from the "haunted" Old Clover Mansion… which is where Riku lost the teddy-bear when she was younger, that it was later rescued by a boy. Risa also discovers a secret close to Dark's heart after Dark says she won't see him anymore. Riku figured out later that it is Daisuke who retrieved her precious thing, the teddy bear.
17	"A Summer Without Dark"; Transliteration: "Daaku no Inai Natsu" (Japanese: ダークのいない夏)	July 24, 2003
Daisuke's class goes on an excursion to a tropical island to watch the Milky Way. Takeshi is rather into Mio. Both Risa and Riku are increasingly attracted to Daisuke and a nature hike will determine which twin will end up with Daisuke.
18	"The Two Under The Shooting Stars"; Transliteration: "Hoshi Furu Yoru no Futari" (Japanese: 星降る夜の二人)	July 31, 2003
Riku sprains her ankle after a fall and Daisuke carries her. Mio is playing psychic. Risa suspects Daisuke of being Dark, but decides he's not when she realizes he doesn't act like Dark, becoming more mature. Daisuke finally realizes his true feelings for Riku after clearing a misunderstanding, and the two watch beautiful shooting stars falling near the beach.
19	"Beautiful Heroine"; Transliteration: "Suteki na Hiroin" (Japanese: すてきなヒロイン)	August 7, 2003
Daisuke has to create an artwork for the cultural festival. Satoshi discovers his father's, Kei Hiwatari, scheme to capture Dark. Risa uncovers secrets of the love between Dark and her grandmother Rika, in a letter hidden at the Harada mansion. Meanwhile, the boys in Daisuke's class are to be performing the play "Ice and Snow", with Daisuke and Satoshi filling the lead roles.
20	"Because I Wanted To See You"; Transliteration: "Aitakute" (Japanese: 逢いたくて)	August 14, 2003
Kosuke enlightens Daisuke with the story of "Ice and Snow". Daisuke completes his piece for the festival - a painting of a snowscape, where the shadows on the purest snow are blue instead of gray. Mio must make a very important decision. As Riku gives Daisuke the pendant of friendship instead of love, Mio sacrifices herself in the end.
21	"An Icy Voice Calling"; Transliteration: "Itetsuita Yobikoe" (Japanese: 凍てついた呼び声)	August 21, 2003
Daisuke is feeling ill. Satoshi warns Daisuke that something is up, then Kosuke has a friendly chat with Satoshi. At nightfall, Daisuke enters the world of his painting, led by an entity known as "The Second Hand of Time". Dark has to steal the painting left at the Harada's household in order to bring Daisuke back.
22	"Ice and Snow"; Transliteration: "Aisu Ando Sunou" (Japanese: アイス アンド スノウ)	August 28, 2003
Dark enters the snowscape world of the painting with both of the Harada twins in order to search and rescue Daisuke.
23	"The Second Hand of Time"; Transliteration: "Toki no Byoushin" (Japanese: 時の秒針)	September 4, 2003
Kosuke discovers the original edition of the story, entitled "Ice and Dark". Meanwhile, Daisuke meets a girl named Freedert who is one with the Second Hand of Time, waiting for her long lost lover - Elliott. Long ago, the two lovers were cursed due to a childhood friend's jealous. Dark goes in search of "The Wedge of Time" sword, a Hiwatari's family artwork which is the key to rescuing Daisuke and bringing the story to an end.
24	"Snow Falls in The Heart"; Transliteration: "Kokoro ni Yuki ga Furu" (Japanese: 心に雪が降る)	September 11, 2003
Dark battles Krad to retrieve the Wedge of Time as the Harada twins witness it all. Satoshi repaints Daisuke's painting to retrieve him. Freedert and Elliott are finally reunited. The story of Ice and Dark is completed as snow comes falling down upon the city.
25	"The Black Wings"; Transliteration: "Koku Yoku" (Japanese: 黒翼)	September 18, 2003
Once Christmas is approaching, the signs of a 40-year repeated disaster—an extreme low tide and an earthquake—prompt the city authorities to issue an evacuation. Riku worries about Daisuke and she eventually finds out about his and Dark's identity.
26	"Eternal Dark"; Transliteration: "Eien no Daaku" (Japanese: 永遠のダーク)	September 25, 2003
Once upon a time the Hiwatari family created a living artwork, known as The Black Wings. The Niwa family, a family of phantom thieves tried to steal the artwork. The artwork must now be sealed forever. Krad and Dark fight, and at the end they both are sealed into the Black Wings, from which they came from. The Harada twins help Mio to stop Kei. After Daisuke saves Satoshi from sacrificing his life, Daisuke clearly realize Riku is his sacred maiden and the two kiss, and Dark and Krad disappear peacefully.

== See also ==
- List of D.N.Angel chapters
- List of D.N.Angel characters
