= List of D.N.Angel chapters =

Cover of the first tankōbon volume, released in Japan by Kadokawa Shoten on November 13, 1997

The chapters of the manga series D.N.Angel are written and illustrated by Yukiru Sugisaki. The first chapter premiered in Japan in the November 1997 issue of Monthly Asuka. New chapters were serialized in the magazine monthly until August 2005, when Sugisaki put the series on an extended hiatus. It eventually returned to serialization, starting in the April 2008 issue of Monthly Asuka. The series focuses on Daisuke Niwa, a middle school student who transforms into the phantom thief Dark Mousy whenever he thinks about his crush, Risa Harada.

The individual chapters are collected and published in tankōbon volumes by Kadokawa Shoten. The first volume was released on November 13, 1997; a total of 20 volumes have been released, the last five in e-book format only. A limited tankōbon edition was offered as a bonus in Gekkan Asuka's May 2019 release, published on March 23.

Gekkan Asuka has announced on February 23, 2019, that a kanzenban edition would compile in 2020 all DNAngel volumes into 10 books.

The series was previously licensed for an English-language release in North America by Tokyopop, which released the first volume of the series in April 2004. On November 8, 2005, Tokyopop released a box set containing the first two volumes of the series. However, Tokyopop announced that its North American division would close on May 31, 2011, leaving the fate of the manga's localization in question. In 2014, Viz Media picked up the digital publication rights to Tokyopop's release for Kindle.

During their panel at Sakura-Con 2025, Yen Press announced that they had licensed the kanzenban edition volumes of the series for English publication.

In August 2003, while the primary series was on hiatus, a second manga series, D.N.Angel TV Animation Series began serialization in Monthly Asuka. Also written by Sugisaki, the short series was based on the anime adaptation, which had diverged from the storyline of the manga series. D.N.Angel TV Animation Series finished its serialization in the October 2003 issue. It was published in 5 tankōbon volumes by Kadokawa Shoten.

== Volume list ==
=== Original edition ===
No.	Original release date	Original ISBN	North America release date	North America ISBN
1	November 13, 1997	978-4-04-924701-5	April 6, 2004	978-1-59182-799-3
Chapter 1: "Warning of Trouble (and Romance)"; Chapter 2: "Warning of a Level Up (and Illusions)"; Chapter 3: "Second Warning (of a Fallen Angel)"; "'N' is for Nishiki"; "Afterword"
2	December 14, 1998	978-4-04-924761-9	June 8, 2004	978-1-59182-800-6
Chapter 4: "Warning about Dark (and his DNA)"; Chapter 5: "Warning about Risa"; Chapter 6: "Warning of a Big Gamble (and a Skyscraper)"; "Bonus Story: The Demon Returns"
3	August 19, 1999	978-4-04-924789-3	August 3, 2004	978-1-59182-801-3
"D.N.Angel Character Guide"; Chapter 7: "Warning on St. White's Day (Part 1)"; Chapter 7: "Warning on St. White's Day (Part 2)"; Chapter 8: "Warning about Wings"; Chapter 9: "Warning about a Mask"; "One Night Magic #1"; "One Night Magic #2"; "One Night Magic #3"; "One Night Magic #4"; "Character Popularity Contest Results!"
4	July 17, 2000	978-4-04-924827-2	October 5, 2005	978-1-59182-802-0
Bonus Chapter: "Warning about Glass (and Menou)"; "Stage 2, Part 1"; "Stage 2, Part 2"; Bonus Chapter: "Warning about a Smile"; "Protecting the Kanno House"; "One Night Magic #5"; "One Night Magic #6"; "One Night Magic #7"; "One Night Magic #4!"
5	February 17, 2001	978-4-04-924851-7	December 7, 2004	978-1-59182-803-7
"Stage 2, Part 3"; "Stage 2, Part 4"; "Stage 2, Part 5"; "Stage 2, Part 6"; "Stage 2, Part 7"; "Stage 2, Part 8"
6	January 17, 2002	978-4-04-924887-6	February 8, 2005	978-1-59182-955-3
"Stage 2, Part 9"; "Stage 2, Part 10"; "Stage 2, Part 11"; "Special Bonus Chapter: Riku and Risa"; "The Second Hand of Time, Part 1"; "The Second Hand of Time, Part 2"
7	October 17, 2002	978-4-04-924917-0	April 12, 2005	978-1-59182-956-0
"The Second Hand of Time, Part 3"; "The Second Hand of Time, Part 4"; "The Second Hand of Time, Part 5"; "The Second Hand of Time, Part 6"; "Boys' and Girls' Mini-Manga"; "One Night Magic Fan Art Gallery"; "DNAngel Illustration Gallery"
8	March 17, 2003	978-4-04-924940-8	June 7, 2005	978-1-59182-957-7
"The Second Hand of Time, Part 7"; "The Second Hand of Time, Part 8"; "The Second Hand of Time, Part 9"; "The Second Hand of Time, Part 10"
9	July 17, 2003	978-4-04-924945-3	September 13, 2005	978-1-59532-794-9
"The Second Hand of Time, Part 11"; "Stage 3, Part 1"; "Stage 3, Part 2"; "Stage 3, Part 3"; "Stage 3, Part 4"
10	February 17, 2004	978-4-04-924962-0	December 13, 2005	978-1-59532-795-6
"Stage 3, Part 5"; "Stage 3, Part 6"; "Stage 3, Part 7"; "Stage 3, Part 8"; "Stage 3, Part 9"; "Stage 3, Part 10"; "Stage 3, Part 11"
11	August 10, 2005	978-4-04-925010-7	September 13, 2006	978-1-59816-810-5
"Stage 3, Part 12"; "Stage 3, Part 13"; "Stage 3, Part 14"; "Stage 3, Part 15"; "Stage 3, Part 16"; "Stage 3, Part 17"; "Short Story 1"; "Short Story 2"; "Short Story 3"
12	June 17, 2008	978-4-04-925060-2	August 1, 2009	978-1-4278-1593-4
"Stage 3, Part 18"; "Stage 3, Part 19"
13	October 17, 2008	978-4-04-925063-3	December 8, 2009	978-1-4278-1626-9
"Stage 3, Part 20"; "Stage 3, Part 21"; "Stage 3, Part 22"; "Stage 3, Part 23"
14	September 24, 2010	978-4-04-925074-9	cancelled	978-3-551-78244-1
"Argentine special"; "Stage 4, Part 1"; "Stage 4, Part 2"; "Stage 4, Part 3"; "Stage 4, Part 4"; "Stage 4, Part 5"; "Stage 4, Part 6"
15	January 24, 2011	978-4-04-925076-3	—	—
"Stage 4, Part 7"; "Stage 4, Part 8"; "Stage 4, Part 9"; "Stage 4, Part 10"; "Stage 4, Part 11"; "Stage 4, Part 12"
16	January 24, 2019	—	—	—
"Stage 4, Part 13"; "Stage 4, Part 14"; "Stage 4, Part 15"; "Stage 4, Part 16"; "Stage 4, Part 17"
17	July 24, 2019	—	—	—
"Stage 4, Part 18"; "Stage 4, Part 19"; "Stage 4, Part 20"; "Stage 4, Part 21"; "Stage 4, Part 22"; "Stage 4, Part 23"; "Stage 4, Part 24"
18	March 24, 2020	—	—	—
"Stage 4, Part 25"; "Stage 4, Part 26"; "Stage 4, Part 27"; "Stage 4, Part 28"; "Stage 4, Part 29"; "Stage 4, Part 30"
19	June 24, 2021	—	—	—
"Stage 4, Part 31"; "Stage 4, Part 32"; "Stage 4, Part 33"; "Stage 4, Part 34"; "Stage 4, Part 35"; "Stage 4, Part 36"; "Stage 4, Part 37"; "Stage 4, Part 38"
20	June 24, 2021	—	—	—
"Stage 4, Part 39"; "Stage 4, Part 40"; "Stage 4, Part 41"; "Stage 4, Part 42"; "Stage 4, Part 43"; "Stage 4, Part 44"; "Stage 4, Part 45"

=== New edition ===
No.	Original release date	Original ISBN	North America release date	North America ISBN
1	January 22, 2021	978-4-04-108065-8	October 28, 2025	979-8-8554-1995-5
2	January 22, 2021	978-4-04-108064-1	February 24, 2026	979-8-8554-1997-9
3	February 22, 2021	978-4-04-108066-5	July 28, 2026	979-8-8554-1999-3
4	February 22, 2021	978-4-04-108067-2	November 24, 2026	979-8-8554-2001-2
5	March 24, 2021	978-4-04-108068-9	April 27, 2027	979-8-8554-2003-6
6	March 24, 2021	978-4-04-108069-6	—	—
7	April 24, 2021	978-4-04-108070-2	—	—
8	April 24, 2021	978-4-04-108071-9	—	—
9	May 24, 2021	978-4-04-108072-6	—	—
10	May 24, 2021	978-4-04-108073-3	—	—

=== DDNAngels ===
No.	Original release date	Original ISBN	North America release date	North America ISBN
1	November 21, 2025	978-4-04-116885-1	—	—

== See also ==
- List of D.N.Angel characters
- List of D.N.Angel episodes
