= Byakuya =

Byakuya (written: 白夜 lit. "white night", "short night", or "night under the midnight sun") may refer to:

- Byakuya (gelato), a Japanese expensive gelato
- Byakuya (True Light), a song by Shunichi Miyamoto
- Four Nights of a Dreamer, a 1971 French film directed by Robert Bresson, released in Japan as Byakuya
- Byakuya, an Under Night In-Birth character

== Fictional characters ==
- Byakuya (InuYasha), a character in the anime and manga series InuYasha
- Byakuya Kuchiki, a character in the anime and manga series Bleach
- Byakuya Togami, a character in the visual novel and anime series Danganronpa
- Byakuya, a character in the light novel and anime series Kakuriyo no Yadomeshi
- Byakuya Matō, a character in the light visual and anime Fate/Zero
- Byakuya Jougasaki, a character in the light novel series Chivalry of a Failed Knight
- Byakuya Ishigami, a character in the manga and anime series Dr. Stone
- Byakuya Mimori, a character in the manga and anime series The Magical Girl and the Evil Lieutenant Used to Be Archenemies
