= List of The Candidate for Goddess chapters =

Japanese Manga Series

The Candidate for Goddess is a manga series created by Yukiru Sugisaki. Taking place in the year 4084, the plot centers around Zero Enna, a candidate for piloting the massive mechanized weapons called "Ingrids" (or "Goddesses"), humanity's only defense against extraterrestrial beings known as "Victim".

The Candidate for Goddess was originally serialized in Comic Gum, a monthly Japanese manga magazine published by Wani Books. The 26 chapters that comprise the series were compiled into five tankōbon (volumes) and released between August 1997 and November 2001. All five volumes of the series were re-published in 2005 as part of the "Gum Comics Plus" imprint. Tokyopop acquired the series in early 2003 for an English distribution in North America. The series was adapted by Marv Wolfman and published between April 14 and December 7, 2004.

== Volume list ==
No.	Original release date	Original ISBN	English release date	English ISBN
1	October 1997	978-4-84-703254-7	April 13, 2004	1-59182-747-7
00. "Zero"; 01. "Chance"; 02. "If"; 03. "Here I Am"; 04. "Battle"; 0X. "H_{2}Oplanet"
2	July 1998	978-4-84-703288-2	June 15, 2004	1-59182-748-5
05. "No.88"; 06. "Weak Point"; 07. "Heaven Knows"; 08. "There's No Limit"; 09. "Alive"
3	May 1999	978-4-84-703312-4	August 3, 2004	1-59182-749-3
10. "Z-M"; 11. "Fly"; 12. "What Do You Dream?"; 13. "Warning Coloration"; 14. "In Life, In Death"
4	February 2000	978-4-84-703338-4	October 12, 2004	1-59182-750-7
15. "Gunning Down"; 16. "Unknown"; 17. "To The Water"; 18. "Final Farewell"; 19. "My Dear Old Home..."
5	November 2001	978-4-84-703421-3	December 7, 2004	1-59182-751-5
20. "Good Luck"; 21. "Requiem"; 22. "Just Condition"; 23. "Omen"; 24. "Decoy"; 25. "I'll Remember Forever. "
