= Kevin Corn =

American actor

- Occupation: Voice actor
- Years active: 2001–05

Kevin Corn is an American former voice actor who voiced characters in anime for ADV Films. Some of his major roles include Daisuke Niwa the title character in D.N. Angel, Kotaro Kobayashi in Angelic Layer, Colonel MacDougall in Spriggan and Kouryu in Saiyuki.

== Personal life ==
After 2005, he relocated to Nashville, Tennessee. He is currently a cancer researcher and chemical/bio-molecular engineering PhD student at Vanderbilt University.

== Anime filmography ==
List of voice performances in anime
| Year | Title | Role | Notes | Refs |
|---|---|---|---|---|
| 2001 | Orphen | Young Orphen, others | | |
| 2001 | Spriggan | Colonel MacDougall | | |
| 2001 | Princess Nine | Young Hiroki, Boy, Young Sakurai | | |
| 2002 | Chance Pop Session | Boy 1 | | |
| 2003 | Noir | Henri | | |
| 2003 | Neo Ranga | Joel, others | | |
| 2003 | RahXephon | Young Makoto | | |
| 2003 | Rune Soldier | Odessa's Sibling, Child | | |
| 2003 | Saiyuki | Kid, Puppet, Kouryuu | | |
| 2003 | Angelic Layer | Kotaro Kobayashi | | |
| 2003 | Legend of the Mystical Ninja | Noboru Mejirodai | | |
| 2004 | Conduct Zero | Anime Porn Customer 1 | live-action dub | |
| 2004 | Megazone 23: Part 3 | Akira, others | OVA | |
| 2004 | Peacemaker | Suzu Kitamura | | |
| 2004 | D.N.Angel | Daisuke Niwa | | |
| 2005 | Full Metal Panic? Fumoffu | Masatami Hyuga | | |
