= Daiki Niwa =

Daiki Niwa may refer to:

- Daiki Niwa (D.N.Angel), a character in the manga series D.N.Angel
- Daiki Niwa (footballer) (born 1986), Japanese footballer
