= Taeko Kawata =

Japanese voice actress (born 1965)

- 川田 妙子
- Born: March 20, 1965 (age 61); Tokyo, Japan
- Other name: Taeko Yamada
- Education: Jissen Commercial High School
- Occupation: Voice actress
- Years active: 1986–present
- Height: 155 cm (5 ft 1 in)
- Website: Fan Fun Garden

Taeko Kawata (川田 妙子, Kawata Taeko; born March 20, 1965) is a Japanese voice actress best known for voicing Amy Rose from the Sonic the Hedgehog franchise. Her former stage name is Taeko Yamada (山田 妙子, Yamada Taeko). After graduating from Jissen Commercial High School, she worked at 81 Produce until 2010. On October 1, 2019, she announced the formation of a private firm, T-River LLC, and the opening of a private school at the same time.

== Filmography ==
=== Television animation ===
1990s

- Chibi Maruko-chan (1990) (Toshiko Tsuchihashi)
- Sailor Moon R (Momoko Momohara, Mie Sayama)
- Battle Athletes (1997) (Ling-Pha Wong)
- Dr. Slump (1997) (Arale Norimaki, Mame Soramame)

2000s

- Sonic X (2003) (Amy Rose)
- Futari wa Pretty Cure Max Heart (2005) (Nozomi)
- Futari wa Pretty Cure Splash Star (2006) (Queen Filia)
- HeartCatch PreCure! (2010) (Chypre)

2016

- JoJo's Bizarre Adventure: Diamond Is Unbreakable (2016) (Invisible Baby/Shizuka Joestar)

Unknown date

- Azuki-chan (Kaoru Nishino)
- Bomberman B-Daman Bakugaiden V (Megamibon)
- Bleach (Miyuki)
- Bubu Chacha (Mary)
- Cardcaptor Sakura (Yuuki Tachibana)
- Casshern Sins (Niko)
- Cosmic Baton Girl Comet-san (Rababou)
- D.Gray-man (Level 4 Akuma)
- D.N.Angel (Mio Hio, Emiko Niwa (younger version))
- Futari wa Pretty Cure Splash Star (Queen Filia)
- Hamtaro (Yume-chan, Mineko-chan)
- Hatara Kizzu Maihamu Gumi (Marina Nikaidō)
- Konjiki no Gash Bell!! (Rushka)
- A Little Snow Fairy Sugar (Kanon)
- One Piece (Milia)
- Pita-Ten (Shino)
- Pretty Cure All Stars DX2 (Chypre)
- Pretty Cure All Stars DX3 (Chypre)
- Princess Nine (Nene Mori)
- R.O.D the TV (Hisami Hishishii)
- Sailor Moon series (1992-1997) (Momoko Momohara)
- Seraphim Call (Tanpopo Teramoto)
- Strange+ (Dorothy)
- Sunset on Third Street (Michiko Ohkido (Micchan))
- Wolf's Rain (Neige)
- Cinnamon the Movie (Cinnamoroll/Cinnamon)

=== OVA ===
- Here Is Greenwood (1991-1993) (Reina Kisaragi)
- Ojamajo Doremi Na-i-sho (2004) (Nozomi Waku)
- Tales of Phantasia: The Animation (2004-2006) (Suzu Fujibayashi)
- Find the Four-Leaf Crimson Clover! (2003) (Kaede Yoshino)

=== Video games ===
- Crash Team Racing (Pura)
- Mario & Sonic at the London 2012 Olympic Games (Amy Rose)
- Mario & Sonic at the Olympic Games (Amy Rose)
- Mario & Sonic at the Olympic Games Tokyo 2020 (Amy Rose)
- Mario & Sonic at the Olympic Winter Games (Amy Rose)
- Mario & Sonic at the Rio 2016 Olympic Games (Amy Rose)
- Mario & Sonic at the Sochi 2014 Olympic Winter Games (Amy Rose)
- Refrain Love 2 (Akane Misawa)
- Shadow the Hedgehog (Amy Rose)
- Sonic Advance 3 (Amy Rose)
- Sonic Adventure (Amy Rose)
- Sonic Adventure 2 (Amy Rose)
- Sonic & All-Stars Racing Transformed (Amy Rose)
- Sonic the Hedgehog series (Amy Rose)
- Sonic and the Black Knight (Amy Rose)
- Sonic and the Secret Rings (Amy Rose)
- Sonic Battle (Amy Rose)
- Sonic Boom: Rise of Lyric (Amy Rose)
- Sonic Boom: Shattered Crystal (Amy Rose)
- Sonic Colors (Amy Rose)
- Sonic Free Riders (Amy Rose)
- Sonic Frontiers (Amy Rose)
- Sonic Generations (Amy Rose)
- Sonic the Hedgehog (2006) (Amy Rose)
- Sonic Heroes (Amy Rose)
- Sonic Lost World (Amy Rose)
- Sonic Riders (Amy Rose)
- Sonic Riders: Zero Gravity (Amy Rose)
- Sonic Unleashed (Amy Rose)
- Tales of Phantasia (Suzu Fujibayashi)
- Tales of the World: Radiant Mythology 2 (Suzu Fujibayashi)
- Tales of the World: Radiant Mythology 3 (Suzu Fujibayashi)
- Tales of Phantasia: Narikiri Dungeon X (Suzu Fujibayashi)
- Team Sonic Racing (Amy Rose)
- Tokyo Mew Mew (PlayStation game) (Ringo Akai)

=== Dubbing ===
==== Live-action ====
- 3 Ninjas: High Noon at Mega Mountain (Michael "Tum Tum" Douglas) (James Paul Roeske II)
- Aliens (1992 VHS/DVD edition) (Rebecca "Newt" Jorden) (Carrie Henn)
- Annie: A Royal Adventure! (Hannah) (Emily Ann Lloyd)
- Babel (Debbie Jones) (Elle Fanning)
- Beethoven (Emily Newton) (Sarah Rose Karr)
- Beethoven's 2nd (Emily Newton) (Sarah Rose Karr)
- Edges of the Lord (Tolo) (Liam Hess)
- Enough (Gracie Hiller) (Tessa Allen)
- ER (Rachel Greene (Yvonne Zima), Mei-Sun (Lucy Liu))
- Falling Down (1997 TV Asahi edition) (Adele Trevino (Joey Hope Singer))
- Full House (Michelle Elizabeth Tanner) (Mary-Kate Olsen, Ashley Olsen))
- Hope Floats (Bernice Pruitt (Mae Whitman))
- Lemony Snicket's A Series of Unfortunate Events (Sunny Baudelaire)
- The Long Kiss Goodnight (Caitlin (Yvonne Zima))
- Look Who's Talking Now (Julie Ubriacco (Tabitha Lupien))
- My Life Without Me (Patsy (Kenya Jo Kennedy))
- Poltergeist film trilogy (Carol Anne Freeling) (Heather O'Rourke)
- Resident Evil: Extinction (White Queen (Madeline Carroll))
- Sudden Death (1999 TV Asahi edition) (Emily McCord (Whittni Wright))
- Two of a Kind (Ashley Burke (Ashley Olsen))
- Village of the Damned (1998 TV Asahi edition) (David McGowan (Thomas Dekker))
- Waterworld (Enola) (Tina Majorino)

==== Animation ====
- Babar (TV series) (Flora)
- My Little Pony: Equestria Girls (Sweetie Belle)
- My Little Pony: Friendship Is Magic (Sweetie Belle)
- The Oz Kids (Boris)
- The Simpsons (Maggie Simpson) (Elizabeth Taylor)

=== Other ===
- Hoshi no Kirby Talking CD Comic (1994) (Kirby)
- Sanrio character ("Cinnamoroll") (Cinnamoroll/Cinnamon)
