= The Candidate for Goddess =

Manga written and illustrated by Yukiru Sugisaki

- Cover of The Candidate for Goddess volume 1 as published by Tokyopop

女神候補生 (Megami Kōhosei)
- Genre: Action, Space Opera, Mecha, Sci-Fi
- Manga
- Written by: Yukiru Sugisaki
- Published by: Wani Books
- English publisher: AUS: Madman Entertainment; NA: Tokyopop
- Magazine: Comic Gum
- Original run: 1997 – 2001
- Volumes: 5
- Anime television series

Pilot Candidate
- Directed by: Mitsuru Hongo
- Music by: Tomoyuki Asakawa
- Studio: Xebec
- Licensed by: NA: Discotek Media
- Original network: NHK BS2, Animax
- English network: SEA: Animax Asia; US: Adult Swim
- Original run: January 10, 2000 – March 27, 2000
- Episodes: 12
- Original video animation

Special Curriculum: The Candidate for Goddess
- Directed by: Shinichi Yamaoka
- Music by: Tomoyuki Asakawa
- Studio: Xebec
- Licensed by: NA: Discotek Media
- Released: May 25, 2002
- Runtime: 23 minutes

The Candidate for Goddess (Japanese: 女神候補生, Hepburn: Megami Kōhosei; lit. "Goddess Cadet") is a Japanese manga written and illustrated by Yukiru Sugisaki. The series takes place in the distant future, where human beings live among space colonies and a single, inhabitable planet called Zion. The plot follows Zero Enna and his fellow candidates as they try to prove themselves worthy of piloting the "Ingrids", also called "Goddesses". These gigantic, humanoid weapons are humanity's only significant defense against a hostile, alien threat known as "Victim".

The Candidate for Goddess was serialized in the monthly Wani Books magazine Comic Gum. A total of 26 chapters were collected in five tankōbon (volumes) and released between 1997 and 2001. The manga was later translated into English and published in North America by Tokyopop and in Australian and New Zealand by Madman Entertainment. The Candidate for Goddess was adapted into a 12-episode anime series directed by Mitsuru Hongo and produced by Xebec, which was a subsidiary of Production I.G. The adaptation aired on Japan's NHK BS2 satellite channel in early 2000. The anime series, entitled Pilot Candidate for its North American release, was broadcast briefly on Cartoon Network's Adult Swim block in 2002. An original video animation (OVA), serving as a thirteenth episode, was released in Japan in 2002, though it was not localized for North America until 2016, when Discotek Media acquired the license to the series.

Since the debut of The Candidate for Goddess on Japanese television, a limited number of CDs and artbook illustrations for the series have been released. Overall reception for The Candidate for Goddess has been mediocre. Though its animation has been generally praised, its complex plot, compounded by its very short length, has been met with mixed criticism. Reviewers were dismayed by the lack of storyline closure at the end of the television episodes and even its OVA extension.

== Plot ==
The Candidate for Goddess series takes place a millennium after Star Year 4084, when a cataclysmic event called the "Crisis of Systems" resulted in the annihilation of four planetary systems. With Zion being the one planet left with the ability to sustain human life, humanity must cling to life in space colonies. Now in Star Year 5030, Zion is under constant threat of invasion by extraterrestrial life forms dubbed "Victim" (犠牲者, Giseisha). In order to combat their alien foes, humans have developed a quintet of giant, mechanized weapons called "Ingrids", or "Goddesses" due to their female, humanoid resemblance. A school called the "Goddess Operation Academy (G.O.A.)" is established to train the specific few which have the capability of piloting the Ingrids. They are typically young men and must meet several requirements: They must be in good health, must be 14 to 16 years of age, must have an EO blood type, and must possess the potential for "EX", superhuman abilities which secondarily link the pilot's nerves to the Ingrid's interface. As EX puts such a physical and mental strain on the pilot, replacements must be turned out by the G.O.A. within a reasonable amount of time. Each pilot is also partnered with a female repairer, who maintains the Ingrid and manually blocks painful feedback from the Ingrid to the pilot during missions.

The plot of The Candidate for Goddess primarily focuses on Zero Enna, a brash trainee who has recently left colony homelife with his mother in order to pursue his dream of becoming an Ingrid pilot. Shortly after arriving at the G.O.A., Zero becomes lost and is subconsciously called to a hangar by a mysterious voice, suddenly finding himself within the cockpit of one of the Ingrids just before a Victim attack. As each Ingrid is specifically calibrated for their pilot, this would normally mean death. However, the Goddess instead links with Zero's nervous system and physically shows itself to him in a vision. After a few moments, the Ingrid ends the link with Zero, and he is pulled free by the Ingrid's pilot, who then takes it into battle with the Victim. Zero is rushed unconscious to the academy's sick bay.

== Production ==
The original manga version of The Candidate for Goddess was written and illustrated by Yukiru Sugisaki. An anime television adaptation of The Candidate for Goddess was produced by Xebec, a subsidiary studio of Production I.G., and directed by Mitsuru Hongo. Shinichi Yamaoka was the show's character designer, having also worked on Martian Successor Nadesico. Shingo Takeba and Junya Ishigaki acted as its main mecha designers, respectively credited for the anime series Gasaraki and the video game Xenogears. The musical score for The Candidate for Goddess was created by Tomoyuki Asakawa, who previously composed for the television series The New Adventures of Kimba The White Lion and the film The Five Star Stories.

Hongo attempted to adapt the manga closely while integrating interesting story elements and 3D CGI animation, used in the battles between the Ingrids and Victim alongside the traditional cel animation. Hongo felt the possibilities with the CGI were limitless; 3D director Tokumitsu Kifune did not think these portions of the show would not have been possible with 2D animation. The manga series was still ongoing at the time of the anime's creation. With only 12 television episodes produced, Xebec ended the series abruptly without giving the storyline closure. Although a thirteenth episode in the form of an OVA continues where the television series left off, it still fails to conclude the narrative. Hongo has expressed regret over the short length of the series.

== Media ==
=== Manga ===
The Candidate for Goddess was originally serialized in Comic Gum, a monthly Japanese manga magazine published by Wani Books. The 26 chapters that comprise the series were compiled into five tankōbon (volumes) and released between August 1997 and November 2001. All five volumes of the series were re-published in 2005 as part of the "Gum Comics Plus" imprint. Tokyopop acquired the series in early 2003 for an English distribution in North America. All five volumes were published between April 14 and December 7, 2004. The series was translated by Alethea and Athena Nibley and adapted by comic book writer Marv Wolfman. The series has also been published in South Korea by Samyang Publishing, in France by Ki-oon, in Germany by Carlsen Comics and in Spain by Editorial Ivréa.

=== Anime ===
Twelve episodes of The Candidate for Goddess, beginning with "Curriculum 00" and ending with "Curriculum 11", were aired on Japan's NHK BS2 satellite channel from January 10 to March 27, 2000. Video Maker released the series on four DVD volumes from April 25 to July 25, 2000. The thirteenth episode was released straight to DVD as an OVA in Japan on May 25, 2002, as Special Curriculum: The Candidate for Goddess. A DVD box set titled Emotion the Best: The Candidate for Goddess was released by Video Maker in Japan on April 22, 2011, and includes all 12 episodes of the broadcast plus the OVA.

By early 2001, Bandai Entertainment acquired the North American distribution rights to The Candidate for Goddess with plans to air the series on Cartoon Network. An English dubtitle was completed by Mix Magic, Inc. in Hollywood, CA. According to Bandai's Jerry Chu, the series was renamed Pilot Candidate because the company wanted to veer away from the term "goddess" for Cartoon Network's sake and because they believed the new title was more descriptive of the series. The channel had originally intended to air the series on its popular afternoon anime block Toonami that fall, and had considered including a reversible cover or an alternate angle intro animation with the original title if fans requested it. However, the anime was delayed and ultimately premiered on its late night Saturday Adult Swim block on February 24, 2002. Despite being broadcast on the more mature list of programming, Pilot Candidate was censored, including the removal of nudity, violence, tobacco use, and religious references. This was likely due in part that it was originally intended for Toonami and the episodes were already completed with the intention of the demographic being children. Four DVDs containing the series were released in North American stores between November 1, 2001, and May 21, 2002. All twelve episodes of the series were released on the Pilot Candidate Complete Collection box set on October 11, 2005. On March 8, 2016, Discotek Media had announced their license to the series and the unreleased OVA to be released on June 28, 2016.

=== CDs ===
A 29-song soundtrack CD of the background and vocal music for The Candidate for Goddess was released by Victor Entertainment in Japan on March 23, 2000. A CD Single for "Chance" was also published on February 2, 2000. "The Night Before Departure: Get a Dream!" (発進前夜 ~Get a Dream!~), a CD single by the artist Universe Form, was released by Victor on January 21, 2000, shortly after the anime's debut. This CD also contains a preliminary drama track titled "Curriculum 0.5 Interview" (ドラマ カリキュラム0.5「面接」). The Candidate for Goddess Original Drama Album, released on July 26, 2000, features the Japanese voice actors portraying their respective characters in a drama.

=== Other merchandise ===
In April 2000, Wani Books published a Japanese paperback guidebook to the anime series titled The Candidate for Goddess Visual Book (女神候補生ビジュアルブック, Megami Kōhosei Visual Book), which contains promotional material, artwork cels, and staff interviews. In February 2002, Wani Books published The Candidate for Goddess Special Illustrations Box: Myth (女神候補生原画集スペシャルボックス「myth～神話～」, Megami Kōhosei Special Illustrations: Myth ~Myth~), a collector's set containing an artbook, an illustrations CD-ROM, and other collectables. Sugisaki's artbook, Neutral, showcases her illustrations for The Candidate for Goddess as well from her other manga works Brain Powerd and D.N.Angel. Bandai produced a single action figure set of Pilot Candidate as part of a toy line for its licensed properties. The set contains the characters Zero and Kizna and the Ingrid Ernn-Laties.

== Reception ==
Overall critical reception for The Candidate for Goddess has been average. Its primary high point for many reviewers has been the anime version's animation quality. Protoculture Addicts staff contributor Miyako Matsuda enjoyed both the traditional cel animation and the 3D CGI, stating that the two styles blended nicely together. Jeremy A. Beard of THEM Anime Reviews and Anime News Network (ANN) reviewer Daniel DeLorme were equally pleased by the character designs and hand-drawn portions of the show. However, Delorme felt the "primitive" look of the 3D mecha battles to be the biggest flaw of the series. Beard, who appreciated the Ingrid designs themselves, did not think the CGI conformed with the rest of the animation and that the space combat sequences were not "particularly fluid". Beard further enjoyed the background music and ending theme of the anime, but that its opening theme did not fit with the visuals or feeling of the series.

Opinions for the plot of The Candidate for Goddess have varied. DeLorme and Animerica columnist Benjamin Wright commented favorably on the show's pacing. Both writers proclaimed that although the anime initially seemed formulaic, it contained a generous amount of intricate mystery and character development. Wright summarized, "Zero's trials and tribulations, his friendships and rivalries, and the mysteries of the G.O.A., the Ingrids, EX, and Zero's own past all worm their way into the viewer's mind and heart." Adversely, Beard did not feel the anime adaptation well-utilized the anime storyline template of mysterious aliens, an academic setting, a last line of defense, and other related devices. Liann Cooper of ANN similarly found the manga version of The Candidate for Goddess to suffer from "a bad case of the 'been there done that' syndrome" with regard to its plot and characters. Cooper additionally noted sloppy artwork, messy action scenes, and confusion when the narrative switches between the past and present. Beard admitted some "irritation regarding unnecessary internal plot inconsistencies", such as the characters constantly voicing the importance of having only male pilots despite the most elite pilot being female, or having no explanation for Kizna being the only catgirl among all the humans.

A common complaint by the press is that the anime adaptation of The Candidate for Goddess ends on a cliffhanger. Wright and DeLorme were anxious for more of the television series after the build-up of several intriguing and unresolved plot elements and a "to be continued" message at its conclusion. "Effective though Pilot Candidate is," Wright stated, "there's little satisfaction to be had in the end." Having criticized the incomplete storyline of the television episodes itself, Beard was heavily disappointed in the apparent continuation in the form of the single OVA episode, which he found did little to tie up the numerous, loose plot ends present at its close. The Candidate for Goddess has yet to recommence. AnimeNation journalist John Oppliger has attributed the deficient interest in continuing the anime, beyond its delayed OVA, to the mediocre ratings it received during its original Japanese broadcast.
