= Lagoon Engine =

Japanese manga series

- Cover of Lagoon Engine Einsatz volume 1 as published by A.D. Vision

ラグーンエンジン (Ragūn Enjin)
- Manga
- Written by: Yukiru Sugisaki
- Published by: Kadokawa Shoten
- English publisher: NA: Tokyopop (former) Viz Media
- Magazine: Monthly Asuka
- Original run: 2002 – 2007
- Volumes: 7
- Manga

Lagoon Engine Einsatz
- Written by: Yukiru Sugisaki
- Published by: Kadokawa Shoten
- English publisher: NA: ADV Manga
- Magazine: Monthly Asuka
- English magazine: Newtype USA
- Original run: October 2004 – ?
- Volumes: 1

Lagoon Engine (Japanese: ラグーンエンジン, Hepburn: Ragūn Enjin) is a manga by Yukiru Sugisaki. It was followed by Lagoon Engine Einsatz.

The main protagonists are Yen and Jin Ragun. The name "Lagoon Engine" is derived from the phonetic pronunciation of the main characters' names (Ragun Yen Jin).

Volume 6 was released on December 1, 2009. Volume 7 was released in September 2010 in the US.

== Plot ==
Lagoon Engine revolves around two characters: 12-year-old Yen, and 11-year-old Jin. While Yen's intelligent, calm, and thinks tactically, Jin's hotheaded and rushes into battle.

The Ragun family is dedicated to defeating ghosts, evil spirits, etc. - known as 'Maga' Yen and Jin just happen to the successors of the family, and they have to fight Maga too. In short: Yen and Jin are Gakushi.

Both Yen and Jin have Maga - though not evil maga. Yen's Maga is called Koga, while Jin's maga is named Sora. Koga is good with gathering information, analyzing and remembering things, though he's extremely bad at attacking. Sora has no intellectual power whatsoever, but his attack power is very high.

== Characters ==
Yen Ragun (等軍焔)
Intelligent, and good with making inferences, as is Koga. A good gakushi and often teams up with Jin while fighting maga. As a perception type, he can understand Maga. As shown in the second book, he hates slimy things, so he hates natto (fermented soybeans). He enjoys swimming and he is in the 6th grade, the last grade of elementary.
Jin Ragun (等軍陣)
Yen's younger brother. Almost the complete opposite. Hotheaded and rash - seemingly not very bright either. However, he's still loyal to his brother, and loves him very much. He's never quiet and hates peppers. He is just one grade behind Yen as well as age. He calls his brother "Yen-nii".
Ayato Housui (峰水綾人)
Ayato is related to Yen and Jin. Apparently, he's their cousin. He knows of Yen and Jin being Gakushi, and isn't bothered by it at all. He's quiet and polite. His nickname is "Aya". Yen almost thought he was a girl after forgetting what happened when he first encountered him in his house.
Miki Kirishima
Miki is a girl in Yen's class who has not attended school for two years because of a deadly disease that confines her to a hospital. Her dead dog, Tom, was led back to her by Yen and Jin, and is slowly becoming a maga. Yen thinks she'll become a Gakushi.
Erei Moribayashi
A friend of the Raguns. Loud, and rather hotheaded. She doesn't seem to know of the Raguns being Gakushi. She's taken a liking to Ayato.
Shintaro Nagasaku
28, single, and works as an editor for Yen and Jin's mother. He seems to live at the household, and is rather strange. In fact, he likes to wear skirts. But he is very superior when someone is in need of help.
Akane Ragun (Mari)
Akane is a very popular author. Her works never meet the deadline, but the books still end up being ridiculously popular. Although her true name is 'Akane Ragun', her penname is 'Akane Mari'. She's the mother of Yen and Jin.
Hideaki Ragun
Hideaki is the husband of Akane Mari and the father of the Raguns. He's a very experienced Gakushi, and extremely powerful.
Suguru Mikami
Suguru is a gakushi of the Mikami. The Mikami is a 'branch' of the Ragun. He appears to be the silent type at first - strong, cool and collective - but that's not all that there is to him. He hates being called "Branch Family" and Jin for calling him that. Besides that, it's very possible for Suguru to be nerve-wracked.
Koga (Maga)
Yen's maga companion. Koga cares for Yen very much, and reflects on Yen: Koga is intelligent, and makes a good team with Sora - Jin's maga. However, Koga lacks in attacking.
Sora (Maga)
Jin's maga, and also seems to have as much energy as Jin. Sora has no intellectual power whatsoever, but his attack power is very high.
Shinno Zai
Shinno is assumed to be a Kamen Kugutsushi, which is the enemy of the Gakushi. He attends the same school as Ayato, but Ayato has no idea that Shinno's Yen and Jin's enemy. Not much is known about Shinno.
Hodou
Hodou is Shinno's servant. He calls him master and does his bidding. He attends the same school as Ayato as well. Not much is known about Hodou, either.

== Volume list ==
No.	Original release date	Original ISBN	English release date	English ISBN
1	—	—	—	978-1-59532-359-0
Chapters 1–5; Lagoon Engine Fan Art Collection
2	—	—	—	978-1-59532-603-4
Summary & Character Introduction; Chapters 6–9; Extra Chapter; Lagoon Engine Glossary of Terms
3	—	—		
4	—	—		
5	—	—		
6	—	—		
7	—	—		

== Lagoon Engine Einsatz ==
Lagoon Engine Einsatz (ラグーンエンジン アインザッツ, Ragūn Enjin Ainzattsu; romanized as Lagūnenjin Einsatz in Japan) is a Japanese manga series written and illustrated by Yukiru Sugisaki that has appeared in Newtype USA since October 2004. In July 2005 an announcement was made that ADV Manga would be distributing the series as graphic novels starting November that year; one volume was released. It has been suggested that this series is related in some way to the manga series Lagoon Engine by the same author, but no official statement has been made by the author or publishers to support this idea.

=== Plot ===
Scan from Newtype USA

Daisuke Kataoka writes of the series,

An unknown world in the distant past... The people of this ancient world once prospered in the warm embrace of the gods, but they forgot those who blessed them and filled their hearts with greed. Their vulgar hubris made a mockery of the gods, forcing them from their place in the heavens. Now, the gods are no longer kind. Raining death and destruction upon the people, these fallen deities threaten to consume the world...

=== Characters ===
- Sakis Snow Herzgil Lagoonaria - Sakis is a 13-year-old girl, a Scion, and Conductor of the Sky Knights. As a Lagoonarian, she is capable of choosing which gender she will become and like all Scions, she has the "flames of the gods" running in her veins. Sakis intends to become a male and take the role of King over Lagoonaria after her father.
- Cloche Herzgil Lagoonaria - Cloche is Sakis' older sister. Her duty is to become a woman and pass the flames of the gods, the blood of the royal family of Lagoonaria, onto the next generation.
- Zwau Herzgil Lagoonaria - Zwau, the father of Sakis and Cloche, is the dying king of Lagoonaria. He's been consumed by the flames of the gods that burn within all Scions. Although opposed to throwing his young daughter into such hardships, he will relinquish the throne to Sakis once she becomes a man. His death is only prolonged by the purifying waters that are constantly placed into his body.
- Voyse Granc Leiberk - Voyse is an oracle and the foremost magic user on the continent. He is very knowledgeable due to his high level of education and serves as a trainer and attendant to the Scion. He usually accompanies Sakis on outings, offering assistance and counsel as needed.
- Izar Neele - Izar is commander of the Sky Knights. He joined when he was around 16 or 17 and advanced to his current position by the age of 20. He is somewhat unsociable but very impressive with a sword and is rumored to have instructed the young Sakis in swordplay.
- Dosh Skeitner - Dosh is an airman and appears to be the oldest of the Sky Knights. He also seems to have known the commander the longest and is Izar's right-hand man.
- Lugo Callias - Lugo is a helmsman and handles the ship's rudder with the skill of a top-class pilot. He is the newest member of the Sky Knights.
- Zwan Hausen - Zwan is an airship navigator and rumored to come from one of the oldest and respected families in Lagoonaria.
- Reitzog D. Quarz - As an assistant engineer, Reitzog is run ragged by the master engineer, he spends his days performing endless maintenance on the Skyships. It's said that he comes from an established family of airship technicians living outside of Lagoonaria.
