= Anges (album) =

Studio album by Shunichi Miyamoto
- Released: December 3, 2003
- Recorded: 2003
- Genre: J-pop
- Label: Victor Entertainment

Shunichi Miyamoto chronology
Anges (2003)	For Someone Needs Love (2005)

Anges (French: Angels) is the first mini-album of the Japanese singer Shunichi Miyamoto under Victor Entertainment. It was released on December 12, 2003. It includes the live versions of the song, Byakuya ~True Light~ and Caged Bird.

== Track listing ==
=== CD ===
1. The Way To Myself
2. Run Deeper!
3. 帰るべき場所 - (Kaerubeki Basho)
4. そばにいられるなら - (Soba Ni Irareru Nara; If I Can Stay Close To You (Close To You))
5. Never, So Far Away
6. Anges
7. そばにいられるなら（Starlight Version） - (Soba Ni Irareru Nara (Starlight Version); If I Can Stay Close To You (Close To You (Starlight Version))
8. Caged Bird（Live Version）
9. 白夜～True Light～（Live Version） - (Byakuya ~True Light~ (Live Version); White Night ~True Light~ (Live Version))

== Charts ==
Chart (2003)	Peak position
Japan Oricon Yearly Album Chart	120
