= Melody of Oblivion =

Manga

- Cover of the first manga volume

忘却の旋律 (Bōkyaku no Senritsu)
- Created by: Gainax, J.C. Staff and Kadokawa Shoten
- Manga
- Written by: Shinji Katakura
- Published by: Kadokawa Comics
- Magazine: Shōnen Ace
- Original run: 2002 – 2004
- Volumes: 6
- Anime television series
- Directed by: Hiroshi Nishikiori
- Written by: Yōji Enokido
- Music by: Hijiri Kuwano; Yoshikazu Suo
- Studio: J.C.Staff
- Licensed by: NA: Geneon Universal Entertainment
- Original network: TBS
- Original run: 6 April 2004 – 21 September 2004
- Episodes: 24

The Melody of Oblivion (忘却の旋律, Bōkyaku no Senritsu) is a Japanese manga series by Shinji Katakura. The series was published through Kadokawa Comics through Shōnen Ace between 2002 and 2004.

An anime television series adaptation produced by Gainax and animated by J.C.Staff aired between April 7, 2004, and September 21, 2004, on TBS. A Game Boy Advance game was published through Bandai for Japanese markets.

== Synopsis ==
Approximately a century ago, during the 20th century, humanity waged and lost a war against creatures called "Monsters", who were able to assume human form. Now, approximately a century later, humanity is aware of the Monsters' existence but not that there was ever a war, the latter of which was deliberately orchestrated by the Monsters. Humanity's only protectors against the Monsters are the Warriors of Melos, a group of warriors capable of seeing a seemingly mute young girl called "Melody", who appears at important times. These warriors are aided by devices called Aibar machines, futuristic modes of transportation capable of some level of sentience.

The series primarily follows Bocca, a teenager who chooses to become a Warrior of Melos and bring an end to the Monsters' tyranny.

== Characters ==
=== Humans ===
- Bocca Serenade (ボッカ・セレナーデ), Voiced by: Houko Kuwashima (Japanese); Ted Sroka (English)
- Sayoko Tsukinomori (月之森小夜子, Tsukinomori Sayoko), Voiced by: Masumi Asano (Japanese); Carrie Savage (English)
- Kurofune Ballad (黒船・バラード, Kurofune Baraado), :Voiced by: Mitsuru Miyamoto (Japanese); Patrick Seitz (English)
- Toune Requiem (遠音・レクイエム, Tōne Rekuiemu), Voiced by: Sanae Kobayashi (Japanese); Wendy Tomson (English)
- Koko Ninna-Nanna (ココ・ニンナナンナ, Koko Ninna-Nanna), Voiced by: Yukari Tamura (Japanese); Jennifer Sekiguchi (English)
- Saburou Musashino, AKA Tsunagi (武蔵野 三郎/ツナギ, Musashino Saburō/Tsunagi), Voiced by: Fumio Matsuoka (Japanese); William Frederick Knight (English)
- The Melody of Oblivion (忘却の旋律, Bōkyaku no Senritsu), Voiced by: Mamiko Noto (Japanese); Michelle Ruff (English)

=== Monsters ===
- Horu / Minotaur, Voiced by: Shotaro Morikubo (Japanese); Liam O'Brien (English)
- The Girl With Red Hair / Medusa, Voiced by: Rie Saitou (Japanese); Rachel Hirschfeld (English)
- Tamakorogashi / Hecate, Voiced by: Mami Kosuge (Japanese); Kirsten Potter (English)
- Pan, Voiced by: Megumi Akimoto (Japanese); Jessica D. Stone (English)
- Monster King Solomon III aka Solo, Voiced by: Tomo Saeki (Japanese); Kevin Hatcher (English)

=== Monster Union ===
- Midnight Hiyoko, Voiced by: Yuri Amano (Japanese); Erica Shaffer (English)
- Millionaire Beaver, Voiced by: Aya Hisakawa (Japanese); Karen Thompson (English)
- Wrench Monkey, Voiced by: Mitsuaki Madono (Japanese); Liam O'Brien (English)
- Global Wildcat, Voiced by: Ryotaro Okiayu (Japanese); Travis Willingham (English)
- Lucky Thoroughbred, Voiced by: Yasunori Matsumoto (Japanese); Sam Regal (English)
- Flying Bunny, Voiced by: Yuri Shiratori (Japanese); Elise Baughman (English)
- Electric Sheep, Voiced by: Yumiko Kobayashi (Japanese); Zarah Little (English)
- Discount Uribou, Voiced by: Toshino Takamori (Japanese); Kirsty Pape (English)
- Child Dragon, Voiced by: Ken Yamaguchi (Japanese); Doug Erholtz (English)

=== Aibar Machines ===
- Elan Vital (Pegasus Series), Voiced by: Hiro Shimono (Japanese); Dave Mallow (English)
- Sky Blue (Unicorn Series), Voiced by: Soichiro Hoshi (Japanese); Yuri Lowenthal (English)
- Kuron, Voiced by: Katsuhiro Harasawa (Japanese); Josh Phillips (English)
- Hikari, Voiced by: Issei Miyazaki (Japanese); Bryce Papenbrook (English)
- Nick, Voiced by: Daisuke Namikawa (Japanese); T. Axelrod (English)
- Mono 4, Voiced by: Chie Sato (Japanese); Jessica D. Stone (English)

== Media ==
=== Anime ===
On April 7, 2004, an anime adaptation of the manga began airing on TBS. Produced by Gainax and animated by J.C.Staff, the series ran for 24 episodes until September 21, 2004. The series was directed by Hiroshi Nishikiori and Atsushi Takeyama. The opening was "Will" by Lisa Komine and the ending son was "Tenohira no Hikari" (てのひらの光) by Minawo.

Geneon dubbed the series into English for American markets. Episodes were released via DVD between 2005 and 2006.

No. overall	No. in season	Title
1	1	"Meros Warrior"
Bocca Serenade is a high school student who wishes to become a warrior but cannot pass the required tests. He is encouraged by Elle, who promises a date if he passes a retest, but grows discouraged when he witnesses his parents bribing the teacher to ensure his success. He goes to his friend Tsunagi's shop, where he meets the warrior Kurofune Ballard. The episode ends with Kurofune battling a monster, Hor, who has just eaten a child.
2	2	"The Beginning of a Long School Break"
Bocca has become a Meros Warrior and is given an Aibar machine by Tsunagi, who later goes missing. Hor returns to the town and tries to eat Elle, however Bocca and Kurofune fight him off with the help of a pickpocket, Sayako. Kurofune leaves, warning Sayako not to follow him. Bocca and Sayako then say goodbye to Elle and drive off on Bocca's Aibar.
3	3	"White Night Cape"
Bocca and Sayako arrive in a town of eternal darkness. In the town, parents keep their children inside whenever the local lighthouse shines red, afraid that something will kill them.
4	4	"Monster Union"
Bocca finally learns that the robot creature he fought before was from the organization, Monster Union, who are humans who serve under the monsters, using the robot creatures as their weapons. Keiko Hamasaki, the sister of Kew, and the owner of the inn, remembers her past, and is reminded of why she joined the Monster Union. Later, the robot creature strikes again, and Bocca is faced with it again, giving Bocca a great surprise.
5	5	"The Voice Reaching Out to You"
Although knowing the problems of White Night Cape, Bocca continues to try to destroy the Monster Union robot creature. Everyone in the town knows of his intentions, and sends Bocca into jail. Sayako finds out that Kew knows about Keiko siding with the Monster Union, and saves Bocca from jail. Even with Sayako's warning, Bocca still calls for his Aiba-Machine and tries to save Kew from her sister's hands. The battle of Bocca vs. Midnight Fledgling begins.
6	6	"Pyramid Scheme Valley"
Bocca and Sayako continue to follow Kurofune and encounter a new town called "Pyraid Scheme Valley", where they face new battles.
7	7	"Meigen"
Bocca learns that the girl who had aimed her arrow at him is named Tone. And she appears to hate Melos Warriors. He also learns that the technique that she uses to drive the "working mouse away" is a Melos technique. However he notices that she has no stigmatic mark on her arm. On learning of Tone's return to the valley, Miri Kanaya becomes agitated and recalls back her earlier years, of how and why she joined the Monster Union. The relationships between her, Tone, Eichi Hikoyama and the blue-eyed boy are also revealed.
8	8	"The Fated Road Afar"
Eichi completes the mural on the dam's wall, he tells Tone that the rest will be left to them before he leaves. Miri under the orders of the Monster, rides her 'Rat Monster' for a final battle with Bocca. Bocca uses the "Crying Bow String" technique to defeat Miri. The Dam is destroyed to reveal Eichi's final work. When Tone and Bocca part their ways, it is revealed that the blue eyed boy is Tone's Aibar machine. Bocca also spots Tone's stigmatic mark on her thigh.
9	9	"Apeman Turn"
Bocca and Sayoko arrives at a huge industrial region. Sayoko befriends a strange girl by the name of Coco. Coco tells Sayoko that she is involved in a theatrical play nearby. Bocca and Sayoko later meet up with a guy who offers Bocca a job as a security guard. And while Bocca faces a team of saboteurs of the delivery truck that he is protecting, Sayoko is taken prisoner by the guy, who reveals himself to be a member of the Monster Union. Bocca's bow is damaged during battle, but his Aibar machine provides him a more stronger bow. As the battle goes on, the saboteurs which includes Coco, realizes who Bocca is and stops the battle. They show Bocca the contents in the truck and brings him to see someone he knows.
10	10	"Unicorn Series"
Bocca meets up with his old friend Tsunagi. Tsunagi tells to Bocca about the Space Fort named Mitranome, and about 'Engine One'. The team intends to destroy Engine One, but Bocca wants to save Sayoko first. The team then splits into two. Bocca, Coco and another team mate goes to save Sayoko. The rest sets off to destroy Engine One.
11	11	"A Song You Still Don't Know About"
Bocca and the team successfully saves Sayoko. Sayoko reveals to them that there are still people in Engine One. They decide to try to save them too. The Monster Union member is later defeated in battle, but reveals that the people aren't really 'humans' but have been turned into something better. Tsunagi, in his attempt to destroy Engine One from the control station, finds a recording of someone he knew and had thought betrayed him. The recording reveals some surprises. Bocca wants Tsunagi to leave the place with him before the whole place blows up, but Tsunagi insists on staying. The team leaves without Tsunagi, and Engine One blows up.
12	12	"Maze Island"
In Bocca and Sayoko continuing search for Kurofune, they find Kurofune's Aibar machine, "Jaguar of the Sun". The Aibar machine reveals to them that Kurofune is on a very strange island. They try to make their way to the island and end up in a cave with strange murals. Bocca then fights a Monster Union agent before proceeding towards the labyrinth.
13	13	"Kurofune"
In this labyrinth, where space and time can be curved or warped, Bocca is able to meet with the child sacrifice, Solo, as well as Kurofune. Bocca witnesses the battle between Horu and Kurofune that happened in the past. Horu was defeated but was able to survive by hiding in the labyrinth because of the warped time. Bocca parted ways with Kurofune and later got separated from Solo, so he wanders off by himself in the labyrinth. He encounters an adult Elle, who offers him a celebration if he will give her a lifeline. He refuses, stating that if he had chosen her he would never have begun his path as a Melos Warrier.
14	14	"The Entrance Called the Exit"
Bocca meets with Kei in the illusionary bus. They share thoughts about their dreams, and Bocca reveals his feelings for Sayoko. He learns that Kei and all the rest of the children that Horu, the monster, has devoured are digested repeatedly. Bocca later finds himself back at the stadium facing Horu in battle. Having faced that very same battle before, Bocca easily defeats Horu. Horu escapes to heal himself. Bocca and Kurofune meets once again, Bocca wants Kurofune to leave the maze, he tells him that Sayoko is waiting for him. But Kurofune wants Bocca to leave instead and let him finish Horu himself. They both exchange 'arrow fire', and Bocca loses. Kurofune seeks out Horu, and finds him healed. Kurofune tells Horu that he has already killed him and that he will never be able to leave the maze. Kurofune fires a bolt of arrow into the walls of the maze, and runs through the walls. Bocca who was trapped in the maze finally escapes the maze and is pulled out of the sea waters onto a boat, into the waiting arms of Sayoko. They learn that the island had sunk a long time ago.
15	15	"Fortune River"
Bocca and Sayoko arrives at a tourist spot. Sayoko's investigation into the place reveals that several tourists have gone missing there. They spot the body of Tone's Aibar machine, Skyblue, the blue eyed boy, lying close to the waters. Bocca revives him with the aid of his Aibar machine. They learn that Tone has been taken prisoner at a castle managed by a member of the Monster Union known as Lucky Thoroughbred. Skyblue suddenly warns them that they had been spotted and that the enemy was headed their way. Flying Bunny, a girl in a bunny costume riding a flying board, arrives. Bocca, Sayoko and Skyblue are spotted by her. She goes on an aerial attack. In the battle against Flying Bunny, Bocca's Aibar machine attempts to fly but is unsuccessful. Bocca successfully wounds Flying Bunny, and she retreats to the castle to heal herself. She meets with Lucky Thoroughbred and they exchange some harsh words. Lucky Thoroughbred reveals his intent to set bombs all over the world and then visits his captive, Tone. Skyblue meanwhile, meets up with another Airbar machine, the one who uses boomerangs as weapons. They fight each other. Sayoko meanwhile tries to kiss Bocca, but Bocca hesitates. Sayoko learns why, she realizes that Melody is watching them. Sayoko runs off feeling hurt. She is suddenly greeted by Lucky Thoroughbred in his monster machine. Sayoko however, looks more surprised than afraid. And instead calls him, "brother".
16	16	"Sayoko"
With Sayako and Toune trapped in the castle of Lucky Thoroughbred, Bocca and Koko sneak in to save both. While on the way in, the two get more than a bit comfortable with each other, and Coco tells her story to the boy. Within the castle, a helpless Sayako is reminded of her old family, and of her brother's "achievement" to become a Monster Union agent. Meanwhile, the two Melos Warriors go separate ways. Bocca eventually meets up with Lucky Thoroughbred, agreeing to a race with his robot monster over a lake of water, since if Bocca wins, his friends would be released. At the same time, Koko in off saving Toune, when met up with Flying Bunny, where trouble starts to occur. What happen there? And can Bocca win the race with his flightless Aibar-Machine?
17	17	"Having wings even though one is not an angel"
Tone and Sayako are held hostage in the tower. And Coco and Bocca have gone in to rescue them. However, Shuuma has explosives planted all over the castle and he will not hesitate to set them off.
18	18	"Tokyo Station"
Sayako receives a message to return home. But she wants to know where her relationship with Bocca is going first. The Armed Theatrical Group arrives to search for 'Engine Two'.
19	19	"The War of the 20th Century"
The kidnapped prime minister is interrogated by the Armed Theatrical Group. The prime minister reveals his intended deal with the Monster Union. He also mentions about his lost daughter. The origin of the new Monster King is also revealed.
20	20	"The Sun Is Calling Out to You"
Coco meets her dad finally. The warriors must defeat Electric Sheep. Bocca and Sayako may have to split.
21	21	"Area Out of Range"
The Meros warriors are on the Mahoroba and on a course to Mitranome, however the space port is guarded by the monster union and they intend to stop them.
22	22	"Mitranome"
A new unicorn series is discovered in the ship, but he is not on the side of the Meros Warriors. The battle in the Mitranome goes on.
23	23	"Like an Arrow that Pierced Through the World"
The Vinderlize intends to destroy the Mitranome. Child Dragon utilises a weapon that can immobilise the Aibar Machines. The secret of Project Silent is revealed.
24	24	"And Yet, The Dawn of You Who Begins a Journey"
Bocca returns to Earth and finally meets the Monster King. The Monster King reveals the secret about the Melody of Oblivion.

=== Video game ===
An action adventure game was published by Bandai in Japan on November 25, 2004. Players could select one of three characters, Bocca, Toone, and Koko and play a different scenario for each one.

== Reception ==
THEM Anime Reviews was critical of the anime, writing that "Like band practice on the second day of junior high school., this sophomoric melody isn't laughably bad, but unpleasantly unskilled and in sore need of fine tuning. Gainax completists should ... just quit being Gainax completists. Horror fans might bump this up a star, at most." Anime News Network reviewed the first two DVD releases for the English speaking market, noting that the series had sloppy animation and that although the second volume showed improved storytelling, that the series "still sits in the ranks of run-of-the-mill fantasy adventures. It doesn't do anything to extend the genre further, and the silly monsters and attack names are a strike against it."

DVD Talk panned the final volume in the anime series, as they felt that "Originally, the show had some potential but whatever else was going on in the background, the straightforward aspects of the action themes of the show seemed downplayed to cater to the whimsical elements, making it tougher to sit through as time went on."
