= Neo Ranga =

Television anime

- Cover artwork from the DVD release of Neo Ranga

南海奇皇(ネオランガ) (Nankai Kiou (Neoranga))
- Genre: Adventure, comedy drama, mecha
- Created by: Shō Aikawa; Studio Pierrot; Canyon Music
- Anime television series
- Directed by: Jun Kamiya (eps. 1-24); Toshiyuki Tsuru (eps. 25-48)
- Produced by: Takashi Watanabe; Naoji Hōnokidani; Shinichi Nakamura (Assistant)
- Written by: Shō Aikawa
- Music by: Kuniaki Haishima
- Studio: Studio Pierrot
- Licensed by: US: ADV Films
- Original network: WOWOW
- Original run: 6 April 1998 – 28 September 1999
- Episodes: 48
- icon

Neo Ranga (Japanese: 南海奇皇 (ネオランガ), Hepburn: Nankai Kiou (Neoranga)) is an anime television series created by screenwriter Shō Aikawa, Studio Pierrot, and Pony Canyon. It consists of two seasons, totaling forty-eight episodes. The story is about three orphaned sisters who have, through a mysterious twist of fate, inherited their very own god—the 18 m (59 ft) tall Neo Ranga.

Neo Ranga was originally aired in Japan as part of the omnibus show Anime Complex. ADV Films licensed the anime in English.

== Story ==
The Shimabara sisters (Manami, Ushio, and Yuuhi) are living on their own, with the eldest sister as their breadwinner, when a young man from the fictional island kingdom of Barou, located near Indonesia, arrives with news of their long-missing brother. Their brother had married into the Barou royalty, but died, leaving the sisters as the hereditary rulers of Barou. As the rulers of Barou, they now fall under the protection of the island's god, Neo Ranga, which turns out to be a gigantic biomechanical monster. He follows them back to Japan, running afoul of the Japan Self-Defense Forces, who are revealed to have known everything about Neo Ranga's existence, including the sisters.

The series continues following the sisters as they deal with the adjustments that come from living with Neo Ranga.

== Episodes Summary ==
=== 1st Season ===
1-The beginning- The episode starts with a big hulking monster attacking Tokyo bay. The Shimabara sisters seem to know the origin of this thing. They run away from it knowing what it can cause.

2-The paradise where god dwells-Shifting to 2 months ago, the three sisters are revealed to be chosen rulers of Baroo island, adjacent to Indonesia, where a god resides named Neo Ranga. The god chose them after the brother dies.

3-The deceived twilight-The military have noticed the god, Neo Ranga's connection with the sisters & have captured Minami, the eldest.

4-Embraced in a flash-Ushio was able to control the god, Neo Ranga out of the park, where it was being ambushed to calm down.

5-Carnival in the desert-Minami Shimabara has organized a press conference to calm down all the rough reaction for keeping the god, Neo Ranga in the park.

6-Shine shrapnel, shine!-Yuhi and Joel, her nephew, have broken in a military installation to save Neo Ranga and then she wrecks some stuff in the city with it.

7-Mushahino festival-Minami steps up her game with an official confirmation that the god Neo Ranga, should from now on, be considered the official property of the island of Baroo and must not be treated with hostile forces anymore.

8-The landscape seen through yuhi's eyes-Yuhi sees around her the yakuza forces essentially buying up all the property and the military keeping a very intrusive eye on their household. She thinks Ranga should be used to sort these disturbing elements out properly.

9-Ushio's 1st day-Ushio's first day at her job in the convenience store. But her presence takes away customers from the yakuza-affiliated store, so they vandalize her workplace.

10-Ritual dance-After the vandalizing act, the employer of the store was locked out. Ushio uses Neo Ranga to save her, but when it looked like Ranga was going out of control, Biliya, the girl who arrived with the 3 elders of Baroo island, calmed it down with a ritual dance

11-Kia & Minami-Minami wants to use the threat of Neo Ranga to get lots of hard cash from a bankrobber's stash.

12-The path that Minami chooses-The whole bankrobbing thing was actually not about money, but about getting incriminating evidence regarding politicians buying votes. After Minami cries out, Neo Ranga responds with a hit to the chopper that shot up the robber's car and killed it.

13-Perfect day at banana city-Ushio is going to help her ex-best friend Hiromi from yakuza influence. But this time the yakuza also have a ranga-mimicking mech to take on Neo Ranga.

14-Captured by neon sea-Neo Ranga easily dispatched aforementioned mech.

15-Kyshu trip-The Shimbara trio and the others are going to visit Kyushu. But it seems, on the way, some one has broken through Ushio's luggage and had stolen some stuff. But not money.

16-3 shrines of the heart- Ushio and the others find out that it was actually some men from the island, who wanted to control Neo Ranga. That's why they were trying to find something on Ushio's person, that would resemble a remote. Instead they made a fool of themselves.

17-The excavated body-Yuhi destroys the god that their ancestors were protecting in their home, with Neo Ranga's help.

18-Beach fun-Neo Ranga foils the plans of the loansharking thug that intended to kill innocents by mixing magnesium with exploding powder.

19-The end of summer vacation-The people have started to adjust to Neo Ranga's presence.

20-Big school-Yuhi was getting her Ranga transported to a foreign location by a corrupt principal and a senator. She stops that, and befriends the lonely rich girl called Tomo, who needed a friend.

21-Land of the living law- The status of Neo Ranga has reached godhood level in the community.

22-Broken since the days of old-According to a new addendum to an already established law, the USA is now pressuring to get Neo Ranga for themselves.

23-The hollow king-After Neo Ranga is demonised and Kyo Shinkai are revealed to be the main adversaries, the Shimabara trio and Joel flee to Baroo island.

24-The white tide-The Kyo Shinkai-affiliated armed forces had come to kill the three sisters, but upon calling Neo Ranga comes to put an end to the ensuing slaughter. Then, Ushio and the others decide to take the fight to the mainland.

=== 2nd season ===
25-New era-The area surrounding the Shimabara sisters' mansion has been declared as independent from Japan with USA's help. The Japanese government has been compromised with kyoshinkai infiltrating every aspect of it.

26-The blessed heart of evil- While treasure hunting, the Japanese navy try to get Ranga from Minami, but they fail.

27-Battlefield yearning-A couple thousand Japanese youngsters are coming in and causing in quite a ruckus and instability amidst a truce period between Mushashino district and the Japanese government.

28-Fierce battle-A hitler-youth like frenzy has taken over Ushio's best friend, Tsubasa. He has been commanded to destroy neo ranga after jumping on a biomech. But labiret, after being rescued from hypnosis saves both Ushio and Neo Ranga.

29-To embarrass a king-Ushio agrees to go on a date with an outsider.

30-Courage on display-Ushio and the boy does go for a rescue date, but end up not really going for a relationship.

31-Working it for the camera-A fight with an umbrella-wielding kyo shinkai puppet during a talent show.

32-Trap show-The kyo shinkai are plotting to show Neo Ranga killing an innocent lady, to use it as casus balli. But before that live could start Neo Ranga disposes of the puppet and kills the girl.

33-The great osaka battle (part 1)- Ushio and the others are bout to arrive in Osaka, where an uncontrollable blob-sized kyo shinaki puppet is soon to strike.

34-The great osaka battle (part 2)-Neo Ranga, at Ushio's direction, dispatches of the blob monster.

35-What happened to christmas eve?-Kyo shinkai are trying erase Christmas out of Japan with giant plant life.

36-Christmas in crisis-Neo Ranga was able to defeat the source of vegetation, even though it had tanked the spore attack.

37-One too many greasy spoons-A woman seemingly accused of a killing father-daughter duo has taken Yuhi as hostage.

38-In a world with no punishment-The woman who was used as the scapegoat did kill the critic's daughter. But before she could any more harm, sniper fire disposes of her. Ranga became quite perturbed at this, so much so, that a fissure formed at the head region of ranga; and someone looking like Shimabara's big brother came out of it.

39-He who has awoken-The guy who broke out of the fissure is not their brother, as evidenced by the absence of a mark from a drinking accident.

40-The assura-The lookalike is actually essence of a godlike being compacted in a human form. The only way to stop being the herald of chaotic times, is to keep feeding him.

41-Insurrection-The official full government takeover by kyo shinaki has started.

42-God of a godless land-All out one-to-one fight between Ibuki, the final god-puppet of kyo shinkai, piloted persoanlly by Fujuwara and Neo Ranga. Ranga loses this fight.

43-Recovering secret ground-Fujiwara in his ibuki form has kidnapped Ushio and kyo shinkai have poisoned all the politicians to have uncontested control.

44-Sweet poison- Masaru's spirit saves ushio from the bondage in ibuki. She then flees to Neo Ranga, to control it from the inside.

45-Time lost but not forgotten-Fujiwara is finally defeated by Ushio-controlled Neo Ranga, with Masaru's assistance, the real one.

46-Angels in vogue-After the curiontes from an alien source (wormhole) start turning Japan into a warzone, the sister trio and others take refuge in Baroo island again. Ushio intends to utilize ranga's rage, but Masaru their actual brother reveals himself to be the final enemy.

47-Promises in prophecy-After Masaru explains his god-complex motive in pursuance of his evolved human status, neo ranga after being battered pretty heavily by USA, Chinese and Japanese navy. Ushio gets control of the ranga and positions herself to fight her family.

48-Paradise of destitution-Ranga is revealed to be not a god, but the impossible human perseverance against alien level odds, specifically, Tao. With the power of the trio, the ranga finally unlock it's time sword and dispels of the threat. Masaru and the minx flee to outer space.

== Characters ==
Ushio Shimabara is a somewhat tomboyish, yet slightly shy and a bit reserved fifteen-year-old with a keen sense of justice and selflessness. She quickly accepts Joel's presence, as well as her position as a keeper of Neo Ranga. Ushio is often seen as being more empathetic and sensible than her siblings, especially in regards to Neo Ranga's interactions with everyday Japanese people.

Voice: Yūko Miyamura (Japanese), Kelli Cousins (English)

Minami Shimabara, twenty-four years old, is the eldest of the sisters and essentially acts as a surrogate mother to Ushio and Yuuhi. She works multiple jobs to provide for her family, including delivering newspapers and working as a hostess. She is also the owner of the Star Hole Company, which educates young people on how to handle media pressure as a celebrity, and this experience becomes critical when she and her sisters inherit Neo Ranga. Minami tends to be seen as cold and aloof, partially due to her protective nature and attitude, and partially due to her constant concern with money, and because she is using Neo Ranga for financial gain.

Voice: Yuko Sumitomo (Japanese), Kaytha Coker (English)

Yuuhi Shimabara, thirteen years old, attends a private school in Shinagawa, Tokyo as the result of a scholarship. She is not above using her cute appearance to receive expensive gifts and favors from admirers, even including her teacher. While she is outwardly the most selfish of the sisters, she is also the most popular. Yuuhi takes pleasure in using Neo Ranga to intimidate unsavory elements in her neighborhood such as the yakuza, much to her sisters' consternation.

Voice: Eri Sendai (Japanese), Kira Vincent-Davis (English)

Joel is the harbinger of news from the older brother of the Shimabara trio, and apparently their nephew. He is always accompanied by a small white dragon, and wears his hair in a long braid.

Voice: Kōki Miyata (Japanese), Kevin Corn (English)

Neo Ranga is the giant protector god of Barou resembling a cross between Godzilla and a large, semi-organic mecha, but perhaps more accurately described as being similar to a golem. It is vaguely humanoid in shape, colored black and gray, and covered with red swirls. Neo Ranga does not talk, and is only able to express itself with its movements and its mysterious eyes.

== Kyoshin ==
Antagonistic gods of the series and other members of Ranga's race.

- Lord Reiya
- Minakata
  - Mecha Minakata
- Salume
- Yamase
  - Kamikaze Yamase
- Yoshino
- Hatsune
- Ibuki
- Akasa
- Appa
- Plutiwee

== Music ==
Opening theme

1. Episodes 1-24: "Kaze no Nemuru Shima" – Yūko Miyamura, Yuuko Sumitomo, and Eri Sendai
2. Episodes 25-48: "Kami to Nare" – Kuniaki Haishima

Ending theme

1. Episodes 1-24: "Prologue ~A City In The Sky " by Masaaki Ito
2. Episodes 25-48: "Kawaki No Miwa Ni Te" – Yuko Miyamura, Yuko Sumitomo, and Eri Sendai
