= List of D.N.Angel characters =

This is a list of characters in the manga series D.N.Angel by Yukiru Sugisaki and its anime adaptation.

== Protagonists ==
=== Daisuke Niwa ===
Character Voice:

- Anime: Miyu Irino, Tomoko Kaneda (younger version)
- Drama CD: Sōichirō Hoshi
- English Dub: Kevin Corn

Daisuke Niwa (丹羽 大助, Niwa Daisuke) is the series protagonist who, after turning 14 and confessing his love to, and being rejected by his crush Risa Harada, discovers that a boy called Dark lives within him. Afterwards he transforms into Dark whenever he experiences feelings of love or intimacy with the girl he loves, but Dark can choose not to come out if he so wants. Initially this is Risa Harada, but after she rejects him, Daisuke finds himself falling in love with her twin sister, Riku Harada, who does return his feelings after realizing how kind-hearted and gentle he was. Perceptive, athletic, and artistic, Daisuke is also skilled in dodging traps, picking locks, and other thieving-type activities, due to the daily life-threatening trials his family has him undergo when he gets up in the morning and returns from school in the afternoons.

Though he regularly argues with his alter-ego Dark, he expresses concern for him when he is in danger or in pain. He misses Dark when they are separated within the series through magic, and their dynamic is that of an older/younger brother.

=== Dark Mousy ===
Character Voice:

- Anime: Ryotaro Okiayu
- Drama CD: Masaya Onosaka
- English Dub: Vic Mignogna

Dark Mousy (ダーク・マウジー, Dāku Maujī), is half of the Koku Yoku, an artwork created by the Hikari family, who has appeared in the first male of the Niwa generation for the last 300 years. Once Dark appears, his host will change into Dark whenever he is around the person he loves or thinks about them a great deal, though in the anime, Dark can choose not to appear at such times. At the start of D.N.Angel, Dark had lain dormant for 40 years as his previous host, Daiki Niwa, only had one female offspring. When Emiko's son, Daisuke, reached 14, he became Dark's new "tamer" or host. Known to the public as "Kaitou Dark", (translated as "Phantom Dark" in the ADV Films dub of the anime) Dark steals the cursed art pieces made by the Hikari family, which the Niwa family then seals away to prevent them from causing any more trouble. He primarily uses With as his wings, as using his own true wings causes Daisuke's body tremendous harm. Though he and Daisuke often argue over missions and Risa and Riku Harada, its apparent that Dark cares for his host, taking care not to harm him by using too much of his magic and protecting him when possible. For fun Dark often teases his host Daisuki. Their relationship is often that of older/younger brothers.

Candid and confident, Dark can also appear to be arrogant and something of a playboy, flirting shamelessly with girls. Dark is a notorious flirt, but there are very few he truly cares about. In the anime, he said that he is willing to kiss anyone since it is like a greeting to him rather than something meaningful. After Dark's reappearance, Daisuke's crush, Risa Harada, falls in love with him and begins to pursue him. He initially flirts with her, seemingly to annoy Daisuke, and goes on several dates with her. In the anime, Dark rejects Risa's feelings after telling her that he was once in love with her grandmother and only humored Risa's attraction because she reminded him of his lost love.

In the manga, Dark later changes and grows affection for Risa.

== Antagonists ==
=== Satoshi Hiwatari ===
Character Voice:

- Anime: Akira Ishida
- Drama CD: Tomokazu Seki
- English Dub: Greg Ayres

Satoshi Hiwatari (日渡 怜, Hiwatari Satoshi) or Satoshi Hikari (氷狩 怜, Hikari Satoshi) is the police commander in charge of capturing Dark. He is extremely intelligent, Satoshi graduated from high school at the age of eight, and obtained a college degree at the age of 13. He enrolled in Daisuke's middle school in order to be closer to Daisuke, whom he knew was Dark's alter ego. Calm and composed, he often pays little mind to those around him and rarely shows his emotions causing others to find him distant and cold. Daisuke seems unaffected by his distant nature, and insists on becoming his friend. Reluctant at first, Satoshi comes to accept Daisuke's friendship, though later withdraws from school to try to distance himself from Daisuke again out of fear. He eventually returns to offer to aid rescuing Risa from Argentine.

Satoshi is the last heir of the Hikari family, which created powerful artworks that the Niwa family has been stealing for years via Dark. In the anime version, Kosuke made a play on words with Satoshi's last name being synonymous with light (also pronounced 'hikari'), though the kanji for Satoshi's family name actually means 'ice hunter'.

Although he is just as capable of creating artwork as his ancestors have been, he avoids doing so. This is both to go against his fate and to avoid creating any more dangerous artworks. In the anime, he was shown painting in flashbacks of when he was a child and getting praise from his adopted father before the man became abusive.

After his mother's death, Satoshi was adopted by the Hiwatari family. His adoptive father appears to be aware of the Hikari and in the anime adaptation attempts to use the power of the artworks for his own purposes, eventually getting killed by one of the artworks he tries to harness the power of. Satoshi is shown to have a strong dislike for his adopted father, and refuses to play along when the man tries to pass the two of them off as a close family.

Much as Daisuke houses the soul of Dark Mousy, Satoshi holds that of his opposite, Krad. Unlike Dark, Krad is homicidal and cares nothing for Satoshi, causing Satoshi to regularly fight to keep him inside. It is suggested that Satoshi wears glasses as a way of helping him keep Krad in check, as he notes that he does not actually need them and once they are removed he almost immediately feels Krad trying to emerge.

Although Satoshi is viewed as the main antagonist in the series. He can be considered as a secondary protagonist due to his strong friendship with Daisuke, as well his rebellion toward Krad.

In the manga version, Satoshi and Daisuke are inconvenient but genuine friends who both try to protect each other from their alter egos, and their friendship is tested and strengthened by their mutual afflictions. However, the closer they grow to friendship, the more complicated their rivalries become. Satoshi has an intense dislike for Dark, similar to Dark's dislike of Krad. It is told bluntly by Satoshi to Daisuke that if the curse continues as is, then Satoshi will be killed by Krad.

In the anime, it has been stated by Dark that Daisuke is the one who causes Satoshi to turn into Krad. Satoshi wants to be close to Daisuke despite the danger of Krad to both of them.

Several times in both manga and anime, it is made apparent just how little Krad cares for Satoshi. Whereas Daisuke is spared the pain of enduring the magic used by Dark via With, and Dark trying to keep the magic use to a minimum, Krad often uses the max amount of power he can summon, and when he takes over his white wings rip from Satoshi's back causing him great pain, and leaving two narrow injures on his back where the wings once were.

=== Krad ===
Character Voice:

- Anime: Takeshi Kusao
- Drama CD: Taiki Matsuno
- English Dub: Illich Guardiola

Krad (クラッド, Kuraddo) is an entity similar to Dark, living inside his "tamer" Satoshi Hiwatari. He is Dark's opposite in many ways, including his name ('Dark' spelled backwards), having blond hair, wearing white attire, and always speaking very politely using an extremely formal speech pattern. Krad is Dark's and, by extension, Daisuke's worst enemy, repeatedly attempting to kill them both. Though Krad refers to Hiwatari as Master Satoshi and as "his everything", he shows little regard for Hiwatari's wishes and well-being. He ignores Hiwatari's repeated attempts to get him to leave Daisuke alone and regularly uses his magic without limit, causing Hiwatari to collapse in agony. Like Daisuke, Hiwatari has little control over his transformation though he can force Krad to go back inside his body at times.

== Supporting characters ==
=== Risa Harada ===
Character Voice:

- Anime: Masumi Asano
- Drama CD: Sakura Tange
- English Dub: Luci Christian

Risa Harada (原田 梨紗, Harada Risa) is Daisuke Niwa's friend and his initial object of affection. At the start of the series, she rejects his confession of love, feeling that he is too "normal" and only able to see him as her friend. After seeing Daisuke's alter ego Dark, she falls in love with the thief and believes that he is the mysterious person she is destined to be with. Innocent, spoiled, and depicted as "girly-girl", Risa is often seen as the opposite of her twin sister Riku, though both show the same stubbornness and tenacity, particularly when it comes to people they care about. She is initially confused with Riku and Daisuke falling in love, and so she becomes jealous, but realizes that she was more afraid of losing her older sister and her friend than wanting Daisuke for herself, and becomes supportive of their relationship.

Wanting to be with Dark, Risa begins taking great risks to try to see him during his thieving adventures. Dark initially accepts her affections, then rejects her when he realizes she truly loves him. However, Risa refuses to give him up and after noting that she has "become a lady" he agrees to go on a date with her. During the date, she is kidnapped by Argentine who takes her to his world and demands that she, as Dark's "maiden", help him become more like Dark.

Satoshi Hiwatari is also seen as showing a bit of concern for her in the manga, deliberately transforming into Krad—something he normally fights—to try and save her when he sees her falling from a tower during Argentine's attack.

As the series progresses, Risa's attitude and childish behavior dies down a bit, though she retains her girly nature. She has made several accounts of being more responsible than she was at the beginning of the series. Stated by Riku herself that her sister was just 'too nice', example being when they were children Risa gave up her bunny to Riku who had lost her teddy bear despite loving her bunny a lot. Risa also cares about both Riku and Daisuke, feeling that Daisuke has finally 'got his act together' and sees him in a new light. Risa has made many mature decisions and has shown that, despite her selfishness, she can be just as kind as her twin sister, Riku.

In the anime adaptation, Risa's crush on Dark appears to die down towards the end of the series, because in the anime, Dark had already fallen in love 40 years ago with the twins' grandmother, Rika. Instead, she finds an interest in Satoshi at the end. Not wanting to tarnish those feelings or end up as a replacement, Risa gradually stopped pursuing Dark as a romantic interest. In the manga, however, this plot does not exist. Her feelings for Dark still remain strong, even when Dark told her that he wasn't human.

=== Riku Harada ===
Character Voice:

- Anime: Sara Nakayama
- Drama CD: Yuka Imai
- English Dub: Hilary Haag

Riku Harada (原田 梨紅, Harada Riku) is Risa Harada's twin sister, and a friend of Daisuke Niwa. Athletic and intelligent, Riku is depicted as a tomboy, who is more serious, and down-to-earth than her sister. Though more outspoken than Risa, Riku can be shy and Risa notes that her sister doesn't realize just how popular she is. Though the girls are different in personality, Riku is protective of her sister and they share a tight bond. When Risa is kidnapped by the Argentine, Riku falls into a coma.

Though Riku initially appears to only see Daisuke as a friend, its soon revealed that she harbors romantic feelings for him, though he initially can only see Risa. After her sister rejects him, Riku begins to see him less as clumsy and unreliable, coming to see his strengths and admitting to the feelings she herself had been denying. While trying to sort out her feelings, she remembers that they had met as children when he'd helped her retrieve her precious teddy bear from over a fence one night. Eventually she admits her feelings, but initially is disbelieving when Daisuke tells her he feels the same. Realizing he is speaking the truth, they become a couple.

Riku intensely dislikes Dark, feeling he is nothing but a thief and a playboy, however when Risa is in danger and he promises he will bring her back, she begins to soften her stance towards him. She also sometimes compares him to Daisuke, though she does not yet know that Daisuke is Dark.

In the anime adaptation, Riku is more uncertain of her relationship with Daisuke, temporarily hating that he calls both her and Risa "Harada-san". She thought Dark stole her first kiss but it was actually Daisuke. When Dark was going to kiss Riku, Dark turned back to Daisuke. At the end of the anime, Riku is the only person not in the Niwa or Hikari/Hiwatari family to know that Daisuke is Dark.

=== Emiko Niwa ===
Character Voice:

- Anime: Sakiko Tamagawa, Taeko Kawata (younger version)
- Drama CD: Yūko Nagashima
- English Dub: Kelly Manison

Emiko Niwa (丹羽 笑子, Niwa Emiko) is Daisuke's mother. Growing up, she was upset that because she was born a woman, she couldn't be the next Dark. Resolving to be Dark's mother if she couldn't be Dark, she constantly asked potential mates if they would give her a son, resulting in her regularly being rejected, until she met Kosuke. He was the first to ask her why she wanted a child so much. They fell in love and were married, with Kosuke agreeing to take on the Niwa surname to continue it to the next generation.

Emiko can be hyperactive, and Daisuke notes that sometimes she does not act her age. At time, she seems inconsiderate and unconcerned about Daisuke's situation, but she makes it clear that she does love him and will always watch over him. In addition to training Daisuke, she is in charge of sending out the notices for Dark's upcoming thefts. Emiko also possesses some skills in disguises.(For example: In the manga, she covered up for Daisuke's disappearance on his date with Riku by going as a shop clerk and giving Daisuke a mirror for Riku, which, in actuality, is a Hikari artwork.)

In the anime adaptation, her hyperactivity and lack of maturity are increased. She also makes costumes for Daisuke and Dark to wear while out thieving.

=== Kosuke Niwa ===
Character Voice:

- Anime: Masaki Terasoma
- Drama CD: Toshihiko Seki
- English Dub: Andy McAvin

Kosuke Niwa (丹羽 小助, Niwa Kosuke) is the father of Daisuke Niwa and husband to Emiko. When he married Emiko, he agreed to take on the Niwa last name, to retain the family surname for future generations. At the start of the series, he has been on a journey for approximately 12 years, researching the phenomenon of Dark and the history of the Hikari and Niwa rivalry. As such, he has learned a lot about magic and the magical artifacts created by the Hikari clan. When Kosuke returns home, he gives Daisuke a ring, which gives Daisuke the ability to forcefully change back from Dark one time, and Satoshi also receives the same ring to allow him one time to control Krad. Kosuke is shy and can be serious in nature, but can be very clumsy and is easily embarrassed by his wife and her antics. When Daisuke is pulled into his painting by the Second Hand of Time, Kosuke is able to explain the true history of the fairy tale, Ice and Snow and assist in rescuing his son.

In the anime adaptation, he gives Daisuke a ring called the Rutile of Grief, allowing Kosuke to share Daisuke's pain during a lengthy battle with Krad.

=== Daiki Niwa ===
Character Voice:

- Anime: Takeshi Aono, Hirokazu Hiramatsu (younger version)
- Drama CD: Eiji Maruyama, Mugihito (younger version)
- English Dub: John Swasey

Daiki Niwa (丹羽 大樹, Niwa Daiki) is Daisuke's grandfather and Emiko's father. Forty years before the start of the series, he was the last Niwa to be possessed by Dark. He aids Emiko in preparing Daisuke for his work as Dark, then after the transition is able to offer him some advice on the dealing with things. When he was possessed by Dark, Daiki took his role of stealing the Hikari creations very seriously, as he knew why the thefts were necessary. He also appears to have had a more even partnership with Dark, regularly working on his own without transforming. During his work, he met a girl named Menou whom he regularly stopped to visit her while working. After her death from illness, her spirit continued waiting for Daiki, mistaking Daisuke for his grandfather due to their strong visual resemblance. It is shown during the 10th vol. that Daiki still retains his old 'talents' like when he was once connected with Dark, able to flawlessly disguise himself as Dark long enough for the original to arrive to take his place on his date with Risa.

=== Wiz ===
Character Voice:

- Drama CD: Megumi Toyoguchi
- English Dub: Mariela Ortiz

With (ウィズ, Wizu) is the family pet of the Niwa family and Dark Mousy's familiar. With can sense when Dark is calling him, no matter how much distance is between them and is capable of transforming into both Daisuke and Dark. In the anime, he can't speak very well, often just saying Daisuke's name (which sounds very close to Daisuki, the Japanese word to "like a lot" or "love", where in the English dub he says "I like you"), however, in the manga, he can speak reasonably well. With is afraid of water as he cannot swim, and is easily scared by horror films and haunted houses.

=== Towa ===
Character Voice:

- Anime: Rie Tanaka
- English Dub: Monica Rial

Towa (永遠の標, Towa no Shirube), who insists on being called "Towa-chan," is a creation of the Hikari family. She first appears in the fifth volume of the manga series when she emerges to assist Daisuke. Released from servitude by Satoshi and after she is helped by Daisuke, Towa chose to begin living in the Niwa household. She assists Daisuke and Dark when possible in their work, enjoying shopping and cooking with his mother. Towa has the ability to detect magical items and can change between her human form and that of a small bird.

In the anime adaptation, she usually only changes to bird form when weak or flustered.

=== Chief Superintendent Hiwatari ===
Character Voice:

- Anime: Rikiya Koyama
- English Dub: John Gremillion

Chief Superintendent Hiwatari (日渡 警視長, Hiwatari keishichō) is the Commissioner of the Police department and Satoshi's adoptive father who appears in both manga and anime. He is ruthless (especially to Satoshi) and has a great obsession of the Hikari's artworks, which is also one of the reasons for him adopting their last descendant, Satoshi. He sent Satoshi back to middle school to spy on Daisuke Niwa and also hired the young prodigy to become Chief Commander of Police and in charge of capturing Dark even though he always interferes. In the anime, he was the one who found the voodoo doll that is Mio Hio and sent her to the same school as Satoshi to make Daisuke wear a magical pendant in exchange of giving her a real human body. It was also revealed that he asked Krad to work for him and help in awakening the Black Wings by searching for an Ax-like object passed down to the Hikari, which was later found sealed inside a marble chair with an intact wing on the right and a broken wing on the left which is found in Satoshi's room inside his apartment. Although he may be cold, it is shown that he once had a soft side to Satoshi. This is shown once by Mio Hio, wherein he complimented Satoshi while he was painting and that he thought of Satoshi before he died.

=== Argentine ===
Argentine (アージェンタイン, Ājentain) is a mysterious boy who seems to have something against Dark, and kidnapped Risa during her date with the phantom thief. According to Kosuke, Argentine was a piece of art created and destroyed by the Hikari family long ago. He has stated that he wants to become Kokuyoku, in other words, the mix of Dark and Krad, and that he needs Risa's help to do this. During the twelfth book, he reveals that he is trying to recreate "Qualia," another piece of living artwork originally made to always be by his side. He is ultimately destroyed after a fight between Dark and Argentine, and Argentine appears to turn to stone. In the December 2008 chapter he returns to be found in Daisuke's basement and is recruited by Emiko to be the family butler, much to Towa's displeasure. He also shows an alternate form as a small gecko-like lizard.

=== Keiji Saga ===
Character Voice:

- Drama CD: Kenichi Suzumura

Keiji Saga (佐賀 京二, Saga Keiji) is the producer for Saga Entertainment, though he is similar in age to Daisuke. He first appeared in volume 3 of the manga, when he sent some of his employees to kidnap Daisuke in order to ask him to star in a commercial. He is very energetic and shows little regard for the personal space or privacy of others, and occasionally gets called a pervert for it. He also seems to have an obsession of sorts for Daisuke. When Daisuke needed to try on the outfit for the commercial, Saga tried to undress Daisuke himself, and also started to take off his own clothing, but was stopped when his secretary hit him with a book and asked what he was doing. During the Toki no Byoushin arc, he temporarily transferred to Daisuke's school in order to oversee the Ice and Snow play. He seems to be able to tell when Dark is in control of Daisuke's body ("Where's that aura of his that makes me wanna just jump on him?!") and later on, he also suspected Daisuke of being Dark. He followed him around for a while in an attempt to prove this. However, he was fooled when With transformed into Daisuke at the same time Dark was stealing an artwork.

=== Mio Hio ===
Character Voice:

- Anime: Taeko Kawata
- English Dub: Jessica Boone

Mio Hio (桧尾 みお, Hio Mio) is a character that only appears in the anime adaptation of D.N.Angel. A living voodoo doll created by Kei Hiwatari, Mio is given the appearance of a student Daisuke's age and given the false background of a transfer student from America. Her body is a temporary form. In order to obtain a real life, Kei tells her that she must sacrifice someone, Daisuke, by getting him to wear half of a pair of a powerful charm that would steal his soul. However, as she got to know Daisuke, she fell in love with him, and decided she didn't want him to die. Having given Riku the charms to get Daisuke to wear them, she raced to get them back but arrived too late. She uses her powers to negate the charms effects, leaving her permanently sealed inside Riku's charm. The original doll, now lifeless, is later seen laying in Kei's trashcan. Bodiless, Mio's spirit later uses the Harada twins as a medium in order to both aid Daisuke and Dark, and to save Hiwatari's father when he tries to activate a living artwork. Though she is able to stop it from being activated, Kei still dies. Having used the last of her power, she asks the twins to thank Daisuke for helping her feel alive, tells Riku to be happy with Daisuke, then fades away.

=== Takeshi Saehara ===
Character Voice:

- Anime: Minoru Shiraishi, Yumiko Kobayashi (younger version)
- Drama CD: Wataru Takagi
- English Dub: Kira Vincent-Davis

Takeshi Saehara (冴原 剛, Saehara Takeshi) is Daisuke's schoolmate and friend of ten years. As the son of Police Inspector Saehara, who is pursuing Dark under the command of Hiwatari Satoshi, he is shown to be an enthusiastic reporter who uses his father's contacts to obtain news, particularly about Dark. Excitable, friendly, rude and irresponsible, Takeshi can be reckless in making plans to get photographs of Dark. He is seen bribing Daisuke into doing his homework and his duties at school by offering candid photographs of Risa. Takeshi is shown to do all of the house work at home, and is considered a good cook by his fellow students.

In the anime adaptation Takeshi is shown to also bribe female students with pictures of Dark to get them to perform his work for him. In the anime, he falls in love with the character Mio Hio, a living voodoo doll, who did not return his affections.

== See also ==
- List of D.N.Angel chapters
- List of D.N.Angel episodes
