= Byakuya (True Light) =

Single by Shunichi Miyamoto
- Released: May 7, 2003
- Recorded: 2003
- Label: Victor Entertainment (VICL-35479)
- Songwriters: Sakai Mikio, Yamazaki Masumi

Shunichi Miyamoto singles chronology
"Byakuya (True Light)" (2003)	"Saigo No Kiss" (2004)

"Byakuya (True Light)" (白夜 ～True Light～, White Night (True Light)) is a song by Shunichi Miyamoto. It was released as Miyamoto's debut CD single by Victor Entertainment on May 7, 2003. On the Oricon weekly singles chart, it placed at number twenty-eight. The TV version of the song was used as the opening song for the anime series D.N.Angel.

== Track listing ==
CD
No.	Title	Lyrics	Music	Length
1.	"Byakuya (True Light)"	Mikio Sakai (酒井ミキオ, Sakai Mikio)	Masumi Yamazaki (山崎ますみ, Yamazaki Masumi)
2.	"Byakuya (True Light)" (piano solo)	Sakai	Yamazaki
3.	"Byakuya (True Light)" (acoustic version)	Sakai	Yamazaki
4.	"Byakuya (True Light)" (TV version)	Sakai	Yamazaki
5.	"Byakuya (True Light)" (instrumental)	Sakai	Yamazaki
