= Minawo =

Japanese band

みなを/Minawo
- Origin: Kitakyushu, Japan
- Genres: Pop; Shibuya-kei; Pop-folk; Electronic
- Years active: 1999–present
- Label: Own label
- Members: Minako Yamaguchi; Mitsuwo Matsuura

Minawo (みなを, minawo) is a Japanese band composed of the singer and songwriter Minako Yamaguchi (山口みなこ, Yamaguchi Minako) and the musical composer Mitsuwo Matsuura (松浦みつを, Matsūra Mitsuwo). The band's name, "Minawo", is a portmanteau of the given names of the bandmates, Minako, and Mitsuwo. Minawo is known in anime circles for performing the ending themes to both D.N.Angel and Melody of Oblivion.

Minawo was formed in 1999 after Matsuura and Yamaguchi met in a club while both were attending University of Kitakyushu.

== Discography ==
- 自主製作 (jishu seisaku, literally, independent production) (demo) (1999)
- プラスチックワールド (purasutikku wārudo, plastic world) mini album, (2001)
- mon・mon, (2002)
- あしあと (ashiato, footprints), (2004)
- VALB NEXT, (2004)
- あくび工房 (akubi kōbō, yawn workshop) mini album (2007)

== Singles ==
- 眠り (nemuri, literally, sleep), (2001)
- GROOVE ROCK vol. 1, (2002)
- やさしい午後 (yasashii gogo, gentle afternoon) - D.N.Angel, ending theme 1. (2003)
- はじまりの日 (hajimari no hi, the day it begins) - D.N.Angel, ending theme 2. (2003)
- てのひらの光 (tenohira no hikari, palm of light) - Melody of Oblivion ending theme. (2004)
- ピアノ楽譜 (piano gakufu, piano score) 2004

== Compilations ==
- D.N.Angel Vocal Collection (2003)
- Melody of Oblivion OST (2004)
