= Shunichi Miyamoto =

Japanese musical artist and voice actor (born 1986)

- 宮本 駿一
- Born: April 1, 1986 (age 39); Tokyo, Japan
- Occupation(s): Singer, voice actor, actor, pianist
- Years active: 2003–present
- Musical career
- Birth name: Shunichi Miyamoto
- Genres: Japanese Pop
- Labels: 2003–2007 Victor Entertainment; 2008–present Tri-Arion

Shunichi Miyamoto (宮本 駿一, Miyamoto Shun'ichi; born April 1, 1986) is a Japanese musical artist and voice actor. He is noted for having performed several songs for the anime adaptation of D.N.Angel.

== Biography ==
=== Early life and music interest ===
Miyamoto started playing the piano at the age of four. Later, he enrolled to a vocal school around the same time he entered high school.

=== 2002–2007 ===
He made his singing debut with the single "Byakuya: True Light", the opening theme song for the anime D.N.Angel. He was soon signed up by JVC music as a solo artist and started to release his own music. His first mini-album, Anges (meaning "angels" in French) contains many of the songs that were used in D.N.Angel, namely "Michishirube" and live versions of "Byakuya: True Light", and "Caged Bird".

He was cast with the role of Shani Andras in Mobile Suit Gundam SEED. However, it appears he has not done much voice-acting so far apart from this role and one or two minor roles in a few other anime including D.N.Angel, although Miyamoto was able to reprise his role as Shani for subsequent appearances.

He has also started his own internet radio called Miyasoba, which runs fortnightly. He covers a variety of things for each episode such as reading out letters/greetings he has received by post or email; previews of his new songs or some piano pieces he is still working on, as well as talking about what is new with his current life and plans.

Miyamoto's CD album Piano n Piano was released in August 2007 and charted highly on the Japanese independent music charts.

=== 2008–present ===
In 2008, Miyamoto signed to Tri-Arion and left Victor Entertainment. He changed his stage name to Shunn. His first single released under this new name is "Ihōjin/Sakura Sakukoro".

Miyamoto performs at live jazz, classical and other musical events across Japan (mostly at a concert hall called 恵比寿天窓 Switch – a popular place with many semi-professional musician, including Hoshino Michiru (AKB48)).

== Discography ==
=== Studio albums ===
- 2003: Anges
- 2005: For Someone Needs Love
- 2006: Talkin' Piano
- 2007: Piano'n Piano

=== Singles ===
- 2003: "Byakuya (True Light)"
- 2004: "Saigo No Kiss"
- 2005: "Eien"
- 2008: "Ihōjin/Sakura Sakukoro"

== Filmography ==
- D.N.Angel (2003) – Miyamoto (cameo)
- Mobile Suit Gundam SEED (2002) – Shani Andras
