= Byakuya (gelato) =

Japanese luxurious gelato

- Alternative names: White night
- Type: Gelato
- Place of origin: Japan
- Created by: Cellato
- Main ingredients: Tuber magnatum (white truffles)

Byakuya (Japanese: 白夜, lit. 'white night') is a Japanese gelato considered luxurious that is, according to the Guinness Book of World Records, the world's most expensive ice cream that is priced at ¥873,400 ($6,696) for a single 130 mL (4.4 ounce) serving.

== Gelato ==
The gelato is exclusively produced by the Japan-based company Cellato, which sources its ingredients privately. Among these ingredients are white truffles from Alba, located in the Piedmont region of Italy, a place known as the premier origin of some of the most carefully cultivated and highly sought-after white truffles in the world. The gelato is made with white truffles and is topped with edible gold leaf. It includes two types of cheese: Parmigiano Reggiano, an Italian cheese product that adds nut like flavor, and Sake kasu, a paste-like byproduct of sake production that adds a subtle fermented flavor. Other non-luxury ingredients include milk, sugar, egg yolk, rice and rice malt, black truffle, brewed alcohol, cashew nuts and unspecified dairy products. It is considered rich in both taste and texture, with the cheese contributing a fruit-like complexity to the flavor, offering subtle sweet and tangy notes that balance the richness, adding depth to the overall flavor profile.

The creators of the gelato, Cellato, state that it took them one and a half years to create the recipe.
