= Yukiru Sugisaki =

Japanese manga artist

- Born: December 26, 1974 (age 51); Japan
- Occupation: Manga artist
- Notable work: D.N.Angel; The Candidate for Goddess

Yukiru Sugisaki (杉崎 ゆきる, Sugisaki Yukiru; born December 26, 1974) is a Japanese manga artist. She has created numerous manga in several demographics, but is perhaps best known for creating the seinen series The Candidate for Goddess and the shōjo series D.N.Angel.

== Career ==
Yukiru Sugisaki started drawing in elementary school and began creating manga at around age 17 or 18. The Kadokawa Shoten shōjo magazine Monthly Asuka published her manga Namaiki no "N" in 1995. After her next work Sotsugyou M, Sugisaki's popular D.N. Angel and The Candidate for Goddess series were simultaneously serialized in Monthly Asuka and the seinen magazine Comic Gum respectively. She also worked on the manga version of Brain Powerd with Yoshiyuki Tomino. Since then, Sugisaki has created numerous one-shots and serializations in many different genres. Infamous for abandoning stories before completion, she regards shōjo as an influence on her story-writing and shōnen as an influence on her illustration style.

== Works ==
=== Manga ===
- Namaiki no "N" (1995, published in Monthly Asuka)
- Sotsugyou M (1996–1997, serialized in Monthly Asuka)
- D.N. Angel (1997–2021, serialized in Monthly Asuka)
- The Candidate for Goddess (1997–2001, serialized in Comic Gum)
- H2Oplanet (1997, published in The Candidate for Goddess volume 1)
- The Demon Returns (1998, published in D.N. Angel volume 2)
- Brain Powerd (1998–1999, serialized in Shōnen Ace)
- Kanno Ie Ha Kanai Anzen. (2000, serialized in Monthly Ace Next)
- Lagoon Engine (2002–2007, serialized in Monthly Asuka)
- Rizelmine (2001–2002, serialized in Monthly Ace Next)
- Lagoon Engine Einsatz (2004, serialized in Newtype USA)
- Eden (2006–2007, serialized in Shōnen Ace)
- Ascribe to Heaven (2008–ongoing, serialized in Young King OURs)
- Yume Bi To Manami No Kie Ta Birthday Present? (2009, published by Kadokawa Shoten)
- School Girls Pin-up (2011–ongoing, serialized in Comic Birz)
- 1001 Knights (2012–2017, serialized in Monthly Asuka)
- Junkissa Neko (2012–ongoing, serialized in Comic Birz)

=== Art books ===
- Neutral (1999, published by Kadokawa Shoten)
- Final Quest Sailor Kanzenban (2002, published by Kadokawa Shoten)
- D.N. Angel Illustrations Feder (2003, published by Kadokawa Shoten)
- Street Fighter Art Comic Anthology (2009, published by Enterbrain)
