= D.N.Angel =

Japanese manga and anime series

- Cover of the first tankōbon volume, released in Japan on November 13, 1997
- Genre: Action, fantasy, romance
- Manga
- Written by: Yukiru Sugisaki
- Published by: Kadokawa Shoten
- English publisher: NA: Tokyopop (former); Viz Media (digital); Yen Press (new edition)
- Magazine: Monthly Asuka
- Original run: November 1997 – January 22, 2021
- Volumes: 20
- Light novel
- Written by: Junko Okazaki; Yukiru Sugisaki
- Illustrated by: Yukiru Sugisaki
- Published by: Kadokawa Shoten
- Imprint: Kadokawa Beans Bunko
- Original run: March 2000 – October 2000
- Volumes: 3
- Anime television series
- Directed by: Koji Yoshikawa; Nobuyoshi Habara
- Written by: Naruhisa Arakawa
- Music by: Takahito Eguchi; Tomoki Hasegawa
- Studio: Xebec
- Licensed by: AUS: Madman Entertainment; NA: Discotek Media
- Original network: TXN (TV Tokyo)
- English network: UK: Rockworld TV
- Original run: April 3, 2003 – September 25, 2003
- Episodes: 26
- Light novel

D.N. Angel TV Animation Series
- Written by: Maki Arisa; Yukiru Sugisaki
- Illustrated by: Yukiru Sugisaki
- Published by: Kadokawa Shoten
- Imprint: Kadokawa Beans Bunko
- Original run: July 31, 2003 – September 30, 2003
- Volumes: 2
- Video game

D.N.Angel: Kurenai no Tsubasa
- Publisher: Takara
- Genre: Fantasy, Romance
- Platform: PlayStation 2
- Released: September 25, 2003
- Manga

D.N.Angel TV Animation Series
- Written by: Yukiru Sugisaki
- Published by: Kadokawa Shoten
- Magazine: Monthly Asuka
- Original run: August 1, 2003 – October 1, 2003
- Volumes: 2
- Manga

DDNAngels
- Written by: Yukiru Sugisaki
- Published by: Kadokawa Shoten
- Magazine: Asuka
- Original run: November 22, 2024 – present
- icon

D.N.Angel (stylized as D•N•ANGEL) is a Japanese manga series written and illustrated by Yukiru Sugisaki. The manga premiered in Japan in the Kadokawa Shoten shōjo magazine Monthly Asuka in November 1997. After two extended hiatuses the series concluded in 2021. Kadokawa Shoten has collected the individual chapters and published them in 15 tankōbon and 5 e-books. The manga series was previously licensed for English language release in North America and the United Kingdom by Tokyopop who had released 13 volumes of the series up until 2011.

A sequel manga, titled DDNAngels, began serializing in Asuka in November 2024.

The story follows an average middle schooler named Daisuke Niwa, who, upon being rejected by his crush, unexpectedly awakens his phantom thief alter ego Dark Mousy. He then realizes that the transformation he undergoes is an inherited trait shared by all the males in his family, and that his mission is to collect and purify the stolen pieces of art of which Dark seeks to maintain from evil.

Xebec adapted the manga into a 26-episode anime series which aired in Japan on TV Tokyo from April to September 2003. The anime was later adapted into second two volume manga series, a PlayStation 2 video game, and a series of drama CDs.

== Plot ==
D.N.Angel follows the adventures of Daisuke Niwa, an average teenage boy. At the story's opening, Daisuke declares love for his crush, a girl named Risa Harada, on his fourteenth birthday. She rejects him, and later that day, the heart-broken Daisuke undergoes a strange mutation that changes him into another person. He is told calmly by his mother Emiko that, because of a strange genetic condition, all the males in Daisuke's family gain the countenance of Dark Mousy, a famous phantom thief. The transformation occurs every time Daisuke has romantic feelings for his crush or whenever he thinks too long about her. Dark changes back into Daisuke the same way. Daisuke is forced to keep his family's secret and control his alter ego, Dark (whom Risa, Daisuke's crush, has fallen for), while dashing his way out of being caught by the commander of the police. Daisuke learns that in order to return to normality, he must have his unrequited love returned.

The aforementioned commander of the police is a classmate of Daisuke's named Satoshi Hiwatari. Hiwatari suffers from his own version of the phantom-thief curse, and a bond forms between Hiwatari and Daisuke because of their similar afflictions. Hiwatari carries the alter-ego named Krad. However, though Dark and Krad hate one another, Hiwatari and Daisuke maintain a strained but genuine friendship, despite Dark's constant moaning. Dark steals certain artistic objects of value, works made by Satoshi's ancestors, because they contain dangerous magical properties. Some of them, such as "The Second Hand of Time" and "Argentine" also have personalities of their own. Some of the objects that he steals are quite dangerous. Dark's method of stealing is based on garnering attention; before stealing, Emiko will send out a warning of what will be stolen.

== Media ==
=== Manga ===
Written and illustrated by Yukiru Sugisaki, D.N.Angel premiered in Japan in the November 1997 issue of the Kadokawa Shoten magazine Monthly Asuka. New chapters were serialized monthly until Sugisaki put the series on an extended hiatus after the August 2005 issue. The series eventually returned to serialization, starting in the April 2008 issue of Monthly Asuka. In 2011 the series went on another extended hiatus and resumed on May 24, 2018. The final chapter was published on the March 2021 issue of Monthly Asuka, released on January 22, 2021. The individual chapters are collected and published in tankōbon volumes by Kadokawa Shoten. The first volume was released on November 13, 1997; a total of 20 volumes have been released.

Tokyopop licensed the series for an English-language release in North America and the United Kingdom, with the first volume of the series released there on April 6, 2004. On November 8, 2005, Tokyopop released a box set containing the first two volumes of the series. A total of 13 volumes have been translated and released as of December 8, 2009. However, Tokyopop announced that its North American division would close on May 31, 2011, leaving the fate of the manga's localization in question. In 2014, Viz Media picked up the digital publication rights to the manga for Kindle. During their panel at Sakura-Con 2025, Yen Press announced that they had licensed the new edition volumes of the series for English publication.

In August 2003, while the primary series was on hiatus, a second manga series, D.N.Angel TV Animation Series began serialization in Monthly Asuka. Also written by Sugisaki, the short series was based on the anime adaptation, which had diverged from the storyline of the manga series. D.N.Angel TV Animation Series finished its serialization in the October 2003 issue. It was published in two tankōbon volumes by Kadokawa Shoten.

A sequel manga by Sugisaki, DDNAngels, started in Asuka on November 22, 2024.

=== Anime ===
D.N.Angel was adapted into a 26-episode anime series produced by TV Tokyo, Dentsu and Xebec which aired in Japan on TV Tokyo from April 3 to September 25, 2003. The series was directed by Koji Yoshikawa and Nobuyoshi Habara.

The series was originally licensed for release in North America and the United Kingdom by ADV Films. While in the UK the series is no longer licensed, in North America Discotek Media have announced the rescue-licensing of the series. The series is licensed in Australia and New Zealand by Madman Entertainment.

Five pieces of theme music are used in the anime adaptation. The song Byakuya -True Light- (白夜 〜True Light〜; "White Night -True Light-"), by Shunichi Miyamoto, is used for the opening for twenty four episodes. Vic Mignogna, the English voice actor for Dark Mousy, covered the opening for the English dub. For the ending theme, Yasashii Gogo (やさしい午後; "Gentle Afternoon") is used for the first twelve episodes, and Hajimari no Hi (はじまりの日; "The Day It Begins") is used for episodes 13–23 and episode 25. Both songs are performed by Minawo. Episode 24 uses the song "Caged Bird", by Shunichi Miyamoto, for its ending, while the final episode of the series uses Miyamoto's song Michishirube (道標; "Guidepost").

=== Video game ===
A PlayStation 2 video game, D.N.Angel: Kurenai no Tsubasa (D·N·ANGEL〜紅の翼〜, Deī.Enu.Enjeru ~Kurenai no Tsubasa~; lit. 'D.N.Angel: Crimson Wings'), was published by Takara. The game was released in Japan on September 25, 2003, to coincide with the conclusion of the anime adaptation. However, the game storyline is closer to the manga, and even mentions past events from the manga that would make it inconsistent with the anime.

=== Drama CDs ===
A trilogy of drama CDs called D.N.Angel Wink was released in 1999 between March and December. Some of the scenes follow the manga word-for-word, while others have either minor differences or do not appear in the manga at all. The first CD is called "Target: Sleeping Beauty" and was released on March 5, 1999. The second is "2nd Target: Love Sick" and was released on November 17, 1999. The third is "3rd Target: Love Pleasure" and was released on December 15, 1999. There is another CD, "A Legend of a Vampire" that uses the same voice cast as the Wink dramas, though it doesn't relate to the manga. This CD was released in 2001. The plot centers around Daisuke's alter ego, Dark, being a vampire. Krad, who wasn't in the Wink dramas, also made an appearance in this CD.

There were also two drama CDs released after the anime titled "Sweet" and "Cute". These CDs use the anime voice actors and are based on the anime with events taking place just before its ending. They also include parodies of scenes in the anime.

=== Novels ===
Three novels were released in Japan between March and October 2000 and were re-released in September 2001. The script-title=ja:s are Ningyo no Namida (人魚の涙; lit. 'Mermaid's Tears'), Yuki no Joō (雪の女王; lit. 'Snow Queen'), and Garasu no Kutsuri (硝子の靴; lit. 'Glass Shoes'). Although there was an ad for them left in Tokyopop's translation of the fourth manga volume, they have not been licensed, so little is known about them.

=== Radio program ===
A series of seven broadcasts aired Japan in 2005 called Decade on Net: Radio D.N.Angel. It was hosted by Miyu Irino and Akira Ishida, who voiced Daisuke Niwa and Satoshi Hiwatari, respectively.

== Reception ==
By January 2021, the manga had over 4.5 million copies in circulation, including physical and digital copies.
