= List of sports anime and manga =

This is a list of sports anime, manga, OVAs, ONAs, and films.

Year	Title	Creator(s)	Sport	Original medium	Ref.
1987	1 pound Gospel	Rumiko Takahashi	Boxing	Manga	
2021	1F no Kishi (Knight in 1 Frame)	Hollow Takeuchi	Fencing	Manga	
2015	2.43: Seiin High School Boys Volleyball Team	Yukako Kabei	Volleyball	Light novel	
1990	3rd St.	Souichi Moto	Auto racing	Manga	
2010	6000 (The Deep Sea of Madness)	Nokuto Koike	Scuba diving	Manga	
2006	81diver	Yokusaru Shibata	Shogi	Manga	
2008	88	Hiromi Namiki	Ice hockey	Manga	
1991	801 T.T.S. Airbats	Shimizu Toshimitsu	Aeroplane aerobatics	Manga	
1988	Aah! Harimanada	Kei Sadayasu	Sumo	Manga	
2021	A-bout! Surf	Masa Ichikawa	Surfing	Manga	
1973	Abu-san	Shinji Mizushima	Baseball	Manga	
2006	Ace of Diamond	Yuji Terajima	Baseball	Manga	
2018	Aerover	Pictionary Art Factory	Mecha, Drone flying (Aerover Championship)	Anime	
2013	After School Dice Club	Hirō Nakamichi	Board games	Manga	
2011	Again!!	Mitsurō Kubo	Cheerleading (Ōendan)	Manga	
2006	Ah! Classic Bikers	Kenichirou Iwahashi, Rintaro Asashi	Motorcycle racing	Manga	
2003	Ahiru no Sora	Takeshi Hinata	Basketball	Manga	
2004	Aiki	Isutoshi	Martial arts	Manga	
1973	Aim for the Ace!	Sumika Yamamoto	Tennis	Manga	
2002	Air Gear	Oh! great	Inline skating (Air Treking)	Manga	
1996	Air Master	Yokusaru Shibata	Martial arts, Street fighting	Manga	
1981	Aitsu to Lullaby	Michiharu Kusunoki	Street racing, Motorcycle racing	Manga	
1991	Akagi (Akagi: The Genius Who Descended into Darkness)	Nobuyuki Fukumoto	Mahjong	Manga	
1970	Akakichi no Eleven	Ikki Kajiwara, Mitsuyoshi Sonoda	Association football	Manga	
1977	Akai Pegasus	Motoka Murakami	Auto racing (F1)	Manga	
2013	Akichi Asobi: Playground	Ryosuke Oshiro & Tokyo University of the Arts	Sandlot games	Anime	
1996	Akira no Meisei (Akira no Myoujou)	Michitsuna Takahashi, Souichi Moto	Running	Manga	
2021	Alice Gear Aegis: Heart Pounding! Actress Packed Mermaid Grand Prix!	Pyramid	M-1 Tag Team	Mobile game	
2020	All Free!: Zettai! Musabetsu-kyuu Chousen Joshi Den	Terubou Aono	Judo	Manga	
2008	All-Rounder Meguru	Hiroki Endo	Martial arts (MMA, Shoot wrestling)	Manga	
2012	All Out!!	Shiori Amase	Rugby union	Manga	
2008	Amanchu!	Kozue Amano	Scuba diving	Manga	
1999	Angelic Layer	Clamp	Plamo battles (Angelic Layer)	Manga	
1999	Angels in the Court	Pinpai	Volleyball	Video game	
2016	Anima Yell!	Tsukasa Unohana	Cheerleading	Manga	
1968	Animal 1	Noboru Kawasaki	Amateur wrestling	Manga	
1928	Animal Olympic Games	Yasuji Murata	Various	Short film	
2015	Ani Tore! EX (Anime de Training EX)	Daisuke Ishibashi	Calisthenics	Anime	
2017	Animation x Paralympic		Parasports	Anime	
2015	Aoashi	Yūgo Kobayashi, Naohiko Ueno	Association football	Manga	
2013	Aoharu × Machinegun	Naoe	Airsoft	Manga	
2005	Aoi Kiseki	Miko Mitsuki	Swimming	Manga	
2014	Aokana - Four Rhythms Across the Blue	Sprite	Flying Circus (Anti-gravity shoes racing)	Visual novel	
1970	Apache Baseball Team (Apache Yakyuugun)	Kobako Hanato, Sachio Umemoto	Baseball	Manga	
2020	Appare-Ranman!	Masakazu Hashimoto	Auto racing, Steampunk	Anime	
2009	Arachnid	Shinya Murata, Shinsen Ifuji	Martial arts	Manga	
1998	Arcade Gamer Fubuki	Mine Yoshizaki	Arcade games	Manga	
1977	Arrow Emblem: Hawk of the Grand Prix	Rintaro	Auto racing (F1)	Anime	
1993	Art of Fighting	Hiroshi Fukutomi, Nobuaki Kishima, Kazunori Iwakura	Martial arts	Video game	
2011	Asahinagu	Ai Kozaki	Naginata	Manga	
1995	Ashen Victor	Yukito Kishiro	Inline skating (Motorball (Note: A fictional sport appearing in Battle Angel Alita by Yukito Kishiro.))	Manga	
1992	Ashita e Free Kick	Ashi Productions	Association football	Anime	
1976	Ashita e Kick-off	Ikki Kajiwara	American football	Manga	
1968	Ashita no Joe	Asao Takamori, Tetsuya Chiba	Boxing	Manga	
1980	Ashita Tenki ni Naare	Tetsuya Chiba	Golf	Manga	
1968	Attack No. 1	Chikako Urano	Volleyball	Manga	
1977	Attack on Tomorrow	Fumio Kurokawa	Volleyball	Anime	
1984	Attacker You!	Jun Makimura, Shizuo Koizumi	Volleyball	Manga	
2020	Auto Boy - Carl from Mobile Land		Auto driving, Mecha	Manga/Anime	
1997	Ayane's High Kick	Isao Shizuya	Kickboxing	Anime	
1970	Ayu	Takao Yaguchi	Fishing	Manga	
1994	Azumi	Yuu Koyama	Martial arts	Manga	
2007	Baka and Test	Kenji Inoue, Yui Haga	Game (Summoner Test Wars)	Light novel	
2018	Bakutsuri Bar Hunter	Bandai	Fictional fishing sport	Anime	
2018	Barangay 143	Katski Flores	Basketball, Streetball	Anime	
1999	Bass Master Ranmaru	Taiga Takahashi, Yoshiaki Shimojo	Fishing sport	Manga	
1996	Battle Arena Toshinden	Tamsoft	Martial arts	Video game	
2018	Batuque	Toshio Sako	Capoeira	Manga	
2011	B-Daman Crossfire		Mecha, B-Daman battles		
2007	Baby Steps	Hikaru Katsuki	Tennis	Manga	
2009	Bachibachi	Takahiro Satou	Sumo	Manga	
2021	Backflip!! (Bakuten!!)	Toshimasa Kuroyanagi, Toshizo Nemoto	Rhythmic gymnastics	Anime	
2008	Badminton Girl	Mari Asabuki	Badminton	Manga	
2008	BaggataWay	Iroha Kohinata	Lacrosse	Manga	
2024	Baki Hanma VS Kengan Ashura	Keisuke Itagaki	Martial arts		
1991	Baki the Grappler	Keisuke Itagaki	Martial arts	Manga	
2011	Bakuon!!	Mimana Orimoto	Motorcycle racing	Manga	
2002	Bakuon Rettou	Tsutomu Takahashi	Motorcycle driving	Manga	
1994	Bakusō Kyōdai Let's & Go!!	Tetsuhiro Koshita	Car model racing	Manga	
2006	BakéGyamon	Mitsuhisa Tamura, Kazuhiro Fujita	Games	Manga	
2004	Bamboo Blade	Masahiro Totsuka, Aguri Igarashi	Kendo	Manga	
2022	Ban-Ō	Toshiya Watabiki, Garaku Akinai	Shogi	Manga	
1983	Bari Bari Densetsu	Shuichi Shigeno	Street racing, Motorcycle racing	Manga	
2009	Basquash!	Shōji Kawamori, Thomas Romain	Mecha basketball	Anime	
1986	Bataashi Kingyo	Minetarō Mochizuki	Swimming	Manga	
1997	Battle Athletes		Various (Daiundoukai)	Anime or Manga	
2004	Battle Club	Yuji Shiozaki	Amateur wrestling	Manga	
2007	The Battle of Genryu: Origin	Shouko Fukaki	Martial arts	Manga	
1986	Battle Royal High School	Shin'ichi Kuruma	Martial arts	Manga	
2015	Battle Studies	Nakibokuro	Baseball	Manga	
1985	B.B.	Osamu Ishiwata	Boxing	Manga	
1991	B.B. Fish (Blue Butterfly Fish)	Shō Kitagawa	Freediving	Manga	
2007	Beach Stars	Masahiro Morio	Beach volleyball	Manga	
1986	Beat Shot!!	Satoshi Ikezawa	Golf	Manga	
1983	Be-Bop High School	Kazuhiro Kiuchi	Martial arts	Manga	
2021	Benihi no Ulti	Naoto Kanno	Ultimate frisbee	Manga	
2008	Ben-To	Asaura, Kaito Shibano	Martial arts (Bento brawls)	Light novel	
2018	Best 8+	Yeong-chan	Rowing	Manga	
2015	Best Blue	Masahiro Hirakata	Swimming	Manga	
2017	Between the Sky and Sea	Oji Hiroi, Takashi Yamada	Fictional fishing (Space fishing)	Video game	
2008	Beyblade	Takao Aoki	Mecha, Beyblading	Manga	
2003	Big Windup!	Asa Higuchi	Baseball	Manga	
2004	Bikini!	Wataru Mizukami	Swimming	Manga	
2022	Billion Racer	Taiga Tada	Motorcycle racing, Gambling	Manga	
2016	Bird: Black Market	Kazutoshi Yamane, Hiromi Aoyama	Mahjong	Manga	
2022	Birdie Wing: Golf Girls' Story	Takayuki Inagaki	Golf	Anime	
2015	Black-Box	Tsutomu Takahashi	Boxing	Manga	
2018	Blade Girl: The One-Legged Runner	Narumi Shigematsu	Parasport (Blade running)	Manga	
2008	Blassreiter	Yasuko Kobayashi, Gen Urobuchi, Ichirō Itano	Motorcycle driving, Mecha	Anime	
1992	Blaster Knuckle	Shizuya Wazarai	Boxing	Manga	
1983	Blazing Transfer Student	Kazuhiko Shimamoto	Boxing	Manga	
2010	Blood Diver Ringo and the Fishbowl Man	Youichi Abe	Fictional diving (Blood diving)	Manga	
2021	Blue Box	Kouji Miura	Badminton	Manga	
2018	Blue Lock	Muneyuki Kaneshiro, Yusuke Nomura	Association football	Manga	
2018	Blue Striker	Yokusaru Shibata, Makoto Sawa	Martial arts	Manga	
2025	Blue Ursus	Yabako Sandrovich, Doi Naha	Martial arts, Wrestling	Manga	
2024	Bodokan! ~Onna, Shujin Doushi, Kangoku de Nani mo Okoranai Hazu ga Naku~	Wanai Warugi, Shouichi Taguchi	Board games	Manga	
2019	Boku × Star (Boxster)	Keisuke Hiya	Martial arts	Manga	
2020	Bukuro Kicks	Ikka Matsuki	Parasport (Blind soccer)	Manga	
1997	Bowling King	Tong Ai	Bowling	Manga	
	Brasaka Bravo!! (BRAVO Blind Soccer)	Yōichi Takahashi	Parasport (Blind soccer)	Manga	
1992	Break-Age	Zhiemay Batow	Mecha, Virtual puppet battles	Manga	
2020	Breakers		Parasports	Anime	
1987	Break Shot	Takeshi Maekawa	Billiards	Manga	
2022	Bubble	Gen Urobuchi, Takeshi Obata	Parkour	Anime	
1987	Bucchigiri	Yuu Nakahara	Baseball	Manga	
2021	Build Divide	Homura Kawamoto, Hikaru Muno, Yoriko Tomita	Card game (Build Divide)	Anime	
2015	Burning Kabaddi	Hajime Musashino	Kabaddi	Manga	
1999	Bus Gamer	Kazuya Minekura	Business game	Manga	
2012	Busou Shinki Moon Angel	Konami	Plamo battles (Shinki battles)	Action figures	
1997	Buzzer Beater	Takehiko Inoue	Basketball	Manga	
2011	[C] CONTROL - The Money and Soul of Possibility	Noboru Takagi	Business game (Deals)	Anime	
2020	Cap Kakumei Bottleman	Gaina	Bottle Battle	Anime	
2005	Capeta	Masahito Soda	Kart racing	Manga	
1981	Captain Tsubasa	Yōichi Takahashi	Association football	Manga	
2020	The Catcher in the Ballpark!	Tatsurō Suga	Baseball	Manga	
2012	Chōsoku Henkei Gyrozetter	Square Enix	Auto driving, Mecha	Arcade game/Anime	
2016	Cheating Craft	Takamitsu Kouno	Extreme cheating	Anime	
2011	Cheer Boys!!	Ryō Asai	Cheerleading	Novel	
1992	Cherry	Noboru Takahashi	Professional wrestling	Manga	
2024	Chihaya Re:Start!	Hollow Takeuchi	Running	Manga	
2007	Chihayafuru	Yuki Suetsugu	Card game (competitive Karuta)	Manga	
2014	Chio's School Road	Tadataka Kawasaki	Various, Parkour	Manga	
1959	Chronicles of a Ninja's Military Accomplishments (Ninja Bugeichou)	Sanpei Shirato	Martial arts	Manga	
2013	Chrono Monochrome	Jingetsu Isomi	Chess	Manga	
2003	Cinderella Nine		Baseball, Cricket		
2022	Cipher Academy	Nisio Isin, Yūji Iwasaki	Puzzle solving (Cryptography, Cipher-based battles)	Manga	
2018	Circlet Princess	DMM Games	Circlet Bout	Video game	
2018	Circuit Angel: Resolving Starting Grid	Mami Watanabe, Toi Tsukumo, Chūichi Iguchi	Motorcycle racing	Anime	
1974	The Circuit Wolf	Satoshi Ikezawa	Auto racing	Manga	
2007	The Climber	Shin-ichi Sakamoto, Yoshio Nabeta, Hiroshi Takano	Rock climbing	Manga	
	CMFU Academy: King of Billiards		Billiards	Novel	
	CMFU Academy: Shenshi Ji Jijian		Fencing	Novel	
2021	The Coin Manga	bon_h	Arcade games	Manga	
2004	Countach	Haruto Umezawa	Auto racing	Manga	
2016	Crane Game Girls		Crane game	Anime	
2003	Crimson Hero	Mitsuba Takanashi	Volleyball	Manga	
2012	Cross Game	Mitsuru Adachi	Baseball	Manga	
2012	Cross Manage	KAITO	Lacrosse	Manga	
2012	Crow in the Starry Sky	Satoshi Morie	Go	Manga	
2001	Crush Gear Turbo	Hajime Yatate, Fuyunori Gobu, Hiroaki Kitajima	Car model battles (Crush Gear)	Anime	
1986	Crying Freeman	Kazuo Koike, Ryoichi Ikegami	Martial arts	Manga	
1971	Cycle Yarou	Toshio Shouji	Cycling	Manga	
1998	D4 Princess	Shotaro Harada	Panzer fights	Manga	
2002	Daigunder (Bakuto Sengen Daigunder)	Shinzō Fujita	Military game, Mecha	Anime	
1995	Dan Doh!!	Nobuhiro Sakata	Golf	Manga	
2015	Dance Dance Danseur	George Asakura	Dance (Ballet)	Manga	
2012	Dansui!	Tatsuya Kiuchi	Swimming	Manga	
2026	Dark Machine	Team Carbuncle	eSports	Manga	
2006	Dash!	Isaku Natsume	Cheerleading	Novel	
1979	Dash Kappei	Noboru Rokuda	Basketball	Manga	
1987	Dash! Yonkuro	Zaurus Tokuda	Car model racing	Manga	
2023	Dave the Diver	Shinnosuke Tsuchida	Scuba diving	Video game	
2013	Days	Yasuda Tsuyoshi	Association football	Manga	
2003	Dead or Alive: Xtreme Beach Volleyball Comic Anthology		Beach volleyball	Video game	
1989	Dear Boys	Hiroki Yagami	Basketball	Manga	
2015 (2013)	Death Parade (Death Billiards)	Yuzuru Tachikawa	Various	Anime	
1994	Denju - Heisei Heta Koroshi	Tomoshi Kuga, Souichi Moto	Gambling, Mahjong	Manga	
1989	Desupai (Death Pie)	Kazuhiko Shimamoto	Gambling, Mahjong	Manga	
2012	Dethrone	Takuya Tashiro	Martial arts	Manga	
1979	Diary of a Fishing Fool (The Daily Report of a Crazy Fisherman)	Jūzō Yamasaki, Kenichi Kitami	Fishing sport	Manga	
2017	Diary of Our Days at the Breakwater	Yasuyuki Kosaka	Fishing	Manga	
2025	Dig It	Yoshidamaru	Volleyball	Manga	
2024	Dimension Wave	Aneko Yusagi, Ichiko Kameyoshi	Fishing	Light novel	
2007	Dive!!	Eto Mori, Masahiro Ikeno	Diving	Novel	
2017	Dive!!	Eto Mori, Ruzuru Akashiba	Diving	Novel	
2014	Do You Like Big Girls?	Goro Aizome	Volleyball	Manga	
2011	Dog Days	Masaki Tsuzuki	Military game, Isekai	Anime	
2023	Dogsred	Satoru Noda	Ice hockey	Manga	
1972	Dokaben	Shinji Mizushima	Baseball	Manga	
2017	Doll-Kara	Hanamura, Kazuyoshi Ishii, Kei Ryuuzouji	Martial arts	Manga	
2019	Don't Call Us a Junk Game!	Nioshi Noa, Omochisan	Video game	Manga	
2016	Don't Like This	Kaori Tsurutani	Fishing	Manga	
2010	Donten Prism Solar Car	Yusuke Murata, Yasuo Ootagaki	Auto racing	Manga	
2012	Doreiku	Shinichi Okada, Hiroto Ōishi	SCM game	Novel	
1994	Double Hard	Naoki Konno	Martial arts	Manga	
2001	Dragon Drive	Kenichi Sakura	Dragon battles, Video game, Card game	Manga	
1993	Dragon League	Takashiro Saeki	Association football (Anthropomorphic)	Manga	
2012	Dragons Rioting	Tsuyoshi Watanabe	Martial arts	Manga	
2008	Dramatical Murder	Nitro+chiral, Touko Machida, Kabura Fuchii	Games (Rib, Rhyme)	Visual novel	
2018	Dricam!!	Yu Chiba	Auto racing (Drifting)	Manga	
2008	Drive-a-Live	Kunihiko Nakai	Street racing, Video game	Manga	
2015	Duel!	Akira Aoi	Fencing	Manga	
1994	Dynamite Peach	Katsu Aki	Professional wrestling	Manga	
1984	Eiji	Hisashi Eguchi	Boxing	Manga	
2011	Encouragement of Climb	Shiro	Mountaineering	Manga	
1998	End of the Century Female: Silver	Maki Hisao, Takemoto Saburo	Professional wrestling	Manga	
2024	Enter The Garden	Azuki, Dentsu	Skateboarding	Anime	
2011	Ever Green	Yuyuko Takemiya, Akira Kasukabe	Swimming	Manga	
2005	Evil Heart	Tomo Taketomi	Aikido	Manga	
2000	éX-Driver	Kōsuke Fujishima	Street racing	Anime	
2022	Extreme Hearts	Masaki Tsuzuki	Various (Hyper Sports)	Anime	
2002	Eyeshield 21	Riichiro Inagaki, Yusuke Murata	American football	Manga	
1985	F	Noboru Rokuda	Auto racing (F1)	Manga	
2003	F-Zero: GP Legend	Nintendo, Akiyoshi Sakai	Auto racing, Mecha	Video game	
1985	Famicom Rocky (NES Rocky)	Asai Motoyuki	Video games	Manga	
2022	Fanfare of Adolescence		Horse racing	Anime	
2016	Farewell, My Dear Cramer	Naoshi Arakawa	Association football	Manga	
1992	Fatal Fury: Legend of the Hungry Wolf	Takashi Yamada, Masami Ōbari	Martial arts	Video game	
1994	Fatal Fury: The Motion Picture	Takashi Yamada, Masami Ōbari	Martial arts	Video game	
1993	Fatal Fury 2: The New Battle	Takashi Yamada, Masami Ōbari	Martial arts	Video game	
2017	Fight League: Gear Gadget Generators	XFLAG	Mecha, Fight League	Video game	
1982	Fight!! Ramenman (Lomien Man)	Yudetamago	Martial arts	Manga	
2002	Fighting Beauty Wulong	Yūgo Ishikawa	Martial arts	Manga	
1992	Fighting Unlimited Big Girl Tarmy	Koichi Yamada	Professional wrestling	Manga	
2008	Fisherman Nagare (Tsuriya Nagare)	Kenjirou Takeshita	Fishing	Manga	
1973	Fisherman Sanpei	Takao Yaguchi	Fishing sport	Manga	
1973	Fishing Fools (Tsuribakatachi)	Takao Yaguchi	Fishing sport	Manga	
1977	Flap Your Wings, Taroumaru! (Habatake! Taroumaru)	Takao Yaguchi	Falconry	Manga	
2005	Flat Out	Keichiro Shinmura	Auto racing	Manga	
1978	Football Hawk	Noboru Kawasaki	American football	Manga	
2009	Football Nation	Yuki Otake	Association football	Manga	
2002	Forza! Hidemaru	Hideo Takayashiki	Association football	Anime	
2016	Frame Arms Girl	Kotobukiya, Deko Akao	Plamo battles (Sessions battles)	Manga	
2013	Free!	Kōji Ōji	Swimming	Light novel	
2024	Friday Night Board Games and You	Roku Kuroto	Board games	Manga	
2010	Fudekage (Shura no Mon: Fudekage)	Masatoshi Kawahara, Hiroyuki Tobinaga	Association football	Manga	
2004	Full Contact (aka Furu-Kon or FL-CN)	Kitahama Kabuto, Minazuki Shinobu	Karate	Manga	
2005	Full Spec	Taro Sekiguchi	Auto racing	Manga	
2025	Futei no Olympia	Hirohito Iwakuni	Weightlifting, Calisthenics	Manga	
1991	Future GPX Cyber Formula	Hajime Yatate, Hiroyuki Hoshiyama	Auto racing (Cyber Formula)	Anime	
1982	Fūma no Kojirō	Masami Kurumada	Martial arts	Manga	
2022	Futsal Boys!!!!!		Futsal	Anime	
2010	G	Hitotsuki Yamada	Auto racing (F1)	Manga	
2018	Gakuen Basara: Samurai High School		Various	Video game	
2009	Gamaran	Yousuke Nakamaru	Martial arts	Manga	
2007	Gamble!, Gambler!	Mitsuru Kaga	Gambling	Manga	
2007	Gamble Fish	Hiromi Aoyama, Kazutoshi Yamane	Gambling, Strategy	Manga	
2007	Gambling Emperor Legend Zero (Tobaku Haouden Rei)	Nobuyuki Fukumoto	Gambling	Manga	
1991	Gambling Prince Arashi	Tooru Nakajima	Gambling	Manga	
2015	Gamers!	Sekina Aoi, Saboten	Video games	Light novel	
2019	Gaming Ojou-sama	Dai@Nani, Maru Masao, Yoshio Mokumoku	Video games	Web manga	
1994	Ganba! Fly High (Gambalist! Shun)	Shinji Morisue, Hiroyuki Kikuta	Gymnastics	Manga	
1976	Ganbare Genki	Yū Koyama	Boxing	Manga	
1985	Ganbare, Kickers! (Fight, Kickers!)	Noriaki Nagai	Association football	Manga	
1978	Ganbare!! Tabuchi-kun!!	Hisaichi Ishii	Baseball	Manga	
1996	Ganbatte Ikimasshoi	Yoshiko Shikimura	Rowing	Novel	
2018	Garage Paradise	Nishikaze	Auto racing	Manga	
1989	Garōden	Baku Yumemakura, Itagaki Keisuke, Jiro Taniguchi	Martial arts	Novel	
2021	Gasoline	Yazu	Motorcycle racing	Manga (One shot)	
1977	Gekisō! Ruben Kaiser	Koji Ishihara	Auto racing	Manga	
2007	Giant Killing	Masaya Tsunamoto, Tsujitomo	Association football	Manga	
2014	Gigant Big-Shot Tsukasa	Toru Hosokawa	Gigant Shooter	Anime	
1992	Gin to Kin	Nobuyuki Fukumoto	Gambling	Manga	
2003	Ginban Kaleidoscope	Rei Kaibara, Hiro Suzuhira	Figure skating	Light novel	
2014	Ginpaku no Paladin - Seikishi	Keisuke Oka	Fencing	Manga	
1999	Girl Got Game	Shizuru Seino	Basketball	Manga	
2012	Girls und Panzer		Military game, Mecha		
2003	Glaucos	Akio Tanaka	Freediving	Manga	
1991	Go!! Southern Ice Hockey Club	Kōji Kumeta	Ice hockey	Manga	
2007	Go! Tenba Cheerleaders	Toshinori Sogabe	Cheerleading	Manga	
1994	Goal FH		Association football	Anime	
1997	Go Da Gun	Katakura Masanori	Martial arts	Manga	
2013	Go Go Dynamites	Sadaji Koike	Cheerleading	Manga	
1986	Go-Q-Choji Ikkiman	Toei Animation	Baseball (Battle ball)	Anime	
1988	Goddamn	Kaoru Shintani	Auto racing (Rally)	Manga	
2017	The Goddess in Tokiwa Bowl	Hiroki Yagami	Bowling	Manga	
2020	Gods' Games We Play	Kei Sazane, Toiro Tomose	Games (Gods' Games)	Novel	
2018	Golden Sakura	Sayaka Okada, Kazuo Maekawa	Mahjong	Manga	
1988	Gorillaman	Harold Sakuishi	Martial arts	Manga	
1990	GP Boy	Kunihiko Akai, Hirohisa Onikubo	Auto racing (F1)	Manga	
2019	Granbelm	Jukki Hanada	Mecha, Robot battles	Anime	
1996	Grander Musashi (Super Fishing Grander Musashi)	Takashi Teshirogi	Fishing sport	Manga	
1994	Green Meadow King	Tsunomaru	Horse racing	Manga	
2026	Grow Up Show: Sunflower Circus	Kanta Kamei, Takeshi Kikuchi	Circus	Anime	
2015	Guess, Kijou Mae	Nishi Kouhei	Horse racing	Manga	
2021	Gundam Breaker Battlogue		Plamo battles (Gunpla battles)	Anime	
2018	Gundam Build Divers	Noboru Kimura	Plamo battles (Gunpla battles), Video game	Anime	
2013	Gundam Build Fighters	Yōsuke Kuroda	Plamo battles (Gunpla battles)	Anime	
2023	Gundam Build Metaverse	Hajime Yatate, Yoshiyuki Tomino, Noboru Kimura	Video game, Mecha, Gunpla battles	Anime	
2010	Gurazeni	Yūji Moritaka, Keiji Adachi	Baseball	Manga	
2020	The Gymnastics Samurai (Taisou Zamurai)		Gymnastics	Anime	
1992	H2	Mitsuru Adachi	Baseball	Manga	
2014	Haiji to Yamao (Mountain Cottage)	Natsumi Ando	Mountaineering	Manga	
2012	Haikyu!!	Haruichi Furudate	Volleyball	Manga	
1989	Hajime no Ippo	George Morikawa	Boxing	Manga	
1991	Hakaiou Noritaka!	Murata Hideo, Takashi Hamori	Thai boxing	Manga	
1990	Hakkeyoi	Nami Taro, Maekawa Takeshi	Sumo	Manga	
1996	Hana-Kimi	Hisaya Nakajo	Track and field	Manga	
2006	Hand's	Yuuichi Itakura	Handball	Manga	
2021	Hands Off: Sawaranaide Kotesashi-kun	Takuya Shinjō	Athletics	Manga	
2013	Hanebado!	Kōsuke Hamada	Badminton	Manga	
2012	Hantsu × Trash	Hiyoko Kobayashi	Water polo	Manga	
1993	Happy!	Naoki Urasawa	Tennis	Manga	
1994	Harlem Beat (Rebound)	Yuriko Nishiyama	Basketball, Streetball	Manga	
2015	Harukana Receive	Jizai Nyoi	Beach volleyball	Manga	
1992	Harukanaru Ring	Keigo Nakamura	Professional wrestling	Manga	
2017	Hawk Master, It's Hunting Time!	Gomakichi	Falconry	Manga	
2016	Hayame Blast Gear	Yuusuke Takeyama	Cycling	Manga	
1992	Hayate	Jun Fudou	Auto racing (F1)	Manga	
2003	Hayate × Blade	Shizuru Hayashiya	Martial arts	Manga	
1988	Heavy	Motoka Murakami	Boxing	Manga	
2021	Hell's Boat 136	Jirou Maeda	Martial arts, Vovinam	Manga	
2014	Hero Bank	Sega	Mecha, Hero battle	Video game	
2016	Heybot!	Bandai	Mecha, Bokya battle	Anime	
2010	High Score Girl	Rensuke Oshikiri	Arcade games	Manga	
2013	High Speed! Free! Starting Days	Koji Oji	Swimming	Light novel	
2024	Highspeed Etoile	Takamitsu Kōno	Auto racing (NEX Racing)	Anime	
2020	Highway Wolf (Koudou Wolf)	Takashi Noguchi	Street racing	Manga	
1985	Hikari no Densetsu	Izumi Aso	Rhythmic gymnastics	Manga	
1999	Hikaru no Go	Yumi Hotta, Takeshi Obata	Go	Manga	
2014	Hinomaru Sumo	Kawada	Sumo	Manga	
2026	Hishikai Sentou Iron Recce	Masahito Soda, Tomiyama sKuro	Auto racing (Rally)	Manga	
2013	Hyoukyuu Hime × Tokiwagi Kantoku no Kajou na Aijou	Haruka Ono	Ice hockey	Manga	
2016	Hitori no Shita: The Outcast	Dong Man Tang, Mi Er, Mitsuo Mori	Martial arts	Webcomic	
2000	Holyland	Kouji Mori	Martial arts, Street fighting	Manga	
1989	Honō no Tōkyūji: Dodge Danpei	Tetsuhiro Koshita	Dodgeball	Manga	
2019	Hoshiai no Sora		Tennis	Anime	
2024	Hotchpotch Punch	Aki Saga, Genki Katsuragi	Martial arts (MMA)	Manga	
2016	Houkago Shoujo Bout (After School Girls Bout)	Kakuji Fujita	Martial arts	Manga	
2016	How Heavy Are the Dumbbells You Lift?	Yabako Sandrovich, MAAM	Weightlifting	Manga	
2002	Hungry Heart: Wild Striker	Yōichi Takahashi	Association football	Manga	
1995	Hustle	Makoto Isshiki	Professional wrestling	Manga	
2018	Hyakuemu / Hyaku M.	Uoto	Running	Manga	
1995	I'll	Hiroyuki Asada	Basketball	Manga	
2008	I-Revo (Ice Revolution)	Youhei Takemura, Aya Tsutsumi	Figure skating	Manga	
2005	Idaten Jump	Toshihiro Fujiwara	Cycling (MTB)	Manga	
2002	Idejuu!	Taishi Mori	Judo	Manga	
1952	Igaguri-kun	Eiichi Fukui	Judo	Manga	
2003	IGPX: Immortal Grand Prix	Production I.G, Cartoon Network	Mecha racing and battles	Anime	
2000	Ikki Tousen (Battle Vixens)	Yuji Shiozaki	Martial arts	Manga	
1975	Ikkyū-san (Highschool Baseball Ninja)	Shinji Mizushima	Baseball	Manga	
2011	Ikkyuu	Hashimoto Eiji	Martial arts, Street fighting, Gambling	Manga	
2020	In Another World where Baseball is War, a High School Ace Player will Save a Weak Nation	Riku Misora, Takuya Nishida	Baseball	Manga	
2008	Inazuma Eleven	Level-5	Association football	Video game	
1995	Initial D	Shuichi Shigeno	Street racing	Manga	
2000	Inu Neko Jump!	Mitsuru Hattori	Long jump	Manga	
1999	IO	Minato Koio	Scuba diving	Manga	
2018	Ippon Again!	Yu Muraoka	Judo	Manga	
2021	Irregulars	Naoki Matsumoto	Baseball	Manga	
2009	Isshoni Training: Training with Hinako	Muneshige Nakagawa	Calisthenics	Anime	
2017	Iwa-Kakeru! -Climbing Girls-	Ryūdai Ishizaka	Rock climbing (Bouldering)	Manga	
1994	Jaja Uma Grooming Up!	Masami Yuki	Horse racing	Manga	
2010	Jang Kubi	Tomoshi Kuga, Rintarou Asahi	Mahjong	Manga	
2025	Jin Kakutou Haouden	Yuusuke Utsumi	Martial arts, Street fighting	Manga	
2016	JJM: Joshi Judou-bu Monogatari	Yuuko Emoto, Makoto Kobayashi	Judo	Manga	
2003	Joe vs. Joe (Futari no Joe)	Hisao Maki	Boxing	Anime	
1999	Jubei-chan: The Ninja Girl	Akitaro Daichi	Martial arts	Anime	
1961	Judo Boy	Tatsuo Yoshida, Ippei Kuri, Yutaka Arai	Judo	Manga	
1972	Judo Sanka	Hiroshi Kaizuka	Judo	Manga	
1942	Judo Story (Sanshiro Sugata)	Tsuneo Tomita	Judo	Novel	
1985	Judo-bu Monogatari	Makoto Kobayashi	Judo	Manga	
2005	Jump! ~Sitting Volleyball Story~	Kaoru Morishita	Parasport (Sitting volleyball)	Manga	
2014	Juudouzu	Shinsuke Kondou	Judo	Manga	
2003	Kage Kara Mamoru!	Taro Achi, Sai Madara	Martial arts	Light novel	
1981	Kaidou Racer Go	Satoshi Ikezawa	Motorcycle racing	Manga	
1996	Kaiji (Gambling Apocalypse: Kaiji)	Nobuyuki Fukumoto	Gambling	Manga	
2005	Kakurenbo: Hide & Seek	Shuhei Morita	Hide-and-seek	Anime	
2008	Kamome☆Chance	Yukio Tamai	Cycling	Manga	
2019	Kandagawa Jet Girls		Jet Ski racing (Jet Racing)	Anime	
1971	Karate Master (A Karate-Crazy Life)	Ikki Kajiwara, Jirō Tsunoda, Jōya Kagemaru	Karate	Manga	
2000	Karate Shoukoushi Kohinata Minoru	Yasushi Baba	Karate	Manga	
2017	Katana Maidens: Toji No Miko	Sakae Saito	Martial arts	Manga	
2007	Katanagatari	Nisio Isin, Take	Martial arts	Light novel	
2018	Kawasemi-san no Tsuri Gohan (Kawasemi's Fishing and Cooking)	Kiyomasa Masanoshita	Fishing	Manga	
1996	Kazagake Shoujogumi!	Tokio Kazuka	Motorcycle racing, Flying motorcycles	Manga	
1989	Kaze no Sylphid	Yukihisa Motoshima	Horse racing	Manga	
1985	Kaze wo Nuke!	Motoka Murakami	Motorcycle racing (Motocross)	Manga	
2006	Kämpfer	Toshihiko Tsukiji, Senmu	Martial arts	Light novel	
2012	Keijo!!!!!!!!	Daichi Sorayomi	Fictional wrestling (Keijo)	Manga	
2012	Kengan Ashura	Yabako Sandrovich	Martial arts	Manga	
2012	Kenji	Ryuchi Matsuda, Yoshihide Fujiwara	Martial arts (Bajiquan and other Chinese martial arts)	Manga	
2013	Kenka Kagyou (Fight Business)	Yasuaki Kita	Martial arts	Manga	
2005	Kenka Shōbai (Fight Shop)	Yasuaki Kita	Martial arts	Manga	
2005	Kenkō Zenrakei Suieibu Umishō	Mitsuru Hattori	Swimming	Manga	
1987	Kentoushi	Kei Tsukasa	Boxing	Manga	
2014	Keppeki Danshi! Aoyama-kun	Taku Sakamoto	Association football	Manga	
2013	Kick-Heart	Masaaki Yuasa	Professional wrestling	Anime	
1969	Kick no Oni (The Demon of Kickboxing)	Ikki Kajiwara, Kentaro Nakajou	Kickboxing	Manga	
1970	Kick the Clouds Away!	Maki Hisao, Shoji Toshio	Association football, Martial arts	Manga	
2002	King	Keichiro Shinmura	Street racing	Manga	
2008	King Golf	Ken Sasaki	Golf	Manga	
2015	King of Prism	Avex Pictures	Prism show (Note: A fictional sport in the Pretty Rhythm series that combines elements of figure skating and dance. Also referred to as "Prism Dance Skate" in the 2010 Pretty Rhythm manga.)	Anime	
1978	Kinnikuman	Yudetamago	Professional wrestling	Manga	
1990	Kirin	Shohei Harumoto	Street racing (Motorcycles)	Manga	
1992	Kizuna: Bonds of Love	Kazuma Kodaka	Kendo	Manga	
2006	The Knight in the Area	Shin Kibayashi, Kaya Tsukiyama	Association football	Manga	
2022	Knuckle Knuckle	Taisei Yamagishi	Martial arts	Manga	
2008	Koihime†Musou: Doki☆Otome darake no Sangokushi Engi	BaseSon, Yayoi Hiduki	Martial arts	Visual novel	
2013	Korekara Combat	Masahiro Morio	Military game	Manga	
2015	Kotera-san climbs!	Coffee	Rock climbing (Bouldering)	Manga	
2008	Kuroko's Basketball	Tadatoshi Fujimaki	Basketball	Manga	
2016	Koukakuka Aikyou Sae: Kyou no Ichiban	Fumino Hayashi	Sumo (female)	Manga	
1996	Kyoutei Shoujo (Speedboat Girl)	Yasuhiro Koizumi	Motorboat racing	Manga	
2013	La Magnifique Grande Scène	Cuvie	Dance (Ballet)	Manga	
2018	Ladyspo (Lady Sports)		Various	Anime	
2015	Laid-Back Camp (Yuru Camp)	Afro	Adventuring, Camping	Manga	
2010	Last Ranker: Be the Last One	Capcom	Martial arts	Video game	
2018	Late Bloomer	Isshin Tamaya	Martial arts	Manga	
1995	Legend of the End-of-Century Gambling Wolf Saga (Seikimatsu Bakurouden Saga)	Akira Miyashita	Gambling, Mahjong	Manga	
1997	The Legend of the Gambler: Tetsuya	Fūmei Sai, Yasushi Hoshino	Gambling	Manga	
2003	Legendz	Rin Hirai, Makoto Haruno	Legendz battle game	Manga	
2012	Levius	Haruhisa Nakata	Mecha boxing (Metalboxing)	Manga	
2019	Liar, Liar	Haruki Kuō, konomi	Games	Light novel	
2011	Little Battlers Experience Wars (Danball Senki)		Plamo battles (LBX battles)	Video game	
2021	Little Hands	Shouya Hosokawa	Handball	Manga	
2014	Logbook: Live, Love, Dive (The Logbook)	Na Young Moon	Scuba diving	Manga	
2012	Long Riders!	Taishi Miyake	Cycling	Manga	
2012	Love All Play	Asami Koseki	Badminton	Novel	
2002	Love Buzz	Takako Shimura	Professional wrestling	Manga	
1964	M.M Santa	Satoru Ozawa	Auto racing	Manga	
1976	Machine Hayabusa	Mikiya Mochizuki	Auto racing	Manga/Anime	
2009	Magical Girl Lyrical Nanoha ViVid	Masaki Tsuzuki, Takuya Fujima	Martial arts	Manga	
2021	Maguro-chan Wants to Be Eaten!	Hamo	Fishing	Manga	
2020	Maguro-Shoujo	Hideyuki Ishikawa	Fishing	Manga	
1985	Mahjong Hishō-den: Naki no Ryū	Junichi Nojo	Mahjong	Manga	
2023	Maid to Skate	Suzushiro	Skateboarding	Manga	
2011	Majan - Osoremura Kibun	Shinsaku Kamimura	Mahjong	Manga	
1994	Major	Takuya Mitsuda	Baseball	Manga	
2007	Maken-ki!	Hiromitsu Takeda	Martial arts (Maken combat matches)	Manga	
2007	March Comes in Like a Lion	Chica Umino	Shogi	Manga	
1996	Mars	Fuyumi Soryo	Motorcycle racing	Manga	
2008	Master of Martial Hearts	Hideki Shirane	Martial arts (Platonic Heart hunt)	Anime	
2004	Master Of Sea UMISHI	Yuuji Takemura, Yoichi Komori	Scuba diving	Manga	
2022	Matagi Gunner	Shouji Fujimoto, Juan Albarran	eSports	Manga	
1997	Medabots (Medarot)	Rin Horuma	Mecha, Robbatling	Video game	
2020	Medalist	Tsurumaikada	Figure skating	Manga	
2018	Megalo Box	Chikara Sakuma	Mecha boxing	Manga	
2001	MegaMan NT Warrior (Rockman.EXE)	Masahiro Yasuma, Capcom	Mecha, Net battles	RPG	
1987	Meimon! Daisan Yakyuubu	Toshiyuki Mutsu	Baseball	Manga	
2002	Melody of Oblivion	Shinji Katakura	Motorcycle driving, Mecha	Manga	
1994	Metal Fighter Miku	Hiroyuki Birukawa	Fictional wrestling (Neo pro-wrestling), Mecha	Anime	
2017	MF Ghost	Shuichi Shigeno	Street racing	Manga	
1994	Midori no Makibaō	Tsunomaru	Horse racing	Manga	
1983	Midship Jun	Satoshi Ikezawa	Auto racing	Manga	
2019	Mikazuki no Dragon (Dragon Under the Crescent Moon)	Kenichirou Nagao	Martial arts	Manga	
2011	Minami Kamakura High School Girls Cycling Club	Noriyuki Matsumoto	Cycling	Manga	
2021	Mini4King	Yuki Imada, Hiroyuki Takei, Kisuke Ohta	Car model racing	Manga	
1989	Mini Yon Soldier Rin!		Car model racing	Anime or Manga	
1995	Miniyon Fighter V (Mini-4WD Fighter V)	Takao Aoki	Car model battles	Manga	
1988	Miracle Giants Dome-kun	Shotaro Ishinomori	Baseball	Manga	
2002	Mitsuyoshi (Sekiganjuu Mitsuyoshi, Mitsuyoshi: Kanketsuhen)	Tetsuro Ueyama	Martial arts	Manga	
2023	Mizu Polo	Miho Isshiki, Naoki Mizuguchi	Water polo	Manga	
1994	Mobile Fighter G Gundam	Hajime Yatate, Yoshiyuki Tomino	Mecha, Gundam duels (Gundam Fight)	Anime	
2026	Mobile Suit Gundam EXVS - Girls on Extreme	Mokomokomaru Masao Yoshio	Mecha, Gundam duels (Gundam Extreme Versus)	Anime	
2022	Mobile Suit Gundam: The Witch from Mercury	Hajime Yatate, Yoshiyuki Tomino, Ichirō Ōkouchi	Mecha, Gundam duels	Anime	
2010	Model Suit Gunpla Builders Beginning G	Yōsuke Kuroda	Plamo battles (Gunpla battles)	Anime	
1991	Moero! Top Striker		Association football	Anime	
1987	The Momotaroh	Makoto Niwano	Professional wrestling	Manga	
1996	Monkey Turn	Katsutoshi Kawai	Hydroplane racing	Manga	
1997	Monster Rancher	Tecmo, Koei Tecmo	Monster battles	Video game	
2013	Monster Strike	Mixi	Video game, Holographic monster battles	Video game	
2018	Moon Land	Sai Yamagishi	Gymnastics	Manga	
1996	Mr. Tsuridoren	Katsuyuki Toda	Fishing sport	Manga	
1989	Murder License Kiba	Shinji Hiramatsu	Martial arts	Manga	
1981	Musashi no Ken	Motoka Murakami	Kendo	Manga	
2009	Musashi: The Dream of the Last Samurai		Martial arts	Anime	
2005	Mushiking: The King of Beetles the movie "The Road to the Greatest Champion"	Sega	Beetle Battle	Arcade card game	
1980	Muteking, The Dashing Warrior	Tatsunoko Production	Roller skating	Anime	
1967	My Judo	Hisao Maki, Satoshi Inoue	Judo	Manga	
2002	My Heavenly Hockey Club	Ai Morinaga	Ice hockey	Manga	
2009	Naked Wolves		Sumo	Anime	
2010	Nana Maru San Batsu (Fastest Finger First)	Iqura Sugimoto	Quiz bowl	Manga	
1999	Naniwa Tomoare: Osaka Kanjo Strut!	Minami Katsuhisa	Street racing	Manga	
2024	Narenare: Cheer for You!	Kōdai Kakimoto, Yuniko Ayana, Midori Gotō	Cheerleading	Anime	
2000	Nasu	Iou Kuroda	Cycling	Manga	
1975	Neppuu no Tora	Motoka Murakami	Motorcycle racing	Manga	
2021	Neru: Way of the Martial Artist	Minya Hiraga	Martial arts	Manga	
1998	New Generation Racer Mini 4 Kids (Mini 4 Kids)	Akira Himekawa	Car model racing	Manga	
2020	Ninja Collection	TV Tokyo	Martial arts	Anime	
2018	Ninja Reincarnation Shinobi Kill	Youichi Nishio	Martial arts	Manga	
2012	Ninja Slayer	Bradley Bond, Philip Ninj@ Morzez, Warainaku	Martial arts	Novel	
2020	Ninja vs. Gokudo	Shinsuke Kondō	Martial arts	Manga	
2020	Ninjala	GungHo Online Entertainment	Martial arts	Video game	
2012	No Game No Life	Yuu Kamiya	Games	Light novel	
2007	Nononono	Lynn Okamoto	Ski jumping	Manga	
1973	Notari Matsutarō (Rowdy Sumo Wrestler Matsutaro!!)	Tetsuya Chiba	Sumo	Manga	
2020	Number24	Rika Nakase	Rugby	Anime	
2006	Ōban Star-Racers	Savin Yeatman-Eiffel	Aircraft racing	Anime	
1988	Obi wo Gyutto ne! (Tighten Your Black Belt Hard!)	Katsutoshi Kawai	Judo	Manga	
2018	Oblivion Battery	Eko Mikawa	Baseball	Manga	
2006	Odds, Odds GP!, Odds VS!	Osamu Ishiwata	Cycling (Keirin)	Manga	
1987	Offside	Natsuko Heiuchi	Association football	Manga	
1987	Ogami Matsugorou	Minoru Itou	Martial arts	Manga	
1988	Oh My Goddess! (Ah! My Goddess!)	Kōsuke Fujishima	Motorcycle driving	Manga	
2016	Ohitsuri-sama	Tatsuya Tōji	Fishing sport	Manga	
2014	Oi! Tonbo	Ken Kawasaki, Yū Furusawa	Golf	Manga	
2018	Olympia Kyklos	Mari Yamazaki		Manga	
2021	Olympic Goddess: Nadeshiko Dormitory Medal Rice	Yunkeru	Various	Manga	
2016	Omoi no Kakera		Figure skating	Anime	
2012	One Off	Masahi Suzuki	Motorcycle driving	Anime	
1998	One Outs	Shinobu Kaitani	Baseball	Manga	
2014	The Ones Within	Osora	Games	Manga	
2004	Orange Delivery	Toshinori Sogabe, Bohemian K	Curling	Manga	
1973	Ore wa Teppei (I'm Teppei)	Tetsuya Chiba	Kendo	Manga	
2018	Osaka Mad Family	Akira Nobunaga	Street racing	Manga	
1985	Osu! Karate Club	Koji Takahashi	Martial arts, Karate	Manga	
2017	Otohime Diver	Okito Endou	Freediving	Manga	
2022	Otome no Chikyuu no Hashirikata	Bonryu	Orienteering	Manga	
2005	Oval x Over	Imai Touns	Auto racing (IndyCar)	Anime	
2005	Over Drive	Yasuda Tsuyoshi	Cycling	Manga	
1996	Over Rev! (A Legend of Ultimate Hot Rodder)	Katsumi Yamaguchi	Street racing, Auto circuit racing	Manga	
2023	Overtake!	Ayumi Sekine	Auto racing (F4)	Anime	
2009	Oyaju Rider	Makoto Raiku	Motorcycling (Offroad)	Manga	
2013	Oyoge! Hinano-chan	Tsutomu Fujikawa	Swimming	Manga	
1999	Peridot	Hiyoko Kobayashi	Martial arts	Manga	
2012	Phantasy Star Online 2 The Animation	Ryohei Uno, Satoshi Sakai	Video game	Video game	
2011	Phi Brain: Puzzle of God	Mayori Sekijima, Junichi Sato	Puzzle solving	Anime	
1996	Ping Pong	Taiyō Matsumoto	Table tennis	Manga	
2025	Ping-Pong Peril	Kataoka Yoshiharu	Underground table tennis	Manga	
1999	Pink Napoleon Fish	Reiichi Hiiro	Scuba diving	Manga	
1982	Plamo-Kyoshiro	Hisashi Yasui, Koichi Yamato	Plamo battles (Plamo Simulation)	Manga	
1982	Plawres Sanshiro	Jirō Gyū	Plamo battles (PlaWrestling), Robot wrestling	Manga	
2016	Plus-Sized Elf	Synecdoche	Calisthenics	Manga	
2010	Pocha-Pocha Swimming Club	Ema Tooyama	Swimming	Manga	
2024	Pokémon SPECIAL Scarlet & Violet	Nintendo, Kusaka Hidenori, Yamamoto Satoshi	Monster racing	Video game	
1986	Poker King	Yuuki Ishigaki, Masaru Miyazaki	Card game (Poker)	Manga	
2022	Pole Princess!!	Avex Pictures	Dance (Pole dancing)	Anime	
2024	Pole Star	Non	Dance (Pole dancing)	Manga	
2010	Pretty Rhythm	Mari Asabuki	Prism dance skate	Video game	
2011	Pretty Rhythm: Aurora Dream	Avex Pictures	Prism show	Video game	
2012	Pretty Rhythm: Dear My Future	Avex Pictures	Prism show	Video game	
2013	Pretty Rhythm: Rainbow Live	Avex Pictures	Prism show	Video game	
2013	Pretty Rhythm: All Star Selection	Avex Pictures	Prism show	Video game	
2012	Prince of Stride	Shuuji Sogabe	Running, Parkour	Light novel	
1999	The Prince of Tennis	Takeshi Konomi	Tennis	Manga	
1990	Princess Army	Miyuki Kitagawa	Judo	Manga	
2010	Princess Jellyfish: Go, Sisterhood Explorers!	Akiko Higashimura	Scouting	Manga	
1998	Princess Nine	Tomomi Mochizuki	Baseball	Anime	
1974	Pro Golfer Saru	Fujiko Fujio	Golf	Manga	
1997	Project ARMS	Kyoichi Nanatsuki, Ryōji Minagawa	Martial arts	Manga	
1969	Pro Wrestling Villain Series	Kajiwara Ikki, Maki Hisao, Kazumine Daiji	Professional wrestling	Manga	
2023	Protocol: Rain	Katsuhiko Takayama, Yasutaka Yamamoto	eSports	Anime	
2021	Pui Pui Molcar	Tomoki Misato	Auto driving	Anime	
2021	PuraOre! Pride of Orange	Touko Machida	Ice hockey	Anime	
1981	Racing Kozou Arashi	Satoshi Ikezawa	Motorcycle racing	Manga	
2024	Rappa: The Delinquent Ninja Scrolls	Eiji Hashimoto	Martial arts	Manga	
2021	RE-MAIN	Masafumi Nishida	Water polo	Anime	
1999	Real	Takehiko Inoue	Parasport (Wheelchair basketball)	Manga	
2017	Record of Ragnarok	Shinya Umemura, Takumi Fukui, Azychika	Martial arts (various)	Manga	
1994	Red Baron	Junki Takegami	Mecha, Metal Fights	Anime	
2022	Red Blue	Atsushi Namikiri	Martial arts	Manga	
2009	Redline	Takeshi Koike, Katsuhito Ishii, Yōji Enokido, Yoshiki Sakurai	Auto racing	Anime	
2001	Regatta: Kimi to Ita Eien	Hidenori Hara	Rowing	Manga	
1987	Reijou Wrestler	Hisao Maki, Yoshio Nakano	Professional wrestling	Manga	
2022	Reincarnation Coliseum	Harawata Saizou, Zunta	Martial arts	Manga	
2007	Rice Shoulder	Tsuyoshi Nakaima	Women's boxing	Manga	
1998	Ride On!	Akira Himekawa	Horse racing	Manga	
2003	Rideback	Tetsurō Kasahara	Motorsports, Mecha motorcycles	Manga	
2015	Rifle Is Beautiful (Chidori RSC)	Salmiakki	Air rifle	Manga	
1987	Riki-Oh	Masahiko Takajo, Tetsuya Saruwatari	Martial arts	Manga	
2013	Rikijo	Utamaro	Female sumo	Manga	
2020	Riko-san Bucchigiri desu!	Oota Hitoshi	Table tennis	Manga	
2014	Rikudō	Toshimitsu Matsubara	Boxing	Manga	
2003	Rindo	Takayuki Inouchi	Cycling	Manga	
2004	Ring	Mitsutoshi Shimabukuro	Ring	Manga	
1977	Ring ni Kakero	Masami Kurumada	Boxing	Manga	
1975	Ring no Takaou	Buronson, Jirou Kuwata	Professional wrestling	Manga	
2023	Ringing Fate		Mecha boxing	Anime	
2024	Rinkai!	Kiyoshi Yamane	Cycling (Keirin)	Manga / Anime	
2011	Rio: Rainbow Gate!	Mayori Sekijima	Games (Gate battles)	Anime	
1998	Rising Impact	Nakaba Suzuki	Golf	Manga	
2009	Ritou no Umi (Umi of the Island)	Takamichi	Scuba diving	Manga	
2017	RoboMasters: The Animated Series		Mecha, Robot battles	Competition	
1988	Rokudenashi Blues	Masanori Morita	Boxing	Manga	
2015	The Rolling Girls		Martial arts, Motorcycle driving	Anime	
1998	Rookies	Masanori Morita	Baseball	Manga	
1978	Rose of the Ring (Ring no Bara)	Mikiya Mochizuki	Professional wrestling	Manga	
1987	Rough	Mitsuru Adachi	Swimming, Diving	Manga	
2013	RPM	Keiichirou Shinmura	Street racing	Manga	
2008	Run Day Burst	Yu-Ko Osada	Auto racing	Manga	
2023	Run for money: The great mission (Tousouchuu: Great Mission)		Tag, Parkour	Game show	
2006	Run with the Wind	Shion Miura	Running (Ekiden)	Novel	
2015	The Ryuo's Work Is Never Done!	Shirow Shiratori	Shogi	Light novel	
2003	S.A (Special A)	Maki Minami	Various	Manga	
2007	S.P.Y. (Welcome to Swim Paradise!)	Ayane Ukyou	Swimming	Manga	
2010	Sabagebu!	Hidekichi Matsumoto	Airsoft	Manga	
2024	Sai-Kyo-Oh! Zukan	Gakken	Animal battle tournament	Children's book	
2005	Saikyō! Toritsu Aoizaka Kōkō Yakyūbu	Motoyuki Tanaka	Baseball	Manga	
2020	Saikyou Kamizmode!	Bandai	Sumo (Kamizumo)	Anime	
2015	Sailor Ace	Shuichi Shigeno	Baseball	Manga	
1985	Saint Seiya	Masami Kurumada	Martial arts	Manga	
2016	Sakana Shakai (Fish Society)	panpanya	Fishing	Manga	
2006	Saki	Ritz Kobayashi	Mahjong	Manga	
1985	Sakigake!! Otokojuku	Akira Miyashita	Martial arts	Manga	
2001	Salacia: Waga Hakugin no Mermaid	Go Nagai	Freediving	Manga	
2022	Salaryman's Club (Ryman's Club)	Aimi Yamauchi, Teruko Utsumi	Badminton	Anime	
1971	Samurai Giants	Ikki Kajiwara, Kō Inoue	Baseball	Manga	
1997	Samurai Girl: Real Bout High School	Reiji Saiga, Sora Inoue	Martial arts (K-Fights), Kendo	Light novel	
2009	Sayonara, Football	Naoshi Arakawa	Association football	Manga	
2010	Scan2Go	d-rights, NewBoy	Car model racing	Anime	
2016	Scorching Ping Pong Girls	Yagura Asano	Table tennis	Manga	
1992	Scramble Wars (Scramble Wars: Tsuppashire! Genom Trophy Rally, Super Deformed Double Feature)	Hideki Kakinuma, Hiroyuki Kitazume, Kenichi Sonoda, Toshiko Sasaki	Auto-moto racing	Anime	
2016	Secret Badminton Club	Satoru Nii	Badminton	Manga	
2018	Semi and the Magic Cube	Durufix	Puzzle solving	Anime	
2009	Sengoku Basara: Samurai Kings		Martial arts	Video game	
2011	Senran Kagura	Kenichiro Takaki	Martial arts	Video game	
1992	Shadow Skill	Megumu Okada	Martial arts	Manga	
1986	Shakotan Boogie	Michiharu Kusunoki	Street racing	Manga	
1998	Shamo (Fighting Rooster)	Akio Tanaka, Izo Hashimoto	Martial arts	Manga	
1982	Shonan Bakusozoku	Satoshi Yoshida	Motorcycle driving	Manga	
2025	Shunrai Table Tennis	Masahiro Hirakata	Table tennis	Manga	
1987	Shura no Mon	Masatoshi Kawahara	Martial arts, Karate	Manga	
2008	Shinakoi	Karuna Kanzaki, Yuuya Kurokami	Kendo	Manga	
2004	Shion no Ō	Masaru Katori, Jiro Ando	Shogi	Manga	
1993	Shippū! Iron Leaguer	Hajime Yatate	Mecha sports	Anime	
1990	Shoot!	Tsukasa Ooshima	Association football	Manga	
2005	Shojo Fight	Yoko Nihonbashi	Volleyball	Manga	
2011	Silent Blue	Ando Icori	Scuba diving	Manga	
2020	Silver Pole Flowers	Jizai Nyoi	Dance (Pole dancing)	Manga	
2008	Sittin' Girls	Kaoru Morishita	Parasport (Sitting volleyball)	Manga	
2021	SK8 the Infinity		Skateboarding	Anime	
2021	Skate-Leading Stars	Goro Taniguchi	Figure skating (Skate-leading)	Anime	
1990	Slam Dunk	Takehiko Inoue	Basketball	Manga	
2023	Slap!!!	Takeo Ono	Martial arts (Slap fighting)	Manga	
2001	Slot Noble Gin	Kengo Asai, Hiroyuki Hoshiyama, Tsunehisa Itō, Junichi Hayama	Pachi battles (Slotseum)	Anime	
2018	Slow Loop	Maiko Uchino	Fishing sport	Manga	
1986	Slow Step	Mitsuru Adachi	Softball	Manga	
2006	Smash!	Kaori Saki	Badminton	Manga	
2006	Smash Bomber	Hiroyuki Takei, DAIGO	Bodz battles	Manga	
1994	Soccer Fever		Association football	Anime	
2015	Sōkyū Boys	Kyuu Sakazuki, Fuwai	Handball	Manga	
1972	Song of Baseball Enthusiasts	Shinji Mizushima	Baseball	Manga	
2018	Spearfishing Girl (Mori Girl)	Hirohito Iwakuni	Spearfishing	Manga	
2008	Speed Heaven	Ichiro Shinmurake	Street racing	Manga	
1966	Speed Racer	Tatsuo Yoshida	Auto racing	Manga	
2010	Speedy Wonder	Akihiro Yamane, Masaya Tsunamoto	Horse racing	Manga	
2005	Splatoon	Sankichi Hinodeya	Turf wars	Video game	
2005	Splash!!	Yasushi Matsuda, Kiyokazu Chiba	Diving	Manga	
2015	Sports Girl (I Like Sports Girls!)	Gamang	Various	Manga	
1984	Sprinter	Yuu Koyama	Running	Manga	
2000	SS	Shohei Harumoto	Street racing, Rally	Manga	
1966	Star of the Giants / Suraj: The Rising Star	Ikki Kajiwara, Noboru Kawasaki	Baseball / Cricket	Manga	
2023	Star: Strike It Rich	Yabako Sandrovich	Martial arts (MMA)	Manga	
2019	Stars Align	Kazuki Akane	Tennis	Anime	
2004	Steel Ball Run	Hirohiko Araki	Horse racing	Manga	
2010	Stella Women's Academy, High School Division Class C^{3}	Ikoma, Getsumin, Kokudō 12-gō	Airsoft	Manga	
1994	Stone Buster!	Masaru Miyazaki, Hiroshi Uno	Martial arts	Manga	
1994	Street Fighter	Kenichi Imai, Gisaburō Sugii, Shuko Murase, Reiko Yoshida	Martial arts	Video games	
2000	Subaru (Dance! Subaru)	Masahito Soda	Dance (Ballet, Breakdance)	Manga	
2001	Sugar	Hideki Arai	Boxing	Manga	
2005	Sugar Princess	Hisaya Nakajo	Figure skating	Manga	
2017	Suikyuu Donburako	Kento Matsuura, Tougo Gotou	Water polo	Manga	
2008	Suiren	Mio Nanao	Swimming	Manga	
2014	Summer Salt Turn	Renji Hoshi, Hajime Inoryuu	Swimming	Manga	
2004	Sumomomo, Momomo	Shinobu Ohtaka	Martial arts	Manga	
2000	The Summit of the Gods	Jiro Taniguchi	Mountaineering	Manga	
2013	Summon! Swordsman School	Kami Imai	Kendo	Manga	
2010	Super Class! Mobile Fighter G Gundam	Yasuhiro Imagawa, Kazuhiko Shimamoto	Mecha, Gundam duels (Gundam Fight)	Manga	
2016	Super Cub	Tone Kōken	Motorcycle driving	Light novel	
1997	Super Yo-Yo	Takashi Hashiguchi	Yo-yo	Manga	
1977	Supercar Gattiger	Eiwa, Nihon Keizai Advertising	Auto racing	Anime	
2011	Supinamarada!	Satoru Noda	Ice hockey	Manga	
2004	Suzuka	Kōji Seo	High jump	Manga	
2010	Swimming (Fukushima Teppei Collection of short stories)	Teppei Fukushima	Swimming	Manga	
2010	SWOT	Naoya Sugita	Martial arts	Manga	
2009	Tailenders	Hisashi Sasaki, Makoto Ohta, Masaru Kawahara, mebae	Auto racing	Anime	
2007	Taishō Baseball Girls	Atsushi Kagurazaka, Sadaji Koike	Baseball	Light novel	
2005	Takaya: Senbu Gakuen Gekitouden	Yuujirō Sakamoto	Martial arts	Manga	
2016	Tamayomi	Mountain Pukuichi	Baseball	Manga	
1990	Tasuke, the Samurai Cop (Edokko Boy: Gatten Tasuke)	Manavu Kashimoto	Martial arts	Manga	
2012	Teekyu	Roots, Piyo	Various	Manga	
1998	Tekken	Ryōta Yamaguchi, Dai Satō, Gavin Hignight	Martial arts	Video games	
1989	Ten: Tenhō-dōri no Kaidanji	Nobuyuki Fukumoto	Mahjong	Manga	
1997	Tenjho Tenge	Oh! great	Martial arts	Manga	
2021	Tenkaichi: The Greatest Warrior Under the Rising Sun	Yōsuke Nakamaru, Kyōtarō Azuma	Martial arts	Manga	
2008	Teppu (Iron Wind)	Moare Ohta	Martial arts (MMA)	Manga	
1982	Tetsu no Donquijote (Iron Don Quijote)	Tetsuo Hara	Mecha racing (Motocross on steel horses)	Manga	
2012	Tetsunaki no Kirinji (The Prodigy of Iron Calls)	Uhyosuke	Mahjong	Manga	
2026	That Time I Got Reincarnated in PES	Konami Digital Entertainment, Wakasugi Kiminori	Association football (eFootball)	Video game	
2025	Throw Step!	Satoru Abou	Handball	Manga	
2018	Tiempo	Daisuke Iino	Association football	Manga	
1968	Tiger Mask	Ikki Kajiwara, Naoki Tsuji	Professional wrestling	Manga	
2017	Tobaku Senpai Nani Kakeru?	Kuzushiro	Gambling, Board games	Manga	
2003	Tobakushi Fukurou	Fuumei Sai, Yasushi Hoshino	Mahjong	Manga	
2006	Tōhai	Kōji Shinasaka	Mahjong	Manga	
2004	Tokkyuu!!	Mitsurou Kubo, Yoichi Komori	Scuba diving	Manga	
2017	Tomica Hyper Rescue Drive Head Kidō Kyūkyū Keisatsu	Kenichi Araki	Auto driving, Mecha	Anime	
1988	Tomoe ga Yuku!	Yumi Tamura	Roller skating	Manga	
2016	Toppu GP	Kōsuke Fujishima	Motorcycle racing	Manga	
1981	Touch	Mitsuru Adachi	Baseball, gymnastics	Manga	
1993	Tough	Tetsuya Saruwatari	Martial arts	Manga	
2009	Toumei Accel	Norifusa Mita	Motorboat racing	Manga	
2014	Tribe Cool Crew	Atsuhiro Tomioka, Miya Asakawa, Nobuaki Yamaguchi, Kouji Miura, Yuko Ishiyama, Makoto Koyama	Dance battles	Anime	
2022	Tribe Nine	Kazutaka Kodaka	Baseball (Extreme baseball)	Anime	
2018	Try Knights	Shunsaku Yano (Story), Chizuka Erisawa (Art)	Rugby union	Manga	
2023	Tsubame Alpine	Fumika Minami	Mountaineering	Manga	
2006	Tsumanuda Fight Town	Michirou Ueyama	Martial arts, Street fighting	Manga	
2009	Tsuri Chichi Nagisa	Masaki Sato	Fishing sport	Manga	
2021	TsuriKomachi (Fishing Village)	Natsuki Yamasaki	Fishing sport	Manga	
2016	Tsurune	Kotoko Ayano	Kyūdō	Light novel	
2012	Tsuwamono!!	Fumihiro Kiso	Martial arts	Manga	
2018	Tsuyoshi: The One Who No One can Win Against	Kyōsuke Maruyama	Martial arts	Manga	
2025	Turkey!	Naomi Hiruta	Bowling	Anime	
2015	Turning Mecard	Atsushi Maekawa	Auto driving, Mecha	Anime	
1981	Twin Hawks (Futaridaka)	Kaoru Shintani	Motorcycle racing	Manga	
2017	Two Car	Katsuhiko Takayama	Motorcycle racing (Sidecar)	Anime	
2003	TWO Toppu!	Yoshiki Fujii, Rintarou Asahi	Martial arts	Manga	
2022	Type S: Chiaki's Journey	Acura	Auto racing	Anime	
2006	Ultimate Gachinko	Takahashi Shinsuke	Martial arts (MMA)	Manga	
2015	Ultimate Janken	Inukorosuke	Rock-paper-scissors	Manga	
2017	Ultimate Oasobi	Inukorosuke	Sugoroku	Manga	
2002	Ultra Red	Nakaba Suzuki	Martial arts	Manga	
2020	Umamusume: Cinderella Gray	Masafumi Sugiura, Taiyou Kuzumi	Horse racing	Manga	
2018	Umamusume: Pretty Derby	Cygames	Horse racing	Video game	
1998	Umizaru (Sea Monkeys)	Shūhō Satō	Scuba diving	Manga	
1984	Usagi Yojimbo	Stan Sakai	Martial arts	Manga	
2006	Usogui (The Lie Eater)	Toshio Sako	Gambling	Manga	
2015	Venus Project: Climax	Galat	Mecha, Dance, Formula Venus	Video game	
2018	Versus Gyoshin-san!	Takao Yaguchi, Katsumi Tatsuzawa	Fishing sport	Manga	
2012	Victory Kickoff!!		Association football	Anime	
2019	Viral Hit	Taejun Pak, Kim Junghyun	Martial arts	Manhwa	
2002	Virtua Fighter	Tsutomu Kamishiro	Martial arts	Video games	
2016	ViVid Strike!	Masaki Tsuzuki	Martial arts	Manga	
2010	Vongola GP Kuru! (Vongola Grand Prix Kuru!)	Takayama Toshinori	Kart racing	Manga	
2014	Waiting for Spring	Anashin	Basketball	Manga	
2011	Walkure Romanze	Ricotta	Jousting	Visual novel	
2019	Wandance	Coffee	Dance (Freestyle dancing)	Manga	
1990	Wangan Midnight	Michiharu Kusunoki	Street racing	Manga	
2011	Wanna Be the Strongest in the World!	ESE, Kiyohito Natsuki	Professional wrestling (female)	Manga	
1986	Wanna-Be's	Toshimichi Suzuki, Ken'ichi Sonoda	Professional wrestling	Anime	
1970	Waru	Hisao Maki, Jōya Kagemaru	Martial arts	Manga	
2020	Wave!!: Surfing Yappe!!		Surfing	Anime	
2009	Weiß Survive	Bushiroad	Card games	Anime/Manga	
2011	Welcome to the Ballroom	Tomo Takeuchi	Dance (Ballroom dancing)	Manga	
2011	Welcome to the Winners' Circle	Shinobu Kaitani	Horse racing (Betting)	Manga	
1998	Whistle!	Daisuke Higuchi	Association football	Manga	
2003	Wild Baseballers	Tooru Fujisawa, Taro Sekiguchi	Baseball	Manga	
1998	Wind Mill	Takashi Hashiguchi	Softball	Manga	
1986	Yawara!	Naoki Urasawa	Judo	Manga	
1991	Yoban Sādo (3rd Base 4th)	Gosho Aoyama	Baseball	Manga	
2006	Yomigaeru Sora – Rescue Wings	Fumihiko Takayama	Helicopter piloting	Anime	
1982	Yoroshiku Mechadock (Leave it to Mecha-Doc)	Ryuji Tsugihara	Auto racing	Manga	
2001	Yorozuyama's Ten Bouts	Kenji Okamura	Sumo	Manga	
2008	Yowamushi Pedal	Wataru Watanabe	Cycling	Manga	
2016	Yuri on Ice	Sayo Yamamoto, Mitsurō Kubo	Figure skating	Anime	
1967	Yuuyake Banchō	Ikki Kajiwara, Toshio Shoji	Various	Manga	
2006 (2005)	Zan (Hatenkou)	Naoya Sugita	Martial arts (Otogi sport)	Manga (One shot)	
2007	Zanbara!	Ikumi Katagiri	Martial arts	Manga	
2024	Zeni Banzuke	Kyousuke Yamasaki	Sumo	Manga	
1970	Zenikko (The Money Kid)	Kobako Hanato, Shinji Mizushima		Manga	
1990	Zero	Taiyou Matsumoto	Boxing	Manga	
2016	Zero Angel: Fallen Angel of the Blue Wind	Kia Asamiya	Street racing	Manga	
2003	Zoids: Fuzors	Hideki Shirane	Mecha, Zoid duels	Anime	
2001	Zoids: New Century	Katsuyuki Sumisawa	Military game (Zoid duels), Mecha	Anime	
