= Strike or Gutter =

Japanese manga series

- First tankōbon volume cover

ストライク・オア・ガター (Sutoraiku oa Gatā)
- Genre: Comedy; Sports
- Manga
- Written by: Yū Andō
- Published by: Shueisha
- Magazine: Grand Jump
- Original run: July 18, 2018 – March 17, 2021
- Volumes: 6
- icon

Strike or Gutter (Japanese: ストライク・オア・ガター, Hepburn: Sutoraiku oa Gatā) is a Japanese manga series written and illustrated by Yū Andō. It was serialized in Shueisha's seinen manga magazine Grand Jump from July 2018 to March 2021, with its chapters collected in six tankōbon volumes.

== Publication ==
Written and illustrated by Yū Andō, Strike or Gutter was serialized in Shueisha's seinen manga magazine Grand Jump from July 18, 2018, to March 17, 2021. Shueisha collected its chapters in six tankōbon volumes, released from March 19, 2019, to May 19, 2021.

=== Volumes ===
No.	Release date	ISBN
1	March 19, 2019	978-4-08-891245-5
2	September 19, 2019	978-4-08-891357-5
3	March 19, 2020	978-4-08-891520-3
4	July 17, 2020	978-4-08-891605-7
5	January 19, 2021	978-4-08-891774-0
6	May 19, 2021	978-4-08-891882-2

== See also ==
- Bowling King
