= Little Hands =

Little Hands may refer to:

== Film ==
- Little Hands (2011 film), an Australian film directed by Claire McCarthy
- Little Hands (2017 film), a French/Belgian short film directed by Rémi Allier

== Music ==
- Little Hands (album), by Charlie Simpson, or the title song, 2016
- Little Hands, an album by Jonathan Edwards, 1987
- "Little Hands", a song by BMX Bandits, 1993
- "Little Hands", a song by Mother Mother from Touch Up, 2007
- "Little Hands", a song by Sarah Vaughan from Pop Artistry of Sarah Vaughan, 1966
- "Little Hands", a song by Skip Spence from Oar, 1969

== Other uses ==
- Little Hands (manga), a 2021 sports manga
