= Ganba! Fly High =

Japanese manga series by Shinji Morisue and Hiroyuki Kikuta and its anime adaptation

- Manga volume 1 cover

ガンバ! Fly High (Ganba Furai Hai)
- Genre: Sports
- Manga
- Written by: Shinji Morisue
- Illustrated by: Hiroyuki Kikuta
- Published by: Shogakukan
- Imprint: Shōnen Sunday Comics
- Magazine: Weekly Shōnen Sunday
- Original run: June 8, 1994 – October 18, 2000
- Volumes: 34
- Anime television series

Gambalist! Shun
- Directed by: Hajime Kamegaki
- Produced by: Michihiko Suwa (Yomiuri TV); Masuo Ueda (Sunrise); Mikihiro Iwata (Sunrise)
- Written by: Katsuhiko Chiba
- Music by: Hiroaki Serizawa; Akira Ishiguro
- Studio: Sunrise
- Original network: NNS (YTV, NTV)
- Original run: July 1, 1996 – March 10, 1997
- Episodes: 30
- icon

Ganba! Fly High (Japanese: ガンバ! Fly High, Hepburn: Ganba Furai Hai) is a Japanese sports manga series written by Shinji Morisue and illustrated by Hiroyuki Kikuta. It is about high school gymnast Shun Fujimaki as he pursues his goal of competing in the 2000 Olympic Games, and is in part based on Morisue's experiences as an Olympic champion. The series was published in Shogakukan's shōnen manga magazine Weekly Shōnen Sunday from June 1994 to October 2000, with its chapters collected into 34 tankōbon volumes.

The series was adapted as a 30-episode anime television series titled Gambalist! Shun, produced by Sunrise and broadcast on Yomiuri TV from July 1996 to March 1997.

In 1998, Ganba! Fly High received the 43rd Shogakukan Manga Award for the shōnen category.

== Media ==
=== Manga ===
Written by Shinji Morisue and illustrated by Hiroyuki Kikuta, Ganba! Fly High was serialized in Shogakukan's Weekly Shōnen Sunday from June 8, 1994, to October 18, 2000. Morisue based the series on his own real-life experiences in winning the gold in horizontal bar in the Los Angeles Olympics in 1984 and wanted to inspire more kids to try gymnastics themselves. Shogakukan collected its chapters into thirty-four tankōbon volumes, released from December 10, 1994, to December 18, 2000.

=== Anime ===
A 30-episode anime television series adaptation, titled Gambalist! Shun (ガンバリスト!駿, Ganbarisuto! Shun), was produced by Sunrise and broadcast on Yomiuri TV from July 1, 1996, to March 10, 1997.

== Reception and legacy ==
In 1998, the manga won the 43rd Shogakukan Manga Award for the shōnen category.

The gold-medalist gymnast Kōhei Uchimura has credited the series with helping to inspire him in the sport.
