= Pretty Rhythm (manga) =

Japanese manga series

- Cover of the Japanese version of vol. 1, first released on April 1, 2011

プリティーリズム (Puritī Rizumu)
- Genre: Sports (Figure skating)
- Manga
- Written by: Mari Asabuki
- Published by: Shueisha
- Imprint: Ribon Mascot Comics
- Magazine: Ribon
- Original run: July 3, 2010 – May 2, 2012
- Volumes: 5

Pretty Rhythm (Japanese: プリティーリズム, Hepburn: Puritī Rizumu) is a Japanese manga series written and illustrated by Mari Asabuki based on the 2010 arcade game Pretty Rhythm: Mini Skirt. It was serialized in the monthly shōjo manga magazine Ribon from the August 2010 issue to the June 2012 issue. The manga ran concurrent to the manga adaptation of Pretty Rhythm: Aurora Dream in Ciao.

== Plot ==
A new sport called "Prism Dance Skate", which combines figure skating and dance, has become popular with the creation of Prism Skates, shoes that allow people to ice skate on any surface. Junior high school student Rizumu Amamiya enrolls in the Prism Dance Academy to become a professional Prism Star. At the Prism Dance Academy, Rizumu meets Serena Jōnouchi and Kanon Tōdō, and together, they compete under the team name Asterism.

== Characters ==
=== Asterism ===
Rizumu Amamiya (天宮 りずむ, Amamiya Rizumu)
Rizumu is a clumsy second-year middle school student with a positive approach and a hardworking attitude.
Serena Jōnouchi (城之内 セレナ, Jōnouchi Serena)
Serena is a top student at the Prism Dance Academy and is popular in class.
Kanon Tōdō (藤堂 かのん, Tōdō Kanon)
Kanon is Hibiki's younger sister.

=== Callings ===
Hibiki (ヒビキ, Hibiki)
Hibiki is a popular Prism Star who is serious and level-headed.
Wataru (ワタル)
Wataru is a Prism Star who often flirts with other girls.

== Media ==
=== Manga ===
Pretty Rhythm is written and illustrated by Mari Asabuki and is an adaptation of the 2010 arcade game Pretty Rhythm: Mini Skirt. It was serialized in the monthly shōjo manga magazine Ribon from the August 2010 issue released on July 3, 2010, to the June 2012 issue released on May 2, 2012. The chapters were later released in 5 bound volumes by Shueisha under the Ribon Mascot Comics imprint. The series ran concurrent to the manga adaptation of Pretty Rhythm: Aurora Dream in Ciao.

No.	Japanese release date	Japanese ISBN
1	April 1, 2011	978-4-08-867115-4
1. "Dreamin' Girl"; 2. "Prism School" (プリズムスクール, Purizumu Sukūru); 3. "Serena Appears" (セレナ登場, Serena Tōjō); 4. "Put Your Heart Into It" (ハートをこめて, Hāto o Komete); 5. "Kanon Appears" (かのん登場, Kanon Tōjō)
2	May 18, 2011	978-4-08-867122-2
6. "Prism Debut" (プリズムデビュー★, Purizumu Debyū); 7. "Second Stage" (セカンドステージ★, Sekando Sutēji); 8. "Black & White Magic" (ブラック&ホワイトマジック★); 9. "Rizumu's Secret" (りずむの秘密, Rizumu no Himitsu); 10. "Silver Rank" (シルバーランク, Shirubā Ranku)
3	October 19, 2011	978-4-08-867149-9
11. "Mystery Wind" (ミステリーウインド, Misuterī U~indo); 12. "Moon Flower Grandeur" (月華荘厳, Gekka Sōgon); 13. "Black Cat Waltz" (ブラックキャット・ワルツ, Burakku Kyatto Warutsu); 14. "Restart!!" (リスタート!!, Risutāto!!); Extra Story (番外編, Bangai-hen)
4	April 17, 2012	978-4-08-867193-2
15. "Proof of Growth" (成長の証, Seichō no Akashi); 16. "Bonds" (キズナ, Kizuna); 17. "Beyond the Wall!!" (壁の向こうへ, Kabe no Mukō e!!); 18. "Dancing Smile" (ダンシング・スマイル, Danshingu Sumairu); 19. "The Biggest Challenge!!" (最大のチャレンジ!!, Saidai no Charenji!!); 20. "New Stage" (ニュー ステージ, Nyū Sutēji)
5	October 20, 2012	978-4-08-867227-4
21. "The Road to Becoming a Prism Star" (プリズムスターへの道, Purizumu Sutā e no Michi); 22. "Last Dance" (ラスト・ダンス, Rasuto Dansu); 23. "Still Dreaming" (まだ、夢の途中, Mada, Yume no Tochū); Extra Story (番外編, Bangai-hen); Extra Story: "Step of Memory" (番外編 ステップ オブ メモリー, Bangai-hen: Suteppu Obu Memorī)
