= Maid to Skate =

Japanese manga series

- First tankōbon volume cover

メイドスケーター (Meido Sukētā)
- Genre: Comedy; Slice of life; Sports
- Manga
- Written by: Suzushiro
- Published by: East Press
- English publisher: NA: Viz Media
- Magazine: Matogrosso; (May 18, 2023 – August 28, 2025); Comic Porta; (TBA)
- Original run: May 18, 2023 – present
- Volumes: 2

Maid to Skate (メイドスケーター, Meido Sukētā) is a Japanese manga series written and illustrated by Suzushiro. It began serialization on East Press' Matogrosso manga website in May 2023.

== Synopsis ==
The series is set in a world where the most skilled maids are also skilled at riding a skateboard.

== Publication ==
Written and illustrated by Suzushiro, Maid to Skate began serialization on East Press' Matogrosso website on May 18, 2023. After the discontinuation of Matogrosso in May 2026, the series is set to resume on the Comic Porta website at an undetermined date. The series' chapters have been compiled into two tankōbon volumes as of October 2025. The series is licensed in English by Viz Media.

No.	Original release date	Original ISBN	North American release date	North American ISBN
1	March 19, 2024	978-4-7816-2293-4	December 16, 2025	978-1-9747-5584-4
1. "Benihana"; 2. "Skate Shop"; 3. "Park"; 4. "Cooking Duty"; 5. "Chasing After the Kitten"; Bonus: "Iris's Skateboard Corner 1–5"; Special side story: "Just Another Day"
2	October 8, 2025	978-4-7816-2494-5	November 17, 2026	978-1-9747-6937-7

== Reception ==
The series's English lettering by Madeleine Jose won Best Lettering at the 3rd American Manga Awards in 2026.
