= Sōkyū Boys =

Japanese manga series

- First tankōbon volume cover, featuring Nagi Sakura (left) and Eito Shiguma (right)

送球ボーイズ (Sōkyū Bōizu)
- Genre: Sports
- Manga
- Written by: Fuwai
- Illustrated by: Kyū Sakazuki
- Published by: Shogakukan
- Imprint: Ura Sunday Comics
- Magazine: MangaONE; Ura Sunday
- Original run: December 29, 2015 – May 27, 2022
- Volumes: 25
- icon

Sōkyū Boys (Japanese: 送球ボーイズ, Hepburn: Sōkyū Bōizu) is a Japanese web manga series written by Fuwai and illustrated by Kyū Sakazuki. It was serialized on Shogakukan's online platforms MangaONE and Ura Sunday from December 2015 to May 2022.

== Publication ==
Written by Fuwai and illustrated by Kyū Sakazuki, Sōkyū Boys was serialized on Shogakukan's online platform MangaONE from December 29, 2015, to May 27, 2022; it was also published on Ura Sunday from January 6, 2016, to June 3, 2022. Shogakukan released twenty-five tankōbon volumes from May 18, 2016, to November 17, 2022.

=== Volumes ===
No.	Release date	ISBN
1	May 18, 2016	978-4-09-127260-7
2	August 12, 2016	978-4-09-127369-7
3	November 18, 2016	978-4-09-127441-0
4	March 17, 2017	978-4-09-127550-9
5	May 19, 2017	978-4-09-127605-6
6	September 12, 2017	978-4-09-127780-0
7	November 15, 2017	978-4-09-128023-7
8	February 19, 2018	978-4-09-128168-5
9	May 18, 2018	978-4-09-128296-5
10	August 17, 2018	978-4-09-128443-3
11	November 19, 2018	978-4-09-128650-5
12	February 19, 2019	978-4-09-128838-7
13	June 19, 2019	978-4-09-129236-0
14	October 11, 2019	978-4-09-129415-9
15	February 12, 2020	978-4-09-129585-9
16	June 12, 2020	978-4-09-850143-4
17	October 12, 2020	978-4-09-850296-7
18	February 19, 2021	978-4-09-850459-6
19	June 10, 2021	978-4-09-850596-8
20	October 18, 2021	978-4-09-850754-2
21	February 10, 2022	978-4-09-850886-0
22	June 10, 2022	978-4-09-851159-4
23	August 10, 2022	978-4-09-851230-0
24	October 12, 2022	978-4-09-851338-3
25	November 17, 2022	978-4-09-851412-0
