= Bowling King =

Japanese manga series

ボウリングキング (Bōringu Kingu)
- Genre: Comedy, Sports
- Manga
- Written by: Tong Ai
- Published by: Akane Shinsha
- Magazine: New Youth Express
- Original run: 1997 – 2008
- Volumes: 24

Bowling King (Japanese: ボウリングキング, Hepburn: Bōringu Kingu) is a Japanese manga series written and illustrated by Taiwanese artist Tong Ai. It is published by Akane Shinsha and serialized in New Youth Express. The story is about a boy named Shautieh Ley and the humiliation he puts himself and his opponents through in bowling alleys.

== Plot ==
The story begins with Shautieh Ley in high school, after his internet girlfriend breaks up with him. After he skips class with his best friend Houshin, he meets Tz'Zuhn, a high school girl, and immediately falls in love with her. They are confronted by a gang in public, due to Shautieh having angered his teacher. Shautieh challenges them to an arm wrestling match and wins, thanks to his abnormally powerful left arm, leaving unharmed.

Shautieh challenges Edgar to a bowling match and Edgar accepts. Shautieh trains by locking himself up in a room and studying recorded videos of professional bowlers from around the world, an act which makes him develop a fever. During that match, after showing off Bruce Ray and Don Carter's techniques, he shows off his photographic memory capabilities and performs Edgar's own 3-step approach.

Shautieh trains for the upcoming God's Hand Cup for his rematch against Edgar as he will be participating in it as well with a few more contenders.

== Characters ==
Shautieh Ley
The hero of the series. A high school boy who has a powerful left arm that is strong enough to beat a bodybuilder in an arm wrestling contest and even to smash a car's hood by punching it through. Shautieh Ley has the amazing ability of photographic memory and so is able to copy a person's movement when bowling and usually achieve the same results, which ignites his bowling career. With his strong left arm and some bowling videos of other famous bowlers, he sets off to conquer the bowling alleys with his newfound skill and his dirty hijinks. When facing an opponent, he usually breaks their concentration by impersonating pop culture idols or performing ridiculous stunts even at his own expense. A theme develops when Shautieh receives a disadvantage, usually before an important match which can include having a broken arm or having diarrhea and thus must rely on his own tricks to win the said bowling match.
Tz'Zuhn
The heroine. A high school girl who works at the bowling alley that her father owns. She is seen as beautiful, although having a hot temper, and usually has to put up with Shautieh and his hijinks. Her father is struggling with the bowling alley, due to her brother leaving the family with a large debt and going missing shortly afterwards. She is in a relationship with Edgar after meeting him when he first visited Japan for a bowling match. After a series of events she realises she is in love with Shautieh.
Houshin
Shautieh's best and only friend. He is usually around to help Shautieh with his hijinks, usually against his will. However, he is loyal to Shautieh, going as far as to do everything he can to help Shautieh in his time of need.
Edgar
Tz'Zuhn's significant other who is 27 years old, originally from Mexico and living in New York as a popular professional bowler. He was once engaged to Lily in New York but during a bachelor party, a terrible accident happened resulting in the death of a stripper, with Lily's brother taking the blame. Her brother commits suicide because of it and Edgar's engagement has been broken off since. He is now in a relationship with Tz'Zuhn.
Lily
The loan shark's companion who is a professional bowler. She was once engaged to Edgar back in New York but after a terrible accident involving the death of her brother, they split up, and she moved to Japan afterwards. After bowling with Shautieh, she leaves the loan shark and appears later to watch Shautieh's matches.
Yen Ni
Daughter of the rich businessman who is hosting a bowling tournament. She vain and considers herself more beautiful than any other girl in the world. After being rejected by Shautieh, she makes it her mission to make him to fall in love with her so that she can dump him and make his life miserable. However, most of her attempts at seducing Shautieh are usually dismissed or backfire, and end up with her suffering something as dire as anesthesia or breaking her toe. Later in the series, her family loses all its money and properties and she is forced to leave her more trifling matters aside to focus on her own subsistence, along with her brother, who ends up facing the same issues.
Jen Ni
He is Yen Ni 's brother, a womanizing and prideful man, albeit a skilled bowler. He prefers to continue bowling and as such, does not plan on inheriting his father's company. He becomes infatuated with Tz'Zuhn when she starts working as a maid at his family's mansion as a result of one of Yen Ni's plans, and vows to conquer her heart. He is frequently at odds with Shautieh because of that, resulting in a bowling match between the two of them.
Maruko Sisters
Triplets who are Shautieh's first self-proclaimed fans. They are short and chubby girls who later appear in Shautieh's matches, cheering for him. They are determined to learn everything there is to know about him, and provide many laughs with their crazed attempts at keeping Shautieh in a good condition during matches.

== Bowling techniques ==
Bruce Ray's Cross Grip
In the first match between Shautieh and Edgar, Shautieh performs the cross grip which involves a stance with both hands on the ball, to form a cross, while gripping on the ball and using a pendulum movement to increase the force of the ball when thrown towards the pins.
Don Carter's Pitcher Delivery
In the same match, Shautieh performs Don Carter's self-invented delivery pitch, a technique created to take advantage of a strong arm that Don Carter developed in his days of baseball before playing bowling.

== See also ==
- Strike or Gutter
