= Irregulars (manga) =

Japanese manga series

- First tankōbon volume cover

イレギュラーズ (Iregyurāzu)
- Genre: Sports (baseball)
- Manga
- Written by: Naoki Matsumoto
- Published by: Kodansha
- Imprint: Shōnen Magazine Comics
- Magazine: Magazine Pocket
- Original run: April 28, 2021 – present
- Volumes: 22

Irregulars (イレギュラーズ, Iregyurāzu) is a Japanese manga series written and illustrated by Naoki Matsumoto. It began serialization on Kodansha's Magazine Pocket service in April 2021, and has been compiled into 22 volumes as of November 2026.

== Plot ==
Jyosei Academy was once a school with a negative reputation but had a notable baseball program, having won the Kōshien baseball tournaments multiple times. However, after it rebranded itself as a elite prep school, its baseball team became neglected, with the academy's focus on academics leading to a decline in interest for non-academic matters. With only four members left, the team members have been branded as "irregulars" by the school community. However, Ruito Hibino, one of the team's players, has not given up on his dream on bringing the team to its former glory. Needing more members in order to form a full team, Ruito learns that Jyosei's team will combine with another team in tournaments. However, he then finds out that the other team is the Meikyo High School baseball team, Meikyo being a school notorious for its delinquency and is considered the worst school in the Kantō region.

== Characters ==
Ruito Hibino (日々野 塁斗, Hibino Ruito)
A second-year student and a member of Jyosei Academy's baseball team. He admired Jyosei's team when he was younger and aimed to become part of their baseball team, despite his skills lacking at the time to the point he would only usually play as a substitute.
Kiichi Kinose (木ノ瀬 喜一, Kinose Kiichi)
A second-year student and a member of Jyosei Academy's baseball team.
Chiaki Mizushima (水島 千秋, Mizushima Chiaki)
A second-year student and a member of Jyosei Academy's baseball team.
Shoutaro Kagari (火狩 将太郎, Kagari Shōtarō)
A member of Meiko High School's baseball team. He was once a skilled and widely admired baseball player in junior high school and was expected to reach Kōshien, but after a certain incident had disappeared from the map.
Kouki Chiyozuka (地与塚 紅樹, Chiyozuka Kōki)
A second-year student and a member of Meikyo High School's baseball team.
Ellis Kate (エリス・ケイト, Erisu Keito)
A second-year student and a member of Meikyo High School's baseball team.
Yasuhiro Toganō (土叶 安寛, Toganō Yasuhiro)
A second-year student and a member of Meikyo High School's baseball team.
Kazumi Kaneko (金子 和美, Kaneko Kazumi)
A second-year student and a member of Meikyo High School's baseball team.

== Publication ==
The series is written and illustrated by Naoki Matsumoto, who began serializing it on Kodansha's Magazine Pocket service on April 28, 2021. The first tankōbon volume was released on August 17, 2021; In a video collaboration with former baseball player Tomoya Satozaki, Matsumoto drew nine baseball players in manga form, imagining them as if they were characters in a manga. Twenty-two volumes have been released as of November 17, 2026.

No.	Release date	ISBN
1	August 17, 2021	978-4-06-524491-3
2	November 17, 2021	978-4-06-525935-1
3	February 17, 2022	978-4-06-526900-8
4	May 17, 2022	978-4-06-527920-5
5	August 17, 2022	978-4-06-528829-0
6	November 17, 2022	978-4-06-529490-1
7	February 17, 2023	978-4-06-530557-7
8	May 17, 2023	978-4-06-531576-7
9	August 17, 2023	978-4-06-532613-8
10	November 16, 2023	978-4-06-533547-5
11	February 16, 2024	978-4-06-534569-6
12	May 16, 2024	978-4-06-535515-2
13	August 16, 2024	978-4-06-536521-2
14	November 15, 2024	978-4-06-537437-5
15	February 17, 2025	978-4-06-538424-4
16	May 16, 2025	978-4-06-539834-0
17	August 12, 2025	978-4-06-540368-6
18	November 17, 2025	978-4-06-541546-7
19	February 17, 2026	978-4-06-542630-2
20	May 15, 2026	978-4-06-543629-5
21	August 17, 2026	978-4-06-544641-6
22	November 17, 2026	978-4-06-545700-9

== Reception ==
It was reported along with the release of the 18th volume that the series had sold over 700,000 copies. Writing for Bunshun Online in 2023, Yoshihisa Tsukui and Naoto Oguma mentioned the series in their list of baseball manga they were interested in, speculating that it would become popular among women.
