= Do You Like Big Girls? =

Japanese manga series

- First tankōbon volume cover, featuring Sota Tachibana (below) and Ayano Hasegawa (above)

大きい女の子は好きですか? (Ōkī Onnanoko wa Suki desu ka?)
- Genre: Romantic comedy; Sports
- Manga
- Written by: Goro Aizome
- Published by: Takeshobo
- English publisher: NA: Seven Seas Entertainment
- Imprint: Bamboo Comics
- Magazine: Monthly Kissca (January 8, 2014 – January 8, 2022); Web Comic Gamma Plus (February 18 – November 4, 2022); Takecomic (December 19, 2025 – present)
- Original run: January 8, 2014 – present
- Volumes: 8
- Live-action film
- Directed by: Takafumi Ōhashi
- Written by: Toru Yanagisawa; Takeo Matagi
- Released: August 1, 2020
- Anime television series
- Directed by: Sōta Warai
- Written by: Eeyo Kurosaki
- Studio: Studio Hōkiboshi
- Licensed by: OceanVeil
- Original network: Tokyo MX, BS11 (censored)
- Original run: April 6, 2026 (Note: The series debuted online on AnimeFesta and DMM TV on March 13, 2026, while its televised broadcast premiered on April 6 of the same year.) – June 22, 2026
- Episodes: 12
- icon

Do You Like Big Girls? (Japanese: 大きい女の子は好きですか?, Hepburn: Ōkī Onnanoko wa Suki desu ka?) is a Japanese manga series written and illustrated by Goro Aizome. It was serialized in Takeshobo's seinen manga magazine Monthly Kissca from January 2014 to January 2022, later transferred to the Web Comic Gamma Plus website, where it ran from February to November 2022, and later continued on the Takecomic website in December 2025. A live-action film adaptation opened in Japan in August 2020. An anime television series adaptation, produced by Studio Hōkiboshi, debuted online in March 2026 and aired on television from April to June of the same year.

== Plot ==
Sota Tachibana, a diminutive young man, discovers that his older sister, Kaoru, has roped him into becoming the interim coach for her college's women's volleyball team, which she is a member of, and hall director of their dormitory. Among her teammates includes Ayano Hasekawa, a girl he has had a crush on for years. Once the team takes a liking to him, Sota finds himself dealing with them constantly.

== Characters ==
Sota Tachibana (立花草太, Tachibana Sōta)
Voiced by: Rin Hinishi (Japanese); Adam Curley (English)
Portrayed by: Ken Aoyama
A young man who becomes the acting coach of his sister's college volleyball team after the actual coach is hospitalized. However, he soon finds that the other girls are all massive perverts who are sexually interested in him, which he does not resist since he likes tall girls. He is also very insecure about his short stature, to the point of throwing a tantrum whenever someone calls it out.
Ayano Hasegawa (長谷川綾乃, Hasegawa Ayano)
Voiced by: Sui Mizushiro (Japanese); Leah Booth (English)
Portrayed by: Rena Takei
A member of the volleyball team. She is Sota's first love, whom he developed feelings for at first sight. However, while appearing to be a kind young woman, she is actually a pansexual pervert who quickly seduces and forces herself onto Sota. She also harbors lustful feelings toward her own teammates.
Kaoru Tachibana (立花薫, Tachibana Kaoru)
Voiced by: Kanna Natsuki (Japanese); Angel Haven Rey (English)
Portrayed by: Senna Natsuki
Sota's older sister and acting captain of the volleyball team in Sanae's absence. While constantly teasing her brother about his short stature, she becomes flustered as her teammates become sexually interested in him. It is later revealed that she herself actually harbors romantic feelings for him as well, though she refuses to admit it.
Sanae Yamada (山田早苗, Yamada Sanae)
Voiced by: Hana Mameshiba (Japanese); Brittany Juilfs (English)
Portrayed by: Aika Mizuike
The captain and libero of the volleyball team, who is far smaller than the other members, even shorter than Sota, which helps with her position. She later becomes overweight as a result of overeating, but she eventually returns to her former, slim physique.
Sakura Asakura (朝倉桜, Asakura Sakura)
Voiced by: Suyako Inemuri (Japanese); Alexandria Loverro (English)
Portrayed by: Moa Hirabayashi
A member of the volleyball team. She is an otaku whose weird mannerisms and tall physique have always made her an outcast, until she met her teammates, who accepted her for who she is.
Kyoka Teshigawara (勅使河原鏡花, Teshigawara Kyōka)
Voiced by: Aki Nagatsuki (Japanese); Mana T. Johnson (English)
Portrayed by: Usako Kurusu
A member of the volleyball team. She has a flat figure, which she was initially insecure about to the point of using padding to cover it up. However, she later comes to terms with her physique and cuts her hair short, becoming a tomboy.
Julia McKenzie (ユリア・マッケンジー, Yuria Makkenjī)
Voiced by: Noeru Kanzaki (Japanese); Meredith Nudo (English)
Portrayed by: Maria Sano
A member of the volleyball team. The tallest and bustiest of the girls, she is a foreigner from the United States and a famous basketball player who switched to volleyball. She later also becomes a stand-in player for her college's basketball team after they discover her identity.

== Media ==
=== Manga ===
Written and illustrated by Goro Aizome, Do You Like Big Girls? began serialization in Takeshobo's seinen manga magazine Monthly Kissca on January 8, 2014. When Monthly Kissca ceased its publication on January 8, 2022, the manga was transferred over to the Web Comic Gamma Plus website on February 18 of the same year; its 78th and last chapter on the platform was published on November 4 of that same year. In October 2025, Takeshobo retired Web Comic Gamma Plus and its three other webcomic websites and consolidated series from those sites onto their new platform, Takecomic, where Do You Like Big Girls? resumed publication on December 19 of that same year. Takeshobo has collected its chapters into individual tankōbon volumes. The first volume was released on October 7, 2014. As of June 23, 2022, eight volumes have been released.

In North America, Seven Seas Entertainment licensed the manga and it is being released under their Ghost Ship mature imprint. The first volume was released on October 5, 2021. In March 2024, Seven Seas Entertainment announced an 2-in-1 omnibus edition, with the first volume released on August 20 of the same year.

==== Volumes ====
No.	Original release date	Original ISBN	English release date	English ISBN
1	October 7, 2014	978-4-8019-5000-9	October 5, 2021 (volume); August 20, 2024 (omnibus)	978-1-64827-606-4 (volume); 979-8-89160-604-3 (omnibus)
1. "A Fateful Reunion!!" (運命の再会!!, Unmei no saikai!!); 2. "Sota, the Beast Unleashed" (草太、野獣と化す, Sōta, yajū to kasu); 3. "Do You Like Small Girls, Too?" (ちっちゃい女の子も好きですか?, Chicchai onnanoko mo suki desu ka?); 4. "An Innocent Girl with Specs" (眼鏡っ娘純情, Meganemmusume junjō); 5. "A Late-Night Scuffle" (真夜中の対決, Shin yonaka no taiketsu); 6. "Flat-Chested Interrogation" (貧乳問答, Hinnyū mondō); 7. "Battle of the Maidens!" (乙女の戦い!, Otome no tatakai!); 8. "Confession of the Heart" (告白の時, Kokuhaku no toki)
2	May 27, 2015	978-4-8019-5265-2	November 30, 2021 (volume); August 20, 2024 (omnibus)	978-1-64827-637-8 (volume); 979-8-89160-604-3 (omnibus)
9. "Boob Duty" (おっぱい当番, Oppai tōban); 10. "The Melancholy of Ayano" (綾乃の憂鬱, Ayano no yūutsu); 11. "Revenge of the Ex" (元カノ来襲, Gen kano raishū); 12. "Her Circumstances" (カノジョの事情, Kanojo no jijō); 13. "All's Fair in Ropes and Bondage" (ネット際の攻防, Netto sai no kōbō); 14. "Kaoru's True Love" (薫の本気, Kaoru no honki); 15. "Sibling Rivalry" (姉と弟, Ane to otōto); 16. "A Complicated Relationship" (こじらせ姉弟, Kojirase shitei)
3	April 7, 2016	978-4-8019-5498-4	March 8, 2022 (volume); December 24, 2024 (omnibus)	978-1-63858-152-9 (volume); 979-8-89160-605-0 (omnibus)
17. "One Night Stand" (姉弟一夜, Shitei ichiya); 18. "Love and Desire" (情と欲, Jō to yoku); 19. "Hair Revolution" (ﾍｱ革命, Hea kakumei); 20. "I Do What I Want" (ｽｷな理由, Suki na riyū); 21. "A Cinematic Wonderland Part 1" (ｼﾈﾏ･ﾊﾟﾗﾀﾞｲｽ, Shinema paradaisu); 22. "A Cinematic Wonderland Part 2" (ｼﾈﾏ･ﾊﾟﾗﾀﾞｲｽII, Shinema paradaisu 2); 23. "Brave Adventures" (冒険者たち, Bōken-sha-tachi); 24. "Hairless and Free" (無毛痴帯, Mumō chitai); 25. "The Art of Ahegao" (ｱﾍ顔談義, Ae kao dangi)
4	May 17, 2017	978-4-8019-5935-4	June 14, 2022 (volume); December 24, 2024 (omnibus)	978-1-63858-310-3 (volume); 979-8-89160-605-0 (omnibus)
26. "Memories of a Heartbeat" (恋騒のメモリー, Koi sawagi no memorī); 27. "Sister ✰ Magic" (シスター☆マジック, Shisutā ☆ majikku); 28. "Boobie Harem ♡" (パイパイハーレム, Pai pai hāremu); 29. "Awakened by a Sister's Love!" (呼び起こせ姉ゴコロ!, Yobiokose ane gokoro!); 30. "Play Pig Part II (1)"; 31. "Play Pig Part II (2)"; 32. "Play Pig Part II (3)"; 33. "A Discourse of Tightness" (シマリ談義, Shimari dangi); 34. "Beyond Love and Like" (LOVEもLIKEも超えて, LOVE mo LIKE mo koete); 35. "First Love ♡ Caught in a Web of Urgency" (初恋 尿意網, Hatsukoi nyōi-mō); 36. "To Suck? Or to Milk?!" (サックユー? 搾乳!?, Sakku yū? Sakunyū!?); Bonus: "Amazonians!"
5	April 27, 2018	978-4-8019-6248-4	November 15, 2022 (volume); April 22, 2025 (omnibus)	978-1-63858-675-3 (volume); 979-8-89160-934-1 (omnibus)
37. "Operation: We Need Boowbies!!" (新乳部員ゲット作戦！！, Shin nyū buin getto sakusen!!); 38. "Come on Down to the Welcome Party ♪" (おいでよ新歓コンパ, O ideyo shinkan konpa); 39. "The Birth of the Infamous Club Crusher!!" (伝説の壊し屋誕生!!, Densetsu no kowashi ya tanjō!!); 40. "Welcome to Suzuki Villa ♥" (涼風荘にようこそ♥, Ryōfū-sō ni yō koso♥); 41. "I've Got a Date with a Girl (?)" (私は今日、♀の彼とデートする, Watakushi wa kyō, ♀ no kare to deito suru); 42. "A Nomadic Girl's Journey" (放浪娘、旅に出る。, Hōrō musume, tabi ni deru.); 43. "An Unexpected Rival Appears!!" (思わぬ強敵です!!, Omowanu kyōteki desu!!); 44. "If It Doesn't Fit, I'll Make It!" (入れて見せようホトトギス!, Irete miseyō hototogisu!); 45. "Neechan, Let's Practice ♥" (お姉ちゃん、練習します, O ane-chan, renshū shimasu); 46. "The Case of the Extra-Juicy Bathwater?!!" (愛液混入事件!!?, Aieki konnyū jiken!!?)
6	April 27, 2020	978-4-8019-6927-8	March 21, 2023 (volume); April 22, 2025 (omnibus)	978-1-63858-905-1 (volume); 979-8-89160-934-1 (omnibus)
47. "Mission: Memory Overwrite?!" (記憶上書きミッション!?", Kioku uwagaki misshon!?); 48. "Overcoming Mommy Issues" (ママから始める克服講座, Mama kara hajimeru kokufuku kōza); 49. "A Young Slut's Firsthand Try at Molesting ♡" (痴的系女子の痴漢体験, Oroka teki kei joshi no chikan taiken); 50. "The Coach Is Discharged! But Then..." (監督退院!!そして..., Kantoku taiin!! Soshite...); 51. "The Start of Tumultuous Journey?!" (新たな航路は前途多難!?, Arata na kōro wa zento tanan!?); 52. "A Long Road to Victory" (勝利への長い道のり, Shōri e no nagai michinori); 53. "Escaping into Our Fantasies" (夢の中へ, Yume no naka e); 54. "Where Is She Now?" (あの人は今, Ano hito haima); 55. "From the Great North" (北の国から, Kita no kuni kara); 56. "A Fateful Rematch" (偶然の再戦, Gūzen no saisen); 57. "The Unstoppable Tank of the Team!!" (鉄壁女子見参!!, Teppeki joshi kenzan!!); 58. "The Final Battle! And Then..." (決戦、そして..., Kessen, soshite...)
7	April 30, 2021	978-4-8019-7291-9	June 6, 2023 (volume); August 19, 2025 (omnibus)	978-1-68579-538-2 (volume); 979-8-89373-370-9 (omnibus)
59. "Operation: Beauty Pageant" (ミスコン攻略大作戦, Misukon kōryaku dai sakusen); 60. "The Formula for Victory" (勝利の方程式, Shōri no hōteishiki); 61. "S Is for 'I'm Sorry'" (シは謝罪のシ, Shi wa shazai no shi); 62. "The Space between Chastity and Lust" (貞節と欲情のあいだ, Teisetsu to yokujō no aida); 63. "The Handbook of a Horny Slut" (欲情乙女練習帳, Yokujō otome renshūchō); 64. "Pride and Marshmallows" (マシュマロとプライド, Mashumaro to puraido); 65. "Say My Name" (君の名は, Kiminonaha); 66. "If Only My Tears Made Me Stronger" (涙の数だけ強くなれたら, Namida no kazu dake tsuyoku naretara); 67. "Unforgettable..." (忘れじの..., Wasureji no...)
8	June 23, 2022	978-4-8019-7666-5	September 19, 2023 (volume); August 19, 2025 (omnibus)	979-8-88843-015-6 (volume); 979-8-89373-370-9 (omnibus)
68. "Oasis"; 69. "Long and Lustrous Hair" (髪いと長くうるはしく, Kami ito nagaku uru wa shiku); 70. "The Ultimate (?) Glow Up?" (大和撫子? 七変化, Yamato Nadeshiko? Shichihenge); 71. "Second Impact" (セカンドインパクト, Sekandoinpakuto); 72. "The Disappearance of Tachibana Sota" (立花草太の消失, Tachibana Sōta no shōshitsu); 73. "The Death of a Dick" (チン事中天, Chin koto chūten); 74. "Secrets Between Twins" (ツインズシークレット, Tsuinzushīkuretto); 75. "Tales of the Grotesque: The Mummy Girl's Bandages" (怪奇! ミイラ女の巻, Kaiki! Mīra on'na no maki); 76. "A Matter of Life and Death in the Hostile Great North" (試される大地の死活問題, Tamesa reru daichi no shikatsumondai); 77. "Exit Stage Left" (ご・退・散, Go shisa chi)

=== Live-action film ===
A live-action film adaptation, starring Senna Natsuki and Rena Takei, was released in Japan on August 1, 2020.

=== Anime ===
In December 2025, it was announced that the series would receive an anime television series adaptation as part of AnimeFesta. The series is produced by Studio Hōkiboshi and directed by Sōta Warai, with Eeyo Kurosaki handling series composition and Nagae Ashitaka designing the characters. The series debuted on AnimeFesta, which began streaming both the "Premium Version" and the "On-Air Version" on March 13, 2026; DMM TV also started streaming the "On-Air Version" on the same day. The televised broadcast aired on Tokyo MX and BS11 from April 6 to June 22, 2026. (Note: Tokyo MX and BS11 listed the series' television premiere on April 5 at 25:05, effectively April 6 at 1:05 a.m. JST.) The series' theme song is "Sekai ni Hitotsu no Gift" (世界にひとつのギフト; lit. 'A Single Gift for the World'), performed by Mitsuki Nakae. OceanVeil is streaming the series in English.

==== Episodes ====
No.	Title	Original release date
1	"Episode 1"	April 6, 2026
The diminutive Sota Tachibana goes with his stepsister Kaoru to her volleyball team made of abnormally tall girls. He is introduced to team members Julia McKenzie, Sakura Asakura, Kyoka Teshigawara, and his crush, Ayano Hasegawa. Kaoru tells Sota he will live in their dorm as their caretaker and coach. Sota and Kaoru later walk in on Ayano watching porn, and Kaoru convinces her to go on a date with Sota. After activities like shopping and going to a restaurant, they go to a hotel and have sex. Afterwards, he asks her to be his girlfriend.
2	"Episode 2"	April 13, 2026
Ayano turns Sota down, devastating him. When he tells Kaoru what happened, she confronts Ayano, who says she is only interested in sex. Sakura eavesdrops and then tells Julia and Kyoka that Sota is available. The three try to seduce him, but he ignores them. The three try to sneak into his room at night, but decide to compete to see who is allowed in. Ayano sneaks into his room and mocks him for being short, angering him into having rough sex with her, which was what she was aiming for. When they finish, he again tries to confess his feelings, but she leaves the room mid-sentence. Meanwhile, Sakura and Kyouko are still competing by playing cards while Julia has fallen asleep.
3	"Episode 3"	April 20, 2026
Sota notices they are one player short for a proper volleyball team, then the captain, Sanae Yamada, returns from dealing with family issues. Sota is surprised to find she is even shorter than him. The team goes shopping for groceries, then has a party in Sota's room to celebrate Sanae's return. Ayano embarrasses Sota by graphically describing the sex they had. When everyone falls asleep, Sota leaves the room to get some air, but Sanae follows and seduces him, saying she does not mind that he is sleeping with Ayano. After they have sex, she says she is willing to wait until he falls for her.
4	"Episode 4"	April 27, 2026
Sakura loses her glasses, and Sota returns them. She remembers doing bizarre comedy routines to ease her loneliness and how her diminutive childhood friend, Takeshi, tried to join the volleyball team, only to quit and leave her for another girl. During a game, she is hit in the face by a volleyball and breaks her glasses, injuring her left eye. Sota takes her to the infirmary and treats her injury. She seduces him. Afterwards, she blackmails him by threatening to tell the others they had sex into doing a bizarre comedy routine in front of Sanae and Kaoru, humiliating him.
5	"Episode 5"	May 4, 2026
The girls play strip mahjong in the middle of the night except for Kyoka, who refuses to play. Kaoru, who is quickly stripped to just her panties, wakes Sota up so he can play. They wager that whichever girl wins can do whatever they want with Sota that night, while if Sota wins, they must do his chores for a month. Ayano eventually gets bored and leaves the game. Kaoru wins in the end. She asks to share his bed. He tries to sleep, but she kisses him on the lips and dry humps him. She abruptly stops and leaves the room, leaving him shocked.
6	"Episode 6"	May 11, 2026
Kaoru just wants to forget about trying to seduce Sota, but when the others tease her, she angrily hurls a volleyball that strikes Kyoka. This exposes that Kyoka is wearing padding over her flat chest, making her run away in shame. Sota pursues her to a hotel where he assures that she is beautiful. She strips and orders him to massage her breasts, which escalates into them having sex. The next day, Kyoka embraces her masculine figure by no longer wearing padding and getting a boyish haircut, which makes Ayano hit on her.
7	"Episode 7"	May 18, 2026
The volleyball and basketball teams have booked the gym at the same time and refuse to share. Julia proposes they settle it with a basketball game, and if their team wins, she gets to spend the rest of the day with Sota. The volleyball team wins when Julia reveals she used to play basketball. Julia and Sota return to the dorm and have sex in the shower. The basketball captain asks Kaoru for permission to borrow Julia for an upcoming game. Sota contemplates that he has had sex with every member of the volleyball team except for Kaoru, then freaks out for even thinking sexual thoughts about his sister.
8	"Episode 8"	May 25, 2026
The group goes shopping, but everyone except for Sota and Sanae gets sidetracked. After getting everything they need, Julia wins a raffle for an all expenses paid trip to a hot spring for two. They allow Sota and Sanae to go. As they bathe, Sota says he got over his crush on Ayano and confesses his feelings for Sanae, leading them to have sex in the hot spring. He says he likes that Sanae is small enough to hold in his arms. Meanwhile, the other girls are getting drunk when Ayano suddenly kisses Kaoru on the lips, making her freak out.
9	"Episode 9"	June 1, 2026
It is Valentine's Day and Kyoka receives chocolate from female fans. The volleyball team decides to make chocolate for Sota, but Kaoru ends up giving him a small chocolate. In private, Ayano and Kaoru recall how their rivalry started when they were younger. Ayano suddenly kisses Kaoru on the lips, strips them both, and starts fingering her to an orgasm. Sota is shocked when he walks in on them. Ayano invites him to join them and taunts him for being short. Enraged, he charges at them, but Kaoru kicks him in the face and knocks him out.
10	"Episode 10"	June 8, 2026
Kaoru just wants to forget about Ayano seducing her and avoids her. Ayano and Sanae discuss that whenever they are alone with Kaoru or Sota, the only thing they talk about is each other, so they believe the two have feelings for each other. Kaoru runs into the streets to avoid Sota, but suffers from the cold since she did not get dressed. Sota catches up to her and asks her on a date, which she accepts. They buy winter clothes for her, go to a restaurant where she becomes drunk, then go to a hotel. Kaoru proceeds to drunkenly expose herself. Unable to resist temptation, Sota kisses her on the lips.
11	"Episode 11"	June 15, 2026
In a flashback, Kaoru defended Sota from bullies when they were younger. He lamented that he was too small and weak to fight, so she pretended to cast a spell to make him a berserker, and motivated him with a kiss on the lips. In the present, Sota continues to kiss Kaoru and fingers her. However, Kaoru is distracted by thinking of Ayano and becomes increasingly angry that Ayano always beats her at everything. As Sota is about to initiate sex, Kaoru suddenly knocks him out with a punch.
12	"Episode 12"	June 22, 2026
Sota got a bloody nose from being punched and Kaoru got a hangover. When they return to the dorm, Sota berates himself for trying to have sex with his sister. Kaoru insists to the others that nothing happened between them. During volleyball practice, Kaoru gets increasingly angry when the others keep flirting with Sota. Ayano later sneaks into his room and gives him a blowjob in his sleep until he wakes up, then they have sex. When Kaoru and Sanae walk in on them, Ayano invites them to join in, but Kaoru angrily calls her the worst.

== Reception ==
By August 2020, the manga had 500,000 copies in circulation.
