= Ban-Ō =

Japanese manga series

- First tankōbon volume cover

バンオウ-盤王-
- Genre: Sports (shogi)
- Manga
- Written by: Toshiya Watabiki
- Illustrated by: Garaku Akinai
- Published by: Shueisha
- Imprint: Jump Comics+
- Magazine: Shōnen Jump+
- Original run: December 16, 2022 – June 7, 2024
- Volumes: 8
- icon

Ban-Ō (Japanese: バンオウ-盤王-; lit. 'Board King') is a Japanese manga series written by Toshiya Watabiki and illustrated by Garaku Akinai. It was serialized on Shueisha's Shōnen Jump+ manga service from December 2022 to June 2024.

== Synopsis ==
The series is centered around a vampire bored with immortality discovering shogi and becoming so engrossed with the sport that he becomes an expert with 300 years of experience.

== Media ==
=== Manga ===
Written by Toshiya Watabiki and illustrated by Garaku Akinai, Ban-Ō was serialized on Shueisha's Shōnen Jump+ manga service from December 16, 2022, to June 7, 2024. Its chapters were collected into eight tankōbon volumes from April 4, 2023, to July 4, 2024.

No.	Release date	ISBN
1	April 4, 2023	978-4-08-883489-4
2	July 4, 2023	978-4-08-883620-1
3	September 4, 2023	978-4-08-883707-9
4	November 2, 2023	978-4-08-883774-1
5	February 2, 2024	978-4-08-883868-7
6	April 4, 2024	978-4-08-884062-8
7	June 4, 2024	978-4-08-884057-4
8	July 4, 2024	978-4-08-884096-3

=== Other ===
The series had a collaboration with the Shogi Wars mobile video game from October 13 to November 13, 2023.

== Reception ==
The series was nominated for the ninth Next Manga Awards in the web category in 2023, it was ranked 10th out of 61 nominees and won the U-NEXT Award. The series was ranked 2nd in the 2023 Manga Numa Awards hosted by comedians Akira Kawashima and Kenji Yamauchi.
