= Golden Sakura =

Japanese manga series

- Volume 1 cover, depicting Takuya as his female alter ego Sakura

ゴールデン桜
- Genre: Sports (mahjong), drama
- Manga
- Written by: Sayaka Okada
- Illustrated by: Kazuo Maekawa
- Published by: Takeshobo
- English publisher: NA: Mahjong Pros
- Imprint: Kindai Mahjong Comics
- Magazine: Kindai Mahjong
- Original run: December 29, 2018 – September 1, 2020
- Volumes: 3

Golden Sakura (Japanese: ゴールデン桜, Hepburn: Gōruden Sakura) is a sports manga series about mahjong, written by the professional mahjong player Sayaka Okada and drawn by Kazuo Maekawa. It was serialized by Takeshobo in the magazine Kindai Mahjong from December 29, 2018, to September 1, 2020, and collected in three tankōbon volumes in 2019–2020.

The story follows Takuya Saotome, who gets tricked into taking on debt, and in desperation resorts to a plan involving cross-dressing to earn money as a female professional mahjong player under the name Sakura Shindou. Okada got the opportunity to write the manga through her work as a columnist for Kindai Mahjong, and drew on her own experiences for the story. The manga was popular with readers, and was praised for its professional mahjong setting.

== Premise ==
Golden Sakura is a sports manga about mahjong. It follows Takuya Saotome, a skilled but low-earning and nearly unknown mahjong player, whose girlfriend tricks him into taking on five million yen in debt. He does not know how he will be able to repay the money, but Nabe, a friend running a gay bar, suggests a plan to earn money by becoming a female professional mahjong player. Desperate, Takuya agrees to it and retakes the professional mahjong player examination while cross-dressing as his new female persona Sakura Shindou, and has to continue playing both as himself and as Sakura.

== Production and release ==
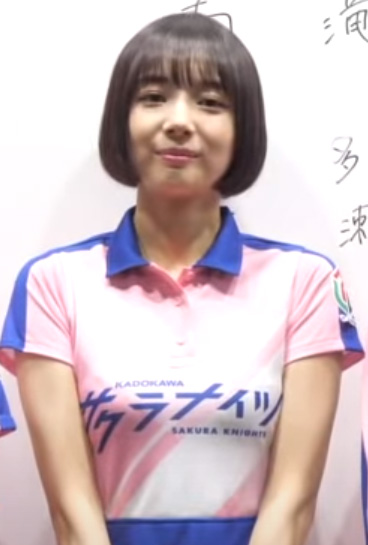
The manga was written by professional mahjong player Sayaka Okada.

Golden Sakura was written by professional mahjong player Sayaka Okada, and drawn by Ace Attorney manga artist Kazuo Maekawa. It was published by Takeshobo in their monthly mahjong-themed manga magazine Kindai Mahjong; the manga originated in how Okada was writing a column for Kindai Mahjong, and was asked by her editor if she would like to write an original manga for the magazine. She initially considered writing a story with fantasy elements about the world of female professional mahjong players, but after the professional mahjong landscape in Japan changed with the creation of the national M League competition, she re-planned the story to be about a male character disguising himself as a woman. She drew on her own experiences as a player for the scenarios, and did not find herself with a shortage of plot ideas, but at times found it challenging to make the plot move as quickly as her editor wanted.

Takeshobo serialized the manga from December 29, 2018, to September 1, 2020; the publisher has also collected the series in three tankōbon volumes released from September 30, 2019, to October 1, 2020, under their Kindai Mahjong Comics imprint. The first volume features a design where an illustration similar to the main cover is printed under the dust jacket, with Takuya appearing as himself rather than as Sakura; for the e-book version, this was added as a separate page at the end of the volume.

In a 2020 interview, Okada said that she hoped that the manga could see an anime adaptation, for which she wanted Megumi Ogata to be cast as Takuya, and Sora Tokui as another character.

During their panel at Anime Expo 2026, Mahjong Pros announced that they had licensed the series for English publication, with the first volume set to release in November later in the year.

=== Volumes ===
No.	Release date	ISBN
1	September 30, 2019	978-4801967564
Chapter 1–7
2	April 1, 2020	978-4801968646
Chapter 8–14
3	October 1, 2020	978-4801971080
Chapter 15–21

== Reception ==
The series drew attention for being written by Okada, and ranked among Manga Navi's list of popular male-to-female cross-dressing manga as of December 2021; according to Okada, it was primarily popular with mahjong enthusiasts, however, and none of the print volumes debuted on the weekly Oricon top 30 charts for comic book sales in Japan. Mahjong Watch found it interesting to see Okada and Maekawa co-operate on a manga, and thought that Okada managed to faithfully depict the realities of the professional mahjong world due to her personal experience, despite the story's unrealistic premise; MJ Dragon, too, recommended the manga for its setting. Mystery author Yukito Ayatsuji found the series interesting, and recommended it, as did mahjong writer and M League chairman Susumu Fujita.
