= Eiji (manga) =

Japanese manga series and its OVA adaptation

- Volume cover

エイジ
- Genre: Comedy, sports
- Manga
- Written by: Hisashi Eguchi
- Published by: Shueisha
- Imprint: Jump Comics
- Magazine: Fresh Jump
- Original run: 1984 – 1985
- Volumes: 1
- Original video animation
- Directed by: Mizuho Nishikubo
- Written by: Tomoya Miyashita; Yasuyuki Suzuki
- Studio: I.G Tatsunoko
- Released: August 25, 1990
- Runtime: 45 minutes
- icon

Eiji (エイジ) is a Japanese manga series written and illustrated by Hisashi Eguchi. It was serialized in Shueisha's shōnen manga magazine Fresh Jump from 1984 to 1985.

== Media ==
=== Manga ===
Written and illustrated by Hisashi Eguchi, Eiji was serialized in Shueisha's shōnen manga magazine Fresh Jump from 1984 to 1985. Shueisha collected its chapters in a single volume, which was released on July 15, 1985. It was followed by two short sequels; Eiji '85 and Eiji 2. Shueisha released a bunkoban edition, which included the previous stories, on February 18, 2004. Shogakukan re-released the series in a complete edition on August 2, 2010.

=== Original video animation ===
Eiji was adapted into a 45-minute original video animation (OVA) episode by I.G Tatsunoko and directed by Mizuho Nishikubo, released on August 25, 1990.
