= Chihaya Re:Start! =

Japanese manga series

- First tankōbon volume cover

チハヤリスタート！ (Chihaya Risutāto!)
- Genre: Sports
- Manga
- Written by: Hollow Takeuchi
- Published by: Houbunsha
- English publisher: NA: Yen Press
- Imprint: FUZ Comics
- Magazine: Comic Fuz
- Original run: July 25, 2024 – present
- Volumes: 5

Chihaya Re:Start! (Japanese: チハヤリスタート！, Hepburn: Chihaya Risutāto!) is a Japanese manga series written and illustrated by Hollow Takeuchi. It began serialization on Houbunsha's Comic Fuz manga website in July 2024.

== Synopsis ==
In elementary school, Chihaya Sakurazaka was the fastest girl in her school in track and field. As she moved on to middle school, she met Mio Koshimizu, a girl who would become her rival in track and field. The two would attend different high schools and vowed to face each other in the Inter High Championships. However, the event gets cancelled due to the COVID-19 pandemic. The effects of the cancellation were damaging to Chihaya as she would end up becoming a NEET at 25 years old. After a reunion with Mio and her other track and field club members, Chihaya regains her desire to run.

== Publication ==
Written and illustrated by Hollow Takeuchi, Chihaya Re:Start! began serialization on Houbunsha's Comic Fuz manga website on July 25, 2024. Its chapters have been compiled into five tankōbon volumes as of August 2026.

During their panel at Anime Expo 2026, Yen Press announced that they had licensed the series for English publication.

No.	Original release date	Original ISBN	North American release date	North American ISBN
1	April 28, 2025	978-4-8322-0506-2	January 26, 2027	979-8-8554-3719-5
2	June 2, 2025	978-4-8322-0515-4	—	—
3	November 4, 2025	978-4-8322-0556-7	—	—
4	March 2, 2026	978-4-8322-0593-2	—	—
5	August 3, 2026	978-4-8322-0638-0	—	—

== Reception ==
The series was nominated for the twelfth Next Manga Award in 2026 in the web category.
