= Waru =

Waru or WARU may refer to:

== Arts ==
=== Films ===
- Waru (2006 film), a 2006 film directed by Takashi Miike
- Waru (2017 film), a 2017 New Zealand film
- Waru: kanketsu-hen, a 2006 sequel film by Takashi Miike

=== Other creative arts ===
- Waru (manga), a manga by Jun Fukami
- Waru – journey of the small turtle, a 2023 theatre/dance work for children by Indigenous Australian dance company Bangarra Dance Theatre
- Waru - 1970 manga by Hisao Maki & Jōya Kagemaru; 2006 film Waru is based upon it

== Locations ==
- Waru, Pamekasan, in Pamekasan Regency, East Java
- Waru, Penajam North Paser, in Penajam North Paser Regency, East Kalimantan
- Waru, Sidoarjo, in Sidoarjo Regency, East Java
  - Waru railway station, railway station in Waru, Sidoarjo Regency

== Radio stations ==
- WARU (AM), a defunct radio station (1600 AM) formerly licensed to Peru, Indiana, United States
- WARU-FM, a radio station (101.9 FM) licensed to Roann, Indiana

== Other uses ==
- Waru language, an Austronesian language of Indonesia
- Waru waru, a native South American agricultural method
- Waru, Indonesian name for Hibiscus tiliaceus
