= Takashi Yamada =

Japanese sailor

Personal information
- Nationality: Japanese
- Born: 2 October 1938 (age 86)

Sport
- Sport: Sailing

Takashi Yamada (born 2 October 1938) is a Japanese sailor. He competed in the Finn event at the 1964 Summer Olympics.
