= Tsuyoshi (manga) =

Japanese manga series

- Tsuyoshi: Daremo Katenai, Aitsu ni wa
- First tankōbon volume cover

TSUYOSHI 誰も勝てない、アイツには
- Genre: Martial arts
- Manga
- Written by: Kyōsuke Maruyama
- Published by: Cygames; Shogakukan
- Imprint: Ura Shōnen Sunday Comics
- Magazine: Cycomi
- Original run: November 29, 2018 – present
- Volumes: 32

Tsuyoshi: Daremo Katenai, Aitsu ni wa (TSUYOSHI 誰も勝てない、アイツには; "Tsuyoshi: Against Him, No One Can Win") is a Japanese manga series written and illustrated by Kyōsuke Maruyama. It began serialization on Cygames' Cycomi manga website and app in November 2018.

== Plot ==
Hoshizaki Ainosuke is the winner of the All Japan University Karate Championship, but is disappointed when he learns that his rival Yumeoka Teru did not defend the championship title - and that he had given up karate altogether after meeting Kawabata Tsuyoshi, an impossibly strong fighter who appears to be a scrawny 24-hour convenience store worker. As word spreads about Tsuyoshi, who is constantly fending off challengers who come to his store to fight him, secret martial arts agencies from Russia, China and Japan work to try to recruit him to their ranks, and Ainosuke and Teru inevitably get involved trying to support Tsuyoshi against various agencies who have their own designs for him.

== Media ==
=== Manga ===
Written and illustrated by Kyōsuke Maruyama, Tsuyoshi: Daremo Katenai, Aitsu ni wa began serialization on Cygames' Cycomi manga website and app on November 29, 2018. Its chapters have been compiled by Shogakukan into thirty-two tankōbon volumes as of October 2026.

No.	Release date	ISBN
1	December 19, 2019	978-4-09-129493-7
2	March 19, 2020	978-4-09-850029-1
3	May 19, 2020	978-4-09-850050-5
4	August 19, 2020	978-4-09-850233-2
5	October 16, 2020	978-4-09-850303-2
6	December 18, 2020	978-4-09-850353-7
7	February 19, 2021	978-4-09-850443-5
8	March 19, 2021	978-4-09-850448-0
9	April 19, 2021	978-4-09-850538-8
10	June 17, 2021	978-4-09-850585-2
11	July 16, 2021	978-4-09-850588-3
12	November 18, 2021	978-4-09-850776-4
13	January 19, 2022	978-4-09-850779-5
14	May 18, 2022	978-4-09-851046-7
15	August 19, 2022	978-4-09-851217-1
16	November 17, 2022	978-4-09-851378-9
17	March 17, 2023	978-4-09-851556-1
18	June 19, 2023	978-4-09-852082-4
19	September 19, 2023	978-4-09-852813-4
20	December 19, 2023	978-4-09-853066-3
21	February 19, 2024	978-4-09-853134-9
22	May 17, 2024	978-4-09-853320-6
23	August 19, 2024	978-4-09-853512-5
24	October 18, 2024	978-4-09-853619-1
25	January 17, 2025	978-4-09-853790-7
26	April 17, 2025	978-4-09-854062-4
27	July 17, 2025	978-4-09-854164-5
28	October 17, 2025	978-4-09-854268-0
29	January 19, 2026	978-4-09-854421-9
30	April 17, 2026	978-4-09-854495-0
31	July 17, 2026	978-4-09-854662-6
32	October 19, 2026	978-4-09-854823-1

=== Other ===
The series had a collaboration with kickboxer Tenshin Nasukawa in August 2019.

== Reception ==
The series had over 5 million copies in circulation by January 2025.
