= Shinji Morisue =

Japanese gymnast (born 1957)

- Born: May 22, 1957 (age 69) Okayama, Okayama
- Height: 5 ft 7 in (170 cm)

Gymnastics career
- Discipline: Men's artistic gymnastics
- Country represented: Japan
- Retired: 1985
Medal record
Representing Japan
Olympic Games
Gold medal – first place	1984 Los Angeles	Horizontal Bar
Silver medal – second place	1984 Los Angeles	Vault
Bronze medal – third place	1984 Los Angeles	Team
World Championships
Bronze medal – third place	1983 Budapest	Team
Asian Games
Silver medal – second place	1982 New Delhi	Team
Silver medal – second place	1982 New Delhi	Horizontal Bar

Shinji Morisue (森末 慎二, Morisue Shinji; born May 22, 1957) is a Japanese gymnast and Olympic champion. The parallel bar skill Morisue is named after him.

== Early life ==
Morisue hails from Okayama City and attended the Nippon College of Physical Education (now called Nippon Sport Science University).

== Olympics ==
He received a gold medal in horizontal bar, a silver medal in vault, and a bronze medal in team combined exercises at the 1984 Summer Olympics in Los Angeles.

== World championships ==
Morisue received a bronze medal with the Japan team in the 1983 World Artistic Gymnastics Championships in Budapest.

== Post sports career ==
Morisue is now a show business personality in Japan and is frequently seen on TV, especially in sports programs, and to comment on the Olympics and other international competitions. In April, 2006 he was appointed professor at Kyushu Kyoritsu University.

== Writer ==
In the early nineties amateur athletes have decreased. Morisue, concerned about the phenomenon of the moment, wrote the scenarios for the sports manga Ganba! Fly High, based in part on his experiences as a gymnast, for which he and the illustrator Hiroyuki Kikuta received the 1998 Shogakukan Manga Award for shōnen manga.

== Filmography ==
Year	Title	Role	Notes
1991	Godzilla vs. King Ghidorah	Camera operator	
2002	Godzilla Against MechaGodzilla	JXSDF 1st Lieutenant Hayama (2nd Lt. Hayama's Brother)	Romaji: Gojira tai Mekagojira
