= Yoban Sādo =

Japanese manga series by Gosho Aoyama

- Volume cover

4番サード
- Genre: Sports
- Manga
- Written by: Gosho Aoyama
- Published by: Shogakukan
- Imprint: Shōnen Sunday Comics
- Magazine: Shōnen Sunday Zōkan
- Original run: January 1991 – February 1993
- Volumes: 1
- icon

Yoban Sādo (4番サード; lit. '3rd Base 4th') is a Japanese sports manga series written and illustrated by Gosho Aoyama. It was published in Shogakukan's shōnen manga magazine Shōnen Sunday Zōkan from 1991 to 1993, with its chapters collected in a single tankōbon volume. The story depicts the final tournament of high school baseball, at the Koshien Stadium in Nishinomiya. The story's main characters are the high school baseball players Shigeo Nagashima and Kazuhisa Inao, whose names are taken from real-life Japanese baseball players Shigeo Nagashima and Kazuhisa Inao.

Aoyama referenced the story in his Case Closed manga in volumes 43 and 44 (chapters 445–449).

== Plot ==
Shigeo Nagashima (長島 茂雄, Nagashima Shigeo) is a high school baseball player who shares the name of a prolific baseball player. Initially underperforming, his fortune change when he acquires the God's Bat (神様のバット, Kamisama no Batto), a supernatural artifact containing the power of Babe Ruth. Empowered by the bat, Shigeo propels his team to Kōshien, displaying incredible prowess at the plate. However, the final match introduces a formidable opponent, the pitcher Kazuhisa Inao (稲尾 一久, Inao Kazuhisa) (name of a real-life pitcher), armed with a glove carrying the spirit of Eiji Sawamura, one of Japan's most revered pitchers. The story culminates in a high-stakes duel between two players wielding the essence of baseball legends, testing their skill, determination, and the limits of their supernatural gifts.

== Publication ==
Written and illustrated by Gosho Aoyama, Yoban Sādo was published for six chapters in Shogakukan's shōnen manga magazine Shōnen Sunday Zōkan from the January 1991 to the February 1993 issues. Shogakukan collected its chapters in a single tankōbon volume, published under the Shōnen Sunday Comics imprint on March 18, 1993. A second edition was published under the Shōnen Sunday Books imprint on December 10, 1999. A third edition was published under the Shogakukan Bunko imprint on September 13, 2003.

=== Chapters ===
No.	Japanese release date	Japanese ISBN
1	March 18, 1993	4-09-123171-3
1. "The Miraculous Bat" (奇跡のバット, Kiseki no Batto); 2. "Bring Me the Koshien" (甲子園に連れてって, Kōshien ni Tsuretette); 3. "Have Faith in Yourself" (自信をもって, Jishin o Motte); 4. "Bring it Down! Smart Baseball" (打倒! 頭脳野球, Datō! Zunō Yakyū); 5. "The Strike of Anger" (怒りの一打, Ikari no Ichida); 6. "The Legendary Showdown" (伝説の対決, Densetsu no Taiketsu)
