= Animal Olympic Games =

1928 film

動物オリムピック大会
- Anime
- Directed by: Yasuji Murata
- Released: 1928

Animal Olympic Games (動物オリムピック大会, Dōbutsu Orimupikku Taikai) is a Japanese animated short film from 1928. It was directed and animated by Yasuji Murata for Yokohama Cinema Shōkai.

== Plot ==
At the Olympic Games of animals, the most diverse species of animals compete in the sporting disciplines. Monkeys do gymnastics on the horizontal bar, bears and hippos swim and kangaroos and pigs fight against each other. In the 800 m run, a duck wins against a bulldog, a hippopotamus and a camel. A polar bear enters the pole vault and the pigs try to gain an advantage in the hurdles with balloons, but crash.

== Production and release ==
The film was inspired by the 1928 Summer Olympics in Amsterdam, and was made in Yasuji Murata's film studio, Yokohama Cinema Shōkai. Murata himself was director and responsible for the animation. The work is considered his most important. The script was written by Chūzō Aochi and the animators were Koji Iida and Yukikiyo Ueno.

The film was admitted on 4 November 1928 by the Japanese Censorship Board and then presented in Japanese cinemas.
