= Yasuji Murata =

Animator

Yasuji Murata (村田安司, Murata Yasuji; 24 January 1896, Yokohama, Japan – 2 November 1966) was a pioneering animator who helped develop the art of anime in Japan. Studying the animation techniques of Sanae Yamamoto, Murata produced dozens of mostly educational films at the Yokohama Cinema studio featuring such characters as Momotarō and Norakuro. Along with Noburō Ōfuji, he was renowned as a master of cutout animation. Among his students were such animators as Yoshitarō Kataoka.

== Selected filmography ==
Taro's Train (1929) Tarō-san no kisha

Animal Olympics (1928) Dōbutsu Orinpikku taikai

At The Circus (1931)

Monkey and the Crabs (1927)

The Ugly Duckling (1932)

Private Norakuro in Boot Camp (1933)

Corporal Norakuro (1934)

Momotaro in the Sky (1931)

Momotaro under the Sea (1932)
See more on Commons
