= Sports manga =

Japanese comics genre

Sports manga (Japanese: スポーツ漫画) is a genre of Japanese manga and anime that focuses on stories involving sports and other athletic and competitive pursuits. Though Japanese animated works depicting sports were released as early as the 1920s, sports manga did not emerge as a discrete category until the early 1950s. The genre achieved prominence in the context of the post-war occupation of Japan, and gained significant visibility during and subsequent to the 1964 Summer Olympics in Tokyo. Noted as among the most popular genres of manga and anime, sports manga is credited with introducing new sports to Japan, and popularizing existing sports.

== Characteristics ==
=== Narrative ===
The core element of a sports manga series is a depiction of a specific sport. The genre is inclusive of a breadth of sports that are both Japanese and non-Japanese in origin, including sports with mainstream popularity (e.g. baseball, association football, boxing, cycling), comparably niche and esoteric sports (e.g. street racing, rhythmic gymnastics, table tennis, wheelchair basketball), and other broadly competitive activities and pursuits (e.g. billiards, shogi, mahjong, go).

A popular formula for sports manga stories is spo-kon (ja:スポ根), a portmanteau of sports and konjō (根性; lit. 'guts' or 'determination'). In these stories, a hero from an often tragic background resolves as a child to become the "best in the world" at a sport, and trains themselves to increase their aptitude. The hero often seeks to emulate their father, or achieve a goal that their father was unable to accomplish. Often, the hero trains under the tutelage of a coach or father figure who is harsh and unforgiving in his training methods; the "oni coach" or "devil coach" is a common stock character in such stories. Other common story formulas include underdog characters who achieve success in the face of staggering odds, and amateurs who unexpectedly discover that they are naturally gifted at a sport.

Sports manga is a popular genre among young readers, particularly readers of shōnen manga (boys' comics). The typical structure of a sports manga story is one that is readily understood by younger audiences: conflict is sublimated into a sporting event, a climax is generated through the action of the sport, and the conflict ends with a literal or metaphorical finish line. Writer Paul Gravett notes that "in the end, a sports manga hero is bound to win, or lose well, so the thrill comes from reading how he overcomes all challenges with determination and honesty".

=== Themes and style ===
A panel from 3rd Base 4th by Gosho Aoyama. The speed lines, written sound effects, and unnatural elongation of the ball to indicate motion are all visual hallmarks of sports manga.

In Manga! Manga! The World of Japanese Comics, author Frederik L. Schodt argues that sports manga are distinguished from American and European sports comics in their focus on bushido-inspired themes and subject material that use sports as "a metaphor for human endeavor and testing of the spirit". Common themes in sports manga include friendship and camaraderie, teamwork and selflessness, steadfastness and determination, prevailing over hardships, and supokon-kei (a contraction of supōtsu-konjō-kei, which translates literally to 'willpower in-sports-genre').

The genre is additionally noted for its highly stylized depictions of the action of sports, such as jarring layouts, speed lines, sound effects, blurred and foreshortened figures, and cinematic-style framing. The 1968 television anime adaptation of Star of the Giants is credited with pioneering many "special effects" now common in anime, such as time stops, slowdowns, extreme closeups, and the narrowing of the screen in moments of heightened drama.

Decompression is a common storytelling technique used in sports manga to heighten drama and suspense, with individual games or events frequently lasting hundreds of pages or multiple episodes. The manga series Slam Dunk, for example, is noted for presenting a four-month high-school basketball season over the course of six years' worth of weekly serialized stories.

== History ==
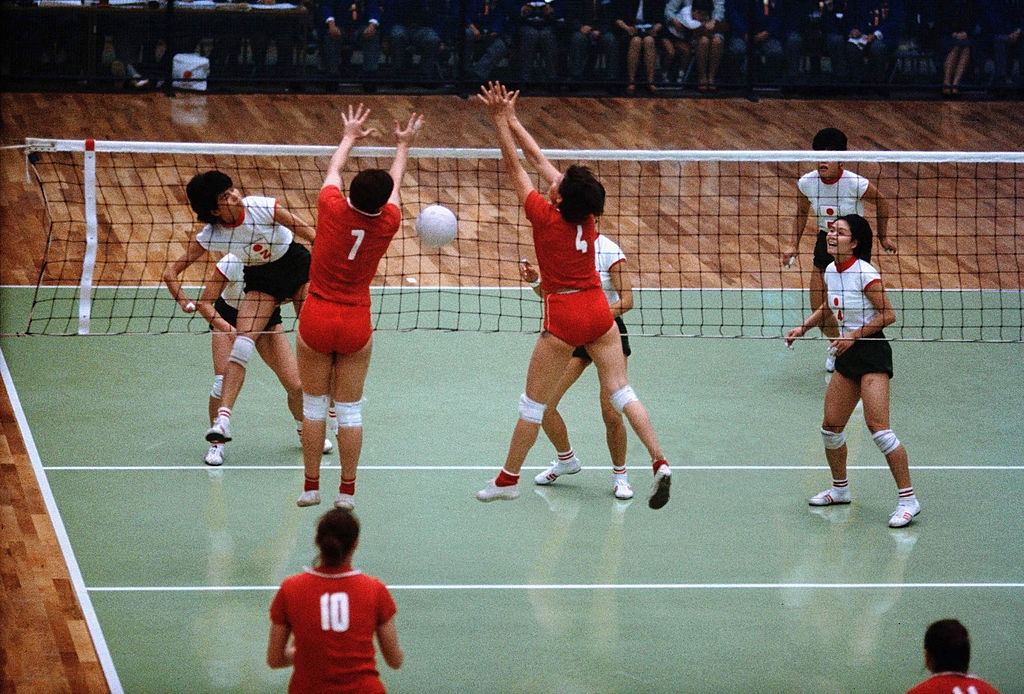
Japan's gold medal in women's volleyball at the 1964 Summer Olympics in Tokyo increased the popularity of sports manga among female readers.

Animal Olympic Games, a 1928 animated short film directed by Yasuji Murata, is regarded by critics as the first sports anime. The film was inspired by the 1928 Summer Olympics in Amsterdam and was indicative of a western influence on sports that would come to shape the genre, as in the subsequent short animated films Our Baseball Game (1930) also directed by Murata and Baseball in the Forest (1934) directed by Siichi Harada.

Though western sports have been played in Japan since the Meiji era, American forces during the occupation of Japan took an active role in encouraging the adoption of sports such as baseball, boxing, and wrestling. Traditional Japanese sports such as judo, karate, and kendo were banned from Japanese school curriculums as part of a broader effort to suppress activities that were seen as promoting belligerence or aggression. The ban was lifted in 1950 by General Douglas MacArthur, leading to a boom in popularity for both sports in general and sports manga.

The judo manga series Igaguri-kun by Eiichi Fukui, first published in the manga magazine Bōken'ō in 1952, is noted by Frederik L. Schodt as the first sports manga series. Baseball became the most popular sport in the genre through titles such as Dokaben and Star of the Giants, the former of which has sold over 48 million copies. Real-life sporting events that could be filmed by a single unmoving camera (such as pro wrestling or sumo) became popular televised sports, which discouraged anime and manga creators from attempting to adapt them; Jonathan Clements and Helen McCarthy note that creators realized the genre's "true potential lay in showing audiences [...] things they would not get so easily from live action".

The 1964 Summer Olympics in Tokyo prompted a boom in the popularity of sports manga and anime. Japan's gold medal in women's volleyball at these games saw an increase in the popularity of women's sports in Japan, and a corresponding increase in the popularity of sports manga in the shōjo (girls' manga) and josei (women's manga) demographics. The popularity of shōjo sports manga series such as Attack No. 1 – the first sports anime for a female audience – are credited with introducing a greater diversity of sports into the genre, including ballet and tennis. The 1960s also saw the melodrama of spo-kon stories decline in favor of comedic stories and four-panel comics, as well as the first anime adaptation of a sports manga with Star of the Giants in 1968.

In the 1970s, merchandising became a major sales driver for anime, leading to a proliferation of series such as Speed Racer that had potential as toys; baseball would also re-emerge as a popular subject for the genre. The 1980s saw a decline in the popularity of sports manga, as sci-fi and fantasy emerged as the medium's dominant genres. The majority of sports manga released during the 1980s were one-shots or only broadly gestured at sports; manga series such as Mitsuru Adachi's Touch, first published in 1981, foregrounded romance and a suburban setting that reflected Japan's growing middle class. Conversely, some 1980s sports manga such as Captain Tsubasa gained popularity on the basis of foreign sales potential; the series has been translated for international audiences in Spanish, Portuguese, French, and Italian.

The 1990s saw the genre expand into esoteric sports such as fishing and boat racing, while the 2000s saw increasing popularity of sports manga with fantasy elements (Eyeshield 21) or that focus on sedentary activities such as go or gin rummy. Spo-kon stories with stylized action and scrappy protagonists enjoyed a resurgence of popularity in the 2010s, as typified by series such as Ping Pong the Animation and Kuroko's Basketball. Sports manga has remained popular into the 2020s, even as romantic comedy, isekai, and battle manga have ascended to become the dominant genres of shōnen manga. Moe Tsuchiya, editor-in-chief of the sports manga magazine Comic Bull, hypothesized that this shift can be attributed to changing readership tastes, citing the generally slower pace of sports manga relative to these other genres.

== Impact ==
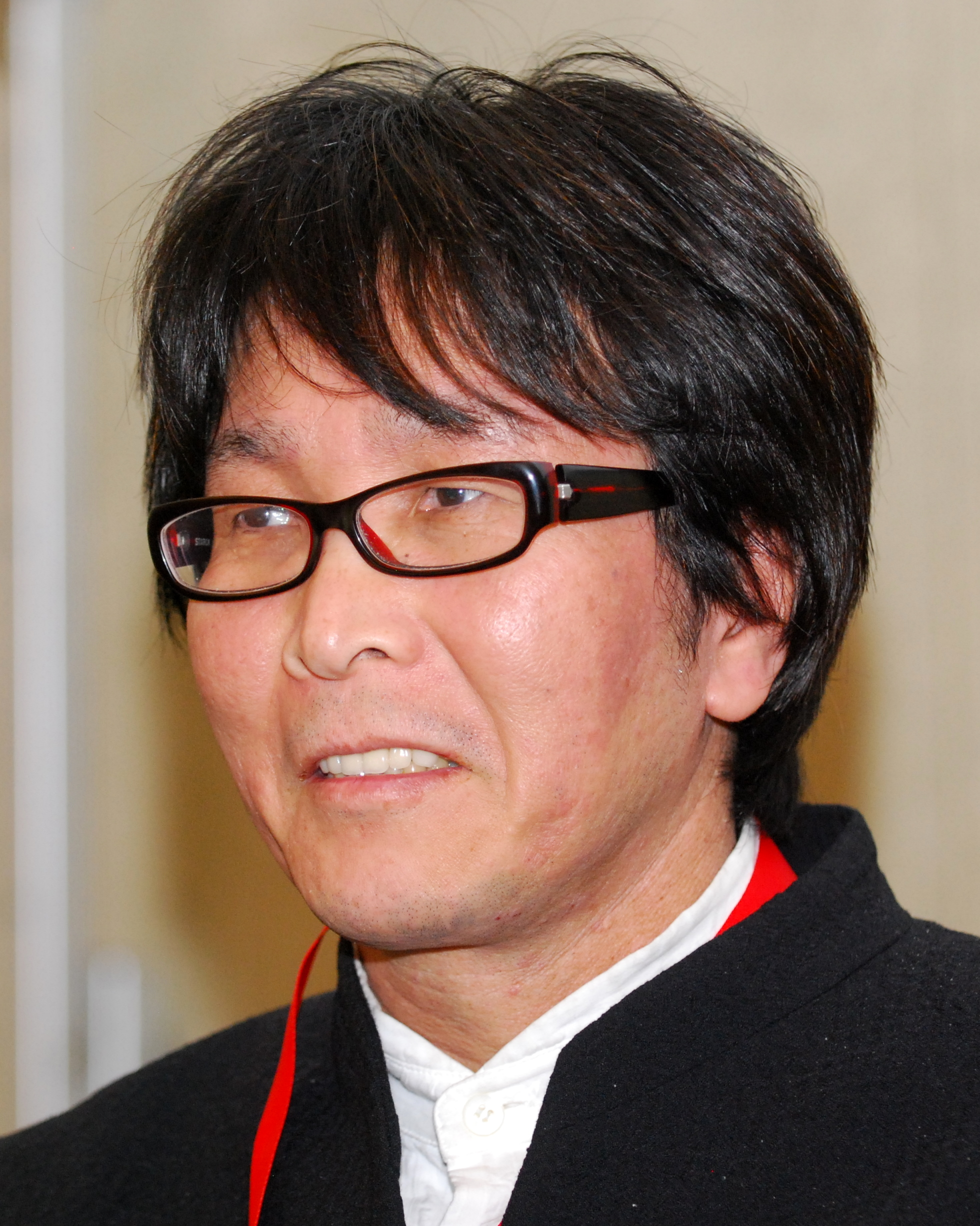
Yōichi Takahashi, whose 1981 association football series Captain Tsubasa is credited with popularizing the sport in Japan

Sports manga is among the most popular genres of manga and anime. It has been noted as "a vital part of the medium since its earliest days" and helped pioneer manga narratives where protagonists "struggle to succeed", a common trope in contemporary shōnen manga. Patrick Drazen notes in Anime Explosion! that sports manga is the best example of a manga genre where heroes "strive for perfection" in an attempt to "do one's best".

Outside of the small specialty golf manga magazines Golf Comic and Golf Comic Athlete, there are no manga magazines dedicated exclusively to sports manga, as the genre is ubiquitous in mainstream publications. In 2010, sports manga composed 33.3% of manga series in Weekly Shōnen Magazine, and 10.5% of manga series in Weekly Shōnen Jump.

Sports manga is credited with introducing new sports to Japan, and popularizing existing sports. Association football became popular in Japan through Captain Tsubasa, with members of the Japan national football team at the 2002 FIFA World Cup citing the series as among their influences. In 2017, NHK broadcast Bokura wa Manga de Tsuyokunatta (We Became Strong Through Manga), a documentary series about athletes who overcame hardships after being inspired by sports manga. The Olympic Museum scheduled (Note: As a result of the COVID-19 pandemic, museums in Switzerland were closed in April 2020 under the Epidemics Act.) an exhibition on sports manga for 2020 in advance of the 2020 Summer Olympics in Tokyo, calling the genre "a perfect tool to understand the evolution of sport in post-War Japan".

Titles in the sports genre are frequently influenced by major sporting events, or are timed to release concurrently with major sporting events. Notable examples include Attack on Tomorrow, which launched in 1977 to capitalize on Japan's victory in the 1977 FIVB Volleyball Women's World Cup; the anime film adaptation of Yawara!, which was timed to release with the 1996 Summer Olympics; and the anime remake of Attacker You!, which was timed to release with the 2008 Summer Olympics.

== See also ==
- List of sports anime and manga
