= Code-E =

Japanese anime television series

- Cover art for the first Code-E DVD
- Manga

Code-Ex
- Written by: Ichirō Sakaki
- Illustrated by: Yumiko Harao
- Published by: Shogakukan
- Magazine: Monthly Sunday Gene-X
- Original run: June 19, 2007 – June 19, 2008
- Volumes: 2
- Anime television series
- Directed by: Toshiyuki Katō
- Written by: Takuya Satō
- Studio: Studio Deen
- Licensed by: NA: Media Blasters
- Original network: ABC
- Original run: July 3, 2007 – September 18, 2007
- Episodes: 12
- Anime television series

Mission-E
- Directed by: Toshiyuki Katō
- Written by: Ichirō Sakaki
- Studio: Studio Deen
- Licensed by: NA: Media Blasters
- Original network: TVS
- Original run: July 7, 2008 – September 22, 2008
- Episodes: 12
- Light novel

Code-E: Harukanaru Sasayaki
- Written by: Ichirō Sakaki
- Illustrated by: Kōji Ogata
- Published by: Shogakukan
- Imprint: Gagaga Bunko
- Published: July 18, 2008
- icon

Code-E is a Japanese anime television series animated by Studio Deen. It is based on an original concept by Ichirō Sakaki and directed by Toshiyuki Katō. The first season consists of twelve episodes and first aired in Japan from July to September 2007. A second season titled Mission-E aired between July and September 2008.

== Plot ==
Chinami Ebihara is a high school student who emits electromagnetic waves when her emotions run wild. The waves affect electronics such as cell phones, televisions, and computers. Her ability forces her family to move from one location to another. In the year 2017, the Ebihara family moves yet again. At school, a boy named Kotaro Kannagi notices her ability and asks if he can study her. Kotaro's interest in Chinami is met with jealousy and misunderstanding by Kotaro's childhood friend, Kujo Sonomi.

== Characters ==
Chinami Ebihara (海老原 千波美, Ebihara Chinami)
Voiced by: Mai Hashimoto
Chinami Ebihara is a clumsy 17-year-old girl, who likes to read and do gardening. She has a mysterious ability to emit electromagnetic waves from her body when her emotions run high. This ability forces her to be unable to use electronic equipment of any kind. When the story begins, she had recently moved into town, and catches the attention of Kotaro Kannagi, an eccentric genius in her class. As the story progresses, she develops feelings for Kotaro and eventually ends up dating him.
In the sequel Mission-E, Chinami Ebihara has much better control over her abilities, and now works for the organization called OZ; her mission to help save other Type-E users from the Foundation and teach them how to use their abilities. She is equipped with a suit of armor (dubbed as the "Refray Dress") that utilizes her Type-E as a power source to fight off Foundation members. She and Kotaro are still dating and contact each other frequently through handwritten mail (as she always gets too emotional reading his messages she usually destroys electronic equipment) and gets very emotional when she sees him after a long time apart (where in episode 9 she blew up the helicopter room of OZ when he hugged her). In episode 4 she has seemed to have kept her dense trait, as it took Maori three times to suggest that Kotaro and Chinami would want some "private time" together after being away from each other for so long; where it didn't sink into Chinami until a few seconds after Maori left. In episode 10, Kotaro proposes to her and she accepts. After she discovers that there was a GPS in the ring, she is actually happy; stating that its like saying "he is always with her".
Kotaro Kannagi (巫 光太郎, Kannagi Kotaro)
Voiced by: Katsuhito Nomura
Kotaro is an absent minded genius in Chinami Ebihara's class. He is the head and only member in the Science Research club, and can always be found in the club room. At first he notices Chinami Ebihara's abilities and pressures her to allow him to study them. Eventually through a series of comic misunderstandings he comes to realize that he has feelings for Chinami Ebihara.
In the sequel Mission-E he and Ebihara are still dating; contacting each other through hand-written mail. He works for Oz as a scientist in a research center near a farm in Hokkaidō and developed the Refray Dress. He has stated even though it was because of her ability that he became interested in Ebihara, he loves her for her and not the TYPE-E. In episode 10 he gives her a ring and proposes to Ebihara, which she accepts. Later it is discovered that he planted a GPS in her ring, leading Kujo to hit him with her shoe for doing such a thing.
Sonomi Kujo (九条 園美, Kujo Sonomi)
Voiced by: Kaori Nazuka
Sonomi Kujo is Kotaro's childhood friend who is in love with him. She is very jealous of how Kotaro worries about Chinami and often misunderstands the situation. She is also very wealthy and sometimes can be found helping Kotaro with Chinami.
In the sequel Mission-E, she appears to have taken her father's place in running the company is married and has children. She also uses the company to create the organization called Oz to find other Type-E users, train them to use their abilities and protect them from the other organization called, The Foundation. She admits to Maori that she once had a crush on Kotaro back in their school days, but is happy that he and Chinami found each other. She gets really annoyed when Ebihara calls her by her name instead of the Director, something Ebihara does quite often. She is the one who told Kotaro to check up on Chinami at episode 12 and already knew Kotaro harbors feelings for Chinami.
Keiko Komatsuna (小松菜 圭子, Komatsuna Keiko)
Voiced by: Halko Momoi
Keiko Komatsuna sits in the seat in front of Chinami during class. She is Chinami's first friend after she transferred to the new school.
In Mission-E she works as a school nurse for Maori Kimizuka's school. She is well like with her students and likes to tease them as well. It is hinted that she knows about OZ with her extra attention towards Maori's well-being but nothing has been confirmed yet.
Yuma Saihashi (斎橋 由真, Saihashi Yuma)
Voiced by: Risa Mizuno
Yuma Saihashi is a Miko who lives at the shrine. She is a lone wolf who distances herself from others and refrains from making friends. During her free time, she gives massages to the elders in the neighborhood but refuses their gifts. Like Chinami, she can emit electromagnetic waves. Her power is not as strong as Chinami's but she can control it better. Yuma looks out for Chinami and warns her of potential danger.
So far in the sequel of Mission-E, she is a member of Oz and now wears glasses. To what position she is in has yet been revealed but she appears to be a jack of all trades: from giving Chinami and Maori their mission statements, is capable of flying a helicopter and driving a boat. She also has her own Refray dress which is green and morphs the metal wire into a bow and arrow.
Keisuke Ebihara (海老原 啓介, Ebihara Keisuke)
Voiced by: Kōzō Shioya
Keisuke Ebinhara is Chinami's father and works at home as a writer. He is often worried about Chinami, especially when it comes to boys.
He makes an appearance in episode 5 of the sequel and knows all about Oz. However he seems to have become lazy towards his writing, asking his daughter if she would like to go someplace to eat when he was already past his deadline.
Mitsuki Ebihara (海老原 美月, Ebihara Mitsuki)
Voiced by: Akiko Hiramatsu
Mitsuki Ebihara is Chinami's mother. She's a business woman. She has yet to make an appearance in the sequel.
Adol Brinberg (アドル·ブリンベルケ, Adoru Burinbaagu)
Voiced by: Hiroshi Kamiya
Adol Brinberg is a German spy and twin brother of Mils.
In Mission-E he seems to hold a grudge against Chinami for what happened at the summer school some years ago. His hair has become much darker and now views all TYPE-E users as his enemy because of what Chinami did to his sister. Even though he hates Type-E, he appears to be growing feelings for Maori.
Mils Brinberg (ミリス·ブリンベルケ, Missu Burinbaagu)
Voiced by: Megumi Toyoguchi
Mils Brinberg is a German spy and twin sister of Adol.
In Mission-E she seems to have become really ill or went into a coma after the summer school incident. Because of this Adol is no longer his cheerful self. Describing her to be alive "just alive". However, after a visit from Maori, she has shown to react but to what extent was never revealed.
Maori Kimizuka (君塚 麻織, Kimizuka Maori)
Voiced by: Yūna Inamura
First appears in episode 5 of Code-E as a little girl out with her golden retriever puppy Dorota and then later in the sequel Mission-E as the new main character working alongside Chinami in Oz as well as being a high school student. She comes off as a cold girl, this being when she was a child she would accidentally erase her information, causing the other students and even her friends to avoid her (calling her a ghost). Her power suit uses a type of metal wire that she can utilize her powers through to create a variety of different offensive, defensive, or any other type of useful item as well as a pair of tonfas. It is hinted that she is jealous of Chinami as she was able to find a boyfriend who loves her even though she has Type-E. Often referred to as Ma-chan and has a pet Golden Retriever named Dorota. She now appears to have a crush on Adol and after hearing from Kotaro that Type-E powers could be used to help cure illnesses, she is pondering if her abilities could save Adol's sister.

== Media ==
=== Anime ===
==== List of Code-E episodes ====
No.	Title	Original release date
1	"The Circumstances of Confessing to a Transfer Student."; Transliteration: "Tenkōsei to Kokuhaku no koto." (Japanese: 転校生と告白のこと.)	July 3, 2007
Chinami Ebihara transfers to a new school. While getting a tour of the school, a student named Kotaro notices her ability. After school, Kotaro asks her if she would go out with him.
2	"The Circumstances of Science and Happiness."; Transliteration: "Kagaku to Shiawase no koto." (Japanese: 科学と幸せのこと.)	July 10, 2007
The school is shut down so Chinami takes a tour of the town. She meets Kotaro working at his family business and runs away. Kotaro once again asks Chinami if she would go out with him for the sake of science and she finally agrees.
3	"The Circumstances of Electromagnetic Waves and Research."; Transliteration: "Denjiha to Kenkyū no koto." (Japanese: 電磁波と研究のこと.)	July 17, 2007
Kotaro begins his tests on Chinami. Sonomi notices them together and begins to get jealous.
4	"The Circumstances of Secrets and the Idiot."; Transliteration: "Himitsu to Baka no koto." (Japanese: 秘密とバカのこと.)	July 24, 2007
Sonomi privately asks Chinami to meet her on the roof. While being interrogated, Chinami loses control over her emotions and emits electromagnetic waves. After Chinami calms down, Sonomi begins to understand the situation.
5	"About Depression, Parents and their Children."; Transliteration: "Yūutsu to Oyako no koto." (Japanese: 憂鬱と親子のこと.)	July 31, 2007
Chinami accidentally erases her father's novel that he is supposed to write. Sonomi and Kotaro notices that Chinami is depressed and try to cheer her up.
6	"About Shrine Maidens and Training."; Transliteration: "Miko-san to Shugyō no koto." (Japanese: 巫女さんと修行のこと.)	August 7, 2007
Yuma invites Chinami over to her temple to warn her and train her to control her emotions.
7	"About Foreigners and First Loves."; Transliteration: "Gaikokujin to Hatsukoi no koto." (Japanese: 外国人と初恋のこと.)	August 14, 2007
The two twin foreigners come to the school in disguise as exchange students. While several other students fall for them, Chinami starts to realize feelings of her own for Kotaro.
8	"About Venus Flytraps and Chance Encounters."; Transliteration: "Irojikake to Surechigai no koto." (Japanese: 色仕掛けとすれ違いのこと.)	August 21, 2007
Sonomi and Kotaro discover the source of Chinami's ability thanks to Sonomi's hard work. Adol decides to change his tactics of spying by attempting to steal Chinami's heart. Adol confesses his love to Chinami but at the same time Mils confesses to Kotaro.
9	"About Marriage Interviews and Rivals in Love."; Transliteration: "O Miai to Koigataki no koto." (Japanese: お見合いと恋敵のこと.)	August 28, 2007
Chinami overhears Kotaro telling Sonomi that he is only interested in Chinami's ability and nothing more. She causes huge electrical breakdown throughout the city and the twins discover she is more powerful than what they originally thought. While not far away a new face appears to be spying on her.
10	"About Missing Ability and Moods."; Transliteration: "Kieta Chikara to Kimochi no koto." (Japanese: 消えた力と気持ちのこと.)	September 4, 2007
Chinami loses her ability to emit EM rays. She is happy that she is able to buy a cell phone and walk in an electronic store without problems but she is sad about changing the ways she used to do things when she didn't have to rely on electronic devices.
11	"About Summer School and Conspiracy."; Transliteration: "Samā Sukūru to Inbō no koto." (Japanese: サマースクールと陰謀のこと.)	September 11, 2007
Everyone goes on a summer school trip to a high tech town with the latest equipment. The man who was spying on Chinami before is behind the scenes spying on Chinami to gauge her ability. After a day of free time, Chinami discovers that her ability is slowly returning, but she refuses to tell Kotaro about it.
12	"About Ruin and Restoration."; Transliteration: "Hametsu to Saisei no koto." (Japanese: 破滅と再生のこと.)	September 18, 2007
Chinami is having trouble using the town's equipment because of her returning power and Yuma discovers her power is growing and has trouble controlling it. They decide to skip the barbecue and stay in their rooms because they are worried of the trouble they would cause if they went. Sonomi lets Kotaro go to Chinami and he confesses his love for her. Chinami causes another electrical breakdown that destroys all of the town's equipment and causes the building they were in to collapse.

==== List of Mission-E episodes ====
No.	Title	Original release date
1	"In the World's Abduction"; Transliteration: "Sekai no Abudakushon de" (Japanese: 世界のアブダクションで)	July 7, 2008
2	"Girls Infiltrate Daisakusen"; Transliteration: "On'nanoko wa Sakusen ni Sen'nyū" (Japanese: 女の子は作戦に潜入)	July 14, 2008
3	"Twilight Operation!"; Transliteration: "Towairaito Sōsa!" (Japanese: トワイライト操作！)	July 21, 2008
4	"Operation in the Lands of the North!"; Transliteration: "Kita no Tochi de no Dōsa!" (Japanese: 北の土地での動作！)	July 28, 2008
5	"Operation GOGO WEST! (Part 1)"; Transliteration: "Sōsa GOGO WESR! (Part 1)" (Japanese: 操作GOGO WEST！ (Part 1))	August 4, 2008
6	"Operation GOGO WEST! (Part 2)"; Transliteration: "Sōsa GOGO WEST! (Part 2)" (Japanese: 操作GOGO WEST！ (Part 2))	August 11, 2008
7	"Operation Alright I Wonder?"; Transliteration: "Sōsa wa, Watashi wa Wandā ī ka?" (Japanese: 操作は、私はワンダーいいか？)	August 18, 2008
8	"A Little Awful, Operation Date!"; Transliteration: "Ritoru Hidoi, Unten-Bi!" (Japanese: リトルひどい、運転日！)	August 25, 2008
9	"Operation Combination Restart!"; Transliteration: "Sōsa no Kumiawase wa, Sakidō Shimasu!" (Japanese: 操作の組み合わせは、再起動します！)	September 1, 2008
10	"Operation Past Karma!"; Transliteration: "Sōsa Kako no Karuma!" (Japanese: 操作過去のカルマ！)	September 8, 2008
11	"Operation Christmas Night!"; Transliteration: "Opurēshon·Kurisumasu·Naito!" (Japanese: オペレーション·クリスマス·ナイト！)	September 15, 2008
12	"The Last of the Last of All Operations!"; Transliteration: "Subete no Sōsa no Saigo no Saigo!" (Japanese: すべての操作の最後の最後！)	September 22, 2008

=== Manga ===
A manga series, titled Code-Ex, illustrated by Yumiko Harao, was serialized in Shogakukan's seinen manga magazine Monthly Sunday Gene-X from June 19, 2007, to June 19, 2008. (Note: It was serialized until the July 2008 issue of the magazine, and released on June 19, 2008.) Shogakukan collected its chapters in two tankōbon volumes, released on February 28 and July 28, 2008.

=== Music ===
Code-E
Opening theme: "E☆Scandal" (E☆スキャンダル)
Composition and arrangement by: Caoli Cano
Ending theme: "Kimi Kara no Kiseki" (きみからの奇跡)
Vocals by: Maori Kimizuka (Yūna Inamura). Lyrics, composition and arrangement by Caoli Cano
Mission-E
Opening theme: E☆Secrets" (E☆シークレッツ) by ZOOM FLICKER
Ending theme: "Feel so Easy! ビリビリver." by Momoi, Haruko (Eps. 3, 4, 5, 8, 10)
Ending theme: "Kimi kara no Kiseki" (きみからの奇跡) by Inamura, Yuna (Ep. 12)
