= Shion no Ō =

Japanese manga series

- First tankōbon volume cover, featuring Shion Yasuoka

しおんの王
- Genre: Mystery; Sports (shogi)
- Manga
- Written by: Masaru Katori
- Illustrated by: Jiro Ando
- Published by: Kodansha
- Imprint: Afternoon KC
- Magazine: Monthly Afternoon
- Original run: March 25, 2004 – April 25, 2008
- Volumes: 8
- Anime television series
- Directed by: Toshifumi Kawase
- Written by: Takashi Yamada
- Music by: Kosuke Yamashita
- Studio: Studio Deen
- Original network: Fuji TV
- Original run: October 14, 2007 – March 23, 2008
- Episodes: 22
- Video game
- Publisher: Mainichi Communications
- Genre: Adventure, shogi
- Platform: Nintendo DS
- Released: April 10, 2008
- icon

Shion no Ō (Japanese: しおんの王; lit. 'Shion's King'), subtitled The Flowers of Hard Blood, is a Japanese manga series written by Masaru Katori and illustrated by Jiro Ando. It was serialized in Kodansha's seinen manga magazine Monthly Afternoon from March 2004 to April 2008, with its chapters collected in eight tankōbon volumes. It has been adapted as a twenty-two episode anime television series by Studio Deen, which aired in Japan between October 2007 and March 2008. A video game for the Nintendo DS was released on April 10, 2008, by Mainichi Communications.

== Plot ==
Shion no Ō centers around a young junior-high school girl named Shion Yasuoka who had witnessed the murder of her parents as a small child. At the time of the murder, the killer takes the king piece from her father's shogi board (a Japanese strategy board game similar to chess). This leads her to believe that the murderer may be a shogi player. The shock of the tragic incident renders Shion unable to speak, forcing her to communicate by writing on a note pad. After being adopted by her neighbors, the Yasuoka family (where the husband is also a shogi player), Shion takes up the game herself, both for the love of the game and to possibly learn of the person who had killed her parents.

== Characters ==
Shion Yasuoka (安岡 紫音, Yasuoka Shion)
Voiced by: Ayako Kawasumi
Shion Yasuoka, formerly Shion Ishiwatari (石渡 紫音, Ishiwatari Shion) before adoption, is the main protagonist of the story. When she was five years old, Shion's parents were slaughtered in their own home, though the murderer was never found. Shion, being a young girl at the time, was traumatized by bearing witness to the aftermath and since then has been mute. To communicate, she writes down everything on a notepad. At the murder scene, Shion found a king shogi piece and later comes to suspect that the culprit plays the game.
When the story begins, Shion is thirteen and is in junior-high school. She loves sweets, though chocolate is her favorite. Due to her foster father's influence, Shion eventually starts to play shogi which she hopes will give her clues about the murder of her parents. Throughout the series, she only talks through internal monologue until the final episode where she regains her voice and is able to speak.
Makoto Hani (羽仁 真, Hani Makoto)
Voiced by: Hozumi Gōda
Makoto is a professional shogi player and is referred to by many as Meijin (名人), the highest and most prestigious professional shogi rank in Japan (similar to a World Chess Champion). A keen and perceptive man who abandoned his brother after their mother's death to become a professional player himself. It is revealed near the end of the series that he is the one that killed Shion's parents, because he was interested in seeing what kind of professional Shogi player Shion would become, but this caused conflict with her father, who did not want his daughter to play professional Shogi. He was defeated in a match by Shion and arrested immediately afterwards, but not before remarking that Shion had the "eyes of a pro".
Satoru Hani (羽仁 悟, Hani Satoru)
Voiced by: Masaya Matsukaze
Satoru is Makoto's younger brother and works as a businessman. Aside from that, he is also a gifted shogi player himself, who dreams to one day defeat his brother in an official match. His girlfriend was working with Shion's dead parents, and mysteriously died one day after them.
Ayumi Saitō (斉藤 歩, Saitō Ayumi)
Voiced by: Romi Park
Ayumi is a fifteen-year-old male shogi player. Due to his sickly mother, he had to leave high school to take care of her and pay for her hospital bills. When playing shogi, he pretends to be a girl in order to earn money for competing; due to the male league taking two years to qualify. In the anime, after episode sixteen, he plays as a boy. Progressively through the series, he seems to care very much about Shion, saying that he wants to protect her. Many people often tease him about being Shion's boyfriend, causing him to become embarrassed. When he plays against Satoru, Meijin's younger brother, he reveals that his father was once a shogi player.
Saori Nikaidō (二階堂 沙織, Nikaidō Saori)
Voiced by: Risa Mizuno
Saori is a female shogi player and apprentice to Makoto. She is eighteen years old, and a fan of Shion. As befitting the daughter of a high-class family, her type of shougi is usually dignified. She deeply seeks recognition from Makoto, who she looks up to.
Shinji Yasuoka (安岡 信次, Yasuoka Shinji)
Voiced by: Yasunori Matsumoto
Shinji is Shion's foster father and is a professional shogi player. His rank is 8 dan.
Sachiko Yasuoka (安岡 幸子, Yasuoka Sachiko)
Voiced by: Mariko Kouda
Sachiko is Shion's foster mother. A strict but caring woman who ever supports her daughter and husband, despite not always agreeing with them.
Osamu Kamizono (神園 修, Kamizono Osamu)
Voiced by: Ryusei Nakao
A secluded 9-dan shogi player. Despite his grumpy exterior earning him the nickname "demon," Kamizono seems to have a kind spirit, as he not only accepted Ayumi as his apprentice, even after discovering his secret, but also lent some money to Shinji when he decided to adopt Shion. He's implied to place a great deal of value in family, refusing a disciple who abandoned his brother to learn from him but accepting one who would do anything to save his mother.
Tooru Hisatani (久谷 透, Hisatani Tooru)
Voiced by: Takahiro Matsukawa
Tooru is Shinji's apprentice.

== Media ==
=== Manga ===
Written by Masaru Katori and illustrated by Jiro Ando, Shion no Ō was serialized in Kodansha's seinen manga magazine Monthly Afternoon from March 25, 2004, (Note: Debuted in the magazine's May 2004 issue, released on March 25, 2004.) to April 25, 2008. (Note: Finished in the magazine's June 2008 issue, released on April 25, 2008.) Kodansha collected its chapters in eight tankōbon volumes, released from October 22, 2004, to May 23, 2008.

==== Volumes ====
No.	Release date	ISBN
1	October 22, 2004	978-4-06-314360-7
2	May 23, 2005	978-4-06-314378-2
3	January 23, 2006	978-4-06-314403-1
4	July 21, 2006	978-4-06-314418-5
5	May 23, 2007	978-4-06-314445-1
6	October 23, 2007	978-4-06-314472-7
7	January 23, 2008	978-4-06-314485-7
8	May 23, 2008	978-4-06-314505-2

=== Anime ===
In May 2007, Kodansha announced that the anime adaptation of Shion no Ō was in production. Produced by Studio Deen and directed by Toshifumi Kawase, its 22 episodes were broadcast in Japan on the Fuji TV television network from October 14, 2007, to March 23, 2008. (Note: Shion no Ō aired on Fuji TV on Saturday 26:15, effectively Sunday at 2:15 a.m. JST.) The opening theme is "Lady Love" by Rize and the ending theme is "My Dear Friend" by Thelma Aoyama.

==== Episodes ====
No.	Title	Original release date
1	"Shion's Path"; Transliteration: "Shion no Michi" (Japanese: しおんの道)	October 14, 2007
Eight years after witnessing her parents' death, Shion qualifies herself as a professional shogi player. However, her precocious career starts to draw unwanted attention.
2	"Secrets"; Transliteration: "Himitsu" (Japanese: 秘密)	October 21, 2007
Shion is saved in the nick of time from a dangerous stalker. However, her drama continues as she receives a threatening letter before an important match.
3	"The Sound of Shogi Pieces"; Transliteration: "Koma Oto" (Japanese: 駒音)	October 28, 2007
Shion reveals to her adopted parents that she vaguely remembers what happened to her real parents. Just as the police visit to ask her to identify a suspect, Shion ends up in the hospital due to shock, combined with stress from two threats, after seeing blood from her period. Shion wakes up five days later, and a little relief comes when the man who attacked her six months before is finally arrested. Despite only just waking, Shion sneaks out of the hospital to play in the semi-final match against Ayumi. She also recognizes Ayumi as the boy who saved her at that time.
4	"Demon Hand"; Transliteration: "Kishu" (Japanese: 鬼手)	November 4, 2007
Shion has another fiery match against Ayumi, while the police discovers that the man who killed her parents is drawing close to her.
5	"Courageous Move"; Transliteration: "Yūki no Itte" (Japanese: 勇気の一手)	November 11, 2007
Shion is hospitalized again after having a glimpse of the night when she lost her parents. Meanwhile, Nikaido and Ayumi have their first duel.
6	"Provocation"; Transliteration: "Chōhatsu" (Japanese: 挑発)	November 18, 2007
After Shion recovers, she goes on a trip with her family. Upon returning, she and Nikaido receive a sudden request from Hani-Meijin's younger brother, Satoru.
7	"Playing Pieces"; Transliteration: "Asobi Koma" (Japanese: 遊び駒)	November 25, 2007
Shion and Nikaido have their first match as a demonstration of their abilities to Satoru, who wants to create an all new, unrestricted shogi tournament.
8	"The Door to Dreams"; Transliteration: "Yume e no Tobira" (Japanese: 夢への扉)	December 2, 2007
Shion visits Ayumi's mother at the hospital, and later, she and Ayumi start to make plans for the upcoming tournament.
9	"Master & Apprentice"; Transliteration: "Shitei" (Japanese: 師弟)	December 9, 2007
Nikaido has a tough match in the tournament against Kamizono who also happens to be Ayumi's master. Kamizono however, is not at the best of his health.
10	"Good Luck Charm"; Transliteration: "Omajinai" (Japanese: おまじない)	December 16, 2007
Shion's next opponent is a young prodigy who polished his skills in online matches, and learns from an anonymous source a way to have an advantage over him.
11	"Doubt"; Transliteration: "Giwaku" (Japanese: 疑惑)	December 23, 2007
Shion received a threatening call from the murderer, and Hisatani gets himself in trouble when the police finds out that it was made from his cell phone.
12	"Fox's Prediction"; Transliteration: "Kitsune no Yomi" (Japanese: 狐の読み)	January 13, 2008
Shion, Ayumi and Nikaido prepare themselves as each one has a strong enemy to face in order to gain a place in the finals.
13	"Duality"; Transliteration: "Hyōriittai" (Japanese: 表裏一体)	January 20, 2008
During Shion's match with Satoru, she starts to get a glimpse of his hostility towards her.
14	"Timbre of a Challenge"; Transliteration: "Chōsen no Fu" (Japanese: 挑戦の譜)	January 27, 2008
Nikaido discovers Ayumi's secret, but decides to not expose him. Later the tournament's remaining contestants earn a place in the finals.
15	"Time's Answer"; Transliteration: "Toki no Kotae" (Japanese: 時の答え)	February 3, 2008
Shion's first opponent in the finals is none other than her foster father. During the long match, she eagerly looks for a way to defeat him, while he reminisces about the time when she became his apprentice.
16	"Watching From Heaven"; Transliteration: "Tengan" (Japanese: 天眼)	February 10, 2008
Ayumi is devastated with the death of his mother, and looks for a reason to keep playing shogi before his match with Satoru.
17	"Mind Reading"; Transliteration: "Dokushinjutsu" (Japanese: 読心)	February 17, 2008
Shion's got a chance to play against Satoru once more in the tournament's semi-finals, but during the match, he questions her about the night her parents were murdered, which brings up some memories she had long forgotten.
18	"Halted Time"; Transliteration: "Todomatta Jikan" (Japanese: 止まった時間)	February 24, 2008
Shion and Satoru's match continues, while Hani-Meijin introduces Ayumi as his disciple.
19	"Recalling Move"; Transliteration: "Yomigaeru Itte" (Japanese: 甦る一手)	March 2, 2008
Satoru and Ayumi exchange information and find out the culprit's identity but are still far from figuring out his motives. In the meantime, the police becomes even more suspicious of Satoru after what he said to Shion in their last match.
20	"Demon Killer"; Transliteration: "Onigoroshi" (Japanese: 鬼殺し)	March 9, 2008
The final match between Shion and Hani-Meijin begins. As the game progresses, her memories of the night of her parents' death become clearer.
21	"The True Criminal"; Transliteration: "Shinhannin" (Japanese: 真犯人)	March 16, 2008
The final match continues, and purposely goaded by Hani-Meijin, Shion fully remembers the incident and recognizes him as the criminal.
22	"Towards Tomorrow"; Transliteration: "Ashita e" (Japanese: 明日へ)	March 23, 2008
The police gathers solid evidence against Hani-Meijin for the deaths of Shion's parents and Satoru's girlfriend. As the officers appear to arrest him, his match with Shion draws to a close and she finally overcomes her tragic past, recovering her voice in the occasion.

=== Video game ===
An adventure video game based on the series was released by Mainichi Communications for the Nintendo DS on April 10, 2008.
