= Windy Tales =

Japanese anime television series

- Japanese volume one DVD cover art

風人物語 (Fūjin Monogatari)
- Genre: Slice of life, Supernatural
- Anime television series
- Directed by: Junji Nishimura
- Written by: Hiroaki Jinno; Junji Nishimura; Mako Hyoudou; Masatsugu Arakawa
- Music by: Kenji Kawai
- Studio: Production I.G
- Licensed by: NA: Sentai Filmworks
- Original network: SKY PerfecTV!, Family Gekijo, NHK2, Animax
- English network: Animax Asia, Anime Network
- Original run: September 11, 2004 – February 26, 2005
- Episodes: 13

Windy Tales (風人物語, Fūjin Monogatari) is a Japanese anime television series produced by Production I.G, about a group of people who can control the wind. The series premiered from September 11, 2004, to February 26, 2005, across Japan on the anime television network, Animax, which also later aired the series across its respective networks worldwide, including East Asia, Southeast Asia, and other regions. Sentai Filmworks licensed the series and released it with English subtitles in July 2015.

It is distinguished from other Production I.G series because of its draft-like animation style mixed with 3D elements.

== Characters ==
Nao Ueshima
Voiced by: Kaori Nazuka
Nao is the president of the two person Digital Camera Club, and the second student at the school to discover the wind users. She discovers the Wind Cat on the school roof and while taking its picture it flies away into the sky with a swarm of other cats. Nao falls off the roof but lands safely and proceeds to search out the cause. She discovers Ryouko and the Wind Cat and sets out to discover the secrets of the Wind users.
Ryouko Yoshino
Voiced by: Ai Iwamura
Ryouko was the first student to discover the wind users, and has a crush on Taiki. Taiki taught her how to use the wind and she claims that he also taught the Wind Cat, who may have taught the other cats.
Mr. Taiki
Voiced by: Ōki Sugiyama
A math teacher at the school and a Wind user from the Wind village. He is at first reluctant to teach the children how to manipulate the wind, but after they learn from other sources he provides insight and help on occasion.
Miki Kataoka
Voiced by: Satomi Hamamura
Miki is the only other member of the digital camera club. She is Nao's friend, and aids her in her photography but doesn't seem interested in photography herself. Along with Jun and Nao she learns of the wind users and learns the secrets of wind manipulation. She has had a crush on Jun for a while, and they eventually end up dating.
Jun Nomura
Voiced by: Miyu Irino
After mistakenly telling everyone that he saw Nao try to kill herself he apologizes profusely and ends up following her and Miki around to make it up to her. He also learns about wind manipulation and joins Miki and Nao in learning about the wind and sharing in their explorations.
Yukio
Voiced by: Risa Mizuno
Yukio is a woman that lives in the village of wind users. She is the widow of Taiki's brother and has an ambiguous relationship with him.
The Wind Cat
A cat that Taiki taught how to manipulate the wind. He likes to sleep on the school roof, and play in the winds. Ryouko feeds him and looks out for him.

== Music ==
- Opening Theme: Kaze no Shi ~windy Tales~, performed by CHARA
- Ending Theme: Yuuhi no Iro Dake, performed by Windy-S
- Background Music: Kawai Kenji

== Episode list ==
No.	Title	Original release date
1	"Wind Cat" "Kaze Neko" (風猫)	September 11, 2004
Nao Ueshima, president of the school's Digital Photography club, witnesses an amazing phenomenon up on the school roof, a cat with the ability to control the wind. Her discovery and curiosity soon leads her to learn of a wind village.
2	"Festival of Winds" "Kaze no Matsuri" (風の祭り)	September 11, 2004
Nao, Miki and Jun arrive at the wind village but their teacher, Mr. Taiki refuses to teach them the secret to wind control. They meet an old man however who offers to teach them, but the lesson was not easy especially for Nao.
3	"Running Girl" "RANNINGU GĀRU" (ランニング·ガール)	October 9, 2004
The digital camera club is assigned by the school to take pictures of Atsuko, the school's only marathon runner.
4	"Acorn the Flying Squirrel" "Donguri wa Musasabi" (どんぐりはムササビ)	October 9, 2004
Jun rescues a Japanese giant flying squirrel and tries to teach it to fly.
5	"School Infirmary Story" "Hokenshitsu Monogatari" (保健室物語)	November 13, 2004
Nao is sick with the flu and is brought into the infirmary. There she is entertained with stories from Mr. Makino.
6	"Kick the Can" "Kankeri" (缶けり)	November 13, 2004
Nao and Ryouko befriend a group of 5th graders when they join them in a game of 'Kick the Can'.
7	"The Typhoon Came" "Taifuu ga Kita" (台風が来た)	December 11, 2004
The digital camera club is in school on a Sunday preparing for an exhibition. A typhoon approaches but the wind cat is nowhere to be found. They go looking for it.
8	"Big Cleaning - Premonition of a Kiss" "Oosouji wa Chuu no Yokan" (大掃除はチュウの予感)	December 11, 2004
During a big clean up of the digital camera club room, Nao, Miki and Jun find an old photo album left by a member of the former photography club. They decide to search for its owner and return it to her. The identity of one of the people on the photographs surprises them.
9	"Father's Motorcycle" "Chichi no ŌTOBAI" (父のオートバイ)	January 22, 2005
Nao's father is going through midlife crisis and starts riding a motorcycle and taking her out for rides. One day he has an accident and breaks his leg.
10	"The Earth's Last Day" "Chikyuu Saigo no Hi" (地球最後の日)	January 22, 2005
As winter break starts the girls go out and watch a movie together. All of them have started having weird dreams that they believe may be a message from the wind.
11	"Audition - The Factual Record" "ŌDISHON Tenmatsuki" (オーディション顛末記)	February 26, 2005
The girls in class all apply for "The 21st Century Idol Audition." When Nao is selected for the second round of auditions she has mixed feelings. At the second screening, she meets her classmate Karin. In contrast to Nao, who is very nervous, Karin already belongs to a talent agency and has a lot of experience in auditioning.
12	"Cherry Blossom Time" "Sakura no Koro" (桜のころ)	February 26, 2005
Nao and Miki hear an old woman at a rice cake shop near their school tell an old story of a cherry blossom tree in front of the next train station when she was young. After years, the tree is surrounded by dumped garbage. They wish to do something for the woman.
13	"Yukio, Once Again" "Yukio, Futatabi" (雪緒, 再び)	February 26, 2005
The girls start to lose control of the wind. This seems to be connected with the arrival of Yukio, Taiki's sister-in-law, to the town.
