= Jiro Ando =

Japanese manga artist

Jiro Ando (安藤 慈朗, Andō Jirō) is a Japanese manga artist notable as being the artist of the manga Shion no Ō.

He also created the manga version of Bushido Sixteen.
