= Bushido Sixteen =

2007 novel by Tetsuya Honda

武士道シックスティーン (Bushidō Shikkusutiin)
- Novel
- Written by: Tetsuya Honda
- Published by: Bungeishunjū
- Published: 25 July 2007
- Live-action film
- Directed by: Tomoyuki Furumaya
- Produced by: Mamoru Inoue; Shinsuke Higuchi
- Written by: Toshiya Ohno; Tomoyuki Furumaya
- Music by: Tadashi Ueda
- Licensed by: Go! Cinema
- Released: 24 April 2010
- Runtime: 109 minutes
Further information
Manga
Written by	Tetsuya Honda
Illustrated by	Jiro Ando
Published by	Kodansha
Imprint	Afternoon KC
Magazine	Monthly Afternoon
Original run	25 May 2009 – 25 October 2010
Volumes	3
Manga
Written by	Tetsuya Honda
Illustrated by	Akira Ozaki
Published by	Shueisha
Imprint	Margaret Comics
Magazine	The Margaret
Original run	28 May 2009 – 28 May 2010
Volumes	4

Bushido Sixteen (Japanese: 武士道シックスティーン, Hepburn: Bushidō Shikkusutiin) is a 2007 novel by Tetsuya Honda. It was adapted into a film directed by Tomoyuki Furumaya in 2010. Jiro Ando created the manga adaptation for the film in Kodansha's Monthly Afternoon magazine.

== Characters ==
Kaori Isoyama (磯山 香織, Isoyama Kaori)
Portrayed by: Riko Narumi
Sanae Nishogi (西荻 早苗, Nishogi Sanae)
Portrayed by: Kie Kitano
Kazuharu Isoyama (磯山 和晴, Isoyama Kazuharu)
Portrayed by: Hideo Ishiguro
Satsuki Tamura (田村 咲月, Tamura Satsuki)
Portrayed by: Moe Arai
Kozue Hisano (久野 こずえ, Hisano Kozue)
Portrayed by: Rio Yamashita
Yukari Murahama (村浜 ゆかり, Murahama Yukari)
Portrayed by: Koto Takagi
Takumi Oka (岡 巧, Oka Takumi)
Portrayed by: Kento Kaku
Midoriko Nishiogi (西荻 綠子, Nishiogi Midoriko)
Portrayed by: Haru
Keiko Nishiogi (西荻 景子, Nishiogi Keiko)
Portrayed by: Hiro Komura
Ryuzo Koshiba (小柴 隆造, Koshiba Ryuzo)
Portrayed by: Keisuke Horibe
Kensuke Isoyama (磯山 憲介, Isoyama Kensuke)
Portrayed by: Shigemitsu Ogi
Hajime Kōmoto (甲本 肇, Kōmoto Hajime)
Portrayed by: Itsuji Itao
