= Luck & Logic =

Japanese media franchise

- Cover of the first Blu-ray volume

ラクエンロジック (Raku en Rojikku)
- Genre: Action, fantasy, science fiction
- Created by: Septpia
- Anime television series
- Directed by: Koichi Chigira; Takashi Naoya
- Produced by: Kengo Abe; Kôichi Kudô; Maaya Komatsu; Terushige Yoshie; Yuki Muramatsu
- Written by: Yuuya Takahashi
- Music by: Tatsuya Kato
- Studio: Doga Kobo
- Licensed by: Crunchyroll; AUS: Madman Entertainment; SEA: Muse Communication
- Original network: Tokyo MX, Sun TV, KBS, TV Aichi, BS11, TVQ, TSC, AT-X
- English network: SEA: Animax Asia
- Original run: January 9, 2016 – March 26, 2016
- Episodes: 12
- Anime television series

Hina Logi ~from Luck & Logic~
- Directed by: Hiroaki Akagi
- Produced by: Hideyuki Yoshimura; Chū Matsuda; Yuki Muramatsu; Ryutaro Usukura; Kôichi Kudô
- Written by: Yukie Sugawara
- Music by: Ken Itō
- Studio: Doga Kobo
- Licensed by: Crunchyroll; SEA: Muse Communication
- Original network: AT-X, Tokyo MX, Sun TV, KBS, TV Aichi, BS11
- English network: SEA: Animax Asia
- Original run: July 1, 2017 – September 23, 2017
- Episodes: 12

Luck & Logic (ラクエンロジック, Raku en Rojikku) is a media franchise created by Bushiroad with five other companies: Bandai Visual, Doga Kobo, Nitroplus, Lantis, and Yuhodo. It consists of a trading card game, with the first products released on February 28, 2016, and an anime television series by Doga Kobo.

== Plot ==
=== Luck & Logic ===
In the year L.C. 922, mankind faces an unprecedented crisis. Following the conclusion of a hundred-year war on the mythical world of Tetra-Heaven, the losing demon gods sought a safe haven and invaded the human world Septpia. The government forced to fight by employing logicalists belonging to the Another Logic Counter Agency (ALCA), a special police that protects the streets from foreigners of another world. Logicalists are given a special power that allows them to enter a trance with goddesses from the other world. One day, Yoshichika Tsurugi, a civilian who is lacking "Logic" and lives peacefully with his family, meets the beautiful goddess Athena while helping people escape from a demon god attack. She wields the "Logic" that Yoshichika should have lost. This leads Yoshichika to an unexpected destiny with Athena. To the young logicalists whose natures are of "luck" and "logic", the future of the world has been entrusted.

=== Hina Logi ~from Luck & Logic~ ===
It has been a year since the demon gods attacked the city of Naien and the world is at peace once again. Liones Yelistratova, a princess from a small country, begins her study at a school which is a special facility run by ALCA who trains logicalists to protect the peace of the world. Liones has a lot of unique classmates in Class 1-S. They include Nina Alexandrovna, a mature but loner student who takes pride as a logicalist; Mahiro Kyobashi, a student with talents for technology and likes searching for foreigners; and Yayoi Tachibana, the elegant class representative.

== Luck & Logic characters ==
=== Logicalists ===
Yoshichika Tsurugi (剣 美親, Tsurugi Yoshichika)
Voiced by: Kenshō Ono (Japanese); Nathan Sharp (English)
The main protagonist of the series. Missing "logic" from a past tragedy, but despite this, he is living happily with his family. Becomes the covenanter of the Tetra-Heaven Foreigner "Goddess Who Rules over Wisdom and Strategy, Athena."
Tamaki Yurine (揺音 玉姫, Yurine Tamaki)
Voiced by: Risa Taneda (Japanese); Skyler Davenport (English)
Holds a leadership position among the Logicalists. Takes a tough attitude towards Yoshichika. Can both study and exercise, and is a serious class president type. Covenanter of "Goddess of Love and Beauty, Venus."
Chloe Maxwell (クロエ・マクスウェル, Kuroe Makusuweru)
Voiced by: Sora Tokui (Japanese); Megan Shipman (English)
A blonde girl, whose charm point is her ribbon and ponytail. Has a sporty and bright personality, and is friendly to anyone. Covenanter of "Goddess of War, Valkyrie."
Mana Asuha (明日葉 学, Asuha Mana)
Voiced by: Inori Minase (Japanese); Jad Saxton (English)
Reticent with sharp eyes, and does not have much of a relationship with others. She is always found listening to music on her headphones, and is often alone. Covenanter of "Goddess of the Moon, Artemis."
Veronica Ananko (ヴェロニカ・アナンコ, Veronika Ananko)
Voiced by: Risa Mizuno (Japanese); Janelle Lutz (English)
Chief of the Naien branch of ALCA. She serves as a mentor of logicalists, but also enters the battlefield herself. In the wake of a certain incident, she developed feelings of revenge against the foreigners from the parallel worlds. Covenanter of "Goddess of Wrath and Punishment, Nemesis."
Yukari Nanahoshi (七星 縁, Nanahoshi Yukari)
Voiced by: Aimi Terakawa (Japanese); Jeannie Tirado (English)
She was the manager of the women's high school soccer team, but was forcibly called to become a rookie Logicalist. She assumes the role of a supporting member and a caring person, but often does clumsy things. Later becomes the covenanter of "Snake God, Quetzalcoatl."
Olga Breakchild (オルガ・ブレイクチャイルド, Oruga Bureikuchairudo)
Voiced by: Yoshitsugu Matsuoka (Japanese); Ian Moore (English)
A logicalist belonging to ALCA. He was analyzed to have extraordinary potential as a logicalist, however later becomes the covenanter of "Ruler of Sept-Heaven, Lucifer."

=== Foreigners ===
Athena (アテナ, Atena)
Voiced by: Sumire Uesaka (Japanese); Alexis Tipton (English)
A goddess of the parallel world Tetra-Heaven. She meets Yoshichika and is sent into a lifestyle of cohabitation. A kind-hearted woman who hates it when precious life is lost. Is filled with a sense of justice.
Venus (ヴィーナス, Vīnasu)
Voiced by: Nao Tōyama (Japanese); Bryn Apprill (English)
A goddess who came from Tetra-Heaven together with Athena. Embraces all love in everything, and is characterized by falling in love immediately. At every opportunity, she speaks words of love to men and women alike.
Valkyrie (ヴァルキリー, Varukirī)
Voiced by: Chiaki Omigawa (Japanese); Sarah Wiedenheft (English)
A goddess of Tetra-Heaven, and the less talkative one between her and Chloe, her personality is the kind that does not understand jokes. Although she acknowledges Chloe's bravery in battle, she feels grief that she is at her mercy every day.
Artemis (アルテミス, Arutemisu)
Voiced by: Fumiko Orikasa (Japanese); Heather Walker (English)
A mysterious goddess who came from Tetra-Heaven. A woman who sings and loves poetry. She watches the school from a distance. She is nocturnal, and becomes sleepy if the moon is not out.
Nemesis (ネメシス, Nemeshisu)
Voiced by: Izumi Kitta (Japanese); Natalie Hoover (English)
A goddess of Tetra-Heaven with a sharp tongue. Zombie movies are a great favorite of hers, as she has a weakness for grotesque things. She has an erudite side, which does not suit her young appearance. Keeps a strict eye on young logicalists.
Quetzalcoatl (ケツァルコアトル, Ketsarukoatoru)
Voiced by: Ryū Nakatani (Japanese); Chris Guerrero (English)
An arrogant demon god who believes himself superior to human beings. However, he is willing to help people who he sees as giving him the proper respect a god deserves, including Yukari, who he sees as a high priestess of sorts. He eventually becomes the partner of Yukari.
Lucifer (ルシフェル, Rushiferu)
Voiced by: Kōsuke Toriumi (Japanese); Seth Magill (English)
A detached and somewhat aloof demon god, but affable in general conversation. He generally shows no ill will, even when talking to his enemies. His true goal is coexistence between humans and gods, a mission he honestly and strongly believes in. He eventually becomes the partner of Olga.

=== Other characters ===
Utsutsuno Jarno (ヤルノ うつつの, Yaruno Utsutsuno)
Voiced by: Hozumi Gōda (Japanese); Chuck Huber (English)
Director of ALCA.
Shiori Tsurugi (剣 しおり, Tsurugi Shiori)
Voiced by: Ai Kayano (Japanese); Jill Harris (English)
Yoshichika's younger sister.
Pieri Saotome (ピエリ早乙女)
Voiced by: Kana Ueda (Japanese); Kristi Kang (English)
One of the staff members in the command center of ALCA revealed to be a good hacker.
Logigraph (ロジグラフ, Rojigurafu)
Voiced by: Suzuko Mimori (Japanese); Caitlin Glass (English)
An earphone with a mic which generates a screen in front of the logicalists' eyes when activated. It has a variety of functions, including data analysis, communication, closing gates, and forming covenants. Staff members are responsible for analyzing and calculating data sent from Logigraphs.

== Hina Logi ~from Luck & Logic~ characters ==
=== Logicalists ===
Liones Yelistratova (リオネス • エリストラ一トヴァ, Rionesu Erisutorātova)
Voiced by: Madoka Asahina (Japanese); Brittany Lauda (English)
The eccentric but potentially powerful student of Pirari Academy. Introduced as a princess from a small country who always had the dream to become a logicalist. Develops a close friendship with Nina. Covenanter of "Flower Lips, Rosa" and "Innocent Running About, Waffle".
Nina Alexandrovna (ニーナ • アレクサンドロヴナ, Nīna Arekusandorovuna)
Voiced by: Hibiku Yamamura (Japanese); Leah Clark (English)
The soft-spoken student of Pirari Academy. Previously a professional logicalist from ALCA, but transferred to the academy to learn how to enjoy her youth. Develops a close friendship with Liones. Covenanter of "I'll Shoot!, Amor" and "Proud Archangel, Michael".
Mahiro Kyobashi (京橋万博, Kyōbashi Mahiro)
Voiced by: Natsumi Takamori (Japanese); Madeleine Morris (English)
The tech savvy student of Pirari Academy. Has a thirst for foreigners and their culture. Usually builds and carries gizmos and gadgets. Covenanter of "Preparing for Battle, Selen" and "Main Armament Fire, Dread".
Yayoi Tachibana (橘弥生, Tachibana Yayoi)
Voiced by: Suzuko Mimori (Japanese); Mikaela Krantz (English)
The ace student of Pirari Academy. Comes from a family of merchants that has built a conglomerate corporation. Covenanter of "Scepter Staff Technique, Qipao" and "Manipulating Airflow, Nagi".
Yuko Morigaya (森ヶ谷 タ子, Morigaya Yuko)
Voiced by: Kana Ueda (Japanese); Elizabeth Maxwell (English)
The resident advisor at Shirakaba Dormitory and the student council vice president of Pirari Academy. Covenanter of "Goddess of the Hearth, Vesta".
Karin Kiritani (桐谷華凛, Kiritani Karin)
Voiced by: Yui Ogura (Japanese); Michelle Rojas (English)
Twin sister of Karen and close friend of Yayoi. Wears a blue scarf.
Karen Kiritani (桐谷華恋, Kiritani Karen)
Voiced by: Kaede Yuasa (Japanese); Dawn M. Bennett (English)
Twin sister of Karin and close friend of Yayoi. Wears a red scarf.
Mizuki Azuma (東瑞希, Azuma Mizuki)
Voiced by: Maaya Uchida (Japanese); Amber Lee Connors (English)
The student council president of Pirari Academy. Shown to have unrequited romantic feelings towards Yuko.
Aoi Iroha (五六八 葵, Iroha Aoi)
Voiced by: Ayaka Ohashi (Japanese); Rachel Michelle Thompson (English)
The student council treasurer of Pirari Academy. Revealed to be a transfer student from ALCA to retrain as a logicalist.
Ashley Bradbury (アシュリー・ブラッドベリ, Ashurī Buraddoberi)
Voiced by: Mikoi Sasaki (Japanese); Kasi Hollowell (English)
The student council secretary of Pirari Academy. Revealed to be a transfer student from ALCA to retrain as a logicalist.

=== Foreigners ===
Rosa (ローザ, Rōza) and Vesta (ウェスタ, Wesuta)
Voiced by: Eriko Matsui (Japanese); Kristin Sutton (Rosa) and Tabitha Ray (Vesta) (English)
Rosa is a foreigner from Monolium who can control vines with her flowers. Vesta is a foreigner from Tetra-Heaven who can instantaneously complete household chores.
Amor (アモル, Amoru)
Voiced by: Rimi Nishimoto (Japanese); Marla Acevedo (English)
A foreigner from Tetra-Heaven, armed with a bow and arrow with the ability to pierce objects and wings for flight.
Qipao (七宝, Shippō) and Dread (ドレッド, Doreddo)
Voiced by: Izumi Kitta (Japanese); Didi Archilla (Qipao) and Kristen McGuire (Dread) (English)
Qipao is a foreigner from Disfia, armed with a scepter staff used for close combat. Dread is a foreigner from Tritomy, armed with an artillery mecha-type weapon used for far range.
Selen (セレン, Seren)
Voiced by: Yuka Ozaki (Japanese); Dani Chamers (English)
A foreigner from Tritomy, armed with a saber used for close combat and rocket boosters used for flight.
Michael (ミカエル, Mikaeru)
Voiced by: Aina Aiba (Japanese); Terri Doty (English)
A foreigner from Tetra-Heaven, armed with a sword and shield.
Waffle (ワッフル, Waffuru)
Voiced by: Ayano Yamamoto
A foreigner from Monolium, armed with dual blades.
Nagi (凪)
Voiced by: Ayasa Itō (Japanese); Trina Nishimura (English)
A foreigner from Disfia who can control wind with her feathers.

=== Other characters ===
Rino Fujisaki (藤崎梨乃, Fujisaki Rino)
Voiced by: Tomoyo Takayanagi (Japanese); Monica Rial (English)
The assistant homeroom teacher of Class 1-S of Pirari Academy.
Shizuha Kagura (神楽静葉, Kagura Shizuha)
Voiced by: Mai Aizawa (Japanese); Kristy Sims (English)
The homeroom teacher of Class 1-S of Pirari Academy.
Principal (学園長, Gakuen-chō)
Voiced by: Akiko Yajima (Japanese); Caitlin Glass (English)
The cloaked, harp-playing principal of Pirari Academy.
Kozue Amahara (天原 梢, Amahara Kozue)
Voiced by: Atsumi Tanezaki (Japanese); Colleen Clinkenbeard (English)
The bespectacled, hardworking vice principal of Pirari Academy.
Strafansky Yelistratova (スコラファンスキー・エリストラートヴァ, Sukorafansukī Erisutorātova)
Voiced by: Rikiya Koyama (Japanese); J. Michael Tatum (English)
Liones's father. Behaves like a helicopter parent around Liones despite his masculinity.
Linya Yelistratova (リーニャ • エリストラ一トヴァ, Rīnya Erisutorātova)
Voiced by: Marie Miyake (Japanese); Morgan Garrett (English)
Liones's mother. Behaves very sternly around Liones despite her femininity.

== Media ==
=== Anime ===
A 12-episode anime television series by Doga Kobo aired from January 9 to March 26, 2016. The opening theme is "STORY" by Kenshō Ono and the ending theme is "Meiyaku no Kanata" (盟約の彼方) by Emi Nitta.

A new 12-episode television series titled Hina Logi ~from Luck & Logic~ (ひなろじ〜from Luck & Logic〜) aired from July 1 to September 23, 2017. Funimation has streamed both series in North America. Muse Communication licensed both series in Southeast Asia.

=== Episode list ===
==== Luck & Logic ====
No.	Official English title (Note: All English titles are taken from Funimation.) Original Japanese title	Original release date
1	"Hero or Mob"; Transliteration: "Eiyū ka gunshū ka" (Japanese: 英雄か群衆か/Hero or Mob)	January 9, 2016
In a world called Septpia, Yoshichika Tsurugi is a teenage boy who lives at a cottage in the city of Naien with his younger sister Shiori Tsurugi and father Rentaro Tsurugi. As a paradox zone appears in the city, logicalists Tamaki Yurine, Chloe Maxwell and Mana Asuha manage to defeat a dog-like demon god named Cerberus, turning it back to a human and dog. While Yoshichika and Shiori head to the shopping center, a girl named Yukari Nanahoshi meets Veronica Ananko, the chief of a bureau called the Another Logic Counter Agency (ALCA) in the Naien branch, to test her abilities in order to make a covenant with foreigner Nemesis. While Yoshichika and Shiori try to buy a gift for Rentaro at the shopping center, a bull-like demon god named Belial appears, urging an evacuation. Yoshichika, who tells Shiori to take a young boy to a safe area, momentarily encounters foreigner Athena, who saves Yoshichika from being crushed. Tamaki, Chloe and Mana then arrive and manage to defeat Belial, turning it back to a baby bull. Although Belial escapes, Tamaki reports this to Veronica, who gives her permission to close the gate to the other world, thereby lifting the evacuation alert. In a field outside the city, Athena shows Yoshichika his lost logic card that she previously found on a shoreline, much to the worry of Shiori and Rentaro. When Belial wreaks havoc in the city, Athena reveals that Yoshichika dedicated his life to Hong Kong two years ago prior to losing his logic card after invoking the prohibited technique called overtrance against an enemy foreigner. Yoshichika and Athena then form a covenant and perform trance as they head towards the city. Yoshichika assists Tamaki, Chloe and Mana in defeating Belial. Then, Yoshichika says farewell to Shiori and Rentaro, as he moves to ALCA, where he would lodge and train with Athena.
2	"Genius or Fool"; Transliteration: "Tensai ka gusha ka" (Japanese: 天才か愚者か/Genius or Fool)	January 16, 2016
After Yoshichika and Athena wake up, Utsutsuno Jarno, director of ALCA, tells Yoshichika that he will undergo a trial period for the next couple days. During the meeting, logicalist Olga Breakchild warns Yoshichika that he will come to great harm during his trial, though Jarno tells Yoshichika to not worry about Olga. Veronica and Nemesis host a remedial class for all logicalists in training and their foreigners, though Olga does not attend. The realm called Tetra-Heaven inhabited by powerful gods and dragons has been attacking the city of Naien lately; a paradox zone is an other-worldly area that forms around invading foreigners; the ALCA is affiliated with the police department; there are five ALCA branches throughout the nation; and paradox sickness is when a person enters a paradox zone and gets trancejacked by an invading foreigner. With Chloe scoring the lowest on the questions, she makes massive burgers and fries for the class. Soon after, Yoshichika formerly introduces himself to the class, as he reveals that his trance time exceeds that of the other logicalists. Yoshichika, Tamaki, Chloe and Mana participate in a simulation program, fighting against a simulation of Belial. Veronica, Nemesis, Yukari and Olga observe as they discuss that an overtrance is forbidden. Yoshichika allows Mana to give the finishing blow, thereby clearing the program. Just then, a small threat is detected at a preschool playground, in which Veronica sends Yoshichika and Athena to defuse the situation. After performing trance with Athena and arriving at the preschool playground, Yoshichika discovers a small sand-like demon god named Sandman threatening preschoolers, but Yoshichika calmly tells him to release his trancejack, to which Sandman surrenders and releases a boy. Back at ALCA, Yoshichika confronts Olga for his suspicious behavior and treatment, since he planned to form a covenant with the captured Belial, and Athena reveals that Olga has no covenanter or experience with trance. Olga walks away without shame or embarrassment. Yoshichika is then summoned to a meeting with Tamaki and Jarno. Tamaki is consternated when Yoshichika is made the team leader, arguing against his promotion. She says that Yoshichika should have captured Sandman as soon as possible instead of talking to it. Jarno overrides Tamaki, causing her to leave the meeting.
3	"Dream or Reality"; Transliteration: "Risō ka genjitsu ka" (Japanese: 理想か 現実か/Dream or Reality)	January 23, 2016
Athena realizes that Yoshichika has trouble sleeping following the meeting with Tamaki and Jarno, while Tamaki is noticed by her covenanter Venus that she is upset for no longer being the team leader. After having lunch made by Yukari, Yoshichika goes to see Veronica, who tells him that Tamaki pursued to become a doctor specialized in paradox sickness before becoming a logicalist at ALCA. Just then, Pieri Saotome, a staff member in the command center of ALCA, identifies two demon gods as a Succubus and an Incubus invading the city, as a large paradox zone engulfs the area. During their mission, Yoshichika is paired with Tamaki against the Succubus, while Chloe is paired with Mana against the Incubus. While Chloe and Mana cooperate together in order to vanquish the Incubus, Yoshichika and Tamaki struggle to fight as a team and allow the Succubus to escape. Back at ALCA, Veronica orders Tamaki to return to her room, though Yoshichika realizes that Tamaki values human lives. When the Succubus is spotted again, Yoshichika and Athena are sent out with Veronica and Nemesis. Veronica easily overpowers the Succubus, much to Yoshichika's surprise, and the paradox zone diminishes. Tamaki and Venus are summoned to assist in the battle. When the Succubus still has energy left to fight back and threaten innocent civilians, Veronica orders Tamaki to kill the Succubus. Tamaki uses her Logic Drive to vanquish the Succubus. Over dinner, Chloe and the others encourage Tamaki to believe in Yoshichika. Saotome picks up a demon god on the radar, but the target is soon lost. Athena then leaves and finds the demon god named Lucifer, who has come to Septpia with an interest in performing trance.
4	"Freedom or Restraint"; Transliteration: "Jiyū ka sokubaku ka" (Japanese: 自由か 束縛か/Freedom or Restraint)	January 30, 2016
In the past, Chloe witnessed Tamaki defeating a spider-like demon god in a stadium before she got injured in battle. In the present, Chloe beats her personal running record, while Veronica investigates the last paradox level in the area. Chloe does some investigating on her own, finding out that a girl who lives at an estate is associated with Lucifer. When two demon gods are detected, Chloe meets with her foreigner Valkyrie at a school in an attempt to take out one of the demon gods by themselves. However, Yoshichika and Athena arrive just in time and prevent Chloe and Valkyrie from having a truck falling on them. Tamaki confronts Chloe for going against Yoshichika's orders. Jarno tell Veronica that one of Tetra-Heaven's rock stars will be making an appearance at ALCA. After Yoshichika wakes up, multiple demon gods are detected. Yoshichika and Athena perform trance at the paradox zone and face the jester-like demon gods encased in bubbles, while Tamaki and Chloe refuse to agree with one another on their way to the paradox zone. Yoshichika and Athena break their trance from being overwhelmed by the demon gods, which all fuse into a giant jester-like demon god called Joker. It is then that Tamaki and Chloe resolve their differences to prove that they can protect everyone and be the top ace, eradicating Joker. After dinner, Athena reveals to the others that the reason why her trance with Yoshichika did not go well was because she previously met Lucifer.
5	"Yesterday or Tomorrow"; Transliteration: "Kinō ka ashita ka" (Japanese: 昨日か 明日か/Yesterday or Tomorrow)	February 6, 2016
At nighttime, Mana wanders the streets looking for her parents, though her foreigner Artemis suggests for her to return to ALCA so the others would not worry about them. Meanwhile, Tamaki explains to the others that Mana was abandoned inside a coin locker during infancy before taken to an orphanage. Mana leaves a letter inside the coin locker for her parents to find, and she continued this process even after joining ALCA. Determined to open up to Mana, Yoshichika reveals that he used his overtrance in Hong Kong to preserve the life of the demon god prior to previously losing his logic card. When a large snake-like demon god named Quetzalcoatl is detected inside an electrical tower at a power station, Yoshichika, Tamaki, Mana and Chloe head to the paradox zone. However, Quetzalcoatl secretes venom that causes both Tamaki and Chloe to break trance and leave the electrical tower. Mana tries to stealthily attack the Quetzalcoatl from afar, but Yoshichika saves Mana after Quetzalcoatl still manages to bite back. Mana is treated for her wounds, but a citywide blackout takes effect due to the paradox zone inside the electrical tower. With hospital equipment now inoperable until the next day, Mana and Artemis perform trance and return to the electrical tower against Veronica's orders. As Mana explains her intentions of using her overtrance, which may save thousands of lives in the process, Veronica grants Mana permission to do so. Nonetheless, after having performed trance with Athena, Yoshichika appears before Mana and offers the option to fire at point-black range to avoid the risk of memory loss from her overtrance. Yoshichika then assists Mana in using close combat against Quetzalcoatl, who reverts to a baby snake form after being defeated. Mana later recuperates, surrounded by her peers. Quetzalcoatl, now captured at ALCA, is revealed to be settling a wager with Lucifer.
6	"Battle or Surrender"; Transliteration: "Taiketsu ka kōfuku ka" (Japanese: 対決か 降伏か/Battle or Surrender)	February 13, 2016
Yukari, a supporting member rather than a logicalist, idolizes Chloe for working so hard and wants to prove herself among the other logicalists. After visiting security guard Kitaoka, who is in charge of watching over Quetzalcoatl, Yukari brings exotic chocolates and drinks for Valkyrie, Venus and Artemis, as they discuss that Mana bonded more with Yoshichika than Artemis did. During a trance practice session, both Yukari and Olga try to perform trance with Athena, but the two fail in their attempt. Later on, Kitaoka checks on Quetzalcoatl in his basement cell, but Kitaoka ends up being trancejacked. Yukari, who was preparing a pot of soup for Kitaoka, encounters Quetzalcoatl in his large form. Due to her bravery, she gives him the pot of soup before stating her former position as the team manager of a soccer team. Meanwhile, Veronica sends Yoshichika and Olga to protect Yukari before they begin a rescue operation to destroy the floor under Yukari and Quetzalcoatl. Although Olga is spotted by his distractions, the floor is still detonated and Yoshichika manages to catch Yukari from falling onto the ground floor. When Veronica attacks Quetzalcoatl, Yukari steps in to protect Quetzalcoatl, urging Yoshichika to shield Yukari. Seeing this compassion finally allows Quetzalcoatl to give up Kitaoka being tracejacked, reverting Quetzalcoatl back to normal. While Yukari recuperates in the hospital, Quetzalcoatl allows her to form a covenant with him. During a second trance practice session, Yukari successfully performs trance with Quetzalcoatl, being able to fly in the sky.
7	"Human or God"; Transliteration: "Hito ka kami ka" (Japanese: 人か 神か/Human or God)	February 20, 2016
With the logicalists and foreigners taking an overnight vacation, Yoshichika brings Athena to spend time with Shiori and Rentaro at the cottage. Surprisingly, the other logicalists and foreigners were already there. It is revealed that Shiori sent birthday party invitations, even though it is not Yoshichika's birthday. After Rentaro arrives with Veronica and Nemesis, everyone prepares the meals and decorations on the outdoor dining table. Shiori tells Tamaki that their mother Kasumi passed away seven years ago. Rentaro asks Yoshichika about his crush, embarrassing Yoshichika in front of all the female houseguests. Later on, Athena goes out for a shopping run, prompting Yoshichika to find her. Athena encounters Lucifer in the streets, as he restates his purpose of coming to Septpia in order to find and enjoy paradise. He realizes that Athena has genuine feelings for Yoshichika, even though she plans to return to Tetra-Heaven after the war is over. Lucifer takes his leave as Yoshichika finds Athena, in which Yoshichika shows worry that Athena may trust Lucifer over him. Back at the cottage, Athena, Tamaki, Nemesis and Olga stay over with Yoshichika, Shiori and Rentaro, the latter of whom is passed out. In Shiori's bedroom, Shiori and Nemesis watch a scary movie on Shiori's computer, and Nemesis mentions that she is thousands of years older than Shiori. In the bathroom while taking a bath, after Athena expresses her concern to return to Tetra-Heaven after war is over, Tamaki voices her belief that Athena and Yoshichika were brought together for a reason. In Yoshichika's bedroom, after Yoshichika expresses his worry about Athena trusting Lucifer over him, Olga voices his thought that Lucifer's paradox is not a scale of intentions but rather a measure of power. After a mishap of Yoshichika trying to apologize to Athena while she is wearing a towel, Tamaki urges Yoshichika to properly apologize to Athena again with her clothes on. In a hospital room, Veronica and Nemesis visit a sickly patient named Ash Paxton, in which Veronica is revealed to be Ash's former subordinate.
8	"Guilt or Innocence"; Transliteration: "Yūzai ka muzai ka" (Japanese: 有罪か 無罪か/Guilt or Innocence)	February 27, 2016
Jarno shows Yoshichika a letter of resignation written by Veronica and Nemesis. He then explains that Ash was contracted with paradox sickness four years ago by a foreigner from the world of Monolium known as an ice belva and was airlifted to ALCA of the Sapporo branch in order to be quarantined. Three days ago, it was reported that the ice belva has been running wild after previously having been in tight containment. Yoshichika, Athena, Yukari and Quetzalcoatl are tasked to bring back Veronica and Nemesis, who have just arrived at ALCA of the Sapporo branch. Although Ash is safely quarantined and his logic cards are reportedly found, the ice belva is still a threat to the lab tower, prompting Veronica and Nemesis to travel via snowmobile in order to catch up to the ice belva. Yoshichika, Athena, Yukari and Quetzalcoatl finally make it to the lab, but Quetzalcoatl loses stamina due to having Yukari carry Yoshichika and Athena from the helipad to the lab. When Yoshichika and Athena leave to help Veronica and Nemesis, who have performed trance to fight off the ice belva, ALCA lab chief Orlov Tunguska sends drones after Yoshichika and Athena, forcing them to defend themselves before they plummet in an underground chamber full of encased foreigners. Thanks to Pieri's hacking skills, Yoshichika, Athena and Yukari are shown that Orlov experimented on Ash in an attempt to use an artificial overtrance with the ice belva. After Yukari and Quetzalcoatl finally find Yoshichika and Athena, the pairs perform trance. Yoshichika tries to reason with Veronica as she attacks the ice belva, but she refuses to listen. The lab tower is consequently destroyed, and Veronica withdraws after realizing that the ice belva was the victim the whole time. Yukari returns and restores the ice belva with one of Ash's logic cards, while Orlov is arrested by Jarno for his crime. Back at ALCA of the Naien branch, Veronica, who feels guilty for almost killing the ice belva, conducts member evaluations on the logicalists. Nemesis comments to Veronica that the logicalists are thought of as her comrades and her children.
9	"Enemy or Friend"; Transliteration: "Teki ka mikata ka" (Japanese: 敵か 味方か/Enemy or Friend)	March 5, 2016
Yoshichika, Tamaki, Chloe, Mana and Yukari complete another simulation program, destroy a simulation of a mask-like foreigner named Enlil in record time. Olga, who is still unable to participate, warns the others that vanity will work against them. After Yoshichika later thanks Olga for the advice, Olga goes to the basement cells and finds Enlil, who agrees to form a covenant with him for a day before mentioning that he has unfinished business with Lucifer. Meanwhile, Lucifer visits ALCA by means of intrusion, calmly telling Jarno that he plans to join ALCA with the intention of forming a covenant with someone. Although Olga is eager to offer himself, Jarno withholds Lucifer from forming the covenant just yet. This angers Olga as he starts a simulation program against a simulation of Sandman, but recent transfer receptionist Miki Shinobu manages to disable the program before Olga gets seriously injured. After Shinobu tells Olga that there must be someone that personally knew Lucifer, Olga returns to the basement cells and frees Enlil with the risk of giving him one day of freedom. Instead, Olga is trancejacked by Enlil, while Yoshichika, Tamaki, Chloe, Mana and Yukari are sent to fight off Enlil. Olga later wakes up in a hospital room, but his logic card is nowhere to be found. After it is believed that Enlil's release was an inside job, Veronica tasks the logicalists and foreigners to find Olga's logic card in the rubble. Shinobu visits Olga, who reveals that Enlil's basement cell actually opened on its own before he tried to open it himself. When Shinobu leaves, Lucifer soon arrives with Olga's logic card, much to Olga's surprise.
10	"Heaven or Hell"; Transliteration: "Tengoku ka jigoku ka" (Japanese: 天国か 地獄か/Heaven or Hell)	March 12, 2016
The other logicalists and foreigners realize that Olga has gone missing. Meanwhile, Olga and Lucifer travel to a temple full of worshippers who view Lucifer as their savior. After performing trance with Quetzalcoatl, Yukari manages to scout out for Olga and Lucifer from a bird's eye view. Staff members Clau Bo and Zera Garibaston later find out that Shinobu was the one who remotely opened Enlil's basement cell to previously release him. Quetzalcoatl is then interrogated by the other foreigners, who learn that Quetzalcoatl wagered with Lucifer for a gate card to Septpia in order to fight against the logicalists. Lucifer performs trance in front of the worshippers, proclaiming the symbol of potential power. As Olga tells the civilians in the city that ALCA are using logicalists as guinea pigs, Veronica allows Yoshichika to deploy with Athena as backup. Yoshichika arrives in the city and tries to reason with Olga, mentioning that Shinobu was the one behind Enlil's release. However, Olga still attacks Yoshichika, prompting Athena to come and suggest that they must perform trance while they still can. While Yoshichika defends against Olga's attacks, Mana reports to Veronica that the worshippers have contracted paradox sickness and are waiting to be trancejacked, undergoing voluntary logic card transplantation. Olga believes in creating a new world where Septpia and Tetra-Heaven coexist, though Yoshichika believes that Lucifer is using Olga as his pawn. When Olga overwhelms Yoshichika in combat, Tamaki, Mana, Chloe, Veronica and Yukari each arrive to fight back and assist Yoshichika. Nonetheless, Olga proves to be much more powerful than the others combined. Olga heads to the basement cells in ALCA, but is stopped by Jarno, who orders Olga to leave. Instead, Olga destroys all the basement cells containing all the captured demon gods. Olga and Lucifer return to the temple, where they ask worshippers whoever wishes to be trancejacked in order to make their paradise a reality. Meanwhile, the demon gods are let loose all over the city, creating multiple paradox zones. This opens a gate to Tetra-Heaven, which impresses Olga.
11	"Despair or Destruction"; Transliteration: "Zetsubō ka hametsu ka" (Japanese: 絶望か 破滅か/Despair or Destruction)	March 19, 2016
After only forty-nine percent of civilians are evacuated, Jarno brings his crew of staff members to take over the command center. The logicalists and foreigners perform trance as they are sent to various areas of the city. Yoshichika, Veronica, Yukari, Mana, Chloe and Tamaki each face off against Olga, Enlil, Sandman, Cerberus, Joker and Belial, respectively. Jarno, Pieri, Clau and Zera are confident that splitting up the logicalists in separate areas is the best tactic. Although the battle is tough for all logicalists, they manage to activate their Logic Drive in order to defeat the demon gods. However, only Yoshichika struggles against Olga, and Veronica still has enough energy to fight alongside Yoshichika. When Yoshichika activates his Logic Drive from his shield, he absorbs Olga's attacks and defends against Veronica's repelled attacks. Therefore, Yoshichika figures out that Olga's spear can either attack or defend at a time. Yoshichika throws his shield at Olga as a distraction, prompting Veronica to activate her Logic Drive in response. Olga activates his Logic Drive in retaliation to absorb hers, while Yoshichika has reached his trance limit. As Olga attacks again, Veronica jumps in front of Yoshichika and Athena before reaching her trance limit. He then leaves them by saying that it was never a real fight. Yoshichika and Athena are summoned to the simulation room full of civilians taking refuge, where they meet up with Shiori and Rentaro. While Veronica and Nemesis regain consciousness in the hospital, the paradox zones have gradually increased in the city. Yoshichika and Athena propose a risky operation to Jarno. After Yoshichika and Athena perform trance, Yoshichika goes to the gate, where he stands face to face against Olga. With permission from Jarno, Yoshichika uses overtrance before he begins his fight with Olga, who also uses overtrance in retaliation and spreads paradox sickness throughout the city.
12	"Luck and Logic"; Transliteration: "Un to ronri to" (Japanese: 運と 論理と/Luck and Logic)	March 26, 2016
Yoshichika purifies the paradox sickness, which even reaches the command center and heals the wounds of the ALCA members. Olga believes paradise is when a person is purged of logic that does not fit their soul and is granted what is truly ideal for them. Yoshichika disagrees by saying that paradise is a place you share with people you truly cherish, you build it together no matter the hardships and you protect it. Olga eventually does a critical move on Yoshichika, which causes the other ALCA members in the command center to worry. The other logicalists and foreigners leave the command center and arrive to support Yoshichika. Lucifer then temporarily takes over Olga's body and attacks the logicalists and foreigners, but Veronica blocks the attack and is consequently knocked out. Olga realizes that Lucifer formed a covenant with him because he was the most desperate. As Olga takes back control of his body, he enters a fight with Yoshichika, who urges Olga to find a way to coexist and put his vanity aside. However, Olga and Lucifer reaches their trance limit, causing many logic cards to scatter and the gate to seal. Later on, Athena wakes up in the hospital, surrounded by Venus, Valkyrie, Artemis, Nemesis and Quetzalcoatl, who reveal that Athena was sleeping for a week. Olga shows up with three floating homing bombs which will monitor his cockiness. It is shown that Olga kept one of Lucifer's logic cards, which contains the idea that humans and gods can coexist, after being permitted to return it to Lucifer in a basement cell. Olga tells Athena, Venus, Valkyrie, Artemis, Nemesis and Quetzalcoatl that there is still one logic card missing from each of them. When Shiori and Rentaro visits the dining area, it is revealed that Yoshichika lost his memories of Athena. A previous conversation with Yoshichika and Athena unveils that they knew that the logic cards would scatter across the world, but they promised that whoever would find their logic card first would grant the other's wish in return. Although the war between Septpia and Tetra-Heaven is finally over, the foreigners eventually decide to stay in Naien with the logicalists. Eventually, Yoshichika finds his logic card in the field outside city limits, where Athena and the others join him. Yoshichika wishes for them not to be formal, while Athena wants to make Yoshichika whole again.

==== Hina Logi ~from Luck & Logic~ ====
No.	Title (Note: All English episode titles are taken from Crunchyroll.)	Original release date
1	"Send Your Cute Hina on a Journey"; Transliteration: "Kawaii hina ni wa tabi o sasero" (Japanese: かわいいヒナには旅をさせろ)	July 1, 2017
In the same world called Septpia, one year after the incident with the demon gods in Naien, Liones Yelistratova, a princess from a small country, finally arrives with her small pet foreigner named Belle outside Pirari Academy. There, she meets Nina Alexandrovna, who freshens her up in clean clothes. They go to the staff room and talk to assistant homeroom teacher Rino Fujisaki, who says that the academy is a unique school that provides training for logicalists and is managed by ALCA. In the classroom, homeroom teacher Shizuha Kagura introduces Liones to the class, and instructs top student Yayoi Tachibana to give Liones a campus tour later on. Before class ends, Kagura mentions that the logicalist trainees will be a bother now that the world is at peace. During lunchtime in the courtyard, Yayoi and classmates Mahiro Kyobashi, Karin Kiritani and Karen Kiritani learn that Liones was taught by her mother at her castle during childhood before coming to the academy. Using a blank foreigner card that she previously received from Fujisaki, Liones unknowingly activates it and goes out of control as she is able to manipulate vegetation. Nina sees the chaos from afar and performs trance with her foreigner Amor in order to knock Liones back to her senses. After witnessing the aftermath, the Principal and vice principal Kozue Amahara discuss the surprising outcome of Liones performing trance by the use of a blank foreigner card. Although Liones idolizes Nina, the latter plans to return to ALCA someday, revealing herself as a logicalist. After a mishap of jumping off the academy entrance bridge into a river from a bonding moment, Liones and Nina arrive at Shirakaba Dormitory, where they meet resident advisor Yuko Morigaya, who instructs them to take a bath immediately. In the bathhouse, Yayoi, Mahiro, Karin and Karen bring Liones and Nina outside to the hot spring, where Liones reveals that she snuck onboard the luggage compartment of a ship then hitchhiked the rest of the way to the academy. As they all talk about their dreams of becoming logicalists, Liones stands up from the motivation but passes out in the bathwater due to the humidity.
2	"Transforming is Not Mastered in a Day / Rice Balls Over Flowers"; Transliteration: "Gattai wa ichinichi ni shite narazu / Hana yori onigiri" (Japanese: 合体は一日にしてならず / 花よりおにぎり)	July 8, 2017
Yayoi, Karin and Karen go to wake up Liones and Mahiro in the morning, only to find out that Mahiro is using Liones's bed for extra storage while Liones sleeps in the loft. Mahiro mentions that she did overnight cramming for today's midterms, something Liones was unaware of. After struggling to answer questions on her midterms, Liones comes across Yuko in the courtyard. Liones learns that Yuko is the student council vice president, while Mizuki Azuma is the student council president, Aoi Iroha is the student council treasurer and Ashley Bradbury is the student council secretary. Mizumi explains that Aoi and Ashley are transfer students who are logicalists on active duty. Realizing that Nina is also a transfer student, Liones wonders if Nina enjoys being at the academy. Later on, Liones witnesses a mock battle hosted by Fujisaki in the training grounds, where Yayoi performs trance with her foreigner Qipao and Nina performs trance with Amor. While Nina wins the mock battle, Fujisaki tells Liones that the logicalists and foreigners who now roam the country fought against the demon gods and helped preserve peace for everyone. In a chamber, Kagura has Liones use her blank foreigner card to summon her confirmed foreigner Rosa, which she formed a covenant with when she was two years old. Liones then successfully performs trance with Rosa. Later on in the homeroom classroom, Liones scores a fifteen percent on her first year mathematics midterm test. With Yayoi and Nina both having perfect scores, a flashback reveals to when Veronica Ananko first enrolled Nina in Pirari Academy despite her exemplary abilities. It is explained that Yayoi has a household of merchants that own the Tachibana Corporation, a worldwide financial conglomerate with one hundred branch offices and its headquarters located in Obihiro. In the hot spring, Nina contemplates being roped into seeing the cherry blossoms at a shrine with Liones and Mahiro on the upcoming Saturday, but Nina soon receives encouragement from Yuko. On Saturday, Liones, Nina and Mahiro follow the trail to the shrine, having a picnic under the cherry blossoms and resting until sunset. Nina finally understands what it means to let loose and have some fun. Kagura is later seen approaching the shrine with a bottle of sake, believing that all of her students are interesting.
3	"The Silver Grizzly -There is No Love Like a Child's-"; Transliteration: "Shirogane no gurizurī -Ko no kokoro oyashirazu-" (Japanese: 白銀のグリズリー -子の心親知らず-)	July 15, 2017
Fujisaki explains to the homeroom class that the known worlds are Monolium, Disfia, Tetra-Heaven, Tritomy and Septpia, in which Septpia is the only world where humans can open gates that connect the other worlds together. The Silver Grizzly, an armored man aboard a missile dispatched from an aircraft, heads towards Pirari Academy and bypasses the academy's defense system. Despite being knocked off the missile when Kagura launches a bazooka, the Silver Grizzly charges past the entrance of the homeroom classroom, prompting Fujisaki to give Kagura a naginata to defend herself. Ironically, it is revealed that the Silver Grizzly is actually Strafansky Yelistratova, Liones's father. At the Principal's office, Strafansky informs the Principal and Amahara that he contacted them about his arrival, but they only allowed him to visit Liones rather than let him live with her. Amahara pardons all the intrusive actions and allows Strafansky to visit Liones for the day. Strafansky proves to be a nuisance to Liones, especially during the lectures. During a mock battle on the field, Liones, Mahiro, Nina and Yayoi each perform trance in preparation. When Strafansky motivates Liones with an embarrassing childhood pastime, this causes Liones to trap Mahiro, Nina and Yayoi in her vines. Mahiro, who performed trance with Selen, flies to the disabled missile and activates it, which sends all four of them to the snowy mountains. Due to Nina becoming fond of a bear cub, the four girls are soon chased by a grizzly bear. Mahiro causes an avalanche, which covers them in a deep crevasse. While Fujisaki and Kagura prepare to go on a helicopter to find the location of the four girls, Strafansky travels north to the mountains on foot after a conversation with the Principal and Amahara, who warned Strafansky that Liones might cause a catastrophe with her powers if not controlled. Strafansky calls out for Liones, who performs trance to use her vines as a signal. When the grizzly bear finds the four girls, they are rescued by Strafansky in the nick of time, while the bear cub returns to the grizzly bear. Back at Shirakaba Dormitory, Nina wakes up with Yuko at her bedside, while Liones says goodbye to Strafansky, as she tells him that she has made new friends. Liones kindly retrieves her mother's home-cooked meals from Strafansky, while it is also clarified that Shirakaba Dormitory is an all-girls dormitory, much to Strafansky's dismay.
4	"Repay Kindness With Flowers"; Transliteration: "On o hana de kaesu" (Japanese: 恩を花で返す)	July 22, 2017
While Mahiro updates Yuko's computer operation system, Mahiro eventually asks for Yuko's computer password, in which Yuko reveals that her computer password is her birthday, June 17th. Mahiro and Yayoi are shocked to find out that Yuko's birthday is today. While Yuko finishes baking some cookies, Yayoi then proposes a strategy meeting to Liones, Nina, Mahiro, Karin and Karen about planning a surprise birthday party for Yuko. After they come up with ideas, they settle on having a pajama party. With food and decorations all planned out, Liones mentions that they still need to get Yuko a birthday present and a new pair of pajamas. As Liones wishes to go into town, Yayoi offers to accompany Liones, while Nina chooses to tag along to pick up a book at the library. Mahiro, Karin and Karen stay behind to take care of the decorations. Liones, Nina and Yayoi travel by train into town, but they fail to find a good gift. Meanwhile, Mahiro remotely hacks into Yuko's computer during its updating process, causing Yuko to leave her room and search for Mahiro just when Mizuki arrives to have a word with Yuko. Mahiro, Karin and Karen barge in the room, undoing the hack and cash in the favor of having Mizuki block Yuko from entering her room from the outside. Mizuki tries to keep a close eye on Yuko at the stairwell, but Yuko runs off again. Yuko performs trance with her foreigner Vesta in order to instantly clean the bathhouse. Liones, Nina and Yayoi find a cloaked girl, who reveals that she is looking for dahlia. After visiting many shops, they are unable to find dahlia, but manage to get seed packets. Liones performs trance with Rosa to spread the seeds in a field, growing lots of dahlia. After the cloaked girl leaves, Yayoi is upset to find out that the store already closed, unable to get a birthday present. After Yuko takes a bath, she returns to her room and the girls welcome her with a pajama party. It is implied that the cloaked girl is the Principal in child form, shown when Amahara is given a bouquet of dahlia as a gift after a long day of work. It is also shown that Mizuki personally invited Yuko to a romantic dinner, but Yuko has no idea about it.
5	"A Journey of a Thousand Miles Begins With Effort"; Transliteration: "Senri no michi mo doryoku kara" (Japanese: 千里の道も努力から)	July 29, 2017
The student council announces that class S is required to take a practical exam for their final exams in order to test their logicalist aptitude which will impact their future. Amahara adds that Chloe Maxwell, Mana Asuha and Yukari Nanahoshi, three active-duty logicalists, will appear as examiners for the practical exam. After training on her own with support from Karin and Karen for four days, Yayoi has a morning jog and catches sight of Nina, only for it to turn into a race. Although it ends in a draw, they recognize that they have competition for the practical exam. On the next day, Fujisaki explains that the practical exam is an obstacle course. The students must pass through the academy entrance bridge, the tall sheer cliff and the passageway as checkpoints before reaching the Principal's office, while protecting an assigned stuffed animal as a "survivor" along the way. At the academy entrance bridge, Kagura is armed with a naginata, but many students who had one-piece swimsuits under their uniforms jump into the river. At the tall sheer cliff, Mana and Yukari attack Karin and Mahiro, while Liones saves Yayoi from falling off. At the passageway, Nina has an intense battle with Chloe, but Nina loses when Mana and Yukari arrive as backup. Yayoi then arrives at the passageway to have a match with Chloe, but this is a ruse for Liones to sneak under the passageway onto the other side so Liones and Yayoi can cross. As the two finish the obstacle course, Yayoi tells Kagura that Liones remembered that the goal was to deliver the "survivors" to safety, which was why Yayoi let Liones finish in first place. Later at the hot spring, Yayoi considers Liones as her rival and friend, after the latter gave a list of good attributes about the former to Chloe, Mana and Yukari. On the following day, flyers are posted about the upcoming school festival which will open the academy to the general public on October 21st to 22nd. Liones is summoned by Kagura to an isolated room where she is given a mirror that gives off a green aura, exposing how much she entrusts herself to Rosa. Kagura warns Liones that she might damage herself and her surroundings if she does not retain her own will. Liones goes outside Pirari Academy and encounters Nina, as they head towards Shirakaba Dormitory together.
6	"Sleep Brings up a Hina Well"; Transliteration: "Neru hina wa sodatsu" (Japanese: 寝るヒナは育つ)	August 5, 2017
Nina, Yayoi, Karin and Karen find themselves in the sweltering heat when they arrive at Liones's castle. While Nina and Karen are still sleeping, Yayoi and Karin witness Strafansky digging in the ground by himself outside. Liones's mother Linya Yelistratova apologizes Yayoi and Karin for the broken air conditioning. Also, Liones and Mahiro are spotted exploring in the forest nearby. Linya tells Yayoi and Karin that Liones was sensitive during childhood until she spent more time with Strafansky. A flashback reveals that Strafansky personally brought Liones, Nina, Mahiro, Yayoi, Karin and Karen to the castle during their summer break. As Liones and Mahiro search for foreigners deep in the forest, they have a discussion about Belle and how it became a part of Liones's family. Mahiro also mentions that humans cannot travel to alternate worlds just yet. While Strafansky fires a flare for Liones and Mahiro to return to the castle, Nina, Yayoi, Karin and Karen have fun at the swimming pool, which Strafansky made by himself all day long. Liones and Mahiro join the others, as Linya tells Strafansky that Liones is doing fairly well at the academy on her own. At night, the girls go stargazing to see the meteor shower. Mahiro contemplates that humans do not have adaptive bodies, as it has been her dream to visit other worlds. When Liones sings a song, Strafansky arrives with sleeping bags and says that the song was originally sung by Rosa, who is from Monolium. Mahiro insists for Liones to perform trance, but Yayoi reminds Mahiro that students are not allowed to perform trance outside of school grounds according to the academy rules. On the next day, Nina, Mahiro, Yayoi, Karin and Karen prepare to return to the academy, while Liones stays with Strafansky and Linya at the castle for the remainder of summer break.
7	"Even Presidents Fall From Trees / You're a Hina if You Dance, And a President if You Just Look On"; Transliteration: "Kaichō mo ki kara ochiru / Odoru hina ni miru kaichō" (Japanese: 会長も木から落ちる / 踊るヒナに見る会長)	August 12, 2017
In the morning, Mizuki spies on Yuko through her binoculars from a tree. Yuko receives a phone call from Liones, who is excited to return to Shirakaba Dormitory tomorrow. After the sixth-year career counseling session, Yuko, Mizuki, Aoi and Ashley head into town by train as they discuss future plans for joining ALCA as a logicalist. It is shown that during her career counseling session, Yuko expressed second thoughts of joining ALCA despite having one of the best grades in her class. Mizuki tells Yuko, Aoi and Ashley that she plans to form a revolution, since there is no telling when danger lurks within world peace. Upon arriving in town, Yuko contemplates her future dreams of being a pastry chef, florist or pop star. Back at Shirakaba Dormitory, Yuko and Mizuki light up sparklers outside at night, as they discuss how they have known each other since kindergarten. After Mizuki encourages Yuko to follow her dream, Mizuki musters up the courage to invite Yuko to the upcoming Bon dance contest, only to be interrupted by the unexpected arrival of Liones, who brings Yuko back inside. All the girls finish studying in time to dress in yukatas and learn the Bon dance. At the Bon Festival in town, it is learned that the first prize medal for the Bon dance contest has gone missing, leaving only black feathers of a crow that soon flies by. Nina and Yayoi perform trance and manage to find the medal in a crow's nest. However, Liones spots Mizuki hiding on a tree branch, which Nina informs the other girls. Liones consequently exposes herself from below when climbing up the tree, while Mizuki passes out from a nosebleed. Nina later joins Liones, Mahiro, Yayoi, Karin and Karen in dance. Liones eventually wears the first place medal. Meanwhile, Yuko visits an injured Mizuki, declaring that her dream will be to watch over the other girls as they grow older to help them reach their full potential.
8	"Success Comes From Dreaming"; Transliteration: "Yume wa seikō no mono to" (Japanese: 夢は成功のもと)	August 26, 2017
After summer break has ended, Yayoi, Karin, Karen, Nina, Liones and Mahiro each showcase their unique research projects to Fujisaki and Kagura during homeroom class. However, Fujisaki and Kagura interrupt Mahiro's presentation of a power suit that could safely allow a human to enter a paradox zone. Before leaving, Fujisaki and Kagura nominate Yayoi as class project leader for the school festival soon approaching. A student council announcement informs that each class, committee and club will need to use the coexistence of foreigners as the theme in order to come up with an activity for the school festival, and a popularity contest will be run to increase morale across the student body. After Yayoi says that a maid cafe and a haunted house are poor ideas, Mahiro remembers the foreigner song when they were all stargazing. Although it is a good idea, Yayoi does not believe that one song would be enough for the activity. Instead, Mahiro comes up with the idea of a musical play. After proposing her idea to Fujisaki, Mahiro is surprisingly made the class project leader, which Yayoi believes that Mahiro deserves the role for being passionate about foreigners and their culture. Mahiro stays up all night working on the musical play. The next day during homeroom class, Mahiro has a dream where she is on stage with a monotonous foreigner from Tritomy named Robo-Girl. Later during a mock battle in the training grounds, Yayoi and Mahiro perform trance with their foreigners Nagi and Dread. During the match, Liones and Nina perform trance with their foreigners Waffle and Michael, and they change into Rosa and Amor halfway through. Back in the isolated room, Kagura gives Liones the mirror, which still gives off green aura from being paired with the childish Waffle. Kagura says that Liones has to train her heart and body in order to take full control of her foreigners, suggesting one-on-one combat training sessions. Meanwhile, with some divine intervention, Mahiro finally overcomes writer's block in the musical play. After Yayoi finds Liones sleeping in the dining hall, the two go to Yayoi's dorm room and discuss how Mahiro is determined to complete a task at hand. Later in the dorm lobby, Mahiro explains that the musical play is about a foreigner from Monolium who got lost and finds a local from Septpia, in which Nina and Liones will be cast as the leading roles.
9	"Songs Change With Hinas, and Hinas Change With Song"; Transliteration: "Uta wa hina ni tsure hina wa uta ni tsure" (Japanese: 歌はヒナにつれヒナは歌につれ)	September 2, 2017
In the middle of an important mission, Strafansky abruptly leaves the castle to attend the school festival, which takes place in four days. Meanwhile, Mahiro, Yayoi, Karin and Karen make stage preparations, while Liones and Nina rehearse their lines. However, with time running out, Fujisaki and Kagura make an announcement to allow overnight preparations. Nina hears Liones saying her lines naturally after the latter has an emotional connection to the past. During a rehearsal in the auditorium, Liones says her lines rather forced. When Mahiro tells Liones to perform trance as Rosa, Liones says her lines perfectly, leading Mahiro to recommend Liones to play as Rosa the entire time. On the day of the school festival, all students and parents enjoy the various stall booths. Strafansky and Mizuki compete in sending flyers regarding Liones and Yuko, who both have been nominated in the beauty contest. However, Linya arrives to take Strafansky away. During the musical play, Rosa and Nina give a spectacular performance in a forest background, but Rosa trips on a staircase and changes back to Liones. This prompts Nina to encourage Liones to sing the foreigner song, changing Liones back to Rosa as she continues to sing. Nina finishes the performance with Rosa by her side and a curtain call occurs shortly thereafter. Strafansky and Linya greet Liones outside. Veronica, having seen the musical play as well, appears to Nina, impressed that she is fitting in with the academy. At the award ceremony, Mizuki crowns Yuko as the winner of the beauty contest. Yayoi later tells Mahiro that the stage division still managed to get second place, despite the message that Mahiro was trying to convey through the foreigner song. Mahiro is shown to be dozing off, while Yayoi secretly thanks Mahiro for all her hard work.
10	"Our Tears Are Not For Our Own Benefit"; Transliteration: "Namida wa onore no tame narazu" (Japanese: 涙は己のためならず)	September 9, 2017
As winter break approaches, Fujisaki tells the homeroom class that the first year practical exam will be a tournament. Liones and Nina find out that they will be fighting against each other in the first round. Seeking the Principal for advice, Nina is determined to rank first in the final exam and return to ALCA in order to become a logicalist once again. Having performed trance with Waffle, Liones trains with Kagura in a one-on-one combat session in the training hall. Later, as the girls study during homeroom class, Nina questions Liones as to why she was in the training hall, but Liones plays it off and says she was in detention. During the first round of the tournament in the training grounds, Liones and Nina perform trance with Waffle and Amor, and they utilize performing trance with Rosa and Michael as well. However, Rosa takes full control of Liones and uses her vines to destroy the training grounds when Nina accuses Liones of keeping secrets. Liones regains control of Rosa and leaves the training grounds through the ceiling. Nina takes Belle with her, as they find Liones encased in vines in the snowy mountains. Nina and Belle manage to bypass the vines and reach Liones, who finally comes to her senses. Nina passes out after apologizing to Liones. Belle reveals its true form to Liones, allowing Liones to perform trance with Belle and heal Nina's wounds. Back at Pirari Academy, Fujisaki tells Liones and Nina that the first year practical exam has been cancelled, their grades will be calculated based on previous assignments and the whole incident will be reported to ALCA. At the academy entrance bridge, Liones and Nina reconcile. Liones and Nina sing the foreigner song as they head to Shirakaba Dormitory, where the other girls are waiting for them.
11	"The Countdown is the Time To Plan Your Year Around / Shameful is She Who Spurns Chocolate"; Transliteration: "Ichinen'nokei wa kauntodaun ni ari / Sue choko kuwanu wa on'na no haji" (Japanese: 一年の計はカウントダウンにあり / 据えチョコ食わぬは女の恥)	September 16, 2017
While Mahiro, Yayoi, Karin, Karen and Yuko leave Nina all alone in charge of Shirakaba Dormitory for the winter break, Liones decides to stay and accompany Nina for New Year's Eve. In Nina's dorm room, Liones encourages Nina to snuggle up in a kotatsu while eating mandarin oranges. When the doorbell suddenly rings, Liones answers the door after losing a staring contest with Nina. Liones comes back with a package containing a red king crab. Wasting no time to eat, Liones and Nina soon realize that the package was for Fujisaki, having to discreetly deliver an apology package containing marine blue crab sticks to Fujisaki and Kagura. As the midnight hour approaches, Liones and Nina slurp on soba and reminisce on their thankful moments during the past year. As soon as it strikes midnight, Liones kisses Nina to honor her family tradition of New Year's Day. As Valentine's Day later rolls around, Yuko has baked chocolate cupcakes in her dorm room, giving some for Liones and Yayoi to sample. Yuko encourages Liones to bake a chocolate cupcake for Nina, with Yayoi there to accompany them. Liones ends up setting the oven timer and temperature wrong, causing the oven to malfunction. Mahiro shows up to use her miniature robot in an attempt to fix the oven, which goes haywire and launches itself at Liones. Nina, who performed trance with Amor, arrives and shoots an arrow at the oven in order to suspend it. Once three chocolate cupcakes are done baking, Liones gives one of them to Nina, who is satisfied with the taste. While Yayoi plans on giving the remaining two cupcakes to Karin and Karen, Nina confesses her love to Liones out of the blue. Mahiro theorizes that Nina acted as Cupid when her arrow shot through the oven, which resulted in Nina being lovestruck for Liones. Knowing that would also taint the cupcakes, Mahiro takes a bite out of one, causing her to fall in love with Yayoi. Karin and Karen walk in and join Mahiro in caressing Yayoi. Yuko takes the last cupcake and runs out her dorm room, only to bump into Mizuki, who mistakes the cupcake as a gift. When Mizuki eats the cupcake, Yuko perceives Mizuki's genuine feelings as being brainwashed by the cupcake. After a few hours, the effects of the cupcakes wear off. Liones hugs Nina after receiving a gift from her.
12	"Good Fortune Will Come to Hinas Who Smile"; Transliteration: "Warau hina ni wa fuku kitaru" (Japanese: 笑うヒナには福きたる)	September 23, 2017
The training grounds are now repaired, while Liones and Nina will not be reprimanded for what happened during the practical exam. In the staff room, Nina is later told by Fujisaki and Kagura that she will be interviewed by Veronica to return to ALCA. Yayoi and Karin, who were eavesdropping, inform Liones, Mahiro and Karen about Nina rejoining ALCA before graduation. Liones passes by Yuko, who is preparing to move out of her dorm room. Yuko reminds Liones of all the friends that she has by her side. Mahiro, Yayoi, Karin and Karen try to entice Nina to stay at the academy, but their plan backfires. In the bathhouse, Mahiro tells Yayoi that Nina should return to ALCA to fulfill her dreams. In Liones's dorm room, Liones and Nina look at candid pictures of Nina while they discuss about cherry blossoms. The next day, Mahiro and Yayoi challenges Nina to a match in the training grounds. As Mahiro and Yayoi declare that this would be the last challenge against Nina, she easily defeats them in one move. After graduation, Yayoi and the others congratulate Yuko, who is assigned at the same ALCA office as Mizuki. Just then, the cherry blossoms magically bloom, prompting Nina to run across the academy entrance bridge past Veronica, the Principal and Amahara. Nina finds Liones, who performed trance with Rosa, as they know this will be their final farewell. However, Nina embraces a crying Liones after saying that the academy is where her precious friends are. After seeing Yuko and Mizuki off, Liones tells Nina that she wants to be a logicalist who helps those in danger and who supports those doing their best but need a little boost. Nina decides to stay at the academy in order to study more and get stronger. As Liones and Nina return to the academy entrance bridge, Mahiro, Yayoi, Karin and Karen are estatic when Liones says that Nina referred to them as precious friends. Another bonding moment results in a mishap of jumping off the academy entrance bridge into the river, where Liones happens to catch a fish.

== Trading card game ==
The Luck & Logic trading card game was officially released in Japan on January 28, 2016. Trial deck 1 and 2, Brave Logic and Rinne Logic respectively, as well as the first booster expansion, Growth & Genesis, was released in English on June 24, 2016. Booster set 5, Trance Re:union, was the last set released for English edition of the game, which was released on March 31, 2017.

=== Gameplay ===
Luck & Logic is played between two players with pre-constructed decks. Players take turns playing cards, using abilities, and initiating battles. The game ends when one of two win conditions are met.

=== Win conditions ===
There are two win conditions in Luck & Logic. A player wins by destroying all six of his opponent's gates or when his opponent refreshes twice. Refreshing is the act of shuffling one's drop zone (discard pile) back into the deck.

=== Deck construction ===
These decks consist of 60 cards in total, 50 cards in the main deck and 10 cards in the gate deck. The main deck contains member, tactics, and paradox cards, and the gate deck must consist of exactly 10 gate cards. You may have up to four cards of the same name in the main deck, and up to two cards of the same Gate number in the gate deck.

=== Card types ===
==== Member ====
There are three types of members in Luck & Logic: Logicalists, Foreigners, and Tranceunions.

Logicalists and Foreigners are members that can combine through Trance to form Tranceunions. These members can be played from hand or "sortied" by paying its cost using "stock," as long as its level is equal to or less than the number of cards in the player's level zone. Tranceunions may have a Logic Drive ability that can be played in the main phase, as long as the Tranceunion has "soul" under it. Tranceunions obtain "soul" when they are played through the Trance method. If they are played from the hand without using Trance, they do not have "soul" and cannot use their Logic Drive.

==== Tactics ====
Tactics cards are "event" cards that can be played during a battle, and they give the player's member an advantage in the battle.

==== Paradox ====
Paradoxes are horizontal cards that, like Tactics cards, can be played during a battle. These paradoxes change the rules of the battle and may swing the outcome of the battle.

==== Gate ====
These are the cards that make up the gate deck. The gate cards are placed face-down on every circle. When a gate is destroyed, it is flipped face-up. Destroying all of the opponent's gates is a win condition.
