= Idaten Jump =

Japanese anime series

- First tankōbon volume cover, featuring Sho Yamato

IDATEN翔 (Idaten Janpu)
- Genre: Isekai, sports (Cycling)
- Manga
- Written by: Toshihiro Fujiwara
- Published by: Kodansha
- Magazine: Comic BomBom
- Original run: 2005 – 2006
- Volumes: 5
- Anime television series
- Directed by: Takayuki Hamana
- Produced by: Fukashi Azuma; Tomoko Gushima; Shinsaku Hatta; Kaori Yonashiro
- Written by: Toshihiro Fujiwara
- Music by: Yasuharu Takanashi
- Studio: Trans Arts
- Licensed by: NA: Hasbro
- Original network: TXN (TV Tokyo)
- English network: CA: YTV; IN: Nick; SEA: Animax; US: Cartoon Network
- Original run: October 1, 2005 – September 30, 2006
- Episodes: 52

Idaten Jump (Japanese: IDATEN翔 / 韋駄天翔, Hepburn: Idaten Shō) (Note: While 韋駄天 can be translated as Great Runner in the series' context, 翔 can be referred to as Jump or the protagonist's name.) is a Japanese manga series created by Toshihiro Fujiwara. It was serialized in Kodansha's Comic BomBom. The manga tells the story about a boy named Sho Yamato who loves mountain biking. It was adapted into a 52-episode anime series produced by Aniplex, TV Tokyo and TV Tokyo MediaNet, animated by Trans Arts and directed by Takayuki Hamana, with Fumihiko Shimo writing the scripts, Miyako Yatsu designing the characters and Yasuharu Takanashi composing the music. It aired from October 1, 2005, to September 30, 2006. A toyline was also made by Tomy.

== Summary ==
One day, the MTB team "Sharktooth" created by the Samejima brothers, who are also in the same elementary school, are challenged to an MTB battle for the "X-Zone," a place that holds memories of their dead father. On Sunday, while Shou and the leader Gabu were competing, black smoke enveloped the area and they were warped into a mysterious world. An adult MTB rider appears in front of the bewildered group and announces that they are in the X-Zone where they must compete with him in the Idaten Battles. In order to return to the original world, they must win the Idaten Battles and collect 10 gold emblems.

== Characters ==
=== Main ===
Shou Yamato (山登 翔, Yamato Shō)
Voiced by: Akeno Watanabe (Japanese); Yuri Lowenthal (English)
Sho Yamato is a boy who loves MTB riding and he owns the Idaten Bike Flame Kaiser.
Makoto Shidou (獅堂 まこと, Shidō Makoto)
Voiced by: Sawa Ishige (Japanese); Dorothy Elias-Fahn (English)
Makoto Shido is best friends with Kakeru Sakamaki and Shou. They are classmates at their school. Her Idaten Bike is Neptune.
Kakeru Sakamaki (坂巻 駆, Sakamaki Kakeru)
Voiced by: Makoto Tsumura (Japanese); Philece Sampler (English)
Kakeru is one of the main characters in the series. His main job in their team is to fix Shou, Makoto and Ayumu's bikes and also to change their bikes' gears whenever they are going to have an Idaten Battle.
Hosuke (ホースケ)
Voiced by: Chō (Japanese); Michael Sorich (English)
Hosuke is a talking owl who befriends Shou, Makoto, and Kakeru. He has become their companion during their travels through the X-Zone.

=== Supporting ===
Kyouichi Shidou (獅堂 京一, Shidō Kyōichi)
Voiced by: Daisuke Namikawa (Japanese); Dave Wittenberg (English)
Kyoichi Shido is Makoto Shido's elder brother. He is amazingly talented at everything, especially mountain biking. He is very protective towards his sister, also being a serious person. In the first few episodes, he used to follow Makoto, Shou, Kakeru and Hosuke but he always kept his distance. His MTB is Thunder Emperor and he is really an awesome unbeatable and impeccable rider, being a trial bike champion.
Yuuki (ユウキ)
Voiced by: Risa Mizuno (Japanese); Michelle Ruff (English)
Yuki is a mechanic who is one of the protagonists of the anime. She is actually a princess from a very respected family. She is an expert mechanic and helps Shou and co. on various occasions. Arthur and Yuki have helped protect the secrets of the X-Zone. She has been wanting to be a mechanic from her childhood. She is Hosuke's granddaughter.
Koei (孤影)
Voiced by: Eiji Takemoto (Japanese); Steve Blum (English)
Koei is a ninja rider hired Gabu Samejima and was a member of Team ST. It is later revealed that he did so because he could not afford a doctor for his sister, Kiku. Once Kiku fell in Gabu's clutches, Shou had to help rescue her. He rides the Idaten Bike Aero Scissors. His special move is the "Ninjutsu Hurricane" by which he can create a hurricane around him.
Arthur (アーサー, Āsā)
Voiced by: Yūji Kishi (Japanese); Brian Beacock (English)
Arthur is a Knight biker and the owner of the sixth Idaten Bike Hammer Head. He is one of the guardians of the X-Tower.
Ayumu Yamato (山登 あゆむ, Yamato Ayumu)
Voiced by: Chiro Kanzaki (Japanese); Mona Marshall (English)
Ayumu Yamato is Shou's younger brother. He joins the group during their return to the X-Zone. Ayumu used to behave like a maniac and ride without any control when riding MTB's until Koei taught him about control. He rides the Idaten bike Imperial Dragon.
Takeshi Yamato (山登 猛, Yamato Takeshi)
Voiced by: Hozumi Gōda (Japanese); Steve Blum (English)
Takeshi Yamato is Shou's father. While falling off his bike in an accident, he was transferred to the X-Zone to repair Imperial X. He had built Flame Kaiser, Thunder Emperor, Neptune, Imperial Tiger, Imperial Dragon, Aero Scissors, Hammer Head and Bloody Fang as well. Possessed by an ancient evil, he rode Imperial X whose attack was Even's Destruction. He defeated Flame Kaiser and took away its emblem but lost in the rematch where Shou rode with the combined forces of Bloody Fang, Thunder Emperor, Aero Scissors, Hammer Head, Imperial Dragon and Neptune. He made the Idaten Bikes to restore and maintain peace in the X-Zone and protect Imperial X.

=== Team Shark Tooth ===
Team Shark Tooth (チーム・シャーク・トゥース, Chīmu shāku to~ūsu) is a group of MTB riders that serve as the primary antagonists of the first half of the series. Upon their invasion on X-City, they went by the name of Team ST (チームST, Chīmu ST) and gained some followers in the process.

Gabu Samejima (鮫島 牙舞, Samejima Gabu)
Voiced by: Aki Kanada (Japanese); Kirk Thornton (English)
Gabu Samejima is the strongest MTB Rider along with Kyoichi Shido. He rides the powerful Idaten bike, Bloody Fang. Gabu and Taiga Samejima are the leaders of Team Sharktooth aka Team ST. He goes to the same school as Shou, Makoto, and Kakeru. When Team Sharktooth arrived in the X-Zone, Gabu became the dictator of X-City after overthrowing its mayor.
Taiga Samejima (鮫島 大牙, Samejima Gabu)
Voiced by: Toshiyuki Kusuda (Japanese); Steve Staley (English)
The older brother of Gabu who serves as his second-in-command of Team Sharktooth.
Four Kings (四天王, Shiten'nō)
Kiyoshi Voiced by: Yū Urata (Japanese); Brian Beacock (English)
Mitsuru Voiced by: Kōta Suzuki
Seiji Voiced by: Hiroshi Shimozaki
Mantarou Voiced by: Takehiro Hasu
Kiyoshi (キヨシ, Kiyoshi), Mitsuru (ミツル, Mitsuru), Seiji (セイジ, Seiji), and Mantarou (マンタロー, Mantarou) are four MTB riders that are the members of Team Sharktooth.
Jackal (ジャッカル, Jakkaru)
Voiced by: Yoshirō Matsumoto (Japanese); Kirk Thornton (English)
Jackal is a ship captain who is a member of Team ST. He and his crewmen challenged Shou when Shou was on a ship to X-City. They did get away with some of Shou's Emblems at the cost of Captain Jackal's ship and handed them to Gabu and Taiga.
Youko & Rika (ヨウコとリカ, Yōko to Rika)
Youko Voiced by: Rio Natsuki (Japanese); Mona Marshall (English)
Rika Voiced by: Noriko Namiki (Japanese); Philece Sampler (English)
Yoko and Rika are two sisters who are resort tycoons in Gold Celebresort City and members of Team Shark Tooth. Yoko is a MTB rider while her sister Rika is a mechanic.
Mr. Teacher (ミスターティーチャー, Misutā Tīchā)
Voiced by: Ben Takada (Japanese); Kirk Thornton (English)
A teacher-themed biker in a school theme park and member of Team ST.
Prince Ryota
Voiced by: Mona Marshall
Ruler of a kingdom in the middle of a lake. Despite being a member of Team ST, Prince Ryota isn't like the other members of that group.
Sebastian
Voiced by: Michael Sorich
Sebastian is a butler who serves Prince Ryota.
Pete & Danny (ピートとダニー, Pīto to Danī)
Pete Voiced by: Yasuyuki Kase (Japanese); Kirk Thornton (English)
Danny Voiced by: Junji Kitajima (Japanese); Michael Sorich (English)
Two eyepatch-wearing members of Team ST.
Shadow (シャドウ, Shadō)
Voiced by: Kenjiro Tsuda (Japanese); Paul St. Peter (English)
Shadow is a mysterious assassin biker and member of Team ST. He specializes in battling in dark places like subways etc.
Team ST MTB Riders
The generic grunts of Team ST.

=== Team X ===
Team X (チーム X, Chīmu X) is a team of mountain bikers that serve as the primary antagonists for the second half of the series. They invaded X-City and turned everyone they defeated into their slaves with the Dark Emblems they placed on their MTBs. Their base is on Imperial Island. Among the known victims are:

Fisherman Masagi
Voiced by: Michael Sorich
A fisherman MTB Rider and his fellow villagers who ended up under the control of Team X.
Count Freddy
A vampire-like MTB Rider under the control of Team X who resides in a haunted mansion.
Spike and Whip
The male and female MTB Rider duo. They lost against Sho Yamato and Gabu Samejima in an Idaten Battle.
Imperial Knights
The white-suited MTB riders that appear in large groups in Imperial Island. They serve as the foot soldiers to Team X.

=== Minor characters ===
Masumi Yamato
Voiced by: Philece Sampler
Masami is Sho and Ayumu's mother and the wife of Takeshi.

Masumi Yamato is quite strict but cares a lot about Sho and Ayumu. She doesn't like that Sho keeps riding his MTB and doesn't care about doing anything else. She is very loving towards Takeshi Yamato (her husband) too.

Rogue MTB Riders Leader (町のボス)
Voiced by: Michael Sorich
An outlaw biker whose real name is unknown, but is referred to as "The Boss."
X-Zone Police Captain (警備隊長)
Voiced by: Kirk Thornton
An unnamed police officer and Captain of the Northern Guard who arrests unsanctioned Idaten Battlers.
Shin the Shadow (シン)
Voiced by: Jin Domon (Japanese); Kirk Thornton (English)
A cowboy biker. His winning secret is that he has a twin brother taking over the course in the middle of Idaten battle.
Terry the Megaton (テリー)
Voiced by: Eiji Takemoto (Japanese); Steve Blum (English)
A heavyset MTB Rider in a bear-skinned cape who is the leader of Team Bandits (チーム・バンディッツ).
Zentaro (ゼンタロウ)
Voiced by: Hidenobu Kiuchi (Japanese); Steve Blum (English)
A professional MTB rider who owns a bike shop in Volcano Village.
Takuma (タクマ)
Voiced by: Kentarou Itou (Japanese); Kirk Thornton (English)
Leader of the Poison Spider (毒グモ団) MTB Team.
Seiji (セイジ)
Voiced by: Brian Beacock
Leader of the Hyper Brain (ハイパーブレーン) MTB team.
Jun (淳)
Voiced by: Mona Marshall
The mechanic of the Hyper Brain MTB team.
Tasuku (たすく)
Voiced by: Kirk Thornton
The rider for the Hyper Brain MTB team.
Ken (ケン)
Ken's Male Voice Voiced by: Steve Staley
Ken's Female Voice Voiced by: Philece Sampler
He and his henchmen disguised themselves as girls to learn Sho's weaknesses from Hosuke.
Native MTB Rider
Voiced by: Dave Wittenberg
An unnamed MTB Rider in a tiki mask whose team made use of the hallucinative mist that was in the temple they operated in.
Gen
Voiced by: Hideyuki Umezu (Japanese); Steve Blum (English)
An MTB rider who lives in the snowy mountains with his daughter Rin. In Gabu's tournament in X-City, he lost to Taiga. He was eventually returned to Earth where he was seen fighting Ken and his minions on TV.
Rin (リン)
Voiced by: Michelle Ruff
Daughter of Gen.
Go
Voiced by: Steve Blum
An MTB Rider in a miner town who claimed that he beat Flame Kaiser.
Sunset Brothers
Sunset Joe Voiced by: Unavailable
Sunset Reiu Voiced by: Michael Sorich
Joe and Reiu are the gatekeepers of the North Gate of X-City.
Mayor of X-City
Voiced by: Paul St. Peter
The unnamed mayor that ruled X-City before Gabu overthrew him.
Bonnie C
Voiced by: Megan Hollingshead
She serves as emcee of Gabu's tournament in X-City.
Nostradamus Saiyaka
Voiced by: Mona Marshall
An MTB Rider who can predict the future.
Kiku (菊(キク))
Koei's younger sister.
Takahiro
A boy who had lent his bike to Ayumu during the match between Sho Yamato and Jero in real world.
Ichibashi and Honda
Yuki's trusted MTB trainers who resided in the X-Zone.
Germ Man
Voiced by: Michael Sorich
A microbial MTB rider.

== Episodes ==
No.	Title	Directed by	Written by	Original release date
1	"This Is the MTB Battle!"; Transliteration: "Kore ga MTB batoru da!" (Japanese: これがMTBバトルだ！)	Takayuki Hamana	Fumihiko Shimo	October 1, 2005
2	"The Great Flight! Struggle at the Dunes"; Transliteration: "Daidassō! Sakyū no tatakai" (Japanese: 大脱走！砂丘の戦い)	Jun Takahashi	Fumihiko Shimo	October 8, 2005
3	"Shocking! The First Defeat?!"; Transliteration: "Shōgeki! Hajimete no haiboku!?" (Japanese: 衝撃！はじめての敗北！？)	Kazunobu Fuseki	Fumihiko Shimo	October 15, 2005
4	"Get Back My MTB!"; Transliteration: "Torimodose! Ore no MTB" (Japanese: とり戻せ！オレのMTB)	Yoshihiro Mori	Shinzō Fujita	October 22, 2005
5	"Flaming Volcano Battle!"; Transliteration: "Honō no kazan batoru!!" (Japanese: 炎の火山バトル！！)	Jun Takahashi	Kōji Miura	October 29, 2005
6	"Challenge of the High-Tech Group"; Transliteration: "Haiteku shūdan no chōsen" (Japanese: ハイテク集団の挑戦)	Hajime Tanaka	Natsuko Takahashi	November 5, 2005
7	"Augh! The MTB Graveyard"; Transliteration: "Au! MTB no hakaba" (Japanese: アウッ！MTBの墓場)	Yukio Okazaki	Fumiyo Sakai	November 12, 2005
8	"Enter Neptune!"; Transliteration: "Nepuchūn tōjō!" (Japanese: ネプチューン登場！)	Kenichi Matsuzawa	Kiyoko Yoshimura	November 19, 2005
9	"The Masked Boy's True Identity!"; Transliteration: "Kamen shōnen no shōtai!" (Japanese: 仮面少年の正体！)	Kazunobu Fuseki	Fumihiko Shimo	November 26, 2005
10	"The Strongest Enemy Appears!"; Transliteration: "Saikyō no teki, shutsugen!" (Japanese: 最強の敵、出現！)	Shu Longju	Shinzō Fujita	December 3, 2005
11	"Battle on the Ship! Team ST's Trap"; Transliteration: "Senjō batoru! Chīmu ST no wana" (Japanese: 船上バトル！チームSTの罠)	Jun Takahashi	Kōji Miura	December 10, 2005
12	"The Gold Celebrity Resort City of My Dreams"; Transliteration: "Akogareno gōrudo serebu rizōto shiti" (Japanese: 憧れのゴールドセレブリゾートシティ)	Daisuke Takashima	Kiyoko Yoshimura	December 17, 2005
13	"School Battle! Explosive Idaten Cross!"; Transliteration: "Gakkō batoru! Sakuretsu, idaten kurosu!" (Japanese: 学校バトル！炸裂、韋駄天クロス！)	Shunsuke Tada	Fumiyo Sakai	December 24, 2005
14	"The Man Who Beat Flame Kaiser?!"; Transliteration: "Fureimu kaizā o taoshita otoko!?" (Japanese: フレイムカイザーを倒した男！？)	Kazunobu Fuseki	Natsuko Takahashi	December 31, 2005
15	"The Prince of MTB"; Transliteration: "MTB no ōji-sama" (Japanese: MTBの王子様)	Jun Takahashi	Kiyoko Yoshimura	January 7, 2006
16	"Mortal Struggle In the Rain, Awaken Neptune"; Transliteration: "Ame no naka no shitō, mezameyo Nepuchūn" (Japanese: 雨の中の死闘、目覚めよネプチューン)	Yoshihiro Mori	Kōji Miura	January 14, 2006
17	"Team ST's Secret Finally Learned"; Transliteration: "Tsuini wakatta! Chīmu ST no himitsu" (Japanese: ついにわかった！チームSTの秘密)	Daisuke Takashima	Fumihiko Shimo	January 21, 2006
18	"A New Assassin! Sibling Battle Trial"; Transliteration: "Arata na shikaku! Shiren no kyōdai batoru" (Japanese: 新たな刺客！試練の兄妹バトル)	Yasunori Urata; Yasuyuki Yamada	Fumiyo Sakai	January 28, 2006
19	"Showdown! Flame Kaiser VS Thunder Emperor"; Transliteration: "Taiketsu! Fureimu Kaizā VS. Sandā Enperā" (Japanese: 対決！フレイムカイザーVS.サンダーエンペラー)	Kenichi Matsuzawa	Shinzō Fujita	February 4, 2006
20	"Formidable Enemy! Ninja Rider Koei"; Transliteration: "Kyōteki! Ninja raidā Koei" (Japanese: 強敵！忍者ライダー孤影)	Shu Longju	Shinzō Fujita	February 11, 2006
21	"The Gatekeeper of X City"; Transliteration: "X shiti no monban" (Japanese: Xシティの門番)	Yoshihiro Mori	Natsuko Takahashi	February 25, 2006
22	"Finally Here! X City"; Transliteration: "Yatta ze tōchaku! X shiti" (Japanese: やったぜ到着！Xシティ)	Kazunobu Fuseki	Fumihiko Shimo	March 4, 2006
23	"The Idaten Battle Tournament Begins!"; Transliteration: "Idaten batoru tōnamento kaimaku!" (Japanese: 韋駄天バトルトーナメント開幕！)	Daisuke Takashima	Fumiyo Sakai	March 11, 2006
24	"Clash! Flame Kaiser VS Neptune"; Transliteration: "Gekitotsu! Fureimu Kaizā VS. Nepuchūn" (Japanese: 激突！フレイムカイザーVS.ネプチューン)	Hajime Tanaka	Kiyoko Yoshimura	March 18, 2006
25	"Hammerhead! Sixth Idaten Motorbike!"; Transliteration: "Hanmāheddo! 6-Dai-me no idaten baiku" (Japanese: ハンマーヘッド！6台目の韋駄天バイク)	Shunsuke Tada	Fumihiko Shimo	March 25, 2006
26	"Knockout! The Shidou Special"; Transliteration: "Hissatsu! Shidō supesharu" (Japanese: 必殺！ 獅堂スペシャル)	Kenichi Matsuzawa	Kōji Miura	April 1, 2006
27	"Fierce Fighting! Hammerhead vs. Aero Scissors"; Transliteration: "Gekitō! Hanmāheddo VS. Earo Shizāsu" (Japanese: 激闘！ハンマーヘッドVS. エアロシザース)	Yoshihiro Mori	Shinzō Fujita	April 8, 2006
28	"Conspiracy Finals"; Transliteration: "Inbō no kesshōsen" (Japanese: 陰謀の決勝戦)	Daisuke Takashima	Natsuko Takahashi	April 15, 2006
29	"Final Battle! Who Will Be the Winner?"; Transliteration: "Fainaru batoru! Yūshō wa dare no te ni?" (Japanese: ファイナルバトル！優勝は誰の手に？)	Hajime Tanaka	Kiyoko Yoshimura	April 22, 2006
30	"Enter! X-Tower"; Transliteration: "Totsunyū! X tawā" (Japanese: 突入！ Xタワー)	Kenichi Matsuzawa	Kiyoko Yoshimura	April 29, 2006
31	"Final Showdown! Flame Kaiser VS Bloody Fang"; Transliteration: "Saishū kessen! Fureimu Kaizā VS Buraddi Fangu" (Japanese: 最終決戦！フレイムカイザーVSブラッディファング)	Yoshihiro Mori	Fumihiko Shimo	May 6, 2006
32	"Farewell, X-Zone"; Transliteration: "Sayonara X zōn" (Japanese: さよならXゾーン)	Daisuke Takashima	Fumihiko Shimo	May 13, 2006
33	"A New Strong Enemy, Team X"; Transliteration: "Aratanaru kyōteki, sono na wa Chīmu X" (Japanese: 新たなる強敵、その名はチームX)	Shunsuke Tada	Fumihiko Shimo	May 20, 2006
34	"Back to the X-Zone!"; Transliteration: "Futatabi X zōn e!" (Japanese: 再びXゾーンへ！)	Yasutaka Yamamoto	Kōji Miura	May 27, 2006
35	"Shocker! Shou's Father Still Alive"; Transliteration: "Shōgeki! Ikiteita Shō no chichi" (Japanese: 衝撃！生きていた翔の父)	Daisuke Takashima	Fumiyo Sakai	June 3, 2006
36	"Roaring! Imperial DG!"; Transliteration: "Bakusō! Inperiaru DG!!" (Japanese: 爆走！インペリアルDG！！)	Yoshihiro Mori	Shinzō Fujita	June 10, 2006
37	"The Terrifying Dark Emblem"; Transliteration: "Kyōfu no dāku enburemu" (Japanese: 恐怖のダークエンブレム)	Jun Takahashi	Fumiyo Sakai	June 17, 2006
38	"Gabu's Temptation, Flame Kaiser in Big Trouble!"; Transliteration: "Gabu no yūwaku, Fureimu Kaizā dai pinchi!" (Japanese: 牙舞の誘惑、フレイムカイザー大ピンチ！)	Takashi Andō	Kiyoko Yoshimura	June 24, 2006
39	"Incandescence! Imperial DG VS Aero Scissors"; Transliteration: "Hakunetsu! Inperiaru DG VS. Earo Shizāsu" (Japanese: 白熱！インペリアルDG VS. エアロシザース)	Hajime Tanaka	Kōji Miura	July 1, 2006
40	"Bad Bacteria in the Nanashi Forest"; Transliteration: "Nanashi no mori no akudamakin" (Japanese: ナナシの森の悪玉菌)	Daisuke Takashima	Natsuko Takahashi	July 8, 2006
41	"Arthur's Challenge! The Road to the Phantom Island"; Transliteration: "Āsā no chōsen! Maboroshi no shima e no michi" (Japanese: アーサーの挑戦！幻の島への道)	Shunsuke Tada	Kiyoko Yoshimura	July 15, 2006
42	"Idaten Biker Gathering! The Decisive Battle Against Team X!"; Transliteration: "Idaten baiku daishūgō! Chīmu X to no kessen!" (Japanese: 韋駄天バイク大集合！チームXとの決戦！)	Yoshihiro Mori	Shinzō Fujita	July 22, 2006
43	"Shou VS Shidou! Battle For the Soul!"; Transliteration: "Shō VS. Shidō! Tamashī o kaketa batoru!" (Japanese: 翔VS.獅堂！魂を賭けたバトル！)	Yoshimichi Hirai	Fumiyo Sakai	July 29, 2006
44	"Shocking Reunion! Imperial X Appears!"; Transliteration: "Shōgeki no saikai! Inperiaru X shutsugen!" (Japanese: 衝撃の再会！インペリアルX出現！)	Hajime Tanaka	Fumihiko Shimo	August 5, 2006
45	"The Second Island Appears! The Beginning of World Collapse"; Transliteration: "Daini no shima arawaru! Sekai hōkai no hajimari" (Japanese: 第二の島現る！世界崩壊の始まり)	Yasutaka Yamamoto	Kōji Miura	August 12, 2006
46	"The Great Assault! Team X VS Imperial DG"; Transliteration: "Daishūgeki! Chīmu X VS. Inperiaru DG" (Japanese: 大襲撃！ チームX VS. インペリアルDG)	Jun Takahashi	Natsuko Takahashi	August 19, 2006
47	"Legendary Training Ground, Shou's Special Training!"; Transliteration: "Densetsu no renshūba, Shō no tokkun!" (Japanese: 伝説の練習場、翔の特訓！)	Daisuke Takashima	Kiyoko Yoshimura	August 26, 2006
48	"Miraculous Power! New Special Moves Burst Forth"; Transliteration: "Kiseki no chikara! Shin hissatsuwaza sakuretsu" (Japanese: 奇跡の力！新必殺技炸裂)	Kenichi Matsuzawa	Shinzō Fujita	September 2, 2006
49	"Flame Kaiser vs. Team Idaten Rider"; Transliteration: "Fureimu Kaizā VS. Chīmu Idaten Raidā" (Japanese: フレイムカイザーVS.チーム韋駄天ライダー)	Yoshihiro Mori	Kōji Miura	September 9, 2006
50	"Decisive Battle! Imperial Island!"; Transliteration: "Kessen! Inperiaru Airando!" (Japanese: 決戦！インペリアルアイランド！)	Yasutaka Yamamoto	Fumihiko Shimo	September 16, 2006
51	"Fateful Confrontation, Shou Yamato's Last Battle!"; Transliteration: "Unmei no taiketsu, Yamato Shō saigo no batoru!" (Japanese: 運命の対決、山登翔 最後のバトル！)	Takashi Andō	Fumihiko Shimo	September 23, 2006
52	"A New Journey, the World Revives!"; Transliteration: "Atarashī tabidachi, sekai yo yomigaere!" (Japanese: 新しい旅立ち、世界よ甦れ！)	Jun Takahashi	Fumihiko Shimo	September 30, 2006

== Video game ==
A video game adaptation called Idaten Jump DS: Moero! Flame Kaiser (韋駄天翔DS 燃えろ! フレイムカイザー) was published by Taito for the Nintendo DS in 2006.
