= Naoko Hayashiba =

Japanese shogi player and manga writer

- 林葉直子
- Born: January 24, 1968 (age 58)
- Other name: Masaru Katori (かとり まさる)
- Occupations: Shogi player, writer, manga artist

Naoko Hayashiba (林葉 直子, Hayashiba Naoko; born on January 24, 1968), also known by her pen name Masaru Katori (かとり まさる, Katori Masaru), is a writer, manga artist and former women's professional shogi player who won several women's professional titles during her career. She has written two novel series, Tondemo Police and Kiss Dakeja Iya, and the manga Shion no Ō.

== Early life ==
Hayashiba was born on January 24, 1968, and is from Fukuoka. She won the Women's Amateur Meijin tournament in 1979 when she was 11 years old.

== Women's shogi professional ==
Hayashiba defeated professional shogi player Kinji Shiihashi in a 1991 Ginga Tournament game using the rare Sleeve Rook opening as Black, which made her the first female professional to defeat a male in a tournament game. Her victory, however, is considered to be an "unofficial" because the Ginga Tournament did not become an official tournament until 2000.

She had the record for the highest yearly winning rate of 0.852 (23 wins out of 27) in 1989 until it was surpassed by Ichiyo Shimizu in 1993 (0.897) and the record winning streak of 17 games in a row in 1982 until it was beaten by Hiroe Nakai in 2010 (19 games) and Kana Satomi in 2015 (21 games).

Hayashiba quit professional shogi due to a sex scandal with another professional player, Makoto Nakahara, in 1995. In 2010, however, she returned to shogi after a 15-year absence, but retired yet again shorty thereafter.

=== Titles and other championships ===
Hayashiba won a total of 15 titles in her career. She won the Women's Meijin title 4 times, the Women's Ōshō title 10 times, and the Kurashiki Tōka Cup 1 time. When she was 15 years old, she became the youngest to win the Women's Meijin and the first as well as youngest to win two titles (2 crowns) at the same time.

Since she won the Women's Ōshō title more than 5 times, she was the first to qualify for the Lifetime Women's Ōshō (Queen Ōshō) title in 1985. However, since she left the JSA instead of retiring via normal channels, she was not given the title.

She won the Ladies Open Tournament once in 1989.

=== Awards and honors ===
Hayashiba has received a number of Japan Shogi Association Annual Shogi Awards in recognition of her accomplishments in shogi.

==== Annual shogi awards ====
- 10th Annual Awards (April 1982 – March 1983): Women's Professional Award
- 11th Annual Awards (April 1983 – March 1984): Women's Professional Award
- 12th Annual Awards (April 1984 – March 1985): Women's Professional Award
- 14th Annual Awards (April 1986 – March 1987): Women's Professional Award
- 17th Annual Awards (April 1989 – March 1990): Women's Professional Award
- 18th Annual Awards (April 1980 – March 1991): Women's Professional Award
