= Risa Mizuno =

Japanese voice actress

- 水野 理紗
- Born: 3 November 1978 (age 47); Kanagawa Prefecture, Japan
- Other name: Aki Mizuki
- Occupation: Voice actress
- Years active: 2000–present
- Agent: OgiPro The Next
- Notable work: AM Driver as Sera May; Bakugan Battle Brawlers as Julie Makimoto; Bomberman Jetters as Shout; Code-E as Yuma Saihashi; Gunslinger Girl: Il Teatrino as Claes; Idaten Jump as Yūki; Le Chevalier D'Eon as Lia de Beaumont; Luck & Logic as Veronica Ananko; Shion no Ō as Saori Nikaidō; Windy Tales as Yukio

Risa Mizuno (水野理紗, Mizuno Risa; born 3 November 1978) is a Japanese voice actress affiliated with OgiPro The Next. She debuted in 2000 in Medabots Spitits and has voiced major characters in Bomberman Jetters, Gunslinger Girl: Il Teatrino, Akame ga Kill!, Windy Tales, Le Chevalier D'Eon, Code-E, Shion no Ō, Bakugan Battle Brawlers, and Luck & Logic, as well as supporting characters in AM Driver and Idaten Jump. She is also a stage actress affiliated with Shonan Teatro Dell'arte and a screenwriter under the name Aki Mizuki (水月秋, Mizuki Aki).

== Biography ==
Risa Mizuno was born in Kanagawa Prefecture on 3 November 1978. Her mother was an English-language teacher. She discovered her voice talent during elementary school, and entered a specialized class during vocational school.

Her debut was in the 2000 anime Medabots Spirits. She subsequently starred as Shout in Bomberman Jetters, Yukio in Windy Tales, Lia de Beaumont in Le Chevalier D'Eon, Yuma Saihashi in Code-E, Saori Nikaidō in Shion no Ō, Claes in Gunslinger Girl: Il Teatrino, Julie Makimoto in Bakugan Battle Brawlers, Najenda in Akame ga Kill!, Veronica Ananko in Luck & Logic, and Ōinin in Aguu: Tensai Ningyō.

She also voiced Sera May in AM Driver, Yukie Akasaka in Higurashi When They Cry, Yuki in Idaten Jump, Wakana Nura in Nura: Rise of the Yokai Clan and its sequel Demon Capital, and Haruka Takahashi in Onegai My Melody and its sequel Kuru Kuru Shuffle. A character single for her AM Driver character alongside myco was released from Konami Digital Entertainment on 8 December 2004.

In October 2018, she participated alongside Kenji Mizuhashi and Satomi Hanamura in Makoto Shinkai Sakuhim Audiobook Project, which was released on Audible.

As of November 2014, Mizuno was living in Hiratsuka, where she was a member of Shōnan Teatro Dell'arte.

== Filmography ==
=== Anime ===
2000

- Medabots Spirits, Nae Akihabara
- Yu-Gi-Oh! GX, Cindia

2001

- Ask Dr. Rin!, Taeko
- Vampiyan Kids, Kana

2002

- Bomberman Jetters, Shout

2003

- Gunslinger Girl, Elenora Gabrielli
- Twin Spica, Yūko Suzunari

2004

- Kurau Phantom Memory, Midori Nonaka
- Kyo Kara Maoh!, Julia
- Shura no Toki – Age of Chaos, Kanae
- Windy Tales, Yukio

2005

- Absolute Boy, Asako Tōdō
- Kyo Kara Maoh! Season 2, Julia
- Onegai My Melody, Haruka Takahashi
- Sugar Sugar Rune, Ayano Ichijō

2006

- Akubi Girl, mother
- Artificial insect KABUTO BORG Victory by Victory, Nayo Makumo
- BakéGyamon, Uta
- D.Gray-man, fan, Jamie Dark
- Higurashi When They Cry, Yukie Akasaka
- Le Chevalier D'Eon, Lia de Beaumont
- Onegai My Melody ~Kuru Kuru Shuffle~, Haruka Takahashi
- Reborn!, Oregano

2007

- Bakugan Battle Brawlers, Julie Makimoto
- Code-E, Yuma Saihashi
- Dragonaut: The Resonance, Sherry fw
- Higurashi When They Cry Kai, counselor, child, male student
- Rental Magica, Diana
- Shion no Ō, Saori Nikaidō
- Sisters of Wellber, Iona

2008

- Gunslinger Girl -Il Teatrino-: Claes
- Kyo Kara Maoh! Season 3, Julia
- Monochrome Factor, Kiyomi Sonobe
- Nabari no Ou, Shigure
- The Tower of Druaga: The Aegis of Uruk, Etana
- Vampire Knight, Seiren, Sayori Wakaba
- Vampire Knight: Guilty, Seiren
- Yu-Gi-Oh! 5D's, Maria

2009

- Astro Fighter Sunred, Sachi
- Cooking Idol: Ai! Mai! Main!, Wakako
- Nyan Koi!, Cabaneko
- The Beast Player, Je
- The Tower of Druaga, Etana

2010

- Bakugan Battle Brawlers New Vestrola, Julie Makimoto, Buron
- Gokujō!! Mecha Mote Iinchō, Yurina Hoshizaki
- Nura: Rise of the Yokai Clan, Wakana Nura

2011

- Bakugan Battle Brawlers: Gundalian Invaders, Julie Makimoto
- Nura: Rise of the Yokai Clan: Demon Capital, Wakana Nura

2012

- Ginga e Kickoff!!, female athlete
- Sengoku Collection, Matsuura-sensei

2013

- Hakkenden: Eight Dogs of the East Season 2, Kayoko Kaburagi

2014

- Akame ga Kill!, Najenda
- Mushishi, mother

2015

- Go! Princess PreCure, Reiko Kisaragi
- The Disappearance of Nagato Yuki-chan, female doctor

2016

- Colorful Ninja Iromaki, mother
- Luck & Logic, Veronica Ananko
- Natsume's Book of Friends, Mino

2017

- Hina Logi: from Luck & Logic, Veronica Ananko

2018

- Aguu: Tensai Ningyō, Ōinin

=== OVA ===
2007

- Higurashi When They Cry: Nekogoroshihen, boy

2008

- Gunslinger Girl -Il Teatrino-: Claes

2009

- Higurashi no Naku Koro ni Rei, classmate (file.02 and file.03)

=== Film ===
2004

- The Place Promised in Our Early Days, Maki Kasahara

2007

- 5 Centimeters per Second, Kanae's elder sister

2011

- Children Who Chase Lost Voices, Ikeda-sensei

=== Video games ===
2003

- DreamMix TV World Fighters, Haruna

2004

- The Prince of Tennis RUSH & DREAM!, Nanako

2007

- Higurashi no Naku Koro ni Matsuri, Yukie Akasaka

2008

- Shion no Ō: The Flowers of Hard Blood., Saori Nikaidō

2009

- Yu-Gi-Oh! 5D's: Tag Force 4, generic character

2010

- Yu-Gi-Oh! 5D's: Tag Force 5, generic character

2011

- Yu-Gi-Oh! 5D's: Tag Force 6, generic character

2018

- Disaster Report 4 Plus: Summer Memories: Yuko Ichikawa

=== CD ===
- Calling You, schoolgirl
