= List of Kengan Ashura episodes =

Kengan Ashura is a Japanese anime series based on the manga series of the same name written by Yabako Sandrovich and illustrated by Daromeon. In January 2015, Ura Sunday opened a fan poll to let fans decide which of their series should receive an anime adaptation, and in May 2015, it was announced that Kengan Ashura had won the poll with 2.3 million out of 9 million total votes. Two years later, on December 7, 2017, it was announced that the anime was still being planned, with the 23rd volume revealing on December 12, 2017, that the anime would be a television series. The staff and release window for the series were announced on March 22, 2018. The series was directed by Seiji Kishi and written by Makoto Uezu, with animation by Larx Entertainment. Kazuaki Morita provided character designs for the anime, while Yasuharu Takanashi composed the series' music. The world premiere of the series took place at Anime Expo on July 7, 2018. The series premiered in Japan at Toho Cinemas Roppongi Hills on January 27, 2019. The series premiered on July 31, 2019. The opening theme is "King & Ashley" by My First Story, while the ending theme is "Born This Way" by BAD HOP. Netflix streamed the anime. The second part of the series, also consisting of 12 episodes, premiered on Netflix on October 31, 2019.

On March 24, 2022, it was announced that the anime is receiving a sequel. The editor of Kengan Omega manga has confirmed on Twitter that the anime continuation will adapt the original manga's story "until the end of the original (the end of the tournament)!". It was later revealed to be the first part of the second season that premiered on September 21, 2023. The opening theme is "Red" performed by SiM, while the ending theme is "Shambles" performed by Band-Maid. The second part premiered on August 15, 2024. For the second part, Hey-Smith performed the opening theme "Feel My Pain", while Jin Dogg performed the ending theme song "Nani?!".

== Series overview ==
Season	Episodes		Originally released
1	24	12	July 31, 2019
1	24	12	October 31, 2019
2	28	12	September 21, 2023
2	28	16	August 15, 2024

== Episode list ==
=== Season 1 (2019) ===
No. overall	No. in season	Title	Original release date
Part 1
1	1	"Kengan"; Transliteration: "Kengan" (Japanese: 拳願)	July 31, 2019
While walking down a street one day, Yamashita Kazuo notices a fight between Ohma and Komada Shigeru in a side alley. Yamashita expects Komada, being significantly larger than Tokita, to utterly defeat Tokita, but Tokita is so fast that he effortlessly dodges all of Komada's attacks. When Komada goads Tokita into attacking directly, he easily batters Komada and dislocates his shoulder when Komada attempts to retaliate, finishing Komada off with several kicks to the face. In awe, Yamashita asks Tokita's name, but when Tokita asks after Yamashita's name and offers to fight, Yamashita gives his name but declines. Riled up by the encounter, Yamashita quickly heads to a brothel to release his pent up energy, something he does not normally do. The fight made him feel alive, and when he is once again scolded by his boss at Yogi Publications for being below quota, he wishes he could fight like Tokita in order to be treated with respect. They are interrupted by the arrival of the President however, who asks after Yamashita specifically, and he is brought to the Chairman, Nogi Hideki. There, Nogi queries Yamashita on conflict resolution, before launching into an explanation of Kengan Association's history of using violence to do so, eventually resulting in one-on-one matches. Yamashita, although initially disbelieving, is assigned by Nogi to be Tokita's "caretaker", or manager, who Nogi just recently hired to replace their former fighter, Komada. On the street, Yamashita sheepishly attempts to dissuade Tokita from fighting, considering its illegality, but Tokita just asks to get food instead. At his home, Yamashita monologues about his situation in life. He is 56 years old and has worked with Nogi Publications for 34 years, but his oldest son Yamashita Kenzo is 25 and never leaves his room, Yamashita not having seen his face in two or three years, and his other son is a high school dropout who returns only to steal money. His wife abandoned him ten years ago, and the house he owns still has 15 years left to pay. Arriving at the dilapidated, abandoned mansion in the woods where Tokita lives, Yamashita is shocked to find him covered in blood. In actuality it was from a boar that Tokita had killed, cooking it for food. While eating, two strangers enter the mansion, one being Ivan Karaev, a Russian who challenges Tokita to fight.
2	2	"Super Human"; Transliteration: "Chōjin" (Japanese: 超人)	July 31, 2019
Ivan Karaev, a famous Russian kickboxer, fights Tokita Ohma. As Ivan goes for a high kick, Tokita dodges and kicks Ivan in his exposed groin, downing him. His companion moves forward and kills Ivan with his fingertips by opening an artery. He then introduces himself as Lihito, Tokita's opponent in the next Kengan match. At the match Yoshitake Yoshiro is first encountered, President of Yoshitake Real Estate and Lihito's sponsor. Akiyama Kaede explains to Yamashita Kazuo that the wager of the fight is construction rights to a planned 100 billion Yen tower. Nogi Hideki also explains to Yamashita that the people in attendance are representatives of companies in the Kengan Association, there to report the results and bet on the fight. The crowd is initially upset that Komada Shigeru is not present, wanting a serious fight, and Kaede questions Nogi's choice of Tokita as a fighter, considering he did not forewarn him about Lihito's skills. Nogi simply responds that if Tokita cannot win here, he will not be needed anymore. Tokita and Lihito warm up in the ring, rain pouring on their heads, and the fight begins. Neither combatant moves however, continuing to stare at each other, shifting their weight and balance while looking for an opening as the crowd complains at the lack of action. Suddenly, they both move, Tokita landing the first punch but Lihito resisting the blow by pressing his head forward, robbing it of power. Tokita eventually gains the upper hand, then takes Lihito to the ground, but then Lihito slices Tokita's arm and chest with his fingernails, specializing in his "Razer's Edge" ability due to his preternatural pinching strength, and gets back into the fight. The fight resumes, and Lihito scores several slices on Tokita, Tokita nonetheless remaining calm despite increasing blood loss. Lihito presses the advantage, and Tokita lands a stunning kick to Lihito, knocking him to the ground again, but this time Tokita does not advance. Lihito mocks him, saying he grabbed Tokita's leg as he kicked, and sliced him again. Lihito eventually reveals that he does not consider himself human, instead a "superhuman" due to his inborn grip strength, and for fighting so well, Lihito tells Tokita his real name; Ichiro Nakata, having taken a pseudonym as "super heroes" do in fiction. As Lihito continues to boast, Tokita mocks him, saying real heroes are of few words. He claims to have found a counter to Lihito, only being cautious in case of additional trickery, using the conversation as an opportunity to close in on him as Lihito becomes unnerved. Yoshitake Yoshiro screams to take the finishing blow, and as Lihito strikes, Tokita blocks it with an open-handed grip, having prevented Lihito from gaining acceleration enough to properly cut. Pressing the advantage, Tokita disrupts Lihito's flow of power and once again sends him to the ground, this time finishing with a foot to the face, winning. Only a select few veteran onlookers understood precisely what had happened. Rights to the Makunouchi Building now secured by the Nogi Group, Tokita, Yamashita and Kaede celebrate with food. Kaede asks Tokita why he fights in the matches, as the money is not really worth the pain and potential death. His explanation is that he wants to establish who's strongest, any other reason being "tacked on afterwards". Kaede questions why that would be enough reasoning considering that he might die if he loses, to which he responds that there is simply no possibility of that happening, although Tokita thinks internally that he seeks to defeat an old acquaintance, Kiryu Setsuna. At the Kouou Women's University, where Kengan Association member Kouou Education Group resides, Kiryu has defeated all of their members in an attempt to enter the Kengan matches in order to confront Tokita. Soryuin Shion, chairwoman of Kouou, accepts him as a fighter. Meanwhile, Nogi arranges another fight against a 57-streak winner, as one final test.
3	3	"Tough Guy"; Transliteration: "Kyōsha" (Japanese: 強者)	July 31, 2019
Tokita prepares to fight GANDAI competitor Sekibayashi Jun, a large man, in an underground parking lot. Tokita begins fighting immediately despite Sekibayashi wanting to talk, but Tokita's blows have little effect due to Sekibayashi's massive size. Sekibayashi eventually lands a devastating kick, sending Tokita into a car, before monologuing about how Tokita has the option to run or to dodge, whereas he has a duty to fight head on as a professional wrestler. He calls Tokita a peasant, and then Tokita retaliates in earnest, seeming to gain the upper hand, until Sekibayashi calls it an act, and slams Tokita to the ground. Sekibayashi continues to pummel the unconscious Tokita, but when an onlooker says he has lost, Yamashita Kazuo grabs his shirt and demands he take it back, yelling that Tokita simply cannot lose, but the onlooker is unmoved. As Sekibayashi is about to break Tokita, he finds himself in a room lit with candles, and blows them out. He suddenly awakes, having broken Sekibayashi's fingers, and jumps aside, seemingly possessed. He begins fighting beyond his usual style, keeping up a continuous flurry of blows that Sekibayashi continues to absorb even as he advances. Sekibayashi tries to grab Tokita, but he dodges and parries with a kick, sending Sekibayashi staggering backward. Tokita continues to devastate Sekibayashi as two newcomers, Wakatsuki Takeshi and Imai Cosmo, comment on Tokita's increase in rotational power, but Sekibayashi simply comes back, staggering Tokita with two massive blows, until Tokita lunges forward to meet Sekibayashi's oncoming rush, striking him in the windpipe and defeating Sekibayashi. At the end of the match, the onlooker offers to have a drink with Yamashita, while Chairman Katahara Metsudo, director of Dainippon Bank, arrives, impressed by the results. Shikano then agrees to motion for a replacement of the Chairman's post, and having reached 50, Metsudo declares an Kengan Annihilation Tournament.
4	4	"Reunited"; Transliteration: "Saikai" (Japanese: 再会)	July 31, 2019
Tokita Ohma strangles Nogi Hideki due to his decision not to have Tokita fight for the company in the upcoming Kengan Annihilation Tournament. Hatsumi Sen arrives, here to replace Tokita, and stops Tokita from strangling Nogi, saying that he is too injured to enter a tournament and effortlessly dodging all of Tokita's futile attacks. Nogi cuts in, saying that while Tokita cannot fight for Nogi, he has no issue with finding his own way into the tournament. He gives Yamashita Kazuo a loan of 100 million yen to enter Tokita into unofficial matches so that Yamashita can become an employee of the Kengan Association, allowing Tokita to compete in the tournament. Yamashita attempts to back out but is coerced by Tokita into accepting. Nabe Misao is set to be the opposing company, with his fighter Yokota Masayasu. Nabe typically wagers his Kengan Association membership against raw cash in order to make tidy sums. In an underground aqueduct, the Yokota and Tokita prepare to fight, and Tokita defeats Yokota in a single punch. Yamashita then becomes a Kengan Association member, and his son Yamashita Kenzo becomes aware of it. Ohta Masahiko is called by Kenzo, the leader of their corporation, and informs him that they shall be entering a fighter in the Annihilation Tournament from the Kure Family. Ohya Ken also asks Yamashita Kazuo out for a drink and tells him of the 500 billion yen entry fee for the tournament, in which he is also participating as CEO of Ginokuniya Bookstore, his fighter being Himuro Ryo. Tokita, now fully recovered and training, reminisces to the time where Tokita Niko, his master and adoptive father, was killed by Taira Genzan. Suddenly, Genzan's apprentice Kiryu Setsuna appears above Tokita, saying that he himself killed Genzan and that Tokita should take his revenge out on him instead. Tokita rebukes him, calling him a pervert and saying that he only sought Genzan to prove he was better than Niko, and that crushing Kiryu in the tournament will do just as well, which excites Kiryu.
5	5	"Brawl"; Transliteration: "Ransen" (Japanese: 乱戦)	July 31, 2019
Matsui Hiroshi of Nogi Publications, is furious that Yamashita Kazuo is taking 10 days of paid vacation followed by a request for annual leave. At his home, Yamashita has left spending money for his son Yamashita Kenzo, the secret president of Under Mount Inc., and talks to him through his door, saying he is leaving for a 10 day business trip. Arriving at the boats to the Kengan Annihilation Tournament, Yamashita and many others are sent to a frigate rather than the luxury cruise ship, there for the preliminary "battle royale" fight in order to enter the main tournament. However, when Akiyama Kaede brings Tokita Ohma some water, the gate closes behind her and she becomes trapped in the battle royale area. As she was waylaid by a question from Tokita, she insists he defend her until Lihito arrives. Lihito has much improved his Razor's Edge, easily dispatching a fighter along the way without having to build up momentum, and when he notices Kaede he decides to defend her too. Although Tokita wants to just fight Lihito, and Lihito wants revenge from their last fight, he instead decides to fight with Tokita so that they can both make it to the main tournament and fight each other there. Together they both defend Kaede and successfully stave off the horde of contenders. Their attention is drawn to Jerry Tyson however, as he cleaves his way through contenders. Having learned to imitate bullets and rockets, the Detroit native fighter rushes along at high speeds and knocks them aside, although Tokita continuously dodges his rushes. Tokita eventually redirects Jerry into a wall, but he just pushes off of it to return even faster. However, this places him in trajectory to hit Kaede and so he tries to stop himself. Before impact, Tokita uses an ability from the Niko Style called Adamantine Kata, that he learned from Tokita Niko, to tighten all of his muscles to block any impact and deflect Jerry away. Jerry attacks again, and again Tokita blocks him, sending him sprawling to the ground in defeat. The resulting fight leaving only five contenders, all of which to go on to the main tournament which are Tokita and Lihito, the queer fighter Keizaburo Sawada, fisherman Karo Yoshinari, and Arabian fighter Hassad. Afterward, Yamashita is distraught that he didn't make a bet, as all the people he thought would win did end up winning, and he could have paid off his debt had he gambled. From the main ship, Kiryu Setsuna watches in glee from his binoculars, glad that Tokita has survived so that they can fight each other. Katahara then congratulates the five victors to the main tournament when Hassad demands to know why they were placed in preliminaries. Angered at being called a pawn on a board, Hassad tries to attack Katahara but is launched off of the ship by his bodyguard Yodoe, landing in the water and being disqualified from the tournament.
6	6	"Pulling Strings"; Transliteration: "An'yaku" (Japanese: 暗躍)	July 31, 2019
Finally arriving on the luxury cruise ship, Yamashita Kazuo is bittersweet over his childhood dream of attending such a fancy event due to the sheer amount of debt he incurred to get there. Nogi Hideki arrives with Hatsumi Sen to congratulate Tokita Ohma on his victory, but Tokita rebuffs Nogi, saying he doesn't need him anymore, as he earned his own way into the tournament. At the same time, Lihito is seen harassing Akiyama Kaede for her phone number, who struggles to dissuade Lihito and send him back to his employer. Lihito then replies that he is his employer, being the President of his own SF Cold Storage corporation that he also serves as a fighter. At this point it is revealed that Nogi set up several subsidiary corporations, much like Yamashita Trading Company. In their subsidiary contracts are requirements that, should their fighter win in a Kengan Annihilation Tournament, that company will be required to select Nogi as the new Kengan Association Chairman. As Yamashita walks around, he notices several people huddled around Kaneda Suekichi, a Japanese chess player gambling with 10,000-yen entry fees and 100,000-yen returns should anyone defeat him. Ohya Ken asks Yamashita to try, as he also lost to Kaneda, and Yamashita ends up losing five times in a row. Chiba Takayuki looks in on the chess games, but before he can try himself, Kengan Association Chairman Katahara Metsudo arrives. He announces that in 27 hours they shall arrive at the battlefield and commence the "competitor registration", officially entering them into the Kengan Annihilation Tournament, however by rule no competitors may fight each other on the cruise ship. Soryuin Shion, chairwoman of Kouou, talks with Nogi regarding the rule. They both agree that there are many ambitious people on board who may break said rule, but when Tokita notices their conversation, she heads over to him. She mentions her fighter Kiryu Setsuna having a keen interest in him, and Tokita grabs her collar to demand to know where Kiryu is. She takes the assertiveness as flattery until Lihito pulls Tokita off of her, and she tells Tokita to be thoroughly prepared if he wants to defeat Kiryu. Kiryu, meanwhile, is currently murdering Yodoe merely because Yodoe caused some of Hassad's blood to spatter on Tokita when he kicked him. In an ornate hallway on the boat, Kaneda Suekichi asks Ken to replace Himuro Ryo for him as the fighter for Ginokuniya Bookstore. Citing a loophole in Katahara's rule against competitors fighting, as a non-competitor Kaneda can fight Himuro for the position, thus becoming a competitor only after the fight is over, and therefore not breaking the rule. Himuro accepts the challenge, and although Kaneda makes polite reassurances of fair play, Himuro quickly punches him in the face mid-speech, offering to abrogate his position only if Kaneda can withstand one minute. The fight begins in earnest with Kaneda trying to analyze the fight but is again punched in the face while thinking. Kaneda staves him off long enough to identify Himuro's specific Jeet Kune Do fighting form and, knowing what to anticipate, has more success blocking his attacks until Himuro wears him down and knees him in the stomach. Kaneda collapses, seemingly defeated, until he pops back up and lands a blow on Himuro. Himuro rushes back in, but Kaneda blocks enough of his attacks until taking an opening to hit him yet again, sending him to his knees. Himuro rises and again goes in, now taking Kaneda completely seriously, and begins to regain the advantage. Just has he lands the final blow; Kaneda manages to get his arm into a lock and uses his momentum to twist and break his arm. Himuro doesn't quit however, and begins to fight one handed, but Kaneda quickly blocks each strike and then kicks him in his broken arm. Kaneda dodges a kick from Himuro, and Ken realizes that Kaneda is literally predicting Himuro's every move and beginning his dodges before they even begin, just as he did in chess. Himuro refuses to give up despite Kaneda's taunts to back down, and in one final rush from Himuro, Kaneda slips around him and sends his head smashing to the ground. Meekly, Himuro tries to reach out, but Kaneda finishes him with numerous stomping kicks to the face until he passes out. Ken, although shocked at how far Kaneda went, is nonetheless pleased to make Kaneda his new competitor. On an outside deck, Lihito shares a concern with Tokita that other non-competitors could abuse the loophole by attacking them at random, although Tokita is unconcerned. Wakatsuki Takeshi and Imai Cosmo however, talking in an engine room, are indeed targeted by unscrupulous non-competitors who seek to take their spots. Imai however is joyful at the challenge, having been utterly bored, and prepares to fight.
7	7	"The Night Before"; Transliteration: "Zen'ya" (Japanese: 前夜)	July 31, 2019
Several quick battles between the tournament fighters and fighters being led by Hayami Katsumasa, in an attempt to replace them to ensure his choice for chairman is the winner. After Kurayoshi Rino's fighter Mikazuchi Rei defeats his opponent, Hayami's fighter asks if he should take care of them. However, Hayami informs him they have 6 slots in the tournament already and will be fine. Kaede Akiyama scalds Rihito for losing all of his possessions to the casino, asking him what he would've done if she didn't bail him out. She also got on Tokita Ohma for being a womanizer. Shortly after a hooded fighter arrives and attacks Yamashita Kazuo. However, Tokita is able to get him out of the way in time. Rihito then tries to attack the fighter, but they effortlessly jump off of him and attacks Tokita. He goes for a punch, but they easily dodge it and attempts a grapple attack. Unfortunately, they're too light for the attack to be effective. While they're still grappled to Tokita's torso, Tokita goes in for a punch, stopping it just before it hits their face to knock their hood off. This reveals the hooded fighter was a young girl. She then introduces herself as Kure Karla and proposes to him and asks to have his baby. Everyone is greatly confused at the proposal, but none more so than Tokita who simply sits her down and runs away. Shortly after, Reichi and Hollis Kure arrives to retrieve Karla. Before she leaves, she asks for Tokita's name. Rihito says he is a "seaweed head", but Yamashita corrects him. Once she has returned to her grandfather and informs him of her crush, he informs his men to eliminate Tokita the next time he even gets close to Karla. The ship finally arrives at the destination, and they arrive in the room to draw their pairings for the tournament. Yamashita feels the dread of realizing he doesn't belong there and is surprised to see Ohya Ken working with Hayami. Nogi has a very series look on his face, which confuses Yamashita as he has never seen him like that before. Kurayoshi explains that if he loses the tournament his group will be required to disband, which worries Yamashita as he doesn't want his job to go bankrupt, though then remembers the 5-billion-yen debt which have forced to take on for the tournament would be forgiven. However, Kurayoshi then explains how impressed she is that he was willing to put up literally all of his possessions as collateral for the loan. The drawing for the lots is done by using a machine to create a 9-digit number by hitting the stop button for each position. Yamashita is told to go first as the newest member and rolls a 989,086,296. While the machine is spinning for him, he believes the numbers slowed down halfway through, allowing him to get his high number. Rihito rolled a 226. With Yamashita's roll, he was able to get first pick in bracket slots. He chooses slot number 8 at random. He then worries if it isn't a good choice. The episode closes with several fighters exclaiming their readiness for the tournament.
8	8	"The Battle Begins"; Transliteration: "Kaisen" (Japanese: 開戦)	July 31, 2019
A large crowd enters the Kengen tournament arena. Yamashita Kazuo is amazed at the energy of the crowd compared to a normal fighting match. Imai Cosmo is stretching, preparing for his match. He has a flashback to his youth, when he was a troublemaker. One day he was at a disadvantage in a fight against 4 yakuza members when a normal guy jumped in and knocked out the yakuza. He later learned he is Kureishi Mitsuyo, an MMA fighter. He was impressed with Cosmo and offered to teach him. After the flashback, Nishihonji Akira, Cosmo's coach, reminds him to just forfeit if the match becomes too dangerous. Cosmo reminds him he hates losing, so he will win. The fight then begins against Adam Dudley and Cosmo. Adam goes for a punch, but Cosmo dodges and gets in several hits, which Adam blocks. Cosmo is able to get a good kick in on Adam's legs and stomach. Adam then does several swings, but all of them miss. Adam decides to go for Cosmo's eyes, however Cosmo dodges that too and uses a scissor throw to get Adam onto the ground. Jerry Tyson, an eliminated fighter in the audience, thinks he recognizes Adam, but cannot place it. Cosmo gets on top of him and prepares to pin him, giving a victory speech when Adam smiles and tells him to wait for him to be unconscious first. Cosmo then lands a hard hit straight to Adams face. He then starts to do smaller hits as Adam blocks them with his arms. Despite all of Cosmo's hits, Adam still isn't revealing an opening. Adam then taunts Cosmo, which opens Cosmo's guard enough to throw a punch. By dodging the punch, Adam is no longer pinned to the ground. Despite the punch only grazing him, it caused Cosmo a lot of pain. Jerry Tyson finally remembers who Adam is. It is revealed Adam used to work in brawl prevention in ice hockey. Because of his abnormally large erector spinae muscle, Adam can knock people out with just a swing of his fist. Cosmo decides he has to beat him with his speed. Adam grabs Cosmo and slams him with a full body punch. The punch sent him flying and into the ground. As Cosmo was getting back up, Adam punch him again. Cosmo managed to jump to help minimize the damage taken. Cosmo manages to get more punches in but begins to worry about a battle of stamina. Cosmo lowers into a new, lower stance. This prompts Adam to adapt his stance as well as they decide the next move will be the one that decides the match. Cosmo uses Zone Activate and Adam uses High Stick Shot. Adam lands an incredibly powerful hit on Cosmo, smashing him into the ground. Adam picks him up again and lands another incredibly powerful blow. Once he is back on the ground, he continues hitting him in the head. The referee then interferes and stops the match. Adam tries to argue, but realizes he is mildly hallucinating. Adam then sees himself unconscious in a Triangle Choke. Cosmo is declared the winner of the match. Cosmo leaves the arena and is met by Nishihonji who offers him a rest and food but ends up catching Cosmo as he falls.
9	9	"Justice"; Transliteration: "Seigi" (Japanese: 正義)	July 31, 2019
In the Himalayas mountains, Haru lived. A few years later, Kono Akio from Japan arrived and invited Haru to come back with him to be a fighter for him. The Destroyer, Kono Haruo formerly Haru, who represents Nentendo vs The Executioner, Akoya Seishu, represents Wakasa Life Insurance's battle is announced. The match opens with Haruo launching for a hit, but Akoya dodging it. Haruo keeps attacking and dodges a hit with a backflip. He then moves in with a leap towards him and launches Akoya against a wall. Haruo goes in for another punch, but Akoya prepares his stance like a giant shield and deflects him. Akoya's fighting style is one of subduing their opponent. After a few more deflects, Haruo yells at him and goes in for another attack. During this attack, Akoya cuts Haruo's arm. This enrages Haruo and causes him to try to attack again, though Akoya then cuts his other arm. Haruo then attacks with his Bear Killer move, but Akoya deflects it with a Low Right Foot Edge Kick followed by a Low Left Punch to Haruo's stomach followed with a Right Palm Heel Punch to the face, then several punches to the chest. Haruo then grabs Akoya's robe and goes for a punch, but Akoya drops out of his robe and kicks Haruo's knee. There is then a cut-scene of villains terrorizing a car thief for stealing their boss's car. A vigilante comes in to save him, but then offers him a gun and tells him he can go free if he shoots him. Confused, the vigilante explains how the guy stole a car and performed a hit and run, which needs to be punished. The thief was about to shoot him, when the vigilante killed him. Akoya is leaving work, when Hiyama Shunka gives him a ride. Akoya explains he will serve justice until evil has been eradicated. When Haruo is threatened to be sent back to his village, he is reinvigorated and launches another attack on Akoya. However, Akoya blocks it and cuts deep into Haruo's arm. Once Haruo pulls away and launches another attack, Akoya hits Haruo's liver twice. After dodging several more of Haruo's attacks, he hits him with a Middle Right Round Kick to the stomach. Haruo shouts how he is the strongest in the Himalayas when Shunka announces it is time to finish him off. Akoya then kicks Haruo's knee in the same place as before and slams his face into his knee, knocking him unconscious. Just before the referee finishes declaring Akoya the winner, Haruo rises back up despite still being unconscious. He then launches a powerful attack, using a different breathing pattern than before, and continues to launch attacks on Akoya which are more powerful than before. The village elder explains how despite moving to Japan and getting caught up in a world of greed, the original Haru's fighting spirit still resides within him and refuses to lose. Akoya tries to kick the weakened knee again, but it has no effect and Haruo sends Akoya flying across the arena. Shunka asks Akoya to last a few more minutes so she can finish reanalyzing Haruo, but he warns her they don't have much time left. As the battle spirit pushes out the poison of greed, Haruo's speed continues to increase. Just before Akoya launches an attack on Haruo, Haruo's knee gives out causing him incredible pain. This gives Akoya an opening, and he kicks Haruo across the face. Akoya is declared the winner. After leaving the arena, Shunka apologizes for messing up the analysis and promises to get it right next time. Akoya slaps her and tells her he'll fight without her next time as she was just a hindrance. Shunka begs him to reconsider. He decides to give her one last chance.
10	10	"Sister"; Transliteration: "Kyōdai" (Japanese: 兄妹)	July 31, 2019
Kure Fusui is pointing a sniper rifle towards a window. Kure Henzo checks in on her and brings food. They discuss why it is Kure Raian representing the company and why they have to watch their own client, Yamashita Kenzo, who hasn't left his room in the four days they've been there. Ohta Masahiko panics by the arena as Raian hasn't arrived yet, despite his match being about to start. Rihito is using the urinal when Raian comes up behind him and starts messing with the self-proclaimed "Super Human". After some more provoking from Raian, Rihito challenges him to a fight. Raian arrives to his Kengan match covered in blood. Elena Robinson wishes for her brother, Mokichi Robinson to be safe in his battle. Raian, "The Taboo Descendant", representing Under Mount Inc versus Mokichi Robinson, "The Exterminating Vicar", representing Sentory. As soon as the referee starts the match Raian goes in for a powerful kick, but Mokichi catches his leg. At the same time, Raian catches a punch from Mokichi. They then separate and Raian goes on the offensive with several punches, which are deflected. Mokichi goes for a kick, which is also deflected. The pair then continues to trade blows, being fairly evenly matched. Members of the Kure family wonder why Raian is just playing around, but they explain that Mokichi isn't using his full power yet either. Raian leaps into another attack and throws some blood in Mokichi's eyes. While Mokichi is blinded, Raian goes in for a strong punch, but it is stopped. While Mokichi is holding Raian's hand, he twists his wrist, causing him intense pain. Mokichi then taunts Raian, threatening to break his fingers if he doesn't withdraw. Raian breaks out of the hold, and taunts Mokichi back. Raian grabs Mokichi's shirt and goes in for a headbutt. However, Mokichi counters with a short uppercut. This throws Raian off guard, as Mokichi is moving away from the classical martial arts he was using before into more modern boxing-esque techniques called Baritsu. Mokichi then lands a powerful kick against Raian's head. Mokichi then lands another powerful punch to Raian's face and chest, dodging all of Raian's attacks. Raian goes for a punch, but Mokichi grabs him and slams him onto the ground on his head. Mokichi walks away, thinking Raian has been defeated. To the surprise of everyone, Raian then gets back up and starts to use the Kure clan's secret technique Release. This causes him to turn a purplish color. Raian then goes in for an incredibly powerful punch which sends Mokichi flying. Mokichi is powerless against the onslaught of attacks Raian is doing. Raian throws Mokichi across the arena and engages him in a choke hold. Mokichi then has a flashback to his youth when his father was trying to teach him Baritsu. However, his father was incredibly tough on him, so he left home at 14 and got involved in the criminal underworld. After his father died, he was introduced to his half-sister Elena. Meeting her taught him the meaning of family and changed him into the man he is today. Being reinvigorated from the flashback, Mokichi is able to break out of the stranglehold. They both go in for another attack, with Raian landing a powerful knee to Mokichi's stomach. Elena begs for Moki to win. He goes in for a special Two Finger attack, but it is blocked by a punch to the face. Raian then grabs Mokichi by the neck and kills him and winning the match.
11	11	"Ashura"; Transliteration: "Shura" (Japanese: 修羅)	July 31, 2019
Tokita Ohma is trying on the new pair of shorts Yamashita Kazuo got him before the match. Yamashita asks Tokita to forfeit if his life is ever in danger, but Tokita assures him he will win and he wants meat at the victory dinner and leaves for the arena. The president of Penasonic, Urita Sukizo, stops Yamashita and offers him a bet as a way to test the caliber of man he is. He offers 10 Penasonic TVs and Yamashita bets the monetary value of those 10 TVs. Yamashita isn't too worried about it, as it would be drops in the bucket compared to the other debt he has taken on for the tournament. Akiyama Kaede then explains Urita was speaking in Kegen code words, meaning instead of offering 10 televisions, he was actually offering a 10% share of Penasonic. Using the current market price, if he loses, he'll have to pay 280 billion yen. Tokita Ohma, "The Ashura", representing Yamashita Corporation versus Inaba Ryo, "The Black Phantom", representing Penaonic Corporation Once the referee starts the match, the two engage with Ryo missing a jab and Tokita landing several bloody hits followed by a kick. Ryo tries to retaliate with a kick, but Tokita dodges. The two continue to exchange blows. Yamashita loudly proclaims in the crowd that Tokita is stronger and will easily finish Ryo after Tokita knocks him to the ground. Tokita runs towards him, but Inaba's movements change, and he begins circling Tokita leaving behind after images. Tokita tries to hit Inaba but is only hitting the after images. Inaba adopts a hit and run technique to get in reliable damage over time. Tokita starts making a clicking sound with his mouth. Inaba then goes in for another strike, but Tokita is able to land a heavy blow to his face, sending him flying. Tokita starts using the Niko style, making quick movements and leaving behind after images of his own. He instructs Inaba to move on to his next trick, as that won't work anymore, as he lands several hits on Inaba. Tokita then lands an incredibly powerful hit on Inaba's stomach, causing him to cough up blood. Tokita goes in for another kick, however he stops just short of Inaba's face because his hair is stopping Tokita's leg because of "Spider's Hair". Inaba tells Tokita it is time to go on the offensive, but Tokita disagrees and tries to rip Inaba's hair out. However, this is unsuccessful and Inaba sends him flying into the ground. Tokita uses the Adamantine Kata to help reduce the damage taken. While still on the ground, Inaba uses his hair like a whip and slashes Tokita's chest. Tokita tries to close the gap between then, but Inaba trips him by pulling on the hair wrapped around his ankle and slams him into the ground again and begins to whip him continuously. President Urita begins to believe Inaba has won, but notices Yamashita smiling in the crowd. He begins to worry about it, but in reality, he is just freaking out about all the debt he will be in if Tokita loses. Inaba wraps his hair around Tokita's eyes, neck and wrists. With this Tokita considers Inaba a worthy opponent. He then breaks free of Inaba's hair and lands a powerful punch, breaking one of Inaba's fingers. Then follows it up with a direct hit to the face. Continuing to hit him causing him to crack his skull and break his jaw from an uppercut. He then hits all of Inaba's major organs. Before passing out, Inaba tries for a final kick, but Tokita counters it with an uppercut. Then lands a power kick to the side of Inaba's head and then stomps on his face. Inaba then loses consciousness and loses. Yamashita Kenzo comments on Tokita winning and how now it will be their corporations battling in the next round. President Urita then comes along to deliver Yamashita's 10% share in Penaonic, but Tokita tells him to keep it as they aren't interested in it, much to Yamashita's dismay.
12	12	"Father and Son"; Transliteration: "Fushi" (Japanese: 父子)	July 31, 2019
In an operating theater, with Hanafusa Hajime finishing surgery on Mokichi Robinson. They were able to bring him back to life, much to their surprise. The battle between Murobuchi Gozo, "The Immeasurable", representing United Clothing and Wakatsuki Takeshi, "Wild Tiger" ended shortly after Takeshi send Gozo flying with a single punch, knocking him out. Yamashita Kazuo asks Tokita Ohma if he thinks he can beat him, but Tokita just walks off to get some food. The battle between Sawada Keizaburo, "The Bird of Darkness", representing Murder Music and Julius Reinhold, "The Monster", representing Toyo Electric Power Co ends before it begins due to Murder Music's forfeit. The Chairman, Katahara Metsudo, is pleased that people are finally taking advantage of the design of the tournament, as he wrote the rules carefully enough to allow for participants to act under the table. Togawa Yoshiko of Murder Music was being threatened by Nikaido Ren, a fighter for the Byakuya Shimbun Company and Meguro Masaki from Umiichi Securities, which caused her to forfeit the match before Sawada intervenes. He then challenges Reinhold and Ren to a fight for threatening Yoshiko, but Reinhold decides to attack him all by himself since he was his opponent in the match. Sawada performs a spinning kick, landing a heavy blow to his neck. Once the attack lands, Reinhold grabs Swada's leg and breaks his ankle before throws him against a wall. Reinhold is going in to break the other leg, when he is hit on the head with an empty can. Yamashita apologizes for throwing the can at him, since he missed the trash can. Ren tries to put Yamashita to sleep, but he bows at the perfect time so the thin needle misses. Hayami Katsumasa then instructs them all to leave the Yamashita Corporation alone and sends Masaki to the arena for his match. Yamashita and Tokita go to a bar together to get some food, when Yamashita thanks Tokita for introducing him to a new world. A news flash comes on the television, alerting them that Swada was attacked by surprise. Yamashita worries that Tokita might be attacked at any time, but Tokita isn't worried about it. Yamashita talks about how Tokita is like a son to him and mentions how he was a failure to his own son. Tokita doesn't appreciate this at all, and goes to the bathroom where he vomits blood into the sink. When the battle between Muteba Gizenga, "The Genocider", representing Iwami Heavy Industries and Meguro Masaki, "The Crying Man", representing Umiichi Securities starts, Masaki leaps on Muteba and throws him to the ground and mounts him. Muteba punches Masaki in an attempt to break the mount. Masaki then starts to strangle Muteba. Muteba then smashes one of Masaki's eyeballs, but he continues to be strangled. He then punctures Masaki's ear and warns him that he wasn't hired to kill, but he will do so if he has to. In response, Masaki gouges out both of Muteba's eyes for attacking one of his. Muteba then crushes Masaki's testicles, causing him to release the mount. It is revealed that Masaki feels pleasure from the pain he receives. He then walks over to Muteba to finish him off, when Muteba kicks his legs and breaks one of his arms. It is also revealed that Muteba was already blind, so he didn't lose anything from Masaki gouging out his eyeballs. Masaki goes in for a charge, but Muteba kicks him in the head. Masaki then grabs his leg and tries to slam him into the ground, but he counters by kicking his head. This causes him to release his leg, and he performs a jab on Masaki's throat causing incredible blood loss. Masaki then charges in for another attack, when Muteba grabs his head and breaks his neck and finishes with a blow through his broken eye and into his brain. Masaki then has a flashback to his youth, when he killed an older disciple of his master. His father accepts that his son was never human, merely a monster in human form before he is killed by his son. Masaki then falls to the ground with a big smile as Muteba is declared the winner of the match. The episode ends with Hajime revealing Tokita doesn't have much time left.
Part 2
13	13	"Convictions"; Transliteration: "Shin'nen" (Japanese: 信念)	October 31, 2019
14	14	"Master and Pupil"; Transliteration: "Shitei" (Japanese: 師弟)	October 31, 2019
15	15	"The Fisherman"; Transliteration: "Ryōshi" (Japanese: 漁師)	October 31, 2019
16	16	"The Rakshasa"; Transliteration: "Rasetsu" (Japanese: 羅刹)	October 31, 2019
17	17	"The Devil Lance"; Transliteration: "Masō" (Japanese: 魔槍)	October 31, 2019
18	18	"Oddities"; Transliteration: "Ijō" (Japanese: 異常)	October 31, 2019
19	19	"Volition"; Transliteration: "Iji" (Japanese: 意地)	October 31, 2019
20	20	"Champions"; Transliteration: "Ōja" (Japanese: 王者)	October 31, 2019
21	21	"The Abyss"; Transliteration: "Shin'en" (Japanese: 深淵)	October 31, 2019
22	22	"Deathmatch"; Transliteration: "Shia" (Japanese: 死合)	October 31, 2019
23	23	"The Devil"; Transliteration: "Majin" (Japanese: 魔人)	October 31, 2019
24	24	"Father"; Transliteration: "Oyaji" (Japanese: 親父)	October 31, 2019

=== Season 2 (2023–24) ===
No. overall	No. in season	Title	Directed by	Written by	Storyboarded by	Original release date
Part 1
25	1	"Omen"; Transliteration: "Chōkō" (Japanese: 兆候)	Kobayashi Hisanori	Uezu Makoto	Suzuki Iku	September 21, 2023
Despite insisting that he's fine, Ohma ends up collapsing — and recalls a childhood memory. Then, the Kengan Life-or-Death Tournament kicks off again.
26	2	"Blast Core"; Transliteration: "Baku Shin" (Japanese: 爆芯)	Matsui Hitoyuki	Uezu Makoto	Betsuyaku Hiroyuki	September 21, 2023
Takeshi Wakatsuki was raised to be the ultimate fighter for Furumi Pharma, but even he's intimidated by his opponent, Julius Reinhold.
27	3	"The Clown"; Transliteration: "Dōke" (Japanese: 道化)	Nonaka Ato	Uezu Makoto	Tanaka Takahiro	September 21, 2023
The crowd goes wild when Jun Sekibayashi enters the arena as Marvelous Seki, his legendary pro-wrestler persona.
28	4	"Dignity"; Transliteration: "Kyōji" (Japanese: 矜持)	Suzuki Takuma	Uezu Makoto	Okumura Yoshiaki	September 21, 2023
During his match against Muteba, Jun Sekibayashi remembers how his life changed when he began training as a pro wrestler at 15-years-old.
29	5	"Suicide Attack"; Transliteration: "Tokkō" (Japanese: 特攻)	Gotou Yasunori	Uezu Makoto	Fukuda Michio	September 21, 2023
Saw Paing is known for his match-ending head-butts, but his lightning-fast opponent Rei Mikazuchi might not let him get close enough to use it.
30	6	"An Old Friend"; Transliteration: "Kyūyū" (Japanese: 旧友)	Kobayashi Hisanori	Uezu Makoto	Betsuyaku Hiroyuki	September 21, 2023
All Setsuna Kiryu wants to do is win this match — and the next two matches — so he can face the man he's been dreaming of: Ohma himself.
31	7	"Hell"; Transliteration: "Jigoku" (Japanese: 地獄)	Hirai Yoshimichi	Uezu Makoto	Okumura Yoshiaki	September 21, 2023
The bout between Setsuna and Gensai Kuroki comes to an end. Ohma remains hospitalized, leaving the Nogi Group with Sen Hatsumi as their only fighter.
32	8	"Resurrection"; Transliteration: "Fukkatsu" (Japanese: 復活)	Suzuki Takuma	Uezu Makoto	Matsuzono Hiroshi	September 21, 2023
Having survived 45 hanging attempts, death row convict Yohei Bando has a certain physical advantage that he deploys against Sen Hatsumi.
33	9	"Superiority"; Transliteration: "Chōetsu" (Japanese: 超越)	Matsui Hitoyuki	Uezu Makoto	Matsui Hitoyuki	September 21, 2023
While facing Kaolan Wongsawat, Agito Kanoh begins moving in a strange way; he seems to have developed a brand-new fighting style during their match.
34	10	"Life and Death"; Transliteration: "Seisatsu" (Japanese: 生殺)	Nonaka Ato	Uezu Makoto	Kobayashi Daichi	September 21, 2023
After the match between Kaolan and Agito, round two of the Kengan Life-or-Death Tournament comes to an end. Suddenly, a change of schedule is announced.
35	11	"Rebel Flag"; Transliteration: "Hanki" (Japanese: 反旗)	Kanamori Masaru	Uezu Makoto	Betsuyaku Hiroyuki	September 21, 2023
Hayami gives everyone a choice; either join him or die. When Ohma was a kid in the slums, Niko Tokita trained him the ways of the Niko fighting style.
36	12	"Melee"; Transliteration: "Konsen" (Japanese: 混戦)	Gotou Yasunori	Uezu Makoto	Sotokawa Kei	September 21, 2023
With Ohma still in his hospital room, Hayami and his men attempt to complete their coup — but there might be a traitor foiling their plans.
Part 2
37	13	"Headstrong"	Unknown	Unknown	TBA	August 15, 2024
38	14	"Reflecting Water"	Unknown	Unknown	TBA	August 15, 2024
39	15	"Ace In The Hole"	Unknown	Unknown	TBA	August 15, 2024
40	16	"Culmination"	Unknown	Unknown	TBA	August 15, 2024
41	17	"Gathering Clouds"	Unknown	Unknown	TBA	August 15, 2024
42	18	"The Floating Cloud"	Unknown	Unknown	TBA	August 15, 2024
43	19	"Predicament"	Unknown	Unknown	TBA	August 15, 2024
44	20	"Demon"	Unknown	Unknown	TBA	August 15, 2024
45	21	"Farewell"	Unknown	Unknown	TBA	August 15, 2024
46	22	"Wakatsuki"	Unknown	Unknown	TBA	August 15, 2024
47	23	"Wholehearted"	Unknown	Unknown	TBA	August 15, 2024
48	24	"Supreme Strength"	Unknown	Unknown	TBA	August 15, 2024
49	25	"Giant Star"	Unknown	Unknown	TBA	August 15, 2024
50	26	"The Finals"	Unknown	Unknown	TBA	August 15, 2024
51	27	"Victory"	Unknown	Unknown	TBA	August 15, 2024
52	28	"Finale"	Unknown	Unknown	TBA	August 15, 2024
