= List of How Heavy Are the Dumbbells You Lift? chapters =

How Heavy Are the Dumbbells You Lift? is Japanese manga series written by Yabako Sandrovich and illustrated by MAAM. Set in the same universe as Sandrovich's other work Kengan Ashura, it began serialization on Shogakukan's Ura Sunday website and MangaONE app on August 5, 2016. The manga went on hiatus in October 2023 and resumed in August 2024. Shogakukan has compiled its chapters into individual tankōbon volumes. The first volume was published on December 19, 2016. As of August 19, 2024, twenty volumes have been published. In North America, Seven Seas Entertainment announced the acquisition of the manga for an English release in April 2019. The first volume was published on November 26, 2019.

== Volumes ==
| No. | Original release date | Original ISBN | English release date | English ISBN |
|---|---|---|---|---|
| 1 | December 19, 2016 | 978-4-09-127466-3 | November 26, 2019 | 978-1-64505-292-0 |
1. "Joining Up" (入会, Nyūkai); 2. "Bench Press" (ベンチプレス, Benchi Puresu); 3. "Squat" (スクワット, Sukuwatto); 4. "Stretching" (ストレッチ, Sutoretchi); 5. "Planks" (プランク, Puranku); 6. "Lat Putdown" (ラットプルダウン, Ratto Puru Daun); 7. "Cheat Day" (チートデイ, Chīto Dei); 8. "Dumbbell Curls" (ダンベルカール, Danberu Kāru); 9. "Front Press" (フロントプレス, Furonto Puresu); 10. "Chest Press M/C" (チェストプレスマシン, Chesuto Puresu Mashin); Bonus (おまけ, Omake)
| 2 | June 12, 2017 | 978-4-09-127632-2 | February 25, 2020 | 978-1-64505-293-7 |
11. "Dips" (ティップス, Tippusu); 12. "Burpees" (バービー, Bābī); 13. "Leg Curls" (レッグカール, Reggu Kāru); 14. "Bicycle Crunches" (バイシクルクランチ, Baishikuru Kuranchi); 15. "Pull-ups" (チンニング, Chinningu); 16. "Sauna" (サウナ); 17. "Arm-Wrestling 1" (アームレスリング①, Āmu Resuringu Ichi); 18. "Arm-Wrestling 2" (アームレスリング②, Āmu Resuringu Ni); 19. "Calisthenics" (反動トレーニング, Handō Torēningu); Bonus (おまけ, Omake)
| 3 | December 12, 2017 | 978-4-09-128050-3 | June 2, 2020 | 978-1-64505-452-8 |
20. "Beef" (牛肉, Gyūniku); 21. "Hunchback" (猫背, Nekoze); 22. "Active Rest" (アクティブレスト, Akutibu Resuto); 23. "Deadlift" (デッドリフト, Deddo Rifuto); 24. "Skull Crushers" (スカルクラッシャー, Sukaru Kurasshā); 25. "Posing" (ポージング, Pōjingu); 26. "Incline Bench" (インクラインベンチ, Inkurain Benchi); 27. "Stair Climbing" (階段, Kaidan); 28. "Street Workout" (ストリートワークアウト, Sutorīto Wākuauto); Bonus (おまけ, Omake)
| 4 | April 12, 2018 | 978-4-09-128266-8 | December 22, 2020 | 978-1-64505-519-8 |
29. "Wrestler's Bridge" (レスラーブリッジ, Resurā Burijji); 30. "Side Bend" (サイドベント, Saido Bento); 31. "Calf Raise" (カーフレイズ, Kāfu Reizu); 32. "Marathon Training" (マラソン用の筋トレ, Marason-yō no Kintore); 33. "Hand Grippers" (ハンドグリッブ, Hando Guribbu); 34. "Wall Sits" (空気椅子, Kūki Isu); 35. "Resistance Bands" (チューブトレーニング, Chūbu Toreēningu); 36. "Competition" (大会, Taikai); 37. "Supplements" (プロテイン&サプリメント, Purotein Ando Sapurimento); 38. "Punching Strength" (パンチ力, Panchi Ryoku)
| 5 | October 19, 2018 | 978-4-09-128674-1 | February 23, 2021 | 978-1-64505-776-5 |
39. "Progressive Muscle Relaxation" (漸進的筋弛緩法, Zenshinteki Kinshikanhō); 40. "Treadmill" (ルームランナー, Rūmuran'nā); 41. "Ab Wheel" (アブローラー, Abu Rōrā); 42. "Burn Machine" (バーンマシン, Bān Mashin); 43. "Leg Press" (レッグプレス, Reggu Puresu); 44. "Static Stretches" (静的ストレッチ, Seiteki Sutoretchi); 45. "Caterpillar Crawls" (脇締め, Waki Shime); 46. "Wrist Curls" (リストカール, Risuto Kāru); 47. "BDNF"; Bonus (おまけ, Omake)
| 6 | January 18, 2019 | 978-4-09-128756-4 | April 13, 2021 | 978-1-64505-966-0 |
48. "Hiking Up a Mountain" (山の歩き方, Yama no Aruki Kata); 49. "Rope Climbing" (ロープクライミング, Rōpu Kuraimingu); 50. "EMS" (EMS マシン, EMS Mashin); 51. "Hip Thrusts" (ヒップスラスト, Hippu Surasuto); 52. "Decline Bench Press" (デクラインベンチプレス, Dekurain Benchi Puresu); 53. "Shrugs" (シュラッグ, Shuraggu); 54. "Push-ups" (プッシュアップ, Pusshu Appu); 55. "Personal Training" (パーソナルトレーニング, Pāsonaru Torēningu); 56. "Abdominal Machine" (アブドミナルマシン, Abudominaru Mashin)
| 7 | June 19, 2019 | 978-4-09-129238-4 | August 10, 2021 | 978-1-64827-278-3 |
57. "Hammer Curls" (ハンマーカール, Hanmā Kāru); 58. "Floor Press" (フロアプレス, Furoa Puresu); 59. "Practice Swings" (素振り, Suburi); 60. "Weight Plates" (プレートトレーニング, Purēto Torēningu); 61. "Reverse-Grip Bench Press" (リバースグリップベンチプレス, Ribāsu Gurippu Benchi Puresu); 62. "Super-slow Training" (スロートレーニング, Surō Torēningu); 63. "Abdominal Circuit" (腹筋サーキット, Fukkin Sākitto); 64. "Bulgarian Split Squats" (ブルガリアンスクワット, Burugarian Sukuwatto); Bonus (おまけ, Omake)
| 8 | August 8, 2019 | 978-4-09-129375-6 | November 16, 2021 | 978-1-64827-349-0 |
65. "KVA and DVA" (動体視力, Dōtai Shiryoku); 66. "Static Stretches (Shoulders)" (静的ストレッチ, Seiteki Sutoretchi); 67. "Drop Sets" (ドロップセット, Doroppu Setto); 68. "Dumbbell Shoulder Press" (ダンベルショルダープレス, Danberu Shorudā Puresu); 69. "How to Improve Tech Neck" (ストレートネック改善法, Sutorēto Nekku Kaizen-hō); 70. "Lateral Raise" (サイドレイズ, Saido Reizu); 71. "Bouldering" (ボルダリング, Borudaringu); 72. "Sidestepping" (反復横跳び, Hanpuku Yoko Tobi)
| 9 | April 10, 2020 | 978-4-09-850092-5 | October 18, 2022 | 978-1-63858-141-3 |
73. "Front Squat" (フロントスクワット, Furonto Sukuwatto); 74. "Reverse Abdominal Breathing" (逆腹式呼吸, Fukushikikokyū o Gyaku ni Suru); 75. "Calisthenic Lat Pulldown" (自重ラットプルダウン, Jichō Ratto Puru Daun); 76. "Radial Flexion" (ラジアルフレクション, Rajiarufurekushon); 77. "Finger Grip Exerciser" (フィンガーグリップ, Fingā Gurippu); 78. "Reverse Grip Push-Up" (リバースグリッププッシュアップ, Ribāsu Gurippu Pusshuappu); 79. "Throat Training" (喉のトレーニング, Nodo no Torēningu); 80. "French Press" (フレンチプレス, Furenchi Puresu); 81. "Pike Press" (パイクプレス, Paiku Puresu); Bonus (おまけ, Omake)
| 10 | August 12, 2020 | 978-4-09-850219-6 | January 31, 2023 | 978-1-63858-232-8 |
82. "Pressure Points" (ツボ押し, Tsubo-oshi); 83. "Side Hip Lift" (サイドヒップリフト, Saido Hippu Rifuto); 84. "Lunge" (ランジ, Ranji); 85. "KAATSU Training" (加圧トレーニング, Kaatsu Torēningu); 86. "Cossack Squat" (コサックスクワット, Kosakku Sukuwatto); 87. "HIIT"; 88. "Farmer's Walk" (ファーマーズウォーク, Fāmāzu Wōku); 89. "Jump Rope" (縄跳び, Nawatobi); 90. "Hanging Leg Raise" (ハンギングレッグレイズ, Hangingu Reggu Reizu); Bonus (おまけ, Omake)
| 11 | January 19, 2021 | 978-4-09-850436-7 | May 23, 2023 | 978-1-63858-603-6 |
91. "HMB"; 92. "Wrist Ball" (リストボール, Risuto Bōru); 93. "Chest Fly" (ペックフライ, Pekku Furai); 94. "Tire Flip" (タイヤフリップ, Taiya Furippu); 95. "Box Jump" (ボックスジャンプ, Bokkusu Janpu); 96. "Close Grip Bench Press" (ナローベンチプレス, Narō Benchi Puresu); 97. "Kettlebell" (ケトルベル, Ketoruberu); 98. "Barbell Clean" (クリーン, Kurīn); 99. "Hammer Training" (ハンマートレーニング, Hanmā Torēningu); Bonus (おまけ, Omake)
| 12 | April 12, 2021 | 978-4-09-850500-5 | August 29, 2023 | 978-1-63858-830-6 |
100. "Wheelbarrow" (手押し車, Teoshi-sha); 101. "Pushdowns" (プッシュダウン, Pusshu Daun); 102. "Shadowboxing" (シャドーボクシング, Shadōbokushingu); 103. "Neck Harness" (ネックハーネス, Nekku Hānesu); 104. "Neck Exercises" (首のトレーニング, Kubi no Torēningu); 105. "Svend Press" (スペンドプレス, Supendo Puresu); 106. "Towel Rowing" (タオルローイング, Taoru Rōingu); 107. "Hip Extensions" (ヒップエクステンション, Hippu Ekusutenshon); 108. "Ladder Exercises" (ラダートレーニング, Radā Torēningu); Bonus (おまけ, Omake)
| 13 | August 11, 2021 | 978-4-09-850665-1 | December 5, 2023 | 978-1-68579-622-8 |
109. "Resistance Training" (レジステッドトレーニング, Rejisuteddo Torēningu); 110. "Balance Training" (バランストレーニング, Baransu Torēningu); 111. "Sissy Squats" (シシースクワット, Shishī Sukuwatto); 112. "Strength Training (Back)" (強くなる筋トレ (背中), Tsuyokunaru-kin Tore (Senaka)); 113. "Strength Training (Legs)" (強くなる筋トレ (脚), Tsuyokunaru-kin Tore (Ashi)); 114. "Strength Training (Torso)" (強くなる筋トレ(体幹), Tsuyokunaru-kin Tore (Taikan)); 115. "Strength Training (Finger)" (強くなる筋トレ (指), Tsuyokunaru-kin Tore (Yubi)); 116. "High Protein Foods" (高タンパク食品, Kō Tanpaku Shokuhin); 117. "How to Improve Pitching" (ピッチング上達法, Pitchingu Jōtatsuhō); Bonus (おまけ, Omake)
| 14 | December 10, 2021 | 978-4-09-850830-3 | April 2, 2024 | 978-1-63858-831-3 |
118. "Draw-In" (ドローイン, Dorōin); 119. "Finger Curls" (フィンガーカール, Fingā Kāru); 120. "Woodchopper" (ウッドチョッパー, Uddo Choppā); 121. "Battle Rope" (バトルロープ, Batoru Rōpu); 122. "Coffee" (コーヒー, Kōhī); 123. "Double-Split Workout" (ダブルスプリット, Daburu Supuritto); 124. "Bedtime Ritual" (入眠儀式, Nyūmin Gishiki); 125. "Dumbbell Floor Press" (ダンベルフロアプレス, Danberu Furoa Puresu); 126. "Super Set" (スーパーセット, Sūpā Setto); Bonus (おまけ, Omake)
| 15 | May 18, 2022 | 978-4-09-851109-9 | August 13, 2024 | 979-8-88843-592-2 |
127. "Powerlifting" (パワーリフティング, Pawārifutingu); 128. "Superman Plank" (スーパーマンプランク, Sūpāman Puranku); 129. "One-Legged Stand" (片足立ち, Kataashi Tachi); 130. "Muscle Memory" (マッスルメモリー, Massuru Memorī); 131. "Hanging Windshield Wiper" (ハンギングワイパー, Hangingu Waipā); 132. "Loosening Stiff Shoulders" (肩のストレッチ, Kata no Sutoretchi); 133. "Facial Exercises" (表情筋のトレーニング, Hyōjōkin no Torēningu); 134. "Water Walking" (水中ウォーキング, Suichū Wōkingu); 135. "Protective Gear" (トレーニングギア, Torēningugia); Bonus (おまけ, Omake)
| 16 | July 19, 2022 | 978-4-09-851199-0 | December 10, 2024 | 979-8-88843-593-9 |
136. "Adjustable Dumbbells" (可変式ダンベル, Kahenshiki Danberu); 137. "Abdominal Machine" (アブドミナルマシン, Abudominaru Mashin); 138. "Hanging" (ぶら下がり, Burasagari); 139. "Weighted Push-up" (加重腕立て伏せ, Kajū Udetatefuse); 140. "Hole Digging" (穴掘り, Ana Hori); 141. "Shoulder Stretches" (肩のストレッチ, Kata no Sutoretchi); 142. "Abduction" (アブダクション, Abudakushon); 143. "Training Shoes" (トレーニングシューズ, Torēningushūzu); 144. "Fitness Space for Rent" (個室ジム, Koshitsu Jimu); Bonus (おまけ, Omake)
| 17 | December 19, 2022 | 978-4-09-851451-9 | April 1, 2025 | 979-8-89160-555-8 |
145. "Incline Arm Curls" (インクラインアームカール, Inkurain'āmukāru); 146. "PFC Balance" (PFCバランス, PFC Baransu); 147. "Glute Bridge Bench Press" (ケツ上げベンチプレス, Ketsu Age Benchi Puresu); 148. "Daily Benching" (エブリベンチ, Eburi Benchi); 149. "5×5 Training" (5×5トレーニング, 5 × 5 Torēningu); 150. "Seated Shrug" (シーテッドシュラッグ, Shīteddo Shuraggu); 151. "Toe Raises" (トゥレイズ, Tureizu); 152. "Limb Forging" (部位鍛錬, Bui Tanren); 153. "Spider Plank" (スパイダープランク, Supaidā Puranku); Bonus (おまけ, Omake)
| 18 | April 12, 2023 | 978-4-09-852002-2 | August 12, 2025 | 979-8-89373-563-5 |
154. "Interval Length" (インターバルの長さ, Intābaru no Nagasa); 155. "Exercise Bike" (エアロバイク, Earobaiku); 156. "Dumbbell Squat" (ダンベルスクワット, Danberu Sukuwatto); 157. "Hack Lift" (ハックリフト, Hakkurifuto); 158. "Low Bar Squat" (ローバースクワット, Rōbā Sukuwatto); 159. "Hindu Push-up" (ヒンズープッシュアップ, Hinzū Pusshu Appu); 160. "Partner Workouts" (ペアトレーニング, Peatorēningu); 161. "Dark Room Fitness" (暗闇フィットネス, Kurayami Fittonesu); 162. "Bear Crawl" (ベアクロール, Beakurōru); Bonus (おまけ, Omake)
| 19 | September 19, 2023 | 978-4-09-852832-5 | December 2, 2025 | 979-8-89373-564-2 |
163. "Weightlifting Chains" (トレーニングチェーン, Torēningu Chēn); 164. "Arnold Press" (アーノルドプレス, Ānorudo Puresu); 165. "Dumbbell Fly" (ダンベルフライ, Danberu Furai); 166. "Preacher Curl" (プリーチャーカール, Purīchā Kāru); 167. "Parallel Grip Chin-Ups" (パラレルグリップチンニング, Parareru Gurippu Chin'ningu); 168. "Shoulder Roll" (ショルダーロール, Shorudā Rōru); 169. "Application of Force" (力のかけ方, Chikara no Kakekata); 170. "Holding Strength" (ホールド力, Hōrudo Ryoku); 171 "Meat Substitutes" (代用肉, Daiyōniku); Bonus (おまけ, Omake)
| 20 | August 19, 2024 | 978-4-09-853528-6 | April 14, 2026 | 979-8-89373-811-7 |
172. "Workout Volume" (左右のトレーニング量, Sayū no Torēningu Ryō); 173. "Russian Twist" (ロシアンツイスト, Roshian Tsuisuto); 174. "Muscle Up" (マッスルアップ, Massuru Appu); 175. "Ankle Hop" (アンクルホップ, Ankuru Hoppu); 176. "Decrease Injury Risk" (怪我リスクの下げ方, Kega Risuku no Sage-kata); 177. "Body Weight Calf Raises" (自重カーフレイズ, Jichō Kāfureizu); 178. "Reverse Snow Angel" (リバーススノーエンジェル, Ribāsu Sunō Enjeru); 179. "Neck Flexion" (ネックフレクション, Nekku Furekushon); 180. "Jumping Lunge" (ジャンピングランジ, Janpingu Ranji); Bonus (おまけ, Omake)

=== Chapters not yet in tankōbon format ===
181. Bikini Kontesuto (ビキニコンテスト)
182. Supaidā Kāru (スパイダーカール)
183. Kurosutorēnā (クロストレーナー)
184. Rūmania Deddo Rifuto (ルーマニアンデッドリフト)
185. Appuraito Rou (アップライトロウ)
