= Star: Strike It Rich =

Japanese manga series

- First tankōbon volume cover, featuring Hina Hongou

一勝千金 (Isshō Senkin)
- Genre: Sports
- Manga
- Written by: Yabako Sandrovich
- Illustrated by: MAAM
- Published by: Shogakukan
- English publisher: NA: Comikey
- Imprint: Ura Shōnen Sunday Comics
- Magazine: Ura Sunday; MangaONE
- Original run: May 1, 2023 – present
- Volumes: 7

Star: Strike It Rich (Japanese: 一勝千金, Hepburn: Isshō Senkin; lit. 'The Priceless Victory'), stylized as ST☆R: Strike it Rich, is a Japanese manga series written by Yabako Sandrovich and illustrated by MAAM, set in the same continuity as Sandrovich's Kengan Ashura. It began serialization in Shogakukan's Ura Sunday website and MangaONE app in May 2023.

== Plot ==
A group of three friends start an underground women's fighting organization to make money. It proves very lucrative, but to constantly surpass their previous fights, they bring increasingly powerful women into the ring. This gradually draws them deeper into the affairs of a cult that has trained nine women to become ultimate fighters. These nine must fight each other to determine which of them is destined to usher in a new world order.

== Publication ==
Written by Yabako Sandrovich and illustrated by MAAM, who had previously worked together on How Heavy Are The Dumbbells You Lift?, Star: Strike It Rich began serialization on Shogakukan's Ura Sunday website and MangaONE app on May 1, 2023. Its chapters have been compiled into seven tankōbon volumes as of August 2026. The series' chapters are published in English by Comikey.

No.	Release date	ISBN
1	September 19, 2023	978-4-09-852833-2
2	April 19, 2024	978-4-09-853168-4
3	August 19, 2024	978-4-09-853529-3
4	December 12, 2024	978-4-09-853748-8
5	May 12, 2025	978-4-09-854098-3
6	October 10, 2025	978-4-09-854282-6
7	August 19, 2026	978-4-09-854730-2

== Reception ==
The series was nominated for the tenth Next Manga Awards in 2024 in the web category and was ranked ninth.
