= Yakusha =

Yakusha may refer to

- Yakusha-e, Japanese woodblock prints of kabuki actors
- Yakusha Kure, a character from the Japanese manga series How Heavy Are the Dumbbells You Lift?
- Vasil Yakusha (1958–2020), Belarusian rower
