= SoulWorker =

- Developers: Lion Games Studios, VALOFE GLOBAL Ltd
- Publishers: JPN: Hangame; KOR: VALOFE GLOBAL Ltd; TWN/ENG: G.O.P Co., Ltd.
- Engine: Vision
- Platform: Microsoft Windows
- Release: JP: April 6, 2016; KOR: January 18, 2017; TWN/ENG: October 2, 2020 (May 13, 2021 for English players)
- Genre: Massively multiplayer online action role-playing game
- Mode: Multiplayer

SoulWorker (Hangul: 소울워커, also known as SoulWorker Online) is an anime-style free action massively multiplayer online role-playing game (MMOARPG) developed by Lion Games Studios from South Korea. The game story takes place fifteen years ago after a portal, known as the void, started bringing demons into the world. Fifteen years later, children that were once lost to the void were transported back to their world. Armed with supernatural powers, these children were to be known as SoulWorkers.

SoulWorker was first released in Japan on April 6, 2016, with Hangame publishing the game. The Korean version was published by Smilegate on January 18, 2017, while the English version entered Open Beta on February 26, 2018, with Gameforge as its publisher.

The English version of the game that was published by Gameforge ceased its service on April 30, 2021. Lion Games Studios launched a new English server on May 13, 2021. It shares the same game client as the Taiwanese version and is only available from Steam

== Characters ==
SoulWorker features six playable characters that have their own unique weapons and skills. Character skills can further be improved by leveling through quests and dungeons. Additionally, players also gain access to more skills as they increase in level.

Haru Estia

Voiced by: Lee Bo-hee (Korean); Ai Kayano (Japanese)

Haru is a 17 years old girl falling under the Soulum class. Despite her shy and timid exterior, inside her burns a flame fueled by revenge. Haru takes down her enemies through the use of her companion, the Soulum sword.

Erwin Arclight

Voiced by: Park Seong-tae (Korean); Hiro Shimono (Japanese)

Erwin is an 18 years old guy utilizing the Gun Jazz. As a Gun Jazz user, he can utilize his twin pistol to perform devastating skill attacks such as Sky High and Soulcaster. Formerly known as a TV star, his supreme confidence is mostly overshadowed by his extreme curiosity; often facing danger with an overconfident grin.

Lily Bloommerchen

Voiced by: Kim Hyeon-ji (Korean); Ibuki Kido (Japanese)

During the descending of the demons from the void fifteen years ago, Lilly's sibling was murdered. This resulted to the letting loose of Lilly's madness; with her soul manifesting as the Mist Scythe. Lilly's fighting style can be described as something brutal; utilizing skills such as Carnage and Guillotine to end the lives of her enemies.

Stella Unibell

Voiced by: Lee Jae-hyun (Korean); Risa Taneda (Japanese)

Despite her vulnerable and cute appearance, Stella shouldn't be underestimated. Her soul screams through her Howling Guitar, capable of dealing a wide range of damage. Inside her weapon rests a demon known as, 'Fuu-chan' capable of performing earth shattering attacks to defend Stella at any cost.

Jin Seipatsu

Voiced by: Kim Hye-seong (Korean); Tomoaki Maeno (Japanese)

Jin is a 17 year old male specializing in the use of Spirit Arms. As a trained defensive-fighter, Jin is capable of bringing a wide range of brawl-style skills into the battlefield.

Iris Yuma

Voiced by: Park Shin-hee (Korean); Ai Kakuma (Japanese)

Iris is the youngest daughter of the traditional and well-established Yuma family. As a future successor, she was forced to conform to the standards of her family from a young age. During the events of the void, her family died and she was swallowed by the void. Iris utilizes a hammer capable of dealing with enemies from both short and long range.

== Development and release ==
SoulWorker was developed by Lion Games. It was released in April 2016 in Japan and January 2017 in South Korea. It was originally published by Smilegate until March 2022, after which Lion Games took it over as self-publication.

Lion Games financially struggled around 2020. It had licensed the property to third-party developer for Soulworker Zero (2019) and Soulworker Academia (2020), and developed Soulworker Rush (2022) and SoulInverse (2023). All of these were commercial failure and closed down within a year. In 2022, the company suffered a major net loss of ₩1,800,000,000. On 29 December 2023, the developer laid off the development staff, and announced it would no longer manage SoulWorker due to being unable to fund the development cost. It was announced on the same day the property was sold to Valofe, which took over the development and publication. Point Daily reported Lion Games had gone de facto bankrupt due to no longer being able to create any video games.

== Anime ==
- SoulWorker
- Original net animation

Soul Worker: Your Destiny Awaits
- Directed by: Hiroyuki Betsuyaku
- Studio: Larx Entertainment
- Released: March 17, 2016 – April 5, 2016
- Runtime: 4 minutes (each)
- Episodes: 5

A five-episode original net animation (ONA) adaptation was produced by Larx Entertainment and directed by Hiroyuki Betsuyaku. The ONA ran from March 17, 2016, to April 5, 2016. "Burning Soul" by GARNiDELiA was used for the ending theme of episode five.
