= Larx Entertainment =

Japanese animation studio

Larx Entertainment Co., Ltd.
- Native name: 株式会社ラークスエンタテインメント
- Romanized name: Kabushiki-gaisha Raakusu Entateinmento
- Type: Kabushiki gaisha
- Industry: Japanese animation
- Founded: July 2006; 20 years ago
- Headquarters: Toyotamakita, Nerima, Tokyo, Japan
- Key people: Seiji Mitsunobu (CEO)
- Total equity: ¥ 10,000,000
- Number of employees: 40
- Parent: Studio Hibari
- Subsidiaries: Sao Sang Design (2010–2022, reorganized into Hibari Vietnam)
- Website: www.larx.co.jp

Larx Entertainment Co., Ltd. (Japanese: 株式会社ラークスエンタテインメント, Hepburn: Kabushiki-gaisha Raakusu Entateinmento) is a Japanese animation studio founded in June 2006 as a subsidiary of Studio Hibari. It is based in Nerima, Tokyo.

== Works ==
=== Television series ===
Title	Broadcast Channel	First run start date	First run end date	Eps	Note(s)	Ref(s)
Monsuno	Nicktoons; TV Tokyo (Note: The third and final season, containing episodes 53–65, was never aired or dubbed in Japan.); Hulu (Note: In the United States, season 3 premiered exclusively on Hulu on July 1, 2014.)	February 23, 2012	July 1, 2014	65	An American–Japanese produced animated series.	

=== Original net animation ===
Title	Release Date	Eps	Note(s)	Ref(s)
Soul Worker: Your Destiny Awaits	March 17, 2016 – April 5, 2016	5	Based on an anime-style free action MMORPG developed by Lion Games Studios.	
Kengan Ashura	July 31, 2019 – August 15, 2024	52	Based on an action manga of the same name written by Yabako Sandrovich.	
Tekken: Bloodline	August 18, 2022	6	Based on a fighting video game franchise developed by Bandai Namco Studios. Co-produced with Studio Hibari.	
