= Kengan Ashura =

Japanese manga series

- First tankōbon volume cover, featuring Ohma Tokita

ケンガンアシュラ
- Genre: Martial arts
- Manga
- Written by: Yabako Sandrovich
- Illustrated by: Daromeon
- Published by: Shogakukan
- English publisher: NA: Comikey
- Imprint: Ura Sunday Comics
- Magazine: Ura Sunday; MangaONE
- Original run: April 18, 2012 – August 9, 2018
- Volumes: 27 + 1 extra
- Manga

Kengan Omega
- Written by: Yabako Sandrovich
- Illustrated by: Daromeon
- Published by: Shogakukan
- English publisher: NA: Comikey
- Imprint: Ura Sunday Comics
- Magazine: Ura Sunday; MangaONE
- Original run: January 17, 2019 – present
- Volumes: 34
- Original net animation
- Directed by: Seiji Kishi
- Written by: Makoto Uezu; Gō Zappa
- Music by: Yasuharu Takanashi
- Studio: Larx Entertainment
- Licensed by: Netflix
- Released: July 31, 2019 – August 15, 2024
- Episodes: 52
- Anime film

Baki Hanma vs. Kengan Ashura
- Directed by: Toshiki Hirano
- Written by: Atsuo Ishino
- Music by: Team MAX
- Studio: TMS Entertainment
- Licensed by: Netflix
- Released: June 6, 2024
- Runtime: 65 minutes
- icon

Kengan Ashura (ケンガンアシュラ) is a Japanese manga series written by Yabako Sandrovich and illustrated by Daromeon. It was serialized on Shogakukan's Ura Sunday website from April 2012 to August 2018, with its chapters collected in 27 tankōbon volumes. A sequel, titled Kengan Omega, began in January 2019.

It was adapted into an original net animation (ONA) series. The first 12-episode part premiered in July 2019 on Netflix; the second 12-episode part premiered in October of that same year. A second season premiered in September 2023 with a 12-episode first part; the second 16-episode part premiered in August 2024.

== Summary ==
Since the Edo period of Japan, gladiator arenas have existed in various forms around the world. In these arenas, wealthy business owners and merchants hire gladiators to fight in unarmed combat where the winner takes all, called Kengan matches. Yamashita Kazuo, an average Japanese salaryman for Nogi Group witnesses a street fight in an alley between two mysterious fighters. One of the fighters, Tokita "Ashura" Ohma is scouted out by the Nogi Group CEO, Nogi Hideki, due to defeating their previous fighter in the street fight. Kazuo is roped into managing Ohma who joins these arenas only to devastate his opponents. His spectacular ability to crush his enemies catches the attention of big business owners, leading to his inclusion in the Kengan Annihilation Tournament under the invitation of Hideki. This tournament is held by the biggest CEOs in Japan and the winner gets the seat of Kengan Association chairman, a position which holds immense power and prestige. As the tournament unfolds Ohma tests his strength while struggling with his mysterious past coming back to haunt him as Kazuo struggles with managing Ohma and figuring out the true intentions as to why he was invited to this tournament.

== Characters ==
Ohma Tokita (十鬼蛇 王馬, Tokita Ōma)
Voiced by: Tatsuhisa Suzuki (Japanese); Kaiji Tang (English)
A fighter in his late 20s, he defeats another combatant in a dark alley, catching the attention of the Nogi Group, which recruits him as its representative for the Kengan Association. Kazuo Yamashita becomes his caretaker as they navigate the Kengan matches and later the Kengan Annihilation Tournament. Known as "Ashura" in the fighting circuit, he employs the Niko Style, a martial art taught by his late master Tokita Niko. The style incorporates four katas: Adamantine, Flame, Redirection, and Water.
Kazuo Yamashita (山下 一夫, Yamashita Kazuo)
Voiced by: Chō (Japanese); Keith Silverstein (English)
A 56-year old salaryman of the Nogi Group. After a fateful encounter with Ohma Tokita, he was reassigned to be Ohma's caretaker by order of the Nogi Group's CEO. Skittish and meek, something awakens inside of him as he ventures deeper into the Kengan matches, as well as his bond with Ohma. Later made President of the Yamashita Trading Co., a shell company of the Nogi Group.
Hideki Nogi (乃木 英樹, Nogi Hideki)
Voiced by: Jouji Nakata (Japanese); Michael C. Pizzuto (English)
CEO of the Nogi Group. He challenges the Kengan Association for the position of Chairman, resulting in the creation of the Annihilation Tournament with a stipulation that, if the Nogi Group fails to win, the company is dissolved and taken by the Kengan Association. He forms the shell company Yamashita Trading Co., with Kazuo Yamashita as its President and Ohma Tokita as its representative fighter. He also formed a 2nd shell company SF Cold Storage with Lihito as both its President and fighter.
Kaede Akiyama (秋山 楓, Akiyama Kaede)
Voiced by: Yumi Uchiyama (Japanese); Erika Harlacher (English)
Hideki Nogi's personal secretary, later assigned to help Kazuo and Ohma as they proceed into the tournament.
Lihito (理人, Rihito)
Voiced by: Hayato Kaneko (Japanese); Jonah Scott (English)
Nicknamed "The Superhuman". Ohma's 2nd opponent in the Kengan matches initially on behalf of Yoshitake Real Estate. He was later made the head of a shell company SF Cold Storage by Hideki Nogi, making him the first president/fighter in the tournament's history. His name comes from his technique, Razor's Edge, where his fingers are sharp enough to cut through flesh. His real name is Ichiro Nakata.
Jun Sekibayashi (関林 ジュン, Sekibayashi Jun)
Voiced by: Tetsu Inada (Japanese); Jake Green (English)
A pro wrestler representing the company Gandai. Nicknamed "Hell's Angel".
Cosmo Imai (今井 コスモ, Imai Kosumo)
Voiced by: Junya Enoki (Japanese); Bryce Papenbrook (English)
Specializing in Brazilian Jiu-Jitsu, he is the youngest fighter in the Kengan Annihilation tournament. He represents Nishihonji Security Services. Nicknamed "The King of Stranglers".
Setsuna Kiryū (桐生 刹那, Kiryū Setsuna)
Voiced by: Daisuke Namikawa (Japanese); Todd Haberkorn (English)
A fighter for the Koyo Academy Group. His insane attraction to Ohma has driven him to kill his own master, who murdered Ohma's master prior to the start of the series. He enters the tournament in the hopes of fighting Ohma and to be killed by him as his ultimate form of affection.

== Media ==
=== Manga ===
Written by Yabako Sandrovich and illustrated by Daromeon, Kengan Ashura was serialized in Shogakukan's online platform Ura Sunday and in the MangaONE app from April 18, 2012, to August 9, 2018. Shogakukan collected its chapters in 27 tankōbon volumes, released from December 18, 2012, to February 19, 2019.

A sequel, titled Kengan Omega (ケンガンオメガ), began its serialization on Ura Sunday and MangaONE on January 17, 2019. The sequel is set two years after the events of the original series. Shogakukan has collected its chapters into individual tankōbon volumes. The first volume was released on February 19, 2019. As of September 11, 2026, 34 volumes have been released.

Both series are licensed digitally in North America by Comikey.

==== Volumes ====
===== Kengan Ashura =====
No.	Japanese release date	Japanese ISBN
1	December 18, 2012	978-4-09-124110-8
2	January 18, 2013	978-4-09-124237-2
3	April 18, 2013	978-4-09-124332-4
4	May 17, 2013	978-4-09-124334-8
5	September 18, 2013	978-4-09-124417-8
6	October 18, 2013	978-4-09-124531-1
7	February 18, 2014	978-4-09-124600-4
8	May 16, 2014	978-4-09-124691-2
9	August 18, 2014	978-4-09-125234-0
10	October 17, 2014	978-4-09-125478-8
11	January 9, 2015	978-4-09-125709-3
12	April 10, 2015	978-4-09-126056-7
13	June 12, 2015	978-4-09-126184-7
14	October 9, 2015	978-4-09-126588-3
0	January 12, 2016; January 8, 2016 (SE)	978-4-09-127010-8; 978-4-09-941866-3 (SE)
15	March 11, 2016	978-4-09-127082-5
16	June 10, 2016	978-4-09-127300-0
17	September 9, 2016	978-4-09-127434-2
18	December 19, 2016	978-4-09-127465-6
19	February 10, 2017	978-4-09-127519-6
20	June 12, 2017	978-4-09-127633-9
21	August 18, 2017	978-4-09-127757-2
22	October 19, 2017	978-4-09-128007-7
23	December 12, 2017	978-4-09-128041-1
24	April 12, 2018	978-4-09-128267-5
25	July 12, 2018	978-4-09-128440-2
26	October 19, 2018	978-4-09-128700-7
27	February 19, 2019	978-4-09-128839-4

===== Kengan Omega =====
No.	Japanese release date	Japanese ISBN
1	February 19, 2019	978-4-09-128848-6
2	July 19, 2019	978-4-09-129290-2
3	December 19, 2019	978-4-09-129475-3
4	January 17, 2020	978-4-09-129506-4
5	April 10, 2020	978-4-09-850093-2
6	July 10, 2020	978-4-09-850195-3
7	November 12, 2020	978-4-09-850327-8
8	March 12, 2021	978-4-09-850477-0
9	June 10, 2021	978-4-09-850592-0
10	September 16, 2021	978-4-09-850701-6
11	December 10, 2021	978-4-09-850829-7
12	March 10, 2022	978-4-09-851024-5
13	June 10, 2022	978-4-09-851158-7
14	September 12, 2022	978-4-09-851276-8
15	January 12, 2023	978-4-09-851538-7
16	April 12, 2023	978-4-09-852001-5
17	July 19, 2023	978-4-09-852553-9
18	September 19, 2023	978-4-09-852831-8
19	October 19, 2023	978-4-09-852874-5
20	January 12, 2024	978-4-09-853087-8
21	March 29, 2024	978-4-09-853172-1
22	June 6, 2024	978-4-09-853404-3
23	August 19, 2024	978-4-09-853527-9
24	September 19, 2024	978-4-09-853603-0
25	October 10, 2024	978-4-09-853643-6
26	November 12, 2024	978-4-09-853695-5
27	December 12, 2024	978-4-09-853747-1
28	February 12, 2025	978-4-09-853859-1
29	May 12, 2025	978-4-09-854070-9
30	September 19, 2025	978-4-09-854247-5
31	December 12, 2025	978-4-09-854347-2
32	March 18, 2026	978-4-09-854478-3
33	June 11, 2026	978-4-09-854640-4
34	September 11, 2026	978-4-09-854770-8

=== Anime ===
Ura Sunday opened a fan poll in January 2015 to let fans decide which of their series should receive an anime adaptation. In May 2015, it was announced that Kengan Ashura had won the poll with 2.3 million out of 9 million total votes, and would be adapted into an anime. Two years later, in December 2017 it was announced that the anime was still being planned, and that it would be a television series. The staff and release window for the series were announced in March 2018. The series was directed by Seiji Kishi and written by Makoto Uezu, with animation by Larx Entertainment. Kazuaki Morita provided character designs for the anime, while Yasuharu Takanashi composed the series' music. The world premiere of the series took place at Anime Expo on July 7, 2018. The series premiered in Japan at Toho Cinemas Roppongi Hills on January 27, 2019. The series premiered on July 31, 2019. The opening theme is "King & Ashley" by My First Story, while the ending theme is "Born This Way" by BAD HOP. Netflix streamed the anime. The second part of the series, also consisting of 12 episodes, premiered on Netflix on October 31, 2019.

On March 24, 2022, it was announced that the anime is receiving a sequel. The editor of Kengan Omega manga has confirmed on Twitter that the anime continuation would adapt the original manga's story "until the end of the original (the end of the tournament)!". It was later revealed to be a second season, whose first part, consisting of 12 episodes, premiered on September 21, 2023; the second part, consisting of 16 episodes, premiered on August 15, 2024. For the first part, SiM performed the opening theme "Red", while Band-Maid performed the ending theme "Shambles". For the second part, Hey-Smith performed the opening theme "Feel My Pain", while Jin Dogg performed the ending theme song "Nani?!".

=== Other media ===
A drama CD was bundled with the special edition of volume 0 on January 8, 2016.

In July 2020, a crossover art by Daromeon and Keisuke Itagaki, featuring Ohma Tokita and Baki Hanma from Baki the Grappler, was drawn to promote both series availability on Netflix. In March 2024, Netflix announced a crossover anime of both series, titled Baki Hanma vs. Kengan Ashura, which premiered on June 6 of the same year.

Sandrovich launched another manga series, titled How Heavy Are the Dumbbells You Lift?, which is set in the same universe as Kengan Ashura. In another manga series by Sandrovich, Star: Strike It Rich, the author stated that the work is set in the same universe.

== Reception ==
By December 2017, the manga had over 1.5 million copies in circulation.
