= Jin Dogg =

Japanese rapper (born 1990)

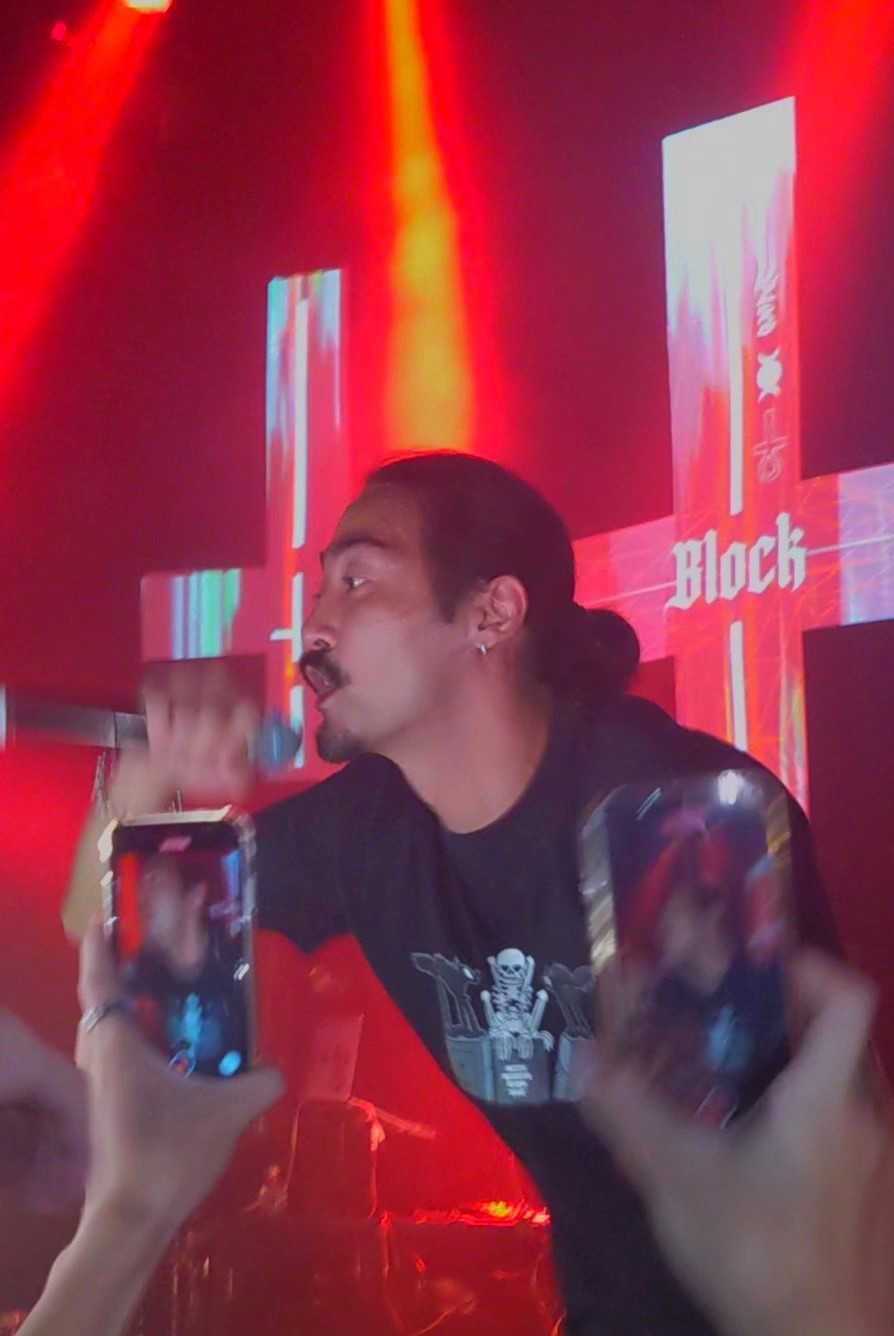
- Jin Dogg in 2023
- Born: Jake Yoon; September 10, 1990 (age 35); Osaka
- Occupation: Rapper
- Years active: 2011 - present
- Website: https://www.tunecore.co.jp/artists/jindogg?lang=ja

Jake Yoon (Born September 10, 1990), better known by his stage name Jin Dogg, is a Japanese rapper. The name Jin Dogg is derived from Snoop Dogg and the Korean Jindo dog (Korean: 진돗개; RR: Jindo-gae).

== Early life ==
Jake Yoon was born on September 10, 1990, in Osaka, Japan. His mother was a Korean immigrant, and his father a second-generation Korean living in Japan. He did not know his father as a child. Yoon grew up in Ikuno Ward in Osaka until nursery school, when he moved to Tennoji Ward. He was bullied in Tennoji Ward because there weren't many Koreans living in Japan at the time. At the age of ten, Yoon moved to South Korea and went to a school for Japanese students. In Korea, he was bullied for being from Japan and struggled with his identity.

In his fifth year of elementary school, he was influenced by his older sister of 14 years and began listening to hip-hop. In middle school, from the second half of his second year to his third year, he came to like hip-hop. He often listened to Snoop Dogg, G-Funk, and Notorious B.I.G. He also liked Deepflow and other artists popular in Korea at the time. In Japanese rap, he listened to artists like Zeebra and was also shocked by "Rollin' 045" by OZROSAURUS. During a six month long study abroad trip to Australia, he discovered and was influenced by the fighting game Def Jam: Fight for NY. At that time, Ludacris' first album was the first hip-hop album he ever bought. After the study abroad, he returned to Korea and entered in an American school, where he began rapping by freestyling in English with his friends. At the age of 18, he dropped out of the American school and transferred to a high school in Japan.

Yoon continued to connect with his Korean friends on Skype, and at that time he rapped over the beat for "A Milli" by Lil Wayne. After being invited by a friend to see a live concert of rappers ANARCHY and Hannya, Yoon graduated High School and began performing and recording music in 2011. His first recording was an English translation of ANARCHY's "24 BARS TO KILL". Around that same time, Yoon was brought along to a cypher in a friend's hometown, where he first met fellow rappers WILYWNKA and Young Coco.

== Career ==
Jin Dogg recorded and released his first EP, "Welcome to Bang Bang I.K.N" in 2012. However, after releasing the EP, he took a break from music and dealt illegal drugs. Shortly after, he moved to the south of Osaka and spent three years working as a janitor in a love hotel, an environment which he said was uncomfortable to be in. Jin Dogg, who said "originally, I wasn't the hustler type, nor did I feel like I was a boss" was worried about the contradiction between his musical persona and his real life, but during the hiatus, he discovered the "sing it like it is" style of artists like KOHH and MonyHorse, and he found his path. Jin Dogg wanted to make "dirty" music as opposed to the light lyrics of artists like KOHH, and it was in this line of thinking that he was strongly influenced by artists like Bones and Suicideboys.

Around 2015、he hit it off with studio owner Young Yujiro (whose name at the time was Radoo). Jin Dogg began going to Young Yujiro's studio and recorded and released his first mixtape 1st High～uncontrollable laughter under the label "Hibrid Entertainment", which he co-founded. Around that time he was exposed to trap through Keith Ape and Okasian. This brought Jin Dogg's music closer to trap, which up until then was influenced primarily by G-Funk. In 2017 he released his second mixtape "2nd High". The mixtape was made in a similar style to the first, but it was centered more around horror movie-like imagery.

In December of 2019, the albums SAD JAKE and MAD JAKE were released. Both albums were themed around the dual nature of violence and sentimentality. On December 16, 2023 Jin Dogg released his second album Blood&Bones (BLOOD). This album was also part of a duology, and the second entry "Blood&Bones (BONES)" was released on February 17, 2024. On August 15, 2025, Jin Dogg released his next album Pain Makes You Better.

== Musical style ==
Jin Dogg often does everything in the studio, without writing down lyrics. When he makes music, he focuses on emotion, and he considers music to be his own method of relieving stress. To him, rhyming is not as important as being satisfied with making the best use of the Kansai dialect in his style of rapping.

Jin Dogg cites Bones, Smokepurpp, and Ghostemane as his favorite artists. Additionally, he cites artists like ANARCHY, MACCHO, Kan a.k.a Gami, MessiahtheFly, Gizmo, and Bane as influences.

== Discography ==
=== Albums ===
Title	Release date
SAD JAKE	December 13, 2019
MAD JAKE	December 13, 2019
Blood & Bones (BLOOD)	December 16, 2023
Blood & Bones (BONES)	February 17, 2024
Pain Makes You Better	August 15, 2025

=== EPs and mixtapes ===
Title	Release date
1st High "抱腹絶倒" mixed by DJ BULLSET	April 9, 2016
2nd High "魑魅魍魎" mixed by DJ BULLSET	October 3, 2017
3rd High "起死回生" mixed by DJ BULLSET	November 30, 2020
HELL GATE	October 25, 2019
You Don't Know	October 7, 2021
