= Yabako Sandrovich =

Japanese manga writer

- Occupation: Manga writer
- Notable work: Kengan Ashura; How Heavy Are the Dumbbells You Lift?

Yabako Sandrovich (Japanese:サンドロビッチ・ヤバ子) is a Japanese manga writer. Two of his manga, Kengan Ashura and How Heavy Are The Dumbbells You Lift?, have been adapted to anime.

== Biography ==
Yabako Sandrovich had lost his job at an archeological site before he wrote his first manga at the age of 24, Gudo no Kobushi. He developed the manga into Kengan Ashura, serialized in Ura Sunday which was written by Sandrovich and illustrated by Daromeon. Kengan Ashura would end in 2018, and be followed by a sequel, Kengan Omega in 2019. Kengan Ashura would get an anime adaptation by Larx Entertainment, which aired from 2019 to 2024 on Netflix.

Yabako wrote the manga How Heavy Are The Dumbbells You Lift?, drawn by MAAM, which has been serialized since 2016. The manga was adapted into a 12 episode anime series by Doga Kobo. The manga takes place in the same universe as Kengan Ashura.

Yabako and MAAM would work together on another manga in 2023 called Star: Strike it Rich, which is published on Ura Sunday and MangaOne.

== Personal life ==
Yabako Sandrovich is trained in martial arts, including kendo, Shorinji Kenpo, and karate. He has sparred with his editor, who is also a trained martial artist, as inspiration for the fights in Kengan Ashura.

== Bibliography ==
- Kengan Ashura (2012–2018)
  - Kengan Omega (2019–present)
- How Heavy Are The Dumbbells You Lift? (2016–present)
- Star: Strike it Rich (2023–present)
- Blue Ursus (ブルーウルスス) (2025–present)
