= How Heavy Are the Dumbbells You Lift? =

Japanese manga series and its franchise

- First tankōbon volume cover, featuring Hibiki Sakura

ダンベル何キロ持てる？ (Danberu Nan-Kiro Moteru?)
- Genre: Comedy; Slice of life; Sports
- Manga
- Written by: Yabako Sandrovich
- Illustrated by: MAAM
- Published by: Shogakukan
- English publisher: NA: Seven Seas Entertainment
- Imprint: Ura Sunday Comics
- Magazine: Ura Sunday; MangaONE
- Original run: August 5, 2016 – present
- Volumes: 20
- Anime television series
- Directed by: Mitsue Yamazaki
- Written by: Fumihiko Shimo
- Music by: Yukari Hashimoto
- Studio: Doga Kobo
- Licensed by: Crunchyroll (Note: In North America through Crunchyroll, LLC (formerly known as Funimation).); SEA: Medialink
- Original network: AT-X, Tokyo MX, KBS, SUN, TVA, BS11
- English network: US: Crunchyroll Channel
- Original run: July 3, 2019 – September 18, 2019
- Episodes: 12
- icon

How Heavy Are the Dumbbells You Lift? (Japanese: ダンベル何キロ持てる？, Hepburn: Danberu Nan-Kiro Moteru?; lit. 'How Many Kilograms of Dumbbell Can You Lift?') is a Japanese manga series written by Yabako Sandrovich and illustrated by MAAM. It has been serialized via Shogakukan's Ura Sunday website and MangaONE app since August 2016 and has been collected into twenty tankōbon volumes as of August 2024. The manga is licensed in North America by Seven Seas Entertainment. A twelve-episode anime television series adaptation by Doga Kobo aired from July to September 2019.

== Plot ==
Hibiki Sakura is a second-year high school girl who has a voracious appetite; this habit leads to her gaining weight. Once this is brought to her attention, she reluctantly thinks about joining the Silverman Gym. At the gym, Hibiki finds out that Akemi Soryuin, a schoolmate of hers, is also thinking about joining. Upon meeting Naruzo Machio, one of the trainers, she falls heads over heels in love with him and joins the gym. Motivated, Hibiki vows to lose weight.

== Characters ==
=== Main characters ===
Hibiki Sakura (紗倉 ひびき, Sakura Hibiki)
Voiced by: Fairouz Ai (Japanese); Madeleine Morris (English)
A second-year high school girl who joins Silverman Gym to slim down. However, due to a lack of regular exercise and her terrible eating habits, she tends to tire out easily and any progress she does achieve is quickly undone. As the series progresses, her condition slowly improves and she is revealed to have a hidden talent for combat sports. She also has a brother who runs a yakiniku restaurant where she sometimes helps out.
Akemi Soryuin (奏流院 朱美, Sōryūin Akemi)
Voiced by: Sora Amamiya (Japanese); Sarah Wiedenheft (English)
A second-year high school girl who is the student council president at the same school Hibiki attends. She is popular due to being a beautiful girl who excels in sports and academics along with coming from a rich family. She has a muscle fetish and joins the Silverman Gym mostly to satisfy these desires, and often expresses her desire for Hibiki and others to become macho. Unlike Hibiki, she is in much better physical condition. Her character is a reference to the author's previous series, Kengan Ashura, being the younger sister of one of the characters appearing in the series, Shion Soryuin.
Ayaka Uehara (上原 彩也香, Uehara Ayaka)
Voiced by: Shizuka Ishigami (Japanese); Morgan Garrett (English)
A second-year high school girl who is Hibiki's best friend. Ayaka is a buff who likes watching films with Hibiki. Both she and her sister are daughters of a famous former pro boxer who founded his own gym called the Glory Gym. Because her father taught both of them how to box since their younger days, she is in excellent physical condition and is a capable boxer who coaches for their gym. Her training is such that she can do shadow boxing perfectly and even perform the infamous "Dragon Flag", known for extreme difficulties.
Gina Boyd (Note: Russian: Зина Войд, romanized: Zina Voyd) (Note: Depending on the source, her name can be translated as "Gina Boyd", "Zina Boyd", or "Zina Void". The manga refers to her as Zina Void, while the anime refers to her as Gina Boyd.) (ジーナ・ボイド, Jīna Boido)
Voiced by: Nao Tōyama (Japanese); Alexis Tipton (English)
A member of Silverman Gym's Moscow branch. After losing to Hibiki in arm wrestling, she declares herself her rival and moves to Japan, even transferring to Hibiki's school and staying at her house without permission. While not into strength training, she practices sambo and manages to stay fit that way. She tries to maintain an image of a typical Russian stereotype, but is really just an otaku. She was the first person to figure out Satomi's secret cosplaying life. Like Akemi, she is directly related to a character from Kengan Ashura; namely, she is the niece of minor character Ivan Karaev.
Satomi Tachibana (立花 里美, Tachibana Satomi)
Voiced by: Yui Horie (Japanese); Leah Clark (English)
The history teacher at Koyo Women's Academy, which Hibiki and the other girls attend. She is secretly a famous cosplayer—alias Yuria Riko—and joins Silverman Gym to maintain her figure for her con-going. Like Hibiki, she develops a crush on Machio. Gina is one of the few people who knows about Satomi's secret double life as a cosplayer, as she is a fan of Yuria.
Naruzo Machio (街雄 鳴造, Machio Naruzō)
Voiced by: Kaito Ishikawa (Japanese); Stephen Fu (English)
A trainer at the Silverman Gym who regularly coaches Hibiki and Akemi. Hibiki develops a crush on him at first sight, which becomes her primary motivation to join the gym. He is a dedicated, kindhearted and polite professional who always earnestly helps and supports Hibiki. Although belying his charming demeanor and handsome profile, Machio is deceptively muscular. While Machio looks no different than a regular young man with his clothes on, he has such a large and well-defined physique that once he flexes his muscles, he reveals a muscle mass so large he literally rips his clothes, which contrasts with his baby face. It is revealed that he was a classmate of Hibiki's brother and Ayaka's sister, and a disciple of Harnold Dogegenchonegger.

=== Supporting characters ===
Harnold Dogegenchonegger (Note: The English dub refers to Harnold Dogegenchonegger as Barnold Shortsinator.) (ハーンノルド・ドゲゲンチョネッガー, Hānnorudo Dogegenchoneggā)
Voiced by: Tesshō Genda (Japanese); Cris George (English)
An American movie star whom Hibiki and Ayaka are huge fans of. He is also Machio's mentor. He is a parody of Arnold Schwarzenegger.
Nana Uehara (上原 ナナ, Uehara Nana)
Voiced by: Rina Satō^{Ep. 2 credits} (Japanese); Molly Searcy (English)
Ayaka's older sister. She works as a boxing coach at the Glory Gym.
Rumika Aina (愛菜 るみか, Aina Rumika)
Voiced by: Haruka Tomatsu (Japanese); Jessica Cavanagh (English)
Hibiki and Ayaka's homeroom teacher. Like Satomi, she is also secretly a cosplayer.
Yakusha Kure (呉 夜叉, Kure Yakusha)
Voiced by: Sayaka Ohara (Japanese); Natalie Hoover (English)
Akemi and Gina's homeroom teacher, who is in excellent physical condition for someone her age and dislikes being called old. Her character is a reference to the author's previous series, Kengan Ashura, hailing from the Kure Clan, a notorious family of assassins, and being the mother of one of the characters, Kure Karura.
Kutaro Deire (出入 苦多朗, Deire Kutarō)
Voiced by: Hiroyuki Yoshino (Japanese); Christopher Bevins (English)
A man who works as a director for a TV station.
Jason Sgatham (ジェイソン・スゲエサム, Jeison Sugeesamu)
Voiced by: Yuichi Nakamura (Japanese); Ray Hurd (English)
Harnold Dogegenchonegger's secretary. He is a parody of Jason Statham.

== Media ==
=== Manga ===
Written by Yabako Sandrovich and illustrated by MAAM, How Heavy Are the Dumbbells You Lift? started its serialization on Shogakukan's Ura Sunday website and MangaONE app on August 5, 2016. The series is set in the same universe as Sandrovich's other work Kengan Ashura, The manga went on hiatus in October 2023 and resumed in August 2024. Shogakukan has compiled its chapters into individual tankōbon volumes. The first volume was published on December 19, 2016. As of August 19, 2024, twenty volumes have been published. In North America, Seven Seas Entertainment announced the acquisition of the manga for an English release in April 2019. The first volume was published on November 26, 2019.

=== Anime ===
An anime television series adaptation was announced on January 15, 2019. The series was produced by Doga Kobo and directed by Mitsue Yamazaki, with Fumihiko Shimo handling the series composition, Ai Kikuchi designing the characters, and Yukari Hashimoto composing the music. It aired from July 3 to September 18, 2019, on AT-X, Tokyo MX, KBS, SUN, and other channels. It ran for 12 episodes. The opening theme is "Onegai Muscle" (お願いマッスル) performed by Hibiki Sakura (Fairouz Ai) and Naruzo Machio (Kaito Ishikawa), while the ending theme is "Macho A Name?" (マッチョアネーム？) performed by Machio (Ishikawa).

Funimation licensed the series outside Asia. Following Sony's acquisition of Crunchyroll, the series was moved to Crunchyroll. Medialink holds the license for the series in Southeast Asia.

==== Episodes ====
No.	Title (Note: All English titles are taken from Funimation.)	Original release date
1	"Why Don't You Try Strength Training?"; Transliteration: "Kintore Yatte Miru?" (Japanese: 筋トレやってみる？)	July 3, 2019
Hibiki Sakura and Ayaka Uehara are walking home from Koyo Women's Academy when Ayaka notices that Hibiki has gained weight and suggests that she should go on a diet. A week later, Hibiki heads to the Silverman Gym, where she notices that Akemi Soryuin, a schoolmate, wants to join too. They look at one of the training rooms and notice that all of the members are buff, which causes Akemi to instantly join. When Naruzo Machio, one of the trainers, introduces himself to Hibiki, she joins as well. The next day, Machio instructs them to try the bench press. When Hibiki goes to relax, Machio comforts her. Suddenly, he poses and she notices that he has a buffed up figure. At school, Hibiki is sore from the gym and Ayaka notices that Hibiki is still gaining weight. Later, Machio instructs Hibiki to try doing squats. After training, Akemi notices that Hibiki likes to eat. When Hibiki reveals how much she eats per day, Akemi states how amazing Hibiki is and how she want them to become strong and macho together.
2	"Why Don't You Have Some Protein?"; Transliteration: "Purotein Totte Miru?" (Japanese: プロテイン摂ってみる？)	July 10, 2019
At the gym, Hibiki weighs herself and notices that she still gained weight. When she asks Machio for advice to lose weight, Akemi tells Hibiki to try the Lat Pulldown Machine. After using it, they visit the gym's bar and Akemi offers Hibiki more protein. The next day, Akemi convinces Hibiki to go to the swimming pool to get some exercise. Later at Ayaka's house, Hibiki and Ayaka are watching a movie. Just as they are about watch more movies, Ayaka's sister, Nana, asks her to help her out and bring Hibiki along too. To Hibiki's surprise, she finds out that Ayaka's family owns a boxing gym called the Glory Gym. Nana reveals that their dad taught them how to box. When Ayaka stops to rest for a moment, Hibiki notices her physique and asks about how she works out. Ayaka tells her about some of the exercises that she does. Afterward, Nana suggests that Hibiki should try the punching bag. When she punches it, the bag breaks.
3	"Sensei's on a Diet, Too?"; Transliteration: "Sensei mo Daietto Suru?" (Japanese: 先生もダイエットする？)	July 17, 2019
Satomi Tachibana and Rumika Aina are teachers at Koyo Women's Academy and Satomi thinks she has gained weight. Rumika gives her a pamphlet to try the Silverman Gym. When Satomi arrives at the gym, she notices that Hibiki and Akemi are there as well. Machio introduces himself to Satomi and instructs her to use the dumbbell. During the training, Satomi becomes very nervous when Akemi notices that she has a tan on her stomach. It is later revealed that Satomi is a famous cosplayer. At school, Hibiki, Akemi, and Ayaka are having lunch. Here, Ayaka finds out that Hibiki and Akemi are working out at the same gym. When they comment about their bentos, Akemi convinces Hibiki to try a certain diet. At an event, Satomi is cosplaying until she sees Hibiki and Akemi. However, they do not notice her as they spot Machio cosplaying at the event as well. As such, many of the photographers focus their attention on Machio instead. Later that night at her house, Satomi still wonders who Machio was cosplaying as and is confused why he is known as the "Muscle King".
4	"Did You Have a Nice Summer?"; Transliteration: "Natsuyasumi Ii Koto Atta?" (Japanese: 夏休みいい事あった？)	July 24, 2019
When Hibiki arrives at the Silverman Gym, she notices that Akemi is staring at the training room. Machio explains to them that during prime time, there is an influx of regular and new members working out. Machio instructs Hibiki and Akemi to try the chest press. When prime time ends, Ayaka unexpectedly shows up, revealing that the Glory Gym is taking in newer members and the Silverman Gym asked her to teach boxing. The next day, when the trio wants to work out, Akemi suggests that they go to her house. When they arrive at her mansion, Akemi goes to find a training manual. Ayaka wants to try an exercise from the manual by using chairs. Later, Hibiki attempts to do an enhanced version of the exercise, but she inadvertently breaks the chairs and ends up apologizing to Akemi. For the rest of summer break, the girls decide to go to the beach. However, they see a sign that forbids swimming due to sharks. Akemi suggests that they should try the Burpee. This is then followed by Ayaka suggesting that they go sprinting.
5	"What's Your Sports Day Event?"; Transliteration: "Taiikusai Nani ni Deru?" (Japanese: 体育祭何に出る？)	July 31, 2019
At school, Rumika tells the class to choose the event for Sports Day. The class decides on doing a 400 meter relay. At the gym, Machio suggests the girls should train their hamstrings by doing leg curls. The next day, the girls are walking to school when Hibiki complains about how sore she is due to the exercise. Later, the final event of Sports Day is the relay with Hibiki and Akemi serving as the anchors for their respective classes. While awaiting her turn, Hibiki remembers how Machio instructed her to try the Bicycle Crunch. When her turn finally comes, her classmate drops the baton. Picking it up, Hibiki continues the relay and finishes in second place behind Akemi. However, she receives the unfortunate news from Satomi that her class is disqualified because she illegally picked up the baton. At the gym, Machio gives the girls raffle tickets as a way to celebrate the Silverman Gym being open for six months. Afterward, they head to gym's sauna. While everyone is relaxing, Hibiki makes a bet to see who can stay in there the longest, which she wins. She then receives some T-shirts from the raffle.
6	"Want a New Rival?"; Transliteration: "Atarashii Raibaru Hoshii?" (Japanese: 新しいライバルほしい？)	August 7, 2019
On her way to the Silverman Gym, Hibiki sees a sale for a home theater system. At the gym, the girls see a flyer promoting an arm wrestling tournament. When Hibiki asks Machio about the tournament, he explains the rules of arm wrestling. In the first match, Hibiki easily defeats Ayaka. Machio then wins the next match when he overpowers Hibiki with his strength. On the day of the tournament, Hibiki finds out that there are only two people competing in the women's division: herself and a Russian named Gina Boyd. The match ends with her easily winning against Gina. Several days later, Gina transfers to Hibiki's school. When asked what kind of training she did, Gina reveals she mostly took Sambo classes and she does arm wrestling and kipping as well. After school, Gina tells Akemi that she cannot make to the gym because she is meeting her host family. Later that night, Hibiki discovers Gina is staying with her.
7	"Want to Be an Idol?"; Transliteration: "Aidoru ni Naritai?" (Japanese: アイドルになりたい？)	August 14, 2019
At school, Gina reveals she watched anime and Jackie Chan movies in order to learn the Japanese language and understand the culture. After school, Gina is shocked to find out that the gym is closed for the day. Hibiki decides to invite Akemi, Ayaka, and Gina to her job. Once they arrive there, she reveals that she works at her brother's yakiniku restaurant. After her break is over with, Hibiki complains about her gym and food expenses. Akemi then tells her that she can ask the school to cover her gym expenses since her sister is the chairman. The next day, Satomi is teaching the class when Gina realizes that she is the famous cosplayer Yuria Riko. Later that day, Gina hangs out with Satomi and suggests that they jog to Akihabara. When Satomi asks Gina why she wants to go there, she reveals that she wants to form an idol group. At an idol audition, Kutaro Deire, the director, complains until the girls show up. Despite the fact that they have captivated the audience, which includes a moment where Satomi does a deadlift, they do not make the cut.
8	"What If We Get Lost?"; Transliteration: "Sōnan Shitara Dōsuru?" (Japanese: 遭難したらどうする？)	August 21, 2019
When Satomi leaves the teacher's lounge, Rumika and Yakusha wonder why Satomi has been so busy lately until Rumika sees her Silverman Gym card. They then head to the gym where they meet Satomi and their students. Machio introduces himself to them and instructs everyone to try the side bend. Afterwards, Rumika and Yakusha head home. In November, the second-year students are on a field trip where they are hiking up a mountain. During the hike, Yakusha explains the proper technique and exercise for hiking. However, Hibiki, Satomi, and Rumika end up falling behind the group. As a result, they take the wrong trail, causing them to freak out. Once they calm down, Satomi notices a tree and explains how to do tree and rope climbing. As they are climbing the tree, Yakusha realizes that they went to the athletic corner of the mountain. Meanwhile, a mysterious man tells his secretary to book a trip to Japan.
9	"Have You Seen God Before?"; Transliteration: "Kami o Mita Koto Aru?" (Japanese: 神を見たことある？)	August 28, 2019
Arriving in Japan, the mysterious man tells his secretary that he is heading off. Meanwhile at the Silverman Gym, Machio instructs the girls to try to do back extensions. Just then, the mysterious man arrives, who is revealed to be the famous movie star Harnold Dogegenchonegger. When asks about how he knows Harnold, Machio reveals that Harnold was his mentor while he was studying in America. Harnold tells Machio that he had recently found his location. After Machio crushes a hand grip, Harnold invites him to a bodybuilding competition. The next day, the girls arrive at the bodybuilding competition where Harnold escorts them to the VIP section. There, he explains the rules of the competition. When it is Machio's turn, he does a pose that is so powerful it causes the other competitors to concede defeat. Congratulating Machio on his victory, Harnold reveals that the competition was a test and he invites Machio to compete against him in Las Vegas. Machio tells him that he is not sure he can make it due to his job. At the gym, Harnold's secretary, Jason Sgatham, introduces himself to everybody and reveals that he is staying in Japan.
10	"Do You Like Christmas?"; Transliteration: "Kurisumasu wa Osuki?" (Japanese: クリスマスはお好き？)	September 4, 2019
The girls are hanging out together during Christmastime. However, they become despondent when they realize that they do not have boyfriends. At the gym, Machio and Satomi try to cheer them up to no avail. Machio then tells everyone that a Christmas party will be held at the gym. While they are training, he instructs them to try to do some skull crushers. At the Christmas party, the girls are enjoying themselves when Machio announces that the grand prize winner of the raffle contest will receive two tickets to Tochigi Destinyland. While Machio is posing, Akemi explains that it is actually a type of training. Afterwards, it is revealed that Satomi won. However, she cannot go because she is too busy, and she gives the tickets to Akemi. When asked, Akemi reveals that she is going with Machio. At Tochigi Destinyland, the girls follow Akemi and Machio around. When Hibiki and Gina catch up with them, Akemi and Machio reveal that they are entering a cosplay event. He also takes the time to talk about the incline bench press. Meanwhile, a separated Satomi runs into Rumika while both of them are in cosplay, much to their chagrin.
11	"How Are You Spending New Year's?"; Transliteration: "O Shōgatsu Nani Shiteru?" (Japanese: お正月何してる？)	September 11, 2019
On New Year's Eve, Hibiki and Gina are home when Akemi and Ayaka show up. Meanwhile, Satomi and Rumika are having a drinking party at Satomi's house. Walking around, the girls decide to head to a shrine. When they arrive, Akemi reveals that the muscle god is worshiped at the shrine. Ayaka then explains the exercise of stair climbing. When they reach the top, they find out that Machio's family owns the shrine and he works as a priest during the holiday. The next day, the girls are hanging out. When they arrive at a park to do a street workout, Akemi sifts through her training manual and they decide to do an isometrics workout. Later, Gina proposes that they enter a hidden talent show. At the talent show, Kutaro complains when the girls show up. Satomi does a wrestler's bridge while Ayaka sits on her. To his surprise, Kutaro learns that the talent show was a ratings success thanks to the girls. As he is heading out, Kutaro runs into Jason, who hands him a flyer promoting a trip that is being organized by the Silverman Gym.
12	"How Heavy Are the Barbells You Lift?"; Transliteration: "Bāberu Nan-Kiro Moteru?" (Japanese: バーベル何キロ持てる？)	September 18, 2019
At the Silverman Gym, Machio tells Hibiki and Akemi that the gym is organizing a trip to Nikunoshima for spring break. He also reveals that excluding Jason, everyone will be going as well. Meanwhile, it is revealed that Jason and Kutaro has the gym under surveillance. Arriving at Nikunoshima, the group is enjoying themselves. Machio then arrives with a melon. Deciding to have a melon bash, Machio explains the shrug exercise. Afterward, the girls enter the Miss Nikunoshima contest. During the contest, Akemi does handstand push-ups. While she is doing this, Machio takes the time to explain push-ups. When it is Hibiki's turn, she displays her punching power. When it is revealed that they are tied in first place, they compete in a bench press battle, which Akemi wins. Later, it is revealed that Jason and Kutaro are stranded at sea. At the beach, Hibiki and Akemi talk about how much they have grown thanks to their training. Just then, they spot something heading their way. Harnold meets with everyone and reveals that he rescued Jason and Kutaro. Afterward, Hibiki weighs herself. Once she sees the results, she leaves in an elated mood.

== Reception ==
In 2019, the manga was nominated for the 65th Shogakukan Manga Award for the shōnen category.

Gadget Tsūshin listed lines from the opening theme and the training video in their 2019 anime buzzwords list.

The anime series was nominated for Best Boy for Naruzo Machio and Best Comedy at the 4th Crunchyroll Anime Awards, but lost to Tanjiro Kamado from Demon Slayer: Kimetsu no Yaiba and Kaguya-sama: Love Is War, respectively.
