= List of Days chapters =

Written and illustrated by Tsuyoshi Yasuda, Days was serialized in Kodansha's Weekly Shōnen Magazine from April 24, 2013, to January 20, 2021. Kodansha collected its chapters in forty-two tankōbon volumes, released from July 17, 2013, to March 17, 2021.

Kodansha USA publishes the manga in a digital-only format since April 25, 2017.

== Days volume list ==
No.	Original release date	Original ISBN	English release date	English ISBN
1	July 17, 2013	978-4-06-384898-4	April 25, 2017	978-1-68-233684-7
1st day "Earth and Wind" (土と風, "Tsuchi to kaze"); 2nd day "Bud" (芽吹き, "Mebuki"); 3rd day "Glimpse" (片鱗, "Henrin"); 4th day "Mother and Child" (母と子, "Haha to ko"); 5th day "Member" (一員, "Ichiin")
2	September 17, 2013	978-4-06-394933-9	May 16, 2017	978-1-68-233696-0
6th day "Special" (特別, "Tokubetsu"); 7th day "Training Camp (1)" (合宿1, "Gasshuku 1"); 8th day "Training Camp (2)" (合宿2, "Gasshuku 2"); 9th day "Training Camp (3)" (合宿3, "Gasshuku 3"); 10th day "Training Camp (4)" (合宿4, "Gasshuku 4"); 11th day "Guts" (根性, "Konjō"); 12th day "#17" (17番, "17 ban"); 13th day "Running" (走ること, "Hashiru koto"); 14th day "That Man" (その男, "Sono otoko")
3	November 17, 2013	978-4-06-394970-4	July 4, 2017	978-1-68-233766-0
15th day "God of Soccer" (サッカーの神様, "Sakkā no kami-sama"); 16th day "Handful of Dreams" (一握の夢, "Ichiaku no yume"); 17th day "Toward the Goal" (ゴールへの意思, "Gōru e no ishi"); 18th day "The Beast" (怪物, "Kaibutsu"); 19th day "Captain of Seiseki" (聖蹟のキャプテン, "Seiseki no kyaputen"); 20th day "Tsukushi's a Boy" (つくしは男の子, "Tsukushi wa otokonoko"); 21st day "His Philosophy" (彼の哲学, "Kare no tetsugaku"); 22nd day "You Are Here" (現在地, "Genzai chi"); 23rd day "Egotist" (成神蹴治, "Sei kami")
4	January 17, 2014	978-4-06-395001-4	August 29, 2017	978-1-68-233803-2
24th day "What Words Can't Say" (語れないこと, "Katarenai koto"); 25th day "Eating Dirt" (泥水を啜る, "Doromizu o susuru"); 26th day "Faith and Pride" (信条とプライド, "Shinjō to puraido"); 27th day "Some Heroes" (そういうヒーロー, "Sō yū hīrō"); 28th day "Together" (2人なら, "2-nin nara"); 29th day "Even If My Breath Stops" (呼吸をやめても, "Kokyū o yamete mo"); 30th day "Days" (日々, "Hibi"); 31st day "Goodbye" (別れ, "Wakare"); 32nd day "The First Team" (初めてのチーム, "Hajimete no chīmu")
5	March 17, 2014	978-4-06-395034-2	September 26, 2017	978-1-68-233863-6
33rd day "Orange Sunlight, Stretching Shadows" (赤い光、のびる影, "Akai hikari, nobiru kage"); 34th day "An Upperclassman's Job" (上級生の仕事, "Jōkyū-sei no shigoto"); 35th day "Cast Off This Smell" (皮を剥ぐ, "Kawa o hagu"); 36th day "Childhood Friend" (幼なじみ, "Osananajimi"); 37th day "Limited Spots" (限りある椅子, "Kagiri aru isu"); 38th day "The 10% Hero" (10%のヒーロー, "10 pāsento no hīrō"); 39th day "The Real Fight" (本当の勝負, "Hontō no shōbu"); 40th day "How Shorties Think" (チビの考え, "Chibi no kangae"); 41st day "What He Needs to Realize" (気づくべきこと, "Kizukubeki koto")
6	May 17, 2014	978-4-06-395083-0	October 31, 2017	978-1-68-233886-5
42nd day "How Defenders Think" (DFの考え方, "DF no kangae kata"); 43rd day "Someone Who Fights" (戦う人間, "Tatakau ningen"); 44th day "Sacrifice" (サクリファイス, "Sakurifaisu"); 45th day "The Night Before" (それぞれの前夜, "Sorezore no zen'ya"); 46th day "Seiseki and Seikan" (聖蹟と青函, "Seiseki to Seikan"); 47th day "Faith" (信頼, "Shinrai"); 48th day "The Prodigy's Proof" (天才の証明, "Tensai no shōmei"); 49th day "Estrangement" (遠ざかる, "Tōzakaru"); 50th day "Rift" (亀裂, "Kiretsu")
7	July 17, 2014	978-4-06-395129-5	December 26, 2017	978-1-64-212008-0
51st day "Taira and Hiruma" (平と火村, "Taira to Himura"); 52nd day "A Hand That Fell Short" (届かない手, "Todokanai te"); 53rd day "Sure of These Feelings" (たしかな気持ち, "Tashika na kimochi"); 54th day "Deep Sea" (深海, "Shinkai"); 55th day "Forgiveness and Vow" (赦しと誓い, "Yurushi to chikai"); 56th day "Survival" (サバイバル, "Sabaibaru"); 57th day "Every Single Corner" (ひとつひとつ, "Hito-tsu hito-tsu"); 58th day "Somewhere Between Calm and Frantic" (冷静と情熱の間, "Reisei to jōnetsu no aida"); 59th day "Above and Beyond in the Rain" (雨と上出来, "Ame to jōdeki")
8	September 17, 2014	978-4-06-395201-8	April 17, 2018	978-1-64-212183-4
60th day "Arrow" (一矢, "Isshi"); 61st day "Somewhere Along the Line" (三日会わざれば, "Mikka awazare ba"); 62nd day "Bad Boy" (悪童, "Akudō"); 63rd day "Setting the Curve" (曲線を描く, "Kyokusen o egaku"); 64th day "Four Third-Years" (4人の3年, "4-nin no 3 nen"); 65th day "Three Chances" (3つのチャンス, "3-tsu no chansu"); 66th day "What Ten Years Meant" (10年間の意味, "10 nenkan no imi"); 67th day "None of You Know" (あんたたちも知らない, "Anta-tachi mo shiranai"); 68th day "Two and Nine" (2人と9人, "2-nin to 9-nin")
9	December 17, 2014	978-4-06-395267-4	August 21, 2018	978-1-64-212422-4
69th day "What You Gave Me" (預かったもの, "Azukatta mono"); 70th day "Crawling in the Dirt" (地を這う, "Chi o hau"); 71st day "One Weed to Another" (雑草たち, "Zassō-tachi"); 72nd day "Split-Second Victory" (ひとときの勝利, "Hitotoki no shōri"); 73rd day "Instinct" (それぞれの本能, "Sorezore no honnō"); 74th day "Beautiful Dance" (美しく舞う, "Utsukushiku mau"); 75th day "Weed in Astroturf" (人工芝の中の雑草, "Jinkō shiba no naka no zassō"); 76th day "Renewed Will" (新たな決意, "Arata na ketsui"); 77th day "The Fourth Man" (第4の男, "Dai 4 no otoko")
10	February 17, 2015	978-4-06-395319-0	October 16, 2018	978-1-64-212507-8
78th day "Her Fighting Spirit" (彼女の闘志, "Kanojo no tōshi"); 79th day "Before the Finals" (決戦の前, "Kessen no mae"); 80th day "The Power of Words" (言霊, "Kotodama"); 81st day "Greed" (欲張り, "Yokubari"); 82nd day "Reigning Champions, Old Dominators" (王者と名門, "Ōja to meimon"); 83rd day "Growth" (その先の進化, "Sono saki no shinka"); 84th day "The Left Side" (左サイド, "Hidari saido"); 85th day "I Won't Settle for Less" (決めていること, "Kimete iru koto"); 86th day "Incarnate" (体現者, "Taigen-sha")
11	April 17, 2015	978-4-06-395378-7	December 18, 2018	978-1-64-212574-0
87th day "Sign" (サイン, "Sain"); 88th day "Guardian Angels" (守護神たち, "Shugo kami-tachi"); 89th day "The Untold Story of the Beast" (怪物秘話, "Kaibutsu hiwa"); 90th day "A Forgiving Man" (許す男, "Yurusu otoko"); 91st day "The King Evolves" (王の進化, "Ō no shinka"); 92nd day "The Case Against Crowns" (冠不要論, "Kan fuyō ron"); 93rd day "2=12"; 94th day "Footsteps" (足音, "Ashioto"); 95th day "Your Game" (お前のやり方, "Omae no yari kata"); 96th day "Beacon" (狼煙, "Noroshi")
12	July 17, 2015	978-4-06-395434-0	February 19, 2019	978-1-64-212637-2
97th day "Candidate" (当選者, "Tōsen-sha"); 98th day "Distant Promise" (遠い約束, "Tōi yakusoku"); 99th day "Hoshina and Kaido" (保科と海藤, "Hoshina to Kaidō"); 100th day "It Won't Be That Easy" (頂は見えず, "Itadaki wa miezu"); 101st day "Hope and Despair" (希望と絶望, "Kibō to zetsubō"); 102nd day "Joker" (JOKER, "Joker"); 103rd day "100 Points" (100点, "100 ten"); 104th day "The Rain That Never Let Up" (雨は止まず, "Ame wa yamazu"); 105th day "The Narrow Gate" (狭き門, "Semaki mon"); 106th day "DAYS" (デイズ, "Deizu")
13	September 17, 2015	978-4-06-395494-4	April 16, 2019	978-1-64-212700-3
107th day "One Hardheaded Second" (愚鈍の一秒, "Gudon no ichi byō"); 108th day "Captain" (キャプテン, "Kyaputen"); 109th day "Victory" (頂, "Itadaki"); 110th day "You Made It" (通ったんだ, "Tōtta n da"); 111th day "Jubilation" (宴, "En"); 112th day "Warriors" (猛者ども, "Mosa-domo"); 113th day "Father, Mother, and Child" (父と母と子と, "Chichi to haha to ko to"); 114th day "Seiseki Festival" (聖蹟祭, "Seiseki-sai"); 115th day "Road to Brilliance" (天才への道程, "Tensai e no dōtei")
14	November 17, 2015	978-4-06-395536-1	June 18, 2019	978-1-64-212916-8
116th day "Animal Instinct" (野生の勘, "Yasei no kan"); 117th day "Reversal" (下剋上, "Gekokujō"); 118th day "No Pain, No Gain" (努力も挫折もなく, "Doryoku mo zasetsu mo naku"); 119th day "The Difference between Us" (俺との違い, "Ore to no chigai"); 120th day "How Leaders are Meant to Be" (支配者の理想, "Shihai-sha no risō"); 121st day "Forged Over Time" (積み上げた武器, "Tsumiageta buki"); 122nd day "The Morning They Left" (出発の朝, "Shuppatsu no asa"); 123rd day "A Player's Oath" (選手宣誓, "Senshu sensei"); 124th day "A Vacuum to Fill" (空白の流れるピッチで, "Kūhaku no nagareru picchi de")
15	January 15, 2016	978-4-06-395583-5	November 26, 2019	978-1-64-659136-7
125th day "Pulsing, but Passive" (消極的躍動, "Shōkyoku-teki yakudō"); 126th day "Army Ants" (軍隊蟻, "Guntai ari"); 127th day "The Ace Up Their Sleeves" (伝家の宝刀, "Denka no hōtō"); 128th day "Ready to Charge Ahead" (前へと進む覚悟, "Mae e to susumu kakugo"); 129th day "A Stubborn Amatour" (しがみつく凡才, "Shigamitsuku bonsai"); 130th day "In Your Eyes" (お前の目に映るもの, "Omae no me ni utsuru mono"); 131st day "All-Out Attack" (徹底的攻撃陣形, "Tettei-teki kōgeki jinkei"); 132nd day "The Heart of Battle" (勝負が宿す体温, "Shōbu ga yadosu taion"); 133rd day "Blooming in Ten Days" (10日後の葉牡丹, "10-ka-go no ha botan")
16	April 15, 2016	978-4-06-395649-8	January 28, 2020	978-1-64-659216-6
134th day "Slugfest" (殴り合い, "Naguriai"); 135th day "Cation: Highly Flammable" (発火注意報, "Hakka chūi-hō"); 136th day "One of a Kind" (唯一無二の存在, "Yuiitsu muni no sonzai"); 137th day "Dancing on the Pitch" (ピッチに舞う, "Picchi ni mau"); 138th day "Duotheism" (二神論, "Ni shinron"); 139th day "The Nucleus, Unseen" (見えざる核, "Miezaru kaku"); 140th day "17 Years" (17年, "17 nen"); 141st day "Up and Running" (稼働, "Kadō"); 142nd day "Overwhelming Talent" (圧倒的才能, "Attō-teki sainō")
17	June 17, 2016	978-4-06-395691-7	March 24, 2020	978-1-64-659265-4
143rd day "The Temple Guardians" (仁王, "Niō"); 144th day "Credentials on Display" (掲げる資格, "Kakageru shikaku"); 145th day "The Reaper's Footprints" (死神の足跡, "Shinigami no ashiato"); 146th day "Leading in Silence" (無言の背中, "Mugon no senaka"); 147th day "Simple" (シンプル, "Shinpuru"); 148th day "Undivided" (離さずに, "Hanasazu ni"); 149th day "All for One" (all for one, "All for One"); 150th day "The Boy's Next Step" (進化する少年, "Shinka suru shōnen"); 151st day "Run" (ラン, "Ran")
18	August 17, 2016	978-4-06-395733-4; 978-4-06-358837-8 (LE)	May 26, 2020	978-1-64-659370-5
152nd day "Resolve" (それぞれの決意, "Sorezore no ketsui"); 153rd day "Proof of Friendship" (仲間の証明, "Nakama no shōmei"); 154th day "Gift" (ギフト, "Gifuto"); 155th day "Have-Nots" (持たざる者, "Motazaru mono"); 156th day "Limit" (限界領域, "Genkai ryōiki"); 157th day "All for This Moment" (この瞬間のために, "Kono shunkan no tame ni"); 158th day "Work in Progress" (進化の途中, "Shinka no tochū"); 159th day "Flash of Gallantry" (剛撃一閃, "Tsuyoshi-geki issen"); 160th day "Plan" (シナリオ, "Shinario")
19	October 17, 2016	978-4-06-395780-8	July 28, 2020	978-1-64-659604-1
161st day "Hero for a Day" (主役になる日, "Shuyaku ni naru hi"); 162nd day "We All Won Together" (全員の勝利, "Zen'in no shōri"); 163rd day "Doubt" (疑問, "Gimon"); 164th day "Rejection" (拒絶, "Kyozetsu"); 165th day "A Better Coach" (最高の采配, "Saikō no saihai"); 166th day "No Position" (立場, "Tachiba"); 167th day "Calpico Time" (カルピスの時間, "Karupisu no jikan"); 168th day "Sympathetic Vibration" (共鳴, "Kyōmei"); 169th day "As a Matter of Course" (当たり前のように, "Atarimae no yō ni")
20	January 17, 2017	978-4-06-395852-2	September 22, 2020	978-1-64-659705-5
170th day "Like Coughing Up Blood" (血を吐くように, "Chi o haku yō ni"); 171st day "Stifle" (押し殺して, "Oshikoroshite"); 172nd day "Decisive Morning" (決意の朝, "Ketsui no asa"); 173rd day "Worldview" (世界の見え方, "Sekai no mie kata"); 174th day "Juggling" (リフティング, "Rifutingu"); 175th day "Trust and Respect" (信頼と尊敬, "Shinrai to sonkei"); 176th day "Declaration of War" (宣戦布告, "Sensen fukoku"); 177th day "Kickoff" (キックオフ, "Kikkuofu"); 178th day "Rush" (アグレッシブ, "Aguresshibu")
21	March 17, 2017	978-4-06-395893-5; 978-4-06-397016-6 (LE)	December 22, 2020	978-1-64-659874-8
179th day "Main Cast" (メインキャスト, "Mein kyasuto"); 180th day "Signs of Progress" (進化のサイン, "Shinka no sain"); 181st day "Communication" (コミュニケーション, "Komyunikeishon"); 182nd day "Left Foot of God" (神の左, "Kami no hidari"); 183rd day "A Whole Other Meaning" (もう一つの意味, "Mō hito-tsu no imi"); 184th day "Nonstop" (ノンストップ, "Nonsutoppu"); 185th day "No Time for Breakdowns" (折れてる暇はない, "Oreteru hima wa nai"); 186th day "The Tree-Tower Fortress" (三重の砦, "Mie no toride"); 187th day "Bystander" (傍観者, "Bōkan-sha")
22	May 16, 2017	978-4-06-395893-5; 978-4-06-397017-3 (LE)	February 23, 2021	978-1-64-659970-7
188th day "King" ("王", "Ō"); 189th day "Returning the Favor" (恩返し, "Ongaeshi"); 190th day "Captaincy Takes All Kinds" (それぞれのキャプテンシー, "Sorezore no kyaputen shī"); 191st day "The Champion at the Touch Line" (ライン際の覇者, "Rain sai no hasha"); 192nd day "Flesh and Blood" (血と肉, "Chi to niku"); 193rd day "Ace in the Hole" (隠し玉, "Kakushidama"); 194th day "The Cracks Begin to Show" (破音, "Ha on"); 195th day "Lightning Rod" (八つ当たり, "Yatsuatari"); 196th day "A Star with No Name" (名もなき星, "Na mo naki hoshi")
23	August 17, 2017	978-4-06-510115-5	April 27, 2021	978-1-63-699061-3
197th day "Plenty of Game Left" (まだここから, "Mada koko kara"); 198th day "Bus Stop" (バスストップ, "Basu sutoppu"); 199th day "Boldness and Hard Work" (勇気と努力, "Yūki to doryoku"); 200th day "Path of Defeat" (敗北の軌跡, "Haiboku no kiseki"); 201st day "The Linchpin in The Shadows" (影の大黒柱, "Kage no daikoku hashira"); 202nd day "A Sorry Excuse for a Pep Talk" (不器用のエール, "Fu kiyō no eiru"); 203rd day "How Many One-on-Ones" (1対1の数, "Ichi tai ichi no sū"); 204th day "Talent Shines" (光る才能, "Hikaru sainō"); 205th day "Contest of Coaches" (采配合戦, "Saihai kassen")
24	October 17, 2017	978-4-06-510245-9	June 22, 2021	978-1-63-699160-3
206th day "Bright Light" (光明, "Kōmyō"); 207th day "The Amateur Anthem" (凡人讃歌, "Bonjin sanka"); 208th day "Mistake" (誤算, "Gosan"); 209th day "Tenacios Winds" (執念の風, "Shūnen no kaze"); 210th day "Birth of Miracle" (奇跡の産声, "Kiseki no ubugoe"); 211th day "God and Beast" (神と怪物, "Kami to kaibutsu"); 212th day "Two Sacrifical Pawns" (2人の捨て駒, "Futari no sutegoma"); 213th day "Conditions" (発動条件, "Hatsudō jōken"); 214th day "Gegenpress" (ゲーゲンプレス, "Geigenpuresu")
25	December 15, 2017	978-4-06-510549-8	August 24, 2021	978-1-63-699306-5
215th day "Light" (光, "Hikari"); 216th day "Determination" (決意, "Ketsui"); 217th day "Payback" (恩返し, "Ongaeshi"); 218th day "Trust" (託された者, "Takusareta mono"); 219th day "Make Some Noise" (もっと声を, "Motto koe o"); 220th day "Giants Shoulder to Shoulder" (才気、並び立つ, "Saiki, narabitatsu"); 221st day "I Told You" (お前に言った, "Omae ni itta"); 222nd day "Who Are You?" (何者？, "Nanimono?"); 223rd day "Pride of the Have-Nots" (持たざる者の誇り, "Motazaru mono no hokori")
26	March 16, 2018	978-4-06-511074-4	October 26, 2021	978-1-63-699423-9
224th day "Represent" (仲間の代表, "Nakama no daihyō"); 225th day "What Needs to Be Done" (するべきこと, "Surubeki koto"); 226th day "Blessed" (備える人, "Sonaeru hito"); 227th day "Separate Ways" (それぞれの道, "Sorezore no dō"); 228th day "Reason" (その理由, "Sono riyū"); 229th day "Foundation" (土台, "Dodai"); 230th day "The Promise We Made" (あの日の約束, "Ano hi no yakusoku"); 231st day "As Long as You've Got Me" (俺がいる限り, "Ore ga iru kagiri"); 232nd day "Discord" (不協和音, "Fukyō waon")
27	May 17, 2018	978-4-06-511414-8; 978-4-06-510692-1 (LE)	December 28, 2021	978-1-63-699532-8
233rd day "Oath" (決意の宣誓, "Ketsui no sensei"); 234th day "Powerful Curse" (大いなる呪い, "Ōinaru noroi"); 235th day "Burden of the Chosen" (選ばれし者の重責, "Erabare shi mono no jūseki"); 236th day "Proof" (ある証明, "Aru shōmei"); 237th day "No Man's Land"; 238th day "What I Couldn't Say" (言えなかったこと, "Ienakatta koto"); 239th day "Waves on the Wind" (風を運ぶ波, "Kaze o hakobu nami"); 240th day "I Looked Back, and There You Where" (振り向けば君が, "Furimuke ba kimi ga"); 241st day "Wind and Earth" (風と土, "Kaze to do")
28	July 17, 2018	978-4-06-511797-2; 978-4-06-510693-8 (LE)	March 22, 2022	978-1-63-699667-7
242nd day "The Final Moments" (最後の瞬間, "Saigo no shunkan"); 243rd day "Cheers for the Victors" (喝采を君に, "Kassai o kimi ni"); 244th day "The Long Walk of the Defeated" (敗れ往く者, "Yabureyuku mono"); 245th day "Boasts and Blessings" (自慢と祝福, "Jiman to shukufuku"); 246th day "My Circumstances" (私の事情, "Watakushi no jijō"); 247th day "Where the Road Not Chosen Leads" (選ばなかった道の先, "Erabanakatta michi no saki"); 248th day "Another Battle" (もう一つの戦い, "Mō hito-tsu no tatakai"); 249th day "Hearsay" (下馬評, "Geba hyō"); 250th day "Operation: DS" (SF作戦, "SF sakusen")
29	September 14, 2018	978-4-06-512602-8	May 24, 2022	978-1-68-491184-4
251st day "A Slight Gap" (小さなズレ, "Chīsana zure"); 252nd day "Change of Pace" (チェンジ・オブ・ペース, "Chenji obu peisu"); 253rd day "New Wings" (新たな翼, "Arata na tsubasa"); 254th day "Promises" (あの日の約束, "Ano hi no yakusoku"); 255th day "Forwards Are Dogs" (FWは犬, "FW wa inu"); 256th day "Over the Wall" (壁を越えて, "Kabe o koete"); 257th day "Deadly Venom" (猛毒, "Mōdoku"); 258th day "With Head Held High" (胸を張って, "Mune o hatte"); 259th day "It's Been Great" (これまでで最高, "Kore made de saikō")
30	November 16, 2018	978-4-06-513247-0	July 26, 2022	978-1-68-491367-1
260th day "Hybrid" (ハイブリッド, "Haiburiddo"); 261st day "Comedy" (喜劇, "Kigeki"); 262nd day "Ultimate Showdown" (最強対決, "Saikyō taiketsu"); 263rd day "Jeers and Sneers" (ブーイング, "Būingu"); 264th day "Responsibility" (責任, "Sekinin"); 265th day "What Makes an Ace?" (エースとは？, "Eisu to wa?"); 266th day "The Lonely Youth" (一人ぼっちの少年, "Hitoribocchi no shōnen"); 267th day "Staredown" (睨み合い, "Niramiai"); 268th day "One Loss and it's Over" (負けたら終わり, "Maketara owari")
31	February 15, 2019	978-4-06-513873-1	September 27, 2022	978-1-68-491456-2
269th day "My Task" (俺の仕事, "Ore no shigoto"); 270th day "Three Years of Training" (3年間の修練, "3 nenkan no shūren"); 271st day "The Face of Death" (死神の素顔, "Shinigami no sugao"); 272nd day "Their True Form" (真の姿, "Shin no sugata"); 273rd day "Two Kinds of Dribbling" (2つのドリブル, "2-tsu no doriburu"); 274th day "Alive"; 275th day "Beyond Resolve" (覚悟の上, "Kakugo no ue"); 276th day "What Cannot Be Repaid" (返せぬままに, "Kaesenu mama ni"); 277th day "On the Pitch Once More" (またピッチで, "Mata picchi de")
32	April 17, 2019	978-4-06-514880-8	November 22, 2022	978-1-68-491552-1
278th day "The Man Called Genichiro Taira" (平源一郎という男, "Taira Gen'ichirō to yū otoko"); 279th day "Normal Lives for the Victors" (勝ち取った日常, "Kachitotta nichijō"); 280th day "Footprints" (確かな足跡, "Tashika na ashiato"); 281st day "Meaning" (意味, "Imi"); 282nd day "Sweet Spot" (スイートスポット, "Suīto supotto"); 283rd day "Ridicule" (嘲笑, "Chōshō"); 284th day "Respect" (リスペクト, "Risupekuto"); 285th day "The God of Soccer" (サッカーの神様, "Sakkā no kami-sama"); 286th day "Call of the Crow" (カラスの鳴き声, "Karasu no nakigoe")
33	June 17, 2019	978-4-06-515307-9	January 24, 2023	978-1-68-491651-1
287th day "Kimishita's Childhood Dream" (君下少年の夢, "Kimi ka shōnen no yume"); 288th day "Train Cars" (車両, "Sharyō"); 289th day "The Melancholy of Chikako Ubukata" (生方千加子の憂鬱, "Ubukata Chikako no yūutsu"); 290th day "Reality" (真実, "Shinjitsu"); 291st day "Bewilderment" (困惑, "Konwaku"); 292nd day "Give Thanks" (感謝して, "Kansha shite"); 293rd day "Without Words" (言葉にできない, "Kotoba ni dekinai"); 294th day "Feeling of the Pitch" (ピッチの感触, "Picchi no kanshoku"); 295th day "For My Friend" (友のために, "Tomo no tame ni")
34	August 16, 2019	978-4-06-516229-3	March 28, 2023	978-1-68-491858-4
296th day "Entry of the Gladiators" (選手入場, "Senshu nyūjō"); 297th day "Scrambling for Advantage" (主導権争い, "Shudō-ken arasoi"); 298th day "Memories of Battle" (激戦の記憶, "Gekisen no kioku"); 299th day "Harsh Reality" (等身大の悪足掻き, "Tōshin-dai no waruagaki"); 300st day "Battle of Wits" (化かし合い, "Bakashiai"); 301st day "Charging After" (ガン追い, "Gan oi"); 302nd day "The Base of the Sakura Tree" (桜の幹, "Sakura no miki"); 303rd day "Munchkins Stick Together" (ちびっ子コンビ, "Chibikko konbi"); 304th day "Teacher and Student" (もう一組の師, "Mō ichi kumi no shi")
35	November 15, 2019	978-4-06-517313-8	May 23, 2023	978-1-68-491942-0
305th day "Taking Advantage" (イカス男, "Ikasu otoko"); 306th day "The One-Man Show" (自作自演の男, "Jisaku jien no otoko"); 307th day "Impressive" (震える魂, "Furueru tamashī"); 308th day "Unchanging Origins" (変わらぬ原点, "Kawaranu genten"); 309th day "Drawing In" (吸い寄せる男, "Suiyoseru otoko"); 310th day "Extradimensional Skill" (異次元スキル, "I jigen sukiru"); 311th day "Fool's Paradise" (バカの楽園, "Baka no rakuen"); 312th day "Father and Son" (父と子, "Chichi to ko"); 313th day "A Bouquet For You" (花束を君に, "Hanataba o kimi ni")
36	January 17, 2020	978-4-06-517884-3	July 25, 2023	979-8-88-933045-5
314th day "Post-Goal Celebration" (ゴール後の祝祭, "Gōru-go no shukusai"); 315th day "Three Minutes" (3分後, "3 fun-go"); 316th day "The Ace Arrives" (エース投入, "Eisu tōnyū"); 317th day "Confrontation" (対峙, "Taiji"); 318th day "The Gamble" (ギャンブル, "Gyanburu"); 319th day "The Turning Point" (潮目, "Shiome"); 320th day "An Underdog Story" (逆転の歴史, "Gyakuten no rekishi"); 321st day "The Underrated" (過小評価の男, "Kashō hyōka no otoko"); 322nd day "The Next Leader" (未来のリーダー, "Mirai no rīdā")
37	March 17, 2020	978-4-06-518516-2	October 10, 2023	979-8-88-933153-7
323rd day "Make Him Shine" (生かし方, "Ikashi kata"); 324th day "What They Don't Know" (知られざる物語, "Shirarezaru monogatari"); 325th day "Overcoming Hardship" (苦しみを越えて, "Kurushimi o koete"); 326th day "Song of Celebration" (歓喜の歌, "Kanki no uta"); 327th day "Song of Celebration" (聖蹟の魂, "Seiseki no tamashī"); 328th day "Burden" (背負う者, "Seou mono"); 329th day "The Good News" (吉報, "Kippō"); 330th day "Different Paths" (それぞれの決意, "Sorezore no ketsui"); 331st day "Freedom (Selfishness)" (自由, "Jiyū")
38	May 15, 2020	978-4-06-518849-1	November 28, 2023	979-8-88-933276-3
332nd day "Potential" (自分の可能性, "Jibun no kanō-sei"); 333rd day "The Luckiest" (人生最大の幸福, "Jinsei saidai no kōfuku"); 334th day "Wolf Nature" (狼の本性, "Ōkami no honshō"); 335th day "My Team" (俺のチーム, "Ore no chīmu"); 336th day "The True Elite" (本物のエリート, "Honmono no erīto"); 337th day "The Elephant and the Fly" (象と蠅, "Zō to hae"); 338th day "Perfect" (パーフェクト, "Pāfekuto"); 339th day "Be Grateful" (感謝を込めて, "Kansha o komete"); 340th day "The One and Only" (唯一の存在, "Yuiitsu no sonzai")
39	August 17, 2020	978-4-06-520327-9	January 23, 2024	979-8-88-933331-9
341st day "The Dance of the Genius" (天才の舞, "Tensai no mai"); 342nd day "Don't Look Back" (振り向くな, "Furimuku na"); 343rd day "Alone in the Snow" (雪原に一人, "Setsugen ni hitori"); 344th day "It's All Right" (大丈夫, "Daijōbu"); 345th day "Lock On" (ロックオン, "Rokku on"); 346th day "Resuscitation" (蘇生, "Sosei"); 347th day "One Team" (ONE TEAM, "One Team"); 348th day "Kindness" (優しさ, "Yasashi-sa"); 349th day "The Most Important Thing" (大事なもの, "Daiji na mono")
40	October 16, 2020	978-4-06-521009-3	March 26, 2024	979-8-88-933419-4
350th day "Wake-Up Callit" (伝令, "Denrei"); 351st day "Gaze" (まなざし, "Manazashi"); 352nd day "The Fated Pair" (運命の2人, "Unmei no 2-nin"); 353rd day "This One's For You" (君へ, "Kimi e"); 354th day "Stars" (スター, "Sutā"); 355th day "Eternity" (永遠, "Eien"); 356th day "Sending a Message" (メッセージ, "Messeiji"); 357th day "Beyond Limits" (極限領域, "Kyokugen ryōiki"); 358th day "Hisahito Mizuki" (水樹寿人, "Mizuki Hisato")
41	December 17, 2020	978-4-06-521484-8	May 28, 2024	979-8-88-933495-8
359th day "Hero" (HERO, "Hero"); 360th day "Impact" (存在証明, "Sonzai shōmei"); 361st day "The Captain's Armband" (キャプテンマーク, "Kyaputen māku"); 362nd day "Unpredictable" (計算不能, "Keisan funō"); 363rd day "The Weakest Captain" (最弱のキャプテン, "Saijaku no kyaputen"); 364th day "The Clumsy Path" (無骨道, "Bukotsu dō"); 365th day "The Seiseki Tent" (聖蹟家, "Seiseki-ka"); 366th day "The Final Card" (最後のカード, "Saigo no kādo"); 367th day "Playing Together, Being Together" (共存共演, "Kyōzon kyōen")
42	March 17, 2021	978-4-06-522216-4; 978-4-06-522653-7 (LE)	July 23, 2024	979-8-88-933628-0
368th day "One Thing's For Sure" (確かなもの, "Tashika na mono"); 369th day "Days" (Days, "Days"); 370th day "The Greatest Day" (最高の日, "Saikō no hi"); 371st day "High School Soccer" (高校サッカー, "Kōkō sakkā"); 372nd day "My Best" (僕の一番, "Boku no ichi ban"); 373rd day "Smiles in the Locker Room" (笑顔のロッカールーム, "Egao no rokkā rūmu"); 374th day "Pact" (同盟, "Dōmei"); 375th day "What I Wanted" (欲しかったもの, "Hoshikatta mono"); Last day "Someday" (またいつか, "Mata itsu ka")

== DAYS～fragment～ volume list ==
No.	Original release date	Original ISBN	English release date	English ISBN
1	February 17, 2022	978-4-06-526647-2	September 24, 2024	979-8-89-478017-7
Another day 1 "Genius Family" (天才家族, "Tensai kazoku"); Another day 2 "Invisible Yell" (見えないエール, "Mienai eiru"); Another day 3 "Brother's Back" (兄の背中, "Ani no senaka"); Another day 4 "Tohoku Spirit" (東北魂, "Tōhoku tamashī"); Another day 5 "European Expedition" (欧州遠征, "Ōshū ensei"); Another day 6 "Blue Sky" (BLUE SKY, "Blue Sky")
