= Mimana Iyar Chronicle =

2009 video game

- North American box art
- Developer(s): Kogado Studio; Premium Agency
- Publisher(s): JP: GungHo Works; NA: Aksys Games
- Director(s): Kurou Torikoshi
- Platform(s): PlayStation Portable
- Release: JP: February 26, 2009; NA: March 30, 2010
- Genre(s): Role-playing
- Mode(s): Single-player

Mimana Iyar Chronicle (ミマナ イアルクロニクル, Mimana Iaru Kuronikuru) is a role-playing video game developed by Kogado Studio and Premium Agency. It was published in Japan by GungHo Works on February 26, 2009, and in North America by Aksys Games on March 30, 2010, for the PlayStation Portable.

== Plot ==
A down on his luck mercenary, Crais Sewell, is hired as a bodyguard by a mysterious young girl named Sophie Rothorn. She hired him specifically and she wishes to use him as protection as she travels the world collecting seven gems. As they go along on their quest they soon discover that someone else wants to get his hands on the gems as well: Heidar, with the help of his henchman Feide. Crais and Sophie are also joined by Melrose (Mel), a sorceress, who wants to dissect Crais to discover the source of the strange magical aura the emanates from him. Not long after they are joined by a warrior, Tinon, who after Crais sees naked, claims she "will follow him until he marries her." Later, under bad circumstances, they are joined by Crais' cousin, Patty, who is an expert and collector of magical artifacts and healing methods. They embark on a dangerous journey filled with monsters and magic.

== Characters ==
- Crais Sewell - Voiced by: Chihiro Suzuki

A mercenary who is hired by Sophie to be her bodyguard. He is helping her on her quest to gather the seven gems which will allow her to enter the Temple of Water. Crais is a very moody guy and seems to hate kids for some reason. It is later revealed that the reason he hates kids was because of a trauma he had after losing his younger sister in the past. At first, he calls Sophie "kid", but after the incident where Sophie was almost killed, he starts calling her "Sophie" instead of just "kid". Throughout the story Crais changes a bit thanks to Sophie and the others. In the end, Crais become friends with Sophie and swears to protect Sophie with his life. He fights with a sword and has very few magic spells with him. He is last seen boarding the train with Sophie and Tinon at the ending scene.

- Sophie Rothorn - Voiced by: Hiromi Tsunakake

A young troubadour who hired Crais to be her bodyguard and to help her find the seven gems. She's sweet and naive and for that she upsets him. During their voyage, Crais and Sophie are getting fraternized and starting to have some interesting conversations. She almost died after protecting Crais from being attacked by the Dark Knight which led to a high fever. She fights with a small knife and has a balanced set of offensive and healing magic spells. She is a bit bothered by being constantly being teased by Melrose from time to time. She is last seen boarding with Crais and Tinon.

- Melrose Kirsch - Voiced by: Natsuko Kuwatani

A wandering sorceress who wanders across the world, examining ancient civilizations, unrevealed creatures and other mysteries. She saved Crais and Sophie from Feide after she almost killed them. Afterwards Melrose joins the party, hopefully to dissect Crais and find the source of the strange aura that's emanates from him. She fights with a variety of magic spells in battle. She likes to tease Sophie from time to time and get her to "fear" her. She is last seen saying her farewells to Crais, Sophie and Tinon at the train station along with Patty.

- Tinon Elliot - Voiced by: Ai Matayoshi

A warrior In-training who's learning to control her magic and powers on her own. On their way to the Forest of Doubt the road is blocked so Crais's trying to find a new road and without the intention, he sees Tinon naked. Bewilderment from "the incident" she feels dirty because she promised herself that only her future husband will see her naked. She's making Crais her future husband because of that and claims that she will "follow him until he marries her". She frequently calls him sweetheart. She fights with a pole-axe and has a few strong magic spells with her, most notably her "Shutorm", the spell she used on Crais upon meeting her naked. She is pretty jealous of Sophie and Patty for being so close with her "sweetheart", Crais. She is last seen boarding the train with Crais and Sophie at the ending scene.

- Patty Sucrer - Voiced by: Fumi Morisawa

Crais's cousin. She's running a shop at Audrey village and she's in a really serious debt. Her specialties with magical artifacts and healing methods help the gang to find the Holy stone to heal Sophie after their encounter with the Dark Knight. Although she is weak in physical attacks, she has a great variety of healing magic spells that she can use to heal allies in battle. She is worrisome over Crais and was a bit bothered by Tinon's jealousy towards her. She is last seen saying her farewells to Crais, Sophie and Tinon at the train station along with Melrose.

- Heidar - Voiced by: Kosuke Toriumi

Feide's master and the antagonist of the story. He's interested in the gems and he'd do anything to obtain them.

- Feide - Voiced by: Hitomi Nabatame

Heidar's obedient pawn. She's strong and loyal to her master, and will fulfill any order he gives. Melrose suspects she's a homunculus. She seems to have her eyes closed at all times until the final boss fight. During the final parts of the story, she betrays Heidar and leaves him. She was defeated upon meeting Crais and party again for the second time, but was spared by Sophie when she was about to be killed by Crais and becomes her servant for life. While Crais does not trust her at first, he begins to do so as the story progresses. She doesn't have any hard feelings towards Crais whatsoever. In the end, before she dies, she reveals herself to be Crais's younger sister, Coral, who he thought died a few years back. She was under Heidar's control and the fact that she never opens her eyes is because Crais told her to keep her eyes closed until he told her so.

- Dark Knight - Voiced by: Takashi Nagasako

A mysterious knight who seems to know about Sophie's secret. He's also after the gems. He is last seen watching the train that Crais, Sophie and Tinon board from a cliff somewhere and starts following them. His motives are still unknown.

== Reception ==
Reception

Aggregate score
| Aggregator | Score |
|---|---|
| Metacritic | 45/100 |

Review scores
| Publication | Score |
|---|---|
| Famitsu | 21/40 |
| GameSpot | 4/10 |
| IGN | 4/10 |
| RPGamer | 3/5 |
| RPGFan | 61% |

The game received "generally unfavorable reviews" according to the review aggregation website Metacritic. GameSpot described it as tedious and frustrating. In Japan, Famitsu gave it a score of two sixes, one five, and one four for a total of 21 out of 40.
