= Palais de Reine =

- Developer(s): Kogado Studio
- Publisher(s): Interchannel, GungHo Works, Degica (English)
- Platform(s): PlayStation 2, Microsoft Windows
- Release: EN: June 18, 2020; JPN: October 18, 2007 (PS2); JPN: November 10, 2006 (PC)
- Genre(s): Princess Simulation
- Mode(s): Normal, Hard

Palais de Reine (パレドゥレーヌ) is a Japanese videogame that was released on November 10, 2006 by Kogado Studio for Microsoft Windows. It was later released on PlayStation 2 on October 18, 2007 by Interchannel. It was published in English through the Steam platform on June 18, 2020 by Degica. It could be considered both a strategy game and an otome game.

== Plot ==
In the original Japanese version of the game, the protagonist is a young princess named Filia, with the story taking place in a kingdom similar to Medieval Western Europe. After the death of the king, she is the sole heir to the throne. In order to ascend to the throne, she has to get acknowledgement of the Knights and Lords of the kingdom; the Prime Minister of the kingdom plans to become king, however, and has conspired with his entourage to prevent the princess's coronation. Thus, one year later, the Seven Knights and the Lords will examine the princess again and determine whether she is worthy of the throne or not. Until then, the princess must get acknowledged by many of Knights and Lords. If she can obtain acknowledgement, she will be enthroned; if she fails, she will marry the Prime Minister who will then become king.
