= Gadget Trial =

2006 video game

- Cover of the DVD case
- Developer(s): KOGADO Studio (Kuma-san Team)
- Designer(s): Ein (graphics)
- Series: Gadget Trial
- Platform(s): Windows
- Release: ^{Japan} June 23, 2006^{China} July 28, 2007
- Genre(s): Turn-based strategy, Bishōjo game, Visual novel
- Mode(s): Single player

Gadget Trial (ガジェットトライアル, Gajetto Toraiaru) is a Japanese game for Windows operating systems, which combines turn-based strategy gaming with visual novel elements, using an anime style of artwork for its character designs. It was developed by KOGADO Studio's Kuma-san Team (one of the several in-house development teams), and was released in Japan on June 23, 2006. A simplified Chinese version of the game was published by Beijing Entertainment All Technology Co. Ltd. on July 28, 2007 with the title Jī jiǎ shàonǚ (Chinese: 机甲少女; lit. 'Mech Girls').

== Overview ==
Example of the visual novel interface in Gadget Trial. Characters: Izen, the infantry unit (left), Souka, the airforce unit (right) and Major Mihara, their commander (bottom, as an avatar).

Gadget Trial takes place in the future, decades after an unidentified world war, and focuses on the so-called E-Series. This is a new generation of military equipment, representing a very advanced level of technology, developed by an organisation called Eastern Treaty Union (ETU) under the codename Project 'Next E'. The E-Series units are human-like cyborgs or "bio-machines", constructed from various organic bio-alloys, and they are capable of regeneration and reproduction, similar to bacteria. Also, they can utilize Reinforcement Units, special machinery which extends their capabilities beyond regular war machines. Furthermore, their artificial brain greatly surpasses human mental abilities, calculating complex mathematical problems in very short times, and deciding very quickly between various options on how to complete a certain task.

However, there are two kinds of the initial prototype units; Type Black and Type White. The Black E-Series are made with pure focus on effectiveness, laying importance on machine-like obedience and precision. The White E-Series, in opposition to the Black ones, have artificial intelligences which are programmed with human-like personalities and emotions. Thus the military executive staff decides to have field trials, to test which design is better in battle, prior to a pending mass-production. The player gets the role of a young major who has to train and lead a team of Type White units against a group of Type Black E-Series. Regardless of their type and function, all the units look like attractive young females. Thus, Gadget Trial can be considered a bishōjo ("beautiful girls") game.

Example of a battle scene in Gadget Trial. The bottom of the screen displays a dynamic list of all the units on the map, ordered by their next turn of action.

First, the story and the White team is introduced to the player in a visual novel section. After this, the first trial begins. After a successful battle, a visual novel interlude comes again, which gives way to the next mission. Visual novel parts are always inserted between battles, for comic relief and to introduce the next mission.

== Characters ==
=== Type White team ===
Major (Shitoshi) Mihara (ミハラ 少佐, Mihara shōsa)

Mihara is in charge of the Type White team as the leader, always trying to act serious and a little bit harsh. He is often amused (in the negative sense of the word) by the girls' antics, comments and their overall diversity in their personalities. The player assumes his role in the game's story.

Voiced by: Tomokazu Sugita

Nei (ネイ, Nei) — Model number EPN-000GF NEI

Nei is the tank, scout and armoured personnel carrier (APC) unit. She has heavy offensive and defensive force, but with a limited movement range. She is the most respected member of the team, both because her combat power and her thoughtful, refined, feminine personality, which also complements her well-endowed figure. Nei acts like an older sister to the rest of the girls.

Voiced by: Shizuka Itō

Mini Nei

Mini Nei accompanies Nei while she uses one of her Reinforcement Units.

Izen (アイゼン, Aizen) — Model number EPN-001GF IZEN

Izen is the infantry and healer (combat medic) unit. She has very limited offensive and defensive force, but she is the only unit capable of infiltrating an enemy building, turning it over to the player's side. Izen is the archetypal "sunny idiot" or genki girl of the team; thinking positively, acting cheerful and making silly comments. For example, she likened themselves to regular vacuum cleaners, although a bit fancier. Her favorite snack is dynamite, and she envies Souka, because she can fly everywhere she wants.

Voiced by: Ryō Hirohashi

Souka (ソウカ, Sōka) — Model number EPN-002AF SOUKA

Souka is the jet fighter, carrier helicopter and bomber unit. She has good offensive power and a very large range of movement. She is overly confident with her superiority compared to ground forces, which fuels Yu-ri's and Hisoka's constant teasing, stating that she is a perfect killing machine with her ranged, emotionless, shoot-and-forget attacks, thus making her feel very awkward. Sōka can be compared to the stereotypical ōjo (high self-esteemed, selfish, arrogant, princess-like) characters in anime and manga.

Voiced by: Ryōko Shintani

Yu-ri (ユーリ, Yūri) — Model number EPN-003GF YU-RI

Yu-ri is the automated artillery and anti-airforce (AA) rocket and missile launcher unit. She is only capable of powerful long-range attacks, so other nearby units must protect her. She is the youngest-looking member of the team, and her personality fits her young image well, although sometimes she makes the most ironical and satirical comments towards the others.

Voiced by: Rika Morinaga

Hisoka (ヒソカ, Hisoka) — Model number EPN-004MF HISOKA

Hisoka is the submarine, carrier hovercraft and warship unit. She has good offensive force, but she is vulnerable if she is near the shore. She is the most cold-headed amongst the five, being an exact opposite of Souka, and the most reserved, contrasting Izen. Hisoka is rather calm thinking about her purpose as a war machine, talking about warfare and killing with a slight smile on her face. She is also the only team member who doesn't complain about the G-force test trainings, but endures them silently, reaching a test score far above even Nei's.

Voiced by: Kaori Nazuka

=== Type Black team ===
Major (Yuuki) Wakabayashi (ワカバヤシ 少佐, Wakabayashi shōsa)

Wakabayashi leads the Type Black team. She acts rather rude and condescending to Mihara and his team, firmly believing her obedient soldiers can easily beat the incompetent "weirdos" of team Type White.

Voiced by: Sango Minako

Type Black Izen

The replica of Type White Izen without a personality.

Type Black Souka

The replica of Type White Souka without a personality.

Type Black Nei and Mini Nei

The replicas of Type White Nei and Mini Nei without a personality.

Type Black Yu-ri

The replica of Type White Yu-ri without a personality.

Type Black Hisoka

The replica of Type White Hisoka without a personality.

=== Other characters ===
Colonel Fujimoto (フジモト 大佐, Fujimoto taisa)

Fujimoto is the superior commander of Mihara. He is the chief officer of the home base of the Type White team, and is close to retirement.

Voiced by: Hajime Uchino

Commander-in-chief Wan (ワン 総司令, Wan sōshirei)

Wan is the leading commander of the ETU.

Voiced by: Takako Ichinose

== Music ==
Gadget Trial's opening theme is called GoGo Girl!!. On July 21, 2006 Five Records released a collection of the songs and background music pieces, titled Gadget Trial Perfect Audiotracks.
