= Kogado Studio =

Japanese video game studio

KOGADO STUDIO, Inc. 株式会社工画堂スタジオ
- Industry: Video games
- Founded: 1916; August, 1960 (public trading)
- Headquarters: Tokyo, Japan
- Area served: Japan
- Number of employees: 43 In total Kogado Software Products: 18 (as of June 25, 2009) Kogado Studio: 25 (as of 24 April 2012)
- Website: http://www.kogado.com

Kogado Studio (株式会社工画堂スタジオ) is a Japanese video game developer and graphic design company.

The company was founded in 1916 as Zuan to Hanga Tani Kogado (図案と版画 谷工画堂) and originally handled design and printing. In the late 1960s Kogado entered the toy market and handled the Japanese localization of board games from Milton Bradley before creating original board games for Takara. The company later entered video game development in the 1980s.

Kogado has released adventure, strategy, and bishōjo games for the MSX, MSX2, PlayStation 2 and PC, including such titles as Symphonic Rain, Gadget Trial, Little Witch Parfait, Tristia of the Deep-Blue Sea (which has been made an original video animation), and Power Dolls. The studio has a number of teams working together.

== Subsidiaries ==
- KOGADO STUDIO, Inc. Design Production Division: Graphic design, digital content, corporate planning.
- KOGADO Software Products: Video game studio.

== List of teams in Kogado Studio ==
- Usagi-san Team
- Kuroneko-san Team
- Iruka-san Team
- Kuma-san Team
- Shimarisu-san Team
- Panda-san Team
- Kitsune-san Team
- Shukujo Team

== List of developed video games ==
=== Usagi-san Team ===
2000	Sequence Palladium MANIA KIT; Sequence Palladium 2 MANIA KIT
2003	Pointers (指極星)
2004	Sequence Palladium 2 DVD; Sequence Palladium 3 ~ Foam top and bottom
2006	Sequence Palladium (Aizo version); Palais de Reine
2007	Palais de Royale; POWER DoLLS series
2008	Palais de Carnival; Ayashi no Miya
2020	Palais de Reine (remastered version)

=== Kuroneko-san Team ===
1999	Little Witch Parfait; Little Witch Renette
2000	Flore in The Flower Garden; Parfait Fan BOX
2001	Angelic Concert; Happy ★ Millefeuille
2002	AS-Angelic Serenade
2003	Heartful Memories DVD (Little Witch Parfait 2 Heartful Memories); Magical Twara Angel Rabbi ☆; ASDVD-Newborn Love Song
2004	Symphonic Rain; Angelic Concert-Encore
2005	Little Witch Parfait Complete; Symphonic Rain (Collector Edition); AS Rabbi ☆ (Collector Edition)
2006	Dear Pianissimo
2007	Dear Pianissimo refrain; Solfege; Symphonic Rain (Popular Edition)
2008	Solfege ~ Sweet harmony ~
2009	Mimana Iyar Chronicle; Solfege ~ La Finale ~; Usotsuki and Inugami possession
2011	Smile ☆ Shooter ~ Fast ☆ Chiketto ~
2014	Little Witch Parfait-Kuroneko Mahouten Monogatari
2017	Symphonic Rain (2017 remastered version)
2022	Star Melody Yumemi Dreamer

=== Iruka-san Team ===
2001	RASETSU
2002	RASETSU XAN-Rakshasa / Zan
2004	RASETSU 2 ~ Rakshasa 2
2005	Blue flow; RASETSU 1 + Xan DVD pack; Blue flow fan disc
2006	Blue Blaster; Blue Blaster Fan Disc
2007	Giotail

=== Kuma-san Team ===
2002	Tristia of the Deep-Blue Sea
2003	Tristia Doki Doki Operation; Schwarzchild V
2004	Tristia of the Deep-Blue Sea Limited DVD Pack
2005	Neosphere of the Deep-Blue Sky; Neosphere of the Deep-Blue Sky: Exciting Adventure Effective E
2006	Gadget Trial
2008	Akatsuki no Amaneka and the Blue Giant; Gadget Trial (Popular Edition)
2010	Silver Cal and the Queen of the Blue Sky
2023	Tristia:legacy; Tristia:restore

=== Shimarisu-san Team ===
2011	Hakuisei Renai Shoukougun
2012	Hakuisei Renai Shoukougun Re:Therapy
2015	Hakuisei Aijou Izonjou
2019	Yumeutsutsu Re:Master
2020	Yumeutsutsu Re:After

=== Panda-san Team ===
2003	Swordsman Hoshin Engi-Hoshin Engi Ibun
2007	Keitai Shoujo PC

=== Kitsune-san Team ===
1999	The Project Mars 2; Schwarzschild III TRUTH
2000	The Project Mars 3; Psychic War 2: Great Ash; Guys & Dolls; Schwarzschild Z
2001	Schwarzschild IV
2003	The Project Mars DVD
2005	Joukyou Kaishi!
2006	Schwarzschild III + IV

== See also ==
- Cosmic Soldier (MSX)
