= Over Drive (manga) =

Japanese manga series

- First tankōbon volume cover
- Genre: Sports
- Manga
- Written by: Tsuyoshi Yasuda
- Published by: Kodansha
- Imprint: Shōnen Magazine Comics
- Magazine: Weekly Shōnen Magazine
- Original run: May 11, 2005 – May 14, 2008
- Volumes: 17
- Anime television series
- Directed by: Takao Kato
- Produced by: Hiroto Kumegai; Masatomo Nishizawa; Takatoshi Chino; Yuuichiro Takahata
- Written by: Katsuhiko Koide
- Music by: Kow Otani
- Studio: Xebec
- Original network: TV Tokyo, TVA, TVO
- Original run: April 4, 2007 – September 26, 2007
- Episodes: 26
- icon

Over Drive is a Japanese manga series written and illustrated by Tsuyoshi Yasuda. It was serialized in Kodansha's shōnen manga magazine Weekly Shōnen Magazine from May 2005 to May 2008, with its chapters collected in 17 tankōbon volumes. A 26-episode anime television series, produced by Xebec and directed by Takao Kato, was broadcast from April to September 2007. The story revolves around the first year high school student Mikoto Shinozaki and his goal to become the greatest cyclist in the world and winning the Tour de France.

== Plot ==
The story begins with a flashforward to the Tour de France, where Mikoto Shinozaki would become the first Japanese champion. Time before this, and while feeling a deep crush on Yuki Fukazawa, Mikoto then decides to get into a high school cycling club as Fukuzawa's suggestion, even though he has never practiced any sport before. The club's leader is Yōsuke, Fukuzawa's older brother and a renowned road racer from his town. Yōsuke's long time cycling partner and club's vice president Kouichi Terao sees in Shinozaki all the potential and courage necessary to become a road cycling legend. Mikoto Shinozaki becomes interested in cycling and all the ups and downs he must live to get his dream of becoming Tour de France's champion come true.

== Characters ==
=== Sakuragaoka High School ===
Mikoto Shinozaki (篠崎 命, Shinozaki Mikoto)
Voiced by: Yūki Kaji
A first-year student and the third member of the schools cycling club. Originally living a quiet boring life and getting bullied daily by the upperclassmen until one day when Yuki Fukazawa asks him to join the school's cycling club. Though he rejects this proposal at first as he, due to a childhood trauma he has forgotten, finds bicycles to be scary and thus he also does not remember how to ride one, but wanting to impress Yuki, he tries to train in secret and during this (short) time he starts to actually like bicycles. One thing leading to the other he ends up joining the club in the end and vows to become the greatest cyclist in the world.
Yōsuke Fukazawa (深澤 遥輔, Fukazawa Yōsuke)
Voiced by: Makoto Yasumura
3rd year student and the captain of the schools cycling club and is a bit of a fanatic when it comes to it. Like his sister he also likes to play tricks on people but mostly to Mikoto. One example is when Koichi explained why cyclists need to shave their legs and when Mikoto said he wanted to do the same Yosuke shaved them but along with his pubic hair as well. Has been bicycle racing since his early childhood, though not very much liked by his teammates as no one was able to keep up with him. The exception being his friend Kōichi. Both Yōsuke and Kōichi ended up leaving the cycling club and later on started their own.
Kōichi Terao (寺尾 晃一, Terao Kōichi)
Voiced by: Kenji Nojima
Childhood friend of Yōsuke and founder of the schools cycling club. He has the position of secondary captain. He is known as a "secret machine" due to the way he researches every small detail about the race conditions and major contenders. Because of this, he is the only one who can bring out Yōsuke's full power. He often mentions that he think Mikoto is very cute and also admires his strength and spirit which is capable of being a true cyclist.
Takeshi Yamato (大和 武, Yamato Takeshi)
Voiced by: Kishō Taniyama
Classmate, friend and fellow club member of Mikoto. He is 15 years old and is known as Kurosuke, a nickname which he dislikes, when out cycling because of his all-black clothing. Has previously lived in Spain. He is a climbing specialist.
Yuki Fukazawa (深澤 由紀, Fukazawa Yuki)
Voiced by: Kaori Nazuka
First-year student and Mikoto's big crush. She is Yōsuke's sister. She was the one that introduced Mikoto into the cycling world. She can be very manipulative and bossy to everyone around her and is prone to hitting them when she feels like it which is Mikoto for the most part. She also has the habit of taking embarrassing pictures of everyone but mostly Mikoto. At first Yuki could not really care less about Mikoto and his crazy antics, but her opinion began to change when she saw how dedicated he could be. Even though she was starting to see Mikoto in a different light she refused to admit this to others and herself.
Kaho Asahi (朝日嘉穂, Asahi Kaho)
Voiced by: Sayuri Yahagi
A girl in the same class as Mikoto. From a rich family, sponsors of a race. After seeing Mikoto riding, she starts to admire him and asks to join the bike club.

=== Other characters ===
Maki Kurata (倉田真紀, Kurata Maki)
Voiced by: Shiho Hisajima
Maki is one of Yuki's longtime best friends. Unlike the other two, Maki is a little calmer and more sensible. She does a lot with her friends and even accompanies Yuki to events like the cycling tournament, in which Mikoto and Yuki's brother Yōsuke take part.
Takanobu Terao (Terao Takanobu)
Voiced by: Rikiya Koyama
Father of Kōichi and the team manager. His wife left him long ago because of his obsession with bikes. Owns a bicycle shop, Terao's Cycling Shop.

== Media ==
=== Manga ===
Written and illustrated by Tsuyoshi Yasuda, Over Drive was serialized in Kodansha's shōnen manga magazine Weekly Shōnen Magazine from May 11, 2005, (Note: It started in the magazine's 24th issue of 2005 (cover date May 25), released on May 11 of the same year.) to May 14, 2008. Kodansha collected its chapters in 17 tankōbon volumes, released from September 16, 2005, to June 17, 2008.

=== Anime ===
A 26-episode anime television series adaptation, produced by Xebec and directed by Takao Kato, was broadcast on TV Tokyo, TVA and TVO from April 4 to September 26, 2007. (Note: TV Tokyo listed the air dates for the series on Tuesday at 25:30, which is effectively Wednesday at 1:30 a.m. JST.) The opening theme song is "Winder~Boku wa Koko ni iru~" (WINDER～ボクハココニイル～) by Shōnen Kamikaze. The first ending song is "Saihate no Parade" (最果てのパレード, Saihate no Pareedo) by Merry and the second ending theme is "Koi Suzumi" (恋涼み) by DEL.

==== Episodes ====
No.	Title	Original release date
1	"Boy Meets Bicycle (Part 1)"	April 4, 2007
Start with a short flashforward with Mikoto leading in Tour de France. Back to the present, Mikoto uses his own money to buy food for some upperclassmen during break. Meets his crush Yuki after school. She tries to convince him to join the cycling club. He's flattered but still unsure. Then he asks her to model for his drawing. He gets caught up in the moment and goes out of control, jumping up on the school desk, which reminds Yuki about her brother Yōsuke. Yuki later throws the painting through the window because Mikoto had drawn her wearing a bikini.
2	"Boy Meets Bicycle (Part 2)"	April 11, 2007
3	"Cross the Rubicon"	April 18, 2007
4	"Every Dog can be a Lion"	April 25, 2007
5	"Funky Monkey Baby"	May 2, 2007
6	"Give the Devil his Due"	May 9, 2007
7	"Hunger is the Best"	May 16, 2007
8	"Know Your Enemy as well as Yourself"	May 23, 2007
9	"Little Wings Fly High"	May 30, 2007
10	"Nobody Knows"	June 6, 2007
11	"Once a Chicken, Always a Chicken"	June 13, 2007
12	"Rules are Made to be Broken"	June 20, 2007
13	"Silent Men are Deep and Dangerous"	June 27, 2007
14	"The Devil's Children"	July 4, 2007
15	"All Good Things Come to an End"	July 11, 2007
16	"We Are Going to Climbing"	July 18, 2007
17	"Zeal is Runaway Horse"	July 25, 2007
18	"Deeds, Not Words"	August 1, 2007
19	"Men are Blind in Their Own Cause"	August 8, 2007
20	"Prosperity Makes Friends, Adversity Tries Them"	August 15, 2007
21	"Vision Without Action is a Daydream"	August 22, 2007
22	"Uneasy Lies the Head That Wears a Crown"	August 29, 2007
23	"Quick Resentments are Often Fatal"	September 5, 2007
24	"It's Dogged That Does It"	September 12, 2007
25	"Joy and Sorrow are Next Door Neighbors"	September 19, 2007
26	"You Never Know What you can do Till you Try"	September 26, 2007
