= Kaori Nazuka =

Japanese voice actress (born 1985)

- 名塚 佳織
- Born: April 24, 1985 (age 41); Tokyo, Japan
- Occupations: Actress; voice actress; singer
- Years active: 1993–present
- Children: 3

Kaori Nazuka (名塚 佳織, Nazuka Kaori; born April 24, 1985) is a Japanese actress and singer. She played Tsukasa Ayatsuji in Amagami SS, Nunnally Lamperouge in Code Geass: Lelouch of the Rebellion, the eponymous character in Eureka Seven and Cosette in Les Misérables: Shōjo Cosette. She announced her marriage in February 2011 and had a daughter on January 1, 2012. On December 4, 2021, she announced she gave birth to her second daughter. On April 24, 2025, she announced she gave birth to her third daughter.

== Filmography ==
=== Television ===
List of voice performances in television
Year	Title	Role	Notes	Source
1998	Ojarumaru	Kimiko of the Big Dipper / Cochan		
1999	Now and Then, Here and There	Lala-Ru		
2000	Carried by the Wind: Tsukikage Ran	Saya		
2000	UFO Baby	Miyu Kōzuki		
2001	Fruits Basket	Kisa Sohma		
2001	Captain Kuppa	Shakure		
2002	Seven of Seven	Nanapon		
2002	.hack//SIGN	Subaru		
2003	Nanaka 6/17	Satsuki Arashiyama		
2003	Di Gi Charat Nyo!	Yu-Rei		
2003	Avenger	Chris		
2003	Bottle Fairy	Chiriri		
2004	Jubei-chan	Women Chief Superintendent Nazuka	season 2	
2004	Futari wa Pretty Cure	Kyoko Mori		
2004	Legendz	Van		
2004	Madlax	Anne Moré		
2004	Grrl Power	Midori	OVA	
2004	Galaxy Angel X	Jibaku-chan		
2004	Sweet Valerian	Kate		
2004	Windy Tales	Nao Ueshima		
2005	Pretty Cure Max Heart	Kyoko Mori		
2005–2010	Gag Manga Biyori	Various characters	Main cast	
2005–2006	Tsubasa Chronicle	Chi		
2005	Eureka Seven	Eureka		
2005	Canvas 2 ~Niji Iro no Sketch~	Elis Hōsen		
2005	Blood+	Sonya		
2005	Noein	Miho Mukai		
2005	Mushishi	Aya Tokzawa		
2006	Simoun	Yun		
2006	Zenmai Zamurai	Wataamehime		
2006	.hack//Roots	Shino		
2006	Inukami!	Nadeshiko		
2006	Fushigiboshi no Futagohime Gyu!	Merba		
2006	Innocent Venus	Sana Nobuto		
2006	Le Chevalier D'Eon	Lorenza		
2006	Ghost Hunt	Mai Taniyama		
2006	D.Gray-man	Chomesuke		
2006	Gin'iro no Olynssis	Tea		
2006–2008	Code Geass series	Nunnally Lamperouge		
2006	Sumomomo Momomo	Tenten Koganei		
2006	Hell Girl	Yuriko Kanno	season 2	
2007–present	Strike Witches series	Lynette Bishop	OVA	
2007	Les Misérables: Shōjo Cosette	Cosette		
2007	Gakuen Utopia Manabi Straight!	Mai Takeuchi		
2007	GeGeGe no Kitaro	Maiko	5th TV series	
2007	Idolmaster: Xenoglossia	Ami Futami		
2007	Over Drive	Yuki Fukazawa		
2007	Kono Aozora ni Yakusoku wo: Yōkoso Tsugumi Ryō e	Akane Mitamura		
2007	Kishin Taisen Gigantic Formula	Sylvie Mirabeau		
2007	Darker than Black	Bai		
2007	Bokurano	Tsubasa		
2007–2008	Code-E	Sonomi Kujo		
2007	Moetan	Alice Shiratori / Black darkness		
2007	Bamboo Blade	Mei Ogawa		
2007	Mokke	Tomoko Iida		
2007	Shugo Chara!	Misaki Watarai		
2007	Rental Magica	Lapis		
2008	Hatenkō Yūgi	Rudovika		
2008	True Tears	Hiromi Yuasa		
2008	Spice and Wolf	Chloe		
2008	Mnemosyne	Mishio Maeno		
2008–2015	To Love Ru series	Yui Kotegawa	Also Darkness	
2008	Zettai Karen Children	Carrie		
2008	Soul Eater	Tsubaki Nakatsukasa		
2008	Library War	Nonomiya		
2008–2009	Birdy the Mighty: Decode series	Capella Titis		
2008	Earl and Fairy	Banshee		
2008	Tytania	Lydia		
2008	Master of Martial Hearts	Aya Iseshima	OVA	
2008	Shina Dark	Christina Rey Holden		
2009	Chrome Shelled Regios	Saya		
2009	Pandora Hearts	Flower Vendor Girl		
2009	Fullmetal Alchemist: Brotherhood	Maria Ross		
2009	Natsu no Arashi! series	Kaja Bergmann		
2009	Tears to Tiara	Llyr		
2009–2010	Beyblade: Metal Saga	Yu Tendo		
2009	07-Ghost	Libelle		
2009	GA Geijutsuka Art Design Class	Miyabi Omichi		
2009–2011	Kampfer series	Shizuku Sangō		
2009	Heaven's Lost Property	Mizuki		
2009	Miracle Train: ōedo-sen e Yōkoso	Mirai		
2009	Yumeiro Patissiere	Miyabi Kashino		
2009–present	Fairy Tail	Jenny Realite		
2010–2012	Amagami SS	Tsukasa Ayatsuji	Also SS+	
2010	Otome Yōkai Zakuro	Tae		
2011	Gosick	Orphan		
2011	30-sai no Hoken Taiiku	Natsu Andō		
2011	Sket Dance	Kaoru Yagi		
2011	Yu-Gi-Oh Zexal	Droite		
2011–2012	Horizon in the Middle of Nowhere series	Heidi Augesvarer		
2012	Natsuiro Kiseki	Yuka's sister		
2012	Sengoku Collection	Regent Girl Toyotomi Hideyoshi		
2012	Eureka Seven AO	Eureka		
2012	Ebiten: Kōritsu Ebisugawa Kōkō Tenmonbu	Shōko Ōmori		
2012	Aikatsu!	Emma Shinjo		
2012	Robotics;Notes	Frau Koujiro		
2012–2013	The World God Only Knows	Tenri Ayukawa		
2013	Oreshura	Saeko Kiryu		
2013	Amnesia	Heroine		
2013	Zettai Karen Children: The Unlimited	Sophie Grace		
2013	Fantasista Doll	Komachi Seishou, Tart		
2013–2016	Fate/kaleid liner Prisma Illya series	Miyu Edelfelt		
2013	Nagi-Asu: A Lull in the Sea	Akari Shiodome		
2013–2020	Log Horizon	Misa Takayama, Nazuna		
2013–2015, 2021	Non Non Biyori series	Kazuho Miyauchi		
2014	Captain Earth	Rita Hino		
2014–present	Haikyū series	Kiyoko Shimizu		
2014	Soul Eater Not!	Tsubaki Nakatsukasa		
2014	Mobile Suit Gundam-san	Sayla-san		
2014	Space Dandy	Pau	season 2	
2014	Akame ga Kill!	Chelsea		
2014	When Supernatural Battles Became Commonplace	Shiharu Satomi		
2014	Girl Friend Beta	Fumio Murakami		
2015–2016	Snow White with the Red Hair	Kiki Seiran		
2015	K	Douhan Hirasaka		
2015	Lovely Muco	Shinohara-san		
2016	Maho Girls PreCure!	Liz		
2016–2025	My Hero Academia	Tōru Hagakure, Yū Takeyama		
2016	Re:Zero -Starting Life in Another World-	Frederica		
2016	Bungo Stray Dogs	Margaret M.		
2017	The Dragon Dentist	Arisugawa		
2017	New Game!!	Wako Christina Yamato	Eps. 2, 4, 6–7	
2017	Dive!!	Kayoko Asaki		
2017	18if	Lily		
2018	Junji Ito Collection	Yūko, Tamae Mori, Mio Fujii, Lelia, Miyoko Watanabe		
2018	Pop Team Epic	Pipimi	Episode 6	
2019–2020	Bakugan: Battle Planet	Pegatrix		
2019	YU-NO: A Girl Who Chants Love at the Bound of this World	Ayumi Arima		
2019	Wasteful Days of High School Girls	Shiikyon		
2019	The Ones Within	Yuzu Roromori		
2019	Stars Align	Aya Katsuragi		
2019	Chidori RSC	Nodoka Ogura		
2020	A3!	Izumi Tachibana		
2020–2021	Bakugan: Armored Alliance	Pegatrix		
2020	Ikebukuro West Gate Park	Yui		
2022	Slow Loop	Ichika Fukumoto		
2022	In the Land of Leadale	Mai-Mai		
2022	Birdie Wing: Golf Girls' Story	Vipere		
2022	One Piece	Uta	Episode 1029–1030	
2022	Legend of Mana: The Teardrop Crystal	Pearl		
2022	The Eminence in Shadow	Aurora	Episode 12	
2023	The Fire Hunter	Hibana		
2023	KonoSuba: An Explosion on This Wonderful World!	Arue		
2023	Opus Colors	Akari Yamanashi		
2023	The Marginal Service	Lyra Candeyheart		
2023	Me & Roboco	Millie		
2024	The Apothecary Diaries	Suirei		
2024	Shangri-La Frontier	Ritsu Amachi		
2024	Mr. Villain's Day Off	C018		
2024	The Do-Over Damsel Conquers the Dragon Emperor	Elincia		
2025	Anyway, I'm Falling in Love with You	Manami Shiraishi		
2025	Grisaia: Phantom Trigger the Animation	Christina		
2025	Mobile Suit Gundam GQuuuuuuX	Kycilia Zabi		
2025	Ranma ½	Ukyō Kuonji		
2025	Can a Boy-Girl Friendship Survive?	Kureha Enomoto / Momiji		
2025	Detectives These Days Are Crazy!	Megumi Shiraishi	Episode 4	
2025	April Showers Bring May Flowers	Ritsuko Kanda	Eps. 4, 8	
2026	Even a Replica Can Fall in Love	Suzumi Mori		

=== Film ===
List of voice performances in films
Year	Title	Role	Notes	Source
2007	Inukami! The Movie	Nadeshiko		
2009	Psalms of Planets Eureka Seven: Pocket Full of Rainbows	Eureka		
2012	Strike Witches: The Movie	Lynette Bishop		
2014	K: Missing Kings	Dōhan Hirasaka		
2015	Appleseed Alpha	Nyx		
2017	Fate/kaleid liner Prisma Illya: Vow in the Snow	Miyu Edelfelt		
2018	Non Non Biyori Vacation	Kazuho Miyauchi		
2017–19	Eureka Seven Hi-Evolution	Eureka		
2019	Code Geass: Lelouch of the Re;surrection	Nunnally vi Britannia		
2019	Grisaia: Phantom Trigger the Animation	Chris		
2019	KonoSuba: God's Blessing on this Wonderful World! Legend of Crimson	Arue		
2021	Fate/kaleid liner Prisma Illya: Licht - The Nameless Girl	Miyu Edelfelt		
2022	One Piece Film: Red	Uta	Speaking voice	
2026	Paris ni Saku Étoile	Jeanne		

=== Live-action films ===
List of acting performances in films
Year	Title	Role	Notes	Source
2018	Tsumasaki no Uchū	Shiori		
2023	Mom, Is That You?!			

=== Drama CD ===
List of voice performances in drama CDs and related audio recordings
Year	Title	Role	Notes	Source
2007	The Qwaser of Stigmata	Tomo Yamanobe		

=== Video games ===
List of voice performances in video games
Year	Title	Role	Notes	Source
2005	Memories Off 5: Togireta Film	Miumi Sawarabi	PS2	
2006	Canvas 2: Niji Iro no Sketch	Elis Hosen	PS1/PS2	
2006	.hack//G.U. games	Shino	PS2	
2006	Gadget Trial	Hisoka	PC	
2007	Mist of Chaos	Ruche	PS3	
2007	Simoun	Yun	PS1 / PS2	
2007	Everybody's Golf 5	Natsumi	PS3	
2007	Another Century's Episode 3: The Final	Eureka	PS1 / PS2	
2007	Tales of Innocence	Ange Serena, Himmel	DS, Also R in 2012	
2008	Armored Core For Answer	Lilium Walcott	PS3, Xbox 360	
2008	Lux-Pain	Yamase Louis	DS	
2008	Code Geass: Lelouch of the Rebellion: Lost Colors	Nunnally Lamperouge	PS2, PSP	
2008–09	Tears to Tiara games	Suiru	PS3	
2008	Moetan DS	Alice Shiratori	DS	
2008–15	To Love-Ru games	Yui Kotegawa		
2008	The Last Remnant	Irina Sykes	Xbox 360	
2009	Amagami	Tsukasa Ayatsuji	PS2, also Ebikore in 2011 and 2014	
2009	Bamboo Blade	Mei Ogawa	PSP	
2009	Puyo Puyo 7	Draco Centauros	DS	
2009–10	Strike Witches games	Lynette Bishop		
2009	Assassin's Creed II	Caterina Sforza	PS3, Xbox 360	
2010	Crayon Shin-chan silly Daininden recommend! Kasukabe Ninja Team!	Kotri	DS	
2010	Atelier Totori: Alchemist of Arland 2	Totooria Helmold	PS3	
2010	Last Ranker	Mishi	PSP	
2010	GA Geijutsuka Art Design Class Slapstick Wonderland	Miyabi Omichi	PSP	
2010	Assassin's Creed Brotherhood	Caterina Sforza	PS3, Xbox 360	
2011	Tales of the World: Radiant Mythology 3	Ange Serena	PSP	
2011	Atelier Meruru: The Apprentice of Arland	Totooria Helmold	PS3, also Plus in 2013	
2012	Root Double: Before Crime*After Days	Yuri Kotono	Xbox 360, PC	
2012	Robotics;Notes	Frau Kojiro	PS3, Xbox 360, also Elite 2014	
2012	Aquapazza	Suiru	PS3	
2012	Girl Friend Beta	Fumio Murakami	Android, iOS	
2013	Horizon on the Middle of Nowhere Portable	Heidi Ogezavara	PSP	
2014	Tournament of the Gods	Client	3DS	
2014	Persona Q: Shadow of the Labyrinth	Rei	3DS	
2014	Fate/kaleid liner Prisma Illya	Miyu Edelfelt	3DS	
2014–16	Haikyū games	Kiyoko Shimizu	3DS	
2014–17	Flowers	Suou Shirahane	PSP, other	
2015–16	Atelier Rorona: The Alchemist of Arland	Totoria Helmold	3DS 2015 edition	
2015	Girl Friend Note	Fumio Murakami	Android, iOS	
2015	Fire Emblem Fates	Hinoka	3DS	
2016	Arena of Valor	Butterfly	Android, IOS, Nintendo Switch	
2016	NightCry	Monica	PC	
2016	Azure Striker Gunvolt 2	Zonda/Pantera	3DS, Switch	
2017	YU-NO: A Girl Who Chants Love at the Bound of this World	Ayumi Arima	PSV, PS4 (5pb. remake ver.)	
2017–18	Onmyouji	Oitsukigami	Android	
2019	Fate/Grand Order	Miyu Edelfelt	Android, iOS	
2019	Arknights	Astesia, Ray	Android, iOS	
2019	Kantai Collection	USS Atlanta, USS Houston	Android, PC	
2019	Robotics;Notes DaSH	Frau Kojiro	PS4, Switch, PC	
2019	Pokémon Masters EX	Lana	Android, iOS	
2019	Food Girls 2: Civil War	Ching	PC, Switch	
2021	Counter:Side	Chloe Starseeker	PC, iOS, Android	
2021	Blue Archive	Hibiki Nekozuka	iOS, Android	
2022	Guardian Tales	Flower Girl Bari	iOS, Android	
2023	Granblue Fantasy: Relink	Charlotta	PS4/PS5, PC	
2024	Honkai: Star Rail	Robin	PC, iOS, Android, PS5	
2024	Zenless Zone Zero	Tsukishiro Yanagi	PC, iOS, Android, PS5	
2025	Magical Girl Witch Trials	Tsukishiro Yuki	PC	

=== Dubbing ===
- Burying the Ex, Evelyn (Ashley Greene)
- Dragon Tiger Gate, Ma Xiaoling (Dong Jie)
- Paranormal Activity 2, Ali Rey (Molly Ephraim)
- X Company, Aurora Luft (Evelyne Brochu)
