= 30-sai no Hoken Taiiku =

Japanese guidebook series

- Cover of 30-sai no Hoken Taiiku

30歳の保健体育 (Sanjussai no Hoken Taiiku)
- Novel series
- Written by: Mitsuba
- Published by: Ichijinsha
- Original run: November 2008 – June 2011
- Volumes: 4
- Manga
- Written by: Rikako Inomoto
- Published by: Ichijinsha
- Magazine: Comic Rex
- Original run: November 2010 – 2011
- Volumes: 2
- Anime television series
- Directed by: Mankyū
- Written by: Ryō Akiyama
- Studio: Gathering
- Original network: BS11, Tokyo MX
- Original run: April 7, 2011 – June 23, 2011
- Episodes: 12

30-sai no Hoken Taiiku (30歳の保健体育, Sanjussai no Hoken Taiiku; trans. Health and Physical Education for 30-Year-Olds) is a Japanese guidebook series written by Mitsuba and published by Ichijinsha. The series is aimed at men in their 30s who have not had any romantic or sexual relationships with women. It includes colourful characters and some laughs. The manga adaptation by Rikako Inomoto started on the November/December 2010 issue of Comic Rex. In 2011, the book was adapted into an anime television series produced by Gathering and was broadcast in Japan on BS11 and Tokyo MX from April to June 2011.

== Media ==
=== Guidebooks ===
The first book was published in November 2008 and was followed by three sequels.

1. 30-sai no Hoken Taiiku (30歳の保健体育)
2. 30-sai no Hoken Taiiku:Koi no Hajimari Hen (30歳の保健体育〜恋のはじまり編〜)
3. 30-sai no Hoken Taiiku:Koi no Doryoku Hen (30歳の保健体育 恋の努力編)
4. 30-sai no Hoken Taiiku:Yoru no Ren'ai Hen (30歳の保健体育 夜の恋愛編)

=== Synopsis ===
==== Characters ====
Hayao Imagawa (今河 駿, Imagawa Hayao)
Voiced by: Hiro Shimono

Hayao is a 30-Year-old salaryman who has yet to lose his virginity. Due to his lack of personal skills he is resigned to using a blow-up wife to release his sexual tension. Hayao is the subject of Daigorō and Macaron's mission.

Natsu Andō (安藤 なつ, Andō Natsu)
Voiced by: Kaori Nazuka

Natsu is a 30-Year-old Librarian who has yet to lose her virginity. She is timid and extends her A.K. Field to keep away others. Natsu, like Hayao, has Gods staying with her to help her with relationships and lose her virginity. When she meets Hayao properly she rejects him out of fear; however, with Pī-chan's help and Hayao's determination, she overcomes her fear and develops a romantic attraction to him.

Daigorō (大五郎, Daigorō)
Voiced by: Ryōtarō Okiayu

Daigorō is a God of Sexual Love sent from heaven in order to help Hayao meet women and lose his virginity. Some of his methods are a little unorthodox. He usually dresses in a long old-fashioned green coat and white breeches.

Macaron (マカロン, Makaron)
Voiced by: Yui Watanabe

Macaron is Daigorō's little brother. His normal-wear is the same as that of his brother's, although he wears a waistcoat rather than a long coat. He likes drinking and dressing up in women's clothes; for this reason, he is often used as the practice doll for teaching Hayao.

Pī-chan (ぴぃちゃん, Pī-chan)
Voiced by: Eri Kitamura

Pī-chan and her twin sister Kū-chan are Gods of Sexual Love sent from heaven to help Natsu build relationships, fall in love and lose her virginity, they dress in the Gothic Lolita fashion; Pī-chan is the smarter and more pro-active of the sisters. She's had a run-in with Daigorō before as he liked flipping her skirt in elementary school, but also has a crush on Daigoro

Kū-chan (くぅちゃん, Kū-chan)
Voiced by: Eri Kitamura

Kū-chan and her twin sister Pī-chan are Gods of Sexual Love sent from heaven to help Natsu build relationships, fall in love and lose her virginity, they dress in the Gothic Lolita fashion; Kū-chan likes eating and drinking weird and often very spicy things such as Peppercorns and Tabasco. She helps her sister, but most of the time seems very dumb and makes life difficult for her sister. When she does do something on her own initiative, she is much more effective than her sister.

==== Episode list ====
No.	Title	Original release date
1	"First Sex" "Hajimete no Sekkusu" (Japanese: はじめてのセックス)	April 7, 2011
2	"First Deep Kiss" "Hajimete no Dīpukisu" (Japanese: はじめてのディープキス)	April 14, 2011
3	"First Men's Toilets" "Hajimete no Danshi Toire" (Japanese: はじめての男子トイレ)	April 21, 2011
4	"First Miss Bulgaria" "Hajimete no Misu Burugaria" (Japanese: はじめてのミスブルガリア)	April 28, 2011
5	"First Private Video" "Hajimete no Koshitsu Bideo" (Japanese: はじめての個室ビデオ)	May 5, 2011
6	"First Cowgirl" "Hajimete no Kijōi" (Japanese: はじめての騎上位)	May 12, 2011
7	"First Pink Vibrator" "Hajimete no Pinkurōtā" (Japanese: はじめてのピンクローター)	May 19, 2011
8	"First Dōjinshi" "Hajimete no Dōjinshi" (Japanese: はじめての同人誌)	May 26, 2011
9	"First Love Hotel" "Hajimete no Rabu Hoteru" (Japanese: はじめてのラブホテル)	June 2, 2011
10	"First Affair" "Hajimete no Uwaki" (Japanese: はじめての浮気)	June 9, 2011
11	"First Masturbation" "Hajimete no Onanī" (Japanese: はじめてのオナニー)	June 16, 2011
12	"First Condom" "Hajimete no Kondōmu" (Japanese: はじめてのコンドーム)	June 23, 2011

== Reception ==
The anime's censorship on TV was reviewed by Japanator as excessive, to the point that not only sexual gags were censored, but that text and the title of a segment was censored.
