= List of Innocent Venus characters =

This is a list of characters that appear in the anime Innocent Venus.

== Principal characters ==
Sana Nobuto (登戸沙那)
Voiced by: Kaori Nazuka (Japanese); Jessica Boone (English)
Sana is a mysterious girl with no memory of her past. She is protected by Joe and Jin as they attempt to run away from the military and government. Sana is very attached to Jin, though slightly afraid of Jo. Though Jin and Jo are deserters from the elite "Phantom" unit in the Logos military, Phantom is more interested in retrieving Sana than they are of punishing Jin and Jo or retrieving the stolen equipment.
Jō Katsuragi (葛城 丈)
Voiced by: Kenji Nojima (Japanese); Chris Patton (English)
A young dark-haired man of few words and absolutely deadly combat abilities. Unarmed, in a Light Warrior suit, or piloting his Gladiator mech, Jō takes out the enemy with alarming ease. After piloting a gladiator tears stream down his face, something he regards as almost like a side-effect. While in Phantom Jō worked as Jin's partner. Because many of Jō's partners in the past had feared him or been killed trying to match him, Jō developed loyalty towards Jin for having stuck with him. When Jin deserted Phantom, Jō followed. Jo fiercely protects Jin, however, despite initial beliefs, Jō also cares for Sana more than he lets on.
Jin Tsurasawa (鶴沢 仁)
Voiced by: Takahiro Sakurai (Japanese); Vic Mignogna (English)
A young white-haired man and the son of a politician, Jin worked as Jo's partner while in Phantom. After rescuing Sana and deserting Phantom, Jin acted as the leader of the group, protecting Sana and directing Jo. While he isn't seen using his gladiator as frequently as Jo, Jin is also a fierce warrior and is equally as willing to fight off their enemies and protect Sana. Jin is charming and ambitious, and almost fatherly to Sana. However, he hides a dark secret from the group.
Gora (ごら)
Voiced by: Naoki Yanagi (Japanese); Greg Ayres (English)
A teenage street rat hired by Jin as a guide, Gora travels with the group, but his mercenary nature occasionally makes him an untrustworthy source. He usually teases Sana by calling her "Princess".

== The Ishin Pirates ==
Toraji Shiba (司馬虎二)
Voiced by: Hideo Ishikawa (Japanese); Illich Guardiola (English)
The flashy and over-the-top leader of the pirates and captain of the Ishin. He wears the most amazing pirate garb, and a kimono tied the wrong way. Underneath the outlandish character, he is deadly in combat. He’s got a past connection to Phantom and knows way more than he’s letting on.
Hijin (ヒジン)
Voiced by: Romi Park (Japanese); Alice Fulks (English)
Shiba’s Second-in-Command, she’s a tough looking woman who means business, but that doesn’t mean that she can’t be polite to guests. Shiba has an annoying habit of calling her "Oryo" and her corrections are to no avail.
Gonza (ゴンザ)
Voiced by: Hiroaki Hirata (Japanese); Andrew Love (English)
Shiba's first mate, the leader of the pirate gang and is also one of the ship's hackers.

== PHANTOM ==
Maximus Drake (マキシマス・ドレイク)
Voiced by: Toru Okawa (Japanese); John Swasey (English)
The main antagonist. The commander of the elite unit Phantom, this scarred man is a cipher. The unit he commands is the most skilled in the nation, but feared, not respected. Several officials in the government actively work to undermine his plans.
Renee Vikro (レニー・ヴィクロー, Vikuro Lenny)
Voiced by: Megumi Toyoguchi (Japanese); Monica Rial (English)
Vice-Commander of Phantom, Renée seems as cold hearted as they come. She can bluff terrorists without breaking a sweat or plan an operation with deadly efficiency, and her sharp-shooting skills let her pick off targets from great distances. There is something odd about her relationships with other members of Phantom, both past and present.
Steve (スティーブ)
Voiced by: Kenta Miyake (Japanese); John Gremillion (English)
Other than the commander and the vice-commander, Steve has been with Phantom the longest. Featuring a facial tattoo and a bald head, Steve represents a Phantom soldier whose deeds show loyalty to his serving commander, yet shows the ability to understand and sympathize between the right and wrong.
Qing Lang (青狼)
Voiced by: Jun Fukuyama (Japanese); Nomed Kaerf (English)
The youngest member of Phantom, Qing Lang likes to use tarot cards for close quarters combat. He derives a devilish glee from reading fortunes before a mission... and telling soon-to-be victims that their fortune is death. He is able to detect the scent of gunpowder with great accuracy.
Kyoshiro (狂死郎)
Voiced by: Shintarou Ohata (Japanese); Josh Grelle (English)
His name derives from a Japanese word meaning “dying insane,” and that is probably what he is going to do. He has a fondness for knives, to the point of licking them with his freakishly long tongue. He is deadly at mid-range as a silent killer due to his knife throwing skills and demonstrates them during an infiltration mission. During this mission, he is seen to be enjoying inflicting pain during interrogation and licks his blade clean after the kill.
Riki (リキ)
Voiced by: Riichi Nishimoto (Japanese); Chris Ayres (English)
The final current member of Phantom, Riki is a huge tank-like man and just as fearsome a soldier as his comrades. He has some surprising bouts of common sense though.
