= Days (manga) =

Japanese manga series and its adaptations

- Cover of the first volume
- Genre: Sports
- Manga
- Written by: Tsuyoshi Yasuda
- Published by: Kodansha
- English publisher: NA: Kodansha USA (digital)
- Imprint: Shōnen Magazine Comics
- Magazine: Weekly Shōnen Magazine
- Original run: April 24, 2013 – January 20, 2021
- Volumes: 42
- Anime television series
- Directed by: Kōnosuke Uda
- Written by: Kōnosuke Uda
- Music by: Yoshihiro Ike
- Studio: MAPPA
- Licensed by: NA: Ponycan USA
- Original network: MBS, Tokyo MX, BS11
- Original run: July 3, 2016 – December 18, 2016
- Episodes: 24 + 5 OVAs
- Manga

Days Gaiden
- Written by: Yasuda Tsuyoshi; Saori Otoha
- Published by: Kodansha
- Imprint: Shōnen Magazine Comics
- Magazine: Magazine Pocket
- Original run: October 12, 2016 – May 3, 2018
- Volumes: 4
- icon

Days (stylized in all caps) is a Japanese sports manga series written and illustrated by Tsuyoshi Yasuda. It was serialized by Kodansha's shōnen manga magazine Weekly Shōnen Magazine from April 2013 to January 2021, with its chapters collected in 42 tankōbon volumes. In North America, the manga is licensed for English digital release by Kodansha USA.

A 24-episode anime television series adaptation by MAPPA was broadcast from July to December 2016.

By December 2020, the Days manga had over 10 million copies in circulation. In 2016, the manga won the 40th Kodansha Manga Awards for the shōnen category.

== Plot ==
Tsukushi Tsukamoto is a timid and unathletic teenager entering high school, where he hopes to reunite with his childhood friend and neighbor, Sayuri Tachibana. After bullies harass him during a visit to Sayuri's workplace, Jin Kazama intervenes, driving them off with nunchucks while claiming to be a wandering drifter. Jin, noticing Tsukushi's determination, invites him to fill in for a missing player in a futsal match that evening. Despite another altercation with his bullies and losing a shoe along the way, Tsukushi arrives after running nearly ten miles in heavy rain. Though small, inexperienced, and unskilled, he refuses to give up during the match, playing through injury and exhaustion. His relentless effort inspires his teammates, and in a final burst of energy, he scores the winning goal by colliding headfirst with the goalpost.

Later, Tsukushi learns that Jin will also attend Seiseki High School and decides to join the football club alongside him, unaware of the team's prestigious national reputation. Despite his physical limitations and lack of natural talent, his unwavering perseverance earns him a place on the squad. His relentless work ethic and ability to motivate teammates quickly make him an essential presence within the team.

== Characters ==
=== Main characters ===
Tsukushi Tsukamoto (柄本 つくし, Tsukamoto Tsukushi)
Voiced by: Takuto Yoshinaga
Tsukushi is a freshman at Seiseki High School and a forward on its soccer team. Though initially clumsy, his perseverance and effort make him a key player. He lives with his mother, who uses a wheelchair, after losing his father in childhood.
Jin Kazama (風間 陣, Kazama Jin)
Voiced by: Yoshitsugu Matsuoka
Jin is a talented yet eccentric freshman forward at Seiseki High School. Though naturally gifted at football, his aloof attitude and rule-breaking tendencies mask his true potential. A Bruce Lee enthusiast with a flamboyant style, he often teases Tsukushi by offering women's underwear instead of handkerchiefs. His football skills caused conflicts with past teammates, nearly making him quit the sport until Tsukushi inspired him. Originally a forward, he gradually transitions into a midfield role.

=== Seiseki High School ===
==== Soccer club ====
Hisahito Mizuki (水樹 寿人, Mizuki Hisahito)
Voiced by: Daisuke Namikawa
Mizuki is the captain and star player of Seiseki High School's soccer team. Like Tsukushi, he began as a complete novice with no skills but developed into an outstanding player through sheer determination. After graduation, he will join the Kashima professional football club. Academically weak and prone to getting lost, he frequently frustrates teammates by coining strange terms to describe plays. His powerful, aggressive style earns him nicknames like "the monster" and places him among "Tokyo's big three", the elite players of the region.
Atsushi Kimishita (君下 敦, Kimishita Atsushi)
Voiced by: Daisuke Ono
Kimishita is a second-year offensive midfielder and Seiseki's number 10 playmaker. A gifted student and football prodigy, he balances academics with work at his parents' shop while maintaining elite playmaking skills honed since his Tokyo city team selection in middle school. As the story progresses, he develops into a specialist set-piece kicker. He maintains fierce rivalries with teammate Ōshiba and opposing playmakers Indou and Taira.
Kiichi Ōshiba (大柴 喜一, Ōshiba Kiichi)
Voiced by: Mamoru Miyano
Ōshiba is a second-year forward and former child prodigy who began playing football as a toddler. Initially known for his selfish playstyle—focusing solely on scoring while neglecting defense—he transforms under Tsukushi's influence, becoming a more selfless team player. Towering over most Japanese players, the wealthy doctor's son possesses a brash, arrogant personality, frequently declaring himself "Hero". Though academically challenged like Mizuki, he obsessively covets the team captaincy once Mizuki graduates. His older sister harbors romantic feelings for Mizuki. During matches, Tsukushi typically replaces Ōshiba in the second half.
Yūta Usui (臼井 雄太, Usui Yūta)
Voiced by: Takahiro Sakurai
Usui is Seiseki's third-year defender and de facto team leader, serving as second captain behind Mizuki. While not ranked among the top players, opponents frequently commend his defensive expertise. His keen tactical mind earns him the nickname "Sergeant Usui" as he directs the team's formations. Initially aloof and indifferent toward others, he gradually develops respect after witnessing Mizuki's determination. Off the field, he demonstrates skilled culinary abilities.
Chikako Ubukata (生方 千加子, Ubukata Chikako)
Voiced by: Mariya Ise
Kozue is Tsukushi and Jin's classmate, initially portrayed as arrogant and critical, particularly toward Tsukushi. After abandoning her writing aspirations due to harsh feedback, she's inspired by Tsukushi's determination and joins Seiseki's soccer team as an assistant manager. Her role ignites a newfound passion for football, driving her to study tactics intensely. Over time, she forms an unexpected friendship with Hoshina, captain of rival Touin Academy.
Hiroyuki Kurusu (来須 浩之, Kurusu Hiroyuki)
Voiced by: Hiroyuki Yoshino
Kurusu is a first-year midfielder who initially prioritizes technical play but adopts a more physical style after being inspired by Tsukushi's tenacity. He forms the "1st Year Idiot Trio" with longtime friends and teammates Nitobe and Shiratori, maintaining their bond since elementary school.
Tetsuya Nitobe (新戸部 哲也, Nitobe Tetsuya)
Voiced by: Kaito Ishikawa
Nitobe is a first-year center back known for his aggressive defensive style, contrasting with Usui's tactical approach. As the most frequently fielded member of the "1st Year Idiot Trio", he initially resents Tsukushi's rapid progress compared to his own years of dedication to football.
Naoki Shiratori (白鳥 直樹, Shiratori Naoki)
Voiced by: Suzune Okabe
Shiratori completes the "1st Year Idiot Trio" as a forward with sharp shooting accuracy, though he sees less playing time than his teammates Kurusu and Nitobe.
Shou Nakijin (今帰仁 翔, Nakijin Shou)
Voiced by: Toshiyuki Toyonaga
A 1st-year goalkeeper. Somewhat quiet, Inohara thinks of him as a prodigy goalkeeper.

==== Others ====
Sayuri Tachibana (橘 小百合, Tachibana Sayuri)
Voiced by: Ayane Sakura
She is a childhood friend and neighbor of Tsukushi, whom she calls Tsuku-chan. A second-year student at Seiseki, she also works in a fast food restaurant.

=== Rivals ===
Kaoru Indou (犬童 かおる, Indou Kaoru)
Voiced by: Tomokazu Seki
Indou is a gifted playmaker from Sakuragi High School, forming a formidable duo with Narukami that elevates their team to national prominence. Recognized as one of "Tokyo's big three" and a "top-ten" player receiving professional offers, he shares a fierce rivalry with Seiseki's Mizuki. His exceptional field vision enables pinpoint assists. After a chance train encounter, he invites Tsukushi to a futsal match before their schools face off in the Tokyo qualifiers for the Inter High tournament.
Shuuji Narukami (成神 蹴冶, Narukami Shuuji)
Voiced by: Natsuki Hanae
Narukami is Indou's counterpart at Sakuragi Academy, forming a dynamic duo that elevates their school to national prominence. Though physically slight and previously hindered by bronchial asthma, he transforms into an aggressive, highly skilled forward during matches—displaying remarkable speed and precision. Tsukushi admires Narukami as proof that smaller players can excel in football.
Takumi Hoshina (保科 拓己, Hoshina Takumi)
Voiced by: Yuichi Nakamura
Hoshina Takumi is the libero and captain of Touin Academy, completing "Tokyo's big three" alongside Mizuki and Indou. The youngest of the nationally renowned Hoshina brothers—with one sibling already professional and another leading the collegiate league—he ranks among the "Top ten" high school players with a professional contract awaiting graduation. Though possessing excellent dribbling skills, he primarily focuses on disciplined defense and team coordination, playing cautiously. His team faces Seiseki in the Tokyo Winter Inter High qualifier finals.
Gen'ichiro Taira (平 源一郎, Taira Gen'ichirō)
Voiced by: Yūsuke Kobayashi
Taira is the captain and playmaker of Seikan High School, leading his team against Seiseki during summer training. Like Mizuki, he will join the Kashima professional team after graduation. Combining physical strength with precision passing, he forms an effective partnership with rookie forward Himura, propelling Seikan to the Winter Nationals.
Mayumi Himura (火村 まゆみ, Himura Mayumi)
Voiced by: KENN
Himura is Seikan High School's speedy freshman forward, whose rapid pace perfectly complements Taira's playmaking. He engages in a heated rivalry with Kazama over which first-year player stands as the superior talent.
Miran Aiba (相庭 未蘭, Aiba Miran)
Aiba is Ichiboshi Academy's star forward and the only second-year among the "top ten" players with a professional offer. A prodigious scorer in every league he's played, his elite dribbling and all-around skills make him nationally renowned and the focal point of his team's offense. Kimishita and Ōshiba, as peers, consider him their primary rival.
Kazuhiko Katou (加藤 一彦, Katō Kazuhiko)
Katou is the captain of Ryouzan High School, reigning champions of the Summer Inter High tournament. Considered the nation's top high school defensive midfielder and possibly the best player overall, he holds a spot on Japan's youth national team. His legendary stamina, tactical intelligence, and relentless leadership make him omnipresent on the field—a quality Jin notes mirrors Tsukushi's potential. Ryouzan boasts three "top ten" players, with Katou standing as their cornerstone.
Ryousuke Ikariya (碇屋 良介, Ikariya Ryōsuke)
Ryouzan High School football team's number 10, and a key member of the National team of his category, Ikariya is a superb offensive midfielder, nicknamed "Japan's Treasure". Ikariya is incredibly popular and is even sponsored for advertisement. A very versatile and highly technical player, Ikariya possesses amazing dribbling, ball control, incredible reaction times, and long distance shooting with his left foot, which is the reason for his other nickname, "The left of God". He is the second of Ryouzan's "top ten" players.
Marco Takagi (高木 マルコ, Takagi Marco)
Takagi completes Ryouzan High School's trio of "top ten" players as the nation's most formidable high school fullback. His combination of physical strength, blistering speed, and pinpoint crossing accuracy sets a historic standard for the position. While teammates Katou and Ikariya frequently miss matches for national team duties, Takagi becomes Ryouzan's consistent defensive anchor, earning deep respect from his peers. The unassuming country boy often contrasts with his more celebrity-driven teammates.
Asaichi Sunayama (砂山 朝, Sunayama Asaichi)
Sunayama is Otowa Academy's goalkeeper and the starting keeper for Japan's U-18 national team. Recognized as one of the "top ten" high school players, his exceptional reflexes, tactical intelligence, and commanding presence have made him a standout since his youth. Despite prioritizing national team commitments, he has carried his high school squad to back-to-back tournament finals.

== Media ==
=== Manga ===
Written and illustrated by Yasuda Tsuyoshi, Days was serialized in Kodansha's shōnen manga magazine Weekly Shōnen Magazine from April 24, 2013, to January 20, 2021. Kodansha collected its chapters in 42 tankōbon volumes, released from July 17, 2013, to March 17, 2021.

Kodansha USA publishes the manga in a digital-only format since April 25, 2017.

A spin-off manga, titled Days Gaiden, was published on the Magazine Pocket online platform from October 12, 2016, to May 3, 2018. Its chapters were collected in four volumes, released from March 17, 2017, to May 17, 2018.

=== Anime ===
A 24-episode anime television series adaptation, produced by MAPPA, was broadcast on MBS from July 3 to December 18, 2016. (Note: MBS lists the air dates for the series on Saturday at 26:58, which is effectively Sunday at 2:58 a.m. JST.)

Crunchyroll streamed the series with English subtitles as it aired in Japan.

Two original video animations were bundled with the 21st and 22nd volumes of the manga, released on March 17 and May 17, 2017, respectively. The original animation DVDs (OADs), depicting the All-Japan High School Soccer Tournament's Tokyo Preliminary Round with Tōin Academy, were bundled with the limited editions of manga volumes 26 to 28 on March 16, May 17, and July 17, 2018.

==== Episodes ====
No.	Title	Directed by (Note: Production staff information is taken from the ending credits of each episode.)	Written by	Original release date
1	"With Just That, I Feel Like I Could Keep On Running Forever"; Transliteration: "Sore dake de Boku wa Dokomademo Hashireru Ki ga Surunda" (Japanese: それだけで僕はどこまでも走れる気がするんだ)	Munehisa Sakai	Kazuyuki Fudeyasu	July 3, 2016
2	"I Want to be Part of the Dream"; Transliteration: "Yume no Ichiin ni Naritai" (Japanese: 夢の一員になりたい)	Kōichirō Kuroda	Kazuyuki Fudeyasu	July 10, 2016
3	"Playing Soccer with You is Super Fun, You Idiot"; Transliteration: "Omae to Soccer Suru no wa Mechakucha Tanoshi ze Baka Yarou" (Japanese: お前とサッカーするのはめちゃくちゃ楽しぜバカ野郎)	Tetsuya Endo	Hideo Takayashiki	July 17, 2016
4	"I Want to Put My Life on the Line to Live"; Transliteration: "Inochi Kakete Boku wa Ikitain Desu" (Japanese: 命かけて僕は生きたいんです)	Shun Kudō	Tatsuhiko Urahata	July 24, 2016
5	"That's Why I Will Keep on Running, Kazama-kun"; Transliteration: "Dakara Boku wa Korekara mo Hashiru yo Kazama-kun" (Japanese: だから僕はこれからも走るよ風間くん)	Kaori Makita	Seishi Minakami	July 31, 2016
6	"Running for Someone That's the Kind of Soccer I Want to Play"; Transliteration: "Dareka no Tame ni Hashirimasu Sore ga Boku no Mezasu Soccer desu" (Japanese: 誰かのために走ります それが僕の目指すサッカーです)	Tetsuya Endo	Kazuyuki Fudeyasu	August 7, 2016
7	"I Wish I Could Repay My Debt, if but a Little"; Transliteration: "Semete Sukoshi demo Ongaeshi ga Shitai" (Japanese: せめて少しでも恩返しがしたい)	Kōichirō Kuroda	Hideo Takayashiki	August 14, 2016
8	"If He Gets into it, He Will Become a Bullet"; Transliteration: "Hamareba AItsu wa Dangan ni Naru" (Japanese: ハマればアイツは弾丸になる)	Shun Kudō	Tatsuhiko Urahata	August 21, 2016
9	"We'll Get the Ball Over to Where Your Voice Can Reach Us in No Time"; Transliteration: "Omae no Koe ga Todoku Toko made Sugu Oshiageteyaru" (Japanese: お前の声が届くトコまですぐ押し上げてやる)	Kōsuke Tachibana	Hideo Takayashiki	August 28, 2016
10	"I Won't be Defeated by Such a Tiny Setback"; Transliteration: "Kono Teido no Zasetsugotoki de Ore wa Makenai" (Japanese: この程度の挫折ごときで俺は負けない)	Shigeru Ueda	Hideo Takayashiki	September 4, 2016
11	"In Order to Connect These Gleaming Days to the Future"; Transliteration: "Kono Kagayaku You na Hibi wo Ashita ni Tsunageru Tame ni" (Japanese: この輝くような日々を明日に繋げるために)	Shun Kudō	Hideo Takayashiki	September 10, 2016
12	"I Won't Let Anyone Be Disappointed Again"; Transliteration: "Mou Dare ni mo Shita wa Mukasenai" (Japanese: もう誰にも下は向かせない)	Kōnosuke Uda	Shigeru Murakoshi	September 18, 2016
13	"You Just Need to Look Forward"; Transliteration: "Omae wa Mae dake Mitereba Ii" (Japanese: お前は前だけ見てればいい)	Kaori Makita	Kazuyuki Fudeyasu	October 2, 2016
14	"Give Everything to Take My Spot Away From Me"; Transliteration: "Zenryoku de Ore no Isu o Ubai ni Koi" (Japanese: 全力で俺の椅子を奪いに来い)	Shigeru Ueda	Seishi Minakami	October 9, 2016
15	"I'm Sure I Can't Stay at Seiseki Any Longer"; Transliteration: "Kitto Koreijō Seiseki ni Ite wa Ikenai" (Japanese: きっとこれ以上聖蹟にいてはいけない)	Yasuhiro Minami	Seishi Minakami	October 16, 2016
16	"The Endless Waves that Keep Crashing In"; Transliteration: "Okusenman to Uchiyoseru Nami" (Japanese: 億千万と打ち寄せる波)	Kaori Makita	Tatsuhiko Urahata	October 23, 2016
17	"I Love This Team"; Transliteration: "Ore wa Kono Chīmu ga Suki ssu" (Japanese: 俺はこのチームが好きっス)	Naoki Hishikawa	Shigeru Murakoshi	October 30, 2016
18	"Tell Me, Kimishita: You Can Do It, Right?"; Transliteration: "Oshietekure yo Kimishita Omae nara Dekiru daro?" (Japanese: 教えてくれよ君下 お前ならできるだろ？)	Munehisa Sakai	Shigeru Murakoshi	November 6, 2016
19	"Come With Me. It's a Straight Shot to Nationals"; Transliteration: "Tsuite Koi Zenkoku made Itchokusenda" (Japanese: ついて来い 全国まで一直線だ)	Shigeru Ueda	Shigeru Murakoshi	November 13, 2016
20	"Don't Underestimate Seiseki"; Transliteration: "Seiseki o Nameruna yo" (Japanese: 聖蹟をなめるなよ)	Kaori Makita	Kazuyuki Fudeyasu	November 20, 2016
21	"Isn't Soccer a Blast?"; Transliteration: "Omoshirēyo na sakkā wa" (Japanese: 面白ぇよな サッカーは)	Naoki Hishikawa	Shigeru Murakoshi	November 27, 2016
22	"Right Now, I'm Seiseki's Captain"; Transliteration: "Ima wa Ore ga Seiseki no Kyaputen da" (Japanese: 今は俺が聖蹟のキャプテンだ)	Kazuhisa Takenouchi	Shigeru Murakoshi	December 4, 2016
23	"I'm a Member of Seiseki's Soccer Team, Too"; Transliteration: "Boku datte, Seiseki Sakkā-bu no Ichiin nanda" (Japanese: 僕だって、聖蹟サッカー部の一員なんだ)	Munehisa Sakai	Shigeru Murakoshi	December 11, 2016
24	"I Want to Play More Soccer With This Team"; Transliteration: "Kono Chīmu de Motto Sakkā ga Shitai" (Japanese: このチームでもっとサッカーがしたい)	Kōnosuke Uda	Seishi Minakami	December 18, 2016

== Reception ==
Volume 2 reached the 44th place on the weekly Oricon manga charts and, by September 22, 2013, has sold 24,745 copies; volume 3 reached the 36th place and, by November 24, 2013, has sold 35,528 copies; volume 4 reached the 41st place and, by January 19, 2014, has sold 24,837 copies; volume 5 reached the 32nd place and, by March 23, 2014, has sold 41,911 copies; volume 6 reached the 40th place and, by May 18, 2014, has sold 25,067 copies; volume 7 reached the 25th place and, by July 20, 2014, has sold 34,421 copies; volume 8 reached the 18th place and, by September 21, 2014, has sold 41,871 copies; volume 9 reached the 21st place and, by December 21, 2014, has sold 44,586 copies; volume 10 reached the 20th place and, by February 22, 2015, has sold 49,901 copies. The manga had 4.5 million copies in print by January 2017. By December 2020, the manga had over 10 million copies in circulation.

Days ranked 12th in the "Nationwide Bookstore Employees' Recommended Comics" by the Honya Club website in 2014. The series was nominated for the shōnen category at the 39th Kodansha Manga Awards in 2015, and won in the same category at the 40th Kodansha Manga Awards in 2016.
