= Tsuyoshi Yasuda =

Japanese manga artist

- Born: June 9, 1980 (age 46)
- Area: Manga artist
- Notable works: Over Drive

Tsuyoshi Yasuda (Japanese: 安田 剛士, Hepburn: Yasuda Tsuyoshi; born June 9, 1980) is a Japanese manga artist known for the manga Over Drive, and since 2013 for the manga Days for which he won the prize for best shōnen manga at the 40th Kodansha Manga Awards in 2016. He previously worked as an assistant under Taro Sekiguchi on the manga serial Wild Baseballers.

== Works ==
- Fire & Ice
- Isshun no Kaze ni Nare
- Over Drive
- Kuroneko Dance
- Days
- InspiRED (collaboration manga between Kodansha and Liverpool FC)
- The Blue Wolves of Mibu
