= List of Popotan episodes =

The DVD box cover of the Popotan anime depicts the three sisters: Ai (left), Mai (right) and Mii (center).

Popotan is a 2003 anime series based on the visual novel of the same name produced by the company, Petit Ferret. The story follows three girls, sisters Ai, Mai and Mii, and their maid, Mea, as they travel through time without aging, along with the mansion they live in. One of the sisters occasionally gathers crucial intelligence from conversations with dandelions—referred to as popotan—as they search for the mysterious figure of Shizuku. Popotan is a play on the Japanese word for "dandelions", tanpopo. (Note: In the Japanese language, nouns do not have a different form for the plural; therefore, tanpopo can be translated as "dandelion" or "dandelions".) It was developed by Shaft, directed and storyboarded by Shinichiro Kimura, and written by Jukki Hanada. The characters were designed by Haruka Sakurai and originally created by Akio Watanabe, under the alias of Poyoyon Rock.

Twelve episodes were produced. They originally aired on Tokyo Broadcasting System's satellite station BS-i, from July 18, 2003, through October 3, 2003, and were also made available at the same time on the Bandai Channel. On August 27 and 28, 2003, an event with the first volume Japanese DVD of Popotan was shown Animate Ikebukuro in Japan. The event featured guest appearances by the anime's voice actress for the three sisters.

On June 27, 2003, a teaser DVD with character designs by Haruka Sakurai was released. The DVD, The Secret of the 3 Sisters (3姉妹のひ・み・つ〜, 3 Shimai no Hi・Mi・Tsu) contains video interviews with the anime's voice actors, a CD containing music to the radio drama's, Poporaji (ぽぽらじ), theme "Poporaji no Uta" (ぽぽらじの歌), metallic paint illustrations and a plushie of Unagi. The anime was released on Japanese DVD by Bandai Visual in six discs of two episodes each. The set was released in staggered fashion between September 26, 2003, and February 25, 2004. Each disc also came with a promotional figurine of one of the girls. At the same time, Bandai released DVDs without the figurines at a lower cost. Geneon USA licensed the DVDs for North American release. Between December 7, 2004 and April 26, 2005, three DVDs were produced, each containing four episodes. A final box set was released on August 14, 2007, shortly before Geneon USA's demise. Sentai Filmworks, the licensing arm of ADV Films, announced that it had licensed the anime and would release the complete series in October 2009.

The Popotan anime has had one album and one extended play (EP) released. The album is the original soundtrack by Osamu Tezuka containing the television edited opening theme "Popotan Hatake de Tsukamaete" (ぽぽたん畑でつかまえて) by Under17 and the closing theme "Suki" by Funta. A joint EP, Popotan e.p. (ぽぽたん e.p.), was released by Under17 and Funta which contained the unedited versions of both songs as well as a joint song, "Gem Stone", which has also been listed as a theme song for the anime. The opening theme was also released on Under17's greatest hits compilation, Under17 Best Album 2 Moe Songu o Kiwameru zo (Under17 Best Album 2 萌えソングをきわめるゾ!!).

== Episode list ==
No.	Title	Directed by (Note: Information is taken from the ending credits of each episode.)	Written by	Storyboarded by	Original release date
1	"Secret House"; Transliteration: "Himitsu no Ie" (Japanese: ひみつのいえ)	Shinichiro Kimura	Jukki Hanada	Shinichiro Kimura	July 18, 2003
A young boy named Daichi visits a supposedly haunted mansion in an attempt to impress Asuka, a girl at his elementary school who believes in ghosts. However, Daichi meets three sisters, compassionate Ai, tomboyish Mai and energetic Mii, along with their stoic maid Mea and their pet ferret Unagi. They all agree to secretly help Daichi take fake photographs of ghosts in order to impress Asuka at school. Later on, Daichi learns that the sisters run a Christmas shop at the mansion. Daichi takes the sisters to a field of dandelions, where Daichi discovers that Ai can communicate with the dandelions. At school, Daichi's classmates find out that Daichi was taking fake photographs of ghosts, leading Asuka to run away in disbelief. A depressed Daichi returns to the mansion, and he is eventually consoled by Ai when she bathes him until he falls asleep. At night, Daichi wakes up and finds himself lying in the field of dandelions, as the mansion gradually disappears from his sight. Unbeknownst to Daichi, the inhabitants of the mansion can time travel. Asuka then finds Daichi looking up at the empty sky as if he has seen ghosts.
2	"Friends"; Transliteration: "Tomodachi" (Japanese: ともだち)	Mihiro Yamaguchi	Tsuyoshi Tamai	Kenji Yasuda	July 25, 2003
While attending middle school, Mai keeps her distance when meets her classmate Konami. A saddened Mai never enjoys time travel because she constantly loses the chance of making new friends. When Mai and Konami have to draw each other's portrait as a class assignment, Konami visits the mansion and is welcomed by Mii and Ai, much to Mai's consternation. Konami opens up to Mai in hopes of becoming good friends. The next day, Mai attends school with a positive attitude and spends the whole day with Konami. Mea later informs the sisters that their time is almost up. The following day, Mai reverts to her depressed mood. Konami confronts Mai after school for avoiding her all day, though Mai believes that her friendship with Konami must be short-lived. At the mansion, Mai cries to Ai that she wants to stay. Later on, Konami returns the bike that Mai left at school and gives a portrait of Mai as a parting gift, saying that they will always remember each other. The day after that, Konami is surprised to find out that the mansion has disappeared, though a portrait of Konami was left behind on the field of dandelions.
3	"Magic"; Transliteration: "Mahō" (Japanese: まほう)	Mihiro Yamaguchi	Noboru Kimura	Shinichi Watanabe	August 1, 2003
After watching a children's television series called "Magical Girl Lilo", Mii decides to cosplay as a magical girl. At the mall, Ai happily buys an expensive custom-made costume for Mii, much to Mai's concern. Meanwhile, Mea spends her time in the mansion ordering meals from various restaurants throughout the day. On a quest to help people in need, Mii fetches a balloon from a tree for a boy. A man later takes Mii to a hospital and introduces his daughter Miyuki, a terminally ill girl who is a fan of "Magical Girl Lilo". Miyuki wears an identical magical girl costume, and she joins the quest to help people in need at Mii's insistence. Ai and Mai arrive at the hospital just when Miyuki's father goes looking for Mii and Miyuki. Spotting Mii and Miyuki outside, Miyuki's father confides in Ai and Mai about Miyuki's terminal illness. When Miyuki bruises her elbow after tripping and falling on the grass, Mii uses her healing ability, which then permanently cures Miyuki from her terminal illness. The next day, Mii and Miyuki continue their quest in helping people in need.
4	"Alone"; Transliteration: "Hitoribotchi" (Japanese: ひとりぼっち)	Taiki Nishimura	Tomoyasu Ookubo	Tsuneo Tominaga	August 8, 2003
Alone in the Christmas shop, Mea meets a mysterious girl, who requests Mea to repair her broken doll. When the sisters return home, the girl suddenly vanishes, leaving her doll behind. Although initially reluctant, Mea decides to repair the doll. The next day, Ai tells Mea about a deserted village. A ball of light captures Mii in her bedroom and Mai in the woods. Returning to retrieve her doll from Mea, the girl disappears again after mentioning that she came from the deserted village. After failing to find Mai and Mii, Ai is also captured by the ball of light in the deserted village. By sunset, the girl reappears and leads Mea to a building where the sisters have been captured. The sisters have been imprisoned in a dream of their greatest desires. Though revealed as a lonesome spirit, the girl fails to enchant Mea after realizing that she has no desires. The girl is forced to pass on, while the sisters are freed from their enchantment. At night, Mea visits the grave of the girl. The following day, the mansion disappears from the field of dandelions, while the doll is left behind at the grave.
5	"Hot Springs"; Transliteration: "Onsen" (Japanese: おんせん)	Shinsuke Yanagi	Noboru Kimura	Shinichi Watanabe	August 15, 2003
The mansion arrives where an amusement park is under construction. Ai finds a dandelion that will supposedly guide the way. The sisters and Mea go to the local spring festival and enter a beauty pageant, in which Mii wins for being the fan favorite. Afterwards, the sisters and Mea visit various hot springs and play ping-pong while wearing yukata, in which Mai wins against Mea in an intense showdown. Upon reaching their destination, they find a barren field of dandelions. After visiting one more hot spring, they hike across a hill, where they stop at a creek before arriving at a luscious field of dandelions. Thanks to a vision, they discover that they are searching for Shizuku, a woman sporting green hair and wearing a poncho. Ai and Mii return to the mansion, but Mai and Mea decide to visit the last hot spring for awhile. However, Mai and Mea are left behind when the mansion disappears with Ai and Mii inside.
6	"I'm Home"; Transliteration: "Tadaima" (Japanese: ただいま)	Yasuo Ejima; Michita Shiraishi	Tomoyasu Ookubo	Shirou Tofuya (Note: A pseudonym used by an unknown member of Shaft. The name's Kanji spelling, 東風屋志郎, is an anagram of "Shaft".)	August 22, 2003
The mansion arrives five years later where the amusement park is now open. Ai and Mii begin their search as they realize that Mai and Mea may be close by, believing this to be the reason for returning to the same place during time travel. Sporting longer hair, Mai hears from her friends about the mansion, though of as a new attraction in the amusement park. In the evening, Mai and Mea reunite with Ai and Mii as they return home together. With Mai now attending college, she wishes to stay and live a normal life. Mea shows Ai a photo album depicting what Mai did during the past five years. The next day, Mii causes a scene when Mai spends time with her friends, revealing that Mai wore a wig. When Mai runs away from embarrassment, Mii gives back the wig, which then Mai throws down in frustration. Ai arrives and explains that their bodies do not age during the time spent away from the mansion. Mai eventually resigns herself to her fate. At night, the sisters and Mea return to the mansion with five years worth of clothes and household items, as the mansion disappears once again.
7	"Things That Cannot Be Said"; Transliteration: "Ienai Koto" (Japanese: いえないこと)	Takashi Yamazaki	Jukki Hanada	Takashi Yamazaki	August 29, 2003
Daichi and Asuka are now married and have a daughter together. While the sisters and Mea sell ice cream at the beach, Daichi makes a surprise visit and reveals that it has been thirty years since his first encounter with the mansion. Although Ai is bereft of words, a man named Keith suddenly arrives and prevents Daichi from prying any further. Ai and Keith soon share a kiss, and she becomes smitten with him. Keith later accompanies Ai to a field of dandelions, where he implores her to talk to him about anything, though she fails to open up to him. Daichi returns to the mansion at night in order to confirm his suspicions about its true nature of time travel. However, Keith suddenly attacks Daichi on the beach, where Mai and Mea attempt to fight back, but to no avail. No longer in love with Keith, Ai realizes that Keith is a guide working for Shizuku. With his suspicions confirmed, Daichi promises never to publicly reveal the quest of the sisters. Daichi watches as the mansion disappears after the sisters and Mea make it back to the mansion.
8	"Christmas"; Transliteration: "Kurisumasu" (Japanese: くりすます (Note: Christmas, being a foreign word in Japan, is usually spelled in katakana as クリスマス.))	Yasuo Ejima	Noboru Kimura	Toshiyuki Shimazu (Note: A pseudonym of Hiroyuki Shimazu.)	September 5, 2003
The mansion arrives in the holy grounds of a Shinto shrine, where Mii soon befriends Nono, a devout shrine maiden in training. Astounded by the Christmas shop, Nono expresses her love for Christmas, (Note: Christmas is celebrated by most Japanese people, for whom it is a secular holiday dedicated to get-togethers and gift exchanges with friends and family. Christmas Eve is generally observed more than Christmas Day.) but she has to deal with her strict grandfather, who is the Shinto priest. Tempted to visit the Christmas shop, Nono shows Mii a Christmas book about family, urging Mii to put up Christmas decorations in the Shinto shrine. Upon seeing this, Nono's grandfather banishes Nono from the Shinto shrine, forcing Nono to temporarily lodge in the mansion. Mii gives Nono a tour of all the bedrooms. Nono and her grandfather begin to miss each other's company as the evening comes. As Nono's grandfather eventually relents on the following day, Mii arranges for Nono to share a Christmas cake with her grandfather, who gives her a teddy bear as a gift. The mansion vanishes after the sisters leave behind more gifts for Nono.
9	"One More Time"; Transliteration: "Mō Ichido" (Japanese: もういちど)	Michita Shiraishi	Tsuyoshi Tamai	Shinichi Watanabe	September 12, 2003
The mansion appears in a town where Mai first met Konami forty years ago. Mai briefly encounters a girl with a striking resemblance to Konami, learning that she is Konami's daughter, who is also named Mai. Konami's daughter initially rebuffs Mai after expressing resentment for being named after her. Mai fails to befriend Konami's daughter even after several attempts at being sociable. After school, Mai runs into Keith, who warns her about the pain caused by leaving behind all the friends made during the quest through time. Mai rummages through the garbage in hopes of helping Konami's daughter find her lost sketchbook hidden by two devious classmates. However, the sketchbook is returned by three gossiping classmates, who apologize for not doing anything sooner. Later on, Konami's daughter tells Mai that Konami patiently waited for the return of a dear friend, but Konami died from an illness two years ago. As Mai returns to the mansion during a downpour, she blames herself for being at fault. Taking one last look at Konami's photo album, Konami's daughter is distraught upon realizing that Konami was Mai's dear friend.
10	"The Gift"; Transliteration: "Okurimono" (Japanese: おくりもの)	Taiki Nishimura	Tsuyoshi Ookubo	Bob Shirahata	September 19, 2003
A grieving Mai tries to burn her portrait previously drawn by Konami, but Mea intervenes and stores it with her other gifts. Mii stays at the mansion to look after Mai, while Mea shops at the grocery store. Mea crosses paths with Keith at a café and bar, where he reminds her that she is a guard working for Shizuku. Keith tells Mea that he will be the one to take the sisters to see Shizuku, but Mea loathes this plan of action since the sisters are not ready. Meanwhile, Ai learns from a dandelion that the journey is almost over. Mea recalls when she was a guard for two brothers who also went on a quest through time, but they started questioning the purpose of the journey. The sisters celebrate the news of finally meeting Shizuku, while Mea feels concerned about them. At night, Mea goes outside to confront Keith, and she seemingly defeats him. However, Keith easily immobilizes Mea and leaves her behind just as the mansion disappears.
11	"Farewell"; Transliteration: "Owakare" (Japanese: おわかれ)	Shinsuke Yanagi	Tsuyoshi Tamai	Toshiyuki Shimazu	September 26, 2003
As the journey comes to an end, the sisters find themselves at a field of dandelions. Keith introduces the sisters to Shizuku, who explains that their journey was a constant repetition of meeting and parting. Since the sisters have grown weary, Shizuku offers to terminate their quest and send them back to the place and era of their choosing. The sisters arrive back at their mansion, and they each discuss their preferred place and era. Mai wants to live with Konami; Ai wants to live with young Daichi; and Mii wants to live with Nono. However, this means that the sisters will be permanently separated from each other. They individually contemplate how their lives would be different without being together. In their bedrooms, Mai first leaves a letter and Mii then leaves a video recording, both noting that they have made up their minds. Left alone with Unagi, Ai reluctantly makes up her mind as well and says farewell to the mansion.
12	"Popotan" (Japanese: ぽぽたん)	Shinichiro Kimura	Jukki Hanada	Shinichiro Kimura	October 3, 2003
Daichi and Asuka's younger son Daisuke and Konami's daughter are shown as adults talking about Ai, Mai, Mii, Mea and Unagi. Ai is shown as an absentminded teacher at a school, in which young Daichi and Asuka are two of her students. Mai is shown hanging out with Konami at the mall, in which Konami notes that Mai is acting more feminine than usual. Mii is shown living with Nono and her grandfather, in which Mii sees a redheaded girl riding her bike and mistakes her for Mai. Shizuku and Keith keep watch from the field of dandelions. After revealing the true nature of their journey to their friends, the sisters each begin to realize that they cherish each other more than the friends that they have made. Shizuku summons Mea to be a guard for the sisters once more. The sisters say goodbye to their friends when Mea returns with the mansion in order to pick up the sisters one by one. As Daisuke and Konami's daughter finish discussing the epic tale of the sisters traveling through time, the mansion appears right in front of them.
