= List of Popotan soundtracks =

Popotan discography
- Extended plays: 1
- Soundtrack albums: 2
- Compilation albums: 1
- Maxi singles: 1
- Drama CDs: 2

Popotan is a Japanese visual novel by Petit Ferret originally released in 2002 that was adapted into a PC game, an anime by Shaft and a radio drama broadcast on Osaka Radio. Three soundtracks based on the visual novel have been released. The first is a maxi single titled "Popotan", published by Petite Ferret. It was a limited print run released with the visual novel. The single contains vocal and instrumental songs of the opening theme, "Say It! Popotan"; the closing theme "Answer"; and "Magical Girl Mii"'s theme, "Magical Girl Mii's Pong". All three songs were sung by Haruko Momoi of Under17. The vocals were later re-released as part of their Best complications. The songs "Answer" and "Say It! Popotan" were also sung during their live tour. A limited promotional DVD for the anime was accompanied by a CD containing the unabridged songs by Under17 from the visual novel, and the song "Poporaji", which was later used for a radio drama by the same name. The last visual novel soundtrack was released with the Popotan's fan disc, Popotan Fan Disc together with A·SO·BO, and contains tracks for the background music.

Three soundtracks based on the anime have been released. Popo Music, an anime soundtrack, was released with music by Osamu Tezuka containing a TV cuts of the opening and closing themes by Under17 and Funta, respectively. (Note: A TV cut is where a song is modified for broadcast on television to fit within the length of the credits.) An extended play (EP) entitled Popotan e.p. was released jointly by Under17 and Funta. It contains the unabridged opening and closings of the anime as well as a new jointly produced theme song, "Gemstone" by both bands. An image CD, It's a PopoTime! was later released and contains character songs performed by the voice actresses for the series' three sisters: Ai; Mai; and Mii. The opening theme song for Poporaji is also placed on the CD. The opening theme was re-released as part of Under17's Best complications and performed during their live tour. Poporaji was later released separately on two CDs. The opening theme song "Popotan Kiss" was later re-released as part of Under17's second Best complication and performed during their live tour.

== Soundtracks ==
=== Visual novel ===
==== Popotan maxi single ====
"Popotan Maxi Single (ぽぽたん Maxi Single)" is, as per its title, a maxi single. It was first released on December 28, 2002, in a limited print run of 2000 copies by Petit Ferret for the initial release of the Popotan visual novel. The CD was later re-released commercially on May 4, 2003. It contains six tracks of the themes featured in the visual novel. The first three tracks are the vocals and the last three are the instrumental versions< used as background music in the game.

All tracks are written by Under17.

Popotan Maxi Single
No.	Title	Lyrics	Music	Arrangement	Length
1.	"Say It! Popotan" (いっちゃえ！ぽぽたん Icchae! Popotan)	Haruko Momoi	Haruko Momoi	Koike Masaya	3:30
2.	"Magical Mii's Pong!!" (みぃタンの魔法でポン!! Miitan no mahō de pon!!)	Haruko Momoi	Koike Masaya	Koike Masaya	3:13
3.	"Answer" (こたえ Kotae)	Haruko Momoi	Haruko Momoi		6:42
4.	"Popotan" (ぽぽたん [Instrumental])		Haruko Momoi	Koike Masaya	3:26
5.	"Magical Mii's Pong!!" (みぃタンの魔法でポン!! Miitan no mahō de pon!! [Instrumental])		Koike Masaya	Koike Masaya	3:15
6.	"Answer" (こたえ Kotae [Instrumental])		Haruko Momoi		6:22
Total length:					26:28

==== Poporaji no Uta ====
Poporaji no Uta (ぽぽらじの歌, lit. Poporaji's Song) is a mini-CD released by Bandai Visual in a limited press run of 10,000 copies on June 27, 2003, along with the preview DVD, The Secret of the 3 Sisters (ぽぽたん 送開始記念版 うガマンできない、3姉妹のひ·み·つ, Popotan Hōsō Kaishi Kinen ban Mou Gaman Deki Nai, 3 Shimai no Hi·Mi·Tsu) The mini-CD contains the main vocal themes from the visual novel performed by Under17 as well as the image song, which is also the opening theme for the radio show Poporaji, performed by the anime's voice actresses for the three sisters.

Poporaji no Uta
No.	Title	Music	Primary Work	Length
1.	"Poporaji's Song" (ぽぽらじのうた Poporaji No Uta)	Sayaka Ohara, Masumi Asano & Haruko Momoi	Radio drama's opening theme	3:52
2.	"Say It! Popotan" (いっちゃえ！ぽぽたん Icchae! Popotan)	Under17	Visual novel's starting theme	3:26
3.	"Magical Mii's Pong!!" (みぃタンの魔法でポン!! Miitan no Mahō de Pon!!)	Under17	Visual novel's mini-game theme	3:13
4.	"Answer" (こたえ Kotae)	Under17	Visual novel's ending theme	6:28
Total length:				16:49

=== Anime ===
==== Popotan e.p. ====
On August 8, 2003, Under17 and Funta released a joint album that includes the opening, closing, and album-exclusive theme songs for the anime Popotan: the opening theme; "Popotan Hatake de Tsukamae te" (ぽぽたん畑でつかまえて) performed by Under17; the closing theme, "Suki", by Funta; and a collaborative theme song, "Gem Stone". It was released by Lantis as an extended play entitled ぽぽたんe.p. (Popotan e.p.), which appeared three times on the Oricon albums charts and peaked at number 68. The CD contains a vocal and instrumental track for all three theme songs.

Popotan e.p.
No.	Title	Music	Length
1.	"Searching in the Field of Popotan" (ぽぽたん畑でつかまえて Popotan hatake de tsukamae te)	Under17	3:43
2.	"S･U･K･I"	Funta	4:21
3.	"Gem Stone"	Under17 & Funta	4:53
4.	"Searching in the Field of Popotan" (ぽぽたん畑でつかまえて Popotan hatake de tsukamae te [off vocal])	Under17	3:42
5.	"S･U･K･I" (off vocal)	Funta	4:21
6.	"Gem Stone" (off vocal)	Under17 & Funta	4:47
Total length:			25:37

==== Popo Music ====
On November 27, 2003, the original anime soundtrack Popo Music was published by Lantis. The soundtrack contains 30 songs, most of which were composed by Osamu Tezuka. The first and last tracks are the TV cuts of the opening and closing themes by Under17 and Funta, respectively.

Popo Music
No.	Title	Music	Length
1.	"Searching in the Field of Popotan" (ぽぽたん畑でつかまえて Popotan hatake de tsukamae te [TV edit version] by Under17)	Under17	1:35
2.	"Popotan Kiss" (ぽぽたん景色 Popotan Keshiki)	Osamu Tezuka	1:57
3.	"Sunset" (夕焼け Yūyake)	Osamu Tezuka	1:41
4.	"Everyone is Going Out" (みんなでおでかけ Minna de Odekake)	Osamu Tezuka	1:44
5.	"Curiously Drifting" (ふわっと不思議な Fuwatto Fushigi na)	Osamu Tezuka	1:41
6.	"A Peaceful Day" (のんびりな毎日 Nonbiri na Mainichi)	Osamu Tezuka	1:02
7.	"Activity" (活躍です Katsuyaku desu)	Osamu Tezuka	1:01
8.	"Good" (よかったね Yokatta ne)	Osamu Tezuka	1:15
9.	"Given Path" (決められた道 Kimerareta Michi)	Osamu Tezuka	1:59
10.	"Laughter's End" (笑いの終焉 Warai no Shūen)	Osamu Tezuka	0:18
11.	"Popotan's Destiny" (ぽぽたんのさだめ Popotan no Sadame)	Osamu Tezuka	1:58
12.	"Sad" (しんみり Shinmiri)	Osamu Tezuka	1:24
13.	"Well, should we get involved?" (はてな、絡んでる? Hate na, owarun deru?)	Osamu Tezuka	1:08
14.	"It is Very Quiet Now That You Are Gone..." (とてもしんみりしちゃった... Totemo shinmiri shichatta...)	Osamu Tezuka	1:54
15.	"Mystery, 3 Individuals" (不思議、3人 Fushigi, Sannin)	Osamu Tezuka	0:52
16.	"Mystery in the Mansion" (洋館の不思議 Yōkan no Fushigi)	Osamu Tezuka	1:25
17.	"Isn't it gorgeous?" (ゴージャスなのかな Gorgeous na no ka na)	Osamu Tezuka	0:50
18.	"The Popotan's Desires" (ぽぽたんの想い Popotan no Omoi)	Osamu Tezuka	1:48
19.	"Seriously, the Situation Deepens within the Mystery" (深刻、事態はさらに謎へ Shinkoku, Jitai wa Sara ni Nazo e)	Osamu Tezuka	1:10
20.	"Sentimental Mystery" (センチメンタル不思議 Sentimental Fushigi)	Osamu Tezuka	1:26
21.	"Cluttery Mansion" (ドタバタ洋館 Dotabata Yōkan)	Osamu Tezuka	1:34
22.	"I am Insanely Cute" (かわいくバタバタしてます Kawaiku batabata shitemasu)	Osamu Tezuka	1:10
23.	"Try to catch him?" (捕まえてごらん? Toramaete Goran?)	Osamu Tezuka	0:54
24.	"Ignoring the Conversation" (話はそっちのけ Hanashi wa socchi no ke)	Osamu Tezuka	1:10
25.	"Magical Girl Mii" (魔法少女みいタン Mahō Shōjo Mii-tan)	Osamu Tezuka	1:40
26.	"Reasoning" (推理 Suiri)	Osamu Tezuka	1:46
27.	"Fragments of Thought..." (思考の断片が... Shikou no kotohen ga...)	Osamu Tezuka	1:29
28.	"The Whole Day" (毎日のことごとく Mainichi no Kotogotoku)	Osamu Tezuka	0:49
29.	"Welcome Popotan" (ようこそぽぽたん Yōkoso Popotan)	Osamu Tezuka	1:57
30.	"S･U･K･I" ([TV edit version] by Funta)	Funta	1:35
Total length:			42:22

=== Radio drama ===
==== It's a Popo Time ====
It's a Popo Time was released November 6, 2003, by Lantis, and peaked at number 296 on the Oricon albums chart. The CD contains five songs, one for each of the three sisters. In addition, the CD also contains the opening and closing theme songs for the live radio broadcast Poporaji, which is based on the anime.

All tracks are written by Masumi Asano, Momoi Haruko and Sayaka Ohara.

It's a Popo Time
No.	Title	Music	Length
1.	"Ai's World" (あいのせかい Ai no Sekai [Ai's image song])	Sayaka Ohara	4:15
2.	"Endless Trip" (Mai's image song)	Masumi Asano	4:04
3.	"Magical Girl Mii Appears!!" (まほーしょーじょ☆みいタン参上!! Mahou Shōjo Mii-tan Sanjou!! [Mii's image song])	Momoi Haruko	4:40
4.	"Popotan Kiss" (Poporaji's opening theme)	Masumi Asano, Momoi Haruko & Sayaka Ohara	3:58
5.	"Poporaji's Song" (ぽぽらじのうた Poporaji no Uta [Poporaji's closing theme])	Masumi Asano, Momoi Haruko & Sayaka Ohara	3:53
Total length:			20:50

== Poporaji ==
The first CD, A Poporaji-like CD (｢ぽぽらじ｣っぽいCD, Poporaji ppoi CD), was released on September 26, 2003, by Lantis. The CD contains 27 tracks that are a mix of vocals and songs by Masumi Asano, Momoi Haruko & Sayaka Ohara with a guest appearance Mai Kadowaki as Mea.

The second CD, A Poporaji-like CD2 (｢ぽぽらじ｣っぽいCD2, Poporaji ppoi CD2), was released on February 25, 2004, by Lantis. The second CD contains 16 tracks, several of which repeat the names from the first disc, but are not repeat tracks. The disc also continues the story from the first disc. The second CD contains the voice actors from the original and includes Kadowaki as a main cast member.

Poporaji-ppoi CD 1
No.	Title	Length
1.	"'Po' Drama" (｢ぽ｣ドラマ "Po" Dorama)	1:00
2.	"Opening ♪" (オープニング〜♪ Ōpuningu~♪)	1:59
3.	"Amazing Mobile Phones" (驚きの携帯電話 Odoroki no Keitai Denwa)	0:55
4.	"Maimai together with... Popopoppo♪" (まいまいといっしょに...ぽぽぽっぽっ♪ Maimai to Issho ni... Popopoppo♪)	2:23
5.	"Popopo Love's Theater "Search for the Popotan" First Half" (ぽぽぽ愛の劇場｢ぽぽたんを探せ!｣前編)	3:11
6.	"The Amazing ☆ Spectacular Maimai's Case" (The 絶叫☆スペシャル まいまいの場合 The Zekkyou ☆ Supesharu Maimai no Baai)	1:47
7.	"The Amazing ☆ Spectacular Sayasaya's Case" (The 絶叫☆スペシャル さやさやの場合 The Zekkyou ☆ Supesharu Sayasaya no Baai)	1:18
8.	"The Amazing ☆ Spectacular Momoi's Case" (The 絶叫☆スペシャル ももーいの場合 The Zekkyou ☆ Supesharu Momoi no Baai)	1:14
9.	"The Amazing ☆ Spectacular Masumin's Case" (The 絶叫☆スペシャル ますみんの場合 The Zekkyou ☆ Supesharu Masumin no Baai)	1:28
10.	"Popopo Love's Theater "Search for the Popotan!" Second Half" (ぽぽぽ愛の劇場｢ぽぽたんを探せ!｣後編 Popopo Ai no Gekijō 'Popotan o Sagase!' Kōhen)	9:00
11.	"Health Food 'Pikopikopiipii'" (健康食品｢ピコピコピーピー｣ Kenkō Shokuhin 'Pikopikopiipii')	1:18
12.	"Popopo, Popoppopo" (ぽぽぽっ、ぽぽっぽぽ)	0:45
13.	"Poporaji Selected Masterpieces (Sayasaya Chapter)" (ぽぽらじ傑作選(さやさや編) Poporaji Kessakusen (Sayasaya Hen))	0:59
14.	"Poporaji Selected Masterpieces (Masumin Chapter)" (ぽぽらじ傑作選(さやさや編) Poporaji Kessakusen (Masumin Hen))	1:10
15.	"Poporaji Selected Masterpieces (Momoi Chapter)" (ぽぽらじ傑作選(さやさや編) Poporaji Kessakusen (Momoi Hen))	0:43
16.	"Popopopo, Poppopopo" (ぽぽぽぽっ、ぽっぽぽぽ)	1:02
17.	"'Popopo Real Estate'" (｢ぽぽぽ不動産｣ "Popopo Fudōsan")	1:06
18.	"Manga Japan Popopo Story 'Popotarō'" (まんが日本ぽぽぽ話｢ぽぽ太郎｣ Manga Nippon Popopo Hanashi "Popotarō")	8:44
19.	"Popopo Prep School" (｢ぽぽぽ学習塾｣ Popopo Gakushū Juku)	1:18
20.	"Ending♪" (エンディング〜♪ Endingu~♪)	1:10
21.	"1st Story: Popotan Photographic Record" (第1話 ぽぽたん撮影記録 Dai Ichiwa Popotan Satsuei Kiroku)	6:53
22.	"2nd Story: Does Mii's Hair Shine?" (第2話 みいたんに毛がはえた? Dai Niwa Mii-tan ni Ke ga haeta?)	5:32
23.	"3rd Story: St. Popotan School" (第3話 セントぽぽたん学園 Dai Sanwa Sento Popotan Gakuen)	5:59
24.	"4th Story: Turnabout Trial" (第4話 逆転裁判 Dai Yonwa Gyakuten Saiban)	5:22
25.	"5th Story: Popotan's Tiger" (第5話 ぽぽたんのトラ Dai Gowa Popotan no Tora)	5:45
26.	"6th Story: Child Play" (第6話 チャイルドプレイ Dai Rokuwa Chairudo Purei)	5:15
27.	"Wait for the Next Installment!! Preview of the Next Installment!!" (待て次回!!次回予告!! Mate Jikai!! Jikai Yokoku!!)	1:47
Total length:		1:19:03

Poporaji-ppoi CD 2
No.	Title	Length
1.	"'Po' Drama" (｢ぽ｣ドラマ "Po" Dorama)	0:27
2.	"Opening ♪" (オープニング〜♪ Ōpuningu♪)	2:31
3.	"Rapid Chacha Time!" (ずんずんチャチャタイーム! Zunzun Chacha Taīmu!)	0:46
4.	"The King has the Donkey's Popo: Explanation" (王様のぽぽは、ロバのぽぽ 説明 Ōsama no Popo wa, Roba no Popo Setsumei)	1:36
5.	"The King has the Donkey's Popo: Sayaka Ohara's Compilation" (王様のぽぽは、ロバのぽぽ 大原さやか編 Ōsama no Popo wa, Roba no Popo Ōhara Sayaka Hen)	7:13
6.	"The King has the Donkey's Popo: Masumi Asano's Compilation" (王様のぽぽは、ロバのぽぽ 浅野真澄編 Ōsama no Popo wa, Roba no Popo Asano Masumi Hen)	4:18
7.	"The King has the Donkey's Popo: Haruko Momoi's Compilation" (王様のぽぽは、ロバのぽぽ 桃井はるこ編 Ōsama no Popo wa, Roba no Popo Momoi Haruko Hen)	6:36
8.	"The King has the Donkey's Popo: Mai Kadowaki's Compilation" (王様のぽぽは、ロバのぽぽ 門脇舞編 Ōsama no Popo wa, Roba no Popo Kadowaki Mai Hen)	5:34
9.	"Ending♪" (エンディング〜♪ Endingu~♪)	3:54
10.	"The Drama Begins~♪" (ドラマ始まるよ〜♪ Dorama Hajimaru yo~♪)	0:11
12.	"Popotan RPG" (RPGぽぽたん RPG Popotan)	5:13
13.	"Mission Impossible" (ミッションインポッシブル Misshon Inposshiburu)	5:30
14.	"Aphrodisiac..." (媚薬... Biyaku...)	5:53
15.	"Sister Princess" (しすたーぷりんせす Shisutā Purinsesu)	5:53
16.	"Popopo Quiz" (クイズぽぽぽネア Kuizu Popopo Nea)	5:12
Total length:		1:05:06

== Release details ==
Album	Release date	Label	Format	Oricon peak chart position	Print run total
"Popotan Maxi Single"	December 28, 2002	Petit Ferret (GRW0212-2)	CD		2000
"Poporaji no Uta"	June 27, 2003	Bandai Visual (BCBA-1665)	Mini-CD		10, 000
Popotan e. p.	August 6, 2003	Lantis (LACM-4099)	CD	68	
Popo Music	November 27, 2003	Lantis (LACM-5239)	CD		
It's a Popo Time	November 6, 2003	Lantis (LACM-5216)	CD	296	
Poporaji-like CD	September 26, 2003	Lantis (LACA-5201)	CD		
Poporaji-like CD2	February 25, 2004	Lantis (LACA-5262)	CD		

== Legacy ==
Under17 later re-released their songs from the visual novel, anime, and "Popotan Kiss" from Poporaji in their "Best" albums. "Say It! Popotan", "Answer", and "Magical Mii's Pong" are all released on Under17 Best Album 1: Pretty Girl Game Love Songs (Under17 Best Album1 美少女ゲームソングに愛を!!, Under17 Best Album1 Bishōjo Geemu Songu ni ai o), which appeared twice on the Oricon charts, peaking at number 93. "Catching the Popotan Field" and "Popotan Kiss" from the anime and radio drama respectively have been released in the second volume, Under17 Best Album 2: Thoroughly Investigating Moe Songs (Under17 Best Album2 萌えソングをきわめるゾ!, Under17 Best Album2 Moe Songu o Kiwameru zo!), and appeared twice on the Oricon charts, peaking at number 50. "Say It! Popotan", "Answer" and "Popotan Kiss" were also re-released in Under17's final "Best" album, Under17 Best Album 3: And Thus to Legend... (Under17 Best Album3 そして伝説へ..., Under17 Best Album3 Soshite Densetsu e...), which ranked three times on the Oricon charts, peaking at number 58.

"Say It! Popotan", "Searching in the Field of Popotan", "Popotan Kiss", and "Answer" were later sung during Under17's live tour, which was later released on DVD, Under17 First Live Tour: Final And Thus to Legend... (Under17 First Live Tour Final そして伝説へ..., Under17 First Live Tour Final Soshite Densetsu he...).
