= Sumire Uesaka =

Japanese voice actress and singer

- 上坂すみれ
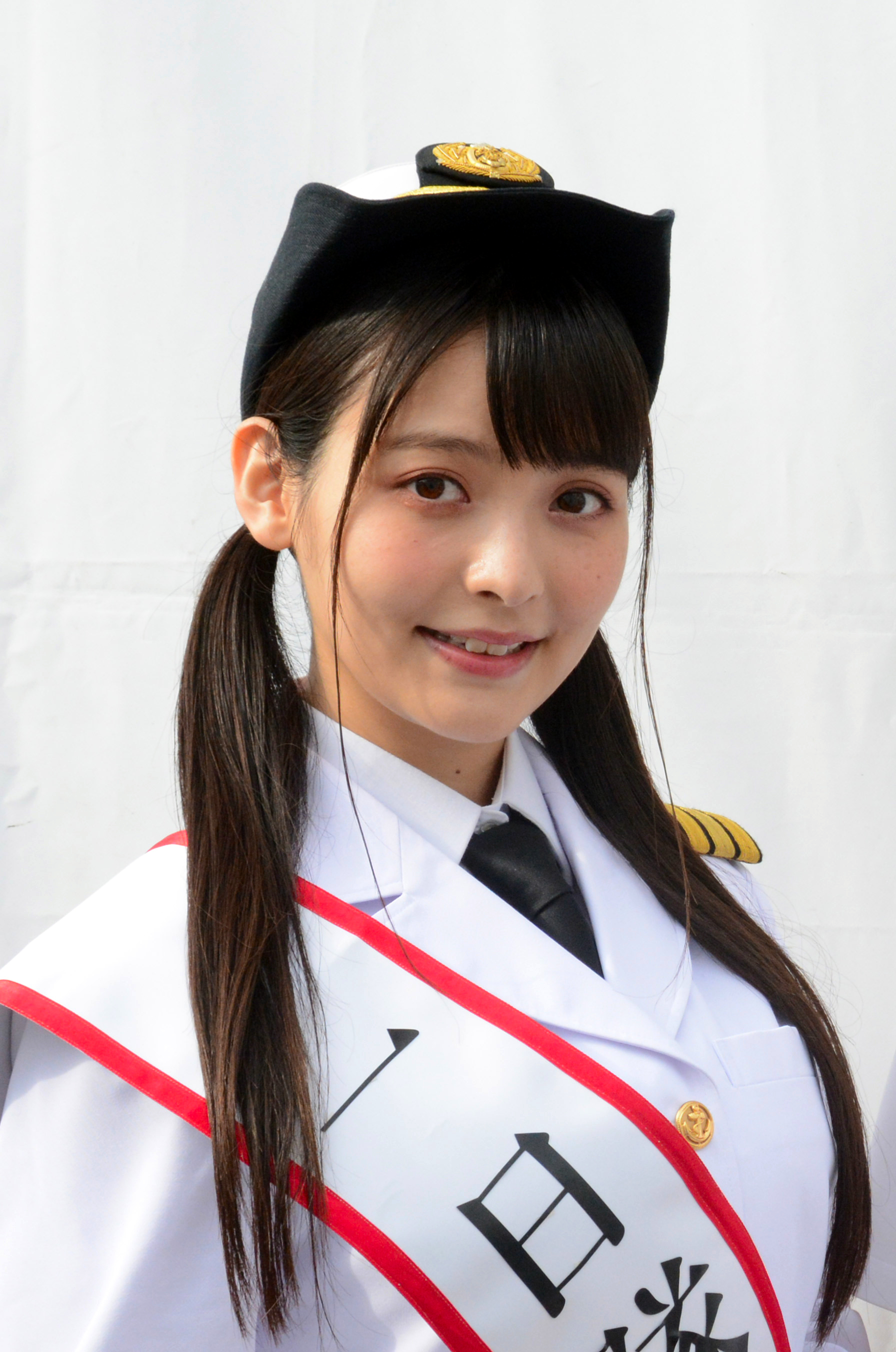
- Uesaka at the JMSDF Fleet Week Yokohama 2019
- Born: December 19, 1991 (age 34); Kamakura, Kanagawa Prefecture, Japan
- Education: Sophia University
- Occupations: Voice actress; singer
- Years active: 2000–present
- Agent: Voice Kit
- Awards: Best Rookie Actress, 10th Seiyu Awards
- Musical career
- Genres: J-pop; anime song
- Instrument: Vocals
- Years active: 2013–present
- Labels: King Amusement Creative; JPU Records
- Professional wrestling career
- Ring name: Sumire Uesaka
- Billed height: 5 ft 2 in (1.57 m)
- Debut: 2025

Sumire Uesaka (上坂すみれ, Uesaka Sumire; born December 19, 1991) is a Japanese voice actress and singer associated with Voice Kit. She began her career as a junior model in 2000, appearing in various commercials and becoming the first Japanese person featured in a Vidal Sassoon commercial. In 2011, she transitioned into voice acting. She won the Best Rookie Actress at the 10th Seiyu Awards. In addition to voice acting, Uesaka began a music career in April 2013 under King Records under the King Amusement Creative label.

In 2025, Uesaka made her professional wrestling debut and was an Ironman Heavymetalweight Champion twice. She is known for voicing Gunko.

== Career ==
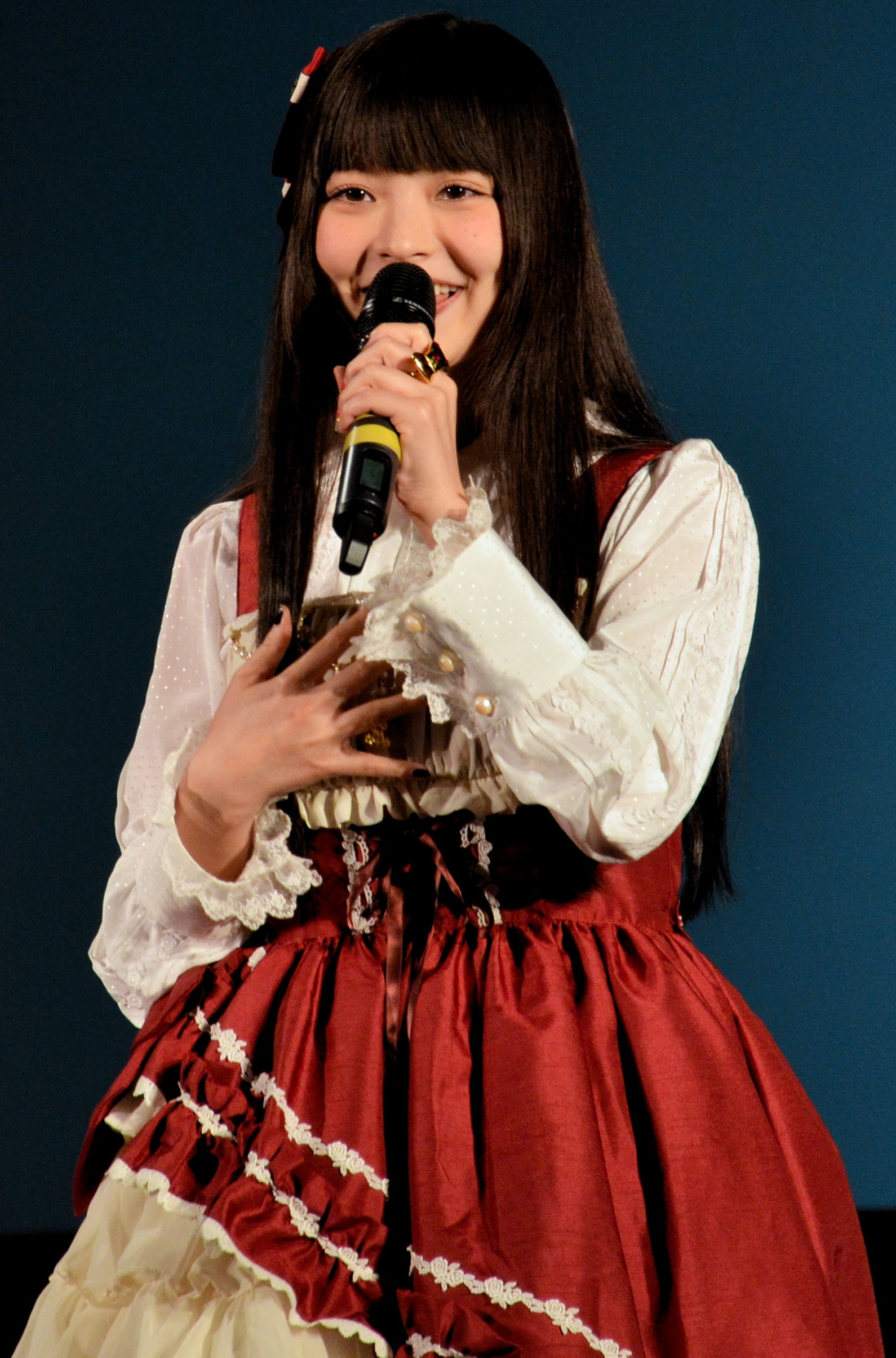
Uesaka performing at Anicon 2015

=== 2000–2009: Early modeling work ===
When Uesaka was eight years old, she was scouted by Space Craft Agency's junior talent division on her way home from taking the STEP Eiken exams. In the same year, she made her first media appearance in a Vidal Sassoon commercial, becoming the first Japanese person featured in the company's advertisements. Uesaka continued making appearances in commercials, such as Shin Megami Tensei: Devil Children – Book of Fire in 2003 and Vicks in 2009.

=== 2011–present: Voice acting career ===
In April 2011, at the age of 19, Uesaka decided to pursue voice acting and transferred to Space Craft's voice acting division. She auditioned for the anime adaptation of Listen to Me, Girls. I Am Your Father!, winning the role of Sora Takanashi, which was her first leading role in voice acting.

She voiced Nonna in Girls und Panzer and was a guest at J-Fest in Russia in November 2013.

Since October 2011, she has been the radio personality on the web radio program A&G NEXT GENERATION Lady Go!!.

On September 4, 2020, she announced that she had left Space Craft Entertainment and would become a freelancer. On March 1, 2021, she announced that she would be joining the agency Voice Kit.

== Other ventures ==
=== Modeling ===
Uesaka is a fan of lolita fashion and wore it when she started voice acting professionally. Since 2011, Uesaka has modeled for Baby, the Stars Shine Bright and made guest appearances at their events. She also modeled for the brand during their fashion runway events. In addition, she has also modeled for Metamorphose temps de fille. Uesaka has modeled in lolita fashion publications, such as Gothic & Lolita Bible, Kera, Harajuku Pop and Lapin Labyrinthe. In 2024, she produced a themed café called Twilight Rouge, with the outfits designed by lolita fashion brand Victorian Maiden.

=== Professional wrestling ===
Uesaka made her professional wrestling debut during DDT Pro-Wrestling's DDT Las Vegas Series ~ Neshin ~ event on April 20, 2025, where she won the Ironman Heavymetalweight Championship for a short time. On March 29, 2026, she regained the Ironman Heavymetalweight Championship.

==== Championships and accomplishments ====
- DDT Pro-Wrestling
  - Ironman Heavymetalweight Championship (2 times)

== Personal life ==
Uesaka cites Halko Momoi as her inspiration and became interested in voice acting after watching Nurse Witch Komugi when she was 10 years old. Since hearing the State Anthem of the USSR in her first year of high school, Uesaka became interested in Russian culture and the former Soviet Union. In April 2010, she enrolled in Faculty of Foreign Studies at Sophia University. She majored in Russian studies and graduated in March 2014.

In March 2016, after several cases of online sexual harassment, she announced that her personal Twitter account would no longer be updated, but resumed in November 2016. Her personal Twitter and Instagram were closed on July 21, 2017, after continuous harassment, after which her social media presence has been limited to a new Twitter account run by her staff.

In September 2026, her talent agency Voice Kit announced that several planned Kyoto International Manga Anime Fair appearances were cancelled following the actress receiving several email threats.

== Filmography ==
=== Anime series ===
2012

- Girls und Panzer as Nonna, Piyotan
- Kokoro Connect as Kaoru Setouchi
- Listen to Me, Girls. I Am Your Father! as Sora Takanashi
- Love, Chunibyo & Other Delusions as Sanae Dekomori
- Sengoku Collection as Annihilate Princess Mogami Yoshiaki

2013

- Fantasista Doll as Manai Hatsuki
- Genshiken Nidaime as Rika Yoshitake
- GJ-bu as Tamaki Kannazuki
- Muromi-san as Sumida
- Outbreak Company as Elvia Hanaiman

2014

- Cross Ange as Momoka Oginome
- Gonna be the Twin-Tail!! as Sōji Mitsuka (Tail Red)
- Hozuki's Coolheadedness as Peach Maki
- Inugami-san to Nekoyama-san as Yachiyo Inugami
- Lord Marksman and Vanadis as Titta
- Love, Chunibyo & Other Delusions: Heart Throb as Sanae Dekomori
- Nobunagun as Gariko
- Seitokai Yakuindomo as Vice-president Mori
- Z/X Ignition as Reia Sento

2015

- Concrete Revolutio as Kikko Hoshino
- Dog Days, Sharu
- Kantai Collection as Fubuki, Sōryū, Hiryū
- Lovely Muco as Rena-chan
- Overlord as Shalltear Bloodfallen
- Plastic Memories as Eru Miru
- Q Transformer: Saranaru Ninkimono e no Michi as Arcee
- Shimoneta: A Boring World Where the Concept of Dirty Jokes Doesn't Exist as Oboro Tsukimigusa
- Show by Rock!! as ChuChu
- Tesagure! Bukatsumono Spin-off Purupurun Sharumu to Asobou as Okonogi Tomomi
- The Idolmaster Cinderella Girls as Anastasia

2016

- Ange Vierge as Ageha Sanagi
- Concrete Revolutio: The Last Song as Kikko Hoshino
- Luck & Logic as Athena
- Myriad Colors Phantom World as Mai Kawakami
- RS Project -Rebirth Storage- as Yuzuru Midō
- Show by Rock!! Short!! as ChuChu
- Show by Rock!!# as ChuChu
- This Art Club Has a Problem! as Colette
- Tsukiuta. The Animation as Tsubaki Tendouin
- ViVid Strike! as Yumina Enclave

2017

- Aho-Girl as Disciplinary Committee President
- Battle Girl High School as Yuri Himukai
- Beyblade Burst Evolution as Ataru Okinaka
- Chaos;Child as Serika Onoe
- Chō Shōnen Tantei-dan NEO as Mayumi Hanazaki
- Hand Shakers as Chizuru
- The Idolmaster Cinderella Girls Theater as Anastasia
- In Another World with My Smartphone as Leen
- Inuyashiki as Mari Inuyashiki
- Restaurant to Another World as Aletta
- Urahara as Mari Shirako

2018

- BanG Dream! Girls Band Party! Pico and Pastel Life as Chisato Shirasagi
- Boarding School Juliet as Anne Sieber
- Himote House as Minamo Arai
- Killing Bites as Ui Inaba
- Pop Team Epic as Pipimi (Episode 3, part A) and Korona Yuhi
- Ongaku Shōjo as Kiri Mukae
- Overlord (Season 2 and 3) as Shalltear Bloodfallen
- Umamusume: Pretty Derby as Agnes Tachyon
- Fist of the Blue Sky: Regenesis as Erika Arendt
- Xuan Yuan Sword Luminary as Empress Long Cheng

2019

- Azur Lane as HMS Warspite, HMS Queen Elizabeth (1913), USS Saratoga (CV-3), IJN Akashi
- BanG Dream! 2nd Season as Chisato Shirasagi
- Carole & Tuesday as Angela Carpenter
- Grimms Notes The Animation as Curly
- Isekai Quartet as Shalltear Bloodfallen
- O Maidens in Your Savage Season as Rika Sonezaki
- Senryu Girl as Tao Hanakai
- Star Twinkle PreCure as Yuni / Cure Cosmo
- Why the Hell are You Here, Teacher!? as Kana Kojima

2020

- Asteroid in Love as Mari Morino
- BanG Dream! 3rd Season and BanG Dream! Girls Band Party! Pico: Ohmori as Chisato Shirasagi
- Fly Me to the Moon as Aya Arisugawa
- Hatena Illusion as Kokomi Kikyōin
- In/Spectre as Karin Nanase
- Iwa-Kakeru! -Sport Climbing Girls- as Konomi Kasahara
- Lapis Re:Lights as Camilla
- Rail Romanesque as Suzushiro
- Seton Academy: Join the Pack! as Anne Anetani
- Shachibato! President, It's Time for Battle! as Valmi
- Warlords of Sigrdrifa as Komachi Mikuri

2021

- Azur Lane: Slow Ahead! as IJN Akashi
- BanG Dream! Girls Band Party! Pico Fever! as Chisato Shirasagi
- Don't Toy with Me, Miss Nagatoro as Hayase Nagatoro
- Ex-Arm as Chikage Rokuoin
- Kageki Shojo!! as Sawa Sugimoto
- Kimi to Fit Boxing as Martina
- Miss Kobayashi's Dragon Maid S as Chloe
- My Next Life as a Villainess: All Routes Lead to Doom! X as Susanna Randall
- PuraOre! Pride of Orange as Maya Walker
- Restaurant to Another World 2 as Aletta
- Show by Rock!! Stars!! as ChuChu
- So I'm a Spider, So What? as Ariel
- Takt Op. Destiny as Valkyrie
- The Great Jahy Will Not Be Defeated! as Kyoko Jingu
- The Idaten Deities Know Only Peace as Nickel

2022

- Girls' Frontline as Mosin-Nagant, PPSh-41
- Hanabi-chan Is Often Late as Versus Ikusa Takanawa
- Love After World Domination as Anna Hashimoto
- Overlord IV as Shalltear Bloodfallen
- Princess Connect! Re:Dive Season 2 as Suzuna
- Shine On! Bakumatsu Bad Boys! as Akira
- Urusei Yatsura (2022) as Lum
- Yatogame-chan Kansatsu Nikki 4 Satsume as Shō Kochikashi

2023

- Don't Toy with Me, Miss Nagatoro 2nd Attack as Hayase Nagatoro
- Fly Me to the Moon 2nd Season as Aya Arisugawa
- In Another World with My Smartphone 2nd Season as Leen
- KamiKatsu as Shiruriru
- Rail Romanesque 2 as Suzushiro
- Rokudo's Bad Girls as Ranna Himawari
- Spy Classroom as Thea
- Tearmoon Empire as Mia Luna Tearmoon
- TenPuru as Kagura Baldwin
- The 100 Girlfriends Who Really, Really, Really, Really, Really Love You as Hahari Hanazono
- The Café Terrace and Its Goddesses as Kikka Makuzawa
- Yuri Is My Job! as Mitsuki Ayanokōji

2024

- Alya Sometimes Hides Her Feelings in Russian as Alisa Mikhailovna Kujou
- Grendizer U as Sayaka Yumi
- Jellyfish Can't Swim in the Night as Miiko
- Kinnikuman: Perfect Origin Arc as Meat, Bibimba
- Shaman King: Flowers as Alumi Niumbirch
- Our Last Crusade or the Rise of a New World Season 2 as Millavair Lou Nebulis VIII (young)
- Too Many Losing Heroines! as Konami Amanatsu
- Tying the Knot with an Amagami Sister as Yae Amagami

2025

- A Mangaka's Weirdly Wonderful Workplace as Nagomi Hayachine
- Bad Girl as Rin Mōri
- Hero Without a Class: Who Even Needs Skills?! as Lilia
- Ninja vs. Gokudo as Gamute
- Please Put Them On, Takamine-san as Erie Evergreen
- Puniru is a Kawaii Slime as Gelee.

2026

- Agents of the Four Seasons: Dance of Spring as Ruri Hazakura
- Magical Girl Lyrical Nanoha Exceeds Gun Blaze Vengeance as Mana Shinomiya
- Daemons of the Shadow Realm as Anna Mineyama
- One Piece as Gunko
- Patlabor EZY as Towa Kuga

2027

- Murciélago as Chiyo Yanaoka

=== Original net animation ===
- Eyedrops (2016) as Epsilon-Aminocaproic Acid
- Cute Executive Officer (2021–2023) as Yuki Karuizawa
- Ganbare Dōki-chan (2021) as Kōhai-chan
- Love Through a Prism (2026) as Catherine Astor

=== Anime films ===
- Love, Chunibyo & Other Delusions!: Rikka Version (2013) as Sanae Dekomori
- Girls und Panzer der Film (2016) as Nonna, Piyotan
- KanColle: The Movie (2016) as Fubuki, Sōryū, Hiryū
- Love, Chunibyo & Other Delusions! Take on Me (2018) as Sanae Dekomori
- BanG Dream! Film Live (2019) as Chisato Shirasagi
- Goblin Slayer: Goblin's Crown (2020) as Noble Fencer
- BanG Dream! Film Live 2nd Stage (2021) as Chisato Shirasagi
- Re:cycle of Penguindrum (2022) as Purin-Chu-Penguin
- Mobile Suit Gundam SEED Freedom (2024) as Ingrid Tradoll
- Ōmuro-ke (2024) as Megumi Sonokawa
- Umamusume: Pretty Derby – Beginning of a New Era (2024) as Agnes Tachyon
- Me & Roboco (2025) as Roboco
- Virgin Punk: Clockwork Girl (2025) as Vespa
- To You in the Beyond (2026) as Tamaki Mishima
- Armored Trooper VOTOMS: Die Graue Hexe (2026), Maintenance girl

=== Video games ===
2012

- Game Demo Papa no Iu Koto wo Kikinasai! as Sora Takanashi
- Corpse Party Anthology: Sachiko's Game of Love Hysteric Birthday 2U as Ran Kobayashi
- Kokoro Connect Yochi Random as Kaoru Setouchi
- The Idolmaster Cinderella Girls as Anastasia

2013

- Kantai Collection as Sōryū, Hiryū, Fubuki class

2014

- Chaos;Child as Onoe Serika
- Hyperdevotion Noire: Goddess Black Heart as Lid
- Danganronpa Another Episode: Ultra Despair Girls as Jataro Kemuri
- Atelier Shallie: Alchemists of the Dusk Sea as Shallotte Elminus

2015

- League of Legends as Jinx
- Xenoblade Chronicles X as Avatar voice (Japanese only)
- Battle Girl High School as Yuri Himukai

2016

- Girls' Frontline as Mosin-Nagant, Makarov, PPSh-41, AS Val, and PPS-43
- Genkai Tokki: Seven Pirates as Waffle
- Lego Dimensions as Bubbles
- Granblue Fantasy as Hallessena
- Grimms Notes as Curly
- Star Ocean: Anamnesis as Ivlish
- Onigiri Online as Oda Nobunaga
- Counter-Strike Online 2 as Yuri and Lisa
- Alternative Girls as Tsumugi Hiiragi
- Metal Waltz as Zoe Sherman

2017

- BanG Dream! Girls Band Party! as Chisato Shirasagi
- Azur Lane as USS Saratoga (CV-3), HMS Queen Elizabeth (1913), HMS Warspite (03), IJN Akashi, KMS Deutschland and SN Kirov
- Another Eden as Suzette

2018

- Food Fantasy (2018) as Osechi
- Princess Connect! Re:Dive as Suzuna / Suzuna Minami
- Street Fighter V: Arcade Edition as Falke
- Master of Eternity as Emily
- Fitness Boxing as Martina

2019

- Dead or Alive 6 as NiCO
- Project Sakura Wars as Houan Yui
- Sangokushi Heroes as Sun Shangxiang

2020

- Yakuza: Like a Dragon as Saeko Mukouda and Nanoha Mukouda
- Sdorica as PAFF
- Cytus 2 as PAFF
- Magia Record as Yuuna Kaharu
- Crash fever as Dilong Caishen
- Final Fantasy VII Remake as Kyrie Canaan
- TOUHOU Spell Bubble as Remilia Scarlet
- Fitness Boxing 2: Rhythm and Exercise as Martina

2021

- Samurai Shodown as Hibiki Takane
- Alchemy Stars as Lester, Sikare, Migard
- NEO: The World Ends with You as Kanon Tachibana
- Fate/Grand Order as Izumo no Okuni
- Umamusume: Pretty Derby as Agnes Tachyon

2022

- Goddess of Victory: Nikke as Exia, Drake
- Samurai Maiden as Hagane
- Sword Art Online: Variant Showdown as Layla

2023

- Blue Archive as Kasumi Kinugawa
- Mahjong Soul as Ransei

2024

- Like a Dragon: Infinite Wealth as Saeko Mukouda
- Final Fantasy VII Rebirth as Kyrie Canaan
- Honkai: Star Rail as Obsidian

2025

- Trickcal: Chibi Go as Xion

2026

- Genshin Impact as Odette
- Petit Planet as Tika

TBA

- Magical Girl Destroyers Kai as Peace

=== Overseas dubbing ===
2016

- The Powerpuff Girls as Bubbles (Kristen Li)

2018

- Mutafukaz as Luna

2019

- Valley of the Boom as Jenn (Siobhan Williams)

2020

- Trolls World Tour as Pennywhistle (Charlyne Yi)

2021

- Vivo as Gabi (Ynairaly Simo)
- Arcane as Powder/Jinx

2025

- The Fast and the Furious: Tokyo Drift (The Cinema edition) as Neela Ezar (Nathalie Kelley)

=== Tokusatsu ===
2021

- Ultraman Trigger: New Generation Tiga as Carmeara Voice/Human Form

2022

- Ultraman Decker as Carmeara Voice

== Other works ==
=== Web radio ===
- Web radio @ Dengeki-Bunko (うぇぶらじ@電撃文庫) (from September 2009 to December 2011)
- A&G NEXT GENERATION Lady Go!! (Nippon Cultural Broadcasting's Anime and Game Zone (超A&G+, Chō ē ando gī purasu), from October 2011 to October 2015
- Uesaka Sumire's Armored Guards Infantry Regiment Broadcast (上坂すみれの装甲親衛歩兵連隊放送) (Nico Nico Live (ニコニコ生放送), from April 2012)

== Discography ==
=== Singles ===
Year	No.	Single Details	Catalog No.	Peak Oricon Chart Positions	Album
2013	1	Nanatsu no Umi Yori Kimi no Umi (七つの海よりキミの海): Released: April 24, 2013; Label: King Records	KICM-91447 (limited), KICM-1449 (regular)	13	Kakumei Teki Broadway Shugisha Doumei (革命的ブロードウェイ主義者同盟)
2013	2	Genshi, Joshi wa, Taiyou Datta. (げんし、女子は、たいようだった。): Released: July 10, 2013; Label: King Records	KICM-91455 (limited), KICM-1457 (regular)	23	Kakumei Teki Broadway Shugisha Doumei (革命的ブロードウェイ主義者同盟)
2014	3	Parallax View (パララックス・ビュー): Released: March 5, 2014; Label: King Records	KICM-91506 (limited), KICM-1508 (regular)	14	20 Seiki no Gyakushuu (20世紀の逆襲)
2014	4	Kitare! Akatsuki no Doushi (来たれ! 暁の同志): Released: July 16, 2014; Label: King Records	KICM-91524 (limited), KICM-1525 (regular)	26	20 Seiki no Gyakushuu (20世紀の逆襲)
2014	5	Enma Daiou ni Kiite Goran (閻魔大王に訊いてごらん): Released: December 10, 2014; Label: King Records	KICM-91556 (limited), KICM-1558 (regular)	20	20 Seiki no Gyakushuu (20世紀の逆襲)
2015	6	Inner Urge: Released: July 22, 2015; Label: King Records	KICM-91617 (limited), KICM-1617 (regular)	24	20 Seiki no Gyakushuu (20世紀の逆襲)
2016	7	Koisuru Zukei (cubic futurismo) (恋する図形): Released: August 3, 2016; Label: King Records	KICM-91705 (limited), KICM-1705 (regular)	17	No Future Vacances (ノーフューチャーバカンス)
2017	8	Odore! Kyuukyoku Tetsugaku (踊れ！きゅーきょく哲学): Released: July 17, 2017; Label: King Records	KICM-91767 (limited), KICM-1767 (regular)	12	No Future Vacances (ノーフューチャーバカンス)
2017	9	Kanojo no Gensou (彼女の幻想): Released: October 18, 2017; Label: King Records	KICM-91806 (limited), KICM-1806 (regular)	11	No Future Vacances (ノーフューチャーバカンス)
2018	10	POP TEAM EPIC: Released: January 31, 2018; Label: King Records	KICM-91824 (limited), KICM-1824 (regular)	12	No Future Vacances (ノーフューチャーバカンス)
2019	11	Bon♡Kyu♡Bon wa Kare no Mono♡ (ボン♡キュッ♡ボンは彼のモノ♡): Released: April 17, 2019; Label: King Records	KICM-91917 (limited), KICM-1917 (regular)	10	NEO PROPAGANDA
2021	12	EASY LOVE: Released: April 21, 2021; Label: King Records	KICM-92079 (limited), KICM-2079 (regular)	19	
2021	13	Seikatsu Konkyu Damedinero (生活こんきゅーダメディネロ): Released: October 27, 2021; Label: King Records	KICM-92105 (limited), KICM-2105 (regular)	23	
2023	14	LOVE CRAZY: Released: February 8, 2023; Label: King Records	KICM-92123 (limited), KICM-2123 (regular)	16	
2023	15	Happyend Princess (ハッピーエンドプリンセス): Released: October 18, 2023; Label: King Records	KICM-92140 (limited), KICM-2140 (regular)		

=== Albums ===
Year	Album details	Catalog no.	Peak Oricon chart positions
2014	Kakumei Teki Broadway Shugisha Doumei (革命的ブロードウェイ主義者同盟): Released: January 8, 2014; Label: King Records; Format: CD	KICS-91983 (Limited Edition A), KICS-91984 (Limited Edition B), KICS-1983 (Regular Edition)	9
2016	20 Seiki no Gyakushuu (20世紀の逆襲): Released: January 6, 2016; Label: King Records; Format: CD	KICS-93336 (Limited Edition A), KICS-93337 (Limited Edition B), KICS-93338 (Limited Edition C), KICS-3336 (Regular Edition)	10
2018	No Future Vacances (ノーフューチャーバカンス): Released: August 1, 2018; Label: King Records; Format: CD	KICS-93726 (Limited Edition A), KICS-93727 (Limited Edition B), KICS-3726 (Regular Edition)	10
2020	Neo Propaganda: Released: January 22, 2020; Label: King Records; Format: CD	KICS-93891 (Limited Edition A), KICS-93892 (Limited Edition B), KICS-3891 (Regular Edition)	12
2022	Anthology & Destiny: Released: October 26, 2022; Label: King Records; Format: CD	KICS-94080 (Limited Edition), KICS-4080 (Regular Edition)	18

=== Character singles ===
Date released	CD name	Character (voiced by)	Song title	Used in
2011
November 9	Sora Takanashi Character Song CD (パパのいうことを聞きなさい! キャラクターソング 小鳥遊空) (KIZM-121/22)	Sora Takanashi (Sumire Uesaka)	SORAIRO (Colors of the Sky) (ソライロ, Sorairo)	A character song of Listen to Me, Girls. I Am Your Father!
2012
November 21	INSIDE IDENTITY (LACM-14026)	Black Raison d'être: Rikka Takanashi, Shinka Nibutani, Kumin Tsuyuri and Sanae Dekomori (Maaya Uchida, Chinatsu Akasaki, Azumi Asakura and Sumire Uesaka respectively)	INSIDE IDENTITY, OUTSIDER	The ending theme song of Chūnibyō Demo Koi ga Shitai!
December 26	GIRLS und PANZER ORIGINAL SOUNDTRACK (ガールズ&パンツァー オリジナルサウンドトラック) (LACA-9256)	Katyusha (Hisako Kanemoto) and Nonna (Sumire Uesaka)	Katyusha	A song used in Girls und Panzer
December 26	Dark Iris Musical Grammar (中二病でも恋がしたい! ボーカルミニアルバム 暗黒虹彩楽典) (LACA-15262)	Sanae Dekomori (Sumire Uesaka)	remmuS iroM em llac t'noD (でいなばよって☆マサリモ, Deinabayotte Masarimo), Dark Death Decoration	A character song of Chūnibyō Demo Koi ga Shitai!

=== Other appearances ===
Title	Year	Peak chart positions		Album
Title	Year	JPN	JPN Hot	Album
"Majo ni Naritai Hime ni Naritai Majo no Rhapsody" (魔女になりたい姫と姫になりたい魔女のラプソディー) (Maaya Uchida feat. Sumire Uesaka)	2017	8	10	Magic Hour
"One Way My Love" (Night Tempo feat. Sumire Uesaka)	2021	—	—	Ladies in the City
"—" denotes releases that did not chart or were not released in that region.
