= J-Fest =

Japanese culture festival held in Moscow, Russia

J-Fest J-FEST
- Frequency: Annually
- Locations: Moscow, Russia
- Inaugurated: 2009
- Attendance: Over 15,000 (2012); 16,000 (2013)
- Organiser: Embassy of Japan in Russia.
- Website: j-fest.org

J-Fest (Russian: J-FEST, formerly Фестиваль японской поп-культуры "Japanese Pop Culture Festival") is an annual event held in Moscow. The main organizer is the Embassy of Japan in Russia.

== Musical artists ==
This is a list of musical artists who have performed at the festival:

- 2010: AKB48
- 2011: Kan, May J., Haruko Momoi
- 2012: Yui Makino
- 2013: Sumire Uesaka
- 2014: Eir Aoi
