= Haruko Momoi =

Japanese singer, songwriter and voice actress (born 1977)

- 桃井 はるこ
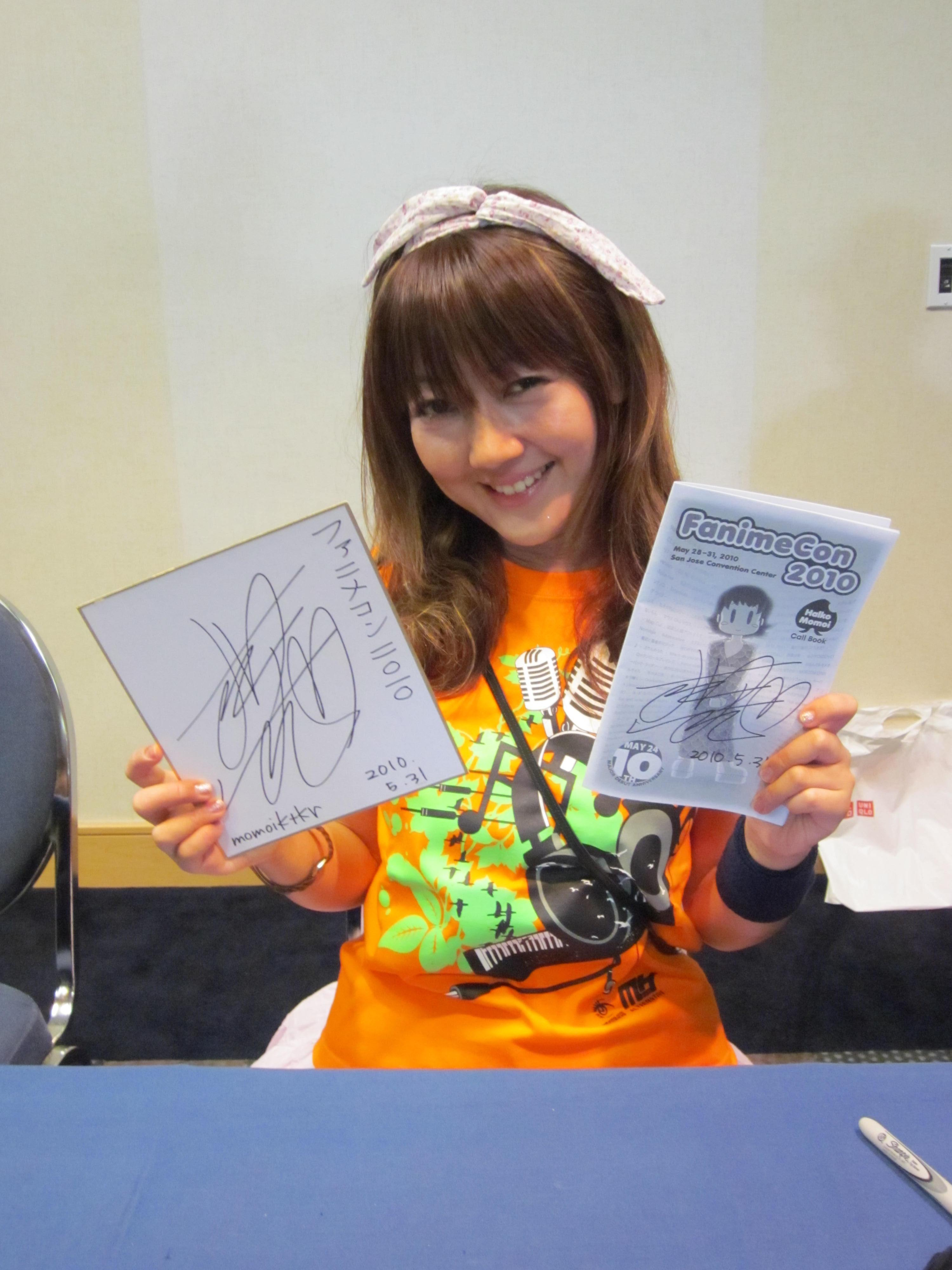
- Haruko Momoi at an autograph signing at FanimeCon 2010 in San Jose, California, U.S.
- Born: December 14, 1977 (age 48); Tokyo, Japan
- Other names: Halko; momo-i
- Occupations: Singer; songwriter; voice actress
- Years active: 2000–present
- Musical career
- Genres: J-pop; anison
- Instruments: Vocals; piano; keytar
- Label: Avex Trax
- Website: www.momoi.com

Haruko Momoi (Japanese: 桃井 はるこ, Hepburn: Momoi Haruko; born December 14, 1977) is a Japanese singer, songwriter and voice actress. She is one of the founders of an all-female pop group called Afilia Saga. She was born in Tokyo, Japan and is affectionately referred to as Halko by her fans, a nickname she gave herself which is inspired by HAL 9000, the computer in the film 2001: A Space Odyssey.

== Biography ==
=== Career ===
Haruko took interest in personal computers from a young age and studied personal computer communications during high school. After she graduated from Tokyo Metropolitan Yoyogi High School, her articles and writing on her online blog caught the attention of the chief editor of the Weekly ASCII magazine. She was later offered a job as a writer for the magazine.

During the late nineties, Haruko began singing and doing live performances on the streets of Harajuku and Akihabara. She then debuted her single "Mail Me," a cover version of which appears in the movie Suicide Circle in 2001. Soon after, she debuted as a voice actress for her role as Komugi Nakahara in Nurse Witch Komugi. In 2001, she paired with Masaya Koike to form the duo UNDER17 and together performed songs for adult and mainstream video games and anime. After their last album Best Album 3 ~Soshite Densetsu e...~ and a live tour of the same name, UNDER17 separated in 2004 citing creative differences, and the two musicians have since gone their separate ways. She continued on with her solo singing career and in 2006, was signed under avex mode as a music composer and singer.

In 2007, Halko published an autobiography entitled Akihaba-LOVE, in which she tells of the major experiences that shaped her life, mainly those that were important in constructing her career as a musician and voice actress, but it also includes anecdotes from her childhood and stories of friendship, as well as personal opinions on different aspects of anime fandom.

== Filmography ==
=== Anime ===
2001

- Final Fantasy: Unlimited (Ai Hayakawa)
- The SoulTaker (Komugi Nakahara)

2002

- Ai Yori Aoshi (Chika Minazuki)
- Galaxy Angel A (Announcer)
- Gravion (Doria)
- UFO Ultramaiden Valkyrie (Maru)

2003

- Ai Yori Aoshi:Enishi (Chika Minazuki)
- Bottle Fairy (Tama-chan)
- Da Capo (Utamaru)
- Popotan (Mii)
- Mahoromatic: Summer Special (Shi Ho)
- Mouse (Samantha Morijima in Ep. 12)

2004

- DearS (China)
- Gravion Zwei (Doria)
- Kujibiki Unbalance (Shinobu Enomoto)
- Paranoia Agent (Maromi)
- Ragnarok The Animation (Maya)
- Ryūsei Sentai Musumet (Kō Saotome)

2005

- Da Capo Second Season (Utamaru)

2006

- Blackjack 21 (Suzie)
- Lovely Idol (Mai Nonomiya)
- Magikano (Marin Nijihara)

2007

- Code-E (Keiko Komatsuna)
- Prism Ark (Filia)
- My Bride Is a Mermaid (San Seto)

2008

- Mission-E (Keiko Komatsuna)
- Tales of the Abyss (Anise Tatlin)

2011

- Steins;Gate (Faris NyanNyan)

2014

- Wonder Momo (Original Wonder Momo)

2017

- Akiba's Trip: The Animation (Momo Tsukumo)

2018

- Steins;Gate 0 (Faris NyanNyan)

=== OVA ===
- Majokko Tsukune-chan (Tsukune)
- Netrun-mon (Chiyu)
- Nurse Witch Komugi (Komugi Nakahara/Magical Nurse Komugi)
- Nurse Witch Komugi-Chan Magikarte Z (Komugi Nakahara/Magical Nurse Komugi)
- Moekan (Moe no Mikoto)

=== Anime Movie ===
- Camp Pikachu (Wynaut)

=== Tokusatsu ===
- Unofficial Sentai Akibaranger (herself)
  - Unofficial Sentai Akibaranger Season Two (Yuru-Chara Jigen)

=== Games ===
- Baldr Force EXE (Baschiera)
- BALDR BULLET "REVELLION" (Asou Natsume)
- D.C.P.S.: Da Capo Plus Situation (Utamaru)
- D.C. Four Seasons: Da Capo Four Seasons (Utamaru)
- DearS (China)
- Nurse Witch Komugi (Komugi Nakahara/Magical Nurse Komugi)
- Prism Ark (Filia)
- Prism Ark -AWAKE- (Filia)
- Queen's Gate: Spiral Chaos (Wonder Momo)
- Steins;Gate (Feiris Nyannyan)
- Steins;Gate - Darling of Loving Vows (Feiris Nyannyan)
- Steins;Gate - Linear Bounded Phenogram (Feiris Nyannyan)
- Steins;Gate 0 (Feiris Nyannyan)
- Stella Deus: The Gate of Eternity (Tia)
- Tales of the Abyss (Anise Tatlin)
- Tales of the World: Radiant Mythology 2 (Anise Tatlin)
- Tales of the World: Radiant Mythology 3 (Anise Tatlin)
- Tales of Fandom Vol.2 (Anise Tatlin)
- Phantasy Star Online 2 (Lottie)
- Yunyun Syndrome!? Rhythm Psychosis (Yunyun)

=== Miscellaneous ===
- Kawaii! JeNny (Sister B)

=== Radio ===
- Kageyama ☆ Momoi no Baisoku Moe-Chan Neru
- Popo-Radi (Ended)
- Ragnarok Online: THE RADIO (Ended)
- Ura Momoi (Ended)
- Prism Knight (Ended)
- TOKYO→NIIGATA MUSIC CONVOY (January, 2006)
- Momoi Haruko no Chō! Momoi
- Momoi Haruko no Radio ☆ UP DATE (Ended)
- avex presents Momoi Haruko no NikoNiko RADIO
- avex presents Momoi Haruko no FumuFumu RADIO
- My Bride Is a Mermaid: Yomeiri Radio (Ended)

=== Drama CD ===
- Ai Yori Aoshi series (Chika Minazuki)
- Tales of the Abyss series (Anise Tatlin)
- Prism Ark Special Sound Package (Filia)
- Prism Ark Drama CD: Sister Hell Prism Variation (Filia)
- Ragnarok The Animation Ver.1-Ver.3 (Maya)
- Poporaji (Mii)

=== Television ===
- D's Garage21 (TV Asahi, ended)
- Anime TV (Guest)
- AniPara Music-place (Guest)
- Geki☆Ten (Guest)
- Akiba!AKIBA☆Akiba (Guest)
- Anime Tengoku (Guest, regular from October 2007)
- HOT WAVE (TV Saitama, guest)
- JoyPopTune (TV Saitama)
- @Tunes. (tvk, guest)

== Discography ==
=== Singles ===
Date Released	Single Name
May 24, 2000	Mail Me
July 27, 2005	Ton Dol Baby (トンドルベイビー)
October 19, 2005	WONDER MOMO-i~New recording~
November 8, 2006	Saigo no Rock (さいごのろっく)
December 6, 2006	Yume no Baton (ゆめのばとん)
December 27, 2006	Enter!
March 28, 2007	21 Seiki (21世紀)
October 10, 2007	Party!
October 25, 2007	Yuuen no Amulet/Opera Fantasia (悠遠のアミュレット/オペラファンタジア)
October 25, 2007	R・G・B...
November 14, 2007	Lumica (ルミカ)
April 29, 2009	Ruujii Guujii (るーじー・ぐーじー)
June 17, 2009	☆Jien Otsu☆Song (☆自演乙☆ソング)
March 2, 2011	Yoake no Samba (夜明けのサンバ)
June 22, 2011	Ganbare... Sore wa, I Love You (がんばれ...それは、I Love You)
May 23, 2012	Hikounin Sentai Akibaranger (非公認戦隊アキバレンジャー)
June 7, 2017	Junai Marionette (純愛マリオネット)
November 8, 2017	Hoshizora Dancing (星空ダンシング)

=== Albums ===
Date Released	Album Name
August 9, 2006	momo-i quality
February 21, 2007	Haruko☆UP DATE SONGS BEST (はるこ☆UP DATE SONGS BEST)
March 21, 2007	Famison 8BIT (ファミソン8BIT)
June 8, 2007	Famison 8BIT STAGE2 (ファミソン8BIT STAGE2)
June 20, 2007	COVER BEST - Cover Densha (COVER BEST カバー電車)
March 5, 2008	Sunday early morning
December 3, 2008	more&more quality RED ~Anime song cover~
December 3, 2008	more&more quality WHITE ~Self song cover~
September 30, 2009	Henji Ga Nai, Tada No Shitsuren No Youda (へんじがない、ただのしつれんのようだ。)
September 15, 2010	IVY ~Aibii~ (IVY 〜アイビー〜)
August 24, 2011	Showa (しょうわ)
October 24, 2012	'Angya' Momo-i's World Tour (あんぎゃ 〜モモーイ世界の旅〜)
October 21, 2015	STAY GOLD
July 20, 2016	Pink Hippo Album ~Self Cover Best~
August 8, 2018	pearl

=== Anime Singles ===
Date Released	Single Name
November 1, 2006	LoveLoveLove no Sei na no yo! (LoveLoveLoveのせいなのよ!)
April 25, 2007	Romantic Summer
May 23, 2007	your gravitation
August 22, 2007	Dan Dan Dan
August 27, 2008	Feel So Easy

=== DVD ===
- momo-i Live DVD (avex mode)
- Haruko☆UP DATE (Pony Canyon)
- CLIP BEST (avex mode)

Simultaneous release with the album Sunday early morning on March 5, 2008, with the making-of of her PVs and image collection.

=== Book ===
- Akihaba LOVE ~Akihabara to issho ni otona ni natta~

== Convention appearances ==
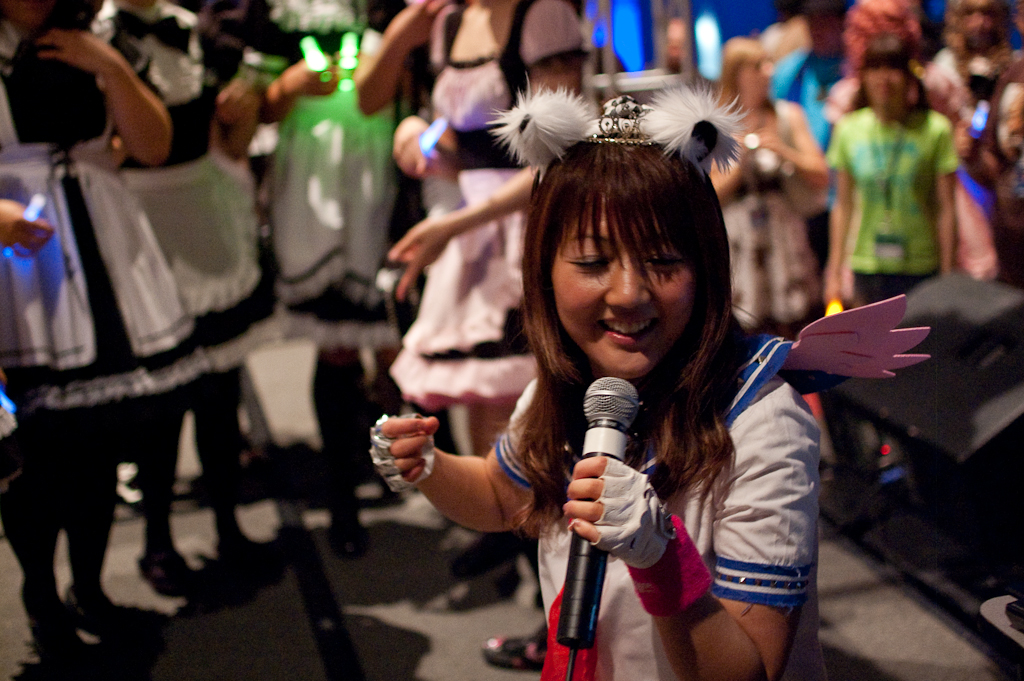
Momoi performs at FanimeCon 2010.

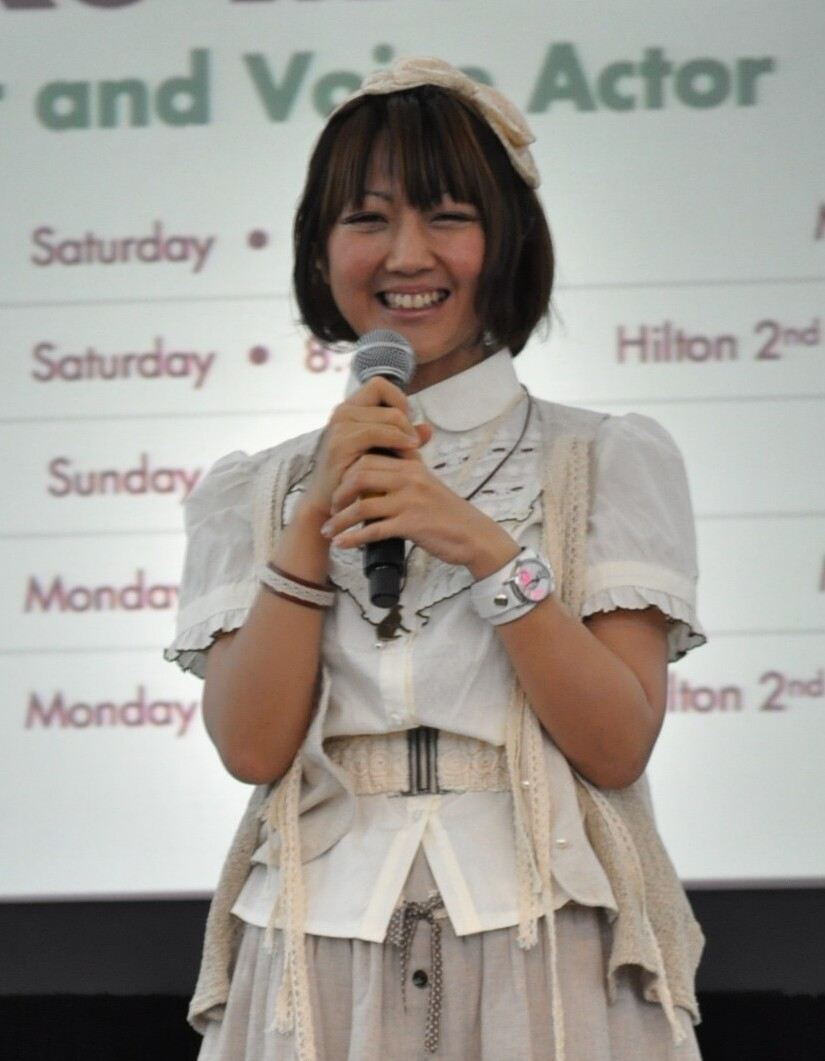
Momoi at FanimeCon 2011

Momoi has appeared in various convention concerts outside Japan. To date, she has visited the United States, Germany, Canada, Mexico, Finland, the United Kingdom and Russia.

- Anime Expo 2007, Long Beach, California: June 29 - July 2, 2007
- Connichi 2007, Kassel, Germany: September 7–9, 2007
- Anime North 2008, Toronto, Ontario, Canada: May 23–25, 2008
- Connichi 2008, Kassel, Germany: September 12–14, 2008
- FanimeCon 2009, San Jose, California: May 22–25, 2009
- Aya Revolution 2009, Coventry, United Kingdom: August 14–16, 2009
- Anime Vegas 2009, Las Vegas, Nevada: September 5–7, 2009
- FanimeCon 2010, San Jose, California: May 28–31, 2010
- Desucon 2010, Lahti, Finland: June 12–13, 2010
- Momo-i Night Fest 2010, Las Vegas, Nevada: June 19, 2010
- J-popcon 2010, Copenhagen, Denmark: November 13, 2010
- FanimeCon 2011, San Jose, California: May 27–30, 2011
- Japan Expo 2011, Paris, France: June 30-July 3, 2011
- Otakuthon 2011, Montreal, Quebec, Canada: August 12-August 14, 2011
- JapanDay 2011, Düsseldorf, Germany: October 15-October 16, 2011
- J-Fest 2011, Moscow, Russia: November 19-November 20, 2011
- Anime Boston 2012, Boston, Massachusetts: April 6–8, 2012
- SMASH! Sydney Manga and Anime Show 2013, Sydney, Australia: August 10, 2013
- Idol Matsuri 2014, Silverdale, Washington: June 20–22, 2014
