= Grimms Notes =

Japanese video game and anime series

グリムノーツ (Gurimu Nōtsu)
- Video game
- Developer: Genki
- Publisher: Square Enix
- Genre: Role-playing
- Platform: Android, iOS
- Released: JP: January 21, 2016; US: March 2, 2018
- Anime television series

Grimms Notes: The Animation
- Directed by: Seiki Sugawara
- Written by: Hiroshi Yamaguchi
- Music by: Taketeru Sunamori; Mirai Kodai Gakudan
- Studio: Brain's Base
- Licensed by: NA: Sentai Filmworks
- Original network: TBS, BS-TBS
- Original run: JP: January 10, 2019; US: June 1, 2020; –: JP: March 28, 2019; US: November 4, 2020
- Episodes: 12
- Video game

Grimms Notes Repage
- Developer: Genki
- Publisher: Square Enix
- Genre: Role-playing
- Platform: Android, iOS
- Released: JP: January 29, 2018

Grimms Notes (グリムノーツ, Gurimu Nōtsu) was an online free-to-play role-playing game developed by Genki and published by Square Enix. It was released in Japan on January 21, 2016, for Android and iOS devices. The game was released worldwide on March 2, 2018, in South Korea, China, North America and Europe by Flero Games, a Korean publisher. An anime television series adaptation by Brain's Base, titled Grimms Notes: The Animation, premiered from January 10 to March 28, 2019; the anime series is licensed in North America by Sentai Filmworks.

The game ended service on June 17, 2020. It was planned to end service on April 30, 2020, but the date was delayed due to COVID-19 pandemic.

== Gameplay ==
Grimms Notes is a side-scrolling role-playing game. The player controls a party of characters based on fairy tales and stories such as Little Red Riding Hood and Cinderella. The player directly controls the main character, moving them around the battle screen and attacking enemies, while the game controls the other party members. As characters defeat enemies they charge a skill meter, with the player activating the character's unique skill, both for the main character and others, when fully charged.

The game features a "Soul System", wherein each character has two "souls" equipped, equivalent to jobs or character classes. In between battles the player can change which souls are equipped.

== Plot ==
In the game, the player and the fairy tale characters band together to combat "Chaos Tellers", which are rewriting the fairy tale stories and changing fate. Fairy tales include characters from such stories as Alice in Wonderland, Cinderella, and Little Red Riding Hood.

== Release ==
The game was released in Japan on January 21, 2016, for Android and iOS devices. It was released worldwide on March 2, 2018, in South Korea, China, North America and Europe by Flero Games, a Korean publisher. On January 10, 2019, the global version was shut down. The Japanese version closed its services on June 17, 2020. It was planned to end service on April 30, 2020, but the date was delayed due to COVID-19 pandemic. Later, a free offline application was released, which made it available to read every cutscene ever released without the gameplay. It is now considered a visual novel.

== Reception ==
The game was downloaded two million times in four days, and over 15 million times total in Japan.

== Other media ==
=== Anime ===
An anime television series adaptation titled Grimms Notes: The Animation was announced in 2018, which Square Enix had indicated that it would not be a short-form anime series. The series premiered from January 10 to March 28, 2019, on TBS and BS-TBS. The series is animated by Brain's Base and is directed by Seiki Sugawara, with Hiroshi Yamaguchi handling series composition, Kentaro Matsumoto handling character designs, and Fumiyuki Go is the sound director. Ayana Taketatsu performs the series' opening theme song "Innocent Notes", while i☆Ris performs the series' ending theme song "Endless Notes". In North America, Crunchyroll simulcasts the series and Sentai Filmworks will release the series on home video.

==== Cast ====
Ekusu (エクス)
Voiced by: Ryōta Ōsaka
Known as Ex for short, a resident from Cinderella story, whose book of fate was blank, he is Attacker class.
Reina Viehmann (レイナ・フィーマン)
Voiced by: Reina Ueda
A resident from an unknown story, she is the leader of the group, her purpose is to "tune" every stories back to normal and stop Chaos Storyteller from destroying it, she is Healer class.
Tao (タオ)
Voiced by: Takuya Eguchi
A resident from Momotaro story and a friend of previous Momotaro, he is Defender class.
Shane (シェイン)
Voiced by: Miyu Kubota
A resident from Momotaro story as well, she was a demon with no horns as remembered by Onihime, she is Shooter class.
Loki (ロキ)
Voiced by: Takahiro Mizushima
Curly (カーリー)
Voiced by: Sumire Uesaka
Cinderella (シンデレラ)
Voiced by: Reina Ueda
Akazukin (赤ずきん) / Red Riding Hood
Voiced by: Risa Taneda
Shirayuki-hime (白雪姫) / Snow White
Voiced by: Aoi Yūki
Robin Hood (ロビン・フッド)
Voiced by: Junji Majima
Alice (アリス)
Voiced by: Miyu Kubota

==== Episode list ====
No.	Title (Note: All English titles are taken from Crunchyroll.)	Original release date
1	"Red Riding Hood's Forest"; Transliteration: "Akazukin no mori" (Japanese: 赤ずきんの森)	January 10, 2019
2	"Don Quixote's Faith"; Transliteration: "Don kihōte no shin'nen" (Japanese: ドン・キホーテの信念)	January 17, 2019
3	"Cinderella of Recollection"; Transliteration: "Tsuioku no Shinderera" (Japanese: 追憶のシンデレラ)	January 24, 2019
4	"Ex's Journey Begins"; Transliteration: "Ekusu no tabidachi" (Japanese: エクスの旅立ち)	January 31, 2019
5	"Treasure Island, a Place of Dreams and Adventure"; Transliteration: "Yume to roman no takarajima" (Japanese: 夢とロマンの宝島)	February 7, 2019
6	"Ex and Snow White"; Transliteration: "Ekusu to shirayukihime" (Japanese: エクスと白雪姫)	February 14, 2019
7	"Gerda and the Snow Queen"; Transliteration: "Geruda to yuki no joō" (Japanese: ゲルダと雪の女王)	February 21, 2019
8	"The Brother and Sister of Onigashima"; Transliteration: "Onigashima no kyōdai" (Japanese: 鬼ヶ島の兄妹)	February 28, 2019
9	"Aladdin of the Burning Sand"; Transliteration: "Nessa no Arajin" (Japanese: 熱砂のアラジン)	March 7, 2019
10	"The Saint of Orléans"; Transliteration: "Orurean no seijo" (Japanese: オルレアンの聖女)	March 14, 2019
11	"Reina in Wonderland"; Transliteration: "Fushiginokuni no Reina" (Japanese: 不思議の国のレイナ)	March 21, 2019
12	"A Fairy Tale Nobody Knows"; Transliteration: "Daremo shiranai dōwa" (Japanese: 誰も知らない童話)	March 28, 2019

== Other works ==
Another game under development called Grimms Echoes, will be one series but not direct sequel to Grimms Notes as it develops a completely new story. It scheduled to release on March 28, 2019.
