= Under17 =

Japanese musical duo

UNDER17
- Also known as: Poly-Phonic
- Origin: Tokyo, Japan
- Genres: J-pop; pop rock; anime song
- Years active: 2001–2004
- Label: Lantis
- Past members: Haruko Momoi; Masaya Koike

Under17 (stylized as UNDER17) was a Japanese musical duo formed in 2001 by Haruko Momoi and Masaya Koike. The group was known for producing music known colloquially as "moe songs", providing theme and insert songs to series such as Tenbatsu! Angel Rabbie, Popotan, and DearS.

== History ==
Some of the anime series where Under17 songs have been featured are Mouse, Popotan, Tenbatsu! Angel Rabbie, Hourglass of Summer, DearS, and Kujibiki Unbalance. This group has released several adult videogames' opening songs. On 27 September 2004, it was announced that Under17 would break up after their national tour, with Momoi and Koike going separate ways due to creative differences. Their final concert was held on 20 November 2004 at the Yokohama Blitz. Momoi officially embarked on a solo career and Koike formed the moe-pop band MOSAIC.WAV.

The band reunited for one song on 31 August 2008 during the Animelo Summer Live, performing "Tenbatsu! Angel Rabbie" with the members of MOSAIC.WAV.

Momoi and Koike briefly reunited again in March 2020 to perform at the event Susume Moe Denpa Shōnen!! Daifukkatsusai 2020!!: Sugisarishi Moe o Motomete.

== Members ==
- Haruko Momoi (桃井はるこ) (vocals)
- Masaya Koike (小池雅也) (guitar)

== Discography ==
=== Compilation albums ===
Title	Year	Details	Peak chart positions	Sales
Title	Year	Details	JPN	Sales
Under17 Best Album 1: Bishōjo Game Song ni Ai o! (UNDER17 BEST ALBUM1 美少女ゲームソングに愛を!)	2003	Released: 3 December 2003; Label: Lantis; Formats: CD	93	—
Under17 Best Album 2: Moe Song o Kiwameruzo! (UNDER17 BEST ALBUM2 萌えソングをきわめるゾ!)	2004	Released: 21 January 2004; Label: Lantis; Formats: CD	50	—
Under17 Best Album 3: Soshite Densetsu e... (UNDER17 BEST ALBUM3 そして伝説へ…)	2004	Released: 22 December 2004; Label: Lantis; Formats: CD	55	—
"—" denotes releases that did not chart or were not released in that region.

=== Singles ===
Title	Year	Peak position	Sales
Title	Year	JPN	Sales
"Mouse Chu Mouse" (マウス Chu マウス)	2003	68	—
"Popotan E.P." (ぽぽたんe.p.) (with Funta)	2003	—	—
"Love Slave" (ラブスレイブ)	2004	55	—
"Kujibiki Unbalance" (くじびきアンバランス)	2004	68	—
"—" denotes releases that did not chart or were not released in that region.
