= Mouse (manga) =

Japanese manga series

- First tankōbon volume cover
- Genre: Action, comedy
- Manga
- Written by: Satoru Akahori
- Illustrated by: Hiroshi Itaba
- Published by: Hakusensha
- Imprint: Jets Comics
- Magazine: Young Animal
- Original run: November 26, 1999 – September 10, 2004
- Volumes: 14
- Anime television series
- Directed by: Yorifusa Yamaguchi
- Produced by: Tetsurou Satomi; Katsuhara Nagata; Ryou Tomoda
- Written by: Hiroyuki Kawasaki
- Music by: Naoki Satō
- Studio: Studio Deen
- Licensed by: NA: Media Blasters
- Original network: Chiba TV, TV Saitama, TV Kanagawa, MTV, Kids Station
- Original run: January 6, 2003 – March 24, 2003
- Episodes: 12
- Light novel
- Written by: Gō Zappa
- Illustrated by: Hiroshi Itaba
- Published by: Fujimi Shobo
- Published: January 31, 2003
- Volumes: 1
- Manga

Mouse Bakumatsu-den
- Written by: Satoru Akahori
- Illustrated by: Hiroshi Itaba
- Published by: Hakusensha
- Published: December 20, 2005
- Volumes: 1
- icon

Mouse (stylized as MØUSE) is a Japanese manga series written by Satoru Akahori and illustrated by Hiroshi Itaba. It was serialized in Hakusensha's seinen manga Young Animal from 1999 and 2004, with its chapters collected in fourteen tankōbon volumes. A 12-episode anime television series, directed by Yorifusa Yamaguchi and animated by Studio Deen was broadcast in 2003. The anime series was licensed in North America by Media Blasters.

== Plot ==
For 400 years, there was a family of thieves stealing money and priceless property, particularly those items that were originally illegally stolen. The main motivation is that anything and everything can be stolen, no matter how much they protect that item. And in those years, that thief was only known by one name, Mouse.

In the latest version, a young college art teacher named Muon Sorata is the latest to take up the name of Mouse. He is surrounded by three highly devoted and attractive assistants who help him pull off heists of art museums and landmark towers. The thieves have the power and resources to steal entire buildings and take structures out to sea but never get caught. Mouse is also known for not abandoning those who serve him, even if it means his capture.

== Characters ==
=== Mouse Team ===
Sorata Muon (無音 宙太, Muon Sorata)
Voiced by: Kappei Yamaguchi (Japanese); Grant George (English)
A college art teacher who is actually a thief under the name "Mouse". He follows a 400-year tradition as Mouse and will not abandon those who serve him. As Mouse, Sorata has access to a vast arsenal of vehicles and machines to help him, all of which are hidden underneath the college where he works. At school he is usually seen messing up with his teacher duties, gaining a stern lecture from Mei, Yayoi and Hazuki (with everyone unaware of their relationship with him). He is a popular teacher, gaining attraction from many of his female students. Though he usually tries to avoid having sex, after becoming drunk he obtains a limitless libido, sleeping with countless women, as well as wearing out the usually sex driven Mei, Yayoi and Kakio with no sights of slowing down; however after he sobers up, he does not remember anything he did. He is friends with Inspector Minami and his daughter Rika, who he sees like a family, though they are unaware he is Mouse.
Mei Momozono (桃園 メイ, Momozono Mei)
Voiced by: Kikuko Inoue (Japanese); Jessica Gee (English)
A computer and physics expert, who works at the college's physics department as a math teacher. She had been trained since childhood to be the servant to Sorata, but decided that she would not follow Mouse blindly until she saw him herself, even planning to kill herself if she was made to follow a man she did not respect. When she was injured during a mission, she made the choice to follow Sorata with her heart when he would not abandon her, in spite of her insistence that he do. Her grandfather is the chairman of the school, though the school itself is owned by the Muon family. As the first servant to meet Sorata, she is incredibly loyal to him. As the series progressed she came to realize that she is in love with him, showing jealousy when he goes on dates and being the most worried during his more dangerous heists.
Yayoi Kuribayashi (栗林 弥生, Kuribayashi Yayoi)
Voiced by: Yukari Fukui (Japanese); Cindy Robinson (English)
A biology expert, so skilled that when she was hired on to the research team, they made sure to staff the team with only females just for her, and is also the college's nurse. When she was a college student, Yayoi was cursed with a fear of men so great that she goes into panic attacks whenever she even sees a man. So she was curious that her classmate, Mei Momozona, engaged in an intimate relationship with a student she was tutoring, Sorata Muon. But later, when a valuable sample was targeted by Mouse to be stolen, Yayoi found herself trapped when one of her panic attacks triggered a major fire in the lab she was in. It was Sorata, who was really Mouse, who had rescued her and allowed her to come out of her shell. She is one of his most devoted servants, and is always trying to make him some concoction to give him more sexual energy. Of Mouse's three servants, Yayoi is the most sexually driven, regularly showing a strong masochistic-side from various fantasies of bondage and the likes with Mouse.
Hazuki Kakio (柿生 葉月, Kakio Hadzuki)
Voiced by: Mai Nakahara (Japanese); Stephanie Sheh (English)
An expert martial arts fighter, who is also the college's physical education instructor. There are several personalities within her, from a mischievous child to a brave fighter. When Hazuki foolishly tested a memory-erasing machine and her many personalities were programmed into its computer, Sorata went in to save her by going in himself. While Sorata went in search of the Kakio family treasure, he discovered Hazuki in what seemed to be a debilitated, emotionally fractured, and dissociated state where she was forced to be completely cut off from the rest of the world. By gaining her trust and promising never to leave her as her family had, Sorata was about to uncover the secret and truth behind the Kakio family treasure. She has a habit of appearing in the strangest places (bathroom, washing machine, etc) while wearing only a kinbaku as well as having a penchant for cosplay.

=== School ===
Mr. Fuyuharu
Principal of the school and grandfather to Mei. He is very proud to be serving the Muon family as well as taking care of the school, which the Muon family owns. He often asks Sorata if there is anything he could possibly do to be of service to him, and becomes really worried if he believes he has done something to upset him.
Machiko Tsukioka
She seems to be the leader of three girls that attend Sorata's art class and are fans of the notorious Mouse. She has obvious feelings for Sorata, getting jealous at the thought of him having a girlfriend.

=== Police ===
Captain Onizuka Heitaro
He is completely driven to capture Mouse at all cost. He gets extremely angry at how the media always poses Mouse as something of a hero figure and how Mouse always manages to escape.
Masatoshi Minami
The Captain's assistant and does his best to try to calm the Captain's outbursts when trying to capture Mouse. He has a daughter named Rika and is friends with Sorata, but he is unaware of his true identity.

=== Other ===
Rika Minami
Nine-year-old daughter of Inspector Minami and friends with Sorata. She is unaware that Sorata is Mouse though she has a crush on him, stating that she will become his bride once she grows up. She owns a golden-hair cat that Mouse stole and gave to her for her birthday after dying its hair black (though he told her in secret what it really was).
Natsuko Muon
She is Sorata's step mother that seems to have a lustful attraction to her step son not unlike his slaves. She is only four years older than he is and she revealed that before she became Sorata's stepmother, she was one of his father's slaves, sparking hope in Mei, Yayoi and Kakio at the idea to being more than a slave to him.

=== 4S ===
An organization originally created to protect valuable artwork out of the hands of thieves. However, the organization has lost its way and has become the largest black market dealers of stolen artwork as well as assassins. They are the primary antagonists in the series.

== Media ==
=== Manga ===
Written by Satoru Akahori and illustrated by Hiroshi Itaba, Mouse was serialized in Hakusensha's seinen manga magazine Young Animal from November 26, 1999, (Note: The series debuted in the magazine's 23rd issue of 1999, released on November 26 of that same year.) to September 10, 2004. (Note: It finished in the magazine's 18th issue of 2004, released on September 10 of that same year.) Hakusensha collected its chapters in fourteen tankōbon volumes, released from April 28, 2000, to October 29, 2004. An extra prequel volume, titled Mouse: Bakumatsu-den (マウス ～幕末伝～), was published on December 20, 2005.

=== Novel ===
A novel written by Gō Zappa and illustrated by Itaba was published by Fujimi Shobo on January 31, 2003.

=== Anime ===
A 12-episode anime television series, television series directed by Yorifusa Yamaguchi, written by Hiroyuki Kawasaki, produced by Media Factory and animated by Studio Deen, was broadcast on Chiba TV, TV Saitama, TV Kanagawa, MTV, and Kids Station from January 6 to March 24, 2003. (Note: Chiba TV listed the series air dates on Sunday at 24:30, which is effectively Monday at 00:30 a.m. JST.) The opening theme song is "Mouse Chu Mouse" (マウス Chu マウス, Mausu Chu Mausu) and the ending theme song "Intellimouse" (い・ん・て・り MOUSE, Interi Mausu), both performed by Under17.

In North America, the anime was licensed by Media Blasters. The series was released on two DVD sets on April 13 and June 15, 2004, respectively. A complete DVD set was released on December 19, 2006.

==== Episodes ====
- Note: All episodes are labeled as "Steal".

| No. | Title | Original release date |
|---|---|---|
| 1 | "My Name Is "Mouse""; Transliteration: "Sono na wa Mausu" (Japanese: その名は"鼠(マウス)") | January 6, 2003 |
The pilot episode, in which Mouse steals not only a Golden Skull but the entire Museum. After this, Mei, Yayoi and Hazuki are introduced as servants to Sorata (aka Mouse). After a scene in which all three girls attempt to get Sorata to "punish them", the detective pursuing Mouse is seen on television, challenging the thief to steal the newly built Odaiba Tower.
| 2 | "There Is Nothing Mouse Cannot Steal"; Transliteration: "Mausu ni Nusu Menu Mono wa Nashi" (Japanese: 鼠(マウス)に盗めぬ物はなし) | January 13, 2003 |
Mouse has to steal the newly built Odaiba Tower.
| 3 | "She Will Not Accept Her Fate"; Transliteration: "Kanojo wa Sadame o Ukeirenai" (Japanese: 彼女は運命(さだめ)を受け入れない) | January 20, 2003 |
Mouse has to steal and go on a date on the same night.
| 4 | "Mouse Does Not Betray His Own"; Transliteration: "Mausu wa Nakama o Misutenai" (Japanese: 鼠(マウス)は仲間を見捨てない) | January 27, 2003 |
Mei Momozono's history is revealed.
| 5 | "The Target Is Hazuki"; Transliteration: "Tāgetto wa Hazuki" (Japanese: ターゲットは葉月) | February 4, 2003 |
Hazuki acts as a test subject for a new machine for Mouse.
| 6 | "Mouse In The Electric Kingdom"; Transliteration: "Denshi no Kuni no Mausu" (Japanese: 電子の国の鼠(マウス)) | February 11, 2003 |
Mouse goes into VR to save Hazuki from being trapped in the new machine.
| 7 | "Man Hating Co-ed"; Transliteration: "Otokogirai no Joshidai-sei" (Japanese: 男嫌いの女子大生) | February 18, 2003 |
Yayoi's history is revealed.
| 8 | "A Sweet Awakening"; Transliteration: "Kanbinaru Kakusei" (Japanese: 甘美なる覚醒) | February 25, 2003 |
Yayoi is recruited into Mouse's team on a heist to steal the Rainbow Grass.
| 9 | "His Name is Woof"; Transliteration: "Sono na wa 'Wan'" (Japanese: その名は"ワン") | March 3, 2003 |
Woof of the Force Organisation has his two servants capture and impersonate Hazuki and Yayoi.
| 10 | "The Man Who Won't Die"; Transliteration: "Shinanai Otoko" (Japanese: 死なない男) | March 10, 2003 |
After Mouse succeeds in stealing the Heaven's Clock, Woof (revealed to be immortal) ambushes him.
| 11 | "Mouse Never Gives Up!"; Transliteration: "Mausu wa Kesshite Akiramenai" (Japanese: "鼠(マウス)"は決してあきらめない) | March 17, 2003 |
Woof is on the verge of killing Mouse and his servants, but Machiko and Captain Onizuka intervene, allowing Mouse to finish Woof off.
| 12 | "Mouse's Dreams Live"; Transliteration: "Mausu no Yume wa Owaranai" (Japanese: "鼠(マウス)"の夢は終わらない) | March 24, 2003 |
Mouse finds himself being hounded by his servants and Machiko for his affection. After some quality time with Woof, Mouse has the time of his life.
