= Shinichiro Kimura =

Japanese anime director

Shinichiro Kimura (木村 真一郎, Kimura Shin'ichirō, born October 4) is a Japanese anime storyboard artist and director from Hiroshima Prefecture. His nickname is Kimushin (キムシン), a shortened version of his name.

== Early life ==
Kimura graduated from Osaka University of Arts with a major in oil painting. He enrolled in a fine arts college to get a teaching certificate in art. While in school, he was a member of CAS, an animation research society, and was classmates with animation director Takao Kado.

== Career ==
After graduating university, Kimura worked at Studio World. Formerly an animator, he first worked as a director on an adult work, and has been working as a director ever since.

He began his career as a storyboard artist and director, and made his directorial debut in 1998 with Burn-Up Excess. Some of his best-known works as a director include Hand Maid May (2000) and A Little Snow Fairy Sugar (2001).

== Filmography ==
=== As director ===
- Burn-Up Excess (1998)
- Weiß Kreuz Verbrechen & Strafe (1999)
- Hand Maid May (2000)
- A Little Snow Fairy Sugar (2001)
- Cosplay Complex (2002)
- G-On Riders (2002)
- Popotan (2003)
- Maburaho (2003)
- Mahoraba (2005)
- Chibi Vampire (2005)
- Tsuyokiss Cool×Sweet (2006)
- Venus Versus Virus (2007)
- Net Ghost PiPoPa (2008-2009)
- Juden Chan (2009)
- Sleeping with Hinako (2010)
- Junod (2010)
- Bathtime with Hinako & Hiyoko (2010)
- The Magic of Chocolate (2011)
- Ijime (2012)
