= Embassy of Japan, Moscow =

Diplomatic Misson of Japan to Russia

Embassy of Japan in Moscow
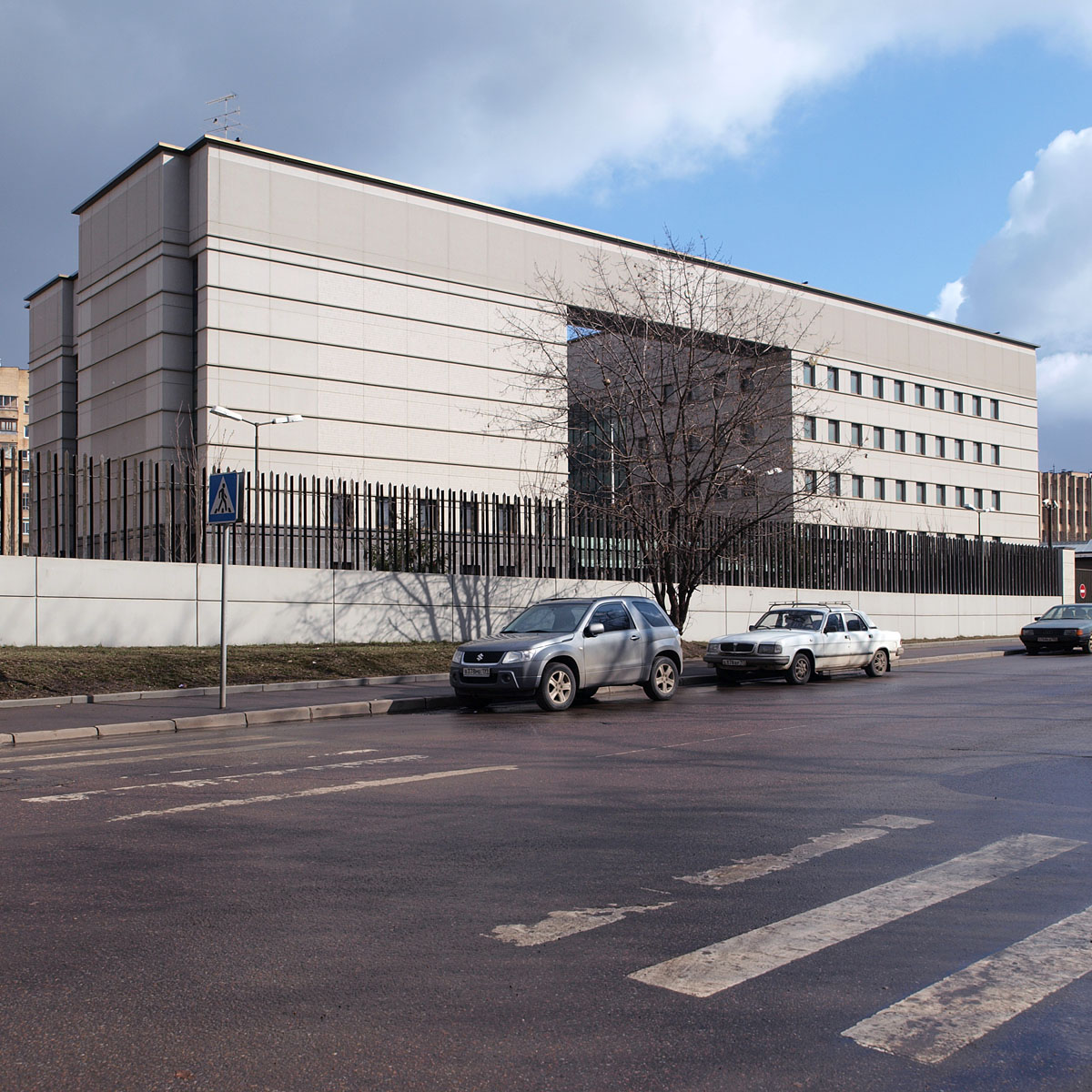
- Location: Basmanny District, Moscow
- Address: Gorokhovsky Pereulok No. 27
- Coordinates: 55.7778°N 37.6417°E
- Ambassador: Akira Muto

The Embassy of Japan in Moscow is the chief diplomatic mission of Japan in the Russian Federation. It is located at 27 Grokholsky Lane (Russian: Грохольский переулок, 27) in the Krasnoselsky District of Moscow.

The Ambassador is Akira Muto.

== See also ==
- Japan–Russia relations
- Diplomatic missions in Russia
