= Tenbatsu! Angel Rabbie =

Japanese original video animation

- Cover art of the DVD.

天罰エンジェルラビィ☆ (Heaven's Judgement! XX Angel Rabbie)
- Genre: Magical girl
- Original video animation
- Directed by: Shinji Ishihira
- Studio: AIC, Media Factory
- Released: 23 January 2004

Tenbatsu! Angel Rabbie (天罰エンジェルラビィ☆; transl. "Heaven's Judgement! XX Angel Rabbie") is a Japanese anime OVA adaptation of an adult visual novel by the same name. (Note: This reference gives the release year as 2003, but 2004 is the correct year.) It was released on January 23, 2004.
