= Funta =

Japanese pop rock band

- Origin: Japan
- Genres: J-pop; anime song; pop rock
- Years active: 1997–present
- Members: UCO; Yoshimi
- Website: funta.net

Funta (ファンタ) is a Japanese pop rock band consisting of two members: UCO (U子, pronounced /yu:ko/) on vocals and Yoshimi (吉見) on guitar and bass. Active since 1997, Funta have not released any full-length albums to date, focusing instead on releasing singles for use as theme songs in anime.

Funta's more recent credits have been primarily for the lyrics and composition of anime themes performed by other artists, including Mika Kikuchi, Suitei-Shojo, and Mai Nakahara. Despite the arguably infrequent nature of band activity, the duo are still active; the Official Funta Website is updated regularly by UCO, who keeps diaries on the site for herself as well as for her three dogs.

== Musical style ==
Funta's decidedly upbeat sound, which they describe (with contested accuracy) as synthpop, incorporates elements of techno, ska, pop punk, and industrial rock, occasionally blending these styles together at a relatively frenetic pace within a single composition ("Wake up Angel"), and other times simply adhering to standard pop music conventions ("Mienai Happy"). With such a limited discography, however, it is perhaps UCO's intentionally cute, occasionally munchkin-esque singing style that is the band's most distinguishing characteristic. With upbeat lyrics, babyish vocals, and perhaps even their very existence as a two-member band, the duo exhibits characteristics relatively common of Japanese musical acts commissioned for work in anime and videogame production.

== Discography ==
=== Soundtrack contributions ===
Most songs listed below are available on the original soundtracks (OSTs) of their respective Series, usually as televised edits (TV SIZE), and only those songs for which "N/A" does not apply as Type. The singles below are cited for containing the full-length versions of all songs listed, and constitute the entirety of Funta's known body of work.

Year	Series	Type	Song	Disc
1998	Dr. Slump	OP#1	"Kao Dekaai"	顔でかーい [Single]
1998	Dr. Slump	N/A	"It's a HAPPY WORLD"	顔でかーい [Single]
1998	Dr. Slump	ED#1	"Hanage ga Chotto Tobidashiteiru."	鼻毛がちょっととびだしている。 [Single]
1998	Dr. Slump	N/A	"ONBORO no Jitensha ni Notte"	鼻毛がちょっととびだしている。 [Single]
2000	Samurai: Hunt for the Sword (OVA)	OP	"I Must Live"	快刀乱麻ー音楽編 - Original Soundtrack
2002	Pita-Ten	OP	"Wake up Angel ~Negaimashite wa ∞ (mugen) Nari~"	Wake up Angel ~ねがいましては∞(無限)なり~ [Maxi]
2002	Pita-Ten	N/A	"We are all Dreamer"	Wake up Angel ~ねがいましては∞(無限)なり~ [Maxi]
2003	Popotan	ED	"S･U･K･I"	ぽぽたん e.p. [Maxi]
2003	Popotan	N/A	"Gem Stone" (with Under17)	ぽぽたん e.p. [Maxi]
2003	Nanaka 6/17	OP	"Sunao na Mama"	「ななか6/17」OPテーマ - 素直なまま [Maxi]
2003	Nanaka 6/17	N/A	"Mienai HAPPY ~Sagashimono wa Itsumo~"	「ななか6/17」OPテーマ - 素直なまま [Maxi]

=== Other credits ===
Year	Series	Type	Song	Performed by	Credit
2003	E's Otherwise	OP	"Jouhou"	Suitei-Shojo	Composition
2005	Capeta	ED#4	"My Star"	Mika Kikuchi	Composition & Lyrics
2006	Kage Kara Mamoru!	OP	"Million Love"	Mai Nakahara	Composition & Lyrics
2006	Kyou no Go no Ni (OVA)	OP	"Baby Love"	Mai Kadowaki, Mamiko Noto, Mikako Takahashi	Composition
2006	Kyou no Go no Ni (OVA)	ED	"Yakusoku"	Mai Kadowaki, Mamiko Noto, Mikako Takahashi	Composition & Lyrics
2006	Yoshinaga-san Chi no Gargoyle	OP	"Ohayou (オハヨウ)"	Chiwa Saito, Nana Mizuki, Yuuna Inamura	Composition & Lyrics

Note: Guitarist Yoshimi is sometimes given composition and/or production credit as Hide.
