= Popotan =

2002 Japanese adult visual novel

- Front cover of the DVD-ROM version of Popotan

ぽぽたん
- Genre: Fantasy comedy, harem
- Novel series
- Written by: Sassami Yachiruda
- Published by: Softgarage
- Original run: June 20, 2002 – August 22, 2002
- Volumes: 2
- Video game
- Developer: JP: Petit Ferret
- Genre: Eroge, visual novel
- Platform: Microsoft Windows
- Released: December 13, 2002 (limited ed.); August 1, 2003 (Popotan Po! DVD-ROM)
- Audio drama
- Station: Osaka Radio, TBS Radio
- Original run: April 2003 – December 2003
- Video game

Popotan Fan Disc: Issho ni A SO BO
- Developer: JP: Petit Ferret
- Genre: Eroge, Visual novel
- Platform: Microsoft Windows
- Released: July 7, 2003
- Anime television series
- Directed by: Shinichiro Kimura
- Produced by: Kozue Kananiwa (Movic); Mitsutoshi Kubota (Shaft); Satoshi Kōno (Bandai); Tetsuo Genshō (TBS)
- Written by: Jukki Hanada
- Music by: Osamu Tezuka
- Studio: Shaft
- Licensed by: NA: Sentai Filmworks
- Original network: BS-i
- Original run: July 18, 2003 – October 3, 2003
- Episodes: 12
- Manga
- Written by: Yūjiro Izumi
- Published by: Kodansha
- Magazine: Magazine Z
- Original run: December 12, 2003 – August 23, 2004
- Volumes: 2
- Video game

Oshiete! Popotan
- Developer: JP: Success
- Publisher: JP: WellMADE
- Genre: Visual novel
- Platform: PlayStation 2
- Released: March 11, 2004

Popotan (Japanese: ぽぽたん) is a Japanese eroge visual novel developed by Petit Ferret with character designs by Akio Watanabe under the alias Poyoyon Rock. It was originally released as a PC game for CD-ROM on December 13, 2002, and subsequently re-released on DVD-ROM and for the PlayStation 2 with certain scenes removed. The title Popotan is a nonsensical word meant to reflect the prominence of dandelions, spelled tanpopo (たんぽぽ) in Japanese; (Note: In the Japanese language, nouns do not have a separate form in the plural.) Petit Ferret also produced a fan disc shortly before the DVD-ROM re-release. Popotan has been adapted to other media, including a novel series (Popotan～ Himitsu no Jumon～ Kōhen) by Sassami Yachiruda; a manga series by Yūjiro Izumi; a twelve episode anime television series directed by Shinichiro Kimura, animated by Shaft, and licensed in North America by Geneon USA and later, Sentai Filmworks; a radio drama (Poporaji); and several art and reference books.

Gameplay in Popotan follows a semi-predetermined plot; major events remain the same, but personal storylines can diverge from the player's choices. The game focuses on protagonist Chris, a drifter who meets three girls, and their maid in a mansion near the ruins of Tokyo in the distant future.

== Gameplay ==
The game uses character position and size to show the characters' relative relation to the protagonist. Ai (left) is closer while Mii (right) is off to the side of the room further away.

Popotan is a visual novel in which players spend most of their time in reading dynamic text, representing either dialogue between the various characters or the inner thoughts of the protagonist. After progressing through text, players either come to a "decision point" where they must choose from multiple options, or the text will end and the player must move to a new location, or, in the DVD-ROM and PS2 versions, use a shortcut option to continue to the next event. Time elapsed between decision points varies. The game pauses at these points and, depending on which choice the player makes, the plot will progress and may branch off in a specific direction. The player must romantically pursue the three sisters, and can seek other characters if one of the sisters' scenarios has been completed.

A special music mini-game commences at certain points in Mii's scenario. The goal of the mini-game is to max out "Magical Girl Mii"'s magical power meter by hitting balls at the right moment. The outcome of the mini-game affects the storyline. Successfully completing her scenarios unlock an omake option on the main menu, allowing the player to play the mini-game with different music tracks. Finishing Ai's scenario unlocks a new story featuring Unagi. The player can save the game only while text is on the screen in the PC versions; this limitation was removed in the PS2 port. The PS2 port also altered the events and scenes based on the DVD version.

== Plot ==
Popotan takes place in the distant future within the remnants of Tokyo, destroyed by a cataclysm and since altered by geological transformations. The disaster was caused by a giant dandelion structure resembling a spire that arose in the city atop a hill. The main location of the game is a European-style mansion, seen as completely out-of-place in the city. Much of the daytime is spent outside the mansion wandering around town meeting characters and triggering event sequences.

The player assumes the role of Chris, the protagonist of Popotan. Chris is a high school dropout who dislikes the direction of society and refuses to get a job. He wanders the streets making a living as a guitar-playing busker. He feels he cannot play well without an audience, which is hard to find as a drifter. The other main characters include three sisters and their maid who live in a western-style mansion. Ai, 18, is the eldest of the three and communicates with plants. Mai is the middle sister at 14; she is a tomboy and disapproves of Chris's behavior. Mii is the youngest at 11 and the most energetic; she often cosplays as "Magical Girl Mii" and helps people. Their maid Mea appears emotionless at first, but reveals hidden depth later in the story.

Popotan follows Chris's lifestyle changes, as well as the mysteries surrounding the spire-like object that caused the destruction of Tokyo in the past. The story opens as Chris desperately considers stealing food from a stand near a shrine entrance. His theft is unsuccessful, and he wanders around town looking for work. He finds a convenience store, where he gets directions leading him to the mansion. He enters without asking permission and runs into the three sisters and their lifelike android maid. Chris asks permission to stay because the rent is cheap and the girls are pretty; they consent, but force him to take a part-time job. The convenience store owner hires him, and as the story progresses, Chris opens up socially and begins caring about others as he interacts with the girls. He also meets new friends, including a classmate Konami, a local shrine maiden named Nono and a mysterious girl named Shizuku.

== Development ==
Petit Ferret developed Popotan in 2002. Seki Hayabusa and Iwashinichi Shimizu handled scenario development, and Akio Watanabe designed its characters while working under the alias Poyoyon♥Rock. Higuchi Hideki and Kajihara Masahiro composed music for the series; Under17 contributed theme music with vocals. Petit Ferret created over 1,000 two-dimensional computer graphics for backgrounds, events, and character poses. Though only characters' mouths and eyes are animated, numerous poses exist for both major and minor characters; Petit Ferret created slightly fewer graphics for the latter to reduce production costs. The game uses a character placement system to display the characters relative to the protagonist; distant characters appear small, and grow larger as the player approaches them.

Petit Ferret requested applications for Japanese voice actresses from May to June 2002, seeking to fill the roles of the three sisters first. Satisfied with the applicants, Petit Ferret held open auditions for other roles starting June 30, 2002. WellMADE produced and distributed the PS2 port, Oshiete! Popotan (おしえて!ぽぽたん), based on the DVD-ROM version of the original game. Petit Ferret made Akio Watanabe project supervisor for the PS2 port.

=== Release information ===
Petit Ferret released a trial version of Popotan for download on November 25, 2002 and released the full PC version on one CD-ROM the following December 13. To increase pre-order sales, Ferret packaged the initial CD-ROM release of Popotan with a special maxi single CD of Under17's theme songs. The firm then released a fan disc on July 11, 2003, titled Popotan Fan Disc: Issho ni A-SO-BO (ぽぽたんファンディスク いっしょにA・SO・BO, Popotan Fan Disc: Let's P-L-A-Y Together). The disc includes several character-based mini-games (including the original's "Magical Girl Mii" mini-game), new storyline content and routes based around Mii and Nono, a separate music CD containing background music from the original game, themed computer wallpaper, and desktop accessories. Some of the items must be unlocked. The fan disc preceded a re-release of the main game as Popotan Po! on August 1, 2003, as a DVD-ROM with game enhancements; it would be Petit Ferret's last official release. WellMADE produced a PS2 port named Oshiete! Popotan, released March 11, 2004. Scenes in the port were changed or removed to comply with Sony's ban on sexual content, but the release still warranted CERO 18 rating. Later, after the CERO revised its rating system, it was given a CERO D rating. WellMADE tried to compensate for their absence with graphics and gameplay improvements. WellMADE enticed buyers of the port with a bonus themed calling card, reversible poster, and music CD. WellMADE also released two free spinoff games in December 2003 and March 2004, collectively named Unagi Fuku Warai (うなぎ福笑い) and featuring Unagi as the heroine. WellMADE designed the games to be humorous and fun; the second allows Unagi to transform into her humanoid form after a certain point in the story.

The initial limited edition release of Popotan on CD-ROM suffered critical errors, such as graphic display issues, saving and loading issues, the inability to complete some routes and Mii's mini-game not starting. Petit Ferret issued a patch on January 10, 2003. Later versions of the game were released bug-free.

Issho ni A-SO-BO also contained several serious errors. Petit Ferret addressed these issues in two patches. The first patch added missing voice data from the original game CD; customers were given the option of downloading the patch or exchanging for a new CD. Ferret released the second patch on July 7, 2003; it corrected grammatical errors, adjusted the game's difficulty, and enhanced stability. The second patch did not contain the first's fixes.

== Related media ==
=== Anime series ===
An anime television series adaptation of Popotan was animated by Shaft and directed by Shinichiro Kimura. A pseudonymous animator going by the name "Haruka Sakurai" (桜井はるか) designed the characters for animation; and Rondo Mizukami served as the chief animation director, with Shaft animator Yoshiaki Itou helping with episodes 6 and 9. Half of the series was animated in-house at Shaft, while the other half was outsourced to a number of other studios: episodes 4 and 10 at studios Animaru Ya and Studio Deen; episodes 5 and 11 at Studio Tama; episode 7 at Satelight; and episode 8 at A.C.G.T. (Note: All outsourcing studios credited as Production Assistance (制作協力) in their respective episode's credits.) Under17 composed the opening theme song in the same style used for the game; Funta wrote the ending theme song. Tokyo Broadcasting System's satellite station BS-i and the Bandai Channel aired the anime from July 18, 2003, through October 3, 2003.

The narrative is episodic and usually focuses on one character at a time. Each of the first four episodes focuses on one of the four main characters, depicting social interaction and growth. The anime's use of time travel allows focus on the older versions or children of previously featured characters, and contrasts their experiences with the protagonists' agelessness. Reviewers have experienced difficulty categorizing the Popotan anime, though it does feature an overall comedic tone. The characters are very lighthearted and eager to help new acquaintances. Nudity appears in many episodes, though no sexually explicit scenes occur. Geneon rated the series for ages 16+; Section23 Films gave its re-release a TV-MA rating.

Shaft released a teaser DVD entitled The Secret of the 3 Sisters (ぽぽたん 送開始記念版 もうガマンできない、３姉妹のひ・み・つ, Popotan Hōsō Kaishi Kinen ban Mō Gaman Deki Nai, 3 Shimai no Hi・Mi・Tsu) on June 27, 2003, featuring character designs by Haruka Sakurai. The DVD also contained video interviews with the anime's Japanese voice actresses, a CD of music from radio the drama, Poporaji (ぽぽらじ)'s theme "Poporaji no Uta" (ぽぽらじの歌), metallic paint illustrations, and a plushie of Unagi. Bandai Visual released the anime on six Japanese DVDs containing two episodes each. Bandai staggered the discs' release over the period September 26, 2003 and February 25, 2004. Each disc came with a promotional figurine of one of the girls; Bandai provided DVDs without the figurines at lower costs. A misprint on the volume 3 DVD jacket occurred during production, numbering the episodes incorrectly. Bandai Visual offered free exchanges of the jackets to purchasers. Geneon USA licensed the DVDs for North American release, producing three DVDs containing four episodes each between December 7, 2004 and April 26, 2005. Geneon USA began selling a box set on August 14, 2007, shortly before the firm's demise. Sentai Filmworks licensed the anime for distribution in late 2009, having made an announcement July 28. Section23 Films re-released the complete series through a 2-disc set on October 27, 2009.

==== Setting and plot ====
An adaptation of the visual novel, the anime takes place in an alternate reality. The main female characters and their relations are unchanged, but the storyline is unrelated to the game's. The plot follows the perspective of the three sisters and their maid rather than the game's protagonist; all the game's major female characters appear and many of the minor characters are used in supporting or cameo roles.

The story centers around the three sisters as they travel through time in a mansion, run a Christmas shop, and search for the dandelion-resembling "popotan". The sisters interact with others and try to improve their situations. The anime suggests that others, including the antagonist Keith, have attempted similar journeys in the past. The anime otherwise covers little backstory, obscuring the reason for why Shizuku, Keith and Mea are associated. The sisters meet Shizuku while traveling through time, who gives them the option to continue journeying or stay in the era they enjoy most; they choose the former. The story ends as they continue traveling through time, leaving unanswered questions concerning their final destination and why they were chosen.

Their bodies are connected to the mansion where they live, which allows them to travel through time. Their bodies cease to age outside the mansion; even their hair stops growing. They jump five years into the future when traveling through time and always arrive in different places, except for a split-party scenario in which Mai and Mea are left behind.

=== Music ===
The visual novel features three themes by Under17—the opening theme 'Say It! Popotan (いっちゃえ！ぽぽたん, Icchae! Popotan), the theme song for Mii's "Magical Girl Mii" cosplay (Mii-tan no Mahō de Pon!! (みいタンの魔法でポン!!)), and ending theme Answer (こたえ, Kotae). Under17 added their theme songs to their Best Album soundtracks along with Popotan Kiss from the radio drama. Under17 plays work composed for Popotan in their live events. Customers who pre-ordered the game received the moe theme songs by Under17 as bonus content. Petit Ferret coincided the visual novel's premiere with the release of a special maxi single containing the anime's vocal theme songs and their instrumental counterparts, otherwise unavailable to listeners. A third Popotan image album based on the visual novel was packaged as a pre-order item with the PS2 port the following year.

The anime opens with Popotan Hatake de Tsukamaete (ぽぽたん畑でつかまえて) by Under17, and the closes with S–U–K–I by Funta. Petit Ferret released two full-length albums and one extended play based on the anime in late 2003. The EP, Popotan e.p. (ぽぽたん e.p.), debuted on August 6, 2003, and featured full versions of the anime's opening and ending themes as well as Gem Stone, an image song collaboration between Under17 and Funta. The first album, It's A PoPoTime!, contains original character songs by the Japanese voice actresses and was released November 6, 2003. The second album, Popo Music, comprised the anime's original soundtrack by Ozamu Tezuka and was released on the 27th. (Note: Ozamu Tezuka is a composer of anime music and should not be confused with Osamu Tezuka, one of the founding Japanese animators.)

=== Radio drama and publications ===
Petit Ferret developed a radio drama named Poporaji, based on a song used in the anime's broadcast premiere DVD, The Secret of the 3 Sisters. The show focused on the three sisters and Mea with their respective Japanese voice actresses playing their roles. It was broadcast by Osaka Broadcasting Corporation in two segments; the first ran from April to September 2003 and the second from October to December 2003. TBS Radio rebroadcast the drama later in its debut week. Petit Ferret announced on January 22, 2004, that Poporaji would be replayed on BEAT NetRadio on Bandai Visual's website and compiled into two CDs, Poporaji Popoi CD (ぽぽらじっぽいCD) and Poporaji Popoi CD2.

Sasami Uachiruda and SPIRITE wrote and illustrated two novels, entitled Popotan～ Himitsu no Jumon～ Kōhen (ぽぽたん ～ひみつのじゅもん～ 後編) and published by Softgarage on June 20 and August 22, 2002. These novels follow the plot of the series, involving all notable characters and combining their personal storylines. Magazine Z published a two-part Popotan manga series by Yūjiro Izumi whose story revolved around the three sisters. The manga was released in two volumes on December 19, 2003 and August 23, 2004.

Two Popotan reference books have been released—Popotan Visual Fan Book (ぽぽたん ビジュアルファンブック, Popotan - Bijuarufanbukku), published by Petit Ferret and SoftBank Publishing, and distributed by Raspberry Books; and Popotan - Official Anthology Manga Book (ぽぽたんオフィシャルビジュアルコミックアンソロジー, Popotan - Ofisharubijuarukomikkuansorojii) by Air Publications. The Popotan Visual Fan Book featured a new side-story printed in western format. (Note: The book is printed to be read from left to right. Traditional Japanese writing is written from right to left.) Kadokawa Shoten published an art book for the series entitled Popotan - Kadokawa Game Collection (ぽぽたん ろっくちゃんのひみつの絵本, Popotan Rock-chan no Himitsu no Ehon). Popotan illustrations also appear in Akio Watanabe - Art Works (ART WORKS (アートワークス), Art Works (Aato Waakusu)). A fan book by ムービック (Muubiki) for the television series was released March 5, 2003, entitled Popotan - Exciting ROM Book (ぽぽたん どきどきROMぶっく, Popotan Dokidoki ROM Bukku) and containing a Microsoft Windows CD-ROM with extra content.

== Legacy, reception and sales ==
=== Visual novel ===
Oshiete! Popotan

Review score
Publication	Score
Famitsu	22 / 40

This dancing scene from the opening of the visual novel is one of the most widely recognized images of Popotan.

Popotan visual novels released by Petit Ferret enjoyed strong initial sales. PCNews' national rating of bishōjo games listed Popotan's initial CD-ROM release at ninth place around one-and-a-half months after its release; it stayed on the charts another half-month at twenty-first. It returned six months after release for a brief stay at forty-sixth shortly before the fan disc was released. The DVD-ROM re-release rose to twenty-fourth in overall sales one month after its debut. The fan disc's release propelled it to eleventh among the most sold bishōjo games within one month. The PS2 port Oshiete! Popotan received a score rating of 22 / 40.

The visual novel featured a dance in its opening that became an Internet phenomenon. The dance features Mai and Mii swinging their hips sideways while holding their hands near the sides of their heads and flapping them, as if making a "goodbye" motion representing cat ears Internet users set the dance to a sped-up chorus of the song Caramelldansen by Caramell. The scene's popularity helped the Popotan franchise and Caramell attain a cult following. The dance is performed by individuals (especially in Japan) at anime conventions, and in advertising, video games and other unrelated anime. The popularity of Popotan in Japan brought Haruko Momoi and her band Under17 to prominence.

=== Anime ===
The first English Popotan DVD met mixed reviews in the United States. Anime Jump gave it 1½ stars, stating that beyond the pretty pictures, "it is created specifically to sell DVDs, tiny figurines, and other merchandise to introverted adult men." DVDtalk gave it a final rating of "recommended" and only criticized the bonus content. The reviewer remarked that the first disc "[...]was full of surprises for even a jaded old reviewer like myself." Anime News Network held mixed attitudes towards the second DVD, citing certain characters and the level of nudity. Its reviewers praised Popotan's storyline, considering it especially complex for a video game-based anime. Popotan has proven notoriously difficult for English reviewers to categorize, leading several to praise its multi-genre style and appeal.

Critics who reviewed only the first DVD gave the series more negative marks than those who reviewed it in full. Of the latter, Allmovie gave Popotan 4/5 stars and DVDtalk awarded it "recommended" status, citing the first two discs. Examining the Sentai Filmworks re-release, Theron Martin concurred that the anime improved towards the end despite rushed plot development. He gave the series low marks overall, feeling its quality varied wildly each episode.

The level of nudity and its importance to the storyline have been widely debated. John Oppliger of Anime Nation feels explicit nudity ruined the Popotan anime, overshadowing its character depth and complex storyline. Anime News Network and Mania agreed that it was excessive; one reviewer from the former likened it to "kiddie porn" and another attributed its re-release to demand for nudity. DVDtalk's reviewers were mixed; one claimed the nude scenes were out-of-place, and another considered them appropriate. Both considered the overall use of nudity to be "minor".

Critics have generally praised the animation and Akio Watanabe's character design. Despite chiding the plot, Mike Toole found the character design "memorable"; reviewer Theron Martin disagreed. Ozamu Tezuka (手塚理, Tezuka Ozamu) found praise for his minimalist approach to the score. Geneon's voice acting also elicited good reception, credited to Rob Beckwell, Popotan's English voice director. Mii is the only protagonist criticized for her voice acting; reviewers particularly praised Mea's voice.

== See also ==
- Caramelldansen
