= List of Rozen Maiden volumes =

The shinsōban edition of Rozen Maiden volume 5 by Shueisha

The first volume of the sequel series of Rozen Maiden

Rozen Maiden is a manga series by Peach-Pit and was serialized in Gentosha's Monthly Comic Birz between issues September 2002 and July 2007. It has been adapted into a radio drama and an anime. The series follows middle school student Jun Sakurada who has withdrawn from society after being persecuted by his classmates. He is then chosen to become the master of the sentient bisque doll Shinku, one of the seven Rozen Maiden set who must compete with her sisters in order to become a perfected doll dubbed as Alice.

Gentosha compiled the individual chapters into eight tankōbon volumes released between March 2003 and June 2007. These volumes were later recompiled into seven shinsōban volumes by Shueisha and released between April 2008 and November 2008. Tokyopop localized Gentosha's tankōbon volumes in English for North America and released them between May 2006 and May 2008. Tokyopop's translations were distributed in Australasia by Madman Entertainment. The series has also been localized in languages such as Chinese, French, and Italian.

In March 2008, Peach-Pit published a one-shot titled Shōjo no Tsukurikata (少女のつくり方, lit. "How to Make a Girl") in the 16th issue of Weekly Young Jump. In the following issue, a serialization for Rozen Maiden was announced. Serialization began in Weekly Young Jump's 20th issue in 2008. The second series was published under the katakana for Rozen Maiden (ローゼンメイデン). The series has been localized in other languages such as Italian, French, and Chinese.

Two spin-off anthology series were created based on the second series. The first spin-off is Rozen Maiden Dolls Talk (ローゼンメイデン Dolls Talk) is created by Haru Karuki. It began serialization in Ribon's January 2012 issue. The second spin-off is Maite wa Ikenai Rozen Maiden (まいてはいけないローゼンメイデン, lit. "The Rozen Maiden that should not have existed") by Choboraunyopomi. It began serialization in Miracle Jump issue 12 released on December 27, 2012. Peach-Pit has also published a one-shot in the October 2013 issue of Ribon which focuses on the Rozen Maiden's past.

A prequel to the original series set in Taishō era Japan called Rozen Maiden 0 -Zero- (ローゼンメイデン0－ゼロー) was published by Peach Pit in Ultra Jump magazine from 2016 to 2019.

== Volume list ==
=== First series ===
==== Tankōbon ====
| No. | Original release date | Original ISBN | English release date | English ISBN |
|---|---|---|---|---|
| 1 | March 24, 2003 | 978-4-34-480212-4 | May 9, 2006 | 978-1598163124 |
Prologue 1 & 2; Phase 1–4
Jun Sakurada is a middle school student who has withdrawn from society after persecutions from his classmates. One day, a Rozen Maiden named Shinku appears in his room as he has been chosen to be her master. Rozen Maidens are a set of seven sentient bisque dolls who were tasked by their creator, Rozen, to battle and take the essence of the other Rozen Maiden's life, called the Rosa Mystica, in order to become a perfect doll dubbed as Alice. The two are able to fend off an attack by Rozen Maiden Suigintou and pursue her into a plane of consciousness known as the N-field. There, Jun relives a memory of his classmate's persucation and meets a mysterious entity known as Laplace's Demon.
| 2 | December 24, 2003 | 978-4-34-480340-4 | September 12, 2006 | 1598163132 |
Phase 5–11
Laplace escorts Jun and Shinku out of the N-field. Elsewhere, the Rozen Maiden Hinaichigo pulls her master, Tomoe Kashiwaba, into the N-field. Realizing Hinaichigo's nativity could endanger Tomoe, Shinku travels to the N-field and battles her; Hinaichigo's overextends her powers, drawing Tomoe's life force in the process, and forces her to relinquish the master-doll contract to save her. In doing so, Hinaichigo forfeits her right to become Alice and becomes Shinku's servant in return for keeping her Rosa Mystica. Later, the Rozen Maiden Suiseiseki requests Shinku's help to free the Rozen Maiden Souseiseki from her master, who abuses her powers for cruelty.
| 3 | September 24, 2004 | 978-4-34-480452-4 | January 9, 2007 | 978-1598163148 |
Phase 12–18
The four travel to the N-field where they meet and battle Suigintou and Souseiseki. Shinku loses her arm in the process and Jun forms a contract with Suiseiseki in order to help them escape. Later, Jun and Suiseiseki return to the N-field to retrieve Shinku's arm and to find Souseiseki. The two wander into the unconscious mind of Souseiseki's master where they find and retrieve Shinku's arm; however, Jun's trauma traps the arm in a cage.
| 4 | December 24, 2004 | 978-4-34-480505-7 | April 10, 2007 | 978-1598163155 |
Phase 19–22; Extra Phase
Jun identifies Souseiseki's master to be Kazuha Yuiibishi, a rich man who owns a local mansion; Kazuha intends to use the Rozen Maidens to make the wife of his deceased twin brother suffer, blaming her for the death. As Suiseiseki and Souseiseki battle within Kazuha's unconscious mind, Kazuha realizes his guilt of having envied his brother before his death is the source of his hatred and asks Souseiseki to destroy that part of him. After doing so, Souseiseki gives Suiseiseki her Rosa Mystica but is instead taken by Suigintou. As Suigintou overwhelms the group, Jun's courage allows him to utilize Rozen's magic to restore Shinku's arm and forces Suigintou to retreat. Afterwards, Jun's Rozen Maidens resolve to return Souseiseki's Rosa Mystica and to end the Alice competition peacefully.
| 5 | August 24, 2005 | 978-4-34-480620-7 | July 10, 2007 | 978-1598168419 |
Phase 23–28
Souseiseki's Rosa Mystica rejects Suigintou causing her to physically suffer. Meanwhile, Suiseiseki adjusts to Souseiseki's death and decides to keep company for Kazuha in her sister's place. Later, Jun's teacher attempts to bring Jun back to school; the teacher's belittlement sends Jun into a deep depression which unconsciously sends him into the N-Field. An amnesiac Souseiseki guides Jun through the N-Field where Jun meets an injured and delirious Suigintou.
| 6 | January 24, 2006 | 978-4-34-480691-7 | October 9, 2007 | 978-1598168891 |
Phase 29–33
Mistaking Jun for Rozen, Suigintou confesses her guilt, sadness, and her longing for Rozen's love. Shinku brings Jun back from the N-Field; elsewhere, the injured Suigintou is found by her master, Megu Kakizaki. The story resumes with daily life, covering Suigintou and Megu's growing bond and the Rozen Maiden Kanaria's introduction. Later, Odile Fosset, the granddaughter of Hinaichigo's former master, asks if Hinaichigo wants to live with her.
| 7 | September 26, 2006 | 978-4-34-480822-5 | January 8, 2008 | 978-1427802217 |
Phase 34–40
The following night, Hinaichigo is teleported to the N-Field by the final Rozen Maiden, Kirakisho; Hinaichigo's body is taken and gives her Rosa Mystica to Shinku. The dolls decide to keep Hinaichigo's death a secret as Jun is making progress to integrate back to society. Kanaria introduces her master, Mitsu Kusabue, to Jun and his Rozen Maidens. Collaborating with Mitsu, Jun designs and sells a doll dress and as a result, gains enough self-confidence to begin studying to return to school. Elsewhere, Suiseiseki discovers Souseiseki's body is missing.
| 8 | June 23, 2007 | 978-4-34-481030-3 | May 1, 2008 | 978-1427811738 |
Phase 41–43
The Rozen Maidens learn that Kirakisho is after their masters in order to use them as an energy source. Inside the N-Field, Kirakisho traps Shinku in a web and uses Souseiseki's body to lure Suiseiseki into a trap. Kirakisho then pulls Megu into the N-Field with Suigintou in pursuit. After Jun learns of the current situation, Laplace's Demon creates a door to the N-Field for Jun to enter.

==== Shinsōban ====
| Volume | Chapters | Release date | ISBN | Ref. |
|---|---|---|---|---|
| Volume 1 | Prologue 1 & 2 Phase 1–4 | April 25, 2008 | 978-4-08-877455-8 | |
| Volume 2 | Phase 5–11 | May 26, 2008 | 978-4-08-877456-5 | |
| Volume 3 | Phase 12–18 | June 26, 2008 | 978-4-08-877457-2 | |
| Volume 4 | Phase 19–23; Extra | July 25, 2008 | 978-4-08-877458-9 | |
| Volume 5 | Phase 24–30 | August 26, 2008 | 978-4-08-877459-6 | |
| Volume 6 | Phase 31–36 | September 26, 2008 | 978-4-08-877460-2 | |
| Volume 7 | Phase 37–43 | November 28, 2008 | 978-4-08-877461-9 | |

=== Second series ===
| No. | Japan release date | Japan ISBN |
|---|---|---|
| 1 | December 19, 2008 | 978-4-08-877566-1 |
lit. "How to Make a Girl" (少女のつくり方, Shoujo no Tsukurikata); Tale 1–5
The story follows a university student Jun from a world where Rozen Maidens don't exist. Jun is given parts by the younger Jun from the previous years to build a replacement body for Shinku. After doing so, Shinku is able to transfer her Rosa Mystica to the new body. Jun receives new parts for another doll but is advised against building it as it may be Kirakisho's trap. Suigintou ends up in the same world through Jun's bathroom mirror. While the two dolls wait for the world to connect to the N-Field, Jun befriends his co-worker and joins an arts club. Feeling depressed about his life, Jun is persuaded by a text message, posing as the young Jun, into building the doll he received.
| 2 | September 18, 2009 | 978-4-08-877702-3 |
Tale 6–12
Jun continues his daily life with the arts club, work, and building Kirakisho's doll. The theatrics club enact out their play; during the play, the world connects to the N-Field and Kirakisho materializes through the doll Jun built. Shinku and Suigintou battle Kirakisho and are interrupted by Suiseiseki.
| 3 | February 19, 2010 | 978-4-08-877811-2 |
Tale 13–19
Suiseiseki reveals Kirakisho is currently possessing Souseiseki's body and has Jun form a contract with Souseiseki's ring. Kirakisho's possession weakens allowing Suiseiseki to revive Souseiseki with her Rosa Mystica. A portal to the N-Field opens up where the two Juns meet in person. While the young Jun searches for Shinku's real body, the adult Jun and Kanaria rendezvous with their allies. They come upon a grandfather clock, which was used during the play, and realize it was the gate which pulled them into the N-Field.
| 4 | September 17, 2010 | 978-4-08-879029-9 |
Tale 20–25
In order to escape the N-Field, Suigintou agrees to lend a Rosa Mystica to Souseiseki since Souseiseki and Suiseiseki are needed to control the grandfather clock. After opening paths to their worlds, Shinku's replacement body disintegrates; The young Jun returns with Shinku's real body and revives her. Jun, young Jun, and the Rozen Maidens then return to their respective worlds. In the adult Jun's world, a time anomaly causes Jun to obtain a bisque doll which replaced Shinku's position in that world.
| 5 | May 27, 2011 | 978-4-08-879119-7; ISBN 978-4-08-782375-2 (Special edition) |
Tale 26–31
The story now follows young Jun. Jun and the Rozen Maidens return to their daily life while elsewhere, Megu wakes from her coma. Jun meets Kaito Toriumi, a junior from his school, who is investigating about Rozen Maidens.
| 6 | November 18, 2011 | 978-4-08-879214-9 |
Tale 32–37; Extra Tale
Jun returns to school while the Rozen Maidens search the N-Field for Kirakisho. While Jun struggles to contain his panic, he meets Megu who tells him the two of them don't belong in society. Jun finds Megu's shoes and is mislabeled as a pervert until Megu covers for him. He later goes up to the roof to thank her but falls and injures his ankle. Megu then asked by Kirakisho to oppress him.
| 7 | May 18, 2012 | 978-4-08-879214-9 |
Tale 38–43
Kirakisho has taken Jun's consciousness into the N-Field and has left his body comatose. Tomoe questions Megu about Jun's condition and is taken into the N-Field by Kirakisho. The Rozen Maidens save Tomoe but Mitsu is captured in her place. Without Jun as a power source, the Rozen Maidens decide to call adult Jun for help. Meanwhile, Suigintou and Kanaria battle dolls created by Kaito. The Rozen Maidens contact Jun who is then pulled into the N-Field by the time anomaly doll.
| 8 | December 19, 2012 | 978-4-08-879575-1 |
Tale 44–49
The time anomaly doll is revealed to be an analogue of Kirakisho. The doll leads the group into Kirakisho's castle. There, Jun and Tomoe wander into young Jun's consciousness and are able to free him from Kirakisho's control. Meanwhile, Shinku, Suiseiseki, and Kanaria battle Kaito's dolls; Suiseiseki stays behind afterwards, having exhausted her energy.
| 9 | July 19, 2013 | 978-4-08-879563-8 |
Tale 50–56
Shinku and Kanaria battle another one of Kaito's dolls which exhausts Kanaria's energy and puts her in a deep sleep. Meanwhile, both Juns find Mitsu and are able to reunite with Shinku and Kanaria. The group enters Kirakisho's castle where they find Suigintou.
| 10 | April 18, 2014 | 978-4-08-879777-9 |
Tale 57–65; Final Tale

=== Dolls Talk ===
| No. | Japan release date | Japan ISBN |
|---|---|---|
| 1 | December 19, 2012 | 978-4-08-867243-4 |
| 2 | August 9, 2013 | 978-4-08-867283-0 |
| 3 | October 10, 2014 | 978-4-08-867331-8 |

=== Zero ===
| No. | Japan release date | Japan ISBN |
|---|---|---|
| 1 | November 18, 2016 | 978-4-08-890515-0 |
| 2 | September 19, 2017 | 978-4-08-890748-2 |
| 3 | October 19, 2018 | 978-4-08-891119-9 |
| 4 | June 19, 2019 | 978-4-08-891286-8 |
