= Hinamori =

Hinamori may refer to:

- Momo Hinamori, a fictional character from the manga series Bleach by Tite Kubo
- Amu Hinamori, a fictional character from the manga series Shugo Chara! by Peach-Pit
- Hinamori (official)
