= Kukui (band) =

Japanese band

Kukui is a Japanese band consisting of Haruka Shimotsuki (vocal, lyrics & composition) and Myu (composition, arrangement & lyrics). They have produced songs for anime and games, most notably the Rozen Maiden anime series.

== History ==
Originally, Shimotsuki and Myu of Refio (formerly a band made up of Myu and Riya) collaborated under the name Refio + Haruka Shimotsuki when they performed "Toumei Shelter", ending theme for Rozen Maiden in 2004. Not long after they formed Kukui and produced a dojin single "Yumewatari no Yoru", which was sold at the 67th Comic Market the same year. The following year they returned to provide the ending theme for Rozen Maiden's second season, Träumend, and made their first major release as Kukui with the mini album Hikari no Rasenritsu. In 2007 they released the album Leer Lied. Though technically their first full album, it was labelled as a Rozen Maiden Best Album, and included "Utsusemi no Kage", ending theme for the series' TV special Ouvertüre. The next album they released Hakoniwa Note, was marketed as their first album. It included their songs for the game Angel Profile.

Shimotsuki and Myu have collaborated on a number of occasions outside of kukui. They did the ending theme for the game Girlish Grimoire Little Witch Romanesque (2005), a song on tieLeaf's (a doujin circle Shimotsuki belongs) album Tsukioi no Toshi (2005), and two songs on a doujin album by Whitepaper (2007).

== Discography ==
=== Singles ===
- 透明シェルター / Toumei Shelter (released on November 25, 2004, as refio + Haruka Shimotsuki) — anime television series Rozen Maiden ending theme
- ゆめわたりの夜 / Yumewatari no Yoru (independent release, released on 29 December 2004)
  1. ゆめわたりの夜 / Yumewatari no Yoru
  2. 雨の後に / Ame no Ato ni
  3. ゆめわたりの夜 / Yumewatari no Yoru (off vocal)
  4. 雨の後に / Ame no Ato ni (off vocal)
- Little Primrose (released on January 25, 2006)
  1. Little Primrose — anime television series Kagihime Monogatari Eikyū Alice Rondo opening theme
  2. アマヤドリ / Amayadori
  3. Little Primrose (off vocal)
  4. アマヤドリ / Amayadori (off vocal)
- Starry Waltz (released on April 26, 2006)
  1. Starry Waltz — anime television series Nishi no Yoki Majo Astraea Testament opening theme
  2. 闇の輪廻 / Yami no Rinne
  3. Starry Waltz <off vocal>
  4. 闇の輪廻 / Yami no Rinne <off vocal>
- コンコルディア / Concordia (released on May 23, 2007)
  1. コンコルディア / Concordia — anime television series Shinkyoku Sōkai Polyphonica ending theme
  2. 二重奏 / Nijuusou
  3. コンコルディア / Concordia Instrumental
  4. 二重奏 / Nijuusou Instrumental
- 地図散歩 / Chizu Sanpo (released on February 18, 2009)
  1. 地図散歩 / Chizu Sanpo — anime television series Maria-sama ga Miteru 4th season opening theme
  2. 優しい距離 / Yasashii Kyori
  3. 地図散歩 / Chizu Sanpo (off vocal)
  4. 優しい距離 / Yasashii Kyori (off vocal)
- 瞬間シンパシー / Shunkan Sympathy (released on August 25, 2010)

=== Albums ===
- 光の螺旋律 / Hikari no Rasenritsu (mini album, released on November 23, 2005) — anime television series Rozen Maiden träumend ending theme
- Rozen Maiden Best Album: Leer Lied (released on April 25, 2007)
- 箱庭ノート / Hakoniwa Note (released on October 24, 2007)
1. Approach
2. 箱庭ノート / Hakoniwa Note
3. コンコルディア / Concordia
4. Starry Waltz
5. cycle
6. 夜の奥底 / Yoru no Okusoko
7. 透明シェルター ~kukui ver.~ / Toumei Shelter ~kukui ver.~
8. 虹色クオーツ / Nijiiro Quartz — PS2 game Angel Profile opening theme
9. 空のメロディ / Sora no Melody — PS2 game Angel Profile ending theme
10. 記憶 / Kioku
11. アマヤドリ / Amayadori
12. 二重奏 / Nijuusou
13. Little Primrose

=== Other ===
- 希望の羽 (Kibou no Hane) — kukui presents (from Haruka Shimotsuki's Ashiato Rhythm album, released on September 22, 2005)
- 流れ星ひとつ (Nagareboshi Hitotsu) — (from sola Image Song Album: oratorio, released on August 8, 2007)
- Thankful Anniversary — (from Rozen Maiden träumend Original Drama CD Vol.2, released on December 21, 2007)
- 空回りのエアメール (Karamawari no Airmail) — (from Tears...for truth: true tears Image Song Collection, released April 16, 2008)
- (from Tales of the Abyss Image Song Album: brilliant world, released January 7, 2009)
  - Flourish
  - 大いなる営み (Ooinaru Itonami)
  - 永久の雪と咎 (Towa no Yuki to Toga)
  - 未来の果て (Mirai no Hate)
  - Passage
- コンペイトウ (Konpeitou) — (from Bungaku Shōjo to Yumeutsutsu no Melody, released on August 14, 2009)
- 虚無の華 (Kyomu no Hana) — anime television series Katanagatari 4th ending theme (2010)
