= Rika Morinaga =

Japanese voice actress and singer (born 1980)

- 森永 理科
- Born: April 25, 1980 (age 46); Tokyo, Japan
- Occupations: Voice actress; singer
- Years active: 2002–present
- Agent: Mausu Promotion
- Notable credit: Souseiseki in Rozen Maiden

Rika Morinaga (森永 理科, Morinaga Rika; born April 25, 1980 in Tokyo) is a Japanese voice actress and singer represented by Mausu Promotion. She is best known for her role as Souseiseki in Rozen Maiden, Makoto "Mako-chan" in Minami-ke, and Rita Mordio in Tales of Vesperia. Morinaga is also the lead singer of the goth rock band function code();.

== Filmography ==
=== Anime ===
2003

- Saint Beast ~Seijuu Kourin Hen~ - Pinky
- Wandaba Style - Sakura Haruno

2004

- Rozen Maiden - Souseiseki

2005

- Kamichu! - Matsuri Saegusa
- Keroro Gunsou - Moguko
- Transformers: Galaxy Force - Lori
- Blood+ - Nahabi
- Rozen Maiden ~Träumend~ - Souseiseki

2006

- Inukami! - Tayune
- Kiba - Mirette
- Jigoku Shoujo Futakomori - Yumie Hanamura (Episode 3)
- Simoun - Mamina
- Chocotto Sister - Makoto Ashirai
- Night Head Genesis - Naji
- Crash B-Daman - Aoi Saionji
- Black Lagoon - Kageyama (Second daughter)
- The Wallflower - Female Student
- Rozen Maiden Ouvertüre - Souseiseki

2007

- Princess Resurrection - Francisca
- Gakuen Utopia Manabi Straight! - Former Student Council President
- Kaze no Stigma - Ren Kannagi
- Claymore - Claudia, Diana
- Skull Man - Child
- My Bride Is a Mermaid - Mawari Zenigata
- Tōka Gettan Kōhi, Nero
- Minami-ke - Makoto "Mako-chan"
- Moetan - Ruriko
- Romeo x Juliet - Elder Sister, Girl
- Inukami! The Movie: Tokumei Reiteki Sōsakan Karina Shirō! - Tayune
- Hiyoko no Samurai: Hiyo Zaemon - Zaemon Hiyo

2008

- Kyōran Kazoku Nikki - Grim Reaper III
- Clannad After Story - Child
- Minami-ke: Okawari - Makoto "Mako-chan"

2009

- Saki - Ikeda Kana
- Tales of Vesperia: The First Strike - Rita Mordio
- Minami-ke: Okaeri - Makoto "Mako-chan"

2010

- Strike Witches 2 - Fernandia Malvezzi

2011

- Horizon in the Middle of Nowhere - Brown Algae

2012

- Horizon in the Middle of Nowhere 2 - Brown Algae
- Saki Achiga-hen episode of Side-A - Ikeda Kana

2013

- Rozen Maiden: Zurückspulen - Souseiseki

=== Video games ===
- Ar tonelico II Sekai ni Hibiku Shōjo-tachi no Metafalica - Frelia
- Otome no Jijou - Mami Tachibana
- Gadget Trial - Yu-ri
- Summon Night: Twin Age - Ugunia
- Simoun: Rose War ~Ri Mājon of Sealing~ - Mamiina
- D→A: White - Kuu
- Tales of the World: Radiant Mythology 3 - Rita Mordio
- Tales of Vesperia - Rita Mordio
- Tales of VS - Rita Mordio
- Torikago no Mukougawa - Doruche
- Fragments Blue - Natsuon Igarashi
- Blue Flow - Rachael Jealous, Tamao Igarashi, Margaret Sherman
- Blue Blaster - Iris Lafayette
- Marriage Royale ~Prism Story~ - Sanjoh Asahi
- Monochrome - Hinamizu
- Lucky Star: Ryōō Gakuen Ōtōsai - Kou Yasaka
- Remember 11: The Age of Infinity - Cocoro Fuyukawa
- Onihimeden ~Ayakashi Hanashi~ - Tsukiyo Amamiya

== Discography ==
=== CD ===
- Gesshoku Kageki Dan: Neverland Navigation Record

=== Character CD ===
- My Bride Is a Mermaid Character Single 3 『GAP』 - Mawari Zenigata
- Minami-ke Biyori - Makoto

=== Drama CD ===
- Supa Supa - Chihaya Yuuki
- Ekoto Isshou - Taeko Ebisawa
- Kaze no Stigma - Ren Kannagi
- Kamiyomi - Emperor Antoku
- Zero In - Sakura Sonobe
- Rozen Maiden Original Drama ~Tantei - Detektiv~ - Souseiseki
- Rozen Maiden Träumend Character Drama Vol.4 - Souseiseki

=== Radio CD ===
- Suigintou no Koyoi mo Ennu~i Vol.2 - Souseiseki
