= Wandaba Style =

Japanese anime television series

- Wandaba Style ADV DVD cover art

妄想科学シリーズ ワンダバスタイル (Mōsō Kagaku Shirīzu Wandaba Sutairu)
- Genre: Adventure, comedy, science fiction
- Anime television series
- Directed by: Yoshihiro Takamoto
- Written by: Juzo Mutsuki
- Music by: Try Force
- Studio: TNK
- Licensed by: NA: Section23 Films
- Original network: TV Saitama, Chiba TV, Sun TV, TV Kanagawa, Mie TV, Kids Station
- Original run: April 5, 2003 – June 21, 2003
- Episodes: 12
- icon

Wacky Science Fiction Series Wandaba Style (妄想科学シリーズ ワンダバスタイル, Mōsō Kagaku Shirīzu Wandaba Sutairu), shortened to Wandaba Style in the English language release, is a Japanese anime television series animated by TNK. It originally aired from April 5, 2003, to June 21, 2003. The series was released in English by ADV Films and 3 volumes of videos were released on VHS and DVD.

== Plot ==
The story is about a pop idol band named Mix Juice that need any kind of gig to make their name famous. At the same time, a young boy genius plans on taking a trip to the Moon without using fossil fuels to pollute Earth's atmosphere. Thanks to some clever managing, the girls of Mix Juice and the scientist plan on making their first concert on the Moon by any means necessary.

== Main characters ==
All the female leads are named after flowers in the Japanese language. Sakura means 'cherry blossom', Himawari means 'sunflower', Ayame means 'iris', Yuri means 'lily', and Kiku means 'chrysanthemum'.

The Mix Juice girls also have seasons within their last names that also correspond with their first names. Haru means 'spring', Natsu means 'summer', Aki means 'autumn' and Fuyu means 'winter'.

- Sakura Haruno (春野 桜 Haruno Sakura) - Sakura is a nursery music singer who is spoiled by her success. She is the smart-aleck kid of Mix Juice who usually gets in trouble due to her mouthing off. Like most children her apparent age, Sakura has a severe and intense fear of the dark. It is stated in the first episode that Sakura is actually the oldest member of the group. Sakura has blond hair in pigtails and hazel eyes. She weighs 48 kg and is 155 cm tall. She shares the name of kunoichi Sakura Haruno from the Naruto series. Her measurements are 75-58-71. Voiced by: Rika Morinaga (Japanese); Luci Christian (English)
- Himawari Natsuwa (夏輪 向日葵 Natsuwa Himawari) - Himawari is an enka balladeer and speaks in traditional Japanese fashion as well as modern Japanese. She works part-time at a construction site where she is the focus of a lot of construction workers. Himawari has black hair in a ponytail and brown eyes. She weighs 48 kg and is 158 cm tall. Her measurements are 81-58-77. Voiced by: Mai Nakahara (Japanese); Monica Rial (English)
- Ayame Akimo (秋茂 菖蒲 Akimo Ayame) - Ayame is the soft-spoken member of Mix Juice and also the most eccentric. She claims that there are fairies in the world and that only she can see them. Ayame is a modern folk singer reminiscent of the Woodstock era. Ayame has blue hair and blue eyes. She weighs 46 kg and is 160 cm tall. Her measurements are 78-57-76. She wears glasses as well. Voiced by: Chiwa Saito (Japanese); Nancy Novotny (English)
- Yuri Fuyude (冬出 百合 Fuyude Yuri) - Yuri is a rocker rebel singer who swings to the beat of her own drum. She constantly gets fired from her jobs due to her stubborn pride as a musician trying to go against new idol singers performing at places she works in. Although Yuri acts tough, she has severe acrophobia, or fear of heights. Yuri has long brown hair and blue eyes. She weighs 52 kg and is 163 cm tall. Her measurements are 88-56-84. Voiced by: Kana Ueda (Japanese); Kira Vincent-Davis (English)
- Dr. Susumu Tsukumo (九十九 科学 Tsukumo Susumu) - Dr. Tsukumo is a young brown haired boy who wears a lab coat with the number 99 on the back. His theory was that man never landed on the Moon and plans on doing it without using fossil fuels for a rocket. Dr. Tsukumo creates custom rockets called "Wandaba Mark #" for experimentation. Whenever Tsukumo measures something, he uses the old Japanese metric system consisting of units of measurement like the shaku, the sun, the ri and the koku. Voiced by: Kōki Miyata (Japanese); Tiffany Grant (English)
- Kiku No. 8 (キク8号 Kiku Hachi-gō) - Kiku No. 8 is Dr. Tsukumo's android lab assistant and a human satellite. Kiku's body is constructed of a solar-powered metal that recharges her. Sakura faults Tsukumo for this design accusing him of being a pervert. Kiku has short pink hair and a faceless expression. During the end of some episodes of Wandaba Style, she introduces "Kiku's Countdown Corner" to count how many days before the deadline of reaching the Moon. Voiced by: Ai Shimizu (Japanese); Hilary Haag (English)
- Michael Hanagata (マイケル花形 Maikeru Hanagata) - Mix Juice's shady and sleazy manager, Michael is a skinny man with a blonde afro, big sunglasses and an even bigger mouth. He dreamed of managing the best band in the world that would make him millions. Michael often finds himself launched into orbit by some of Tsukumo's experiments. Every time he says his name, he gets interrupted. Voiced by: Susumu Chiba (Japanese); Jason Douglas (English)
- Ichirin - Dr. Tsukumo's robot unicycle and lab assistant that looks after him like a big brother. Tsukumo was an only child. Ichirin helps out with Tsukumo's experiments and to keep track of the progress. Ichirin's voice is more cultured like a butler's. Voiced by: Ken Narita (Japanese); Jay Hickman (English)
- Tsukumo's parents - Dr. Tsukumo's parents are both scientists named Kōsaku and Furuko. Kōsaku was experimenting with an earlier rocket to try to reach the Moon and was never heard from again. It turns out in Tsukumo fashion, it fell back to Earth and was living in Canada at the time. Furuko is a vicious, wicked and selfish mother to the doctor during his youth and has become his mortal enemy. Near the end of Wandaba Style, Fukuro finally reconciled with her son and put this long-standing rivalry to rest. She joined Kōsaku in the limousine and Dr. Tsukumo resumed his experiments. Furoku Tsukomo is voiced by Akemi Okamura in Japanese and Christine Auten in English. Kōsaku Tsukomo is voiced by Shigeru Nakahara in Japanese and Andy McAvin in English.

== List of episodes ==
No.	Title	Original release date
1	"Begin Project" "Purojekkuto Shidō" (プロジェクト始動)	April 5, 2003
2	"Let's Drink to H2C03!" "H2C03 ni Kanpai!" (H2CO3にカンパイ！)	April 12, 2003
3	"Let's Sing in the Stratosphere!" "Seisōken de Utaou!" (成層圏で歌おう！)	April 19, 2003
4	"The Horror of 1600 Kilometers an Hour!" "Jisoku 1600km no Kyōfu" (時速1600Kmの恐怖)	April 26, 2003
5	"It's the Power of Magnetism! It's a Linear Gun!" "Jiryoku no Chikarada! Riniagan da!" (磁力の力だ！ リニアガンだ！)	May 3, 2003
6	"Warp from a Slump?!" "Suranpu kara no Wāpu!?" (スランプからのワープ!?)	May 10, 2003
7	"It's Show Time!" "Ittsu・Shō・Taimu" (いっつ・しょー・たいむ)	May 17, 2003
8	"Fly Me to the Moon" (FLY ME TO THE MOON)	May 24, 2003
9	"Live or Life?!" (LIVE or LIFE!?)	May 31, 2003
10	"Coming Back Alive" "Seikan" (生還)	June 7, 2003
11	"Sachiko, Who Came From a Distant Planet" "Tōi Hoshi kara Kita Sachiko" (遠い星から来たサチコ)	June 14, 2003
12	"Fantasies Surpass Science" "Mōsō wa Kagaku o Koete" (妄想は科学を超えて)	June 21, 2003

== Opening and ending themes ==
"The Ijin-den Tensai no Housoku" ("The Legend of a Great Man, the Law of a Genius") and "Moon de Go! Go!", both with lyrics written by Juzo Mutsuki, composed by Hiroshi Kamayatsu, and arranged by Yogo Kawano, and both were sung by Mix Juice (Mai Nakahara, Kana Ueda, Chiwa Saito, Rika Morinaga).
