= Music of Rozen Maiden =

Rozen Maiden discography
- Soundtrack albums: 5
- Compilation albums: 3
- Singles: 7
- Radio dramas: 19

Rozen Maiden is a manga series by Peach-Pit. It has been adapted into four anime series by Tokyo Broadcasting System. The anime series had its music produced by Mellow Head with soundtrack composed by Shinkichi Mitsumune. In Mellow Head was renamed to On The Run and in later was merged into Lantis. The anime has also produced several theme music and had their anime voice cast used to produce radio dramas. The soundtrack, theme music, and radio dramas were released by Mellow Head, On The Run, and Lantis. Prior to the anime's creation, a radio drama titled Drama CD Rozen Maiden was produced and released by Frontier Works with their own voice cast.

Two radio programs were created by Tokyo Broadcasting System. Rozen Maiden Web Radio: Rose Scented Garden Party (ローゼンメイデン・ウェブラジオ 薔薇の香りのGarden Party, Rōzen Meiden Uebu Rajio Bara no Kaori no Garden Pātī) is an internet radio program that aired on Lantis Web Radio between May 13, 2005, and September 30, 2005. It was hosted by Miyuki Sawashiro and Asami Sanada, the voice of Shinku and Jun respectively. Suigintou's Night of Ennui (水銀燈の今宵もアンニュ～イ, Suigintou no Koyoi mo Annyu~i) was a live radio hosted by Sugintou's voice actress Rie Tanaka during Tokyo Broadcasting System's Anime Festa 2006. Due to positive reception, it was continued through additional CD releases.

== Compilation albums ==
| Year | Title | Charts | | Ref. |
| Year | Title | Peak | Weeks | Ref. |
|---|---|---|---|---|
| 2005 | Leer Lied "Rozen Maiden Best Album": Released: April 25, 2007; Label: Lantis LHCA-5072; Contains Kukui's music for Rozen Maiden and some original soundtrack; No. / Title / Length; 1. / "Utsusemi no Kage" (空蝉ノ影, Utsusemi's Shadow) / 4:22; 2. / "Kanata kara no Requiem" (彼方からの鎮魂歌, Requiem From Afar) / 5:05; 3. / "Pizzicato Hiyori" (ピチカート日和, A Fine Pizzicato Day) / 3:38; 4. / "Midori no Yubi" (みどりのゆび, Green Fingers) / 5:14; 5. / "Hachimitsu" (はちみつ, Honey) / 4:06; 6. / "Toumei Shelter" (透明シェルター, Transparent Shelter) / 4:05; 7. / "Chikakute Tooi Yume" (近くて遠いゆめ, The Near Yet Far Dream) / 4:26; 8. / "Monokuro Sekai" (モノクロセカイ, Monochrome World) / 3:29; 9. / "Utsutsu Yume" (現夢, Present Dream) / 4:06; 10. / "Leer Lied" / 0:42; 11. / "Eden" / 4:00; 12. / "Hikari no Rasenritsu" (光の螺旋律, Spiraling Melody Of Light) / 3:51 | 62 | 2 | |
| 2009 | Rozen Maiden Piano Sound Album: Released: January 9, 2009; Label: Lantis LHCA-5094; Contains piano arrangement versions of the series' theme songs and soundtrack | — | | |
| 2009 | Rozen Maiden Strings Sound Album: Released: February 25, 2009; Label: Lantis LHCA-5099; Contains strings instruments arrangement versions of the series' theme songs and soundtrack | — | | |
"—" denotes releases that did not chart.

== Singles ==
| Year | Title | Artist | Charts | | Ref. |
| Year | Title | Artist | Peak | Weeks | Ref. |
|---|---|---|---|---|---|
| 2004 | lit. "Forbidden Play" (禁じられた遊び, Kinjirareta Asobi): Released: October 22, 2004; Label: On The Run LHCM-1001; It was used as the opening theme for Rozen Maiden; No. / Title / Length; 1. / "Kinjirareta Asobi" (禁じられた遊び, Forbidden Game) / 4:27; 2. / "Atashi ga Alice datta koro" (あたしがアリスだった頃, When I Was Alice) / 4:14; 3. / "Kinjirareta Asobi (off vocal)" (禁じられた遊び (off vocal)) / 4:27; 4. / "Atashi ga Alice datta koro (off vocal)" (あたしがアリスだった頃 (off vocal)) / 4:11 | Ali Project | 40 | 25 | |
| 2004 | lit. "Transparent Shelter" (透明シェルター, Toumei Shelter): Released: November 25, 2004; Label: On The Run LHCM-1003; It was used as the ending theme for Rozen Maiden; No. / Title / Length; 1. / "Toumei Shelter" (透明シェルター, Transparent Shelter) / 4:05; 2. / "Hachimitsu" (はちみつ, Honey) / 4:06; 3. / "Monokuro Sekai" (モノクロセカイ, Monochrome World) / 3:30; 4. / "Toumei Shelter (off vocal)" (透明シェルター (off vocal)) / 4:05 | Refio; Haruka Shimotsuki | 76 | 3 | |
| 2005 | lit. "Saintly-Girl Domain" (聖少女領域, Seishōjo Ryouiki): Released: October 26, 2005; Label: On The Run LHCM-1014; It was used as the opening theme for Rozen Maiden Träumend; No. / Title / Length; 1. / "Seishōjo Ryouiki" (聖少女領域, Saintly-Girl Domain) / 4:37; 2. / "S-jou no Himeyaka na Kaikon" (S嬢の秘めやかな悔恨, A Sadistic Girl's Secret Regrets) / 4:25; 3. / "Seishōjo Ryouiki (off vocal)" (聖少女領域 (off vocal)) / 4:37; 4. / "S-jou no Himeyaka na Kaikon (off vocal)" (S嬢の秘めやかな悔恨 (off vocal)) / 4:26 | Ali Project | 6 | 22 | |
| 2005 | lit. "Spiraling Melody of Light" (光の螺旋律, Hikari no Rasenritsu): Released: November 23, 2005; Label: On The Run LHCM-1024; It was used as the ending theme for Rozen Maiden Träumend; No. / Title / Length; 1. / "Hikari no Rasenritsu" (光の螺旋律, Spiraling Melody Of Light) / 3:49; 2. / "Utsutsu no Yume" (現夢, Present Dream) / 4:07; 3. / "Atem" / 2:18; 4. / "Arcana" (アルカナ) / 0:52; 5. / "Shiro to Aka" (白と赤, White and Red) / 1:28; 6. / "Kamp" / 2:13; 7. / "Hikari no Rasenritsu (off vocal)" (光の螺旋律 (off vocal)) / 3:49 | Kukui | 81 | 3 | |
| 2006 | lit. "Rose Prison Maiden" (薔薇獄乙女, Bara Goku Otome): Released: December 6, 2006; Label: On The Run LHCM-1025; It was used as the opening theme for Rozen Maiden Ouvertüre; No. / Title / Length; 1. / "Bara Goku Otome" (薔薇獄乙女, Rose Prison Maiden) / 4:42; 2. / "Gokuraku Ibarahime" (極楽荊姫) / 4:21; 3. / "Bara Goku Otome (instrumental)"" (薔薇獄乙女 ~instrumental~) / 4:42; 4. / "Gokuraku Ibarahime (instrumental)" (極楽荊姫 ~instrumental~) / 4:21 | Ali Project | 11 | 14 | |
| 2013 | lit. "Eat My Roses" (私の薔薇を喰みなさい, Watashi no Bara o Haminasai): Released: July 24, 2013; Label: Lantis LACM-14108, LACM-34108 (Limited Edition); It was used as the opening theme for Rozen Maiden Zurückspulen | Ali Project | 20 | 7 | |
| 2013 | Alternative: Released: August 7, 2013; Label: Lantis LACM-14126, LACM-34126 (Limited Edition); It was used as the ending theme for Rozen Maiden Zurückspulen | Annabel | 69 | 2 | |
"—" denotes releases that did not chart.

== Soundtracks ==
| Year | Title | Charts | | Ref. |
| Year | Title | Peak | Weeks | Ref. |
|---|---|---|---|---|
| 2005 | TV Anime Rozen Maiden Original Soundtrack (Note: TVアニメ『ローゼンメイデン』オリジナルサウンドトラック, TV Anime Rōzen Meiden Orijinaru Saundotorakku): Released: January 26, 2005; Label: On The Run LHCA-5003; The soundtrack for the anime Rozen Maiden; No. / Title / Length; 1. / "Kinjirareta Asobi <TV size>" (禁じられた遊び <TV size>, Forbidden Game <TV size>) / 1:34; 2. / "Battle of Rose" / 2:22; 3. / "Komatta Shumi" (困った趣味, Worrying Hobby) / 1:31; 4. / "Atatakana Kokoro" (暖かな心, Warm Heart) / 2:14; 5. / "Ivy" / 0:08; 6. / "Reminiscence" / 1:48; 7. / "Kurayami yori Kuru mono" (暗闇より来るもの, Those Who Came from the Darkness) / 1:33; 8. / "Noble Dolls" / 1:53; 9. / "Kanshaku" (癇癪, Passion) / 1:17; 10. / "Cute Girl" / 1:00; 11. / "Hageshii Omoi" (激しい思い, Feelings of Fury) / 1:12; 12. / "Junan no Hibi" (受難の日々, Days of Agony) / 1:27; 13. / "Battle in the House" / 1:32; 14. / "Naisei" (内省, Reflecting) / 2:23; 15. / "Awai Omoide" (淡い想い出, Faint Memories) / 2:11; 16. / "Kodoku na Kokoro" (孤独な心, Lonely Heart) / 1:42; 17. / "Abstract" / 1:37; 18. / "Kowareta Sekai" (壊れた世界, Broken World) / 2:26; 19. / "Rose Garden" / 0:07; 20. / "Concerto" / 0:08; 21. / "Alice Game" / 1:37; 22. / "Bara no Chikai" (薔薇の誓い, The Rose Oath) / 1:36; 23. / "Bara no Jubaku" (薔薇の呪縛, The Rose Curse) / 1:48; 24. / "Zannin na Kōgeki" (残忍な攻撃, Cruel Attack) / 2:00; 25. / "Omocha no Kuni" (おもちゃの国, Toy Land) / 1:53; 26. / "Shukuteki" (宿敵, Old Adversary) / 2:16; 27. / "Bright Red" / 2:46; 28. / "Neat Sister" / 1:27; 29. / "Tenshin Ranman" (天真爛漫, Naïveté) / 1:22; 30. / "Okubyōsha" (臆病者, Coward) / 1:31; 31. / "Jaaku na Takurami" (邪悪なたくらみ, Wicked Designs) / 1:29; 32. / "Barikēdo Sen" (バリケード戦, Barricade Battle) / 1:25; 33. / "Kashimashii Kanojo-tachi" (かしましい彼女たち, Noisy Girls) / 1:08; 34. / "Jōkigen" (上機嫌, Good Humor) / 1:19; 35. / "Funny Dolls" / 1:05; 36. / "Jet Fighters" / 1:50; 37. / "Garden Party" / 2:14; 38. / "Utsukushii Izumi" (美しい泉, Beautiful Fountain) / 2:15; 39. / "Asa no Shokutaku" (朝の食卓; Breakfast Table) / 1:46; 40. / "Tantei Kunkun" (探偵くんくん, Detective Kunkun) / 2:07; 41. / "Hyōkai" (氷解, Melting) / 1:41; 42. / "Kodakai Oka nite" (小高い丘にて, On a Gentle Hill) / 2:52; 43. / "Change" / 1:41; 44. / "Tōmei Shelter <TV size>" (透明シェルター <TV size>, Transparent Shelter <TV size>) / 1:33 | 168 | 1 | |
| 2006 | TV Anime Rozen Maiden: Träumend Original Soundtrack (Note: TVアニメ『ローゼンメイデン・トロイメント』オリジナルサウンドトラック, TV Anime Rōzen Meiden Toroimento Orijinaru Saundotorakku): Released: January 27, 2006; Label: On The Run LHCA-5027; The soundtrack for the anime Rozen Maiden: Träumend | 164 | 2 | |
| 2006 | Rozen Maiden Beilege Disk: Included with the preorder of Rozen Maiden Duellwalzer which released on April 27, 2006.; Label: Taito TAITO-0025; The soundtrack for the game Rozen Maiden Duellwalzer | — | | |
| 2007 | Rozen Maiden Beilege Disk 2: Included with the preorder of Rozen Maiden Gebetgarten which released on March 22, 2007.; Label: Taito TAITO-0035; The soundtrack for the game Rozen Maiden Duellwalzer | — | | |
| 2013 | TV Anime Rozen Maiden Original Soundtrack (Note: TVアニメ『ローゼンメイデン』オリジナルサウンドトラック, TV Anime Rōzen Meiden Orijinaru Saundotorakku): Released: September 25, 2013; Label: Lantis LACA-9307/8; The soundtrack for the anime Rozen Maiden: Zurückspulen | — | | |
"—" denotes releases that did not chart.

== Radio dramas ==
| Year | Title | Charts | | Ref. |
| Year | Title | Peak | Weeks | Ref. |
|---|---|---|---|---|
| 2004 | Drama CD Rozen Maiden (Note: ドラマCD Rozen Maiden, Dorama CD Rozen Maiden): Released: July 25, 2004; Label: Frontier Works AFC-3010; A re-enactment of the first seven manga chapters. | — | | |
| 2005 | TV Anime Rozen Maiden Original Drama (Detectiv) (Note: TVアニメ『ローゼンメイデン』オリジナルドラマ～『探偵』Detektiv～, TV Anime Rōzen Meiden Orijinaru Dorama ~"Tantei" Detektiv~): Released: February 2, 2005; Label: On The Run LHCA-5004; Shinku, Hinaichigo, and Suiseiseki investigate the disappearance of their toy doll, Kun Kun. | 176 | 1 | |
| 2005 | Rozen Maiden: Rose Scented Garden Party CD special (Note: 『ローゼンメイデン・ウェブラジオ 薔薇の香りのGarden Party』CDスペシャル, Rōzen Meiden Uebu Rajio Bara no Kaori no Garden Pātī CD Supesharu): Released: September 22, 2005; Label: On The Run LHCA-5018; A recording of the internet radio Rozen Maiden Web Radio: Rose Scented Garden Party. | — | | |
| 2006 | Memories of Garden Party: Included with the limited edition of Rozen Maiden: Träumend Volume 1 DVD which released on January 18, 2006.; A recording of the internet radio Rozen Maiden Web Radio: Rose Scented Garden Party. | — | | |
| 2006 | TV Anime Rozen Maiden Träumend Original Drama (Note: TVアニメ「ローゼンメイデン・トロイメント」オリジナルドラマCD, TV Anime Rōzen Meiden Toroimento Orijinaru Dorama): Released: February 22, 2006; Label: On The Run LHCA-5030; An anthology based on Jun Sakuraba with a cold. | 92 | 2 | |
| 2006 | TV Anime Rozen Maiden Träumend Character Drama Vol.1 Suigintou (Note: TVアニメ「ローゼンメイデン・トロイメント」キャラクタードラマ Vol. 1水銀橙, TV Anime Rōzen Meiden Toroimento Kyarakutā Dorama Vol. 1 Suigintō): Released: August 23, 2006; Label: On The Run LHCA-5047; An anthology based Suigintou's relationship with her master Megu Kakizaki. | 113 | 1 | |
| 2006 | TV Anime Rozen Maiden Träumend Character Drama Vol.2 Kanaria (Note: TVアニメ「ローゼンメイデン・トロイメント」キャラクタードラマ Vol. 2金糸雀, TV Anime Rōzen Meiden Toroimento Kyarakutā Dorama Vol. 2 Kanaria): Released: September 22, 2006; Label: On The Run LHCA-5047; An anthology based on Kanaria's attempt to sneak into the Sakuraba home. | 146 | 1 | |
| 2006 | TV Anime Rozen Maiden Träumend Character Drama Vol.3 Suiseiseki (Note: TVアニメ「ローゼンメイデン・トロイメント」キャラクタードラマ Vol. 3翠星石, TV Anime Rōzen Meiden Toroimento Kyarakutā Dorama Vol. 3 Suiseiseki): Released: October 25, 2006; Label: On The Run LHCA-5054; An anthology based on Suiseiseki adjusting to her life at the Sakuraba home. | 89 | 1 | |
| 2006 | TV Anime Rozen Maiden Träumend Character Drama Vol.4 Souseiseki (Note: TVアニメ「ローゼンメイデン・トロイメント」キャラクタードラマ Vol. 4蒼星石, TV Anime Rōzen Meiden Toroimento Kyarakutā Dorama Vol. 4 Sōseiseki): Released: November 22, 2006; Label: Lantis LHCA-5055; An anthology based on Souseiseki contemplating about the Alice Game. | 155 | 1 | |
| 2007 | TV Anime Rozen Maiden Träumend Character Drama Vol.5 Shinku (Note: TVアニメ「ローゼンメイデン・トロイメント」キャラクタードラマ Vol. 5真紅, TV Anime Rōzen Meiden Toroimento Kyarakutā Dorama Vol. 5 Shinku): Released: January 24, 2007; Label: Lantis LHCA-5056; An anthology based on Shinku's daily life. | 90 | 1 | |
| 2007 | TV Anime Rozen Maiden Träumend Character Drama Vol.6 Hinaichigo (Note: TVアニメ「ローゼンメイデン・トロイメント」キャラクタードラマ Vol. 6雛苺, TV Anime Rōzen Meiden Toroimento Kyarakutā Dorama Vol. 6 Hinaichigo): Released: February 7, 2007; Label: Lantis LHCA-5061; An anthology based on Hinaichigo and her previous master, Tomoe Kashiwaba, spending time together. | 126 | 1 | |
| 2007 | Suigintou's Night of Ennui (Note: 水銀燈の今宵もアンニュ～イ, Suigintou no Koyoi mo Annyu~i): Included with the limited edition of Rozen Maiden: Ouvertüre DVD which released on February 21, 2007.; A radio drama hosted by Rie Tanaka, Suigintou's voice actress. | — | | |
| 2007 | TV Anime Rozen Maiden Träumend Character Drama Vol.7 Bara-Suisho (Note: TVアニメ「ローゼンメイデン・トロイメント」キャラクタードラマ Vol. 7薔薇水晶, TV Anime Rōzen Meiden Toroimento Kyarakutā Dorama Vol. 7 Barasuishō): Released: March 7, 2007; Label: Lantis LHCA-9003 | 140 | 1 | |
| 2007 | Extra Edition Suigintou's Night of Ennui (Note: 番外編 水銀燈の今宵もアンニュ～イ, Bangai-Hen Suigintou no Koyoi mo Annyu~i): Released: March 21, 2007; Label: Lantis LHCA-5069; A radio drama hosted by Rie Tanaka, Suigintou's voice actress. | 105 | 1 | |
| 2007 | Suigintou's Night of Ennui Vol.2 (Note: 水銀燈の今宵もアンニュ～イ Vol.2, Bangai-Hen Suigintou no Koyoi mo Annyu~i Vol.2): Released: June 27, 2007; Label: Lantis LHCA-5073; A radio drama hosted by Rie Tanaka, Suigintou's voice actress. | 121 | 1 | |
| 2007 | Suigintou's Night of Ennui Vol.3 (Note: 水銀燈の今宵もアンニュ～イ Vol.3, Bangai-Hen Suigintou no Koyoi mo Annyu~i Vol.3): Released: December 5, 2007; Label: Lantis LHCA-5083; A radio drama hosted by Rie Tanaka, Suigintou's voice actress. | 113 | 1 | |
| 2007 | Suigintou's Night of Ennui (Animage Special) (Note: 水銀燈の今宵もアンニュ～イ ［アニメージュ・スペシャル］, Bangai-Hen Suigintou no Koyoi mo Annyu~i [Animēju Supesharu]): Included with Animage issue January 2008 released on December 10, 2007.; A radio drama hosted by Rie Tanaka, Suigintou's voice actress. | — | | |
| 2007 | TV Anime Rozen Maiden Träumend Original Drama CD Vol.2 (While Listening to Christmas Songs) (Note: TVアニメ「ローゼンメイデン・トロイメント」オリジナルドラマCD Vol.2～クリスマスソングを聴きながら～, TV Anime Rōzen Meiden Toroimento Orijinaru Dorama CD Vol.2 ~Kurisumasu Songu o Kikinagara~): Released: December 21, 2007; Label: Lantis LHCA-9003 | 204 | 1 | |
| 2013 | TV Anime Rozen Maiden Drama CD (Note: TVアニメ『ローゼンメイデン』ドラマCD, TV Anime Rōzen Meiden Dorama CD): Released: October 23, 2013; Label: Lantis LHCA-15351 | — | | |
"—" denotes releases that did not chart.

== Notes ==
Notes
