= Zombie-Loan =

2007 manga series and its anime adaptation

- Japanese cover of Zombie-Loan volume 1
- Manga
- Written by: Peach-Pit
- Published by: Square Enix
- English publisher: NA: Yen Press
- Magazine: Monthly GFantasy
- Original run: November 2002 – March 2011
- Volumes: 13
- Anime television series
- Directed by: Akira Nishimori
- Produced by: Kenji Ōta; Tomoko Takahashi; Shinao Shimoji
- Written by: Atsuhiro Tomioka
- Music by: Hiroyuki Sawano
- Studio: Xebec M2
- Licensed by: NA: Discotek Media
- Original network: TV Asahi
- Original run: July 3, 2007 – September 11, 2007
- Episodes: 13

Zombie-Loan (stylized as ZOMBIE-LOAN) is a Japanese manga series created by Peach-Pit: Banri Sendo and Shibuko Ebara. It is published by Square Enix and is serialized in the Japanese shōnen manga magazine Monthly GFantasy. The series is licensed in the United States by Yen Press.

An anime adaptation produced by Xebec M2 was announced and started broadcast on the Japanese network TV Asahi on July 3, 2007. It ran for a total of eleven episodes, with the final broadcast on September 11, 2007. Subsequent episodes 12 and 13 were released as part of the seventh volume of the DVD release in April 2008, but no television broadcast has been made. The anime has been licensed by Discotek Media; they released the complete series on DVD on September 30, 2014.

== Plot ==
Michiru Kita possesses the Shinigami Eyes, a power which allows her to see a person's closeness to death by seeing a ring around the person's neck. When a person is marked to die, a gray ring appears, which darkens over time. Once the ring turns pitch black, the person dies. Chika Akatsuki and Shito Tachibana, two boys in her class, both have black rings around their necks, but are still alive. It is revealed that after an accident that was supposed to kill them both, the two made a deal with Zombie-Loan. In return for keeping them alive, the two have to hunt zombies to pay back their debt. When they find out about Michiru's ability, they want her to find people with rings in order to eliminate them. The next day she was almost killed but brought back to life. After hunting Zombies in an episodic fashion, Chika and Shito defect from Zombie Loan and head to China in an attempt to save Shito's mother from the Xu-Fu. However, the Xu-Fu captures Shito and attempts to use his body as a vessel for Lao Ye, their leader. Lao Ye is eventually defeated, and the duo returns to Zombie Loan.

Soon after, Ferryman begins to delete zombies for the sake of the Akashic records and has targeted the Zombie Loan. As they progress through the world of the Ferryman, they become involved in the affairs of a Ferryman who attempts to use records to destroy the world. Michiru discovers her powers result from her being an irregularity of the records as she was meant to die as a stillborn. Using her powers, she reverses time through the Akashic records, removing its irregularities and zombies. The series ends in a new timeline with Michiru witnessing Chika and Shito's accident on television and Bekko announcing the reopening of Zombie Loan.

== Characters ==
=== Main Characters ===
Michiru Kita (紀多 みちる, Kita Michiru)
Voiced by: Houko Kuwashima
Chika Akatsuki (赤月 知佳, Akatsuki Chika)
Voiced by: Kenichi Suzumura
Shito Tachibana (橘 思徒, Tachbana Shito)
Voiced by: Takahiro Sakurai

=== Antagonists ===
==== Mafia Xu Fu ====
Touhou
Voiced by: Yasunori Masutani
Lao Ye

==== Akashic Record Reform Committee ====
Yoshizumi
Voiced by: Junji Majima
Carmella (カルメラ, Karumera)
Voiced by: Satsuki Yukino
Chitose
Voiced by: Chihiro Suzuki
Neli

== Manga ==
The Zombie-Loan manga created by the Peach-Pit duo, Banri Sendo and Shibuko Ebara, was first published in May 2003. It is published by Enix and is serialized in the Japanese shōnen manga magazine Monthly GFantasy. The thirteenth and final volume was released in April 2011. The manga was released in North America by Yen Press from 2007 to 2012.

== Anime ==
An anime adaptation produced by Xebec M2 was announced and started broadcast on the Japanese network TV Asahi on July 3, 2007. The Zombie-Loan anime series which soundtrack was composed by Hiroyuki Sawano first aired on TV Asahi on July 3, 2007, airing Tuesdays at 13:40 in Japan. The anime series was recently licensed by Discotek Media, and a Region 1 DVD release on September 30, 2014, was announced through their Facebook page. A total of 11 episodes aired with the final episode airing on September 11, 2007. Subsequent episodes 12 and 13 were released on the seventh Region 2 DVD, but no official word for television broadcast has been made. In them, a new story arc was started but not completed.

The animation uses the opening Ōkami no Nodo (オオカミのノド, lit. 'Wolf's Throat') composed by Yusuke Chiba (チバユウスケ, Chiba Yūsuke) of the group the Birthday and the ending theme Chein Ringu (チェインリング, "Chain Ring") composed by SatoChi (SATOち, Satochi) in the group Mucc.

=== Episode list ===
No.	Title	Original release date
1	"Grim Reaper Eyes" "Shinigami no Me" (死神の目)	July 3, 2007
A girl named Michiru Kita can see the ring that appears on a person's neck when they are about to die. After seeing it on two boys in her class, she seeks to warn them, only to discover that the boys are already dead, but are still walking around hunting down dangerous zombies due to a contract with Zombie-Loan. They try to use Michiru's "Shinigami eyes" to their advantage, much to Michiru's dismay. Before Michiru goes to bed that night, she notices a faint ring appearing on her neck, which means she will die soon.
2	"Want To Die?" "Ittoku?" (逝っとく?)	July 10, 2007
Recently, people have been disappearing in Michiru's school, so Shito and Chika investigate the incident. They ask Michiru to help them, but she is more concerned about the ring that she saw around her neck. However, when Michiru finds out that her friend has gone missing, she decides to look for her friend at the school. Later, in the midst of Chika and Shito's battle with the zombie responsible for the disappearances, Michiru is fatally wounded. She wakes up at the Zombie Loan office and finds that her ring is gone, to which Bekkō informs her that Shito and Chika has incurred additional debt in exchange for saving her life.
3	"Dead Man's Tongue" "Shisha no Shita" (死者の舌)	July 17, 2007
Now that Michiru works for the Zombie-Loan office, she moves out of her relatives' place by using her deceased parents' estate to pay off any favors rather than letting her aunt and uncle usurp her inheritance. Shimotsuki Kuze introduces Michiru to the dormitory she is to live in, as she satisfies the special criteria for residence. Chika, who is still claiming to be using her for her Shinigami Eyes, introduces her to the various strange people who work at Zombie Loan and they throw a welcoming party for Michiru. After the party, she gets her first kiss stolen by a female student's "other personality", Yomi, which the Z-Loan office members would later use to their advantage. The next day, when she ends up going to work with Chika, they meet an old acquaintance of his.
4	"Butterfly Flutter" "Chō no Haoto" (蝶の羽音)	July 24, 2007
Chika's old acquaintance, Reiichirou Shiba, helps Chika and Michiru out of a jam. Shiba then tags along with the two to the Z-Loan office, where Shito instantly points his gun at him. Chika convinces everyone that he is of no harm. Meanwhile, a new addition to the office is introduced, in order to help them with their upcoming job.
5	"Sacrifice" "Nie" (贄)	July 31, 2007
When the office investigates a mysterious "butterfly" group, Koyomi and Michiru get mistaken as two of its members due to the butterfly symbols on their shirts. However, they get found out after Michiru tells them how bad it is to kill people, so Yomi comes to Michiru's rescue when they attack her. When Shito, Chika, and Shiba arrive, they follow the leader of the group and kills him, but it is later revealed that the zombie they killed was not the real leader.
6	"Longing for Freedom" "Jiyū e no Katsubō" (自由への渇望)	August 7, 2007
As Shito and Chika battle Shiba, a flashback is shown to show how Shiba became a zombie. During the flashback, Shiba was tired with the same monotonous life he has, so he commits suicide. However, he meets with an unknown figure promising an "unboring" existence that leads to becoming "free" of his previous, dull life. Wanting to be free, Shiba agreed to work for the person who made him a zombie. Meanwhile, as Shiba is about to fall off the roof, Chika takes hold of his hand, but as Shiba falls, a shinigami comes to take him away. After the situation with Shiba, the others ponder about what happens after zombies die.
7	"A Wandering Heart" "Samayō Kokoro" (彷徨う心)	August 14, 2007
The Zombie-Loan group ends up going to a hot spring. There, Michiru finds out the pricing for zombies: the more dangerous, the more money. Also, Shito and Michiru end up being attacked by a wolf-like creature, which they believe to be a zombie. However, they later meet the wolf once again, but this time, they realize that it is actually a man, and rather than a being a zombie, he is actually a werewolf.
8	"Fracture" "Danretsu" (断裂)	August 21, 2007
Two unexpected guests bump into Michiru, Chika's father and sister, Yuri and Momoka, respectively. What surprises Michiru more is that Chika's family is actually a very cheery bunch. Meanwhile, Shito meets up with a man whom he seems to dislike. This person calls him a monster, and tells him that he should not be making friends. Later, Michiru, Chika, and Shito are given a mission to hunt a zombie, but while they are searching, Michiru brings up something that she found in Shito's room. Because of this, Shito gets angry, which is when the two boys get into a fist fight. Shito leaves them, and soon after, a chainsaw suddenly pierces through his stomach.
9	"Living Corpse" "Ikita Shikabane" (生きた屍)	August 28, 2007
The man who calls Shito a monster comes into the Zombie-Loan office and introduces himself as Toho and also as a member of the mafia. He tells them that Shito has been abducted, and that he will take on the task of retrieving Shito himself, since Shito is an important asset to him. Also, Bekkō tells the office some info on Shito's past. Later, another old acquaintance of Chika's show up and decide to help him in his search. Meanwhile, Shito is revealed to be restrained in the enemy's hideout.
10	"The Corpse Release Spell" "Shikai no Hō" (尸解の法)	September 4, 2007
Michiru, Chika and Sotetsu arrive late at night at a closed JRail station which is rumored to be haunted. Their aim is to seek out the Grim Reaper who like the master of the black rings, knows of all souls passing through the dimensions. Preparing to engage the reaper for information on Shito's whereabouts, they are surprised that he has become super deformed, as a result of losing his Astral power core as thus, his body. Having a soft spot for such cute characters, Michiru takes the reaper along in their investigation. Meanwhile, Otsu follows his own leads on a suspicious mortician at his workplace as the groups end up together to confront the mastermind of Shito's kidnapping.
11	"Life and Death" "Inochi to, Shi to" (命と、死と)	September 11, 2007
Chika finds Shito and they reunite to fight the twisted doctor Yoshizumi, who is absorbed into his ultimate golem creation. Otsu saves the day by putting an agent that Nogi created into Yoshizimi, causing him to fall apart. Shito saves the girl golem, but she ends up dying when Nogi shoots her in the head as part of "cleaning up". Shito then beats up Nogi and gives the golem a proper human burial.
12	"Wheel of Destiny" "Unmei no Wa" (運命の輪)	April 2008
Everyone at Z-Loan throws Shito a welcome back party while Koyomi tells Michiru about an embarrassing secret over her drinking Fanta. Also, zombies Zen, Toko, and Shuji, from A-LOAN, a new rival team, appears.
13	"We Want to Protect" "Mamoritai" (守りたい)	April 2008
A battle is unlocked as both A-Loan and Z-Loan must make 10,000,000 yen before the other. Though it comes with a heavy price, for the loser will have all of their zombies terminated, including Michiru. Chika then becomes jealous of Zen when Michiru shows him kindness. Z-Loan is disheartened because A-Loan takes a quick lead in the competition with superior weapons. Zarame the Grim Reaper decides to help Michiru hone her Zombie finding powers, the first zombie she finds however, is the Undertaker, who has reluctantly returned to aid Z-Loan. They eventually find their determination and renew their will to compete, to save their company.

== Reception ==
"Besides having an intense and clever idea for a plot, Zombie Loan has a few great twists in it that only make it all the more fun to read." — Danica Davidson, Graphic Novel Reporter.
