= DearS =

Media franchise

- Cover art of first Tokyopop manga featuring Ren

ディアーズ (Diāzu)
- Manga
- Written by: Peach-Pit
- Published by: MediaWorks
- English publisher: NA: Tokyopop
- Magazine: Dengeki Comic Gao!; Dengeki Maoh
- Original run: October 2001 – November 2005
- Volumes: 8
- Anime television series
- Directed by: Iku Suzuki
- Produced by: Hisanori Kunisaki; Nobuhiro Ōsawa; Takayasu Hatano
- Written by: Takao Yoshioka
- Music by: Tomoki Hasegawa
- Studio: Daume
- Licensed by: NA: Discotek Media
- Original network: Television Kanagawa, Chiba TV
- Original run: July 10, 2004 – September 26, 2004
- Episodes: 13
- Video game
- Developer: MediaWorks
- Publisher: MediaWorks
- Genre: Visual novel
- Platform: PlayStation 2
- Released: June 24, 2004

DearS (ディアーズ, Diāzu) is an ecchi shōnen Japanese manga series co-written and illustrated by Banri Sendo and Shibuko Ebara, credited under their pen name Peach-Pit. It was serialized monthly by MediaWorks in their magazines Dengeki Comic Gao! from October 2001 to September 2005 and Dengeki Maoh from October to November 2005 and was later published into ten volumes by the company. The manga was licensed and translated into English by Tokyopop. A 13-episode anime was adapted by MSJ and a PlayStation 2 video game was produced by MediaWorks.

== Plot ==
Exactly one year prior to the beginning of DearS, humanity made unprecedented contact with extraterrestrial life. Forced to crash-land into Tokyo Bay when on the way to their home planet of Thanatos, their spacecraft breaks down, 150 humanoid aliens are naturalized into Japanese society and lovingly nicknamed "DearS"; a portmanteau of the words "Dear" and "Friends". The crashed aliens consist entirely of individuals from a genetically modified "slave race" designed to enjoy slavery.

Takeya Ikuhara is a temperamental seventeen-year-old Japanese student attending the fictional Koharu High School with a strong prejudice against the DearS. Due to a childhood trauma, he believes that the aliens are fake, worthless beings who have generated nationwide overhype and are secretly plotting to take control of Earth.

On his way home from school, Takeya discovers a homeless DearS who, after fainting and much to his annoyance, he feeds and shelters in his apartment. The girl, who he gives the nickname Ren, is friendly yet immature and grows obsequious and dependent upon Takeya. She calls him "Master", a responsibility Takeya tries to disassociate himself from. However, her oblivious persistence keeps her around. Over time, she realizes Ren's genuine care and empathy for him, Takeya has a change of heart. Unfortunately, because Ren is deemed defective, DearS headquarters order her arrest.

=== Characters ===
==== Main ====
Takeya Ikuhara (幾原 武哉, Ikuhara Takeya)
Takeya is a fastidious and impetuous student. His life becomes complicated when he becomes the unwanted target of affection and servility by a young female DearS, a citizen of the very people he dislikes. Despite this rather immature prejudice, over the course of her stay and companionship with him, Takeya grows fond and solicitous of the girl, opening up more to his peers as well.
Ren (レン, Ren)
Lost during shipment and freed from containment, Ren is found homeless by Takeya, who she immediately forces a covenant between and is subsequently given shelter by much to his displeasure.
Neneko Izumi (和泉 寧々子, Izumi Neneko)
Neneko Izumi is a droopy-eyed student and daughter of the apartment landlord, of which she is a tenant of.
Miu (ミゥ, Myu)
Shia Nostal Ren Naguregyug Thanast Useim Ruki Miu (シーア•ノスタル•レン•ナグレグユグ•タナスト•ァウセーム•ルキ•ミゥ, Shīa Nostaru Ren Naguregyugu Tanasuto Usēmu Ruki Miu), better known by her short name Miu, is a young female DearS. Intelligent yet sometimes conceited, Miu is a student who is assigned to study abroad at Koharu High and resides locally as a homestay.

==== Supporting ====
Mitsuka Yoshimine (芳峰 蜜香, Yoshimine Mitsuka)
The main characters' knockout teacher, Mitsuka is both intelligent and resourceful. She is also a flirtatious exhibitionist who spends more time conniving to "show off" to her students than she does teaching them English. Mitsuka has a habit of popping up when it is least convenient to Takeya and company, turning normal conversations into overly embarrassing situations, usually by mistaking most things for sexual acts.
Hikoro Oikawa (及川 彦郎, Oikawa Hikorō)
Takeya's male friend, Hikoro is goofy and more than a little shallow but remains a decent young man.
Khi (キィ, Kī)
Khi is a soft-spoken DearS exchange student who goes to the same school as Takeya's sister Natsuki
Natsuki Ikuhara (幾原 菜月, Ikuhara Natsuki)
Natsuki is Takeya's little sister who has been away overseas. Takeya is shown to be protective of her and has even expressed displeasure at the possibility of her and Khi becoming more than friends.
Harumi Ikuhara (幾原 晴海, Ikuhara Harumi)
Harumi is Takeya's stepmother and one of the few people who can take care of her rambunctious daughter, Natsuki.
Rubi (ルビ)
The somewhat dominatrix-like "Barker", Rubi is second-in-command of the DearS colony. Quite big-breasted like Ren, she is almost never seen without her whip in hand. Rubi has proven to be strict, and often cruel, particularly to Khi, using her whip on him to express her displeasure.
Xaki (ザキ, Zaki)
Xaki is the "Biter" sent by the DearS colony to retrieve Ren. He is also a mentor to cat-like DearS Nia, who aspires to become a Biter herself. Xaki believes he is the gift for Hirofumi, which leads to some awkward situations.
Nia (ニア)
Nia is Xaki's cat-like apprentice. She is quite a flake and often forgets her assignments, even the ones she assigns herself, such as challenging Ren when Xaki fails to retrieve the wayward Zero Number.

== Media ==
=== Manga ===
DearS began as a manga co-written and illustrated by Banri Sendo and Shibuko Ebara, credited under their pen name Peach-Pit, which was serialized in MediaWorks' Dengeki Comic Gao! manga magazine from October 2001 to November 2005. The manga was compiled into ten tankōbon volumes released by MediaWorks in Japan.

No.	Original release date	Original ISBN	English release date	English ISBN
1	March 2002	978-4-8402-2086-6	January 11, 2005	978-1-59532-308-8
Chapters 1–6
2	September 27, 2002	978-4-8402-2206-8	April 12, 2005	978-1-59532-309-5
Chapters 7–12
3	March 2003	978-4-8402-2343-0	July 12, 2005	978-1-59532-310-1
Chapters 13–18
4	September 27, 2003	978-4-8402-2478-9	October 11, 2005	978-1-59532-311-8
Chapters 19–23; Extra Contact; Spring Contact; Character Gallery
5	March 27, 2004	978-4-8402-2651-6	January 10, 2006	978-1-59532-797-0
Chapters 24–28; Setting Data Collection
6	August 27, 2004	978-4-8402-2797-1	April 11, 2006	978-1-59532-798-7
Chapters 29–33
7	March 26, 2005	978-4-8402-3011-7	July 3, 2006	978-1-59816-185-4
Chapters 34–39
8	December 17, 2005	978-4-8402-3289-0	November 7, 2006	978-1-59816-861-7
Chapters 40–46; Later Contact

=== Anime ===
DearS was adapted into a twelve-episode anime and single original video animation by MSJ with co-production by Bandai Visual, Geneon Entertainment, Lantis, and Team DearS. The series was directed by Iku Suzuki. The anime aired on Chiba TV, TV Kanagawa, TV Saitama, Tokyo MX TV, TV Santerebi, TV Aichi, and TVQ Kyushu from July 10 to September 26, 2004.

No.	Title	Original release date
1	"I Want to Nibble Sweet"; Transliteration: "Amakamitai no" (Japanese: 甘噛みたいの)	July 10, 2004
Crossing over a bridge, an unidentified box truck overturns at the sight of a stray cat in the road, spilling a human capsule from its cargo (which shows Exposition). On his way back from school, Takeya encounters and rescues a mysterious Dears from being run over by a delivery truck. After proclaiming servility to him, and then shortly fainting, he takes her to his apartment where she is washed, clothed, fed melonpan and given the name Ren. Meanwhile back at the bridge, Rubi and Khi discover the lost capsule.
2	"Was It Too Small?"; Transliteration: "Chiisakatta Kashira?" (Japanese: 小さかったかしら)	July 17, 2004
After a nightmarish and erratic morning, Neneko mistakenly discovers Ren during an unexpected visit, and examining the situation, assigns Takeya the job of teaching her Japanese. He indifferently teaches her nothing and eventually falls asleep, during which time a telepathy Ren learns all the material and gains the ability to speak the language, though in a slightly broken manner. In this more fluent condition, Neneko and Takeya bring Ren to a mall to shop for new clothes. Elsewhere, Miu finishes up her admission to Koharu High with Khi.
3	"Ball! Ball!"; Transliteration: "Tama! Tama!" (Japanese: たま！たま！)	July 24, 2004
When Miu acquaints with her assigned homestay, an elderly couple she calls her grandparents. Meanwhile, upon being scolded by Takeya for her nakedness, Ren decides to clean the apartment by defenestrating his furniture and trash; Neneko empathetically awarding her yesterdays shopping change in return. Xaki instructs Nia to apprehend Ren. The following morning Ren visits the market, and drawn by the scent of melonpan, buys a bag of it; Nia botching her capture and leaving absentmindedly. Ren visits Takeya at school, causing an uproar that settles when she is believed to be a substitute for Miu and that Takeya is her homestay sponsor. Tired and confused, Takeya and Ren retreat home.
4	"Wipe Your Mouth"; Transliteration: "Kuchi o Fuke" (Japanese: 口をふけ)	July 31, 2004
Ren begins her first day of school and assimilates quite well. Miu arrives, only to learn of her replacement, she charges Ren and refuses to coincide with her as the student diplomat. In response, the school holds three duels: a 100-yard dash, liberal arts test, and cook-off. While Miu effectively wins 3–1, she forfeits the last challenge. Nevertheless, the principal asks both girls to stay; Miu vowing to watch Ren attentively.
5	"Partners?"; Transliteration: "Togi...?" (Japanese: トギ。。。？)	August 7, 2004
Confused confused about Ren, Takeya grows rash towards her. Miu helps to explain the situation and supervises her after class. That night, Khi visits Miu to collect information on Ren while uncontrollably aroused by her body back at the apartment. Sensing this, Ren comforts a distraught Takeya.
6	"I Am So Frustrated"; Transliteration: "Yokkyū Fuman desu wa" (Japanese: 欲求不満ですわ)	August 14, 2004
Takeya stops Ren from sexually advancing, calling it too soon. Slightly awkward from this, he avoids contact with her for most of the day. Miu invites herself to reform Ren by showing her to cook and gaily decorating the apartment. As Takeya throws out the flashy new room additions, he is hastily tackled by his step-sister, Natsuki Ikuhara.
7	"Pervert"; Transliteration: "Iyarashii..." (Japanese: いやらしい。。。)	August 21, 2004
Takeya, Natsuki, Neneko and Ren spend time walking around an amusement park before returning home. When Natsuki misunderstands Ren and Takeya's cohabitation, she becomes aggressively jealous toward Ren and tries to drive her off. Neneko and Natsuki girls eventually make up, but not before Harumi arrives to pick her daughter up. Once relationship patched at the airport, Neneko, Takeya and Ren say goodbye to Harumi and Natsuki as they leave to catch a flight. Miu summons Khi and tells him she has plans to drop out of school.
8	"M...My Ball"; Transliteration: "Ma, Mai Bōru..." (Japanese: マ、マイ・ボール。。。)	August 28, 2004
In a flashback, a gross man lies on a floor attacks Miu as she desperately tries, but fails to stop it. Back at school, still feeling inferior to and jealous of Ren, Miu challenges her to another contest: a Dears game called Palaga. During the game, Miu and Takeya fall into a water well and cannot leave immediately. They sit and talk about the Dears enslavement and Miu's past, in which the man from the previous sequence being her ex-master who was gunned down. Overcoming her past and discovering the well is in the back of her homestay, Miu flies them both out while Takeya met by an excited Ren.
9	"It Hurt A Little"; Transliteration: "Chikutoshita" (Japanese: チクッとした)	September 4, 2004
Returning from school with Ren and Neneko, Takeya's fear of aliens is revealed to stem from being forced to watch science fiction horror films by Neneko when they were younger. That afternoon, Ren and Miu create a costume wardrobe Neneko has, refusing to model any herself. Takeya's sharp opinion to this offends the departing Neneko, to which he initially refused to apolgize. The following day, although Neneko seems casual and fine, Takeya feels guilty and apologizes for his rudeness the next day.
10	"Is It A Golden Ball?"; Transliteration: "Kane no Tama desu no?" (Japanese: 金の玉ですの？)	OVA
While browsing the market, Miu participates in a lottery. Unbeknownst to her, she wins four tickets to a newly opening bathhouse. Miu invites Takeya, Ren, and Neneko – who all agree to go. During the stay, when separated into unisexual baths, Ren goes searching for Takeya, while Nia fly through a high window and passing out from the fall. With Yoshimine distracting the commotion, the group escapes the building. Seen aboard an incoming flight is Harumi and Natsuki.
11	"Lets Have an Orgy!"; Transliteration: "Rankō suru desu ni!" (Japanese: らんこーするですに！)	September 11, 2004
Natsuki and Harumi visit Takeya and Ren at the apartment. The next morning at school, Yoshimine announces that students who have failed three or more classes must spend all of the following weeks being tutored. In response, Neneko, Ren, Miu, and Hikoro go to Takeya's apartment to study together – misunderstood by Yoshimine as an orgy. Takeya leaves to get the group snacks, meeting Nia who he talks with. As Natsuki finds her brother – misinformed by Yoshimine – the market draws attention to a stranded kitten atop a power line pole, retrieved by Nia and saved by Natsuki. Both girls return with Takeya to the apartment where Khi visits to retrieve Nia.
12	"Do You Want To Experience It?"; Transliteration: "Keiken... Shite Miru?" (Japanese: 経験。。。してみる？)	September 18, 2004
During school, Khi visits Miu to inform her that Ren's confirmation ceremony is to be annulled. After two embarrassing incidents, Takeya distances himself from her; being asked by Yoshimine to fetch class textbooks. Ren goes to collect the material but goes into the wrong room, meeting Hirofumi. Talking out her sexual interests, Hirofumi feels led on and embraces Ren, interrupted by Takeya who finds her. Returning from work to Khi and Miu, he is informed that Ren will be recalled. As a shocked Takeya sits, Xaki locates Ren in the market.
13	"Furthermore It Was Hot"; Transliteration: "Shika mo Atsukatta" (Japanese: しかも熱かった)	September 25, 2004
In the apartment, Khi explains to Takeya in detail the reason for the recall. Back at the market, Xaki gives chase to Ren but is dissuaded when a mob of storekeepers come to her aid. As a confused Ren returns and settles home, Takeya divorces ownership of her while Khi makes a schedule to pick her up the next day. When Ren bids goodbye at school, she eludes Khi and is pursued by Xaki once more. Upset at this, the entire school assembles to help, with Yoshihime riding a motorcycle alongside Takeya to Ren. Following a scuffle with Xaki, an empathetic Takeya changes his mind and makes it his final decision to be Ren's master, canceling the recall. Rubi is shocked and defeated.

=== Video game ===
A video game adaptation was developed and published by MediaWorks for the PlayStation 2. It was released on June 24, 2004. It received a C rating by the Computer Entertainment Rating Organization.
