= Andy Mullins (actor) =

American voice actor (born 1960)

- Born: 1960 (age 64–65)
- Occupation: Voice Actor

Andy Mullins (born 1960) is an American voice actor who works for the anime series of Funimation. He provided voices for a number of English-language versions of Japanese anime films.

== Filmography ==
=== Anime ===
- Baki the Grappler - Dickson
- Basilisk - Nankoubou Tenkai
- Case Closed - Dirk Copeland, Stanley Evans
- D.Gray-man - Akuma, Cook
- Desert Punk - Additional Voices
- El Cazador de la Bruja - Senator Ritgen
- Fairy Tail - Yajeel
- Fullmetal Alchemist - Father Cornello
- Fullmetal Alchemist: Brotherhood - Father Cornello
- The Galaxy Railways - Heigorō Tōdō, Commander, Additional Voices
- Ghost Hunt - Dr. Oliver Davis
- My Bride Is a Mermaid - Nagasumi's Father
- One Piece - Don Krieg, Wapol, Elizabello II
- Rebuild of Evangelion - Additional Voices
- Speed Grapher - Yumoto
- A Certain Magical Index - Aiwass

=== Video games ===
- Fullmetal Alchemist 2: Curse of the Crimson Elixir - Father Cornello
- The Gunstringer - Additional Voices
- One Piece: Unlimited Adventure - Don Krieg
