= My Bride Is a Mermaid =

Japanese manga series

- First tankōbon volume cover, featuring (from left to right) Gozaburo Seto, Nagasumi Michishio and Sun Seto

瀬戸の花嫁 (Seto no Hanayome)
- Genre: Harem; Romantic comedy
- Manga
- Written by: Tahiko Kimura
- Published by: Square Enix
- Magazine: Monthly Gangan Wing (2002–08); Monthly Gangan Joker (2010)
- Original run: July 26, 2002 – November 22, 2010
- Volumes: 16
- Anime television series
- Directed by: Seiji Kishi
- Written by: Makoto Uezu
- Music by: Yasuharu Takanashi
- Studio: Gonzo; AIC
- Licensed by: Crunchyroll (Note: In North America through Crunchyroll, LLC (formerly Funimation), Australia via Crunchyroll Store Australia (formerly Madman Anime) and British Isles via Crunchyroll UK and Ireland (formerly Manga Entertainment)); SG: Odex
- Original network: TV Tokyo
- Original run: April 1, 2007 – September 30, 2007
- Episodes: 26
- Original video animation
- Directed by: Seiji Kishi
- Written by: Makoto Uezu
- Studio: Gonzo; AIC
- Released: November 28, 2008 – January 30, 2009
- Runtime: 30 minutes each
- Episodes: 2
- icon

My Bride Is a Mermaid (Japanese: 瀬戸の花嫁, Hepburn: Seto no Hanayome; lit. 'The Inland Sea Bride') is a Japanese manga series written by Tahiko Kimura. The manga was serialized in Square Enix's shōnen manga magazine Monthly Gangan Wing from 2002 to 2008 and in Monthly Gangan Joker in 2010. In 2004, a drama CD based on the series was released by Frontier Works. The series tells a story of a young mermaid who saves a young boy named Nagasumi Michisio from drowning. To avoid death, Nagasumi chooses the option to marry her.

A 26-episode anime television series adaptation animated by Gonzo, directed by Seiji Kishi, and written by Makoto Uezu aired in Japan on TV Tokyo between April and September 2007. Two original video animation episodes were released in November 2008 and January 2009. Odex, a Singaporean distributor, released it in English in Singapore as Seto No Hana Yome.

== Plot ==
The series revolves around a young teenage boy named Nagasumi Michishio. One day during his summer vacation at the Seto Inland Sea, Nagasumi is saved from drowning by a mermaid named Sun Seto. Under mermaid law however, either the mermaid whose identity was revealed or the human who saw the mermaid must be executed. In an attempt to save both Nagasumi and Sun's lives, Sun's family (which is the head of a mermaid Yakuza group) reluctantly decides that the two are to be married. Sun's father Gōzaburō is enraged about his daughter's sudden marriage. Between Gōzaburō's constant attempts on his life and the madcap antics of a slew of antagonists, Nagasumi has a hard time transitioning into his new married lifestyle.

== Characters ==
=== Michishio family ===
Nagasumi Michishio (満潮 永澄, Michishio Nagasumi)
Voiced by: Takahiro Mizushima (Japanese); Todd Haberkorn (English)
Nagasumi stands out as the most sensible member of his family, aside from his grandmother. Though usually timid, he exhibits surprising strength in dire situations, entering a heightened state—triggered by his ahoge—that allows him to evade nearly any threat. He chooses to marry Sun despite fierce opposition from most of the Seto group, except Ren and Masa. Over time, his initial sense of duty blossoms into genuine love, which he openly declares. Sun's Song of Heroes enhances his abilities in battle, though he can also tap into this power when she is endangered. After Sun saves him from drowning a second time, he proposes, and they share their first kiss.
Nagasumi's father (永澄の父, Nagasumi no Chichi)
Voiced by: Atsushi Imaruoka (Japanese); Andy Mullins (English)
Nagasumi's father often finds himself heartbroken due to his wife's shifting affections. She frequently dotes on Masa, leaving her husband visibly dejected—such as when she prepares a meal exclusively for Masa, leaving him to eat a lonely burger before being scolded by his boss. On another occasion, he sulks at the table after missing dinner, having been too absorbed in his gloom to notice the food. His despair peaks when his wife temporarily falls for Nagasumi, who had unwittingly taken a love potion that made him resemble Masa. Left abandoned, Nagasumi's father sits alone on a playground swing, utterly despondent.
Nagasumi's mother (永澄の母, Nagasumi no Haha)
Voiced by: Noriko Namiki (Japanese); Lydia Mackay (English)
Nagasumi's mother is cheerful and easygoing, though her fondness for Masa often irritates her husband. While her romantic interest in him has waned over time, she remains deeply devoted to her family, including her spouse. She embraces Sun and Lunar as if they were her own daughters, delighting in their presence and treating them with warmth and affection. Her nurturing nature extends to all those close to her, making their home lively and welcoming despite the occasional marital friction.
Nagasumi's grandmother (永澄の祖母, Nagasumi no Sobo)
Voiced by: Eriko Matsushima (Japanese); Juli Erickson (English)
Nagasumi's paternal grandmother resides near the Seto Inland Sea. She briefly appears early in the story, hosting Nagasumi and his family during their visit. Though she does not feature prominently afterward, the family reunites with her once more by the story's conclusion.

=== Seto family ===
Sun Seto (瀬戸 燦, Seto San)
Voiced by: Haruko Momoi (Japanese); Alexis Tipton (English)
Sun is a mermaid and daughter of yakuza leader Gōzaburō Seto. Guided by a strong sense of honor (which she connects to the linguistic similarity between ninkyō (任侠; chivalry) and ningyō (人魚; mermaid)), she takes her role as Nagasumi's wife seriously while genuinely loving him. As a juvenile mermaid, her legs transform back into a tail when wet. She occasionally enters a dramatic "chivalry mode" accompanied by cherry blossoms and enka music. Though usually peaceful, she demonstrates skilled swordsmanship when necessary. Unlike Lunar, Sun employs bodyguards only during conflicts with Lunar's guards. Like most mermaids, she fears cats but can overcome this phobia when needed.
Gozaburo Seto (瀬戸 豪三郎, Seto Gōzaburō)
Voiced by: Kenta Miyake (Japanese); John Swasey (English)
Gōzaburō is a sea dragon and boss of the Seto Group. Though a doting father to Sun, he despises Nagasumi for "stealing" her away. Using his influence, he and his subordinates infiltrate Nagasumi's school as staff, with Gōzaburō becoming their homeroom teacher to monitor Sun. Despite being a powerful yakuza leader with an intimidating presence, he suffers from two crippling fears: cats (stemming from a childhood trauma) and his wife, who punishes him without hesitation. His imposing demeanor often contrasts comically with these vulnerabilities, particularly when confronted by felines or his spouse's wrath.
Ren Seto (瀬戸 蓮, Seto Ren)
Voiced by: Makiko Nabei (Japanese); Stephanie Young (English)
Ren is Sun's mother and a mermaid who supports her daughter's relationship with Nagasumi. As the most feared member of the Seto Group, she maintains discipline among members, including her husband, through harsh punishments. She joins Nagasumi's school as the nurse and enjoys teasing him. Like Sun, she has a "chivalry mode" accompanied by pink petals and her version of "Namida Ichirin" (Ren-san version (-蓮さんver.-)). Despite her kind appearance, she displays typical yakuza behavior when needed. Her name Ren (蓮) means lotus flower, reflecting her elegant but formidable nature.

==== Seto Group members ====
Masa (政)
Voiced by: Katsuki Murase (Japanese); Christopher Sabat (English)
Masa is a Seto Group member and Sun's kendo instructor, recognizable by his sunglasses. After performing CPR on Nagasumi (humorously framed as stealing his first kiss), he becomes Nagasumi's math teacher, using yakuza-themed word problems. Though typically silent, he becomes talkative when drunk. He supports Nagasumi and Sun's relationship, unlike most Seto members. Later revealed as Akeno Shiranui's long-lost brother, he regains memories of his past position (which Akeno inherited) and reconciles with her. Unlike most merfolk, he overcame his fear of cats as a child. His protective nature emerges when defending Akeno from threats.
Maki (巻)
Voiced by: Natsuko Kuwatani (Japanese); Monica Rial (English)
Known as "Spiral Shell" ("conch shell" in the anime), is a petite Seto Group assassin and Sun's loyal companion. She attacks by firing high-velocity water bullets from an endless supply of shells. Opposed to Sun's relationship with Nagasumi—whom she derisively calls "sea louse"—she frequently distracts Sun to ambush him while advocating for a Nagasumi-Lunar pairing. Like most merfolk, she suffers from ailurophobia, though the family cat inexplicably favors her, much to her annoyance. Her small stature belies her deadly accuracy with her signature shell-based weaponry.
Shark Fujishiro (シャーク藤代, Shāku Fujishiro)
Voiced by: Takehito Koyasu (Japanese); Bryan Massey (English)
Shark Fujishiro, a Seto Group member, first attacks Nagasumi during the Michishio family's visit to the Seto home. Having served the clan since Sun's childhood, he later becomes Nagasumi's P.E. teacher. He consistently attempts to eat Nagasumi, believing this would solve all problems and allow everyone to return home. This logic extends to other disruptive individuals, whether they're admirers of Sun/Lunar or even fellow gang members. While often seen sleeping, his unique ability allows him to transform just his head into a shark form. He speaks with a characteristic questioning inflection, regardless of context.
Maguro (マグロ), Burio (ブリ夫) and Ajitaro (アジ太郎)
Voiced by: Kōki Harasawa (Japanese); Chris Cason (English) (Maguro)
Voiced by: Atsushi Imaruoka (Japanese); Sonny Strait (English) (Burio)
Voiced by: Keisuke Fujii (Japanese); Josh Grelle (English) (Ajitaro)
Maguro, Burio, and Ajitaro are bumbling triplets who serve as Gozaburo's elite guards in the Seto Group. Despite their rank, their cowardice and dimwittedness often force others to take command. They debut when summoned to eliminate Nagasumi and a cat, but immediately panic upon seeing the feline. Enrolled as students at Nagasumi's school, they retain fish-like facial features in human form, initially unsettling classmates who eventually grow accustomed to them. The brothers are distinguished by their accessories: Maguro wears a black student cap (sometimes), Burio goes bareheaded, and Ajitaro sports small rounded sunglasses.
Octopus Nakajima (オクトパス中島, Okutopasu Nakajima)
Voiced by: Masashi Yabe (Japanese); Chris Cason (English)
Nakajima, a Seto Group member, is actually a giant octopus who joins Nagasumi's school as a teacher. Unlike other members, he never appears in human form and remains visibly octopus-shaped, often stuck in the school due to his massive size. Several of his tentacles appear to be missing. His presence creates darkly humorous moments, particularly when the school cafeteria serves octopus dishes to students while he remains trapped nearby.

=== Edomae family ===
Lunar Edomae (江戸前 留奈, Edomae Runa)
Voiced by: Sakura Nogawa (Japanese); Cherami Leigh (English)
Lunar, Sun's childhood friend and rival, is a popular idol singer who uses her mermaid voice. Driven by competitiveness, she initially tries to steal Nagasumi from Sun by making him her servant after he sees her true form. She moves into his home and gradually develops genuine feelings, even attempting to marry him in the manga (with Sun's eventual acceptance). Lunar commands a personal army of Isono Junior High boys, constantly clashing with Sun's guards. She speaks in the plural form and announces herself with a distinctive "hohoho" laugh. Like most mermaids, she fears cats despite her regal demeanor.
Lunar's Papa (ルナパパ, Runa-Papa)
Voiced by: Tesshō Genda (Japanese); J. Michael Tatum (English)
President Edomae leads the construction-oriented Edomae Group as Lunar's imposing father. Clad in a black skintight suit, this silent figure parodies the Terminator, complete with metallic body sounds and iconic film references like a thumbs-up "I'll be back" delivery. Though intimidating, he demonstrates quiet devotion to Lunar, supporting her relationship with Nagasumi more openly than Gozaburo does with Sun. His extreme wealth funds extravagant gestures like a $10 billion film project. In a recurring gag, he infiltrates Nagasumi's school disguised as a female student to monitor Lunar, ultimately revealing unexpected laser eye capabilities. His character theme parodies the Terminator 2: Judgment Day score.
Amano Sagami (相模 天王, Sagami Amano)
Lunar's mother, formerly known as Edomae before her divorce, was believed to have abandoned her family when Lunar was five. In reality, she served a ten-year prison sentence for intentionally running over her neglectful husband with a car. She shares Lunar's dramatic personality traits, recognizing their similarity when entering her passionate "mode". Her influence shaped Lunar's development - the childhood "war songs" she taught fostered Lunar's competitive spirit with Sun, while her absence indirectly motivated Lunar's idol career (partly hoping her father would see her on television). Her criminal past and flamboyant temperament create an unconventional but understanding bond with her daughter.

=== Other characters ===
Mawari Zenigata (銭形 巡, Zenigata Mawari)
Voiced by: Rika Morinaga (Japanese); Caitlin Glass (English)
Mawari, Nagasumi's childhood friend and police chief's daughter, harbors a crush on him while sternly policing his behavior. Aspiring to become a police chief like her father, her peacekeeping efforts are accompanied by a symbolic whistle sound. Her name references Zenigata Heiji and the Japanese term "Omawari-san" (police officer). As leader of Isono Junior High's Public Morals Committee, she commands the school's largest faction, rivaling both Sun and Lunar's groups. Though perceptive enough to nearly uncover Sun's mermaid identity, Nagasumi consistently intervenes. She frequently delivers her signature line: "Do you want Mawari to teach you the rules of society?" (巡が社会の常識(ルール)教えてあげようか, Mawari ga Shakai no Rūru oshiteageyō ka).
Hideyoshi Sarutobi (猿飛 秀吉, Sarutobi Hideyoshi)
Voiced by: Masashi Yabe (Japanese); Anthony Bowling (English)
Hideyoshi Sarutobi, nicknamed "Saru" (meaning monkey), is Nagasumi's perverted friend whose name references Sarutobi Sasuke and Toyotomi Hideyoshi. Initially befriending Kai Mikawa for money, he genuinely grows to care for him, becoming his loyal protector - often appearing suddenly like his ninja namesake. He periodically adopts a bearded sage persona ("Saru Roshi"), parodying Dragon Balls Master Roshi to dispense lewd advice. This "Pervy Hermit" alter ego reinforces his comedic role while maintaining his monkey-like characteristics, creating a humorous contrast with his occasional moments of genuine loyalty and friendship.
Class Rep (委員長, Iinchō)
Voiced by: Noriko Rikimaru (Japanese); Kate Bristol (English)
The Class Rep is Mawari's meek, bespectacled friend whose real name (later revealed as Iina Chiyo) remains unknown to her classmates. Despite her unassuming nature, she harbors strong feelings for Nagasumi, which she attempts to confess through a letter—only to accidentally declare her love to Sun instead. This triggers her alternate persona, the "Last Amazoness", a bold, girl-loving warrior who emerges when she seeks confidence or attention. Armed with the gender-reversing bow "Gender-X", she actively confronts troublemakers. She occasionally partners with Maki, whom she mistakes for a fairy, and longs for others to discover her true identity.
Kai Mikawa (三河 海, Mikawa Kai)
Voiced by: Daisuke Ono (Japanese); Eric Vale (English)
Kai Mikawa, the fourteen-year-old heir to the Mikawa Corporation, aggressively competes with Nagasumi for Sun's affection, often employing extreme methods like launching him to the moon via corporate satellites. As a killer whale mermaid, he transforms completely into an orca when wet, unlike Sun and Lunar's partial transformations. His agoraphobia forces him to travel in submarines and wear an astronaut suit outdoors, offering bribes when deprived of these protections. His name references Mikawa Bay and Neptune (海王星, kaiōsei). Leader of Sun's bodyguards, he wields wealth and status manipulatively, dressed typically in a navy uniform with katana. Like most merfolk, he fears cats (ailurophobia).
Akeno Shiranui (不知火 明乃 明星, Shiranui Akeno Myōjō)
Voiced by: Eri Kitamura (Japanese); Trina Nishimura (English)
Akeno serves as a "mermaid examiner", tasked with deporting merfolk who fail to blend in as humans. Unlike others, she can briefly suppress her transformation when wet through rigorous training. Initially hostile toward the protagonists, she gradually develops compassion, recognizing her knightly duty was manipulated by the final antagonist. Her name references the Shiranui Sea and Venus (明けの明星, ake no myōjyō; Venus in the eastern morning sky). She later discovers Masa is her long-lost brother after recognizing his pre-perm appearance, leading to a violent confrontation before reconciling. Akeno harbors a fear of ghosts and hinted feelings for Nagasumi.
Yoshiuo Minamoto
Voiced by: Daisuke Namikawa (Japanese); Chris Patton (English)
A self-proclaimed "mermaid noble" who secretly abducts girls from his parties. Employing Akeno to separate Nagasumi and Sun, he pursues Sun solely for her physical attractiveness despite his crude, punk-like speech patterns. His true form reveals a grotesque, overweight catfish—a shocking contrast to his aristocratic persona that amuses even his followers. Accompanied by three giant carnivorous eels, his defeat exposes both his hypocrisy and repulsive nature, undermining his claims of nobility. The character serves as a darkly comedic critique of superficial obsession and false prestige.
Satori Sarutobi (猿飛 悟, Sarutobi Satori)
Voiced by: Tomoko Kaneda
Saru's younger sister develops feelings for Nagasumi after he saves her from danger. She affectionately nicknames him "Nagasumi Willis", referencing the action hero parody "Bunta Willis" (combining Bruce Willis and Bunta Sugawara). Her admiration reflects both gratitude and youthful infatuation.
Saturn (サーたん, Sātan)
Voiced by: Ayumi Tsunematsu
Saturn, Sun's childhood friend, is a seaweed-based creature whose prehensile hair can cling to surfaces and ensnare objects or opponents. Dehydration severely weakens her. She later becomes an English teacher at Sun's school. Her hair often unintentionally collects aquatic debris, from fish to trash, demonstrating both her comic and combat potential.
Tennouzan (天王山, Tennōzan)
Tennouzan, a school delinquent leading a group of bullies, first appears harassing Mawari before being defeated by the Class President's "Last Amazoness" persona. Using Saturn's "Gender X" bow, she transforms them all into females. His name relates to Uranus (天王星, Tennōsei) while also referencing decisive battles in Japanese culture.
Yuhiteru Suruga (駿河 由比輝, Suruga Yuhiteru)
Known as Jupiter, a Weapon Attack Team member and school executive officer, is Akeno's close companion. Akeno affectionately calls her "Onee-sama", reflecting their bond. Jupiter harbors romantic feelings for Akeno, adding depth to their relationship while maintaining her professional role within the school's disciplinary structure.
Fuki (蕗)
Maki's younger sister. She employs a fuki leaf as her weapon instead of traditional shells. Her ice-based attacks can freeze targets solid. Serving as Maruko's bodyguard, she combines youthful appearance with formidable combat skills, creating an effective defensive presence.
Maruko Okhotsk (緒呆突 丸子, Ohōtsuku Maruko)
A childhood friend of Sun who dresses as a nun, she possesses voice-based mind control abilities that neutralize other mermaids' songs. Initially seeking to kill Nagasumi for allegedly forcing Sun into marriage, she reconciles after he helps treat her life-threatening internal bleeding. Her abilities and religious aesthetic create a distinctive presence among Sun's allies.

== Media ==
=== Manga ===
Written and illustrated by Tahiko Kimura, My Bride Is a Mermaid was serialized in Square Enix's shōnen manga magazine Monthly Gangan Wing from July 26, 2002, (Note: It started in the magazine's September 2002 issue, released on July 26 of that same year.) to February 26, 2008. (Note: Published until the magazine's April 2008 issue, released on February 26 of that same year.) The series later moved to the publisher's Monthly Gangan Joker, where it was published from May 22 to November 22, 2010. (Note: Published from the June to December 2010 issues, released on May 22 and November 22 of that same year, respectively.) Square Enix collected its chapters in 16 tankōbon volumes.

==== Volumes ====
No.	Release date	ISBN
1	February 27, 2003	978-4-7575-0880-4
2	July 26, 2003	978-4-7575-0986-3
3	November 27, 2003	978-4-7575-1073-9
4	April 27, 2004	978-4-7575-1189-7
5	August 27, 2004	978-4-7575-1257-3
6	December 27, 2004	978-4-7575-1341-9
7	April 27, 2005	978-4-7575-1417-1
8	September 27, 2005	978-4-7575-1532-1
9	March 27, 2006	978-4-7575-1648-9
10	July 27, 2006	978-4-7575-1730-1
11	November 27, 2006	978-4-7575-1818-6
12	March 27, 2007	978-4-7575-1976-3
13	July 27, 2007	978-4-7575-2058-5
14	March 27, 2008	978-4-7575-2247-3
15	February 22, 2011	978-4-7575-3141-3
16	February 22, 2011	978-4-7575-3142-0

=== Anime ===
The anime TV series adaptation directed by Seiji Kishi, written by Makoto Uezu and produced by Gonzo and AIC aired in Japan on TV Tokyo between April 1 and September 30, 2007, containing 26 episodes. Episode 17 of the anime adaptation scheduled for broadcast on AT-X on September 3, 2007, was canceled due to concerns of copyright infringement. Some of the characters who appear in that episode are believed to closely resemble characters from other works. The series was licensed by Funimation and was released under the title My Bride Is a Mermaid!. The first of two parts was released on July 20, 2010. Three pieces of theme music were used for the anime: one opening theme, and two ending themes. The opening theme is "Romantic Summer" by Sun (Haruko Momoi) & Lunar (Sakura Nogawa), which was written, composed, and arranged by Momoi. In the opening video, the characters dancing behind Sun change depending on the episode whether it is dedicated or related to them (for example, Nagasumi dancing with the Seto's Special Squad brothers). The first ending theme, used for episodes one through thirteen, and then again for episode twenty-six, is "Asu e no Hikari" (明日への光) by Asuka Hinoi, which was written, composed, and arranged by Yugo Sasakura. In the video, the image in the ending changes slightly between each episode as new characters are introduced in the anime. The second ending theme, used for episodes fourteen through twenty-five, is "Dan Dan Dan" by Sun (Haruko Momoi) & Lunar (Sakura Nogawa), which was written by Gorō Matsui, and composed and arranged by Shūhei Naruse. In the video, the characters' animations change depending on the circumstances they undergo during the episode (for example, the Class President transforming into "Yes! Amazoness!").

=== Original video animation ===
An original video animation episode entitled Jin (仁) was released on November 28, 2008, along with the OVA ending theme single, "Mirai e Go" (未来へGo) by Dekabancho. The OVA's opening theme single, "Zettai Otome" (絶対乙女) by Sun&Lunar, was released on October 29, 2008. A second OVA entitled Gi (義) was released on January 30, 2009, along with its ending theme, "Kakehashi" (梯 -かけはし-) by Sun&Lunar. The opening theme for this OVA, "Tenshi Ranman Love Power" (天使爛漫 Love Power) by Haruko Momoi, Sakura Nogawa, Rika Morinaga, Eri Kitamura, was released on December 24, 2008.
