= Rozen Maiden =

Japanese manga series and its adaptations

- The shinsōban edition of Rozen Maiden volume five featuring Shinku

ローゼンメイデン (Rōzen Meiden)
- Genre: Gothic fantasy; Supernatural
- Manga
- Written by: Peach-Pit
- Published by: Gentosha
- English publisher: AUS: Madman Entertainment; NA: Tokyopop (expired); Seven Seas Entertainment (current)
- Magazine: Monthly Comic Birz
- Original run: August 12, 2002 – May 30, 2007
- Volumes: 8
- Anime television series
- Directed by: Kou Matsuo
- Written by: Jukki Hanada
- Music by: Shinkichi Mitsumune
- Studio: Nomad
- Licensed by: NA: Sentai Filmworks; UK: MVM Films
- Original network: TBS, BS-i, RKB, MBS, Kids Station
- English network: NA: Anime Network
- Original run: October 7, 2004 – December 23, 2004
- Episodes: 12
- Anime television series

Rozen Maiden: Träumend
- Directed by: Kou Matsuo
- Written by: Jukki Hanada
- Music by: Shinkichi Mitsumune
- Studio: Nomad
- Licensed by: NA: Sentai Filmworks; UK: MVM Films
- Original network: TBS, BS-i, CBC, MBS, Kids Station
- English network: NA: Anime Network
- Original run: October 20, 2005 – January 26, 2006
- Episodes: 12
- Anime television series

Rozen Maiden: Ouvertüre
- Directed by: Kou Matsuo
- Written by: Jukki Hanada
- Music by: Shinkichi Mitsumune
- Studio: Nomad
- Licensed by: NA: Sentai Filmworks; UK: MVM Films
- Original network: TBS
- English network: NA: Anime Network
- Original run: December 22, 2006 – December 23, 2006
- Episodes: 2
- Manga

Rozen Maiden^{KK}
- Written by: Peach-Pit
- Published by: Shueisha
- English publisher: NA: Seven Seas Entertainment
- Magazine: Weekly Young Jump
- Original run: April 17, 2008 – January 23, 2014
- Volumes: 10
- Manga

Rozen Maiden: Dolls Talk
- Written by: Peach-Pit
- Illustrated by: Haru Karuki
- Published by: Shueisha
- Magazine: Ribon
- Original run: December 1, 2011 – April 3, 2014
- Volumes: 3
- Anime television series

Rozen Maiden: Zurückspulen
- Directed by: Shinichi Omata (Note: Credited under the pseudonym Mamoru Hatakeyama.)
- Written by: Tomomi Mochizuki
- Music by: Shinkichi Mitsumune
- Studio: Studio Deen
- Licensed by: NA: Sentai Filmworks; UK: MVM Entertainment
- Original network: TBS, MBS, CBC, BS-TBS
- English network: NA: Anime Network
- Original run: July 4, 2013 – September 26, 2013
- Episodes: 13
- Manga

Rozen Maiden 0 -Zero-
- Written by: Peach-Pit
- Published by: Shueisha
- Magazine: Ultra Jump
- Original run: February 19, 2016 – March 19, 2019
- Volumes: 4
- Related media
- Rozen Maiden discography
- icon

Rozen Maiden (Note: Japanese: ローゼンメイデン, Hepburn: Rōzen Meiden) is a Japanese manga series written and illustrated by Peach-Pit. It was serialized in Monthly Comic Birz between the September 2002 and July 2007 issues. The individual chapters were collected and released into eight tankōbon volumes by Gentosha. The eight volumes were localized to North America by Tokyopop between March 2003 and June 2007. The story follows Jun Sakurada, a middle school student who withdrew from society after suffering persecutions from his classmates. Following his withdrawal, he is chosen to become the master to a Rozen Maiden named Shinku. Rozen Maidens are seven sentient porcelain dolls who compete against each other to become a perfect doll dubbed as Alice.

Rozen Maiden received a sequel under the series' katakana title. It was serialized in Shueisha's Weekly Young Jump between April 2008 and January 2014. Rozen Maiden has spun off anthology manga and novel stories, art books, and four anime series; the four anime series are titled Rozen Maiden, Rozen Maiden: Träumend, Rozen Maiden: Ouvertüre, and Rozen Maiden: Zurückspulen. Tokyo Broadcasting System were the producers for the anime with Nomad as the animation studio for the first three series and Studio Deen for Zurückspulen. The anime adaptions resulted in several audio disc releases and three video games.

In 2007, Geneon Entertainment USA licensed the first two anime series for North American release and had later signed Funimation on as a distributor, after shutting down in September 2007. In 2011, Sentai Filmworks acquired both seasons as well as the third series; they made the three series available for streaming on Anime Network. Crunchyroll later acquired streaming rights to the first two series. For the fourth series, Sentai Filmworks had acquired the license for digital and home video release, while Crunchyroll acquired streaming rights.

Tokyopop's volumes of Rozen Maiden have appeared on ICv2's monthly top one-hundred selling graphic novels. Reviews towards the manga were generally positive with reviewers praising balance in drama and comedy. Reception of the anime adaptations was mostly positive from reviewers, although Ouvertüre received negative reviews.

== Plot ==
In the 20th century, a legendary doll maker named Rozen created seven bisque dolls which were powered and given sentience with a gem called Rosa Mystica.^{Phase 2} Since then, Rozen sent the dolls away to find masters and to battle among themselves to gather each other's Rosa Mysticas; this competition is referred to as the Alice Game. When a doll obtains all seven, they are to become a perfect doll dubbed as Alice and will be reunited with Rozen.^{Phase 5} By order of creation, the seven Rozen Maidens are named Suigintou, Kanaria, Suiseiseki, Souseiseki, Shinku, Hinaichigo, and Kirakisho.

Rozen Maiden follows Jun Sakurada, a middle school student who has withdrawn from society after suffering persecution by his classmates. He is chosen to become Shinku's master and joins the Alice Game along with the other dolls masters.^{Prologue 2} As the series progresses, Jun also becomes the master to Hinaichigo and Suiseiseki. After Souseiseki's Rosa Mystica is taken by Suigintou, Jun's Rozen Maidens resolve to revive her and to end the Alice Game peacefully;^{Phase 21} they later befriend Kanaria who shares their sentiments. However, the group is attacked by Kirakisho who absorbs Hinaichigo and traps Shinku and Suiseiseki in the N-field, a plane of consciousness which connects the universe. Rozen Maiden concludes with Jun preparing to enter the N-field to save the dolls.^{Phase 43}

Rozen Maiden's plot is continued in the sequel serialization which uses the katakana title of the series.^{KK} Inside the N-field, Jun is forced into hiding by Kirakisho and contacts an adult version of himself from an alternate world.^{Tale 1} The adult Jun is able to free Shinku and unite the Rozen Maidens to defeat Kirakisho.^{Tale 25} Kirakisho returns and successfully captures all of the Rozen Maidens' masters. The Rozen Maidens pursue her, eventually resulting in the defeat of most of them, except Shinku and Kirakisho. Shinku's sympathy towards Kirakisho's loneliness convinces the latter to surrender her Rosa Mystica. With all seven gathered, Shinku becomes Alice.^{Tale 65} Using her new powers, Shinku revives her sisters and is put into a coma in return.^{Tale 66}

== Characters ==
=== Masters ===
Jun Sakurada (桜田 ジュン, Sakurada Jun)
Voiced by: Asami Sanada, Ryōta Ōsaka (adult) (Japanese); Mona Marshall, Shannon Emerick (Zurückspulen), Corey Hartzog (adult) (English)
A middle school student who withdrew from society after he was outed and bullied by his school peers for being a dress designer.^{Phase 27} Since then, he becomes irritated whenever something related to school is brought up and sinks into a depression when pressured on the topic. His interactions with the Rozen Maidens and their masters changes his outlook on life and he works up the courage to return to society as well as school. He has an older sister named Nori Sakurada (Note: 桜田 のり, Sakurada Nori), a high school student who serves as his caretaker while both of their parents work overseas.
In an alternate world without Rozen Maidens, Jun eventually returns to society and is a friendless university student who works at a bookstore.^{Tale 1} His interactions with Shinku gives him the opportunity to befriend his co-worker, Saitou (Note: 斉藤, Saitō), which leads him to join a theatrics club. At the end of the series, he becomes Kirakisho's master.^{Tale 66}
Megu Kakizaki (Note: 柿崎 めぐ, Kakizaki Megu)
Voiced by: Shiho Kawaragi (Japanese); Erika Weinstein, Emily Neves (Zurückspulen) (English)
A sickly girl with a cynical personality.^{Phase 23} Megu sees Suigintou as an angel of death who will end her suffering. She practically lives in a hospital room due to a congenital heart condition that she has suffered from since birth and is often under constant care and supervision from doctors and nurses.
Mitsu Kusabue (Note: 草笛 みつ, Kusabue Mitsu)
Voiced by: Akiko Kawase (Japanese); Philece Sampler (English)
A doll clothing designer. Mitsu greatly adores the Rozen Maidens which scares the dolls.
Kazuha Yuibishi (Note: 結菱 一葉, Yuibishi Kazuha)
A rich man who is haunted by his younger twin brother's death. Kazuha disproved of his brother's marriage forcing the latter elope and drown in a ferry accident; as such, he intends to use Souseiseki to make his brother's widow suffer. After Souseiseki reveals Kazuha's hatred comes from grief she uses her abilities to leave him at peace.^{Phase 20}
Motoharu Shibasaki (柴崎 元治, Shibasaki Motoharu)
Voiced by: Ikuo Nishikawa (Japanese); Kevin Seymour (English)
Souseiseki's master in the anime by Nomad, who substitutes her for his dead son though he overcomes his grief afterwards.
Tomoe Kashiwaba (Note: 柏葉 巴, Kashiwaba Tomoe)
Voiced by: Masayo Kurata (Japanese); Dorothy Elias-Fahn, Juliet Simmons (Zurückspulen) (English)
One of Jun's classmates who delivers his school work during his withdrawal. When Hinaichigo's naivety endangers Tomoe's life, Shinku defeats Hinaichigo in the Alice Game and has her become a servant instead of taking her Rosa Mystica.^{Phase 6} She is highly skilled at kendo which has learned from her father as a young child, and is a member of her school's kendo club to which she is often seen caring around her sword in a duffle bag around her shoulder.

=== Rozen Maidens ===
The Rozen Maidens with Shinku in the center. From top going clockwise: Suigintou, Kanaria, Suiseiseki, Souseiseki, Hinaichigo, Kirakisho.

A legendary doll maker named Rozen (ローゼン, Rōzen) wanted to create a perfect doll dubbed as Alice. His attempts resulted in seven sentient bisque dolls which became known as Rozen Maidens.^{Phase 13} The dolls' sentient nature are powered by a magical gem called Rosa Mystica. To become Alice, a Rozen Maiden must gather all seven Rosa Mysticas; this contest is referred to as the Alice Game. Each Rozen Maiden has a production order, their own personal suitcase, and are accompanied by an artificial spirit which serves the doll. Rozen Maidens rely on a contract with a human master to supply themselves with power for battle.^{Phase 6} Since then, Rozen has forgone a physical body and lives within the N-field, waiting for Alice.^{Tale 62}

Suigintou (水銀燈, Suigintō)
Voiced by: Rie Tanaka (Japanese); Karen Strassman, Jessica Calvello (Zurückspulen) (English)
The first Rozen Maiden and is accompanied by the artificial spirit Meimei (Note: メイメイ, Meimei). She is Gothic-themed and the most ambitious of her sisters and wishes to become Alice to earn Rozen's love.^{Phase 29} Suigintou possesses black wings which she uses for mobility and offensive purposes. Her master is Megu.
Kanaria (金糸雀)
Voiced by: Yumi Shimura (2005-2014), Akari Kageyama (2018-present, collaboration only) (Japanese); Cristina Vee, Monica Rial (Zurückspulen) (English)
The second Rozen Maiden and is accompanied by the artificial spirit Pizzicato (Note: ピチカート, Pichikāto). She is sociable, energetic, eccentric and habitually ends her sentences with lit. 'Possibly' (かしら〜, Kashira). She was initially a loyal participant of the Alice game but is convinced for a peaceful lifestyle instead. For battle, she plays her violin and manipulates the sound waves to cause destruction. Her master is Mitsu.
Suiseiseki (翠星石)
Voiced by: Natsuko Kuwatani (Japanese); Rebecca Forstadt, Brittney Karbowski (Zurückspulen) (English)
The third Rozen Maiden and is accompanied by the artificial spirit Sui Dream (Note: スィドリーム, Sui Dorīmu). She is a tsundere; she openly insults others but does care about them. Suiseiseki speaks with the copula desu and always speaks in third person. She has no intention of participating in the Alice Game and only wishes to live happily with her younger twin sister, Souseiseki.^{Phase 25} Suiseiseki's ability is to supply nourishment to souls and memories and is able to summon plants for offensive purposes with her watering can.^{Phase 19} Jun becomes her master during the events of the series.^{Phase 17}
Souseiseki (蒼星石, Sōseiseki)
Voiced by: Rika Morinaga (Japanese); Julie Ann Taylor, Kara Greenberg (Zurückspulen) (English)
The fourth Rozen Maiden and is accompanied by the artificial spirit Lempicka (Note: レンピカ, Renpika). She speaks in as masculine manner and has a strong sense of duty towards her master and role as a Rozen Maiden. Souseiseki's ability is to cut souls and memories with her scissors.^{Phase 19} Her master is Kazuha in the manga and Motoharu in the anime. During the series, Souseiseki's Rosa Mystica is taken by Suigintou and her body by Kirakisho. Souseiseki is later, revived and becomes Jun's Rozen Maiden.^{Tale 16} Afterwards, Souseiseki willingly gives Suigintou her Rosa Mystica.^{Tale 50}
Shinku (真紅)
Voiced by: Miyuki Sawashiro (Japanese); Mela Lee, Luci Christian (Zurückspulen) (English)
The fifth Rozen Maiden and is accompanied by the artificial spirit Hollie (Note: ホーリエ, Hōrie). She has a southern belle personality and treats Jun as her servant. Shinku treats regular dolls as if they are alive, and is an avid fan of the fictional puppet show Detective Kun Kun (Note: くんくん探偵, Kunkun Tantei).^{Phase 14} Shinku wishes to complete the Alice Game without killing her siblings.^{Phase 6} For battles, she is able to create and control rose petals.
Hinaichigo (雛苺)
Voiced by: Sakura Nogawa (Japanese); Sherry Lynn, Hilary Haag (Zurückspulen) (English)
The sixth Rozen Maiden and is accompanied by the artificial spirit Berrybell (Note: ベリーベル, Berīberu). She has a childlike personality and dislikes being alone very much.^{Phase 30} She often ends her sentences with "na no" (なの〜) and occasionally speaks in French. For battle, Hinaichigo is able to summon and control strawberry vines.^{Phase 8} Her master was Tomoe. During the series, Hinaichigo is absorbed by Kirakisho and gives her Rosa Mystica to Shinku. ^{Phase 35}
Kirakisho (雪華綺晶, Kirakishō)
Voiced by: Chiemi Chiba (Japanese); Carli Mosier (English)
The seventh and final Rozen Maiden is accompanied by the artificial spirit Rosary (Note: ロザリオ, Rosário). She was created without a physical body as Rozen tested whether physical limitations prevented him from creating Alice.^{Phase 34} Her ability allows her to materialize illusions. Because she can not exist outside the N-Field, her main goal is to capture the Rozen Maiden's masters to ease her loneliness. After her defeat, Kirakisho uses her illusions to create a middle school student named Kaito Toriumi (Note: 鳥海皆人, Toriumi Kaito) to replace Rozen and to craft imitated Rozen Maidens to be her sister. Following her second defeat, Kirakisho is touched by Shinku’s love and surrenders her Rosa Mystica.^{Tale 65} She was later revived with a physical body and is in possession of the adult Jun.^{Tale 66}

=== Other characters ===
Nori Sakurada (桜田 のり, Sakurada Nori)
Voiced by: Noriko Rikimaru (Japanese); Minx Lee (English)
Jun's older sister who has given up a lot of school activities to care for him while their parents are working overseas. She's a student at a nearby high school and is on her school's lacrosse team.
Laplace's Demon (ラプラスの魔, Rapurasu no Ma)
Voiced by: Kyousei Tsukui, Satoshi Mikami (Zurückspulen) (Japanese); Keith Silverstein, David Wald (Zurückspulen) (English)
A humanoid with a rabbit's head who dwells in the N-field.^{Phase 5} He is the referee to the Alice Game, possibly omniscient, and often assists the protagonists through riddles or as a directional guide.
Bara-Suishou (薔薇水晶, Barasuishō) and Enju (槐)
Voiced by: Saori Gotō (Bara-Suishou), Daisuke Ono (Japanese); Tara Platt (Bara-Suishou), Jason C. Miller (Enju) (English)
Bara-Suishou and Enju are characters who appear in the Rozen Maiden: Träumend anime and audio drama. Enju is Rozen's apprentice and the creator of Bara-Suishou, an imitation of a Rozen Maiden. Enju plots a battle between Bara-Suishou and the Rozen Maidens in order to prove his superiority over Rozen. Once Bara-Suishou gathered six Rosa Mysticas, her body overloads, killing her and Enju.

== Original work ==
Rozen Maiden is authored by Peach-Pit and was serialized in Gentosha's Monthly Comic Birz between issues September 2002 and July 2007. Gentosha compiled the individual chapters into eight tankōbon volumes released between March 2003 and June 2007. These volumes were later recompiled into seven shinsōban volumes by Shueisha and released between April 2008 and November 2008. Tokyopop localized Gentosha's tankōbon volumes in English for North America and released them between May 2006 and May 2008. In 2011, Tokyopop's North American division was closed down and their licenses to manga franchises were revoked. Tokyopop's translations were distributed in Australasia by Madman Entertainment. The series has also been localized in other languages such as Chinese, French, and Italian.

In March 2008, Peach-Pit published a one-shot titled Shōjo no Tsukurikata (少女のつくり方, lit. 'How to Make a Girl') in the 16th issue of Weekly Young Jump. In the following issue, a serialization for Rozen Maiden was announced. Serialization began in Weekly Young Jump's 20th issue in April 2008 until its conclusion in the issue 8 in January 2014. The second series was published under the katakana for Rozen Maiden^{KK}, and is a sequel to the first series. The series has been localized in other languages such as Italian, French, and Chinese. Peach-Pit also published a one-shot in the October 2013 issue of Ribon which focuses on the Rozen Maidens' past.

In June 2024, Seven Seas Entertainment announced that they licensed the series and the sequel manga; they released them in seven omnibus collector's edition volumes.

== Rozen Maiden Zero ==
A prequel to the original series titled Rozen Maiden 0 -Zero- (Note: ローゼンメイデン０－ゼロー, Rōzen Meiden 0 -Zero-) was authored by Peach Pit and published in Ultra Jump magazine from 2016 to 2019.

Rozen Maiden Zero takes place in 1920s Japan and is focused on the twin dolls, Suiseiseki and Souseiseki forming a detective agency with their masters, Kiku (Note: 菊, Kiku) and Hana (Note: 華, Hana) who themselves are sisters from rural Japan reuniting in Tokyo. The central plot of the series revolves around the unfinished Zeroth Doll, Ginka (Note: 銀華, Ginka) whose dreams are threatening to cause an earthquake which would do tremendous damage to Tokyo including the tower Yōunkaku (based on the real tower Ryōunkaku) where Hana works as an elevator girl.

== Media adaptations ==
=== Anime ===
Rozen Maiden was adapted into an anime, produced by Tokyo Broadcasting System and animated by Nomad. It premiered on Tokyo Broadcasting System and was broadcast between October 7, 2004, and December 23, 2004. It was also broadcast on RKB Mainichi Broadcasting, Mainichi Broadcasting System, BS-i, and Kids Station. Pony Canyon released the series in six DVDs and a box set. Geneon USA localized the series for North America and released it on three DVD volumes. In 2008, Funimation gained distribution rights from Geneon and released a box collection of the series. Sentai Filmworks licensed the series in 2011 and included it in the Rozen Maiden: The Complete Collection DVD box release. Sentai also made the series available for streaming on networks such as Anime Network and Crunchyroll. MVM Films distributed the series in the United Kingdom.

The second series, Rozen Maiden: Träumend (ローゼンメイデン トロイメント, Rōzen Meiden Toroimento), was first announced in March 2005 and is a continuation of the previous series. It premiered on Tokyo Broadcasting System and was broadcast between October 20, 2005, and January 26, 2006. It was also broadcast on Mainichi Broadcasting System, Chubu-Nippon Broadcasting, BS-i, and Kids Station. Pony Canyon released the series in six DVDs and a box set. As for the first series, Geneon USA localized the series for North America and released the first volume before closing all DVD distribution in September 2007. Following Funimation acquiring the distribution rights, Funimation released the series in three DVD volumes and later, released a box set for the series. Funimation later released a box set which included the first series and Träumend on May 4, 2010. Sentai Filmworks later licensed the series in 2011 and included it in the Rozen Maiden: The Complete Collection DVD box release. Sentai made the series available for streaming on networks such as Anime Network and Crunchyroll. MVM Films distributed the series in the United Kingdom.

The third series is Rozen Maiden: Ouvertüre (ローゼンメイデン オーベルテューレ, Rōzen Meiden Ōberutyūre), a two-episode series which explores Suigintou's origins. It premiered on Tokyo Broadcasting System and was broadcast on December 22 and 23, 2006. The episodes were released on DVD on February 21, 2007. Sentai Filmworks licensed the series in 2011 and included it in the Rozen Maiden: The Complete Collection DVD box release and as a stand-alone DVD. Sentai made the series available for streaming on Anime Network. MVM Films distributed the series in the United Kingdom.

The fourth series is Rozen Maiden: Zurückspulen, referred only as Rozen Maiden^{KK} in Japan, was announced in November 2012 in Weekly Young Jump. It is an adaption of the second manga series. Unlike the previous three anime series, it is animated by Studio Deen. It premiered on Tokyo Broadcasting System and was broadcast between July 4, 2013, and September 26, 2013. It was also broadcast on Mainichi Broadcasting System, Chubu-Nippon Broadcasting, and BS-TBS. Crunchyroll licensed the series for simulcast followed by Sentai Filmworks who made it available for simulcast on Anime Network and released the series on home video in October 2014.

=== Discography ===
The four anime series resulted in several theme music, radio dramas, soundtracks, and two radio programs. The first radio program is Rozen Maiden Web Radio: Rose Scented Garden Party (Note: ローゼンメイデン・ウェブラジオ 薔薇の香りのGarden Party, Rōzen Meiden Uebu Rajio Bara no Kaori no Garden Pātī), an internet radio program that aired on Lantis Web Radio between May 13, 2005, and September 30, 2005. It is hosted by Miyuki Sawashiro and Asami Sanada, the voice of Shinku and Jun respectively. The second is Suigintou's Night of Ennui (Note: 水銀燈の今宵もアンニュ～イ, Suigintou no Koyoi mo Ennūi), a live radio hosted by Sugintou's voice actress Rie Tanaka during Tokyo Broadcasting System's Anime Festa 2006. Due to positive reception, it was continued through additional CD releases. The soundtracks from the Rozen Maiden video games have also been released. Prior to the anime's creation, a radio drama was produced by Frontier Works who used their own voice cast.

=== Video games ===
Three video games have been produced for the series. Rozen Maiden: Duellwalzer (Note: ローゼンメイデン ドゥエルヴァルツァ, Rōzen Meiden Dueruvarutsa) is a PlayStation 2 video game developed by Taito and released on April 27, 2006. Its soundtrack, Rozen Maiden Beilege Disk, was included with the game's preorder. The game re-released under the label "Taito Best" on March 25, 2007. Taito released a second game for the PlayStation 2 titled Rozen Maiden: Gebetgarten (Note: ローゼンメイデン ゲベートガルテン, Rōzen Meiden Gebētogaruten) on March 22, 2007. Its soundtrack, Rozen Maiden Beilege Disk 2, was included with the preorder. The third video game is Rozen Maiden: Wechseln Sie Welt Ab (Note: ローゼンメイデン ヴェヘゼルン ジー ヴェルト アップ, Rōzen Meiden Vehezerun Jī Veruto Appu) by 5pb. for the PlayStation 3 and PlayStation Vita; it was released on January 30, 2014.

=== Anthology manga and novels ===
Several manga spin-offs were created. An anthology tankōbon entitled Rozen Maiden: Entr'acte (Note: ローゼンメイデン アントラクト, Rōzen Meiden Antorakuto) was published by Getonsha in 2005. Two anthology series were created based on the second series. The first is Rozen Maiden Dolls Talk^{KK} by Haru Karuki. It was serialized in Ribon between the January 2012 to April 2014 issues. The second is Maite wa Ikenai Rozen Maiden (まいてはいけないローゼンメイデン, lit. "The Rozen Maiden That Should Not Have Existed") by Choboraunyopomi. It began serialization in Miracle Jump issue 12, which was released on December 27, 2012.

Two anthology novel series have been written. Chabō Higurashi wrote the anthology novel series Die Romane der Rozen Maiden (Note: ディ ロマーネ ディア ローゼンメイデン, Di Romāne Dia Rōzen Meiden) which consisted of two novels subtitled Schwarzer Wind (Note: シュヴァルツェァ ヴィンド, Shuvarutsea Vindo) and Kalkgrün Augen. Himiro Hisasa wrote the second novel series, Rozen Maiden^{KK}, which consisted of two novels subtitled Zwillinge (Note: ツヴィリンゲ, Tsuviringe) and Roth Schwarz (Note: ロートシュヴァルツ, Rōto Shuvuarutsu).

=== Other ===
The Rozen Maiden anime has been adapted into three film comic volumes by Gentosha. Two fan books based on the anime were also published: Rozen Maiden: Edel Rose (Note: ローゼンメイデン エーデルローゼ, Rōzen Meiden Ēderurōze) covers the anime Rozen Maiden and is published by Impress Group; Rozen Maiden: Träumend Nocturne (Note: ローゼンメイデン トロイメント ノクトゥルネ, Rōzen Meiden Toroimento Nokuturune) covers Rozen Maiden: Träumend and is published by Gentosha; Rozen Maiden Comic & Anime Official Guide Book (Note: ローゼンメイデン コミック＆アニメ公式ガイドBook, Rōzen Meiden Komikku & Anime Kōshiki Gaido Book) covers Rozen Maiden: Zurückspulen and is published by Shueisha. Four art books were also released: Rozen Maiden: Erinnerung published by SoftBank Creative, Rozen Maiden: Kunstwerk (Note: ローゼンメイデン クンストヴェルク, Rōzen Meiden Kunsutoveruku) by Ichijinsha, Peach-Pit Art book (Rozen Maiden) and Rozen Maiden Art Book: Rose Maiden (Note: ローゼンメイデン画集「薔薇乙女」, Rōzen Meiden Gashū: Bara Otome), both by Shueisha.

Many merchandise has been released based on the Rozen Maiden franchise such as dolls, clothing and accessories, and other miscellaneous items.

== Reception ==
Tokyopop's localized volumes appeared on ICv2's monthly top one-hundred selling graphic novels. The Rozen Maiden manga has received generally positive reviews. Anime News Network praised Peach-Pit's works as always being able to evoke excitement or laughter from its readers but was critical about Rozen Maiden's lack of plot and criticized how the dialogue or layout can be vague. Comic Book Bin wrote that while Rozen Maiden was not a splendid manga, its emphasis on psychology and emotion was something American comics should follow to expand their readership. Active Anime praised several aspects of the series: the combination of mystery, comedy, and cuteness with a balance of fantasy and drama; the visual aesthetics of the images and characters; and a broadness that extends towards teens and adults. Initially, Anime Land praised the balance between comedic daily life and the underlying dark side of the plot. In later volumes though, Anime Land criticized the story's pacing and the abrupt ending. In their review of the sequel, Anime Land wrote they were surprised by the dark tone and how the plot was confusing even with knowledge from the first series. Manga-News also praised the story's alteration between moments of peace and conflict but panned the latter volumes for being rushed and losing the story's complexity. In their review of the sequel, Manga-News praised the introduction for being interesting and accessible to new readers.

In 2005, Japanese television network TV Asahi conducted a "Top 100" online web poll and the Rozen Maiden anime adaptation placed 50th. In the subsequent year, Rozen Maiden: Träumend ranked 7th in a "Top 20" poll conducted by Japanese anime magazine Animage. Active Anime had several reviewers for the anime series Rozen Maiden and its sequel Rozen Maiden: Träumend. Christopher Seaman wrote several praises for the anime: the high quality visuals and the detail in the dolls' designs; the soundtrack which complements the visuals; and the story which he considered to be engaging, fast-paced, and comedic. Sandra Scholes described the series as a lavish production and that while it is battle oriented during fight scenes, it also offers emotional moments that cater to girls. Davey C. Jones commented the series is something Chobits fans would enjoy and that Rozen Maiden: Träumend's ending is not a "feel good" ending.

Mania initially expressed skepticism of the show's combination of Gothic Lolita, dolls, magic, and comedy but later calls it a successful experiment and praised the character interactions and the dolls' designs. In their Rozen Maiden: Träumend review, Mania praised the visuals and characters but criticized the unbalanced comic and dark comments and described the revelations and finale as rushed. Anime News Network's reviews for Rozen Maiden: Träumend were mixed. Carl Kimlinger criticized its reliance on familiar anime clichés, while Carlo Santos expressed dissatisfaction with the handling of darker plot elements, and took issue with dialogue and later story developments. The series also holds a “Very Good” median user rating on Anime News Network.

Reviews of Rozen Maiden: Ouvertüre were generally negative. UK Anime Network criticized the OVA for lacking a clear purpose and direction, describing it as unfocused and failing to provide meaningful resolution to its multiple storylines, though the sound and visual design were praised. THEM Anime Reviews similarly found little value in the prequel, criticizing its lack of new or meaningful background information, melodramatic storytelling, and inconsistencies with the series’ established premises, while also noting comparatively weaker music.

Anime News Network's reviews of Rozen Maiden: Zurückspulen were generally positive. Carl Kimlinger described the characterization of the adult Jun as a "highly believable mixture of bruised pride, desperate loneliness, and downtrodden numbness" and praised how relatable the character is compared to his younger self. He also praised the scripting for Jun's life and the scene where Jun's personality is being dissected by his boss as intelligently written. Bamboo Dong praised Zurückspulen's introduction for revitalizing the series. Both reviewers praised the art and dolls' designs and expressed concerns about the confusing plot. It holds a median user rating of "Good".

== Notes ==
- Prologue 1 & 2 are the first two chapters from the Rozen Maiden manga. Afterwards, chapters are referred to as Phases starting with Phase 1.
- Tales are what chapters from the sequel manga series are referred as. The sequel is published under the katakana for Rozen Maiden.
- The katakana for Rozen Maiden is ローゼンメイデン. KK denotes Rozen Maiden as being written in katakana instead of the English alphabet.

Japanese
