= Peach-Pit (manga artist duo) =

Manga artists from Japan

- Signature of the duo
- Native name: ピーチ・ピット
- Type: Manga studio
- Founder: Banri Sendo; Shibuko Ebara
- Headquarters: Japan

Peach-Pit (ピーチ・ピット, Pīchi Pitto) is a female manga artist duo in Japan, made up of Banri Sendo (千道 万里, Sendō Banri) and Shibuko Ebara (えばら 渋子, Ebara Shibuko). Their group name derives from the diner hangout Peach-Pit from the TV show Beverly Hills, 90210. Although both have similar styles, with some artwork it is possible to identify which artist drew it. Both are known for their bishōjo styled works.

The two of them grew up together and went to the same elementary school and have been best friends ever since. Both started as dōjinshi manga artists, but not as Peach-Pit. Then they were scouted by Dengeki Comic Gao!. In 2008, one of their manga, Shugo Chara!, was awarded the Kodansha Manga Award for best children's manga. Shugo Chara was also turned later into an anime television series.

== Critical reception ==
A review of Peach Pit's work states; "What sets Shugo Chara! above other manga aimed at a younger audience is the underlying message that the mangakas incorporated. In the manga, the main characters work hard to protect other children and never give up on their dreams." This is seen as an encouragement by the authors to "search out your potential, realize your dreams, and support the dreams of your friends is a powerful and positive topic. It can inspire people of any age, as shown in the story."

== Bibliography ==
- Prism Palette (プリズムパレット, Purizumuparetto) (2001)
- DearS (ディアーズ, Diāzu) (2002–2005)
- Rozen Maiden (ローゼンメイデン, Rōzen Meiden) (2002–2007, 2008–2014)
- Zombie-Loan (ゾンビローン, Zonbi Rōn) (2003–2011)
- Shugo Chara! (しゅごキャラ!, Shugo Kyara!) (2006–2025)
- Ōkami Kakushi (おおかみかくし) (2009) (Character designs)
- Shugo Chara! Encore! (しゅごキャラ!アンコール, Shugo Kyara! Ankōru) (2010)
- Kugiko-San (クギ子ちゃん, Kugiko-San) (2011)
- Kingyozaka Noboru (金魚坂上ル, Kingyozaka Noboru) (2012–2015)
- Wandering Wonder World (ワンダリングワンダーワールド, Wandaringu Wandaa Warudo) (2015-2017)
- Nishina Tesura wa Suiri shinai (二科てすらは推理しない) (2017)
- Nishina Tesura wa Mitsukaranai (二科てすらは見つからない) (2018)
- Sei Shōnagon to Mōshimasu (清少納言と申します) (2019–)
- Shugo Chara! Jewel Joker (しゅごキャラ！ ジュエルジョーカー) (2024–)
