= List of animated television series of 2003 =

A list of animated television series first aired in 2003.

Animated television series first aired in 2003
Title	Seasons	Episodes	Country	Year	Original Channel	Technique
Adventures of Chhota Birbal	1		India	2003	Cartoon Network	Traditional
The Adventures of Tenali Raman	1	26	India	2003	Cartoon Network	Traditional
Albert Asks... What is Life?	1	26	Germany	2003	KI.KA	Traditional
All Grown Up!	5	55	United States	2003–08	Nickelodeon	Traditional
Antje	1	26	Germany	2003	Das Erste	Traditional
The Aquaman & Friends Action Hour	1	7	United States	2003	Cartoon Network	Traditional
Auld Ones	2	26	Ireland	2003–07	RTÉ2	Flash
The Adventures of Little Brown Bear	1	52	France	2003	France 5	Traditional
Bobinogs	5	65	United Kingdom	2003–08	CBeebies	Flash
Bonus Stage	8	89	United States	2003–06	Toon Zone (2003–04), Keentoons (2004–06)	Flash
Boo!	2	104	United Kingdom	2003–06	CBeebies	CGI/Traditional
The Booo Krooo	1	6	United Kingdom	2003	Channel U	Flash
Bounty Hamster	1	26	New Zealand, United Kingdom	2003	ITV1	Traditional
Bugtime Adventures	1	13	United States	2003	TBN	Traditional
Chilly Beach	3	65	Canada	2003–06	CBC Television	Flash
Clifford's Puppy Days	2	39	United States	2003–06	PBS Kids, CBeebies	Traditional
Code Lyoko	4	97	France	2003–07	France 3	CGI/Traditional
Cosmic Cowboys	1	52	France, Canada, Germany	2003–04	Vrak.TV, France 3, KI.KA	Traditional
Cosy Corner	1	52	France	2003	Télétoon	CGI
Crawford's Corner	1	13	United States	2003	Discovery Channel	Traditional
Creature Comforts	3	33	United Kingdom	2003–07	ITV	Stop motion
Cuộc phiêu lưu của Ong Vàng	1	13	Vietnam	2003	VTV3	
Da Yingxiong Di Qing	1	52	China	2003	Shanghai Television	Traditional
Dip & Dap			Netherlands	2003	Z@ppelin	
Duck Dodgers	3	39	United States	2003–05	Cartoon Network, Boomerang	Traditional
Dyatlows	2	32	Russia	2003–04	REN TV	CGI
Eddsworld	6	65	United Kingdom	2003–present	Newgrounds, YouTube	Flash
Flutemaster	1	26	United States, China	2003	Omni Broadcasting Network	Traditional
Franny's Feet	3	52	Canada	2003–10	Family Channel	Flash
Free for All	1	7	United States	2003	Showtime	Traditional
The Frog Show	2	78	France	2003	M6	Traditional
Gary the Rat	1	13	United States	2003	Spike TV	Flash
Generation Jets	1	13	United States	2003–04	WCBS-TV	Traditional
Gnarfs	1	26	Germany	2003	Super RTL	Traditional
Gowap	1	52	France	2003	TF1	Traditional
Guardian Fairy Michel	1	26	South Korea	2003	KBS2	Traditional
Happy Stuff	7	420	China	2003–17	MTV China, BRTV-KAKU	Flash
Hello Woobi Boy	2	20	South Korea	2003–05	KBS2	
Hermie and Friends	1	16	United States	2003–10	Direct-to-video	CGI
Hey Joel	1	13	United States	2003	VH1	Flash
Hey Monie!	3	25	United States	2003	BET, Oxygen	Flash
Hey Yo Yorang	1	26	China, South Korea	2003–04	KBS2, CCTV-6	Traditional
Home Things	1	26	Portugal	2003	RTP2	
Human Contraptions	1	10	Australia	2003	ABC	Flash
The Hydronauts	2	26	Germany, France	2003–04	KI.KA, France 5	Traditional/CGI; Live action (France)
Jacob Two-Two	5	62	Canada	2003–06	YTV	Flash
Jacques Cousteau's Ocean Tales	1	26	Canada, France	2003	France 3, YTV	Traditional
Jakers! The Adventures of Piggley Winks	3	52	United Kingdom, United States	2003–07	PBS Kids	CGI
Jasper the Penguin	1	52	France, Germany	2003	France 5, KI.KA	Traditional
Jibba Jabba		32	United Kingdom	2003	Tiny Living	CGI
JoJo's Circus	3	63	Canada, United States	2003–07	Playhouse Disney	Stop motion
Jozi Zoo	1	16	South Africa	2003–04	e.tv	Flash
Jungle Beat	4	62	South Africa	2003–present		CGI
Kenny the Shark	2	26	United States	2003–05	Discovery Kids	Traditional
Kid Notorious	1	9	United States	2003	Comedy Central	Flash/Traditional
Kid Paddle	2	52	Belgium, Canada, France	2003–06	M6, Teletoon	Traditional
King	2	52	Canada	2003–05	Family Channel	Flash/Traditional
The Koala Brothers	3	79	Australia, United Kingdom	2003–07	ABC Kids, CBeebies	Stop motion
The Legend of Nezha	1	52	China	2003–04	CCTV	Traditional
Life's a Bitch	1	13	Canada, Philippines	2003	The Comedy Network, Oxygen	Flash
Lilo & Stitch: The Series	2	65	United States	2003–06	Disney Channel	Traditional
Little Robots	5	65	United Kingdom	2003–05	CBeebies	Stop motion
Lola Rabbit	2	52	Germany	2003–11	KI.KA	Traditional
Die Mainzels	1	24	Germany	2003–04	ZDF	Traditional
Martin Morning	4	156	France	2003–18	France 3, Vrak.TV (seasons 1–2)	Traditional (seasons 1–3); Flash (season 4)
Martin Mystery	3	66	Canada, France, Italy	2003–06	M6, Canal J, YTV, Rai Due	Traditional
Marvi Hämmer präsentiert National Geographic World	4	104	Germany	2003–14	KI.KA	CGI/Traditional/Live action
MechaNick	2	80	United Kingdom	2003–04	Five	CGI
Meet the Moores		10	United Kingdom	2003	Nicktoons TV	Flash
Meg and Mog	1	52	United Kingdom	2003	CITV	Traditional
Megaliga MTV de VJs Paladinos	3	52	Brazil	2003–07	MTV Brasil	Flash
Metalheads	1	26	United Kingdom	2003–04	CBBC	Traditional
Miffy and Friends	3	39	Netherlands	2003–07	KRO	Stop motion
Mole Sisters	1	26	Canada	2003	Treehouse TV	Traditional
Momo	1	26	Germany	2003	KI.KA	Traditional
Monkey Dust	3	18	United Kingdom	2003–05	BBC Three	Flash
My Dad the Rock Star	2	26	Canada, France	2003–04	Teletoon	Traditional
My Life as a Teenage Robot	3	40	United States	2003–09	Nickelodeon, Nicktoons Network	Traditional
My Little Pony (2003)		12	United States	2003–09	Direct-to-video	Traditional/Flash
Odd Job Jack	4	52	Canada	2003–07	The Comedy Network	Flash
PangPond the Series	3	65	Thailand	2003–14	Channel 3	
The Paz Show	2	80	United States	2003–06	Discovery Kids	Flash
Pet Pals	5	156	Italy	2003–12	Rai Due	Traditional (seasons 1–4), CGI (season 5)
Poko	2	50	Canada	2003–08	CBC Television	Stop motion
Pororo the Little Penguin	9	287	South Korea	2003–present	EBS1	CGI
Q Ban Sanguo	1	39	China	2003		
Ratz	1	52	Canada, France	2003	France 3, Teletoon	Traditional
Red Arrow	1	147	Russia	2003–04	NTV	CGI
Ren & Stimpy "Adult Party Cartoon"	1	6	United States	2003	Spike TV	Traditional/Flash
Sabrina's Secret Life	1	26	France, United States	2003–04	Syndication	Traditional
The Save-Ums!	2	39	Canada, United States	2003–06	Discovery Kids	CGI
The Secret World of Benjamin Bear	4	52	Canada	2003–09	Family Channel	Traditional
Sergeant Stripes	2	26	United Kingdom	2003–04	CBeebies	Traditional
Silverwing	1	13	Canada	2003	Teletoon	Flash
Something Else	1	26	Canada, United Kingdom, Germany	2003	Family Channel, ZDF	Traditional
The Spaghetti Family	1	26	Italy	2003–04	Rai Tre	Traditional
Spheres	1	26	South Korea	2003–04	MBC	Traditional
Spider-Man: The New Animated Series	1	13	Canada, United States	2003	MTV	CGI
Star Wars: Clone Wars	3	25	United States	2003–05	Cartoon Network	Traditional
Strawberry Shortcake	4	22	United States	2003–08	Direct-to-video	Traditional
Stripperella	1	13	United States	2003–04	Spike TV	Traditional
Stuart Little	1	13	United States	2003	HBO Family	Traditional
Teen Titans	5	65	United States	2003–06	Cartoon Network, Kids' WB	Traditional
Teenage Mutant Ninja Turtles (2003)	7	155	United States	2003–09	4Kids TV, The CW	Traditional
La Tortuga Taruga	1	8	Chile	2003–05	Canal 13	CGI
A Treasure in My Garden	1	13	Canada	2003	Teletoon	Flash/CGI/Traditional/Stop motion
Tutenstein	3	39	United States	2003–08	Discovery Kids	Traditional
Ultra Scared	1	52	France	2003	M6	Traditional
VH1 ILL-ustrated	2	13	United States	2003–04	VH1	Flash
Watch My Chops!	3	104	France	2003–16	France 3, Gulli	Traditional (seasons 1–2), Flash (season 3)
Wide-Eye	1	26	United Kingdom	2003–04	CBeebies	Traditional
Wilf the Witch's Dog	1	26	Germany, United Kingdom	2003	KI.KA	Traditional
The Wrong Coast	1	13	Canada, United States	2003–04	The Movie Network	Stop motion
Xiaolin Showdown	3	52	United States	2003–06	Kids' WB	Traditional
Yoko! Jakamoko! Toto!	2	52	United Kingdom	2003–05	CITV	Flash
Zentrix	1	26	Hong Kong	2003	TVB	CGI
Zip & Zap	1	26	Spain	2003	N/A	Traditional

Anime television series first aired in 2003
Title	Episodes	Country	Year	Original Channel	Technique
.hack//Legend of the Twilight	12	Japan	2003		Traditional
Ai Yori Aoshi: Enishi	12	Japan	2003		Traditional
Air Master	27	Japan	2003	Nippon TV	Traditional
Angel Tales Chu!	11	Japan	2003		Traditional
Ashita no Nadja	50	Japan	2003–04		Traditional
Astro Boy	50	Japan	2003–04		Traditional
Avenger	13	Japan	2003		Traditional
Battle Programmer Shirase	15	Japan	2003–04		Traditional
Beyblade G-Revolution	52	Japan	2003		Traditional
Bobobo-bo Bo-bobo	76	Japan	2003–05		Traditional
Bottle Fairy	13	Japan	2003		Traditional
Chrono Crusade	24	Japan	2003–04		Traditional
Cinderella Boy	13	Japan	2003		Traditional
Croket!	104	Japan	2003–05		Traditional
Cromartie High School	26	Japan	2003–04		Traditional
Crush Gear Nitro	50	Japan	2003–04		Traditional
D.N.Angel	26	Japan	2003		Traditional
Da Capo	26	Japan	2003		Traditional
Dear Boys	26	Japan	2003		Traditional
Detective School Q	45	Japan	2003–04		Traditional
Di Gi Charat Nyo!	52	Japan	2003–04		Traditional
Divergence Eve	13	Japan	2003		Traditional
Dokkoida?!	12	Japan	2003		Traditional
E's Otherwise	26	Japan	2003		Traditional
F-Zero: GP Legend	51	Japan	2003–04		Traditional
Firestorm	26	Japan	2003		Traditional
Full Metal Panic? Fumoffu	12	Japan	2003		Traditional
Full-Blast Science Adventure – So That's How It Is	26	Japan	2003–04		Traditional
Fullmetal Alchemist	51	Japan	2003–04		Traditional
Gad Guard	26	Japan	2003		Traditional
The Galaxy Railways	26	Japan	2003–04		Traditional
Gilgamesh	26	Japan	2003–04		Traditional
Godannar	26	Japan	2003–04		Traditional
Green Green	12	Japan	2003		Traditional
Gungrave	26	Japan	2003–04		Traditional
Gunparade March: The New March	12	Japan	2003		Traditional
Gunslinger Girl	13	Japan	2003–04		Traditional
Happy Lesson Advance	13	Japan	2003		Traditional
Human Crossing	13	Japan	2003		Traditional
Ikki Tousen	13	Japan	2003		Traditional
Immortal Grand Prix	5	Japan	2003		Traditional
Kaleido Star	51	Japan	2003–04		Traditional
Kero Kero King DX Plus	30	Japan	2003	TV Tokyo	CGI
Kino's Journey	13	Japan	2003		Traditional
L/R: Licensed by Royalty	12	Japan	2003		Traditional
Last Exile	26	Japan	2003		Traditional
Lime-iro Senkitan	13	Japan	2003		Traditional
Maburaho	24	Japan	2003–04		Traditional
Machine Robo Rescue	53	Japan	2003–04		Traditional
MegaMan NT Warrior Axess	51	Japan	2003–04		Traditional
Mermaid Forest	13	Japan	2003		Traditional
Mermaid Melody Pichi Pichi Pitch	52	Japan	2003–04		Traditional
Mouse	12	Japan	2003		Traditional
Mr. Stain	14	Japan	2003		CGI
The Mythical Detective Loki Ragnarok	26	Japan	2003		Traditional
Nanaka 6/17	12	Japan	2003		Traditional
Ninja Scroll: The Series	13	Japan	2003		Traditional
Ocha-ken: Chokotto Monogatari	26	Japan	2003–04		Traditional
Papuwa	26	Japan	2003–04		Traditional
Peacemaker Kurogane	24	Japan	2003–04		Traditional
Planetes	26	Japan	2003–04		Traditional
Please Twins!	12	Japan	2003		Traditional
Pluster World	52	Japan	2003–04		Traditional
PoPoLoCrois	26	Japan	2003–04		Traditional
Popotan	12	Japan	2003		Traditional
R.O.D the TV	26	Japan	2003–04	Animax	Traditional
Requiem from the Darkness	13	Japan	2003		Traditional
Rumbling Hearts	14	Japan	2003–04		Traditional
Rumic Theater	13	Japan	2003		Traditional
Saint Beast: Seijuu Kourin Hen	6	Japan	2003		Traditional
Saiyuki Reload	25	Japan	2003–04		Traditional
Scrapped Princess	24	Japan	2003		Traditional
Shadow Star	13	Japan	2003		Traditional
Someday's Dreamers	12	Japan	2003		Traditional
Sonic X	78	Japan	2003–05		Traditional
Stellvia	26	Japan	2003	TV Tokyo	Traditional
Stratos 4	13	Japan	2003		Traditional
Submarine Super 99	13	Japan	2003		Traditional
Superior Defender Gundam Force	52	Japan	2003–04	Cartoon Network, TV Tokyo	CGI
Tank Knights Fortress	52	Japan, South Korea	2003–04	TV Tokyo	Traditional
Texhnolyze	22	Japan	2003		Traditional
Tsukihime, Lunar Legend	12	Japan	2003		Traditional
Twin Spica	20	Japan	2003–04		Traditional
UFO Ultramaiden Valkyrie 2: December Nocturne	12	Japan	2003		Traditional
Ultimate Muscle	26	Japan	2003–04	FoxBox	Traditional
Ultra Maniac	26	Japan	2003		Traditional
Uninhabited Planet Survive!	52	Japan	2003–04		Traditional
Wandaba Style	12	Japan	2003		Traditional
Wolf's Rain	26	Japan	2003		Traditional
The World of Narue	12	Japan	2003		Traditional
Yami to Bōshi to Hon no Tabibito	13	Japan	2003		Traditional
Zatch Bell!	150	Japan	2003–06		Traditional
Zoids: Fuzors	26	Japan	2003–05	Cartoon Network, TV Tokyo	Traditional

== See also ==
- List of animated feature films of 2003
- List of Japanese animation television series of 2003
