= List of Cromartie High School episodes =

Cover of Cromartie High School DVD box set

This is a list of episodes for the anime series Cromartie High School.

== Episode list ==
No.	Title	Original release date	English air date
1	"I Used to be a Bad Boy Bragging Contest"	October 2, 2003	TBA
It's Takashi Kamiyama's first day at Cromartie High. The problem is that it's a school for delinquents and Kamiyama doesn't exactly fit in, Luckily, he has Shinjiro Hayashida to show him around. They go through the school meeting each of its wacky and hilarious students, including the three weirdest. When they come to the weirdest of three weirdest, Shinichi Mechazawa, they instantly recognize that he's a robot. But, no one else says anything.
2	"Blade Runners High"	October 9, 2003	TBA
Kamiyama and Hayashida are the only two who seem to realize that Mechazawa is actually a robot. They spy on him to see if anyone else notices that he's a robot. After two close calls, the boys give up. After school they spot Mechazawa getting beat up by some bullies from a rival school. Kamiyama and Hayashida spy on him some more, but nobody seems to notice, not even when they stab Mechazawa with a knife that simply breaks on his hard body.
3	"Cromartie High (Co-Ed)"	October 16, 2003	TBA
Hayashida hears Mechazawa humming a song in the bathroom. Later that day, he starts humming the same tune, but can't remember the name or artist. He asks Kamiyama, but he can't remember it either. Pretty soon, the whole school is humming the song thinking of what it's called. At the end of the day, nobody figured it out. As Kamiyama heads out, he hears Mechazawa humming the song! He asks him about it, but accidentally says that he knows it. Now, he can't ask the only person who knows the song's name, or else he'll look like a "tool". The song is Ningen Nante by Takuro Yoshida.
4	"Radio Gaga"	October 23, 2003	TBA
Noboru Yamanouchi of Destrade High is not only strong in fights, he is also a great comedy critic! However, he has a rival named Honeyboy, who might turn out to be someone he knows. The title is a reference from Queen song Radio Ga Ga.
5	"Sentimental Bus"	October 30, 2003	TBA
Yutaka Takenouchi is the most respected yet feared first year at Cromartie High. He is completely unstoppable in battle, thus no one dares to pick a fight with him or anger him. But he has a weakness – he gets carsick too easily. What will happen when he takes a trip to Nikkou? And will he be able to save Maeda after spending some time in a taxi?!
6	"The Empire of Ambition"	November 6, 2003	TBA
Takeshi Hokuto is the son of the chairman of Cromartie High. He doesn't want to go to a school with delinquents, but assures himself that his father can expel anyone he doesn't like. But, is that enough? And when Hayashida tells him that their school is municipal, can Hokuto cover up his mistake of attending the wrong school?!
7	"Pootan"	November 13, 2003	TBA
Noburou Yamanouchi of Destrade High has discovered that there's not much to watch on TV anymore. He hopes to form an alliance with Kamiyama, until he finds out that Kamiyama likes a new TV comedy! Will Noburou ever realize what's so funny about the new show? And what will happen when Kamiyama finally meets with his old Middle School friend?
8	"Electric Warrior"	November 20, 2003	TBA
It's time for the physicals. The doctor is an experienced one, but he has a problem checking out Mechazawa. So, he instructs him to head to another "doctor". Kamiyama and Hayashida accompany him and they wind up at an electronics store. The man there checks out Mechazawa but accidentally erases his memory. At Maeda's house, the boys celebrate Freddie's birthday (which is just a day Kamiyama and Hayashida picked at random). Then another day, they celebrate Takenouchi's. Maeda is upset that they have to celebrate it at his house.
9	"Reboot"	November 27, 2003	TBA
Mechazawa introduces everyone to his little brother, Mechazawa Beta. But, when Gorilla accidentally crushes him, can Mechazawa cope with it? And what will happen when he comes to pick his brother up, but finds out that he's been crushed again?
10	"Jackson"	November 27, 2003	TBA
Cromartie High Vs. Bass High! The Bass High students infiltrate Cromartie High School in search of information, while Hayashida complains about their school being too "normal".
11	"USA Trip"	December 4, 2003	TBA
When Takenouchi winds up in the USA, an imposter takes his place in Cromartie. Will the boys notice it? And what will happen when Bass High takes Maeda hostage again?
12	"Road Safety"	December 11, 2003	TBA
Some boys come to Mechazawa to seek help from their enemy Bass High. Since Mechazawa has a friend in Bass High, they hope that he will be able to help them out. But, Mechazawa tells them that they have to clean up their own mess. Mechazawa heads out to play pachinko, but gets mistaken for a pachinko machine! He then gets some gas, but is mistaken for a motorcycle! He rides his motorcycle in the cold air at a high speed. He crashes into a wall and is found in many little pieces by Kamiyama and Hayashida. They put him back together, but merge him into a motorcycle! When some punks start trouble with a woman, Kamiyama comes riding on Motorcycle- Mechazawa and rescues her. However, for some reason, he's thrown in jail!
13	"Joshua Tree"	December 18, 2003	TBA
The boys decide to play baseball in the woods. However, they soon somehow become lost and spend days there without any food! Will they find food and civilization?
14	"Talking Head"	December 25, 2003	TBA
Yamaguchi picks his second in command, his successor Akira. But, no one likes him. Will their opinions of him change? And, will Ishikawa finally get recognized by Yamaguchi?
15	"OK Computer"	January 8, 2004	TBA
Fujimoto of Manuel High is the toughest guy in school. However, when he goes home, he becomes a nice person while he posts on message boards. But, when a troll comes to the boards, can Fujimoto keep his cool?
16	"Japan Boss Championships"	January 15, 2004	TBA
Hokuto, who was not invited to join the Japan Boss Championship, attempts to join the fight. Later, no one can remember what Hokuto's lackey's name is. And when he tries to tell everyone, he keeps getting interrupted.
17	"Let Me Tell You My Name"	January 22, 2004	TBA
The Japan Boss Championships finally begin! Every school boss and punk is there. However, the championship isn't exactly what everyone thought it would be. Who will win? And, will Destrade High accept the winner?
18	"Pootan Gets Fired"	January 29, 2004	TBA
Pootan uses Freddie as a stand in for an autograph signing. However, when Freddie gets attached to the costume, will Pootan be able to reclaim his job? Or, will Freddie take over?
19	"Moto-Mechazawa"	February 5, 2004	TBA
Sadaharu is the fastest man on a motorcycle. No one has every caught up to him. However, Kamiyama unknowingly steps up to the challenge and becomes "that" man. He rides Moto-Mechazawa and not only catches up to Sadaharu, but passes him! But, when things go overboard and the police show up, will Kamiyama be able to get away, or will he be thrown in jail for not having a motorcycle license?!
20	"Lost Relation"	February 12, 2004	March 4, 2006
When Mechazawa loses his operating system, Kamiyama and the others must decide whether to delete his memory or to keep it intact. Meanwhile, Hokuto's butler closely resembles Hayashida, only an older version. He asks Hayashida if they're related, but both of them say they're not!
21	"A Trip For Heart"	February 19, 2004	TBA
The class takes a train ride to Kyoto. Takenouchi tries to keep his motion sickness a secret, and Yamaguchi tries to keep calm while the train taking him to Kyoto is having an emergency.
22	"You Never Give Me Your Name"	February 26, 2004	TBA
Hokuto's lackey decides to quit the Hokuto Corps. so he can have his own identity, while Hayashida feels that the name "Hokuto's Lackey" has taken root with everyone and that his real name doesn't matter; Kamiyama recruits Freddie to rescue Maeda from Bass High.
23	"Stone Cold Crazy"	March 4, 2004	TBA
Kamiyama explains the concept of change; Yamaguchi and Ishikawa discover Gorilla serving sushi at a restaurant.
24	"Gorilla Sushi"	March 11, 2004	TBA
Gorilla, whom everyone calls Gori, is now working at a sushi restaurant named Gorilla Sushi. He is liked by all of his co-workers. When the restaurant owner fights with his son, a Speculator, over selling the restaurant, Gori takes matters into his own hands, using Banana sushi to tell them that forcing what you believe onto others will not work. The owner decides to create 2 restaurants. He would pass on the new restaurant to Gori's coworker and the old restaurant to Gori. Gori's coworker tells the owner that Gori is a gorilla, but the owner won't believe him. Then, one day, Gori is absent. The coworker tells the owner Gori's at the vet.
25	"A Hole in Lotta Love"	March 18, 2004	TBA
When everyone brings their pets into school, Maeda get stuck taking care of them. The next day, Kamiyama tells Maeda that humans will never truly know what animals want. Kamiyama tells Maeda to act like a cat to prove his point.
26	"Suda!! Cromartie Girls Highschool"	March 25, 2004	TBA
It's Cromartie Girls High School and everyone is a princess! It's Ms. Kamiyama's first day and she walks around the school meeting all the princesses. Back at Cromartie High, Kamiyama, Hayashida, and Maeda talk about their future and Kamiyama points out that their worries are trivial compared to what Freddie, Hijacker, and Mechazawa go through. The series then ends on Freddie and Hijacker accidentally dropping Mechazawa and killing him.
