= List of Crush Gear Nitro episodes =

The following is the list of Crush Gear Nitro episodes, where the airdate shown is the date of the episode aired in Japan for the first time.

#	Episode Title	Japanese Title	Original airdate
1	Kike! Gia no Kodō o!	聞け! ギアの鼓動を!	February 2, 2003
2	Hide no Gyakushū!	ヒデの逆襲！	February 9, 2003
3	Kakusei! Mahhajasutisu	覚醒！ マッハジャスティス	February 16, 2003
4	Nazo no Shōnen TB	謎の少年 TB	February 23, 2003
5	Jurietto o Sagase!	ジュリエットを探せ！	March 2, 2003
6	Oe! Kingushubarutsu	追え！ キングシュバルツ	March 9, 2003
7	Rusuban Panikku!	留守番パニック！	March 16, 2003
8	Tokkun! IOD	特訓！ I・O・D	March 23, 2003
9	Giafaito Kinshirei	ギアファイト禁止令	March 30, 2003
10	Arashi no Giakurabu	嵐のギアクラブ	April 6, 2003
11	Hakunetsu! Gia Kōshien	白熱！ギア甲子園	April 13, 2003
12	Kessen! Yuu tai Masaru	決戦！由宇vs勝	April 20, 2003
13	Ugokidashita Kage	動き出した影	April 27, 2003
14	ZET no Shikaku	ZETの刺客	May 4, 2003
15	Kyōfu no Jamā Fīrudo!	恐怖のジャマーフィールド！	May 11, 2003
16	Kouda Ganbaru!	国府田がんばる！	May 18, 2003
17	Ubawareta Sandābureikā	奪われたサンダーブレイカー	May 25, 2003
18	Maboroshi no Giafaitā	幻のギアファイター	June 1, 2003
19	Sennyūsha wa Dareda!?	潜入者は誰だ！？	June 8, 2003
20	ZET Shitennō Shūrai!	ZET四天王襲来！	June 22, 2003
21	Totsunyū! ZET Gakuen	突入！ZET学園	June 29, 2003
22	Nitoro Gekitotsu! KN tai Masaru!	ニトロ激突！KN対勝！	July 13, 2003
23	TB no Ketsui	TBの決意	July 20, 2003
24	Urufu tai Jagā	ウルフ対ジャガー	July 27, 2003
25	Masaru no Fukkatsu!!	勝の復活！！	August 3, 2003
26	Sekai Taikai Kaimaku!	世界大会開幕！	August 10, 2003
27	Nessen! Giatoraiasuron	熱戦！ギアトライアスロン	August 17, 2003
28	Hide wa Mamorigami!?	ヒデは守り神！？	August 24, 2003
29	Kojō no Bōrei	古城の亡霊	August 31, 2003
30	Umi no Ue no Giafaitā	海の上のギアファイター	September 7, 2003
31	Shinka! Hebīsupaiku F (Fōsu)	進化！ヘビースパイクF（フォース）	September 14, 2003
32	Aratanaru Kuro no Ō	新たなる黒の王	September 21, 2003
33	Nyūkon! Mahhavikutorī	入魂！マッハヴィクトリー	September 28, 2003
34	Giafaitā Makoto!	ギアファイター・誠！	October 5, 2003
35	Mori no Yōjinbō	森の用心棒	October 12, 2003
36	Chitei Kara no Chōsen	地底からの挑戦	October 19, 2003
37	Futari no Arora?	ふたりのアロラ？	October 26, 2003
38	Natsumi, Namida no Mō Tokkun	なつみ、涙の猛特訓	November 2, 2003
39	Sekai Taikai no Yukue	世界大会のゆくえ	November 9, 2003
40	Marco no Shinjitsu	マルコの真実	November 16, 2003
41	Ōkami no Kodoku	狼の孤独	November 23, 2003
42	Unmei no Kyōdai Taiketsu	運命の兄弟対決	November 30, 2003
43	Kingukaizā no Shukumei	キングカイザーの宿命	December 7, 2003
44	Zero no Kyōchi	ゼロの境地	December 14, 2003
45	Sayonara TB	さよならTB	December 21, 2003
46	Hide, Saigo no Tatakai	ヒデ、最後の戦い	December 28, 2003
47	Chōjō Kessen! Yuu tai Masaru	頂上決戦！由宇 対 勝	January 4, 2004
48	Gia Batoruroiyaru	ギア・バトルロイヤル	January 11, 2004
49	Sankyō Gekitotsu! Saigo no Kessen!!!	3強激突！最後の決戦！！！	January 18, 2004
50	Nitoro no Kanata e	風（ニトロ）の彼方へ	January 25, 2004
