= List of Full Metal Panic? Fumoffu episodes =

Full Metal Panic? Fumoffu
- No. of episodes: 12

Release
- Original network: Fuji TV
- Original release: August 25 – November 18, 2003

Full Metal Panic? Fumoffu is a Japanese anime television series directed by Yasuhiro Takemoto and animated by Kyoto Animation. It is the second television series based on the Full Metal Panic! light novel series, and a spinoff of the main series comprising various stories in the short story collections. It aired from August 25, 2003, to November 18, 2003, on Fuji TV. The opening theme is "Is That Love?" (それが、愛でしょう?, Sore ga, Ai deshou?) while the ending theme is "The Wind that Blows to You" (君に吹く風, Kimi ni Fuku Kaze), both performed by Mikuni Shimokawa. For the North American release, the series was licensed by ADV Films. At Anime USA 2009, Funimation Entertainment announced that it acquired the rights to the first and second series. DVD and Blu-ray sets were re-released on October 5, 2010, and the series made its North American television debut on November 15, 2010, on the Funimation Channel.

The second story of episode 1, "A Hostage With No Compromises" did not air in Japan because it involved child kidnapping when real-life child kidnappings were making headlines at that time. "A Fruitless Lunchtime" was broadcast in its place. "Hostage" and another story "Hostility Passing-by" were later released as OVAs.

== Episode list ==
No.	Title	Directed by	Written by	Original release date
1	"The Man From the South"; Transliteration: "Minami Kara Kita Otoko" (Japanese: 南から来た男)	Noriyuki Kitanohara	Shoji Gatoh	August 26, 2003; Unaired
1	"A Hostage With No Compromises"; Transliteration: "Dakyō Muyō no Hosutēji" (Japanese: 妥協無用のホステージ)	Noriyuki Kitanohara	Shoji Gatoh	August 26, 2003; Unaired
A secret admirer leaves a love letter in Sousuke's shoe locker. Instead of finding the letter, he deduces that his locker was tampered with and promptly blows it up. From its fragments, Sousuke misinterprets the letter as a death threat and confronts his "stalker". After Sousuke's encounter with a gang leaves its members disrespected, their leader decides to take Kaname hostage. Instead of giving in to their demands, Sousuke holds the gang leader's little brother hostage and proposes an exchange.
2	"Hostility Passing-By"; Transliteration: "Surechigai no Hosutiriti" (Japanese: すれ違いのホスティリティ)	Yutaka Yamamoto	Fumihiko Shimo	Unaired; August 26, 2003
2	"A Fruitless Lunchtime"; Transliteration: "Karamawari no Ranchitaimu" (Japanese: 空回りのランチタイム)	Yutaka Yamamoto	Fumihiko Shimo	Unaired; August 26, 2003
After Sousuke causes a panic at the school's bread stand, Sousuke and Kaname have to fill in for the stand's lunchtime duties, which raises the ire of the physical education teacher. He attempts to sabotage their bread, but he falls for Sousuke's booby traps, when Sousuke was expecting that someone would tamper the bread. Sousuke forgets Kaname's notes at home, and they make a frantic dash to retrieve them and return before lunchtime ends. Despite their tardiness, they find out that the notes were not needed since their teacher coincidentally fell sick.
3	"Summer Illusion of Steel"; Transliteration: "Kōtetsu no Samā Iryūjon" (Japanese: 鋼鉄のサマーイリュージョン)	Yoshiji Kigami	Fumihiko Shimo	September 2, 2003
During a day at the beach, Kaname becomes upset at Sousuke's insensitivity. When she goes off alone, she is asked to have tea with a boy who is enamored with her. Sousuke, however, believes that she was kidnapped and proceeds to rescue her from her apparent kidnappers.
4	"The Hamburger Hill of Art"; Transliteration: "Geijutsu no Hanbāgā Hiru" (Japanese: 芸術のハンバーガー·ヒル)	Tomihiko Ōkubo	Shoji Gatoh	September 9, 2003
4	"Single-Minded Stakeout"; Transliteration: "Ichizu na Suteikuauto" (Japanese: 一途なステイクアウト)	Tomihiko Ōkubo	Shoji Gatoh	September 9, 2003
During a field trip to the park, the class selects Sousuke to be the model for their art project. However, Sousuke misinterprets the modeling advice he receives from their art teacher, turning the assignment with his classmates into a game of life-and-death. Kaname goes on a date with a former classmate to an amusement park while Sousuke and Kyoko follow her. Sousuke seems relieved that she's simply on a date until a drunken yakuza group threatens Kaname. Not wanting to reveal that he was following her, Sousuke comes to the rescue disguised as the amusement park mascot.
5	"The Pure Yet Impure Grappler"; Transliteration: "Jun de Fujun na Gurappurā" (Japanese: 純で不純なグラップラー)	Masatsugu Arakawa	Yasuhiro Takemoto	September 16, 2003
5	"Trespassing on Good Faith"; Transliteration: "Zen'i no Toresupasu" (Japanese: 善意のトレスパス)	Masatsugu Arakawa	Yasuhiro Takemoto	September 16, 2003
Sousuke and Kaname ask the school's karate club to vacate their dojo, which is slated for demolition. However, the club refuses to leave, challenging Sousuke to a duel where they'll leave if they lose. Sousuke defeats the club's members with relative ease until he faces the club's captain. As a test of superiority, Sousuke and the karate club's captain compete to care for the injured school janitor; however, their overzealous efforts do more harm than good. The janitor tries to be patient, but finally goes berserk when they accidentally serve his prized koi pet to him for dinner.
6	"The Hard Sell Fetish"; Transliteration: "Oshiuri no Fetisshu" (Japanese: 押し売りのフェティッシュ)	Noriyuki Kitanohara	Fumihiko Shimo	October 7, 2003
6	"The Patient of Darkness"; Transliteration: "Kurayami no Peishento" (Japanese: 暗闇のペイシェント)	Noriyuki Kitanohara	Fumihiko Shimo	October 7, 2003
Sousuke and Kaname investigate bizarre incidents where a masked predator attacks schoolgirls and gives them ponytails. With the help of a local policewoman, they set up a trap to catch the attacker using Kaname as bait. To teach a stoic Sousuke the meaning of fear, Kaname takes him into a haunted hospital, but she becomes more scared than Sousuke. They learn that the haunted hospital rumor was perpetuated by the mother and son living there who wanted peace and quiet.
7	"The Warcry of Excessiveness"; Transliteration: "Yari Sugi no Wōkurai" (Japanese: やりすぎのウォークライ)	Yoshiji Kigami	Fumihiko Shimo	October 14, 2003
To prevent the school from disbanding the rugby team, Sousuke and Kaname help train them for an exhibition match against a rival school. Upon discovering that the players are timid and passive, Sousuke subjects them to grueling basic training to toughen them up, which helps them win the match. The scene of Sousuke's grueling training of the rugby players by berating and abusing them to desensitize them to make them stronger references the boot camp scenes from Full Metal Jacket.
8	"A Goddess Comes to Japan (Part 1: The Suffering)"; Transliteration: "Megami no Rainichi (Junan Hen)" (Japanese: 女神の来日(受難編))	Tatsuya Ishihara	Shoji Gatoh	October 21, 2003
During a lull at the Mithril base after the events of the first season's final few episodes, Tessa decides to spend the time as an exchange student at Jindai High to learn more about school life. Sousuke, however, finds the stress of guarding her overbearing and collapses from fatigue.
9	"A Goddess Comes to Japan (Part 2: The Hot Spring)"; Transliteration: "Megami no Rainichi (Onsen Hen)" (Japanese: 女神の来日(温泉編))	Yutaka Yamamoto	Shoji Gatoh	October 28, 2003
Sousuke, Kaname, Tessa, Kurz, Melissa, and their friends travel to an onsen (hot springs) for some rest and relaxation before Tessa returns to Merida Island. Sousuke sets up a defensive perimeter and booby traps around the girls' bath, foiling the other boys' attempts to sneak a peek.
10	"A Fancy Without Honor or Humanity"; Transliteration: "Jingi Naki Fanshī" (Japanese: 仁義なきファンシー)	Sumio Watanabe	Fumihiko Shimo	November 4, 2003
Sousuke and Kaname discover that Ren Mikihara is a yakuza daughter whose members ask for their help to deal with a rival gang. Sousuke, in his mascot disguise, trains the yakuza members. When the rival gang kidnaps Kaname and Ren, Sousuke and his recruits rescue them wearing the special mascot AS. The episode was dedicated to Kinji Fukasaku, director of Battles Without Honor and Humanity, who had died earlier that year.
11	"Uncontrollable Bluebird"; Transliteration: "Mamanaranai Burūbādo" (Japanese: ままならないブルーバード)	Tomihiko Ōkubo	Fumihiko Shimo	November 11, 2003
A lack of space for all of Jindai High's student organizations prompts a review of each group's numbers. Because they only have two members, the social science club agrees to give up their room through a contest to see which club can recruit the most members of the opposite gender. Sousuke participates, but his poor social skills fail to attract anyone to his club. Kaname, feeling sorry for Sousuke, decides to help out so he can avoid a bet he made with another club.
12	"5th Period Hot Spot"; Transliteration: "Go Jikan Me no Hotto Supotto" (Japanese: 五時間目のホット·スポット)	Yasuhiro Takemoto	Shoji Gatoh	November 18, 2003
A classmate accidentally opens Sousuke's biohazardous container, causing a classroom quarantine. Sousuke later learns that the contents were not pathogenic but destroys synthetic clothing instead. Relieved that there is no outbreak, he now fears the repercussions from his angry classmates.
