= List of Scrapped Princess episodes =

The following is list of episodes for the Japanese anime Scrapped Princess. The opening theme is Little Wing by JAM Project featuring Masami Okui while the ending theme is Daichi no la-li-la by Yoko Ueno and Masumi Itō.

== Episode list ==
No.	Title	Original release date
1	"The Cast Away Cat Princess' Prelude"; Transliteration: "Suteneko oujo no zensoukyouku (pureruudo)" (Japanese: 捨て猫王女の前奏曲(プレリュード))	April 11, 2003
Pacifica Casull, Shannon Casull and Raquel Casull meet Christopher Armalite for the first time. Raquel saves Pacifica from a Mauser priest. In a quiet moment, Pacifica tells Shannon that she loves him and he tells her that he knows.
2	"The March Of The Soft-Boiled Knight"; Transliteration: "Hanjuku kishi no koushinkyoku (maachi)" (Japanese: 半熟騎士の行進曲(マーチ))	April 17, 2003
Leopold Scorpus is introduced as the party goes with him to meet Sir Barrett, from whom Leopold wants to learn chivalry. Pacifica empowers a dragoon, which she thinks is a lake spirit, to sleep by telling her everything is OK.
3	"The Unforgivable One's Noisy Song"; Transliteration: "Yurusarezaru mono no soudou uta" (Japanese: 赦されざる者の騒動歌)	April 28, 2003
The group stays at Winia Chester's inn. They are low on money so Raquel and Pacifica go to work selling Mr. Soopy bread. Meanwhile, Christopher kidnaps Winia, planning to use her as bait to lure the Casulls. This begins Chris and Winia's special relationship.
4	"The Concerto of Encounter and Departure"; Transliteration: "Deai to wakare no kyousoukyoku" (Japanese: 出会いと別れの協奏曲)	May 9, 2003
Shannon defeats Chris and saves Winia. Chris then helps them by recalling his knights under pretext. A Mauser operative creates a monster that threatens the city, causing Pacifica's powers to manifest themselves when she destroys it.
5	"Minstrel's Lullaby"; Transliteration: "Ginyuushijin no komoriuta" (Japanese: 吟遊詩人の子守歌)	May 20, 2003
The group encounters Kidaf Gillot the Silencer, who can control electronic bugs. A bug poisons Pacifica, and Leo and Raquel go to Sir Barrett for aid. They confront the minstrel and his bugs at the bug's lair, defeating them and obtaining a curative plant.
6	"Knight's Off-road Song"; Transliteration: "Kishitarusha tachi no meisou uta" (Japanese: 騎士たる者たちの迷走歌)	May 28, 2003
Pacifica recovers from her illness but Galil kidnaps Raquel and Shannon. Leo and Pacifica are given their location by Kidaf Gillot and go to save them. Ultimately, Zefiris makes Shannon a D-Knight and helps him destroy Galil.
7	"The Waltz of the Abandoned Dog Girl"; Transliteration: "Suteinu shoujo no enbukyouku" (Japanese: 捨て犬少女の円舞曲)	May 31, 2003
Christopher questions the Mauser high priest about the validity of the 5111th prophecy. Shannon befriends Cin, a little girl, and brings her home with him. At the end, Zefiris gives Pacifica a dagger and asks her to kill Cin.
8	"Nocturne of Bonds and Prayers"; Transliteration: "Kizuna to inori no yasoukyouku" (Japanese: 絆と祈りの夜想曲)	June 7, 2003
Zefiris explains that Cin is really Cz, a Peacemaker, and an enemy of the group. Pacifica refuses to kill her, and Cin runs off. Pacifica goes after her, and finds her with Steyr. Steyr changes Cin into Cz, but Shannon and Zefiris force them to retreat.
9	"Requiem for the Heretics"; Transliteration: "Itansha tachi ni sasagegu chinkon uta" (Japanese: 異端者達に捧ぐ鎮魂歌)	June 18, 2003
The group meets a Mauser priest at a restaurant and travels with him. They discover a hidden village of Browning heretics who imprison Bergens. The leaders of the village, Lenard and Elfetine, ask them to watch as they correct the world in a ceremony.
10	"Serenade of the Fake Princess"; Transliteration: "Nise oujo no sayokyouku" (Japanese: 偽王女の小夜曲)	June 21, 2003
Lenard has brainwashed Elfetine into helping him destroy the village as a tribute to Mauser. The group helps foil his plan and continue on towards Giat. Chris goes to visit Pacifica's mother, the queen.
11	"Rhapsody of the Beast Princess"; Transliteration: "Kedamono hime no kyoushikyouku" (Japanese: 獣姫の狂詩曲)	July 2, 2003
Chris tells Pacifica's mother about Pacifica. Leo and Winia set off to look for Pacifica. The group arrives at Giat and is immediately captured by Seness Giat, the "Beast Princess". At first she appears to be an enemy, but she is not.
12	"The War Song of the Two Princesses"; Transliteration: "Futari no hime no sentou uta" (Japanese: 二人の姫の戦闘歌)	July 4, 2003
Natalie explains that Pacifica is the "Providence Breaker" and that Guardians, people with magic powers, have been created to protect her. She is the only human capable of resisting the Peacemakers. Shannon and Zefiris combine and drive off Steyr.
13	"Distant Ricordanza"; Transliteration: "haruka naru tsuisou kyouku" (Japanese: 遙かなる追想曲)	July 13, 2003
Eirote explains that humans are trapped in their world because of a battle with aliens. The group wants to go to Leinwan because the Peacemakers are threatening civilians, but the dragoons stop their transportation, a mobile fortress.
14	"The Lost Quintet"; Transliteration: "Ushinawareta gojuusou" (Japanese: 失われた五重奏)	July 20, 2003
Natalie brainwashes Shannon in order to stop the group from going to Leinwan, but Pacifica reverses it and they continue on. Meanwhile, the Leinwan King is readying his most powerful weapons to stop them.
15	"Opera of Power and Plot"; Transliteration: "Chikara to bouryouku no kageki" (Japanese: 力と諜略の歌劇)	July 24, 2003
Winia visits Chris, but he goes past her without a word, giving her a strange look. The Leinwen priests fire their most powerful magic and damage the ship as the Peacemakers restrict its defenses.
16	"Duet Near the River"; Transliteration: "Kawa no hotori no nijuushou" (Japanese: 川のほとりの二重唱)	July 31, 2003
The blast from the battle gives Pacifica amnesia and she meets and moves in with Fulle. Leo, Winia, Raquel and others find her in the city, but let her stay at Fulle's house. Cz decides to tail Shannon as he looks for his sisters.
17	"Brief Chanson"; Transliteration: "Tsuka no aida no sezoku uta" (Japanese: つかの間の世俗歌)	August 7, 2003
Pacifica continues to enjoy her life with Fulle, while the military is close to catching her. Cz, more passionate than a typical Peacemaker, explains to Shannon why the status quo should be left alone.
18	"Back Alley Elegy"; Transliteration: "Roji ura no aika" (Japanese: 路地裏の哀歌)	August 22, 2003
Pacifica, Fulle, Leo and Winia disguise themselves and escape the city. Leo and his rival for Pacifica's love, Fulle, go back for horses. Fulle is killed making sure that Leo can escape. Shannon and Cz grow closer together.
19	"A Mother's Dreary Aria"; Transliteration: "Haha no nageki no mugon uta" (Japanese: 母の嘆きの無言歌)	August 31, 2003
Pacifica is captured by Chris and his unit. She is placed in a dungeon cell next to her mother, but she does not know that lady is her mother. Without realizing her mother is talking about herself, she tells her mother about her life. After seeing her daughter for the first time in 15 years, Pacifica's mother dies.
20	"Overture of Holy Destruction"; Transliteration: "Seinaru houkai no jokyoku" (Japanese: 聖なる崩壊の序曲)	September 6, 2003
The Leinwen military commander tries to use Pacifica as a bargaining chip with Steyr and the Peacemakers. This triggers a world reset where the Peacemakers are allowed to kill 90% of the human race, and Steyr and Socom start to demolish the city. Pacifica regains her memory after Shannon jumps in to save her when the soldiers try to kill her.
21	"Lonely God's Passion"; Transliteration: "Kodoku na kami no juunankyoku" (Japanese: 孤独な神の受難曲)	September 12, 2003
Shannon and Seness kill Steyr, forcing Cz and Socom to retreat. Then, Chris and his unit save Pacifica. Again, Pacifica thinks that everyone would be better off if she died, but Shannon challenges her thinking and she decides she wants to live.
22	"Rondo that Exceeds Time"; Transliteration: "Toki wo koeta rinbukyoku" (Japanese: 時を超えた輪舞曲)	September 18, 2003
The group, along with Chris's unit, camps in the woods. Celia appears and asks Pacifica if a caged bird (humans) wants to fly in the sky. Cz shows second thoughts about killing Pacifica.
23	"Oratorio of the Limited Ones"; Transliteration: "Kagiri aru monono seitankyoku" (Japanese: 限りあるものの聖譚曲)	October 6, 2003
Prince Forsyth requests to meet with Pacifica before her 16th birthday. When they meet, he stabs her and himself. They are then attacked by the military, and Shannon goes to fight Socom.
24	"Symphony of Those Who Protect"; Transliteration: "Mamorishisha tachi no koukyoukyoku" (Japanese: 守りし者たちの交響曲)	October 9, 2003
Pacifica dies and is called into Celia's world. Celia asks her advice, freeing the world from its cage. Pacifica's life is restored, and the three siblings go back to their village. Leo proposes again and Pacifica turns him down.
