= List of Maburaho episodes =

This is the list of episodes for all the Japanese animation series Maburaho (まぶらほ). Based on the light novel series by Toshihiko Tsukiji, the animation series was produced by J.C.Staff and consists of 24 episodes. Maburaho was first aired by WOWOW in Japan on October 14, 2003, with the episode "They Came...". The final episode, titled "It Was Over...", aired on April 6, 2004.

On March 8, 2004, ADV Films announced that it had acquired the license to the animated series. The first DVD volume, also available with an artbox, was released on April 19, 2005, and concluded nearly a year later with volume 7. ADV Films later released a Thinpack of the entire series on April 3, 2007.

The Japanese titles for Episode 18 and 19 ends in the typical Kyoto dialect ending "Dosue", which corresponds to "Desu" in standard Japanese. The characters traveled to Kyoto in those two episodes.

== Episode list ==
| No. | Title | Original release date |
|---|---|---|
| 1 | "They Came..."; Transliteration: "Kichatta......" (Japanese: きちゃった......) | October 14, 2003 |
Kazuki Shikimori is a poor student at a prestigious school of magic. He can only use his magic eight times before he turns to ash and disappears. In the first episode, Yuna Miyama transfers to the Aoi Academy and claims to be Kazuki's wife. Meanwhile, Rin Kamishiro and Kuriko Kazetsubaki are instructed by their families to meet Kazuki and obtain his genes, as they may create the most powerful magician in the world.
| 2 | "It Fell..."; Transliteration: "Futchatta......" (Japanese: ふっちゃった......) | October 21, 2003 |
Kazuki realizes the truth, that the girls were only sent to him because of his precious genes. However, Yuna reminds him of his past, where she promised Kazuki that she would become his wife someday. In this episode, Kazuki used his magic to create snow for her. Kuriko and Rin realize that Kazuki really has some magnificent magical capability, despite the low number of times he can use magic, commenting that it is almost impossible to create snow during summer. Kazuki's magic count drops to seven attempts.
| 3 | "It Appeared..."; Transliteration: "Dechatta......" (Japanese: でちゃった......) | October 21, 2003 |
A mysterious ghost by the name of Elizabeth appears in Kazuki's dorm room. Elizabeth demanded some things from Yuna and Kazuki. Later on, Kazuki broke his promise to the ghost which infuriated her. Elizabeth took Yuna to a void dimension where Kazuki thought she was being tortured, where in truth she was only being tickled. Kazuki used his precious magic to get Yuna back. His magic also caused the women's and men's dorm to merge. Because Kuriko looks like Elizabeth's mother, Elizabeth decides to take up residence in Kuriko's breasts. Kazuki's magic count drops to six in this episode.
| 4 | "I Saw It..."; Transliteration: "Michatta......" (Japanese: みちゃった......) | November 4, 2003 |
Kazuki is having nightmares that he is being attacked by a behemoth; at the same time, a rumor of a behemoth inside the campus is floating around. Dr. Akai, the school doctor, was keeping a behemoth sealed in a forbidden room since he is not powerful enough to abolish it. As it turns out, there was another behemoth being raised by Nakamaru. Kuriko decides to battle the beasts, but they overpower her. To save her, Kazuki ends up using his magic. His magic count drops to five in this episode.
| 5 | "She Made It..."; Transliteration: "Dekichatta......" (Japanese: できちゃった......) | November 11, 2003 |
Rin has a crush on the biology club president, who is transferring out of the school. She attempts unsuccessfully to make him a goodbye meal until the others give her a hand. Rin, who does not know how to cook, finally manages to prepare a meal for her senior, but before she gets a chance to present her gift to him, she stumbles and drops the food. Kazuki uses his magic to undo Rin's fall. Rin decides to give the meal to Kazuki instead of her senior, and she is impressed with him when he eats the whole meal, despite its terrible taste. Kazuki's magic count drops to four in this episode.
| 6 | "We Were Found Out..."; Transliteration: "Barechatta......" (Japanese: ばれちゃった......) | November 18, 2003 |
Kazuki's parents are coming for a visit and the girls all attempt to make a good first impression. Rin watches some videos on proper behavior in order to prepare for the visit. Kuriko plans a meal of Kazuki's parent's favorite food: eels. Yuna focuses her attention on Kazuki hoping to show his parents that she's the one for him. In the end, Kazuki's parents cancel their visit.
| 7 | "We Met..."; Transliteration: "Atchatta......" (Japanese: あっちゃった......) | November 25, 2003 |
It is time for the Aoi Festival and Kazuki's class, Class B, has done nothing to prepare. Then Yamase, an old childhood friend of Kazuki who is in class F, appears to make him an offer that would solve both their classes problems for the Festival: a joint play performance. During the chaos of the festival, Class B summons a beast that goes out of control, and Kazuki is left to save Yamase from it. His magic count drops to three as a result.
| 8 | "Gone and Done It..."; Transliteration: "Yatchatta......" (Japanese: やっちゃった......) | December 2, 2003 |
The day begins when Kazuki encounters a young boy who has just stolen three necklaces from Yukihiko Nakamaru (who got them himself under questionable circumstances). After Kazuki collapses while trying to protect the boy, the three girls attempt to find out the mystery behind the necklaces and the little boy while at the same time trying protect him from Nakamaru's revenge. The three girls end up reminiscing about their previous times with Kazuki.
| 9 | "He Used It..."; Transliteration: "Tsukatchatta......" (Japanese: つかっちゃった......) | December 9, 2003 |
With a magic count of only three, the girls start thinking of ways to help Kazuki increase his magic count. Kuriko lures Kazuki to a remote hot-springs spa that is supposed to increase a person's magic count, and Yuna, Rin and Elizabeth follow in hot pursuit. As it turns out, the three girls and Kazuki must play and beat a baseball team from hell. If they win Kazuki gets one more magic attempt, but if they lose they must go to baseball camp in hell for all eternity. Kazuki and the girls end up winning the game, but only after Kazuki had to resort to using his magic, so, while he did gain an extra use of magic from the game, it had gone to waste. His magic count remains at three by the end of the episode.
| 10 | "It Was Spent..."; Transliteration: "Nobichatta......" (Japanese: のびちゃった......) | December 16, 2003 |
In another effort to increase Kazuki's magic count, Kuriko and the girls search for a mysterious a blue magatama that could help Kazuki with his low magic problem. The magatama is tied to a girl who was cursed with bad luck in the past. Yuna has her own bout of bad luck from the magatama that does not surface until several episodes later.
| 11 | "I Opened It..."; Transliteration: "Akechatta......" (Japanese: あけちゃった......) | January 6, 2004 |
Yuna's father sent Dr. Akai some vials containing potions that might help Kazuki increase his magic count. Yuna ended up inadvertently releasing a pathogen from the vials that takes on her form but with a completely opposite personality. While Yuna goes around thinking of ways to save Kazuki, Dark Yuna wreaks havoc in the school. As a result, Kazuki ends up using another of his spell counts to obliterate the Dark Yuna. His spell count is at two at the end of this episode.
| 12 | "He Disappeared..."; Transliteration: "Kiechatta......" (Japanese: きえちゃった......) | January 13, 2004 |
As a result of the previous two episodes, Yuna has contracted a magical sickness that threatens to turn her into ash by depleting her magic count. Kazuki uses his second last magic attempt to fix her, but that doesn't fix Yuna. Kazuki gives it one more try using the last of his magic to save her life. Instead of turning to ash, however, Kazuki becomes a ghost.
| 13 | "He Came Back..."; Transliteration: "Modotchatta......" (Japanese: もどっちゃった......) | January 20, 2004 |
Starting with this episode, the focus of the girls shifts from trying to increase Kazuki's magic count to attempting to collect all of Kazuki's ashes in order to get his body back. Also, a mysterious girl meets Kazuki next to the maple tree. She asks Kazuki to point her in the direction to the old school building. Unfortunately, what Kazuki doesn't realize is that the mysterious girl wants to turn Kazuki into a complete ghost and add him to her collection of ghosts.
| 14 | "We Were Trapped..."; Transliteration: "Hamatchatta......" (Japanese: はまっちゃった......) | January 27, 2004 |
Kazuki meets with Ghost Collector at her house. Yuna, Kuriko, and Rin follow him into the house. Kazuki talks with the Ghost Collector, named Shino, trying to decide between being a human versus being a ghost. However, the three girls encounter many traps within the house. As Dr. Akai enters the house, he reveals that Shino is his sister. Shino will be watching Kazuki and the girls from now on.
| 15 | "He Ascended..."; Transliteration: "Nobotchatta......" (Japanese: のぼっちゃった......) | February 3, 2004 |
Rin's master shows up, trying to make her go back to the head family since Kazuki is dead. Rin pretends to be betrothed to Kazuki, and Rin's master decides to fight Rin and Kazuki to prove Kazuki is good enough to marry her. Rin's master later told Kazuki a bit about Rin's past and how he was forced to become cruel to Rin instead of the kind "big brother" when he was named her master. He also told Kazuki that what Rin needs now isn't intense training, but someone to allow her to feel the warmth of friendship, which he deprived Rin of when she was a child. A week later, the duel takes place but is cut short when Rin's master collapsed due to old age. As his time nears, he apologized for how harsh he was to Rin as her master, hopes for her forgiveness and bids Rin farewell; then he dies, his soul returning to the Noon and Rin crying over his body.
| 16 | "We Snooped..."; Transliteration: "Nozoichatta......" (Japanese: のぞいちゃった......) | February 10, 2004 |
Kuriko has been absent from several student council meetings. Elizabeth asks Rin, Yuna, and Kazuki to track her down. After following her, they discover she is on a date with a strange man who is up to no good. But it is revealed that the man is a criminal wanted for cheating money from women, and Kuriko is helping the police get the evidence needed to arrest him. Rin, Yuna, and Kazuki, due to misunderstanding, almost mess this up, which Kuriko was quite infuriated about.
| 17 | "They Decided..."; Transliteration: "Kimechatta......" (Japanese: きめちゃった......) | February 17, 2004 |
By strange twist of fate, it is revealed that Nakamaru also has some powerful genes himself. These events force the Kazetsubaki Family and the Kamishiro Clan to change their plans in respect to Kazuki's genes. Kazuki feels deeply pathetic about Yuna and the girls leaving even though they wanted to stay. Rin said that she is the one that really doesn't respect her clan's decision, Kuriko said that Kazuki teased her so much that she really doesn't want to go away, and Yuna actually won't leave without becoming Kazuki's wife. It gave Kazuki the hope to struggle on and the girls some hope to bring Kazuki back to life. Later on, Dr. Akai informs them that the news about Nakamaru was a mistake.
| 18 | "They Set It Up... Ya See"; Transliteration: "Shikakechatta...Dosue" (Japanese: しかけちゃった...どすえ) | February 24, 2004 |
Nakamaru and Matsuda orchestrate a fight between Rin (the Master of the Sword) and Sayumi (the Master of the Fists). At the end of the fight, Rin and Sayumi were to race around the track to predict the winner of the fight. However, a group of monks also participated but surprisingly won the race, causing Nakamaru and Matsuda's scheme to fail.
| 19 | "He Changed... Ya See"; Transliteration: "Kaetchatta...Dosue" (Japanese: かえっちゃった...どすえ) | March 2, 2004 |
At the end of the previous episode, Yuna, Kuriko, Rin, and Yamase all suddenly became horny, and get dragged towards Kazuki. The women compare breasts in the shower and feel each other up, there is nudity. A strange black circle seems to follow Kazuki, and the girls are drawn to him again during dinner. After the girls decide on how to spend their free time with Kazuki, decide on which times Kazuki dates each, and some comments from Yamase, everyone goes to bed. In the night, it is revealed that the magic circle was created by Shino. The next day, during each of the dates, Shino decides to stalk everyone, looking for an opportunity to capture Kazuki. At Yamase's turn, she cheats and takes Kazuki somewhere in the forest, while masking their auras. Yuna and the other become infuriated and start searching. While they are talking, Shino manages to capture Kazuki and Yamase, then proceeds to try to make Kazuki a complete ghost. Yuna arrives, and manage to free Yamase, but cannot reach Kazuki because of Shino. Yamase and Yuna are then restrained again, when Kuriko and Rin arrive. Rin frees Yuna and Yamase, Kuriko restrains Shino's monster. Rin then holds off Shino, while Yuna and Yamase go to save Kazuki, who is dragged into the portal, that turns him into a full ghost. Yuna and Yamase then proceed to jump in after him, saving him and returning to him a lot of his ashes. Everyone leaves on a train, and Yamase says that Kazuki hasn't changed.
| 20 | "She Delivered It..."; Transliteration: "Todokechatta......" (Japanese: とどけちゃった......) | March 9, 2004 |
Karei Hirosaki, Kazuki's dorm manager, is attempting to return a lunch box to Yuna. Throughout the story the main characters retell their interactions with Kazuki since they first met him.
| 21 | "He Was Lit Up..."; Transliteration: "Terasarechatta......" (Japanese: てらされちゃった......) | March 16, 2004 |
Kuriko tries to return her share of Kazuki's ashes to him, but she fails every time. Then her older sister informed her that she will leave for New York, but not before she attends her family's Cinderella Party, in which the party ends at midnight. Kuriko decided to bring Kazuki along as her "man". As time passed, however, she wasn't able to restore Kazuki's ashes to him and ended up losing a shoe after running up toward the balcony when Kazuki found her standing on the stairs in hesitation of what to do. Kuriko confessed her love for Kazuki and said that this is the last time she will ever see him and they almost kissed, but then Kuriko's ashes finally passed on into Kazuki, making him a step closer to being human again. Next day, it's seen that Kuriko somehow cancelled her journey to New York and stayed with Kazuki.
| 22 | "He Kept It..."; Transliteration: "Mamotchatta......" (Japanese: まもっちゃった......) | March 23, 2004 |
Rin Kamishiro is still worrying about what will happen to Kazuki if she returns his ashes, things are made more complicated when Kuriko decides that Kazuki will take Rin on a date for the day in an attempt to restore Kazuki's ashes. Fearful that once his ashes return, Kazuki will lose all memory of the girls; Rin resolves to leave, with Kazuki's ashes and never return, but she repents after witnessing the lengths he will go to keep a promise. After demanding that Kazuki will not forget the girls, she returns his ashes and everything seems fine until Kazuki collapses in pain. The episode ends with Yamase on a train wondering how everyone is.
| 23 | "We Were Seen..."; Transliteration: "Mirarechatta......" (Japanese: みられちゃった......) | March 30, 2004 |
In a bid to find Kazuki's final ashes Yuna, Kuriko, Rin, Yamase and Dr. Haruaki Akai travel into Kazuki's mind. They find who is responsible for holding the rest of Kazuki's ashes.
| 24 | "It Ended..."; Transliteration: "Owatchatta......" (Japanese: おわっちゃった......) | April 6, 2004 |
Now that Yuna, Kuriko, Rin, Yamase and Dr. Haruaki Akai know who are responsible for the remaining ashes of Kazuki, they are left with a choice as to whether to return the ashes to Kazuki to make him human and lose all of his memories or to have his ashes pulled from his body and remain as a ghost with his memories. Yuna wishes to return her remaining ashes to Kazuki, but Yamase does not. Yamase then runs away and Yuna, Kuriko, and Rin chase her to convince Yamase to give back Kazuki's ashes. Yamase is finally convinced and gives Kazuki's ashes back. The next day Kazuki returns to a human except, this time there are multiples of him.
