= List of Gungrave episodes =

This is a complete episode listing for the anime series Gungrave. Produced by Madhouse, the series is an adaption of the third-person shooter Gungrave, with original characters designed by Yasuhiro Nightow. The series premiered in Japan on October 7, 2003, on TV Tokyo and ended on March 30, 2004, running for twenty-six episodes. Each episode aired on the subsequent day on Aichi Television Broadcasting and then another day later on Television Osaka.

It was licensed for Region 1 release by Geneon, which aired the English dubbed episodes periodically on G4 and on Anime Unleashed.

== Episodes ==
No.	Title	Original release date
1	"Destroyer in the Dusk"; Transliteration: "Tasogare no Hakai Sha" (Japanese: 黄昏の破壊者)	October 7, 2003
Billion, a city that is ruled by a sinister man named Harry MacDowell and his organization, Millennion, has become the only safe place for a fugitive girl named Mika Asagi, who falls under the protection of an undead man called "Beyond The Grave". Grave, returning from the dead with no memory, wanders in search of his past, and after defeating some of Millennion's best soldiers, Harry's executive branch issues a manhunt on Grave, with Harry suffering from untold resentment for Grave.
2	"Young Dogs"	October 14, 2003
Years ago, there were two young men who were part of a four-man street gang, Brandon Heat and his best friend Harry MacDowell. This tells the story of their past lives together beginning with Brandon and Harry, along with friends Kenny, Jolice, and Nathan, surviving in the gang-controlled neighborhood. During this time, Brandon develops a crush on a girl named Maria, but earns the indignation of her uncle, Jester, who has a dark past. After beating a gang leader called Deed in a brawl, they soon attract the attention of a mafia enforcer and Deed's older brother named "Mad Dog" Ladd, who quickly murders Jolice and forces them to go into hiding.
3	"Rain"	October 21, 2003
On the run as fugitives from an unknown enemy, Brandon and Harry desperately try to keep their gang together as the death of Jolice weighs on all of them. When Harry tries to go and get help, he is betrayed by a sleazy information broker and returns empty-handed and wounded. Brandon turns to Jester, who demands that he leave town with his life for Maria's sake and then saves Brandon from Deed's men, before being killed by Ladd. Harry and his friends arrive to help, but everyone is killed except for Brandon and Harry in the end, before a man from Millennion, Bear Walken, arrives and rescues them, killing Ladd. Brandon and Harry take their revenge on Deed, Harry killing him with the pistol Bear left behind.
4	"Go"	October 28, 2003
Harry and Brandon become feared after their action, with Harry making a bold move by humiliating their neighborhood's crime boss. Harry decides to act upon his dreams of freedom after they bury Nathan and Kenny, and Brandon joins him. At the same time, Maria is approached by Asagi Caldwell, leader of Millennion and friend of Jester, who offers her a new life in his mansion and protection. While Maria leaves, Brandon and Harry are being attacked by thugs, but Asagi sends guards and his enforcer, Randy, to rescue Brandon and Harry at Maria's request. Learning that they are from Millennion, Harry begs Randy to let him join Millennion, and Brandon again follows Harry's decision, admitting that he hopes to find Maria and Harry by traveling into the organization.
5	"Millennion"	November 4, 2003
At Millennion's doorstep, Harry and Brandon part ways as Brandon works as a mafia debt collector, gradually getting used to the line of work and changing considerably as he witnesses death first-hand, gaining the respect of his coworkers. He reunites with Harry after one job and the two discuss how their lives have been going, and Brandon is introduced to Balladbird Lee and Bob Poundmax for the first time. Later, Harry gives Brandon the address of the school Maria goes to, and the two meet again for the first time in months.
6	"Big Daddy"	November 11, 2003
Maria, who believed that Brandon had died, is overjoyed to reunite with him as well. But Brandon receives a warning not to see Maria ever again from the heads of the organization, lest his own life be taken, which Harry laughs at thinking Brandon wouldn't have gone so far. The leader of Millennion, Big Daddy, summons Brandon to his mansion, where the two discuss Maria's situation and Asagi welcomes Brandon to visit Maria, but only at his mansion. Brandon is invited to a party Big Daddy is hosting where his connection with Maria grows, but the romance is disturbed by the events that occur that night. Harry, obsessed with gaining power by becoming a member of the "Family", the pinnacle ranks of Millennion that are close to Big Daddy, prevents an assassination attempt by a rival group, while Brandon saves Big Daddy but is shot in the chest as a result.
7	"5 Years Later"	November 18, 2003
In a span of five years, Brandon is now one of Millennion's best sweepers, a hitman with unbelievable skill and a strong friendship with Harry, who has risen through the ranks as well through clever business decisions and capitalization of Brandon's skills. Creating his own crack team with Bob, Brandon, and Lee, Harry has been strategically climbing his way up the ladder. A hit is placed on Harry due to his incredible influence and the hitman "Madman" Bunji Kugashira is introduced, attempting to kill Harry. Harry, however, reveals the deceit of the people who hired Bunji, and a three-way showdown starts once the deception is revealed and a massive gunfight starts, with Brandon joining the fray thanks to a frantic call from Bob. Bunji refuses to work for Millennion unless he is beaten in a fight, and Brandon gladly steps up for the challenge. At the end, Bunji is seen working as a sweeper and becomes Brandon's apprentice, loyal to him, the organization, and Harry.
8	"Family"	November 25, 2003
Harry and Brandon are finally inducted into the Family, Harry due to his huge success observed by Randy, one of the Family's top persons, and Brandon thanks to his prominence as a sweeper. At a party hosted by Big Daddy at his own mansion, they meet respected figures such as Bear Walken, who saved their lives as kids, Randy, who got them into the organization, and Cid Geralde, who was a friend of Bear's and was excited to meet the two youngest members of the Family. Although things appear to be going well, a botched mafia operation leads to Cid's son being inevitably targeted by Millennion, all of whose members must follow the "Code Of Iron" which means to "never betray" and that all who do must be punished with death. Bear confronts Cid, who allowed his son to escape under the promise that anyone, including himself, from Millennion would kill him no questions asked, and after the two share a friendly moment, Bear cannot bring himself to shoot his old friend. Brandon arrives then and silently fulfills the Code Of Iron, beginning his descent into apathy. Meanwhile, Harry hunts down "traitors" within Millennion.
9	"Dispute"	December 2, 2003
A man named Brad Wong is released from prison after serving eight years for killing 327 men, and reunites with an old war comrade, Cannon Vulcan, leader of Lightning. Vulcan has stumbled onto something big, a secret project that will create invincible super soldiers from the dead called "Necro-Rise". With this knowledge, both believing that they will be able to reach their own goals, Wong seeks to have an ultimate battlefield and seeks to remove all of his previous ties, quitting his former syndicate, Volcano, and getting the trust of his own subordinates. While the two discuss their plans in a secluded bar, Wong and Vulcan meet Harry MacDowell for the first time, who has become interested in Lightning's newest activities and skeptical of their motives at the behest of Big Daddy, who received word from the leader of Volcano about Wong's release. Wong, having the title of "Blood War" for turning everything into a battlefield, is about to shoot Harry in a drunken rage before meeting Brandon Heat, who already had Wong at gunpoint without his awareness. Amazed at the efficiency of these new enemies, Wong "prepares" his subordinates to become Vulcan's undead army.
10	"Conflict"	December 9, 2003
With the pieces in place and their forces gathered, Millennion and Lightning are ready to go to war with each other, with Brandon, Harry, Bunji, and Wong at its centerfold. Wong meets Brandon and Bunji on the street and sets off multiple bombs that send the city into a panic, and Vulcan's "Deadmen Army" succinctly begins raiding Millennion strongholds, unable to be killed and wiping out Millennion's hugest numbers along with several executives. Harry frantically attempts to warn everyone, but realizes that the only way Lightning could gain so much ground was if a traitor from inside Millennion was feeding them information. Wong and his soldiers manage to confront and "capture" Brandon and Bunji, and Brandon attempts to interrogate Lightning's objective. Blood War claims that they want Big Daddy, and Brandon agrees to meet him inside of a warehouse. Harry takes full responsibility for the situation and discovers that Lee, who is related to Cannon Vulcan by blood, is in fact the traitor, and challenges him to a duel, while Brandon arrives at Wong's hideout and prepares to face-off with Blood War and his undead army all alone.
11	"Heat"	December 16, 2003
The war has begun as Harry squares off against Lee who implements extensive training in the shadow and stealth tactics, and Brandon battles a mob of nigh-invulnerable undead soldiers. As his hits prove ineffective, Brandon switches to using D-Point rounds he picked up earlier and begins to blow away the Deadmen, though he is still unable to keep them down. Bunji comes to Brandon's aid, but its to no avail as both are injured. After sustaining massive damage from Lee, Harry begins to deduce Lee's motives and persuades Lee to temporarily believe in his cause and search for power and freedom. Lee becomes the first of Harry's many "transformed" familiars, and together the two extract the secret of Lightning and kill Cannon Vulcan, while Brandon and Bunji are on their last leg. Wong promises to revive them so that they can serve under him, but soon the Necro-Rised soldiers begin to disintegrate due to the experiment's expected time frame. Wong is injured by Brandon and retreats, and he and Vulcan spend their last moments reminiscing their history. As Vulcan dies, a dying Wong swallows a Necro-Rise formula and transforms into a monster in front of Brandon and Bunji. As Harry and Lee arrive, Bear Walken's Overkills blast the Necro-Rised Wong to pieces, with Brandon delivering the final killing blow.
12	"Kind"	December 23, 2003
Three years have passed since Brandon last saw Maria, and he has been living a cold and listless life ever since, regretting his profession as a killer and yet at the same time struggling between his loyalties to his friends, Maria and Harry, and to the organization, Millennion, and Big Daddy. Brandon has started his own group, True Grave, that have become more or less as skilled as Bear Walken's Overkills. Harry and Sherry have sentimentalized their relationship, against Bear's wishes. Harry begins to make illegitimate contact with Necro-Rise scientist Dr. Tokioka, and Maria reveals that she knows the truth behind Jester's death, Brandon's life, and Big Daddy's organization.
13	"Betrayal"	December 28, 2003
Bear Walken finally entrusts his daughter, Sherry Walken, to Harry, and all the while Harry is beginning his descent into betrayal as he roots and plants seeds of deception within Millennion, eliminating anyone who stands in his path. Randy is one of these very targets, who is beginning to suspect Harry's activities and has been set up by Bob and Harry to take the fall for Harry's money-laundering into his own Necro-Rise projects. Brandon and Maria fall apart as Brandon is unable to return Maria's feelings and entrusts her happiness to Big Daddy, who confesses his true admiration towards Maria. Now completely devoted to Millennion and Harry MacDowell, and vowing to never betray, Brandon walks down a path of darkness believing that he is unable to be with Maria, and his own apprentice, Bunji, is assigned to eliminate Randy. Everyone begins to suffer from the death of one of the Family's top members except for Harry.
14	"Die"	January 6, 2004
Harry and Brandon resolve to reach the top, Brandon through conviction and Harry through deception, but their friendship is slowly falling apart as old promises and old memories begin to fade from Harry's mind. Big Daddy gathers all of Millennion's Family to announce the next leader, Arzac Tino, when everyone believed it would obviously be Harry, who had taken control of more than eighty percent of Millennion by that point. They revisit the town they grew up together in, seeing an old orphanage where they first met as children, then going back to the bar where they once lived, and then to the graves of Nathan, Kenny, and Jolice, all of whom Harry had forgotten. Harry reveals that Arzac had suffered a heart attack and was hospitalized as they return to the Millennion building and begin riding up the elevator, Brandon stands in the light, while Harry stands in the dark. Quietly, Harry suggests that they murder Big Daddy and take over so that Brandon could have Maria all to himself, but Brandon responds by punching him and holds a gun at him as Harry reveals his traitorous nature. Harry, already bitter from overhearing Brandon remaining loyal to the syndicate rather than his best friend, angrily shoots Brandon multiple times and then through the left eye, pushing his best friend out of the elevator and to his death.
15	"Harry"	January 13, 2004
The death of Brandon has sent shockwaves throughout Millennion. Harry has now made it to the top of the organization and persuades any potential troublemakers to stay loyal. Bunji is unconcerned that his mentor has been killed and sticks faithfully to the Code of Iron, renaming the True Grave as The Kugashira Group. Big Daddy has faith that Harry will maintain harmony within the organization and reveals that Maria is pregnant with his child. Bear Walken decides to stay around to protect Harry and look after Sherry. While visiting Brandon's grave, Maria bumps into Brandon's old colleagues, Widge and Gary, who accidentally let slip to her that he was murdered for betraying the organisation. Big Daddy reluctantly informs her that Harry was the one that killed him. Dr. Tokioka has completed the Necro-Rise project and on the way to the startup Harry murders a shop owner and has a breakdown over the guilt of killing his best friend. He is cut short when news that the Necro-Rise startup has gone wrong and that monsters are destroying the facility. As Tokioka escapes the Necro-Risen Brandon is seen destroying several of the monsters that are on the loose.
16	"Letter"	January 20, 2004
As Harry, Bob, and Lee survey the ruins of the facility they meet an R&D member, Laguna Glock, who tells them that the Necro-Rise project works even better on live subjects and offers to continue it to make an army for Millennion, which Harry accepts. Dr. Tokioka delivers a letter from Brandon to Big Daddy in which Brandon confesses that he knew everything that Harry was up to but thought at the time it was for the good of the organization. He had also met with Dr. Tokioka earlier and asked him to revive him should anything happen to him if Harry veered off track, indicating that he knew something would have happened. Big Daddy stops Maria from confronting Harry and tells her that Brandon is still alive and gives her a case to give him if she should ever need his help. He sets her off to a safer place and confronts Harry himself. He tells Harry that Brandon knew everything, and a visibly upset Harry kills Big Daddy in a fit of rage, indicating he's slowly losing his mind. Harry vows to kill anyone and anything that can remind him of Big Daddy. Dr. Tokioka rechristens Brandon as Beyond The Grave.
17	"Mika"	January 27, 2004
Thirteen years later, the state governor is assassinated by a new type of Necro-Rise, called an Orgman, that is much stronger and can hulk up at will and Millennion now exports these orcmen for huge profits. Laguna Glock is tasked to increase the production by Bear Walken, who is disgusted by the newly evolved Necro-Rise project, but only remains in Millennion to watch over his daughter. It is revealed that Balladbird Lee and Bob have undergone the "Superiorization" procedure to make orcmen with consciousnesses. Maria has been tracked down and has a daughter named Mika Asagi. "Bloody" Harry, as he is now known, orders them to be killed in order to prevent any disputes over succession. Mika manages to escape the death squad, but Maria is killed, and Butler Tokioka is later killed by an Orgman. Mika makes it to Dr. Tokioka having learnt of her mother's past. While driving away they are attacked by a group of orcmen and Beyond The Grave awakens, which refers back to the opening scene from the first episode.
18	"Grave"	February 3, 2004
Grave kills off the orcmen attacking the truck. While passing Jolice's ruin of a bar, some jumbled memories flash back to him. He makes his way with Mika to the graves of Kenny, Nathan and Jolice and is attacked by some Millennion goons and a couple of orcmen. Having killed them the memories of one of the dead orcmen is retrieved by Bob who passes the information to Harry, who realizes that Brandon is back. More jumbled memories return to Grave and he determines that he was trying to protect someone but he cannot figure out whom. Bunji wants to kill Brandon, but the task goes to Bob, who wants to try to use his newly acquired Superior abilities.
19	"Superior"	February 10, 2004
In a short flashback, Bob is comatose due to his morbid obesity and high cholesterol. Laguna Glock suggests to Balladbird Lee that Superiorization might save him but it is a risk. Lee agrees but has himself undergo the procedure as a test subject first. Mika finds out about Millennion's history and who's who in the organization. She learns of Bloody Harry and the Big Four, being Bear Walken, Bob Poundmax, Balladbird Lee, and Bunji Kugashira. Having learnt of a big party at the mansion where all the big bosses will be present, Grave sneaks off to assassinate them. Instead he is greeted by many orcmen, a trap orchestrated by Bob's counter intelligence, as well as the big bosses. The bosses leave except for Bob who stays behind to test his Superior powers. While driving away, Bunji and Bear appear nostalgic about having seen Brandon again. During the fight with Bob, Grave remembers Harry and what it was he did to him. Bob eventually is killed when he cannot heal quickly enough from Grave's attacks.
20	"Brother"	February 17, 2004
Balladbird Lee is devastated after the death of Bob, his best friend. Harry figures out that Brandon must have had some help in order to be Necro-Rised and deduces that Dr. Tokioka was the one that helped him. Grave and Mika visit Maria's old home and he remembers more of his past relationship with her before joining the syndicate. Millennion discovers the location of them and Bunji goes in alone to confront Grave, whom he once considered himself to be close to. Despite being a human against a Necro-Rise, he has come prepared. Armed with bombs and a prototype weapon for use against the Necro-Rises, he confronts Grave, demanding to know why he betrayed the organization. Grave does not answer him and is nearly killed when Mika interrupts. Out of a sense of honor but very annoyed, Bunji doesn't kill Mika but scares her senseless by shooting at her. This angers Grave, and before the toxins can paralyze him fully, he violently beats Bunji.
21	"Duty"	February 24, 2004
Bunji is missing following his defeat at the hands of Grave and is later shown to be drinking heavily and a vagrant. Widge and Gary, who are now old men no longer with the syndicate, get a visit from Grave and Mika. Mika explains to them what happened to Brandon and Gary accidentally lets slip that Big Daddy was killed. Meanwhile Dr. Tokioka acquires information on everything to do with the Necro-Rises and Superiors, including their weaknesses. Grave leaves Mika in the protective care of Widge and Gary and drives to a roadblock where he is attacked by orcmen. Balladbird Lee deduces that since Grave is alone with a car he must be getting help from more people and tracks down Widge and Gary. Widge explains to Mika the history of Big Daddy and the circumstances of Brandon's death and they are interrupted by Lee making an entrance. Using his Superior powers, Widge and Gary are violently cut apart and Mika is taken. When Grave returns to their house he is devastated to see the fate of his old friends. Finally Bunji turns up at Laguna Glock's lab and offers his body to be upgraded.
22	"Remorse"	March 2, 2004
Balladbird Lee informs Grave where he can find Mika. However he is also accompanied by one hundred fifty orcmen. While waiting for Grave to show up Mika learns about her father, Big Daddy, from Lee. Grave defeats all the orcmen and Dr. Tokioka takes Mika to safety aboard a train. Lee uses his Superior powers to catch up to the train and attacks them, but using the information Dr. Tokioka has acquired about the Necro-Rises and Superiors, he has developed an anti-Superior bullet for Grave to use. Balladbird Lee's body disintegrates after he is shot with the new bullet, but Dr. Tokioka is mortally wounded in the process. Before he dies he tells Grave that he can only move for ten more days with the equipment left so he would have to defeat Millennion within that time.
23	"Daughter"	March 9, 2004
Widge and Gary are buried alongside Maria, Big Daddy, Dr. Tokioka, and Butler Tokioka, next to Kenny, Nathan, and Jolice's graves. In the event of Balladbird Lee's death, Bear Walken had made preparations to face Grave himself. Several of the executives in the syndicate are disagreeing with Harry's attitude of fighting against Grave, preferring for him to resolve his differences with Brandon in order to protect the syndicate. However, Harry would rather fight and has an Orgman kill all those opposing his views. Bear's Overkills track down Grave and Mika, but his last order to them is to disband. Grateful that Bear spared them from being made into orcmen, they respect his last order. Bear talks with Grave and arranges a duel at the mansion where nobody from the syndicate can get in Grave's way. Having heard what Bear had to say Mika understands why Bear is with the syndicate and that he is a decent man. At the mansion Bear's preparations for the duel are revealed to be his Superiorization but Grave uses the anti-Superior bullets. Before Bear dies he apologises to Grave and thinks about his daughter and what he had done to look after her, in a similar attitude to what Brandon had done for Big Daddy.
24	"Last Bullet"	March 16, 2004
The entire city is paralyzed due to the conflict and the Overkills have decided to become Harry's personal bodyguards. Millennion has split into two factions: those loyal to Harry and those who preferred Big Daddy, run by Biscoe. Biscoe's faction make several attempts to assassinate Harry during the day but none are successful, however Sherry is killed in a crossfire. Despite Mika's pleading for Grave to stop and go away with her as a family away from Millennion, Grave goes to the headquarters to end it once and for all only to meet a Superior Bunji in the deserted lobby. A vicious gunfight ensues and Bunji is killed but not before inflicting heavy damage to Grave, whose own body is not healing properly anymore. When Grave reaches Harry's office, he finds it empty but sees some framed photographs including one of the entire old gang, with Brandon, Harry, Kenny, Nathan, and Jolice. It ends with Grave's left arm breaking off.
25	"Then"	March 23, 2004
Grave is seen walking stiffly and aimlessly. Then the scene shifts to Harry. Having no allies left alive within Millennion anymore, Harry's days are numbered. Everybody is out to kill him and the new faction have acquired bullets to kill the Orgmen. Harry is the only one who attends Sherry's funeral. Mika tries to find Grave at the headquarters but instead only finds the new boss of Millnenion who tells her that she is no longer targeted and is free. While driving away from Sherry's funeral, Harry sees an Orgman get shot down and he is forced to escape the syndicate goons. During his escape he crashes his car and looks back at how his downfall came about. He then has a nostalgic flashback where they met Maria saving her from a gang of thugs and how Brandon and Maria fell in love at first sight. The old gang had fun hanging around, doing what they wanted, including following Brandon on his first date with Maria. Harry was happy with his life as he was free to do what he wanted. As Harry recovers from his car crash, Grave appears and aims a gun at him. He pulls the trigger but he has run out of bullets. They both start laughing like they used to before their syndicate days.
26	"Dusk of the Destroyers"; Transliteration: "Hakai-sha-tachi no Tasogare" (Japanese: 破壊者たちの黄昏)	March 30, 2004
Harry and Grave (Brandon) sit in the ruins of Jolice's bar and Harry tries to find out what went wrong. Eventually he decides to put an end to everything and gives Brandon his old gun back and takes out his gun with the intention they shoot each other. Suddenly they are attacked by Millennion goons and they both fight back, with Brandon shielding Harry with his own body in one instance. Mika pleads with Biscoe to halt the attack, but he refuses and coldly dismisses her because Brandon is siding with Harry. Mika then runs off in a desperate attempt to reach where the fighting takes place. Back at the fighting scene, armed police are seen with Anti-Necrolyze weapons. A grenade is tossed into the building, which causes it to collapse. Mika sees the rising smoke at the same time Biscoe catches up with her in a car and decides to take her to Brandon. Brandon turns out to have protected Harry from being crushed under a slab of concrete. Brandon fights back, but takes an Anti-Necrolyze bullet to his knee. Harry quickly tosses his gun to Brandon, but it makes him conspicuous to the agents and causes them to focus their fire on him. Brandon lets out an anguished roar as he sees Harry's body crashing to the ground. Then the scene shifts to Biscoe, who orders his men to stop the attack. Back at the fighting scene, the shooting has stopped, and Brandon collapses, his right leg breaking off. Harry approaches him, and Brandon tearfully admits that he can never shoot Harry, his best friend. Harry breaks down in tears. Brandon wishes to go back to the old days when they were happy and suggests they should shoot each other. Mika arrives at the scene, and with a tearful smile, says she and Brandon are and will always be a family. After that, the credits roll as Brandon's and Harry's deceased friends and family call out to them, and Mika is heard calling out to Brandon in the end. The final scene shows how Brandon and Harry met as kids, and when the screen goes black, we can hear Mika say "Welcome home."
