= List of Da Capo episodes =

Da Capo anime season 1 Japanese DVD volume 1 cover

The following is an episode list for the anime adaptation of the Da Capo series of games, including Da Capo: Second Season. The D.C. anime first season, animated by Zexcs, originally aired from 5 July to 27 December 2003 on the Japanese network TV Kanagawa. Based on the original visual novel's scenario where the player chooses Nemu, it featured the central characters of the game, while omitting some of the details of the other scenarios. As it was a general-audience anime, the explicit scenes of the original game were likewise omitted. Many episodes were accompanied by bonus material, such as music videos or side stories. The unique thirteen Side Episodes, although released concurrently with D.C., were produced by a different staff than the D.C. anime.

The second season Da Capo: Second Season, animated by Feel, aired from 2 July to 24 December 2005, also on TV Kanagawa. Da Capo: Second Season includes the premise and characters from the manga Da Capo: Second Graduation released in 2004, but the character development and plot progression are very different. The cast also includes characters from the expansion game Da Capo: Plus Situation. A notable difference between the two seasons is Jun'ichi's character design. It is believed that this production is intended to connect the original game to its sequel, Da Capo II, as the sequel game contains references to Da Capo: Second Season. Unlike the first season, there was no bonus material accompanying the series' broadcast.

Both seasons are available on DVD, but there is no official English release of this series at this time. The Da Capo Side Episodes were released separately from the regular episodes in their own DVDs, but the DVD-BOX release of Da Capo placed both regular and Side episodes on the same discs.

== Summary of series ==
=== Da Capo ===
No.	Title	Original release date
1	"Can't I Fall In Love?"; Transliteration: "Suki ni naccha dame desuka?" (Japanese: 好きになっちゃダメですか?)	July 5, 2003
On the crescent moon island of Hatsune-Jima where cherry blossom (sakura) trees bloom all year long. Jun'ichi Asakura who can observe the dreams of others, and his adopted sister Nemu wake up in the morning as they leave for school. A new transfer student at Kazami Academy, Sakura Yoshino, who happens to be Jun'ichi's cousin, arrives back from America to the Asakura siblings' surprise. The biggest surprise was that she hasn't aged a day since she and Jun'ichi last met six years ago. At the end of the episode, Sakura sneaks into Jun'ichi's bedroom window as Nemu is entering his room, Sakura kisses Jun'ichi on the lips. This upsets Nemu and she calls him a pervert before leaving the room.
2	"The Explosive Anti-Nemu"; Transliteration: "Ura-Nemu, Bakuretsu desu" (Japanese: 裏音夢、爆裂です)	July 12, 2003
Sakura's insistent affections (and ill-timed kiss) upsets Nemu's mood. She treats Jun'ichi coldly all day long. In class, Suginami gossips about their reaction. At dinner, Jun'ichi makes Nemu's favorite food, but she declines and has a cup of noodles instead. While Nemu is in the bath, Jun'ichi walks up to the door and sincerely apologizes, so she forgives him.
3	"So, it's Bananas, eh?" Transliteration: "Banana! Nandesunē~" (Japanese: バナナっなんですねぇ〜)	July 19, 2003
Although Miharu Amakase is reported hospitalized, Miharu appears in her classroom to everyone's astonishment. She is an android based on Miharu's appearance and personality, and Jun'ichi is charged with her care by his homeroom teacher Koyomi who also a researcher at the Amakase Laboratory.
4	"The Canary Under the Cherry Tree"; Transliteration: "Sakura no shita no kanaria" (Japanese: 桜の下のカナリア)	July 26, 2003
A mishap with Sakura and Nemu causes Jun'ichi to go hungry for much of the day, but the girl idol of the school Kotori Shirakawa who has telepathic power, whom he hears singing at the oldest living cherry blossom tree on Hatsune-Jima in Sakura Park, offers him one of his favorite foods, yakisoba. Later, she faints from a headache due to the amount of reading thoughts by other students, and Jun'ichi takes her the infirmary where Koyomi who happens to be Kotori's sister asks him to care of her. And the two eventually become friends. Upon returning home, Nemu surprises Jun'ichi with yakisoba.
5	"Because I Am a Maid..."; Transliteration: "Meido desukara..." (Japanese: メイドですから...)	August 2, 2003
On a day he skips class, Jun'ichi rescues Yoriko Sagisawa, a cat-eared maid, from torment by local children. She offers to serve as the Asakuras' maid in return, but she has zero experience in any maid skills. So Jun'ichi and Nemu help train her to be more comfortable of being a useful maid.
6	"Let's Go to the Beach!"; Transliteration: "Umi e yukimashō!" (Japanese: 海へゆきましょう!)	August 9, 2003
Jun'ichi reluctantly invites his friends to the beach, little realizing a certain promise he made earlier for Nemu to have gone just by themselves. Miharu does banana racing. Sakura and Nemu request Jun'ichi to put sun lotion on their backs. Anyhow they all enjoy fireworks as Jun'ichi goes finding Nemu at the scenery.
7	"Welcome to the Mizukoshi Residence!"; Transliteration: "Mizukoshi-ke e goshōtai!" (Japanese: 水越家へご招待!)	August 16, 2003
Jun'ichi helps Moe Mizukoshi get to school under the nose of the hall monitors, and she invites him to a nabe meal in return at the Mizukoshi's residence by using a live duck for cooking. Nemu heads to a hospital as an excuse after a quarrel between Sakura and Yoriko. She finds Jun'ichi there and leaves together without having dinner at all.
8	"Utamaru's Spring (Recap Episode)"; Transliteration: "Utamaru no haru (sōshūhen)" (Japanese: うたまるの春(総集編))	August 23, 2003
9	"The Mysterious Poet"; Transliteration: "Nazo no poemā" (Japanese: 謎のポエマー)	August 30, 2003
Various poems anonymously appear across Nemu's path, from a secret admirer who is also an obsessive eavesdropper. In the end, the secret admirer guy deserts Nemu when realizing she thought he was a girl the whole time.
10	"I Wanted You to Hear It"; Transliteration: "Anata ni kikasetakute" (Japanese: あなたに聴かせたくて)	September 6, 2003
The school's cultural festival is here, Sakura tries to set up her own Cosplay café. Miharu and Nemu hang out together. Suginami has Jun'ichi convinces Kotori to enter the beauty pageant in the cultural festival. Unfortunately, Jun'ichi also agrees to go to her recital and meet with Nemu at the same time. Reading his thoughts, Kotori lied her recital been canceled to have him spend time with Nemu instead. Kotori won the pageant, and later Jun'ichi secretly listens to her sing.
11	"Let's Go Outside!"; Transliteration: "Soto ni deyō!" (Japanese: 外にでよう!)	September 13, 2003
While exaggerating the wonderful time of the outdoors, Jun'ichi, Nemu, Sakura, and Suginami try various plans to coax the hikikomori Yoriko outside by making Jun'ichi and Nemu act like a couple for her sake. Yoriko reveals how her mistress (Misaki) is always looking out at the world through her room window (but doesn't specifically mention that she is her cat in form of a human now).
12	"We're Only Pretending to Date, Okay?!"; Transliteration: "Koibito gokko dakara ne!" (Japanese: 恋人ごっこだからね!)	September 20, 2003
Moe's sister Mako Mizukoshi asks Jun'ichi an unusual favor to help her turn down a persistent girl suitor by pretending to be dating. After the stalker has given up, Mako wonders about her own feelings for Jun'ichi.
13	"Sakura's Breas—er, Apprehension!?"; Transliteration: "Sakura no mune·sawagi!?" (Japanese: さくらの胸·騒ぎ!?)	September 27, 2003
Suginami sponsors a trip for everyone to a jungle-themed resort, where Moe causes a bit of a ruckus.
14	"A Puppy's Shopping"; Transliteration: "Wanko na shoppingu" (Japanese: わんこなショッピング)	October 4, 2003
Jun'ichi dreams about Nemu wearing his worn out shirt. As Nemu ponders the Asakuras' finances, Miharu asks Jun'ichi to take her shopping. They run into Nemu, who does a little shopping of her own. Jun'ichi buys her a ring.
15	"Recap Episode"; Transliteration: "Sōshūhen" (Japanese: 総集編)	October 11, 2003
16	"A Poor Excuse for a Magician"; Transliteration: "Dekisokonai no mahōtsukai" (Japanese: 出来損ないの魔法使い)	October 18, 2003
Jun'ichi has a dream about his grandmother, Yoshino; who taught him how to magically create Japanese confections. Nemu tries to ask Jun'ichi on a date, but Sakura invites him to her house on the same day and time. Nemu invites Miharu instead, improvising a story that she would stay at her friend's house.
17	"The Feelings That Fall Short"; Transliteration: "Todokanu omoi" (Japanese: 届かぬ想い)	October 25, 2003
Nemu discovers Miharu's secret when going to a theater together. Sakura and Jun'ichi reflect on the past together at her house, and Sakura tries to win Jun'ichi's affections. She reveals how the main cherry blossom tree was born with magical powers that their grandmother planted. The cherry blossom tree that grants the people of Hatsune-Jima wishes for their desire which causes the island's sakura trees to bloom everlasting. Nemu also reflects on how she was taken into Jun'ichi's family and began to realise her own feelings for him.
18	"The Secret Between the Two"; Transliteration: "Futari dake no himitsu" (Japanese: 二人だけの秘密)	November 1, 2003
Jun'ichi re-examines his relationship with Nemu, and she explains why she dislikes Japanese sweets; because she was jealous of Sakura. Jun'ichi remembered how Nemu went missing and found her at the cherry blossom tree, and made a promise to stay by her side. Nemu confesses her love to Jun'ichi, and wanting to become more than just siblings they share a kiss.
19	"A Blissful Time"; Transliteration: "Shiawase na jikan" (Japanese: 幸せな時間)	November 8, 2003
The transformation in Jun'ichi and Nemu's relationship becomes the talk of the school; Miharu even supports them. Sakura and Suginami warn them against taking the relationship further, in spite of Jun'ichi and Nemu aren't related by blood. Jun'ichi mediates with Sakura. Nemu collapses during a student council meeting, and that night she and Jun'ichi become even closer despite the warnings. Sakura senses Jun'ichi's determination.
20	"Feelings in Disagreement"; Transliteration: "Surechigau kimochi" (Japanese: すれ違う気持ち)	November 15, 2003
Seeing Jun'ichi and Nemu closer than ever before, Sakura tries to pull them apart using Jun'ichi's sense of honor regarding the promise they made under the cherry blossom tree six years ago, sparking a heated quarrel between the two girls. Unable to keep a certain promise from their childhood Jun'ichi makes a decision. That night, Nemu collapses in Jun'ichi's arms, with cherry blossom petals falling from her lips.
21	"Sakura's Determination"; Transliteration: "Sakura no kesshin" (Japanese: さくらの決心)	November 22, 2003
Having realized she lost to Nemu, Sakura decides to move on, but when word of Nemu's unusual condition reaches her, she rushes to her side. A chat with Yoriko prompts Sakura to make a fateful decision. Believing the magic has become troublesome Sakura sacrifices her most important thing and withers the magical cherry blossom tree.
22	"Wonderful Memories"; Transliteration: "Suteki na omoide" (Japanese: すてきな思い出)	November 29, 2003
Nemu manages to regain consciousness, to the relief of Jun'ichi and his friends. Yoriko asks Jun'ichi for her "wages": a date at night. Together they share Yoriko's dream, going to school together and building wonderful memories with the boy Misaki fell in love with. In the end, Yoriko finally returns to her mistress as her cat.
23	"An Honest Confession"; Transliteration: "Sugao no kokuhaku" (Japanese: 素顔の告白)	December 6, 2003
Jun'ichi has a dream about Kotori. Kotori realizes that her telepathic power is fading due to have the cherry blossom tree been wither, sensing only painful noise when she tries to probe anyone but Jun'ichi. She focuses her attention on him, as being able to sense his thoughts puts her at ease; however, her friends point out that she is also falling in love. Jun'ichi learns from Kotori that she was actually adopted into the Shirakawa family and gained the ability to read minds from the wish granting cherry blossom tree.
24	"The Door into Memories"; Transliteration: "Kioku no tobira" (Japanese: 記憶の扉)	December 13, 2003
Miharu the android, in order to become more like her human counterpart, attempts to search for Miharu's memories within herself, despite the fact that they weren't a part of her programming design, and the fact that such searching greatly shortens her lifespan. Jun'ichi spends the last moments with her.
25	"Breaking Hearts"; Transliteration: "Kowareyuku kokoro" (Japanese: 壊れゆく心)	December 20, 2003
Despite Nemu's earlier recovery, she is still bedridden, and has resumed coughing cherry blossom petals. Sakura, upon discovering this, realizes that the magic cherry blossom tree had not died, and that she had not truly let go of Jun'ichi. Sakura decides to leave Hatsune-jima, to put distance between herself and Jun'ichi. Mako and Suginami visit Nemu, but they find that Nemu does not remember who they are and becomes anxious.
26	"Finale"; Transliteration: "Saishūkai" (Japanese: 最終回)	December 27, 2003
Sakura, hearing about Nemu's amnesia, tries desperately to stop the cherry blossom tree, which responds by blooming even more. Nemu wanders away from home in a daze, and Jun'ichi goes looking for her. Jun'ichi found Sakura and is able to get through to her and wither the cherry blossom tree at last. Nemu appears and Jun'ichi is happy to see her. Sakura now only wishes for Jun'ichi and Nemu's happiness. The Hatsune-Jima sakura trees are now ordinary sakura trees; nevertheless, all the islanders will live normally from now on.

=== Da Capo: Side Episodes ===
No.	Title	Original release date
8	"Side Episode 1"	August 23, 2003
Nemu, Miharu, Kotori, and Mako share some scary stories and folk tales. Like why is the name "Sakura" consider sacred.
9	"Side Episode 2"	August 30, 2003
A day in the life of Nemu, through Jun'ichi's eyes.
10	"Side Episode 3"	September 6, 2003
During a day at the beach, Kotori meets an unusual stranger.
11	"Side Episode 4"	September 13, 2003
Sakura makes a video for her American friends, and meets the stranger at a soba restaurant.
12	"Side Episode 5"	September 20, 2003
Yoriko ventures outside during the day, finding an (unusually) affectionate Utamaru.
13	"Side Episode 6"	September 27, 2003
Miharu the android experiences new things online.
14	"Side Episode 7"	October 4, 2003
Moe finds fascinating (and at times, deadly) sea creatures at the beach.
16	"Side Episode 8"	October 18, 2003
During a heavy rainstorm, Nemu and Mako take shelter in an old, dilapidated house.
17	"Side Episode 9"	October 25, 2003
Yoriko ventures outside again, this time at night.
18	"Side Episode 10"	November 1, 2003
Nemu, Moe, and Mako follow a strange being into the forest and become lost.
19	"Side Episode 11"	November 8, 2003
The stranger has a flashback vision of his youth in Hatsune-jima, at an abandoned shrine.
20	"Side Episode 12"	November 15, 2003
The stranger sees a montage of the previous Side Episodes in an abandoned movie theater, then a flashback of his parting with Yoshino.
21	"Side Episode 13"	November 22, 2003
The girls (sans Yoriko) decide to find the stranger that Sakura calls Strange-san (不思議さん, fushigi-san).

=== Da Capo: Second Season ===
D.C.: S.S, takes place two years after Nemu and Sakura left Hatsune-Jima.

No.	Title	Original release date
1	"Two Years Since Then..."; Transliteration: "Are kara ninen..." (Japanese: あれから2年...)	July 2, 2005
Jun'ichi, with the help of his group of friends (the self-appointed "Support Team"), manages his daily life in Nemu's absence for two years. Miharu wakes him up in the morning. Suginami and Kanae Kudō always accompany him in class. Kotori cooks for him as well out of kindness. She takes a bath much to Jun'ichi's embarrassment. On a stormy summer day, a mysterious young girl arrives at his door.
2	"Unreadable Map"; Transliteration: "Yomenai Chizu" (Japanese: 読めない地図)	July 9, 2005
Jun'ichi and Kotori decide to skip school and help the girl, Aisia, find her destination on a rain-soaked map written in a foreign language. Jun'ichi tells Aisia the story how the island's sakura trees used to bloom all year long 2 years ago. By the end of the day, they figure out the person that Aisia is looking for is Grandma Yoshino so she can study magic to be an excellent wizard.
3	"Beneath the Same Roof"; Transliteration: "Hitotsu yane no shita" (Japanese: ひとつ屋根の下)	July 16, 2005
After learning that Grandma Yoshino had long since pass away, and when Jun'ichi inadvertently showed his only magical skill because he is Yoshino's grandchild, Aisia decides to make him her "Master". When Mako discovers her, she insists on having Aisia stay at the Mizukoshi residence, until it becomes too difficult to have her around. Aisia then returns to Jun'ichi's house to stay.
4	"Past the Rows of Cherry Trees"; Transliteration: "Sakura namiki no mukō ni" (Japanese: 桜並木の向こうに)	July 23, 2005
Aisia has been settled into living at Jun'ichi's house, and he mentions she will be going to Kazami Academy with him apparently. Convince that Jun'ichi studies at a school of magic, Aisia sneaks into the school and begins to cause chaos with her magic when she tries to make things more convenient for the campus. Jun'ichi overslept and arrives at school just in time to find Aisia.
5	"Magic's Tail"; Transliteration: "Mahō no shippo" (Japanese: 魔法のしっぽ)	July 30, 2005
Aisia is now enrolled to Kazami Academy. She keeps a close eye on Jun'ichi to "catch" him using magic, despite his insistence that he can only conjure Japanese confections. They accidentally got carried away in a garbage truck and into a dumpster. Jun'ichi helps protect Aisia, then they are rescued by Suginami, Kotori, and Mako. Aisia decides to train herself from now on since she is convinced that Jun'ichi really not the type of wizard she had imagined.
6	"A Letter for Miharu"; Transliteration: "Miharu e no tegami" (Japanese: 美春への手紙)	August 6, 2005
Rumors abound after Miharu discovers a letter in her shoe locker thinking it's from a secret admirer. At a special meeting in the gymnasium host by the new doctor, Akishima, they discover Nemu has returned after two years at Nursing College, much to Jun'ichi's surprise! Miharu welcomes her, illuminating Nemu the one who sent her the letter. However, Nemu later comes looking for Jun'ichi once heard from Mako that he's in a state of depression for not taking Nemu's sudden return very well.
7	"Crossing and Missing Each Other"; Transliteration: "Surechigai" (Japanese: すれ違い)	August 13, 2005
Nemu stayed at Miharu's house after a fight over about Aisia living with Jun'ichi. She sneaks back home to see what their daily routine is. Today is a physical examination at school; Jun'ichi worried after Suginami trick him into thinking that Nemu is doing the boys' measurements. Jun'ichi is exacerbated when he becomes jealous of Dr. Akishima in the infirmary who seems to be close to Nemu, causing him to be doubtful of her. Aisia tries to come up with a strategy to have them settle.
8	"A Storm Foreseen"; Transliteration: "Arashi no yokan" (Japanese: 嵐の予感)	August 20, 2005
Jun'ichi attempted to find Nemu in the rain when he felt a premonition last night. Aisia goes to town with Jun'ichi to ease his depression. She bumps into Kotori and she teaches her the relationship between "lovers". After another heated fight with Nemu, Jun'ichi confronts Dr. Akishima. He reveals to Jun'ichi how much Nemu thought of him over the past two years of living outside of Hatsune-Jima, and wrote letters of her hardworking in Nursing College but never had sent them to him because she didn't want to give Jun'ichi worries. Jun'ichi finally resolves his behavior.
9	"Unwithering Feelings"; Transliteration: "Karenai omoi" (Japanese: 枯れない想い)	August 27, 2005
Jun'ichi endeavors to rekindle with Nemu, although she not in the mood. After Aisia had a chat with Misaki, Aisia and Miharu concoct a plan to get Jun'ichi and Nemu to reconcile on a picnic at Sakura Park. At the base of the dead magical cherry blossom tree, Jun'ichi and Nemu talk about his grandmother, Ricca Yoshino, who always cared for him and her. The two renew their old promise then reconcile themselves at last and hold hands happily. In conclusion, Aisia believes the magic within the cherry blossom tree.
10	"I'm Joining"; Transliteration: "Nyūbu shimasu!" (Japanese: 入部します!)	September 3, 2005
Jun'ichi and Nemu lose sleep watching a drama series on DVD. Left alone, Aisia joins Tamaki Konomiya's miko club, thinking that Shinto is an eastern form of magic. She decides to use her newfound knowledge on the school's baseball team, who is known for fifty straight losses without even a hit.
11	"Writing In Progress!"; Transliteration: "Tadaima shippitsu chū!" (Japanese: ただいま執筆中!)	September 10, 2005
When Nanako Saitama has trouble making a deadline for the final chapter of her magical girl manga comic, Aisia decides to provide some inspiration. In the end, when Aisia cheers up a boy with her magic Nanako takes the initiative to create another series for her manga.
12	"The Two Stars of Hatsune-Jima"; Transliteration: "Hatsune-jima no daburu sutã" (Japanese: 初音島のWスター)	September 17, 2005
Aisia and Alice Tsukishiro put together a talent show for the hospitalized children at a hospital where Nemu works at, in particular for a young girl who loves the circus. Aisia and Alice rescue the girl when she'd run out on a raft out in the ocean. Alice's talents satisfy the girl.
13	"Aisia's Summer"; Transliteration: "Aisia no natsu" (Japanese: アイシアの夏)	September 24, 2005
The class struggles through the summer term exam. Tamaki offers the gang over for a relaxation. As Jun'ichi and Nemu plan for the imminent summer vacation, Aisia continues her solo magic training. Aisia reveals about her grandma who taught her how to use magic while traveling from village to another in Northern Europe. Early morning, she meets Misaki and chat with her again.
14	"Door of the Heart"; Transliteration: "Kokoro no tobira" (Japanese: 心の扉)	October 1, 2005
Kotori bumps into Jun'ichi looking at swimsuits for Nemu. During the trip to the beach after they pack into a cozy hut, the girls show off their sexy aspects, Alice tastes Miharu's fried fish, Nanako says the salty sea is a mixer of maiden's tears. Also, Aisia discovers Kotori's hidden feelings for Jun'ichi. However, Kotori appears to hesitate to reveal her feelings to him. At night, she takes a swim in the ocean by herself.
15	"Delivering a Singing Voice"; Transliteration: "Utagoe o todoke ni" (Japanese: 歌声を届けに)	October 8, 2005
Aisia bewildered about the feelings of love that others endure for Jun'ichi. She tries to push Kotori closer to Jun'ichi when having her make dinner for them; though it wasn't to her content. Tonight everybody goes to a summer festival. Jun'ichi goes to invite Kotori since she's gloomy from earlier, and they go to the festival and have fun. Kotori accepts she won't have Jun'ichi to herself and that she is happy with the way things are. This concludes the end of Jun'ichi's Support Team.
16	"Blossoming Memories"; Transliteration: "Mebaeta omoi" (Japanese: 芽生えた想い)	October 15, 2005
Aisia develops feelings of rivalry towards Nemu, and of affection towards Jun'ichi. Still perplex with love she visits the cherry blossom tree; Misaki arrives and discuss knowing how the way things are for the best or not. Throughout the day, Aisia took meetings with Tamaki, Nanako, the Mizukoshi sisters, and Miharu and Alice whom all give the same kind of answer. Aisia takes a walk with Jun'ichi following the sunset.
17	"Nemu and Jun'ichi"; Transliteration: "Nemu to Jun'ichi" (Japanese: 音夢と純一)	October 22, 2005
Aisia tries to compete with Nemu in looking after Jun'ichi (to no avail), and accompanies them on a date. She begins to understand how much Nemu cares for him, but is confused by his seeming lack of understanding or gratitude. Nemu explains it's only natural for a relative to be thankful to one another even if they don't show their gratitude properly.
18	"A Mirage the Color of Cherry Blossoms"; Transliteration: "Sakurairo no shinkirō" (Japanese: 桜色の蜃気楼)	October 29, 2005
A blond-haired, voluptuous young woman with twin ponytails is spotted on the island. Thinking that "Sakura" has returned, the Asakuras, and their friends follow Utamaru to see if he leads them to her. Jun'ichi and Nemu found Sakura on a flower hill, and cherish their reunion. Aisia is excited when she learns that Sakura is related to Grandma Yoshino as well.
19	"Sakura's Words"; Transliteration: "Sakura no kotoba" (Japanese: さくらの言葉)	November 5, 2005
After a welcoming party for Sakura, the Asakuras and their friends repair the neglected Yoshino house. Sakura shoots down Aisia's hopes of magic lessons, and she attempts to explain the consequences of magic. The cherry blossom tree that once helped make people happy on Hatsune-Jima, by answering a person's pure feelings, began to create sadness on the island and had to be withered away after Sakura's wish 2 years ago.
20	"The Season That Won't Return"; Transliteration: "Modoranai kisetsu" (Japanese: 戻らない季節)	November 12, 2005
Confused by Sakura's rejection, Aisia asks Jun'ichi seriously about what happened two years ago. He refuses to tell her (the incident when Nemu had become ill because of the cherry tree's side effects) entirely. Meanwhile, Sakura remarks a story to Jun'ichi how Grandma Yoshino met a woman at a magic academy in London. Aisia wonders around till she finds Kotori. Kotori reveals the 'telepathic ability' that she once had and is fine without it now, as so she can be her true self, and the feelings that Jun'ichi and Nemu held for each other for a long time. Aisia still can't believe the way things are, and she decides to see if everyone's desire can come true through the magical cherry blossom tree again.
21	"Two Magicians"; Transliteration: "Futari no mahōtsukai" (Japanese: 二人の魔法使い)	November 19, 2005
Sakura talks Aisia out of trying to revive the cherry blossom tree, vitally remove the magic is so it would remain wither, and magic doesn't always solve everyone's difficulties. She also theorizes that Aisia's grandmother had to change locations in so people won't constantly indulge to magic for foolish desires. At home, Sakura speaks that she okay with her feelings and Jun'ichi's decision, but Aisia questions her desire to be with Jun'ichi, believing her to be dishonest, since Sakura hasn't age due to her own unrequited love for Jun'ichi.
22	"Everyone's Time"; Transliteration: "Minna no jikan" (Japanese: みんなの時間)	November 26, 2005
With summer vacation ended everyone goes back to school, Sakura, including Moe and Nemu wear a school uniform as special students today. Sakura and the other girls try to get Nemu and Jun'ichi together during the midsummer school day. At night, Suginami and Kanae help set up a ghostly act to persuade Nemu holding onto Jun'ichi till they reach the top spot of a nice view of shooting stars. Aisia once again desperately attempts to revive the cherry blossom tree. A single new flower is shown growing on a branch.
23	"The Summer of Silence"; Transliteration: "Chinmoku no natsu" (Japanese: 沈黙の夏)	December 3, 2005
Jun'ichi organizes a study session to help finish his neglected homework, but the other girls are seemingly forgetting that he and Nemu are more than siblings, and even they begin to doubt their relationship. They had brought a pair of watches but soon can't remember why did they.
24	"Vow"; Transliteration: "Chikai" (Japanese: 誓い)	December 10, 2005
Kotori felt something strange is happening so she went to see Sakura. Sakura, who hadn't seen Jun'ichi or the girls for a day, suddenly discovers the magical cherry blossom tree revived! The memories of Nemu and Jun'ichi as lovers are being erased because of Aisia's wish for everyone to share their feelings to Jun'ichi. Once the boys are now aware of this revelation, Nemu runs back to Jun'ichi, and they share a kiss under the cherry blossom tree as sakura flowers blossom all over the island.
25	"Da Capo" (Japanese: ダ·カーポ)	December 17, 2005
Like a rewound clock, life becomes a semblance of what it was before Jun'ichi and Nemu became lovers. Sakura confronts Aisia's world with a warning that everyone's desired feelings cannot be granted at the same time (since polygamy is not a natural law).
26	"The Bells of Happiness"; Transliteration: "Shiawase no Kane" (Japanese: 幸せの鐘)	December 24, 2005
Although everyone now has a fair chance of being with Jun'ichi, he and Nemu become depressed. Suginami and Kotori bring the two back together to challenge this reality. Nemu lets Jun'ichi read her letters, and Aisia realizes the stubborn power of the cherry blossom tree. In the end, Aisia finally truly understanding the feelings of those around her, uses her magic to once again withers the cherry blossom tree and restore everyone's memories, she then disappears after saying goodbye to Jun'ichi. By the end of the year, Nemu and Jun'ichi get married and a mysterious girl catches Nemu's bouquet of flowers. After throwing it in the air and using magic to split it into enough bouquets for all the girls, she walks away, however Jun'ichi calls to her and she is revealed to be Aisia who joyfully turns around and runs to him. Finally everyone is happy in Hatsune-Jima.

=== Da Capo If ===
Da Capo: If, is a two episode alternative timeline of the second season, where Jun'ichi Asakura returned Kotori Shirakawa's feelings.

No.	Title	Original release date
1	TBA	December 25, 2008
The episode begins with a short scene between Kotori and her older sister, Koyomi – the night before a wedding was to take place. Koyomi congratulates her, stating that happiness would surely come to Kotori's life with "him" by her side. Kotori thanks her sister for remaining at her side up until now. Just about a year after Nemu's death (the cause being unknown), everyone has been helping Jun'ichi manage his life in Nemu's absence. Kotori, in particular, has been spending most of the day with him; they go to school and back together and she also cooks for him every day. Almost kissing at a beach, Jun'ichi begins to question his feelings for Kotori, though is also questioning whether he is betraying Nemu's feelings or not. The following day, Jun'ichi visits Nemu's grave, and later decides to clean up Nemu's room. Jun'ichi and his friends reminisce the past when Nemu was still alive, leaving Kotori in confusion. She questions Jun'ichi of his motives, and he responds that it was necessary to remove the remaining imprint of Nemu from the world, or otherwise, he cannot move on. Bewildered, Kotori hastily leaves the house, Jun'ichi following suit. Both confront each other at the front, where Kotori explains that something was not right in his motives. Jun'ichi attempts to confess his love to Kotori, and knowing what he was about to do, she rejects it, despite not hearing it fully, and apologizes.
2	TBA	March 25, 2009
After Kotori refused to accept Jun'ichi's confession, complications arise and Jun'ichi reflects on his motives to clean Nemu's room. Kotori continues to question her feelings in confusion as to why she could not bear to accept Jun'ichi's feelings, thus continuing to distance from him. Soon, not only has depression struck both, but it arises their friends' concern on their well-being, tracing the cause back to Jun'ichi's decision to clean up. Kotori continues to ponder in the park, when she was approached by Koyomi. Not knowing what to do, Kotori asks for advice, and is questioned in return as to why she loved Jun'ichi in the first place. Jun'ichi is confronted by Sakura, who hastily returned to the house, and questions further his motives, considering them as cruel and futile, and the most being, Kotori would not have asked for such a thing from him. Jun'ichi resolves his motives, and decides to go and look for Kotori. Meeting upon the dead cherry blossom tree, both are resolved and Jun'ichi firmly confesses to Kotori, which she happily accepts, followed by a kiss. A marriage follows, and a reunion has taken place at the school. Jun'ichi and Kotori begin to pass through the lush green row of sakura trees, when under Nemu's wish for their happiness, reverts all of the sakura trees in Hatsunejima to their pink blossoms.
