= List of Rumbling Hearts episodes =

The Rumbling Hearts animated television series is based on the visual novel by the Japanese software company âge. The episodes, produced by animation studio Studio Fantasia, are directed by Tetsuya Watanabe, with character designs by Yoko Kikuchi. The story follows the main character Takayuki Narumi, and his relationships with his schoolmates Haruka Suzumiya and Mitsuki Hayase.

Fourteen episodes were produced for the Rumbling Hearts series, broadcast between October 2003 and January 2004. They were released by Media Factory in Japan as a set of seven DVD collections between February and August 2004, with each DVD containing two episodes. The series was later released as a DVD box set in December 2007, and as a Blu-ray box-set in February 2012. Funimation licensed, localized and distributed the series in three volumes with an English dub, released between December 2006 and March 2007. A complete box set was released in August 2007, while a complete series collection was released in August 2008.

An OVA series titled Kimi ga Nozomu Eien ~Next Season~, produced by Brain's Base and directed by Hideki Takayama, was released in four editions between December 2007 and December 2008, featuring most of the same cast but following an alternate retelling to the series.

== Rumbling Hearts ==
The first series, consisting of fourteen episodes and produced by Studio Fantasia aired between October 5, 2003, and January 4, 2004, on Chiba TV and a number of other stations. They were released by Media Factory in Japan as a set of seven DVD collections between February and August 2004, with each DVD containing two episodes. A complete box set was released in August 2007, while a complete series collection was released in August 2008.

Funimation licensed, localized and distributed the series in three volumes with an English dub, released between December 2006 and March 2007. A complete box set was released in August 2007, while a complete series collection was released in August 2008.

The anime has two main theme songs, the opening theme "Precious Memories", and the ending theme Hoshizora no Waltz (星空のワルツ, The Waltz of the Starry Sky), which are both sung by Haruka's voice actress Minami Kuribayashi. Two additional songs by Kuribayashi were used, "Rumbling Hearts", used as the ending theme of episode 2, and "Nemuri Hime", which was used as an insert song. The ending theme for episode 14 is "Kimi ga Nozomu Eien" by MEGUMI.

No.	Title	Original release date
1	"Friends to Lovers"; Transliteration: "Dai Ichi Wa" (Japanese: 第一話)	October 5, 2003
2	"Waiting"; Transliteration: "Dai Ni Wa" (Japanese: 第二話)	October 12, 2003
3	"Moving On"; Transliteration: "Dai San Wa" (Japanese: 第三話)	October 19, 2003
4	"Betrayed by Love"; Transliteration: "Dai Yon Wa" (Japanese: 第四話)	October 26, 2003
5	"Lead Astray"; Transliteration: "Dai Go Wa" (Japanese: 第五話)	November 2, 2003
6	"Wishing"; Transliteration: "Dai Roku Wa" (Japanese: 第六話)	November 9, 2003
7	"Always Second Thoughts"; Transliteration: "Dai Nana Wa" (Japanese: 第七話)	November 17, 2003
8	"Old Scars are New"; Transliteration: "Dai Hachi Wa" (Japanese: 第八話)	November 23, 2003
9	"Unraveling"; Transliteration: "Dai Kyū Wa" (Japanese: 第九話)	November 30, 2003
10	"Impulses"; Transliteration: "Dai Jū Wa" (Japanese: 第十話)	December 7, 2003
11	"Where the Blame Lies"; Transliteration: "Dai Jū-ichi Wa" (Japanese: 第十一話)	December 14, 2003
12	"Friends to Enemies"; Transliteration: "Dai Jū-ni Wa" (Japanese: 第十二話)	December 21, 2003
13	"The Past Will Catch Up"; Transliteration: "Dai Jū-san Wa" (Japanese: 第十三話)	December 28, 2003
14	"Mayauru's Gift"; Transliteration: "Saishū Wa" (Japanese: 最終話)	January 4, 2004

== Kimi ga Nozomu Eien ~Next Season~ ==
A four-episode OVA titled Kimi ga Nozomu Eien ~Next Season~ was announced on August 25, 2006. The original video animation follows Haruka's route, in contrast to the TV series' modified version of Mitsuki's ending. The OVA, produced by the Japanese animation studio Brain's Base and distributed by Bandai Visual was released between December 21, 2007, and December 19, 2008, . The special editions contain a bonus CD soundtrack with each DVD and a different cover artwork. The OVA's first ending theme is "Next Season" while its second ending theme is "Eternity", which also serves as the opening theme of the first and second OVAs. Both songs are sung by Minami Kuribayashi.

No.	Original release date
1	December 21, 2007
2	March 25, 2008
3	June 25, 2008
4	December 19, 2008

== Ayumayu Gekijou ==
A comedy ONA titled Ayumayu Gekijou that was broadcast from September to December 2006 on Kiminozo Radio's homepage with four episodes, and the remaining three episodes were included in the DVD, which was released in February 2007. The main characters are SD versions of Ayu and Mayu and various other characters from Kimi ga Nozomu Eien and Muv-Luv. The series contains many references to Muv-Luv (for example, in the second episode, Ayu uses an S-11 SDS and Haruka is turned into a 00 Unit) and the fourth episode is little more than a parody of Muv-Luv Alternative. The series' main theme is "Koi no Bakudan Deito" (恋の爆弾でいと) by UYAMUYA, while the song "Carry On" by Masaaki Endou is used as an insert song.

No.	Title	Original release date
1	Transliteration: "Hakuchuu no Shikaku... sa." (Japanese: 白昼の死角...さ。)	September 29, 2006
2	Transliteration: "Furikaereba Yatsu ga Iru... sa." (Japanese: 振り返れば奴がいる...さ。)	October 27, 2006
3	Transliteration: "Ari yo Saraba... sa." (Japanese: アリよさらば...さ。)	November 24, 2006
4	Transliteration: "Ou-sama no Resutoran... sa." (Japanese: 王様のレストラン...さ。)	December 29, 2006
5	Transliteration: "Oni no Sumika... sa." (Japanese: 鬼の棲家...さ。)	February 23, 2007 (DVD)
6	Transliteration: "Danjo 7 nin Natsu Monogatari... sa." (Japanese: 男女7人夏物語...さ。)	February 23, 2007 (DVD)
7	"Special Episode"; Transliteration: "Supesharu Episōdo" (Japanese: スペシャルエピソード)	February 23, 2007 (DVD)
