= Jibba Jabba =

British children's television series

- Created by: Elizabeth Todd
- Voices of: Andy Spooner
- Opening theme: John Turner
- Country of origin: United Kingdom
- Original language: English
- No. of episodes: 32

Production
- Producers: Myke Crosby; Amelia Johnson
- Running time: 5–10 minutes
- Production company: Living TV Group for Sky plc

Original release
- Network: Tiny Living
- Release: 2003

Jibba Jabba is a British pre-school television series which aired on the children's block Tiny Living on the channel Living TV.

The series is a computer animation series consisting of 32 five-minute episodes. It centers around two friends, 'Mo' and 'Max'. In each episode one character approaches a tree-house containing a dressing up box for Mo or Max to become a part of the story told in the episode. The stories told would often be a reenactment of a famous fairy tale or rhyme. Each episode included audience participation from children, calling out or responding. The series was presented and narrated by a puppet called 'Dog', as seen on sister show Tiny and Crew. Dog also provided in-vision presentation for the channel's Tiny Living strand.
