= List of Shadow Star episodes =

Shadow Star, known in Japan as Narutaru (Japanese: なるたる), is a Japanese manga series written and illustrated by Mohiro Kitoh. The 13-episode anime adaptation was broadcast on the Japanese television station Kids Station from July 8 to September 30, 2003. (Note: Shadow Star aired on Kids Station on Monday 24:00, effectively Tuesday at 12:00 a.m. JST.) The anime was licensed by Central Park Media for North America in 2004, under the title Shadow Star Narutaru. It was featured on Comcast's Anime Selects, alongside other Central Park Media titles. In October 2007, it was part of the initial lineup of 21 titles run on the Illusion on-Demand television network. Central Park Media released the series under their "U.S. Manga Corps" line in 2005 on four DVDs, and later re-released the DVDs in a box set in July 2006. Central Park Media filed for bankruptcy in 2009, and the DVDs have since been out of print.

== Episodes ==
No.	Title	Original release date
1	"It's a Star Shape"; Transliteration: "Sore wa Hoshi no Katachi" (Japanese: それは星のカタチ)	July 8, 2003
While on a seemingly peaceful summer vacation trip to her grandparents' home on a small island, energetic 11-year-old Shiina Tamai nearly drowns in an ocean swimming race. Before blacking out, she discovers a strange alien starfish that brings her back to shore. She befriends the creature, naming it Hoshimaru and taking it back to the city with her. What Shiina doesn't know is that her cute pet may end up doing her more harm than help.
2	"Catastrophe During the Daytime"; Transliteration: "Wazawai wa Hikari no Uchi" (Japanese: 災いは光の内)	July 15, 2003
Back home from the island, Shiina sets out to her weekly kendo class. While practicing, she meets a painfully shy new girl named Akira Sakura. Shiina comforts the nervous junior high schooler, who flees the dojo after a mere glimpse of Hoshimaru (disguised as a quirky backpack). Perplexed Shiina begins to wonder about what may have driven Akira off, without considering the deadly secret and supernatural similarities she and the insecure teenager really have in common.
3	"The First Black One"; Transliteration: "Kuro no Ichigō" (Japanese: 黒の1号)	July 22, 2003
Fast friends Shiina and Akira, along with their shape-shifting alien pals Hoshimaru and Ensof, join together and try to figure out the mystery behind the recent attacks on Shiina's father's aviation company. In a lush forest they find the culprit - a teenage boy named Tomonori Komori with command over a deadly sword-shaped "shadow dragon". But picking off jet pilots is only the beginning of his twisted schemes, and murdering the two meddling heroines is his next goal.
4	"The Shadow of a Child's Footprint"; Transliteration: "Kage wa Shōnen no Hohaba de" (Japanese: 影は少年の歩幅で)	July 29, 2003
Summer vacation is over and school's starting up again. But Shiina is still haunted by her battle with the boy Komori, and the images of his bloody death are ripe in her mind. While facing a degree of doubt about whether or not he's really gone, she now has to deal with her mother's criticism about her poor grades. However, this troubling lecture did not stop Shiina from her birthday, turning 12. Meanwhile, a few evil teenage dragon bearers begin plotting their next moves.
5	"An Angel's Game"; Transliteration: "Tenshi no Oyūgi" (Japanese: 天使のお遊戯)	August 5, 2003
While on a simple test flight, Shiina's father Shunji's fighter jet encounters a new dragon that resembles an angel. But he learns never to judge a book by its cover as the wide-eyed alien open fires at him and his comrades with catastrophic amounts of hidden weaponry. Who could possibly be controlling this new force? What is their motive? After her dad goes missing, Shiina is more determined than ever to find out. But once he is found, her cruel mother Misono Tamai pays him a visit, and she's interested in nothing but giving all the juicy details over to the trigger-happy Japanese government.
6	"His Words Were True"; Transliteration: "Kare no Kotoba wa Shinjitsu" (Japanese: 彼の言葉は真実)	August 12, 2003
After Akira gets a mysterious note delivered by an anonymous boy, she reunites with Shiina and the latter mentions a teenage boy who she suspects has something to do with the dragons and the letter. They find him and decide to chase him down, but once they arrive at his spacious warehouse home, they may discover a bit more than they were prepared for. Afterwards Akira sees a television news report about the supposed "disappearance" of Komori and, knowing the truth about his death, decides to leave a simple bouquet outside his house. While there she meets Naozumi Sudo, a calm friend of Komori's who seems very eager to drive her home and protect her from the police cars chasing after him. But why is he being chased?
7	"The Scent of Flowers to Those Who Fight and Those Who Die"; Transliteration: "Tatakau Mono ni Hana no Kaori o, Soshite Shinu Mono ni" (Japanese: 戦う者に華の芳を、そして死ぬ者に)	August 19, 2003
On the way to school, Akira is kidnapped by a dragon that resembles a flower. Shiina and Hoshimaru set out to rescue their friend after finding Akira's dragonchild Ensof on their doorstep. But the girls soon get caught in a trap set up by a group of evil bearers determined to avenge their dead ally Komori. Led by Sudo, laid-back Bungo Takano and stubborn Satomi Ozawa - plus apparent bystander Mamiko Kuri who Sudo claims has a dragon - target the Japanese air force officials who are testing ammo nearby. It is up to Shiina and Akira to stop their three destructive dragons from achieving this goal and keep their own skins in the process.
8	"Don't Close Your Eyes"; Transliteration: "Me o Tojiru na" (Japanese: 目を閉じるな)	August 26, 2003
Despite the girls' best efforts, all of their hope to stop the evil dragon bearers' scheme seems hopeless. They have both been arrested by the air force officials and taken into a tent for questioning. But who should show up but Takeo Tsurumaru, the boy Shiina and Akira chased down in episode 6? And indeed he does, riding on his roommate Norio Koga's menacing yellow dragon. Shiina is immediately suspicious but Tsurumaru claims that he isn't the writer of the letter Akira got, nor is he the bearer of any of the evil dragons that may have been spotted. But now that he seems like a friendly force, will his and Norio's help be enough to stop Sudo's group from wiping thousands of lives off the face of the earth?
9	"A Fish's Life, a Human's Life"; Transliteration: "Sakana no Inochi, Hito no Inochi" (Japanese: 魚の命、人の命)	September 2, 2003
The aftermath of the last two episodes seems to have died down. A girl appears at Tsurumaru's place, and he will have to squirm his way out of her complaints. When Shiina walks in moments later, she demands them to teach her how to link with Hoshimaru. Tsurumaru and Norio say they do not know, but Shiina is more determined than ever to communicate with her creature, and it seems like nothing will stop her, for better or worse. Later, to relax, Shiina and Akira decide to take a peaceful fishing trip with Sudo. They still haven't the slightest idea that he is organizing the teenagers behind all the recent dragon attacks, but when driving home from their fun day off, Akira may be faced with a threatening choice sooner than anyone thought.
10	"Now I Can Make It Because of You"; Transliteration: "Ima, Anata no Tame ni Dekiru Koto" (Japanese: 今、あなたのためにできること)	September 9, 2003
Desperate to be able to link with Hoshimaru like all of the other dragon bearers, Shiina begins training with him late at night above Tokyo Bay. Once she seems to think it's hopeless, she meets a girl named Jyun Ezumi riding on a dragon shaped like a broomstick. With Jun, Shiina quickly learns quite a bit about the future of all who possess a dragon, and doesn't consider how this fascinating knowledge will show itself again. Nearby, the tragic story of three separated friends begins to conclude, but will Shiina have anything to do with it?
11	"The Invisible Ground Level"; Transliteration: "Mienai Chihei" (Japanese: 見えない地平)	September 16, 2003
Akira finally goes back to school after countless days of skipping or interruptions. She is by no means welcomed, and when she collapses in the middle of gym class and is escorted to the nurses' office by a boy with a huge crush on her, she just might be willing to throw away her dignity and sanity for a chance to feel loved. Over at the neighboring elementary school, Shiina's close friend Hiroko Kaizuka is being tormented by bullies due to her perfect test grades. But why is Hiroko staying silent about it? And will Shiina find out before it's too late?
12	"My Eyes Are the Victim's Eyes, My Hands Are the Assailant's Hands"; Transliteration: "Watashi no Me wa Higaisha no Me, Watashi no Te wa Kagaisha no Te" (Japanese: わたしの目は被害者の目、わたしの手は加害者の手)	September 23, 2003
After being told that she is forbidden to talk to Shiina, her only friend, in a frenzied turn of events Hiroko unleashes her dragon child into the world. All sense of judgment clouded by her anger, Hiroko uses her hulking beast to take revenge - on her overbearing parents, on the bullies who made her life hell, and perhaps even all of mankind.
13	"That With Which We Bestow Upon the Children of the Future"; Transliteration: "Mirai no Kodomo-tachi e Okuru" (Japanese: 未来の子ども達へ贈る)	September 30, 2003
Shiina must work with Hoshimaru to shelter everyone she loves from the wrath of her psychotic friend Hiroko. It will take all of her strength to save them, and reality may not turn out as perfect as Shiina wishes. Is there any hope to stop Hiroko's madness?
