= List of How a Realist Hero Rebuilt the Kingdom episodes =

How a Realist Hero Rebuilt the Kingdom is an anime television series adaptation based on the light novel series of the same title written by Dojyomaru and illustrated by Fuyuyuki. It was announced by Overlap on April 17, 2020. The series was animated by J.C.Staff and directed by Takashi Watanabe, with Gō Zappa and Hiroshi Ōnogi penning the scripts, Mai Otsuka designing the characters, and Akiyuki Tateyama composing the series' music. The first half aired from July 4 to September 26, 2021, on Tokyo MX and BS11. (Note: Tokyo MX listed the series premiere at 25:30 on July 3, 2021 (first half) and January 8, 2022 (second half), which is effectively July 4 and January 9 at 1:30 a.m. JST.) The first half ran for 13 episodes. The second half aired from January 9 to April 3, 2022. The first opening theme song, "Hello Horizon", was performed by Inori Minase, while the first ending theme song, "Kazanear", was performed by Aimi. The second opening theme song is "Real-Eyes" by Inori Minase, while the second ending theme song is "Lights" by Aimi.

Funimation licensed the series outside of Asia. On July 30, 2021, Funimation announced the series would receive an English dub, which premiered the following day. Following Sony's acquisition of Crunchyroll, the series was moved to Crunchyroll. Mighty Media licensed the series in Southeast Asia and streamed it on iQIYI and Bilibili and also aired on Animax on March 9, 2022.

== Episodes ==
No.	Title (Note: All English titles are taken from Funimation.)	Directed by (Note: Information is taken from the ending credits of each episode.)	Written by	Storyboarded by	Original release date
Part 1
1	"First Begin with a Hero"; Transliteration: "Mazu Yūsha Yori Hajimeyo" (Japanese: まず勇者より始めよ)	Shūji Miyazaki	Gō Zappa	Takashi Watanabe	July 4, 2021
University student Kazuya Souma is suddenly summoned as a hero to the kingdom of Elfrieden, which is facing a number of crises, both foreign and domestic. Souma confers with the king and prime minister, after which the king makes a stunning announcement: he is stepping down and passing the throne to Souma, who is to be engaged to his daughter.
2	"If You Possess an Aptitude, We'll Make Use of It"; Transliteration: "Tada Sai Araba Mochiiru" (Japanese: ただ才あらば用いる)	Shigeki Awai	Gō Zappa	Kōichi Takada	July 11, 2021
Souma is checked for any magical powers, and discovers that he has a special ability called "Living Poltergeist". He puts his results to use with the administrative paperwork. Hoping to recruit more competent personnel for his staff, Souma sends out a nationwide broadcast offering prizes to the most talented in the land.
3	"Let Not Me Be a Loyal Minister"; Transliteration: "Shin o Shite Chūshin Tara Shimu Koto Nakare" (Japanese: 臣をして忠臣たらしむことなかれ)	Akira Tanaka	Gō Zappa	Kōhei Hatano	July 18, 2021
The results of the talent search are in, and the kingdom holds a recognition and award ceremony for the winners. Five uniquely talented individuals: Aisha Udgard, Juna Doma, Tomoe Inui, Hakuya Kwonmin, and Poncho Panacotta, come before Souma to demonstrate their skills, and find a place for themselves within his royal court.
4	"The Forefinger Twitches"; Transliteration: "Shokushi, Ugoku" (Japanese: 食指、動く)	Takeshi Tomita; Yūki Morita	Gō Zappa	Takashi Watanabe	July 25, 2021
After Souma realizes the true gravity of Tomoe's ability, he ensures that it remains a secret, and that she is kept safe. Juna and Poncho host a program that shows how to prepare readily-available but unconventional ingredients during the food shortage.
5	"Well Fed, Well Regarded"; Transliteration: "Ishoku Tatte, Eijoku o Shiru" (Japanese: 衣食足って、栄辱を知る)	Yūsuke Onoda	Gō Zappa	Hitoyuki Matsui	August 1, 2021
Juna and Poncho close out their cooking show with their take on udon noodles. Marx steps down as prime minister, and as Hakuya fills the vacancy, he insists that Souma get some rest. Souma, Liscia Elfrieden, and Aisha take a tour of the castle town incognito.
6	"The Wise Man Never Forsaketh an Advantage"; Transliteration: "Chisha wa Toki ni Somuite Ri o Sutezu" (Japanese: 智者は時にそむいて利を捨てず)	Naoki Horiuchi	Gō Zappa	Takaaki Ishiyama	August 8, 2021
While at Lorelei, Souma overhears two soldiers arguing about whether to side with or against the new king. Hakuya reviews the political situation concerning the neighboring lands with the king. Souma and Liscia discuss the nature of their engagement.
7	"Thus Saith the Elder"; Transliteration: "Korō, Iwaku" (Japanese: 古老、曰く)	Akira Tanaka	Gō Zappa	Tsuneo Tominaga	August 15, 2021
Souma dispatches his magically-controlled mascot warrior to join an adventurer party. After securing funding with his team of accountants, Souma sets out to build a new port city and network of roads, but runs into opposition from the local residents who warn him of the dangers of doing this.
8	"The Forest in Labour"; Transliteration: "Mori, Meidō su" (Japanese: 森、鳴動す)	Shigeru Fukase	Gō Zappa	Kunihisa Sugishima	August 22, 2021
Kaede Foxia leads an engineering corps, including Halbert Magna, in constructing a road. As the work detail receives a royal inspection from Souma and Liscia, an urgent message from Aisha's father arrives, informing them of a natural disaster in their homeland.
9	"Contrary to Wishes"; Transliteration: "Tateyoko, Narazu" (Japanese: 縦横、成らず)	Shigeki Awai	Hiroshi Ōnogi	Yoshiaki Iwasaki	August 29, 2021
The Three Dukes meet to discuss what to do about King Souma. In Amidonia, Gaius Amidonia receives word from Georg Carmine accepting his aid, and prepares to invade Elfrieden over the objections of his finance minister. Souma delivers his ultimatum to the Three Dukes, but only Excel Walter allies with him.
10	"No Place of Joy Hath a Soldier"; Transliteration: "Hei wa Tanoshimu Tokoro ni Arazarunari" (Japanese: 兵は楽しむ所に非ざるなり)	Akira Tanaka; Shigeki Awai	Hiroshi Ōnogi	Kiyotaka Ōhata	September 5, 2021
Gaius leads an invasion force from Amidonia into the kingdom and lays siege to the city of Altomura. Meanwhile, in Randel, the Forbidden Army constructs a fort from which they engage Georg's forces, while Red Dragon City receives its own surprise attack.
11	"Sacrifice the Plum Tree to Preserve the Peach Tree"; Transliteration: "Ridai Tōkyō" (Japanese: 李代桃僵)	Akira Tanaka; Hiroyuki Okuno	Hiroshi Ōnogi	Takashi Watanabe; Hitoyuki Matsui	September 12, 2021
Souma and his entourage confront Castor Vargas in his castle, eventually defeating and enslaving him and his daughter, Carla, before hurrying off to Randel to regroup with the Forbidden Army. A stunning truth about Georg is revealed by Glaive Magna, leading to a dramatic turn of events with Gaius and his forces at Altomura.
12	"When You Surround an Army, Leave an Outlet Free"; Transliteration: "Ishi ni wa Kanarazu Hiraku" (Japanese: 囲師には必ず闕く)	Yūsuke Onoda	Hiroshi Ōnogi	Kunihisa Sugishima	September 19, 2021
Under Gaius's command, the Amidonian army launches a full-scale attack to retake Van, but Souma and his forces, accompanied by the enslaved Carla, move to stop them. In the aftermath of the war, there are serious consequences to be faced and plans for reconciliation to be put into action.
13	"To Fight and Conquer in All Our Battles Is Not Supreme Excellence"; Transliteration: "Hyakusen Hyakushō wa Zen no Zen Naru Mono ni Arazu" (Japanese: 百戦百勝は善の善なる者に非ず)	Naoki Horiuchi	Hiroshi Ōnogi	Takashi Watanabe	September 26, 2021
Jeanne Euphoria of the Gran Chaos Empire is sent to Van to deal with the occupation. Roroa Amidonia observes the newfound freedom of the citizens of Van. Poncho locates a source of food for the impoverished citizens. Souma, Juna, and Tomoe enjoy a day off together.
Part 2
14	"Amidonia in a Lion's Skin"; Transliteration: "Tora no I o Karu Amidonia" (Japanese: 虎の威を借るアミドニア)	Shigeki Awai	Hiroshi Ōnogi	Hitoyuki Matsui	January 9, 2022
Julius Amidonia, the son of Gaius, attempts to reclaim his former territory of Van from Souma, backed by the authority of the Gran Chaos Empire. The power to negotiate is give to Jeanne Euphoria, younger sister of Empress Maria Euphoria.
15	"Becoming Good Friends Who Never Offend"; Transliteration: "Bakugyaku no Tomo to Naru" (Japanese: 莫逆の友と為る)	Yuki Kanazawa	Hiroshi Ōnogi	Kunihisa Sugishima	January 16, 2022
Jeanne's negotiations continue. These negotiations are no longer in the hands of Julius, but wholly a matter for the Gran Chaos Empire and the Kingdom of Elfrieden. Further, Jeanne sees a new future and a new world in Souma.
16	"Tyranny Is More Terrible than Tigers"; Transliteration: "Kasei wa Tora yori mo Takeshi" (Japanese: 苛政は寅よりも猛し)	Nozomu Kamiya	Hiroshi Ōnogi	Shinji Itadaki	January 23, 2022
Van is returned to Julius as a result of the mediation of the Gran Chaos Empire, in exchange for a great deal of reparation costs. Souma returns to the Kingdom of Elfrieden, where many other problems yet remain.
17	"A Warrior Will Die for One Who Understands Him"; Transliteration: "Shi wa Onore o Shiru Mono no Tame ni Shisu" (Japanese: 士は己を知る者の為に死す)	Kōhei Hatano; Kōzō Kaihō	Hiroshi Ōnogi	Shinji Itadaki	January 30, 2022
Souma is victorious in both the Elfrieden civil war and the battle against Amidonia. However, his victory was won as a result of the devotion of a man named Georg. Still, the law is the law, and Souma must pass down a harsh judgement against Georg.
18	"Seeing Snake Shadows in Every Cup"; Transliteration: "Haichū no Daei" (Japanese: 杯中の蛇影)	Shigeki Awai	Hiroshi Ōnogi	Kunihisa Sugishima	February 6, 2022
Weathering a number of problems, Souma more or less finishes dealing with the aftermath of the war. However, he was set upon by an inexplicable anxiety, the distress and pressure only felt by those in authority. It was not something he could bear alone.
19	"Strike While the Iron Is Hot"; Transliteration: "Kika Okubeshi" (Japanese: 奇貨おくべし)	Kazunobu Shimizu	Hiroshi Ōnogi	Shinji Itadaki	February 13, 2022
Royal Guard Captain Ludwin Arcs' childhood friend, Genia Maxwell, is a rare breed of mad scientist. Her inventions leave even Souma, who comes from a world of science and technology, in astonishment. Souma then convinces Ludwin to express his feelings to Genia.
20	"Aping the Frown of Beauty"; Transliteration: "Seishi no Hisomi ni Narau" (Japanese: ⻄施のひそみにならう)	Yuki Kanazawa	Hiroshi Ōnogi	Hitoyuki Matsui	February 20, 2022
With Van, the capital of Amidonia, returned to Julius, so too returns the oppressive rule of the government. The people's dissatisfaction increases day by day, until finally they end up revolting. Julius' sister, Roroa, then comes before Souma and requests to be his fiancée.
21	"Using Shrimp As Bait to Catch Sea Bream, but Instead Catching a Shark"; Transliteration: "Ebi de Tai o Tsurō to Shitara Same ga Kakatta" (Japanese: 蝦で鯛を釣ろうとしたら鮫が掛かった)	Shigeki Awai	Hiroshi Ōnogi	Iku Suzuki	February 27, 2022
Roroa's arrival further complicates the situation between Amidonia and the Kingdom of Frieden. It was an outcome not even Souma had anticipated. In response, a conference between Grand Chaos Empire Empress Maria Euphoria and Souma must be convened.
22	"A Man without Learning Is Unwise; A Man without Wisdom Is a Fool"; Transliteration: "Hito Manabazareba Tomo Nashi, Tomo Nakisha wa Gujin Nari" (Japanese: 人学ばざれば智なし、智なき者は愚人なり)	Mizuki Sasaki	Hiroshi Ōnogi	Shinji Itadaki	March 6, 2022
An unusual Friedonian slave trader named Ginger Camus gives his slaves clean clothes and enough to eat, as well as providing them with an education, little knowing that this will eventually end up rocking the kingdom.
23	"Gargling and Hand Washing Are the Basis of Disease Prevention"; Transliteration: "Ugai Tearai wa Bōeki no Kihon" (Japanese: うがい手洗いは防疫の基本)	Takaaki Ishiyama	Hiroshi Ōnogi	Takaaki Ishiyama	March 13, 2022
Refugees are one of modern society's great challenges, and the Kingdom of Friedonia is no exception. Refugees who had been driven from their lands by invading monsters have gathered outside the walls of the capital and started an encampment.
24	"Away from My Hometown for So Many Years"; Transliteration: "Kakyō ni Ribetsu Shite Saigetsu Ōshi" (Japanese: 家郷に離別して歳月多し)	Shigeki Awai	Hiroshi Ōnogi	Hitoyuki Matsui	March 20, 2022
Souma and the others visit the refugees, where they help an expectant mother with a difficult delivery. The newborn life provides hope and a foundation for the future to the refugees, but not all of them accept the future Souma presents them as some wish to reclaim their homeland.
25	"Know Your Enemy and Know Yourself, and Your Union Shall Not Be Endangered"; Transliteration: "Aite o Shiri, Onore o Shireba Fūfunaka mo Ayaukarazu" (Japanese: 相手を知り、己を知れば夫婦仲も危うからず)	Naoki Horiuchi	Hiroshi Ōnogi	Shinji Itadaki	March 27, 2022
One evening, Excel whispers to the fiancées Liscia, Aisha, Juna, and Roroa that she will teach them how to please Souma, and suddenly commences a "Fiancées' Bridal Course". The secrets of Souma and his fiancées are about to come to light.
26	"Ahead, I See No Ancestors; Behind, I Find No Followers"; Transliteration: "Mae ni Kojin o Mizu, Nochi ni Raisha o Mizu" (Japanese: 前に古人を見ず、後に来者を見ず)	Shigeru Fukase	Hiroshi Ōnogi	Takashi Watanabe	April 3, 2022
On the last night of the year, Souma is called by the previous king, Albert Elfrieden, to speak with him and Queen Elisha. Albert reveals a stunning truth. Once Souma knows everything, he is left with much in his heart to consider.
