= Gō Zappa =

Japanese author and anime screenwriter (born 1970)

Gō Zappa (雑破 業, Zappa Gō; born 1970) is a Japanese author and anime screenwriter. His manga series Chocotto Sister was adapted into an animated television series.

== Manga ==
Zappa is the author of the Chocotto Sister manga series, as well as several other manga such as Tsuiteru Kanojo, Domina no Do, Mahotsukai no Tamagotachi, Yun Yun Paradise, and Yamanko!.

== Novels ==
Zappa has also written a few light novels in his career. He created one for the Chocosis series with MF Bunko J titled Chocotto Sister: Four Seasons. Later with Dengeki Bunko, he created two adaptations for the Please! anime series:

- Mizuho and Kei's Milky Diary.
- The sequel Twins series, Please Twins!.

== Anime ==
=== Television series ===
- series head writer denoted in bold
- **Chocotto Sister** (2006)
- **Myself ; Yourself** (2007)
- **Koihime Musō** (2008)
- **Shin Koihime Musō** (2009)
- **Shin Koihime Musō: Otome Tairan** (2010)
- **Hoshizora e Kakaru Hashi** (2011)
- Sengoku Collection (2012)
- Nakaimo - My Sister Is Among Them! (2012)
- Yu-Gi-Oh!: ZeXal II (2012-2014)
- Leviathan: The Last Defense (2013)
- **Chronicles of the Going Home Club** (2013)
- Maken-Ki! Two (2014)
- Yu-Gi-Oh! Arc-V (2015)
- Tantei Kageki Milky Holmes TD (2015)
- The Idolmaster Cinderella Girls (2015)
- Venus Project -Climax- (2015)
- Valkyrie Drive: Mermaid (2015)
- And You Thought There Is Never a Girl Online? (2016)
- Akiba’s Trip: The Animation (2017)
- Trickster (2017)
- Eromanga Sensei (2017)
- Battle Girl High School (2017)
- **Angel's 3Piece!** (2017)
- **Blend S** (2017)
- **Beatless** (2018)
- Kiratto Pri☆Chan (2018)
- Lupin the 3rd Part V: Misadventures in France (2018)
- Fight League: Gear Gadget Generators (2019)
- **We Never Learn: BOKUBEN** (2019)
- Wise Man’s Grandchild (2019)
- **Kengan Ashura** (2019)
- **Kandagawa Jet Girls** (2019)
- **Ahiru no Sora** (2019-2020)
- **Nekopara** (2020)
- Hatena Illusion (2020)
- D4DJ First Mix (2020)
- **Moriarty the Patriot** (2020)
- Fly Me to the Moon (2020)
- **How a Realist Hero Rebuilt the Kingdom** (2021)

=== OVAs ===
- Koihime Musō (2009)
- Shin Koihime Musō
  - LIVE Revolution (2010)
  - Otome Ryoran Sangokushi Engi (2010)
- We Never Learn: BOKUBEN
  - The Predecessor [X] with Elegance with the Missing Item on the Beach (2019)
  - Church Bells Blessing [X] (2020)
