= Chocotto Sister =

Japanese manga

- First tankōbon volume cover

ちょこッとSister (Chokotto Shisutā)
- Manga
- Written by: Gō Zappa
- Illustrated by: Sakura Takeuchi
- Published by: Hakusensha
- Magazine: Young Animal
- Original run: 2003 – 2007
- Volumes: 8
- Anime television series
- Directed by: Yasuhiro Kuroda
- Written by: Gō Zappa
- Music by: Masara Nishida
- Studio: Nomad
- Original network: Chiba TV
- Original run: 12 July 2006 – 20 December 2006
- Episodes: 24
- icon

Chocotto Sister (Japanese: ちょこッとSister, Hepburn: Chokotto Shisutā) is a Japanese manga series written by Gō Zappa and illustrated by Sakura Takeuchi. It was published in Hakusensha's seinen manga magazine Young Animal from 2003 to 2007, with its chapters collected in eight tankōbon volumes. The series has been adapted into a 24-episode anime television series by Nomad, airing in 2006 and released on eight DVDs.

== Plot ==
The story centers around a Christmas wish made by a young Haruma Kawagoe, who was eagerly anticipating having a baby sister, after his mother suffered a miscarriage followed by a hysterectomy. Several years later, when Haruma is a college student, a woman on a flying motorbike claiming to be Santa Claus delivers his wish, a younger sister. When he remarks that he made his wish a long time ago, "Santa" replies that making a little sister takes a lot more time than just making an android, takes his signature for delivery, and departs. Haruma now has a little sister, who comes with her own instruction manual—a manual for how to be a little sister, that is. When she asks him to name her, he calls her Choko, which refers to anchoko (あんちょこ), the Japanese word for "cheat sheet" or "study guide".

== Characters ==
Choko (ちょこ)
Voiced by: Momoko Saito
Choko is the titular heroine and the little sister that "Santa" delivers to Haruma. She is a sweet and innocent girl who seems to be about 10 years younger than Haruma.
Haruma Kawagoe (川越 はるま, Kawagoe Haruma)
Voiced by: Daisuke Hirakawa
Haruma is the main protagonist and a young man in university. He has a crush on Ayano Sonozaki, the owner of the local flower shop, but is heartbroken after she decides to reunite with her ex-boyfriend.
Chitose Serikawa (芹川 千歳, Serikawa Chitose)
Voiced by: Kaori Mizuhashi
Chitose is the granddaughter of the original landlady. She is a nice, yet somewhat shy and accident-prone young woman without a sense of direction.
Makoto Ashirai (足来 真琴, Ashirai Makoto)
Voiced by: Rika Morinaga
Makoto is young woman who lives in Tsubaki manor, the same building where Haruma, Choko and Yasuoka live.
Yasuoka (安岡)
Voiced by: Kenichi Mochizuki
Haruma's neighbor in Tsubaki manor, Yasuoka is a middle-aged man whose existence Haruma had forgotten about until they meet at a local shrine on the New Year's Day after Choko's appearance. Yasuoka is unemployed and seems to be struggling to find a new job after having lost his wife and daughter about a year before the present.
Ayano Sonozaki (園崎 綾乃, Sonozaki Ayano)
Voiced by: Sayaka Ohara
Ayano is a woman who runs Ciel blue de fleur, a flower shop near Tsubuki's manor.
Kakeru Ishida (石田 駆, Ishida Kakeru)
Voiced by: Yumiko Kobayashi
Kakeru is a rather shy young boy around Choko's age. He saves Choko from a nasty fall and soon develops a strong crush on her. He works at his family's public bath and lives on the premises with three older sisters.
Yurika Hanayamada (華山田 ゆりか, Hanayamada Yurika)
Voiced by: Rie Kugimiya
Yurika is a young girl who seems to be around Choko's age or a little younger. She is from a rich family and lives alone in a big house with only a maid who tends to her since her father is often away on business. Yurika is forced to take on many activities typically associated with the upper classes including: ballet, violin lessons, home schooling with a tutor, and conversational English lessons, all of which she dislikes. Although Yurika initially hated Choko, she comes to care for her as they get to know each other better.
Tamami Marumo (丸茂 珠美, Marumo Tamami)
Voiced by: Yuki Matsuoka
Tamami is a young woman who is Haruma's senpai both at school and in the club he belongs to. Tamami gives the impression of being quite free-spirited. She helps Haruma and other fellow students find part-time jobs, often on short notice, but Haruma is not fond of them as they tend to be "too busy" or not pay as much as he would like.
Landlady (管理人さん, Kanrinin-san)
The original manager of Tsubaki manor, where Haruma, Choko, Yasuoka, and Makoto all live. She has no other name and is a kind-faced widow who is getting on in years and seems quite easygoing.
Kazuya Sawamori (沢森 一也, Sawamori Kazuya)
Voiced by: Ken Narita
Kazuya is the man who was previously engaged to Ayano and used to hold a position as illustrator with a magazine.
"Santa" (サンタ)
Voiced by: Rio Natsuki
Claiming to be Santa Claus, Santa is a rather tough-looking woman who rides a flying motorbike with reindeer antler-style handlebars and who does not have much time for chitchat or objections.
Midori (翠)
Voiced by: Yuka Koyama
Midori is a mature woman whom Choko first encountered in the public bath where Kakeru lives and works. She is a woman of firm convictions about the proper way to behave in a public bath.

== Media ==
=== Manga ===
Written by Gō Zappa and illustrated by Sakura Takeuchi, Chocotto Sister was serialized in Hakusensha's seinen manga magazine Young Animal from 2003 to 2007. Hakusensha collected its chapters in eight tankōbon volumes, released from 19 December 2003 to 27 April 2007.

==== Volumes ====
No.	Release date	ISBN
1	19 December 2003	978-4-592-13893-8
2	29 June 2004	978-4-592-13894-5
3	20 December 2004	978-4-592-13895-2
4	29 June 2005	978-4-592-13896-9
5	28 February 2006	978-4-592-13897-6
6	29 June 2006	978-4-592-14346-8
7	29 November 2006	978-4-592-14347-5
8	27 April 2007	978-4-592-14348-2

=== Anime ===
Chocotto Sister was produced by Nomad, directed by Yasuhiro Kuroda, and written by original creator Gō Zappa, with music by Masara Nishida and character designs by Yukihiro Kitano. The opening theme is "Doki! Doki! My Sister Soul" and the ending theme is "Neko-nyan Dance", both composed by Harenchi Punch. It was broadcast for 24 episodes on Kids Station from 12 July to 20 December 2006. It was later released on eight DVDs.

==== Episodes ====
No.	Title	Original release date
1	"The Present is a Little Sis?"; Transliteration: "Purezento wa Imouto?" (Japanese: プレゼントは妹?)	July 12, 2006
College student Haruma is stunned when a girl stated to be his sister is delivered to his apartment. Unwilling to evict her, he names the girl Choco, because she is constantly referring to her guide book. Haruma takes Choco to the mall to buy her clothing, but they lose sight of each other inside.
2	"The First New Year"; Transliteration: "Hajimete no Oshougatsu" (Japanese: はじめてのお正月)	July 19, 2006
The siblings go to a shrine for New Year's Day. Yasuoka, Makoto, and the original landlady make their first appearance. Choco starts her picture diary with the landlady's encouragement.
3	"The Manager has Arrived"; Transliteration: "Kanrinin-san ga Yattekita" (Japanese: 管理人さんがやってきた)	July 26, 2006
Chitose, the landlady's granddaughter and new manager, makes her way towards Tsubaki manor, but has many a mishap along the way. Eventually, with Haruma and Choco's help, she makes it.
4	"Valentine's Day of Luck"; Transliteration: "Rakku Barentain Dei" (Japanese: ラック·バレンタインデー)	August 2, 2006
Chitose plans to give Haruma, who has been roped into a special Valentine's Day job by Tamami. Choco is given misleading information about the meaning of Valentine's Day from Makoto.
5	"Buy a Bra"; Transliteration: "Burajā wo Kai ni" (Japanese: ブラジャーを買いに)	August 9, 2006
After seeing Chitose's laundry and wheedling a demonstration out of the manager, Choco asks her big brother to buy her an item of intimate lady's apparel. A drunken Makoto embarrasses Chitose, but still manages to get herself along with Choco invited for lunch the next day.
6	"Lecture on Public Baths That are Easy to Understand"; Transliteration: "Yoku Wakaru Sento Koza" (Japanese: よくわかる銭湯講座)	August 16, 2006
Tamami saddles Haruma with yet another job, for which he is paid for in goods, in this case, T-shirts and some tickets for the premiere of a movie. Haruma invites Ayano, who is a huge fan of the movie's main actor, to accompany him. Meanwhile, Choco has her first encounter with Kakeru. She meets him for a second time, when the Kawagoes go to a public bath because of a water outage. Midori instructs Choco in public bath etiquette.
7	"Cheerful, Heartbroken, Depressed"; Transliteration: "Ukiuki, Gakkuri, Shonbori" (Japanese: ウキウキ、ガックリ、しょんぼり)	August 23, 2006
Haruma angers Choco by going on a date with Ayano and leaving her at home. When Chitose sees the two of them on their date, she becomes depressed. However, it seems Ayano has romantic troubles of her own which do not concern Haruma, but rather a young man soon bound for the countryside... Afterwards, Haruma manages to redeem himself in the eyes of Choco and Chitose, somewhat.
8	"Draft"; Transliteration: "Sukima Kaze" (Japanese: すきまカゼ)	August 30, 2006
Haruma is late getting home after Ayano invites him out for drinks to stave off her own romantic woes, due in part to him having to escort an inebriated Ayano to her home. Choco falls ill after having stayed up late, waiting for Haruma, alarming her big brother.
9	"Buds of Love"; Transliteration: "Koi no Tsubomi" (Japanese: 恋のつぼみ)	September 6, 2006
Haruma has been avoiding Ayano because of what happened on their night out, but shows up at Ayano's shop at the same time that Kazuya comes to get his ring from Ayano. After Kazuya leaves, Ayano tells him about her and Kazuya. The next day Ayano sends him flowers as a gift and he goes shopping for a watering can with Choco.
10	"Let's Hot Spring!"; Transliteration: "Let's Onsen!" (Japanese: Let's 温泉!)	September 13, 2006
While shopping with Chitose at the local shopping arcade, Choco wins a free trip to the Hot Springs for four. Choco chooses to go with Haruma, Chitose and Makoto. Much to her dismay, Makoto gets a call from her job while the four of them are waiting at the train station and she ends up not going. Haruma thinks he sees Ayano as they get off of the train but convinces himself that he's seeing things. Choco, Chitose and Haruma register at the hot springs as a family, with Chitose (part eagerly, part disturbed) signing in as a Kawagoe. To his dismay, Haruma finds out that the bath is coed and he tries to hide from Choco and Chitose but gets dizzy after staying in the water too long and staggers out of the bath in full sight of the girls.
11	"Love is Gone"; Transliteration: "Koi, Sarinu" (Japanese: 恋、去りぬ)	September 20, 2006
That night Haruma can't sleep for thinking about Ayano so Choco offers to hold his hand. The following day Choco, Haruma and Chitose go on a hike to see the sights around the hot springs. To his surprise Haruma meets Ayano and convinces her not to give up on her love.
12	"A Downpour, and then..." Transliteration: "Doshaburi, soshite―..." (Japanese: どしゃ降り、そして――)	September 27, 2006
During a rainstorm Haruma gets a call from Ayano saying that she will be moving to the countryside with her finance. Noticing Haruma's depression Choco asks Chitose and Makoto for help and she decides to write a letter to Ayano explaining Haruma's feelings for her. When he finds out, Haruma gets angry and Choco run away from home. Concerned about her absence, Haruma reads Choco's diary.
13	"First with Yuri-pyon"; Transliteration: "Hajimete no Yuri-pyon" (Japanese: はじめてのゆりぴょん)	October 4, 2006
Yurika is bored with her routine and escapes from her chauffeur with Choco's help. After the run away from him Yurika explains, untruthfully, that she is being chased because she witnessed a murder and saw the murder's face. Eventually the chauffeur hunts them down and Yurika goes with him. Later Yurika goes searching for Choco, but, although she knows where Choco lives, she doesn't know her name. Yuriko happens to stumble across Tsubaki manor and Choco, where she is invited inside for a drink - the beginning of a new friendship.
14	"Neko-nyan and Brassieres"; Transliteration: "Neko-nyan to Burajā" (Japanese: ねこにゃんとブラジャー)	October 11, 2006
Haruma and Choco see the Nekonyan Dance on TV as they are eating breakfast. Choco later goes out and she walks by a daycare where the children are dancing the Nekonyan Dance. The teacher invites her to dance with them, so she does. Choco stays for lunch and plays with the kids until they all go home except for a little boy, named Takeshi. Choco stays and plays with him until his mother arrives to find that Choco and Takeshi have fallen asleep. Later, Yurika calls to say that she is nearby.
15	"At the Pool, Japun!"; Transliteration: "Pūru de Japun!" (Japanese: プールDEじゃぷん!)	October 18, 2006
Tamami forces Haruma into a new job: lifeguard at a pool. He's given free entry tickets, and gives them to Choco and Chitose. Elsewhere, Yurika skips her English lesson to visit Choco, but, to her annoyance, finds nobody home. Killing time at a nearby park she is attacked by a dog but Kakeru saves her.
16	"Dokiwaku Summer Festival"; Transliteration: "Dokiwaku Natsumatsuri" (Japanese: ドキワク夏祭り)	October 25, 2006
Choko is excited about attending her first summer festival. She becomes separated from Haruma and Chitose, but soon she meets Kakeru, and later Yurika, who has decided to come to a 'commoner' event accompanied by her maid. Yurika becomes jealous seeing Choko and Kakeru together. In the end everyone re-unites and they watch fireworks together.
17	"Noisy Tea Party"; Transliteration: "Dotabata Tī Pātī" (Japanese: ドタバタ☆ティーパーティー)	November 1, 2006
Yurika finds herself smitten with Kakeru, and plans a tea party as an opportunity to socialize with him. However, she is too shy to invite him directly, so she invites Choco and asks her to bring her friends. To Yurika's dismay, Choco arrives at the party accompanied not by Kakeru, but by a number of the children she befriended in episode 14.
18	"Let's Meow Sing!"; Transliteration: "Let's Nyan Shingu!" (Japanese: Let's にゃんシング!)	November 8, 2006
Choko wants to join the Nekonyan Dance contest, but it turns out that she cannot do so with fewer than five people. After convincing Haruma, Makoto, Chitose, and finally Yurika to participate, they videotape their dance and send it in.
19	"The Idol's Melancholy"; Transliteration: "Aidoru no Yūutsu" (Japanese: アイドルの憂鬱)	November 15, 2006
Eriko Odawara, the idol famous for performing the Nekonyan Dance live on television every morning, is tiring of the role and bails out of a scheduled performance at the daycaare in Choco's neighborhood. A chance encounter with Makoto (who is strongly implied to be the famous gravure idol Arisa Otokami - their names are acronyms) convinces Eriko of the true importance of her job. Odaeri then visits Choco's apartment where she gives a private performance of the Nekonyan Dance.
20	"My Kitten"; Transliteration: "Atashi no Nyanko" (Japanese: あたしのにゃんこ)	November 22, 2006
After Haruma refuses to buy her a pet, Choco befriends an escaped puma, whom she names Kuro (the Japanese word for 'black'). Choco visits Kuro daily at his home in an abandoned warehouse, and introduces him to Kakeru and Yurika. Tragically, Kuro dies in a road accident.
21	"Let's Amusement Park!"; Transliteration: "Let's Yūenchi!" (Japanese: Let's 遊園地!)	November 29, 2006
Choko is still sad after Kuro's death and in order to liven her up, Haruma, along with Chitose and Makoto, take her to the amusement park. Choko meets a girl who says she has lost her mom, and spends the day seeking for her. What she does not know is that the girl and her mother are Mr. Yasuoka's daughter and wife, long since dead.
22	"First Master"; Transliteration: "Hajimete no Goshujin-sama" (Japanese: はじめての御主人様)	December 6, 2006
Choco is persuaded by Tamami to take part in her club's maid café at Haruma's collage festival. While at work, Haruma gets a call from his cousin who is in town, and wants to visit him. When Choco approaches Haruma and his cousin he denies that Choco is his little sister. Choco is distraught and begins too question who she is, putting her existence in jeopardy. [Note: aside from this incident, no mention of how Haruma is going to explain the sudden existence of a little sister to his family, let alone his parents].
23	"Wish"; Transliteration: "Negai" (Japanese: 願い)	December 13, 2006
Much to his considerable consternation, Choco has disappeared and Haruma should remember Choco.
24	"Happy Christmas"; Transliteration: "Happī Kurisumasu" (Japanese: ハッピー·クリスマス)	December 20, 2006
Choco delivers her Christmas gifts - who will be the surprise guest at the Christmas party.

=== Drama CDs ===
Four drama CDs have been produced.

== See also ==
- My Dear Marie, another manga series by Sakura Takeuchi
