= My Dear Marie =

Japanese manga series

- First tankōbon volume cover

ぼくのマリー (Boku no Marī)
- Genre: Romantic comedy; Science fiction
- Manga
- Written by: Sakura Takeuchi
- Published by: Shueisha
- Magazine: Weekly Young Jump
- Original run: 1994 – 1997
- Volumes: 10
- Original video animation
- Directed by: Tomomi Mochizuki
- Written by: Gō Sakamoto
- Music by: Hisaaki Hogari
- Studio: Pierrot
- Licensed by: AUS: Madman Entertainment; NA: ADV Films
- Released: March 6, 1996 – August 21, 1996
- Runtime: 30 minutes per episode
- Episodes: 3
- icon

My Dear Marie (Japanese: ぼくのマリー, Hepburn: Boku no Marī), also known as Metal Angel Marie, is a Japanese manga series written and illustrated by Sakura Takeuchi. It was serialized in Shueisha's seinen manga magazine Weekly Young Jump from 1994 to 1997. A three-episode original video animation (OVA) was animated by Pierrot and released in 1996. The OVA was licensed for English release in North America by ADV Films.

== Story ==
Hiroshi Karigari, a college student, is shy and awkward, but a genius in robotics. He has a crush on another student named Marie. Utterly failing to communicate his feelings to her, he creates an android almost exactly like her, close enough to pass for her twin, and names her Marie. But though he programmed her to be the perfect wife, she turns out to be quite different. Then Marie accidentally meets the original Marie, and Hiroshi starts telling people that he and Marie are siblings as a cover story. Soon, a tough girl, Hibiki, enters the picture, and threatens to reveal the truth about Marie, unless Hiroshi becomes her boyfriend.

== Media ==
=== Manga ===
Written and illustrated by Sakura Takeuchi, My Dear Marie was serialized in Shueisha's seinen manga magazine Weekly Young Jump from 1994 to 1997. Its chapters were collected in ten tankōbon volumes released from July 24, 1994, to July 23, 1997.

=== Original video animation ===
A three-episode original video animation (OVA) animated by Pierrot was released from March 6 to August 21, 1996. The OVA was licensed for English release in North America by ADV Films and released on VHS, in Japanese with English subtitles, in 1998. ADV Films later produced an English dub, releasing it on VHS, under the title Metal Angel Marie, in 1999. The OVA was later released on DVD, with the original title My Dear Marie, on September 28, 2004. The OVA was licensed in Australia and New Zealand by Madman Entertainment.

==== Episodes ====
No.	Title	Original release date
1	"The Birth of Marie"; Transliteration: "Marī Tanjō" (Japanese: マリー誕生)	March 6, 1996
2	"The Appearance of Hibiki Kennou"; Transliteration: "Kenō Hibiki Tōjō" (Japanese: 剣王ひびき登場)	May 22, 1996
3	"Dreaming Android"; Transliteration: "Yumemiru Andoroido" (Japanese: 夢みるアンドロイド)	August 21, 1996

== Reception ==
Keith Rhee of EX described the comedy of the series as its "main selling point of the show", comparing it to Masami Yuki's Assemble Insert, and concluded that viewers who enjoy lighthearted shows with many wacky antics would find My Dear Marie worth watching. Carlos Ross of THEM Anime Reviews also praised the OVA, noting its "stunning animation, unique character designs", and story, which he called "alternately hilarious and really touching". Ross ultimately called My Dear Marie an unexpectedly adorable romance story.

Chris Beveridge of AnimeOnDVD called the characters and story "sweet", and praised the animation, character designs, and overall artwork. He added that it was easy to like the characters and rare to like the male lead, but that My Dear Marie succeeded in doing so. In a negative review, Bamboo Dong of Anime News Network wrote that the OVA was visually hideous, story-wise awful, and emotionally insulting, and criticized the randomness of its plot. Dong concluded that while it might evoke nostalgia for old school anime fans who watched such content on VHS, contemporary viewers need not settle for it, finding no romance, comedy, drama, science fiction, or heart-tugging emotions present.

== See also ==
- Chocotto Sister, another manga series illustrated by Sakura Takeuchi
