= List of Koihime Musō episodes =

This is a list of episodes of Koihime Musō, a Japanese anime television series based on the visual novel of the same name. The Koihime Musou anime began airing in Japan on July 8 and ended on September 23, 2008, on Tokyo MX and the Chiba TV. It was directed by Nobuaki Nakanishi. It was followed by an OVA released on April 1, 2009. The series was simulcast on Crunchyroll.

== Koihime Musō (2008) ==
No.	Title	Original release date
1	"Kan'u Makes a Vow of Sisterhood With Chōhi"; Transliteration: "Kan'u, Chōhi to Shimai no Chigiri o Musubu no Koto" (Japanese: 関羽, 張飛と姉妹の契りを結ぶのこと)	July 8, 2008
Kan'u, a traveling warrior who fights bandits, visits a town where she encounters Rinrin and her troublemaker friends. While most of the town folks find their antics funny, the mayor doesn't. Then he decides to send his soldiers to catch Rinrin until Kan'u volunteers to do it herself. After meeting and fighting her which ends in Rinrin's defeat, Kan'u realizes that her antics are just her way of getting attention after being lonely after following her grandfather's death. After making a vow of sisterhood with Chōhi (Rinrin other name), Rinrin apologizes to the mayor and leaves her hometown with Kan'u but not before saying goodbye to her friends.
2	"Kan'u is Going to Die With Chōun"; Transliteration: "Kan'u, Chōun to Shichi ni Omomuku no Koto" (Japanese: 関羽, 趙雲と死地に赴くのこと)	July 15, 2008
Kōsonsan, a local feudal lord and Chōun (also known as Sei), another warrior, ask Aisha (Kan'u real name) to help find a hidden base belonging to Bandits so they can be eliminated. Aisha agrees and she and Sei hide in a merchant's crate so the bandits will steal it and take it to their base. After finding their base, Chōun and Aisha fight off some of the bandits and rescue the prisoners held by them before finding themselves in a dead-end. However, Rinrin arrives and helps the prisoners escape while Chōun and Aisha defeat the rest of the bandits. Kōsonsan is not happy hearing this since she wanted to show off her White horse in battle. Chōun decides to join Aisha and Rinrin in their travels since Kōsonsan, though a noble person, is not strong enough to unite the country and its rival factions.
3	"Chōhi and Bachō Fight Each Other"; Transliteration: "Chōhi, Bachō to Aiutsu no Koto" (Japanese: 張飛、馬超と相打つのこと)	July 22, 2008
Enshou, the arrogant noble of Shao meets Sōsō, the young queen of Wei, who has asked permission to have her troops enter Enshou's land to destroy an army of bandits there on behalf of the Imperial capital. Sōsō leaves but not before humiliating and insulting Enshou and her assistants, Bun Shou and Ganryou, for their idiocy and not dealing with the bandits in Shao. She later meets Aisha who she develops an interest in. Meanwhile, Aisha and her friends are working at a Maid Restaurant in order to earn money but Chōhi decides to earn money another way where she meets Bachō, and both of them decide to enter a fighting tournament hosted by Enshou. Both of them make it to the final round which ends in a "draw", which impresses Enshou, who decides to ask them to join her group. Bun Shou and Ganryou, are not pleased since both of them fear they will get fired so Enshou decides to hold a three-round contest between the two groups. Both groups win a round (Chōhi and Bachō in Beauty and Bun Shou and Ganryou in Intelligence) before the third round begins where they are asked to fight in a Sumo match while wearing a humiliating Sumo attire. In the end, Bun Shou and Ganryou win the contest by default when Chōhi and Bachō decided to forfeit and not embarrass themselves, while Chōhi decides to introduce Aisha and Sei to Bachō.
4	"Bachō Tries to Attack Sōsō"; Transliteration: "Bachō, Sōsō o Utan to Suru no Koto" (Japanese: 馬超、曹操を討たんとするのこと)	July 29, 2008
Sōsō and her troops return to Shao after defeating the army of bandits. While there, she meets Rinrin when she is suddenly attacked by Bachō who claims Sōsō killed her father, Batō, before being subdued by Rinrin and Sōsō's guards. Aisha, after hearing the news, meets Sōsō and asks her to spare and release Bachō. She agrees, on the condition that Aisha sleeps with her that night. However, their night together is interrupted when an Assassin tries to kill Sōsō but Aisha manages to save Sōsō. Thankful, Sōsō frees Bachō for Aisha. Kakou Ton, Sōsō's commander, while escorting Aisha, reveals the truth of what happened to Bachō's father. On the night he died, Batō was ordered to have a match with Sōsō, but she refused since he was too drunk to fight. Embarrassed, he left the palace where he fell off his horse and was seriously injured. Ton and her men found him and she promised to keep the secret of how he died. However somebody did see them and mistakenly believed that Sōsō sent her troops to kill Batō. Sōsō decided not to do anything about the rumor, since she wanted to protect Batō's honor to make it seem like he died a warrior's death (A warrior who died drunk falling from his horse is considered an embarrassment.). Bachō refuses to believe it and accuses Ton of lying, who is insulted and challenges Bachō to defend her honor. Before they began their match, Bachō realizes that Ton was telling the truth when she notices her fighting stance and remembering her father's words that "A noble warrior with no secrets or regrets, will show it in their fighting stance". Realizing her mistake, she breaks down and cries. In the end, Bachō decides to return to her home to tell her people the truth, while Rinrin is confident they will meet again.
5	"Kan'u Exterminates A Monster"; Transliteration: "Kan'u, Bakemono o Taiji Sen to Suru no Koto" (Japanese: 関羽、化け物を退治せんとするのこと)	August 5, 2008
The group saves a timid, young lady from bandits, who, unknown to them is, Toutaku, the Governess of Zhao. She tells the group she came to investigate a rumor that a monster has been threatening a village to bring food to a temple every week. After Toutaku and the village leader plead with them, they agree to go to the temple to stop the monster. Aisha and Rinrin are too scared to face the monster after hearing a ghost story from Sei and faint when they finally meet it. Sei realizes that the 'monster' is actually a woman and tries to fight her only to be knocked out swiftly by her opponent's powerful strike. They regroup along with Toutaku accompanying them to finally meet the 'monster' herself, whose name is Ryofu. After a fierce fight between the four, they all stop when Toutaku tries to save a puppy from a falling tree where Aisha and Rinrin are forced to stop the tree. Ryofu, later reveals that she was only threatening the village for food since it was for her many pet dogs. At this time, Toutaku's strategist, Ka Ku finally finds Toutaku, revealing her secret. At her palace, Toutaku forgives Ryofu, in exchange Ryofu will remove the giant rock she placed at the village gate to scare the villagers. Ryofu's dogs also will be living in the palace where they will be trained to become guard dogs to help defend the kingdom against thieves after Toutaku pleads with Ka Ku, who reluctantly agrees.
6	"Chōhi Competes With Kōmei"; Transliteration: "Chōhi, Kōmei to Hariau no Koto" (Japanese: 張飛、孔明と張り合うのこと)	August 12, 2008
Sei is angry at Aisha and Rinrin after they ate her food at a restaurant. While traveling through a foggy mountain, they lose track of Sei and Aisha sprain her leg after falling into a ditch. After coming to mansion, they are helped by Shibaki and her student Kōmei. Rinrin is jealous of Kōmei since Aisha praises her for her kindness, intellect and her many skills. Later Shibaki tells Kōmei to find a herb in the mountains which can heal Aisha sprain leg, which Rinrin decides to secretly follow, hoping to get it before her. During the journey, Kōmei is revealed to be afraid of heights but she still continues which confuses Rinrin. When she finally finds the herb at the side of a cliff, she tries to get it but falls where she is saved by Rinrin. Rinrin, out of pride, decides to help Kōmei get the herb and accompany her home which Kōmei is thankful. After being healed, Aisha thanks Shibaki and asked if there is anything she could do for her. Shibaki replies that she brings Kōmei in their journeys to be her guardians so she will learn to become a great scholar. Aisha agrees and Kōmei says goodbye to her teacher.
7	"Chōhi has a Fight with Kan'u"; Transliteration: "Chōhi, Kan'u to Nakatagai Suru no Koto" (Japanese: 張飛、関羽と仲違いするのこと)	August 19, 2008
Rinrin has a fight with Aisha about Kōmei and leaves the group. While in town, she is reunited with her friend Bachō where both of them enter an eating contest. They lose to a young girl name Kyocho. The three later saves a young boy from a group of cheating loan-sharks who threatened to take his older sister. The trio decide to protect he and his sister at their house, while there with the siblings, Rinrin is reminded of her relationship between her and Aisha. The next day, the loan-sharks return and a brought a warrior named Chouryou to fight the trio. Chouryou enjoys the fight but it is short lived when the loan-sharks have taken the siblings hostages. Then, a masked woman saves the siblings who calls herself Butterfly Mask (Who is really Sei but Rinrin doesn't realize it is her except Bachō.). In revenge of their cowardly act, Chouryou destroys the siblings loan agreement and scares the loan-sharks to never return. In the end, Rinrin is reunited with Aisha where they both reconcile.
8	"Kan'u Obstructs Kōchū's Plan"; Transliteration: "Kan'u, Kōchū no Takurami o Habaman to Suru no Koto" (Japanese: 関羽、黄忠の企みを阻まんと するのこと)	August 26, 2008
Aisha, Rinrin and Kōmei rescue a girl from a shopkeeper only to realize the girl swindle him. The girl, Shōren, who is a member of the royal family of the Kingdom of Wu, decides to join Aisha's group. Later her jewellery is stolen by a crow which is stunned by an arrow from an archer from above an inn which impress the girls. At a restaurant, the group learns a neighboring feudal lord's son will be marrying the local lord's daughter despite opposition from some of the lord's family. Aisha suddenly realize that the archer's window is facing the path where the groom will be paraded. The archer, Kōchū reveals to the group that she being forced to assassinate the groom for her daughter's life, Riri who has been kidnapped. When Kōmei recognize a drawing from Riri as the shopkeeper they meet before, she along with Aisha, Rinrin and Shao mount a rescue to save her while Kōchū stays back to keep her minder distracted. Using Shōren and the shopkeeper as a distraction, Aisha and Rinrin defeat the kidnapper's at their hideout and rescue Riri. Thanks to a horse provided by Sei (in her Butterfly Mask alter ego), Aisha manages to bring Riri to her mother's attention which stops her attempt and punches her minder. Kōchū thanks Aisha who mistakenly thinks Aisha and Rinrin are mother and daughter, only to make matters worse when Ririn misinterpret their relationship, which Kōchū now thinks are lovers.
9	"Enshō Digs Up a Treasure"; Transliteration: "Enshō, Takara o Horiaten to Suru no Koto" (Japanese: 袁紹、宝を掘り当てんとするのこと)	September 2, 2008
Reiha's group finds a treasure map and decides to find the treasure. Aisha's group and Karin's group (excluding Shuuran) are also going to the same place, with both of them going the Hot Springs for relaxation there. When Aisha's and Sōsō's group find the Springs has dried up, they both decide to find another buried hot springs somewhere around the area. While Aisha group was trying find the springs, they encounter a large bear, who Rinrin thinks it her pet bear only to realize it isn't, runs away from it. Reiha's group learns about the other two and thinks their both after the treasure and decides to secretly follow them with disastrous results. The place Keifa choose (and left before digging it) is fill with creepy insects when Enshō's group they remove its stone cover. When Reiha thinks Shuri maps has the complete location of the treasure (when in fact it is a map where the springs might be located) she take Shōren hostage in exchange for the map. But Rinrin has no interest rescuing Shōren (where everyone disproves of her behavior) which ends when the same bear chases after Reiha's group until they fall off a cliff. After recovering from her fall, Reiha realize the treasure isn't worth it since she has two important treasures with her, Iishe and Toshi. She then accidentally moves a giant rock which reveals the hidden springs. In the end, all three groups decides to relax at the hot springs but not before Reiha's group and Karin's group insults each other until Butterfly Mask arrives to stop their bickering and the location the treasure is reveal to be located in the Bear's lair.
10	"Sonsaku's Life is Threatened"; Transliteration: "Sonsaku, Inochi o Nerawareru no Koto" (Japanese: 孫策、命を狙われるのこと)	September 9, 2008
The kingdom of Wu under Queen Sonsaku has been rapidly expanding its territories. While their wars has made them famous abroad, at home it has cause concern to Princess Sonken and some nobles who fear these wars may destroy the kingdom. At a banquet, Sonsaku secretly reveals to her strategist and lover Shuyu, that her actions were the last wishes of her late mother Sonken. She wishes to unite the country and later abdicate the throne in favor of her sister Sonken who she knows will heal the damage her wars has cause to the nation. At the same time, a group of nobles led by Choushou, launches a plan to end Sonsaku reign. Meanwhile, Aisha group has arrived at Wu where Shōren is scolded by her aunt Sonsei for running away. Sonsaku thanks them for taking care of her sister by having them stay overnight. The next day, Aisha, Rinrin, Shōren goes on a hunting trip accompany by Kannei. While alone, Aisha notices Sonsaku on her balcony from a top of a hill. When they return, Aisha is arrested by Sonken orders. When they were away, Sonsaku was shot by a poison arrow and is now in a coma. According to the witnesses, the arrow came from the same hill Aisha was at and they believe she was the culprit since she was there and there wasn't anyone who was with her to prove she wasn't the one who did it. Kōmei counter the claim and believes Kannei is a suspect since she too was alone during that time and she could have a motive since a vassal is more likely to kill her master rather than a stranger. Before the insulted Kannei can harm Kōmei, Shuyu manages to stop her and tells Sonken to let Aisha go since there is no proof she done it and Sonken is acting base on her feeling. Later that night, an assassin tries to kill the unconscious Sonsaku who suddenly tells the assassin to stop who is reveal to be Sonsei. Her attempt on her life at balcony was actually an act to catch the dissenting nobles with Aisha being at the wrong place at the wrong time. Choushou, the leader of the dissenter is reveal to be working with Shuyu and Sonsaku and was secretly getting the names and proof of the collaborators. Sonsei reveals that she and the dissenters felt the blood shed from her wars has cause so much damage that it will come back to haunt the family which Sonsaku responds she knows since her acts are for the betterment of the kingdom and has her aunt arrested. Kōmei, Aisha and Rinrin leaves on a ship on the Yangtze River before Shōren, Rikuson and Sonken who came to apologize to Aisha sees them off. Before everything ends, Kōmei points that all that incident seemed to be planned by somebody else. Shuryu then reveals herself to Rikuson as the author of that whole scenario, and ask her about her thoughts about Koumei. Rikuson thinks that Koumei will be quite a great strategist someday, and she looks forward to see her in the future, while Shuryu says that someday maybe she'll stands in their way.
11	"Kan'u Meets Ryūbi"; Transliteration: "Kan'u, Ryūbi to Deau no Koto" (Japanese: 関羽、劉備と出会うのこと)	September 16, 2008
Aisha walks out of the cave that she Rinrin and Shuri slept where she finds herself in battle between Bandits and Militias. Immediately both she and Rinrin fight the off the bandits which forces the bandits to retreat. After the battle, the commander of the Militia's introduced himself as Ryūbi (Real name Gentoku) and thanks the girls for their help. He realize that Aisha is the Black hair Beauty bandit Fighter which at first she thinks he will question her beauty and is surprised and embarrassed when he says the stories of her beauty are true. At the village of Touka, the feudal lord explain how Ryūbi who claims to be a descendant of Liu Sheng, with his followers came to his village to help them fight against the bandits which he agree by helping him form an army. Ryūbi's army was defeated 7 times which at one point the lord was thinking of kicking him out the village should he lose again. With Aisha and Rinrin fighting skills and Shuri's strategies, Ryūbi army are defeating the bandit armies. Aisha is enamored with Ryūbi ambitions to save people from misery and his resemblance to her late brother. While the girls were searching for medical herbs, Shuri finds a special plant and plucks it and is scared to find underneath the plant, an almost dead Bachō. While recovering, Bachō explain that she accidentally ate a poisonous mushroom which sent on her on hallucinatory trip until she fell on the spot the girls found her and would have died if she wasn't found. Following Shuri's advice, the lords mansion is fortified with watchtowers and a ditch surrounding it. Rinrin makes friends with the village children and learns from them the village name comes from the peach blossom trees growing here. At the same time, Sei, Kōchū and Riri travels to Touka after hearing about their friends exploits there.
12	"Kan'u Fulfills Her Ambition"; Transliteration: "Kan'u, Kokorozashi o Tsuranuku no Koto" (Japanese: 関羽、志を貫くのこと)	September 23, 2008
Ryūbi and his army attend an imperial war meeting between other loyalist army commanders hosted by the Commander-in-Chief of Imperial forces, General Kashin to discuss the recent uprisings the empire is facing. Rinrin stays back after getting a fever with Shuri staying to take care of her. During the meeting, General Kashin ask on how to defeat an army of rebels who have fortify a mountain. Sōsō suggests a Siege strategy where they will cut off the rebels supply routes to deprived them of supplies which will starve them and affect their morale and an offer of clemency to those who surrender. But Kashin is not interested of showing mercy to the rebels and wants them to be eliminated quickly as a lesson to others. Ryūbi takes the offer to fight them head-on with the promise of bringing the leaders head. Kashin, impress of his willingness, agrees to give him the mission and reward him as her aide in the government if he succeeds. Meanwhile, the bandits that Ryūbi's army defeated have united and launched a surprise attacked on Touka to get their revenge. When news of the attack reaches Ryūbi, Aisha suggest to immediately go back and save the village. But Ryūbi decides to abandon Touka and focus on the fighting the rebels and seducing Aisha to join him. Realizing that Ryūbi never care about the people and was more interested in power, she slaps him and goes to Touka to save her friends with Bachō following her. Bachō asks Sōsō for help but she refuse citing Aisha foolishness to follow Ryūbi but when Bachō begs on her knees, she tells Shunran to lead the Black Riders cavalry unit on "reconnaissance" at Touka. At Touka, the defenders and villagers are forced to fall back into the lord's mansion. When the bandits finally breach the mansion gates, they are stop by a sick but angry Rinrin who declares that no one shall pass through. Just as Rinrin reaches her limit, Aisha finally arrives and helps Rinrin defend the gate. Together with the help of Kōchū and Sei, the arrival of Bachō, Shunra and the Black Riders, the bandits are quickly defeated. After the battle, Aisha ask Shunra if she can thank Sōsō herself but Shunra tells her not to as she might end up in Sōsō's bed again. While asking where Sei has been all this time, she replies that she died and was revived by a mysterious being only to tell everyone it was a lie. Ryūbi's army without the help of Aisha and Bachō, could not breach into the rebels mountain fortress and had to give up and return to Touka after three days which Sōsō army took over and succeeded using her siege strategy. Ryūbi was strongly reprimanded by Kashin for his failure and embarrassing the imperial court. He tries to save face by returning to Touka only to unexpectedly meet Kōchū and Riri who recognized him as the man who kidnap her and made Kōchū do the assassination, he quickly runs away. Kōchū concludes that he was a criminal and impostor, who got tired of doing dull crimes and decides to gain riches and fame by claiming to be a descendant of Liu Sheng. The series ends with an epilogue detailing what everyone was doing now; Aisha and the group along with the villagers celebrate under the peach blossom trees while Rinrin playing with Riri and the village children, Shunra doing official work while Sōsō is relaxing with Keifa and Shūran in bed under the peach blossom trees, Sonken and Kannei inspecting the Wu Navy at the Yangtze River while her sister Shōren gets chase by the Qiaos Sisters, Sonsaku, Shuyu and Rikuson viewing the moon from a balcony, Enshō, Bunshū and Ganryō finding the Hot Springs treasure again with the help of the bear that chase them before, Ryofu sparring with Kayū while Tōtaku and Kaku watch them along with Ryofu's dogs, Kyocho winning another eating contest, Chōryō working at a maid restaurant, Kōsonsan dreaming leading with her white horse and Shibaki receiving a letter from Shuri. The last scene ends with Aisha and Rinrin reaffirming their sisterhood vows with the narrator telling how the 6 heroines and their new adventures will be told some other time, some other place.
OVA	"Koihime Musō OVA"; Transliteration: "OVA「Koihime†Musō」" (Japanese: OVA「恋姫†無双」)	April 1, 2009
In this alternative universe episode set in the present in St. Francesca Academy, Rinrin has a fight with Aisha which both girls decide to compete in the Sports Festival with other the teams led by Sōsō, Sonken, Kōsonsan, Tōtaku and Reiha. One by one, the teams are eliminated with Reiha's team winning. Despite this, Aisha and Rinrin reconcile and Reiha, to her horror, gets a "special" prize; a kiss from Principal Chousen.

== Shin Koihime Musō (2009) ==
No.	Title	Original release date
1	"Bachou, things seem discontented" Transliteration: "Bachō, Monmon to Suru no Koto" (Japanese: 馬超、悶々とするのこと)	October 5, 2009
With Koumei's strategism and the five strong warriors Kan'u, Chōhi, Chouun, Bachou and Kouchuu's power, Touka Village army grows more and more. Bachou, hearing Riri, Koumei and Kan'u calling Chōhi her given name Rinrin, wants to call her that, too. Though she is embarrassing to call her so, she finally does that. In the end, the friendship of five warriors with Koumei and Riri gets stronger and Kan'u plans to do another journey. Next episode introduces a girl with pink hair asks for the way to Touka village.
2	"Ryūbi visits Touka village" Transliteration: "Ryūbi, Tōkason o Otozureru no Koto" (Japanese: 劉備、桃花村を訪れるのこと)	October 12, 2009
Koumei went out to buy some porn books with Kan'u's group waiting in the restaurant, hearing things about Kousonsan, swords, and the Chou sisters idols. A girl with pink hair is cornered by the trio bandits, with perverse thought about her. Kan'u's group come in time and with one swing, Kan'u sends the trio away (to the sky). The girl introduces herself as Ryūbi Gentoku, that surprises Kan'u and her friends. Ryūbi finds that there's an impostor claiming Ryūbi before, and she's aware of the man. Koumei tells the party about Kousonsan's sword and asks Ryūbi come to find about it. Ryūbi leaves the day after only to get herself attacked again, and once again, Kan'u's party saves her (then with Chouun as Kochou Kamen). Later, Ryūbi and Kan'u's party (except Bachou and Kouchuu with Riri) leaves Touka for Kousonsan's place.
3	"Kousonsan Fights Enshou!"; Transliteration: "Kōsonsan, Enshō to Shiyū o Kessuru no Koto" (Japanese: 公孫賛、袁紹と雌雄を決するのこと)	October 19, 2009
Ryūbi and her party come Kousonsan's city. Kousonsan welcomes them and is surprised that Ryūbi comes with them. She tells them that the sword isn't here now. Because Enshou's lending food for her city, Kousonsan must give it to her as a proof that she will repay Enshou. The party goes to Enshou's place. They're involved to Enshou's stupid games as usual. Koumei loses 0-100 to Ganryou in Question Game (about Enshou's secrets). Ganryou loses Ryūbi 11-13 to Eel Catching (by breasts) Game. And the games later with Bunshuu and Chōhi in Arm Wrestling, Ganryou in Tongue Twister, Bunshuu and Kan'u in Imitations, Ryūbi in "What's in the box?", Bunshuu and Chouun in Staring Contest, Ganryou and Chōhi in Bean Carrying, Clam-matching, Cosplaying and the games come to a tie 150-150. The last match, Kousonsan and Enshou in Sumo Wrestling of Ladies wearing a swan loincloth (though Kousonsan wears her white-horse loincloth), ends with Kousonsan's win (her power goes up while she remembers how unnoticeable she was). Ryūbi cannot get her sword back because Enshou just lent it to her cousin Enjutsu before (through Choukun's saying that is a pun of The Emperor's New Clothes). Kousonsan doesn't have to pay for the food Enshou lent her city and Ryūbi's party leaves for Enjutsu's city.
4	"The Three Chou Sisters acquire the "Crucial Keys to the Way of Peace""; Transliteration: "Chō Sanshimai, Taihei Yōjutsu o Te ni Ireru no Koto" (Japanese: 張三姉妹、太平要術を手に入れるのこと)	October 26, 2009
The Chou sisters try to get their money by performing magic and music, though it's hard to deal. A man claiming himself Ukitsu gets them a little dream and gives them the Taihei Youjutsu (Crucial Keys to the Way of Peace) book full with magic references. Chouhou uses the magic to create three magic crystals (somehow it resembles a microphone) and the three sisters plan to put their first magnificent performance using this, and they get successfully. Their successes come one by one, and they have been famous more and more ever. In the way to Enjutsu's city, Ryūbi is caught off by a poster of the Chou sisters, she suggests the party to take a look at them. The party goes to see a performance of the sisters, and stops a small fight in the performance. The sisters start to think about the way to get rid of the annoying matters that may cause problems to them someday. Ryūbi's party leaves to continue the journey.
5	"Kakuka and Teiiku come into Sousou's service" Transliteration: "Kakuka to Teiiku, Sōsō ni Ysukaen to Suru no Koto" (Japanese: 郭嘉と程昱、曹操に仕えんとするのこと)	November 2, 2009
In the journey, Chōhi's stomach hurts. Ryūbi's party comes to a man's resting place for Chōhi to rest. The man claims himself as a doctor and he saves Chōhi from her stomachache. The man introduces himself as Kada of "The Way of Fire Grains" (五斗米道, Gotomedou). He tells the pary about the Taihei Youjutsu using people's hatred of oppression instead of its caster's magical energy. Though it was originally created for good reasons (using energy to help people), the book gained its own will and created more hatred for its power. Kada suspects Sousou has it and goes with the party to reaches her place. They find a spectacles woman fallen with a pool of blood around her, only to find out that's only nosebleed through her friend. They introduce themselves as Kakuka and Teiiku, on the way to come into Sousou's service. Kan'u accepts to introduce them to Sousou. In Sousou's city, Kada goes straight to Sousou's palace and Ryūbi's party with Kakuka, Teiiku go for a meal. Knowing Taihei Youjutsu's truth, Sousou agrees to Kada and stops her search for it. Kada asks her for reason to search it, she tells him about it and eventually, his way to treat her problem makes her mad and kicks him out of her palace. Then, Kan'u asks her for audience and she makes her and Kakuka, Teiiku to her bath. An assassin appears, Kakuka and Kan'u help Sousou to capture her. Finally, Sousou accepts Teiiku as her strategist, Kakuka as her bodyguard (because of her nosebleed "talent").
6	"Ten'i is tested by Sousou"; Transliteration: "Ten'i, Sōsō ni Tamesareru no Koto" (Japanese: 典韋、曹操に試されるのこと)	November 9, 2009
Kan'u returns to the inn that her party stays in and tells them about Kakuka's and Teiiku's employment. Kan'u is worried about Kada's safety after he angers Sousou (he merely manages to escape Kakouton). In the Chou sisters' performance, they have got another quarrel, this time Chouhou manages to use magic to calm down the audience. This magic effects to all people that are enchanted to the sisters. Ryūbi's party enjoy their meal at a restaurant with common yet specially delicious dishes and the chef, introducing herself Ten-i, offers them to taste her chicken manjūs. That evening, Kakouen invites Ryūbi's party to Sousou's gourmet. The day of the gourmet, Ryūbi's party and Sousou's subordinates are waiting for her cooking. Juniku is filled with her head about Sousou as usual. The guests eat Sousou's delicious cooking and enjoy it very much (except Chōhi because she cannot fill her stomach with it). Chōhi compliments about how good Ten-i's food is and Sousou orders Kakouton to bring her there. Ten-i cooks manjūs with combination of three dishes Ryūbi's party ate in her restaurants twice. Sousou admits her defeat, because she thinks she has not fulfilled her role as the hostess there for not thinking about Kan'u's preference. Ryūbi offers Sousou had tried her best for Kan'u's glory, and it's unnecessary to decide who wins and who loses in cooking. Sousou smiles and accepts that. An ox prepared for cooking escapes and attacks Ten-i, only to find out her massive power to throw it far away. Ten-i is suggested to join Sousou's bodyguards and she says she will decide it later. The Chou sisters get tons of jūmankin manjūs caused of Chouhou's mistake, only to find out how incredible the power Taihei Youjutsu is.
7	"Chinkyuu is taken in by Ryofu"; Transliteration: "Chinkyū, Ryofu ni Hirowareru no Koto" (Japanese: 陳宮、呂布に拾われるのこと)	November 16, 2009
Enjutsu is singing at her palace. After singing, she is indecisive about the food and drink she would have, only to make Choukun lectures her. Ryūbi's party arrives Enjutsu's city and takes a look at a gift shop. Chōhi wants a little toy dog charm, and a girl shows up saying she sees it first. They quarrel, Chōhi wins and the girl yells at her, running away the shop. Going out from the shop, they meet Ryofu. She talks to Kan'u, Chōhi and Chouun, and the girl earlier suddenly does Chōhi a "knee drop". Ryūbi's party talk to Ryofu and the girl, whom Ryofu calls Chinkyuu, and know about a married arrangement about Chouchou (Chinkyuu's dog). But Ryofu's party is giving up due to Enjutsu's poor managing the city. Ryūbi's party learns about Chinkyuu's hard past, and how she meets Ryofu and how she makes Chinkyuu's life better. Chōhi also learns that the little toy dog Ryofu hangs in the head of her "Houtenkakugeki" (her weapon) has lost, and the one she has bought from the shop resembling it (so Chinkyuu really wants it), then she gives it to Chinkyuu.
8	"Enjutsu orders a Monster's Extermination"; Transliteration: "Enjutsu, Bakemono o Taiji Sasen to Suru no Koto" (Japanese: 袁術、化け物を退治させんとするのこと)	November 23, 2009
Enjutsu declines to return the sword to Ryūbi. Ryūbi begs that she will do anything just to get it back, and Choukun suggests Enjutsu to exterminate the monster in her territory. Ryūbi's party go to the shrine that there is a rumor about the monster to exterminate it, but Kan'u and Chōhi faint for the first time. Koumei describes the monster to Enjutsu, which freaks her out, and she suggests Enjutsu to give Ryūbi's sword back, beside they will give her "the mystery mug" (just an ordinary mug Koumei buys from the gift shop) in exchange for the sword. Koumei tells the party about the plan, and they come to defeat "the monster", again. That time, they caught the children who make the monster, and find out they are orphans gathered there for many reasons. Koumei tells them she has a plan to protect the shrine. She tells Enjutsu about the sword turning to dust while fighting the monster, and suggests her to build an orphanage or else the monster will come back. Ryūbi's party pretend to be ghosts to scare the wits out of Enjutsu but somehow she is freaked out by some "true" ghost (she seems to be the boy's deceased mother Ryūbi gives flowers to). So, Enjutsu does what Koumei says.
9	"Gakushin, Riten and Ukin protect a village" Transliteration: "Gakushin, Riten, Ukin, Mura o Mamoran to Suru no Koto" (Japanese: 楽進、李典、于禁、村を守らんとするのこと)	November 30, 2009
Ryūbi is really happy about giving her sword back. In the way to return Touka, the party stops to rest in a village. They're mistaken to bandits, then their leaders Riten and Ukin attack them. Shortly after that, the mistake is clear and their other leader, Gakushin, brings a formal excusement to them. They find out Gakushin's group plans to join Sousou's army due to her good impression, but the bandits around there attack them many times and they don't have plans to defeat all the bandits, though. Ryūbi's party decide to help them. Koumei plans to use the Ryuujin-ko (the near lake) to help defeat the bandits (a flood attack using the rain, the bridge, the lake and the riverbed). They build a floodgate due to Riten's construction talent. Following the tactic, a small group attacks the bandits' camp to lure out them. When they arrive the riverbed, Riten will follow Koumei and Ryūbi's signal to open the floodgate to use the water attack. But the large rock falls and halts the water. Ryūbi uses her sword to a lightning rod and the lightning breaks the large rock. Finally, the flood attack is successful. Ryūbi asks Kan'u to be her younger sister, but Chōhi says she only accepts Ryūbi as her older sister, and the bond is built.
10	"Koumei wishes for a younger sister" Transliteration: "Kōmei, Imōto o Hossuru no Koto" (Japanese: 孔明、妹を欲するのこと)	December 7, 2009
The Chou sisters continue to use Taihei Youjutsu to gain what goods they want with Ukitsu secretly watches over them. Ryūbi feeds Kan'u food, that makes her embarrassing, and Chōhi gets jealous because Kan'u doesn't do that to her. Seeing that makes Koumei remembers about the past, about her elder and younger sisters. The party pasts by Koumei's home city and Chouun gets lost again. Arriving Suikyou's house, a girl with witch outfit opens the gate and runs to the home because they wield weapons. Suikyou introduces the timid girl, Houtou, to the party. Ryūbi says Koumei and Suikyou make a good family that makes Houtou a bit jealous. Suikyou arranges the bedrooms for the party, but Houtou doesn't want to take the same room with Koumei. The day after, Houtou wants Suikyou to go picking up herbs as she has promised but she cannot go, and Koumei suggests she will go in Suikyou's place. Houtou silently goes with her, but she doesn't seem a bit interest. She gets angry at Koumei and runs away, telling her she doesn't want them to be friends. Houtou falls into a hole in the old bridge, merely catches the bridge's rope. Koumei, despite her scare, manages to go to Houtou's place and helps her up. Their relationship gets better and Houtou says goodbye to Koumei with promise she will visit her someday. The Chou sisters' performance is thwarted by government's soldiers. When the official further tries to harass them sexually, Chouhou gets angry and commands her audience to get the soldiers.
11	"Bachou tries to hold it in" Transliteration: "Bachō, Nyōi o Koraen to Suru no Koto" (Japanese: 馬超、尿意をこらえんとするのこと)	December 14, 2009
The Chou sisters' inn gets destroyed due to the attack of Chouhou's audience. The audience does too much and that makes the Chou sisters fugitives. They decide to get more and more supporters so the army cannot touch them anymore. Bachou's cousin, Batai arrives to Touka village and plays a trick on Bachou. Bachou gets angry and wants her to go back to Seiryou, but Kouchuu calms her down and she forgives Batai. They have strict exercises in the morning. Batai gets exhausted many times but Bachou doesn't have her stop. In retaliation, Batai makes a bet with Bachou that she cannot help wetting herself and makes her drink a lot of water and hold it until the dinner. Bachou uses many methods to hold it in, and she ends up with releasing "it" in the river. Ryūbi's party comes back, and the fishes Kouchuu uses for dinner is from "that" river, much to Bachou's horror and sudden loss of appetite. After the dinner, Koumei holds a meeting about Sousou inviting them to join her army to wipe out the Yellow Turbans led by the Chou sisters. Later, Kan'u, Ryūbi, Chōhi and Koumei depart for battles, leaving Touka village to Kouchuu, Bachou and Batai. In the main camp, Sousou and Kan'u talk about the flag of Ryūbi's army. They meet Enjutsu and Choukun again. Sousou gets troubled because the number of Yellow Turban's army gets bigger and bigger, and Ten-i reports to her that Kada wants to meet her again.
12	"The General's Attempt to suppress the Yellow Turban Rebellion"; Transliteration: "Gunyū, Kōkin no Ran o Shizumen to Suru no Koto" (Japanese: 群雄、黄巾の乱を鎮めんとするのこと)	December 21, 2009
Kada guests the Yellow Turban Rebellion is caused by the Taihei Youjutsu. Juniku suggests an all-out battle against them but Ryūbi doesn't agree with that. Kada tells his ideas. They agree with him to use another songs of another singers to affect the Yellow Turbans' hearts, make them leave the rebels. And they use Enjutsu and Choukun's talent in music, and Teiiku suggests adding Kakuka. When Kada returns, he gets three magic crystals from Gotobedou's head with limited magic. They execute the plan. Ryūbi, Kan'u and Chōhi, Gakushin, Riten and Ukin, with Kada and the three singers Enjutsu, Choukun and Kakuka drive a big car to the rebels' tents. The song contest goes on. The magic of Kada runs out and the rebels follow Chouhou's order to get them. Ryūbi and Kan'u, Chōhi start singing with the help of three singers Enjutsu, Choukun and Kakuka, and the rest. Then, sings from the hearts win sings from the magic. The Chou sisters realize that their dreams from childhood weren't like that, and they disband the Yellow Turbans. Even before the present Kada seals Taihei Youjutsu, Ukitsu appears, takes it and disappears. In the meeting to decide the Chou sisters' and Yellow Turbans' punishment, Ryūbi supports to get their punishment as light as possible, so as Riten. Kakuka suggests for all them join Sousou's army. Koumei, Teiiku, Gakushin's group support her and Sousou decides to do as Kakuka suggests.
OVA	"Shin Koihime Musō LIVE Revolution" (Japanese: 真恋姫†無双 LIVE Revolution)	March 17, 2010
OVA	"Shin Koihime Musō OVA ~ Maidens in Full Bloom: Romance of the Three Kingdoms"; Transliteration: "Shin Koihime Musō ~ Otome Ryōran☆Sangokushi Engi~" (Japanese: 真恋姫†無双 ～乙女繚乱☆三国志演義～)	July 7, 2010

== Shin Koihime Musō: Otome Tairan (2010) ==
No.	Title	Original release date
1	"Ryūbi, Going on a Journey Once Again"; Transliteration: "Ryūbi, Arata ni Tabidatsu no Koto" (Japanese: 劉備、新たに旅立つのこと)	April 1, 2010
As Kashin was heading to the Emperor, she was caught off guard by Chōjō and her army, labeling Kashin as a traitor and forcing her to swallow a pill. Kashin questions her but suddenly she feels an effect towards her body while Chōjō laughed while she suffers. Meanwhile, in Touka Village, Kōmei was writing a letter to Hinari that everyone fine (except Sei who is still missing from the previous season). She even mentions that Ryūbi was given a Dragon God's sword by the villagers they've saved in the past as a present for sacrificing her own sword. Soon, Ryūbi realize that she has been gaining weight and decides to cut down some food but failed to do so. Ryūbi decides to skip meals but fail as she was too hungry to go to sleep and sneaks in the kitchen to eat some food. The next day, Chōhi informs everyone that she's pregnant (Thanks to the misunderstanding Kōmei sees something she shouldn't see between Ryūbi and Bachō). Outside, Sei just return from her journey, worrying that her friends forgotten about her until Kada and an hooded-woman approaches her. Luckily, Chōhi was looking for a doctor in which she manage to met them. It turns out that Ryūbi had some food poisoning from eating spoiled bamboo shoots and Kada manages to cure her (and the misunderstanding). Later, the group (and Sei who just appeared) learn that the hooded lady that Kada brought turns out to be Kashin...with a pair of cat ears. Despite the laughter from the group and Kashin tells them she hate cats, Kashin seeks for their help for an antidote since she was forcefully indulge a medicine called Nyanko-tan, a medicine which she'll turn into a cat. Kada explains that he needs the ingredients to make an antidote. The first is the persistent herb that only grows at the top of Mt.Taishan, the second is the Kouton pill by the Son family and the third is the belly button lint from a Nanban elephant found only in Nanban. Kada cannot find it as he need to search for the Crucial Keys book and seal it as soon as possible and seek for their help as they know Kashin. The group agrees to help her and set off on the journey. Sei and Bachō goes after the herb, Kan'u gets the Kouton pill alone while Kōmei, Chōhi and Ryūbi takes care of finding the lint.
2	"Hōtō Hides Something"; Transliteration: "Hōtō, Kakushigoto o Suru no Koto" (Japanese: 鳳統、隠し事をするのこと)	April 8, 2010
In the Tō providence, Kaku grieved over the loss of Kayū during the Kyoudo expedition as Kayū was missing in action after the battle while Chōjō had a bit of chat with her and tells her not to worry. Meanwhile, Sei and Bachō discuss about her cousin, Batai who couldn't join along with the group since she's still in training, as Bachō worries about leaving her alone. Sei snickers and tells her not to worry about it. At Ryūbi group, Kōmei notice that Chōhi carries a large box inside in which Chōhi says that she notice the box before heading off and notice the sign says 'Bentou'. With the little ploy by Kōmei, inside out came out Batai. Turns out that she wants to join along but Kōmei refuse to let her until Batai threaten Chōhi that she'll reveal her secret to Kōmei if she doesn't tag along. Reluctantly, thanks to Chōhi and Ryūbi, Batai joins the group. Along the way, they stop by at Suikyou's house, greeted by Suikyou and Hōtō. Kōmei explains the situation and Suikyou agrees to help her however she realize the box containing the lint was empty. Somehow Hōtō knows about it but keeps it quiet. During dinner, since Suikyou cannot find it, Ryūbi suggest that they should go to Rakuyou market. However Kōmei tells them that the probability is low plus Suikyou informs them that due to Kashin being removed by Chōjō, Chōjō invites Tōtaku to the imperial palace for the imperial's support due to her failure of the Kyoudo expedition. After that incident the capital turns into chaos and advise the group not to go near there. Back to their topic, Suikyou tells them that the Mōkaku Emperor has a Nanban elephant but wasn't quite sure about it. That night, Chōhi woke up from a nightmare and was heading to the bathroom until she heard a thief sneaking around, only to capture Hōtō who was taking some provisions. Suikyou and the rest woke up and ask her for an explanation. Hōtō explains that she's going to go to Nanban as she's the one who lost the lint that Suikyou kept while she was cleaning the place. She worries that they'll never forgive her for what she did and cries. Kōmei tells her that she's angry but at least she's being honest about it and forgives her. The next day, before the group depart to Nanban, Suikyou gives Kōmei a feathered fan for her journey. As they left the place, Chōhi decides to come out clean to Kōmei that she's the one who broke her inkstone and say it was an accident. However, Kōmei goes on berserk mode as it happens to be Suikyou's old inkstone and chase after her in a fit of rage. Meanwhile at Sei's group, Sei was upset that Bachō took the ramen with the extra bamboo shoot while Kan'u was all alone at the campfire.
3	"Ryomō Tries Academics"; Transliteration: "Ryomō, Gakumon o Kokorozasu no Koto" (Japanese: 呂蒙、学問を志すのこと)	April 15, 2010
At the Go Kingdom, Ryomō lost to Kannei during a sparring match and walk back home, sulking. Ryomō was later given a mission to be Sonken's bodyguard from sunset to sunrise. During those days as a bodyguard, she seems to take of Sonken during her studies at night. Sonken seems to realize that Ryomō takes interest in her studies and suggest to her to study with her. Once Ryomō read some of her books, Sonken realize that Ryomō's near-sighted and the next day, Sonken buys her a monocle for her right eye. Later times go by, Sonken gives her a test and surprisingly she pass the test even Sonken's expectations towards her. Soon, Sonken tells Ryomō that a female flute musician is going to come to the palace to play to Sonsaku. Ryomō wasn't too sure about bring strangers to Sonsaku as she heard that assassins hide their weapons inside harmless objects. Sonsaku tells her that Shūyu has inspected them and they come out clean, making Ryomō sigh in relieve. At night, Ryomō was scolded by Kannei since she was sleeping on duty (due to studying habit) when Sonken goes to the bathroom while she spots an intruder entering the store room and confines her in her quarters until further notice. Inside her quarters, one of the children came to visit Ryomō in her quarters as he found a flute lying on the weeds due to the commotion. Ryomō realize what's going on and rush towards Sonsaku's throne room and manage to save her in the nick of time, abide Kannei's orders. It turns out that the female musician and her group are assassins planning to kill Sonsaku and make a diversion to use a thief to switch the flute with a poisonous blade that looks exactly like the flute. Sonsaku was amaze of Ryomō's quick thinking that even her strategist didn't see this coming. Meanwhile, Ryomō was sacked from due to abiding her orders despite saving Sonsaku and tells her to stay at the quarters until further notice. Sulking, she walks to her quarters until the twins came to tell her to go to Shūyu now as she calls her. Thanks to Ryomō's actions, she was appointed as apprentice strategist for Sonken. She also informs her that Kannei even begs her to give that position since Ryomō preoccupied on her studies than guarding. Ryomō kindly accept it.
4	"Gien, Falls In Love At First Sight"; Transliteration: "Gien, Hitomebore Suru no Koto" (Japanese: 魏延、一目ぼれするのこと)	April 22, 2010
At Ryūbi group, they discuss about Tontaku's situation until a female swordsman bumps into Bantai and drops her dango. Not too happy about it, Bantai goes after her and engaging a battle with the swordsman along with Chōhi (after a few rounds). Suddenly another busty looking female appear with the group as they stop the battle. She apologize to the group while buying them dango in the restaurants (and even force the swordsman to apologize to them). She introduce herself as Gengan, the Taishu's lord while the swordsman is Gien, her student. She's been training Gien when she was young but as she grow older, she's been causing trouble by picking fights every day. As an apology, Gengan decides to give them a tour around Taishu. During that time Gien seems to take interest with Ryūbi as she looks like her late older sister when Gien was young. Fed up of Gien's habit, she place a paper string at her sword and once she draws her sword the paper breaks, making her and Gien end their relationship as master and student. However, a group of bandits overheard it and beat Gien badly until Ryūbi came to stop them only to be taken hostage. No other choice, she draws her sword and beats them, going as far as breaking her own sword. Back at Gengan's place, even though their relationship ends, she questions her on why she didn't run away like she used to do it. She noted that Gien did the right thing and even though she is not her master anymore, she'll continue to take care of her as she always do. The next day, the group bid them farewell while Gien decides to join them while Gengan gives her weapon to her.
5	"Sonshōkō Attempts To Fulfill Her Duty"; Transliteration: "Sonshōkō, Tsutome o Hatasan to Suru no Koto" (Japanese: 孫尚香、務めを果たさんとするのこと)	April 29, 2010
Kan'u reaches to one of Enjutsu's cities and coincidentally met up with Sonshōkō. although Sonshōkō wasn't happy that Chōhi didn't come along. Before Sonshōkō explains her mission, Kan'u was attacked by Shūtai who mistaken her as a bandit. Shūtai apologize for the misunderstanding while Rikuson explains that both Son family and the Enjutsu are having a feud between the mountain to expand their territory. Yesterday, she found a treaty between the two families with the proof that the mountain is theirs. Since most of the details have been completed, they're here to give them the treaty as proof. However, they were supposed to deliver it two weeks ago because of Rikuson's habit in reading books. That night, Enshō and her advisers came to visit Enjutsu as they were here to cast in Enjutsu play. At first she refuses as she was to play as Sōsō but since Chōkun tells her that Sōsō was defeated by the three Yellow Turban sisters and ran crying, she agrees. After they left, seems that Enjutsu and Chōkun have different ideas by humiliating Enshō. The next day, Kan'u and Sonshōkō group visit Enjutsu's play to give them the treaty. However Enjustu is too busy in the rehearsal and looking for a few more cast. Enjustu enlist Shūtai to play the black-hair bandit hunter (which was supposed to be Kan'u) while Kan'u, Rikuson and Sonshōkō plays the Chou sisters in exchange of looking at their treaty. Later, Kan'u notice that the script is a bit off but Chōkun tells her that it's not based on the real character but based on their own script. The performance was a success until Sonshōkō realize that her dressing room has been ransacked and notice that the treaty has been stolen. Chōkun overheard it when she was supposed to give them a gift tells Enjustu about it. In Enjutsu palace, she was confident that the scroll was stolen until Rikuson shows them the scroll in which to their surprise that it's the real deal. It was reveal that Shūtai stole the treaty and secretly gives it to Rikuson until the end of the show. Rikuson tells her that since there's high chances that Enjustsu will not see it, her reputation would be ruin as she might called a promise-breaker thus breaking off the treaty. But by pretending it's stolen, Enjutsu would feel in relieve and her reputation will not be ruin. Rikuson added that it's best not to tell Sonshōkō due to her personality about the plan. In the end Kan'u is on the boat with Sonshōkō's group heading back towards the Go Kingdom.
6	"Gien's Life Is In Danger"; Transliteration: "Gien, Inochi o Nerawareru no Koto" (Japanese: 魏延、命を狙われるのこと)	May 6, 2010
Ryūbi group was having a dango snack meal until one of the girls by the name Gotsutotsukotsu notice the group in shock. Soon Ryūbi group encounters many obstacles which nearly leads to killing Gien and Ryūbi. As they were staying for the night, Gien has a fight with Bantai as she excuse her for causing a lot of trouble ever since Gien came along however was stopped by Chōhi. The owner, whom they were taking shelter in his house, tells them that there's a hot spring near the area and also a hut for travelers to stay. After taking a bath in the hot spring, they notice that Gien was not around as she was supposed to take care of the fire at the hut in which the owner was there to do it by Gien's favor. Gien waited patiently until Gotsutotsukotsu and her friends surround her for Gotsutotsukotsu's revenge of her death of her sister. At first Gotsutotsukotsu's friends mock her that no friends would dare to help her until Bantai came along in a nick of time as she figures out what's been going on and both Gien and Bantai takes down her friends with ease. Due to their strength her friends left leaving only Gotsutotsukotsu. Gien recalls that during the tournament, she and Gotsutotsukotsu's sister battle each other out until Gien accidentally slice a bit of her chest too deep. After that, she pass away due to her wounds and high fever. Gotsutotsukotsu calls Gien a cheat but Bantai tells her that even though she has a very bad attitude, Gien will never do such a thing since she herself have been sparring with Gien a few times. Gotsutotsukotsu still argues that the fact her sister dies because of Gien so Gien advises her to train to be strong as Gotsutotsukotsu cannot beat her just yet. Gotsutotsukotsu accept it and runs back to the forest. In the end, Gien thanks Bantai for saving her and their friendship bonds together slightly.
7	"Kōgai Makes A Plan To Deceive Her Allies"; Transliteration: "Kōgai, Saku o Mochiite Mikata o Azamuku no Koto" (Japanese: 黄蓋、策を用いて味方を欺くのこと)	May 13, 2010
As the ship stops at the harbour, Kan'u and Sonshōkō's group gets out of the ship, greeted by Sonken and Ryomō. She congratulates Sonshōkō for completing the mission after receiving Shūtai's message. AS they enter the Go palace, they were also greeted by Kōgai. However, as they were about to visit Sonsaku, they accidentally overheard both Sonsaku and Shūyu arguing so Sonken went inside to stop the fight as they have guests. Later, Sonken apologize to Kan'u for the commotion and willing to help Kan'u. The problem is that they do not know where they place the pills as it wasn't that valuable to them and have to search in some of the storehouses. On the other hand, Sonshōkō wasn't too happy about them arguing especially when she was hoping to be praise by them. Kōgai understands the situation and decides to talk to both of them. It turns out that they're bickering over Shūyu's rare and expensive alcohol as she just recently bought it and somehow Sonsaku secretly drinks it. Not too happy about them arguing over it, both Sonshōkō and Kōgai came up with a plan. Shūyu, who've been drinking too much, was trying to straighten herself up until she got a word that Kōgai is in her sickbed and going to die. As she rushes to it, Kōgai tells her about her condition and tells her to get 'it' before she dies. So Shūyu quickly rushes to one of the storehouses only to find Sonsaku who's also looking for the same thing. Suddenly, Sonshōkō locks them both inside the storeroom while Kōgai talks to them at the narrow window that she knew that she'll get the alcohol drink that Kōgai brew when Sonsaku gave birth. Kōgai also tells them that she's doing this for both of their own good and lets them cool off until they resolve and leaves. Spending the night in the storehouse, they manage to resolve their differences and Kōgai smiles as she knew they'll make amends to each other and leaves them till next morning. The next day, Sonken finally found that specific storehouse that has the Kouten pill, only realizing later that it's the same storehouse that both Sonsakue and Shūyu locked up and catches them sleeping, naked. Later, after retrieving the pills from them, Kan'u bid them farewell on boat thanking them for their help. On the boat, Kan'u hopes that the rest of the group manage to obtain the items they're looking for.
8	"Mōkaku Is Captured And Released Many Times"; Transliteration: "Mōkaku, Takusan Toraware, Takusan Hanatareru no Koto" (Japanese: 孟獲、たくさん捕らわれ、たくさん放たれるのこと)	May 20, 2010
Somewhere in the Nanban Kingdom, King Mōkaku is taking an afternoon nap until she accidentally bits her pet elephant, PayaPaya's tail. Mōkaku wakes up and sees her elephant for an apology and she accidentally tell it to leave, which her pet takes it seriously and leaves her. Her subordinates came with food and were curious on her pet. Mōkaku tells them that her pet accuse her for biting its tail however, her subordinates tells her that she did bite them once when she was asleep. Realizing her mistake, she and her subordinates goes after PayaPaya to apologize to it. Meanwhile as Ryūbi group were taking a bath in the river due to the hot sun, PayaPaya came leaping towards Chōhi hands. It seems that it was chased by the tiger but Chōhi manages to scare it away. Later Chōhi takes a liking of her new pet, until Mōkaku came taking back her pet and apologizing to it, while Chōhi goes emotional since she lost her new pet. They soon realize Mōkaku name and ask for help however, Mōkaku refuses to help them as it's one of their national treasure and will not simply handed it to strangers like them. After an argument, Mōkaku challenge them if they want the lint, they must capture her and make her give up. After six attempts of being captured by the group, fed up of it, Mōkaku decides to cast a spell on her pet elephant; it turns big and goes wild on them. The gang decides to help her defeat the giant elephant by cutting off one of the tails thanks to Chōhi deductions. In the end Mōkaku thanks them and gave in, only that they decides to join along with them since she needs to make sure they don't use the lint for evil and adore on big boobs. Meanwhile, Sei's group manages to reach the summit only to get stuck by the blizzards while Sei experience hallucination from the cold while Bachō tries to snap her out of it.
9	"The Allied Forces Attempt To Defeat Tōtaku"; Transliteration: "Gun'yū, Tōtaku o Utan to Suru no Koto" (Japanese: 群雄、董卓を討たんとするのこと)	May 27, 2010
In the Imperial Palace, Kaku reports to Chōjō that she should continue the construction, despite the protest from the workers. Chōjō was also upset that Enshō did not dispatch any soldiers to her, demanded that she be strip off her rank and summon her to the palace. Meanwhile Chinkyū notice Chouryou had been drinking; the latter was troubled about taxing and taking prisoners as workers. Kaku understands the feeling but finds it difficult to accept it and follow Chōjō's orders. Meanwhile, the entire Shoku group reunites at Touka Village with friends that some bring along. They are telling each other their experiences when a cute little girl with cat ears and tail comes in. It is realized that it is Kashin who has change from when they last saw her. Mōkaku helps her. Kōmei prepared a medicine that Kada instructed her on its application in the first episode. Kashin drinks it and returned to her adult form except the remaining cat ears. Meanwhile, Ukitsu tells Chōjō that the plan is to by shift the blame to the Tōtaku Army and enable the functioning of the Crucial Keys. Enshō learns about Chōjō's orders to tell the other lords to dispose of the Tōtaku as traitors. Chōjō lets the Tōtaku engage in battle at the Kouran gate.
10	"Shūtai Sneaks Into The Palace"; Transliteration: "Shūtai, Kyūchū ni Shinobikomu no Koto" (Japanese: 周泰、宮中に忍び込むのこと)	June 3, 2010
Not knowing the truth, Enshō seeks an alliance with the other lords to overcome Tōtaku. Among the lords are Sōsō, Sonsaku, Enjutsu, Ryūbi (who was appointed as the leader of the Shoku Army) and Kōsonsan. The alliance is at the first gate of Shisui Fortress, the latter guarded by Ryofu Hōsen and her army. In the darkness, Chinkyū sneaks out to seek help at the Alliance camp by telling them Chōjō's plans and Tōtaku was used as a puppet while being held captive. The Alliance is not assured by Chinkyū's words despite the tears. Chōhi yells at them that the truth is being told because Chōhi's tears are sincere and if they believe otherwise they are not worthy of being a lord nor a strategist. Sonsoku giggles as she agrees with Chōhi and the Alliance finally believe Chinkyū. So the Alliance plans to rescue Tōtaku although they do not know her location. Kōmei realizes that she knows that Kashin knows and when she appears before them there is a group laugh when they see her cat ears. She tells them about a secret passage that the emperor uses when he is in danger; she escaped the palace using the passage. Sonsaku will use Shūtai for the rescue mission after Kashin explains where is the passage entrance. Shūtai enters the imperial palace through the secret passage, that a message to that effect was sent to the Alliance but the secret passage collapses. Knowing Shūtai's situation, Kōmei comes up with a plan to reveal Tōtaku's location with the aid of Riten and her mechanical dolls. With everything set, once they give Shūtai's the message, they start the plan. The following day Chinkyū met up with Ryofu and shows them the Tōtaku doll, proclaiming that the one at Rakuyou (imperial palace) is a piglet used by magic and can be only reveal by a mirror. Chinkyū tells everyone that it was all Chōjō's plan in order to shift the blame at her. The guards were confuse until Ryofu orders them to let them pass. Soon Chōjō's heard about it and carries a mirror to Tōtaku's cell only to find out that the Alliance tricked Ryofu, not realizing that Shūtai follow her towards Tōtaku's cell. While taking a loo, Kaku was secretly inform by Shūtai about the plan as Kaku was happy she's safe. Soon Shūtai manages to knock out the guards and rescue Tōtaku. Once placing Tōtaku into Kaku's carriage, the alarm went off as they quickly run in their carriage. They manage to fend off the guards chasing her but as the gate close, a mysterious figure helps them open the gate. She jumps into the carriage to reveal Kayū, who's alive. Chōjō was enrage about it until Ukitsu shows up as he has no use for her and use magic to force her to drink a potion that turns her into a rat in an instant.
11	"Chōryō Faces Off with Kan'u"; Transliteration: "Chōryō, Kan'u to Aiutsu no Koto" (Japanese: 張遼、関羽と相打つのこと)	June 10, 2010
The episode begins when Ukitsu manages to find the stone army in the emperor's tomb. Elsewhere, Kayū explains to Kaku that she was captured by the Kyoudo army but due to her abilities, they decides to keep her rather than making her as a prisoner. She manages to escape and throwing the Kyoudo army in pursuit by going through different cities. Later she heard rumors about Tōtaku's tyranny so she pretend to be a beggar. Kaku cried a bit in relieve that she's safe. Meanwhile, Sonsaku receive Shūtai's message that they manage to rescue Tōtaku and the gates are open for them. However, at the next gate Chouryou decides to battle the Alliance as she haven't fought anyone so she make a proposal that whoever could defeat her and take the white flag from her, she and her army will accept their surrender. Kan'u challenge and battles her. In the end after some words from Kan'u, she accept defeat and surrenders to the Alliance. Soon, Tōtaku came before the Alliance and makes a bold request that they should kill her in order to make the people happy due to the false rumors that Chōjō makes which ended in suffering. Kaku came in knowing about it and begs them not to punish Tōtaku but takes her punishment instead. Just then Kakuka tells Sōsō to let her decide her fate as Kakōen brings in a mannequin head, proclaiming it Tōtaku's head. She informs everyone that Kakōen have slain Tōtaku. Understanding the situation, everyone declare that Tōtaku's dead while the Tōtaku in front of them is just a village girl by the name Tonton. Sōsō then tells Kaku to take care of her in which Kaku agrees, knowing that the real Tōtaku doesn't need to suffer. Meanwhile, Gengan decides to visit the Alliance as she was planning to help them although she came a bit late. During the meeting Enshō congratulate them for disposing the traitor despite herself being late. Just before they discuss on cleaning up the mess, Kada came to inform everyone that Ukitsu's plan that thanks to Chōjo's help, he has gain enough energy to collect the population's rage into power for his Crucial Keys Book and use it to revive an army of clay statues from the first emperor's tomb. Suddenly, Kannei informs everyone that an unknown force has destroy the Kankoku Fortress. Soon they came up with a new plan to defeat Ukitsu and his army before he strike but since he's carrying the Crucial Keys and he's a powerful mage, normal blades and arrows will not hurt him. Kada do suggest if they only have the Dragon's claw as it turns into a sword and it was so powerful that it can defeat any evil enemy. Ryūbi sigh that she will not be able to see the sword; however her friends look at her knowing that she has possessed that particular sword.
12	"The Allied Forces Attempt To Defeat Ukitsu"; Transliteration: "Gun'yū, Ukitsu o Utan to Suru no Koto" (Japanese: 群雄、于吉を討たんとするのこと)	June 17, 2010
Ryūbi tested out the sword to everyone's amazement that it is the sword that they're looking for in order to defeat Ukitsu. It seems that this was actually her sword however it turns into a powerful sword in the process. At Tōtaku's area, they were ask for assistants despite being kicked out of the army while the Chō sisters were upset that they could not perform for Sōsō celebration army. Soon they devise a plan to make a diversion to ambush them once they see Ukitsu and the book in order for Ryūbi to defeat him. Meanwhile, Chōjō (as a rat) tells Ukitsu and warns him about the dragon claw sword. And so as the army plans everything out until Ukitsu manages to beat Ryūbi and dispose of her sword. All it's lose until the real Ryūbi comes out from the box that Chōhi. Ukitsu unmask her realizing that she's Chōkaku while Ryūbi manage to stab him, killing him. Ryūbi thanks Chōkaku for switching place to fool Ukitsu while Kada manages to seal the book in time. Finally everyone celebrates their victory at Rakuyou. Kashin have server food for everyone, Sonshōkō and Chōhi were about to take her boobs comparison challenge but was put to the halt as some of the girls with big boobs notice them, while there was a singing performance from the Daikyō, Shōkyō, the Nanban Dance Troupe (Mōkaku and her group) and Enjutsu group. During the performance, Tōtaku and Kaku seem to be the maids, Hōtō came to visit them with Riri, not knowing that Chōjō was spying on them (after her curse was lifted). Soon everyone decides to join in the dance and fun. In the end, Kan'u, Chōhi and Ryūbi visit Chōhi's hometown and spend the night together.
